= The King Maker =

- Thai movie poster.
- Directed by: Lek Kitaparaporn
- Written by: Sean Casey
- Produced by: David Winters
- Starring: Gary Stretch; John Rhys-Davies; Yoe Hassadeevichit; Cindy Burbridge
- Cinematography: Jiradeht Samnansanor
- Edited by: William Watts
- Music by: Ian Livingstone, (featured song 'Fall For You' written by Phillip John Gregory)
- Distributed by: Alpha Beta Films International; Sahamongkol Film International (Thailand)
- Release date: October 20, 2005
- Running time: 100 minutes
- Countries: Thailand; United Kingdom
- Languages: English; Thai
- Budget: 250 million baht

The King Maker (Thai: กบฎท้าวศรีสุดาจันทร์), or The Rebellion of Queen Sudachan, is a 2005 Thai historical drama film set during the Ayutthaya kingdom. With a storyline that shares many similarities to 2001's The Legend of Suriyothai, The King Maker's plot focuses on a Portuguese mercenary (Gary Stretch) in the service of the Siamese court. Directed by Lek Kitaparaporn and produced by David Winters, it was the first English-language Thai film production since the 1941 film, King of the White Elephant, produced by Pridi Phanomyong.

== Plot ==
The story opens with Portuguese soldier Fernando de Gama in a shipwreck. He finds some wreckage to float on and washes up on the coast of Siam. After almost being eaten by a crocodile, he is captured by Arab slave traders and taken to Ayutthaya. Released from his bonds to be put on the auction block, he promptly knocks down his captors and leads them on a chase throughout the ancient city.

Eventually, he is brought under control, but not before he is captured the attention of a Eurasian beauty, Maria, who buys him his freedom back. After recovering from his recapture, Maria brings Fernando to meet her father, Phillippe. Fernando immediately recognizes Phillippe as the man who killed Fernando's father many years ago, whom Fernando has been seeking on a lifetime quest for revenge.

But there are bigger battles to be fought. Fernando and his Portuguese compatriots are pressed into the service of King Chairacha, who has to go into battle. It is a multi-national taskforce, not only including Portuguese mercenaries, but also samurai warriors (likely Christians expelled from Japan). In battle, Fernando bonds with a Thai warrior named Tong. They distinguish themselves by saving the King from an assassination attempt and are appointed his personal bodyguards.

Queen Sudachan, a former royal consort who schemed her way into becoming queen, is behind the assassination plot. Because it failed, she calls on Don Phillippe for help. Phillippe in turn enlists a scar-faced ninja to kill the king. This plan is also thwarted by Fernando, Tong and other Siamese troops. After the assassins are killed in the king's bedroom, King Chairacha assigns Tong and Fernando the task of seeking out whoever is behind this scheme.

Recognizing one of the dead assassins as the scar-faced ninja he had seen Phillippe talking with earlier that night, Fernando confronts Phillippe. They fight, and Phillippe is killed by Tong. Meanwhile, the queen resorts to black magic to poison the king. She also must kill her own son, Prince Yodfa (who is next in line for the throne), to clear the way for her boyfriend Worawongsathirat. This she achieves by hiring a spear-wielding African warrior.

Succeeding in her plot, Fernando and Tong are then framed for the deaths and made to fight each other in a death duel for Queen Sudachan, her new king, and the crowd's amusement. Tong's family and Maria's life are threatened, and Tong throws an axe at Worawongsathirat, slaying him. Moments before the queen kills Tong and Fernando in revenge, King Chairacha's brother Maha Chakkraphat arrives. Having deduced on his own that the queen is behind the king and prince's deaths, he arrests the queen and releases our heroes and their loved ones. In an ending text, it is stated that news of these events were heard by the king of Burma, and that the story's impression of disarray is what caused the Burmese invasion and the eventual decline and destruction of Ayutthaya.

== Cast ==
- Gary Stretch as Fernando De Gama
- John Rhys-Davies as Phillippe
- Cindy Burbridge as Maria
- Yossavadee Hassadeevichit as Queen Si Sudachan
- Dom Hetrakul as Tong
- Nirut Sirijanya as King Chairacha
- Charlie Trairat as Prince Yodfa
- Akara Amarttayakul as Phan Bud Sri Thep
- Byron Bishop as Scar-Face Ninja

== Language issues ==
- All the dialogue was recorded in English. However, when the movie was screened commercially in Thailand, the parts where Thai characters were interacting with other Thais were dubbed in Thai.

== Awards ==
The film received two nominations at the Thailand National Film Association Awards, best supporting actress for Cindy Burbridge and best art direction.
