= Wat Phra Si Sanphet =

Ruins of Buddhist temple in Ayutthaya, Thailand

Coordinates: 14°21′21″N 100°33′30″E

- วัดพระศรีสรรเพชญ์
- Three Chedi's of Wat Phra Si Sanphet

- Location in Thailand

Religion
- Affiliation: Theravada Buddhism

Location
- Location: Ayutthaya Historical Park, Phra Nakhon Si Ayutthaya
- Country: Thailand

Architecture
- Founder: Borommatrailokkanat
- Completed: 1448
- UNESCO World Heritage Site
- Official name: Historic City of Ayutthaya
- Type: Cultural
- Criteria: iii
- Designated: 1991
- Parent listing: Historic City of Ayutthaya
- Reference no.: 576
- Region: Asia and the Pacific

Wat Phra Si Sanphet (Thai: วัดพระศรีสรรเพชญ์; "Temple of the Holy, Splendid Omniscient") was the holiest temple on the site of the old Royal Palace in Thailand's ancient capital of Ayutthaya until the city was completely destroyed by the Burmese in 1767, during the Burmese–Siamese War.

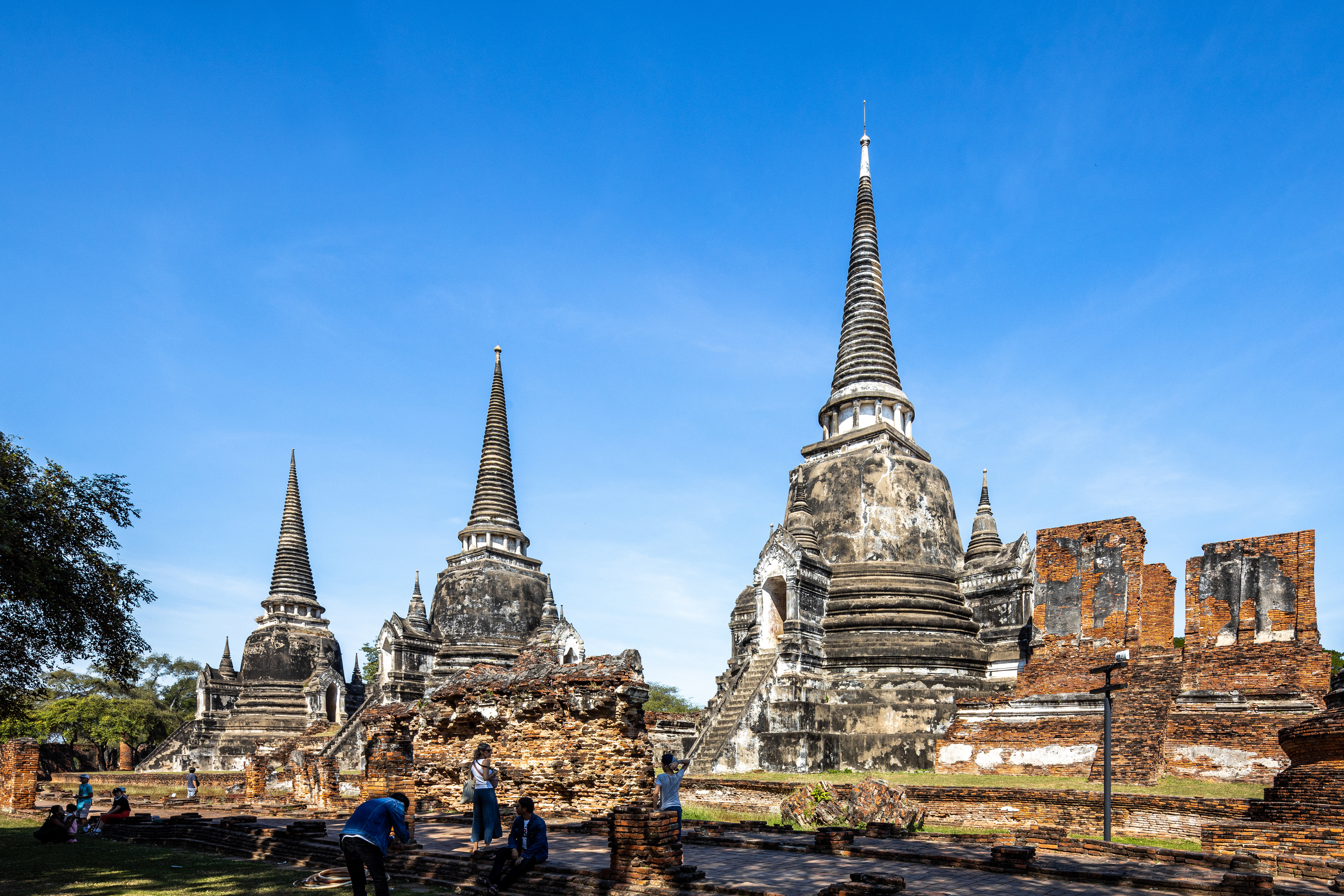
Wat Phra Si Sanphet in December 2023

== History ==
In 1350 U-thong, also known as King Ramathibodi I, ordered the construction of a royal palace in the same area that Wat Pra Si Sanphet stands today. The palace was completed in 1351 and King Ramathibodi established Ayutthaya as the capital of his Kingdom. The palace contained three wooden buildings named "Phaithun Maha Prasat", "Phaichayon Maha Prasat", and "Aisawan Maha Prasat". Upon finalization of the palace in 1351, he established Ayutthaya as his capital and was bestowed the title of King Ramathibodi I. In 1448 King Borommatrailokkanat built a new palace to the north and converted the old palace grounds to be a holy site. His son, King Ramathibodi II added two Stupa, which in Thailand are known as Chedis, built in 1492 where the ashes of his father, King Borommatrailokkanat, and his brother, King Borommaracha III were buried.

In 1499 a viharn, or hall of worship, called “Vihara Luang” (Royal Chapel) was built on the palace grounds. King Ramathibodi II gave orders for a gigantic image of Buddha to be cast, and installed in Wat Si Sanphet. This image of Buddha was 16 meters high, covered in gold, and the pedestal was 8 meters in length. The core of the statue was made of bronze and weighed approximately 64 tons. The surface was covered with approximately 343 kilograms of gold. The statue took more than three years to complete. This statue, called “Phra Si Sanphetdayan”, was the main object of veneration within the royal chapel.

Another Chedi was built under King Borommaracha IV in 1529 to enshrined his father's ashes, King Ramathibodi II. Later, more constructions were added by King Narai. It's not sure if the Mondops between each Chedis were added during that time. In 1630, King Narai added a cross-shaped vihara just west of the platform supporting the three chedis, this vihara is known now as Prasat Phra Narai. The architecture is inspired by a mix of European style for the shape while the pointed arches windows are influenced by Indo-persan architecture.

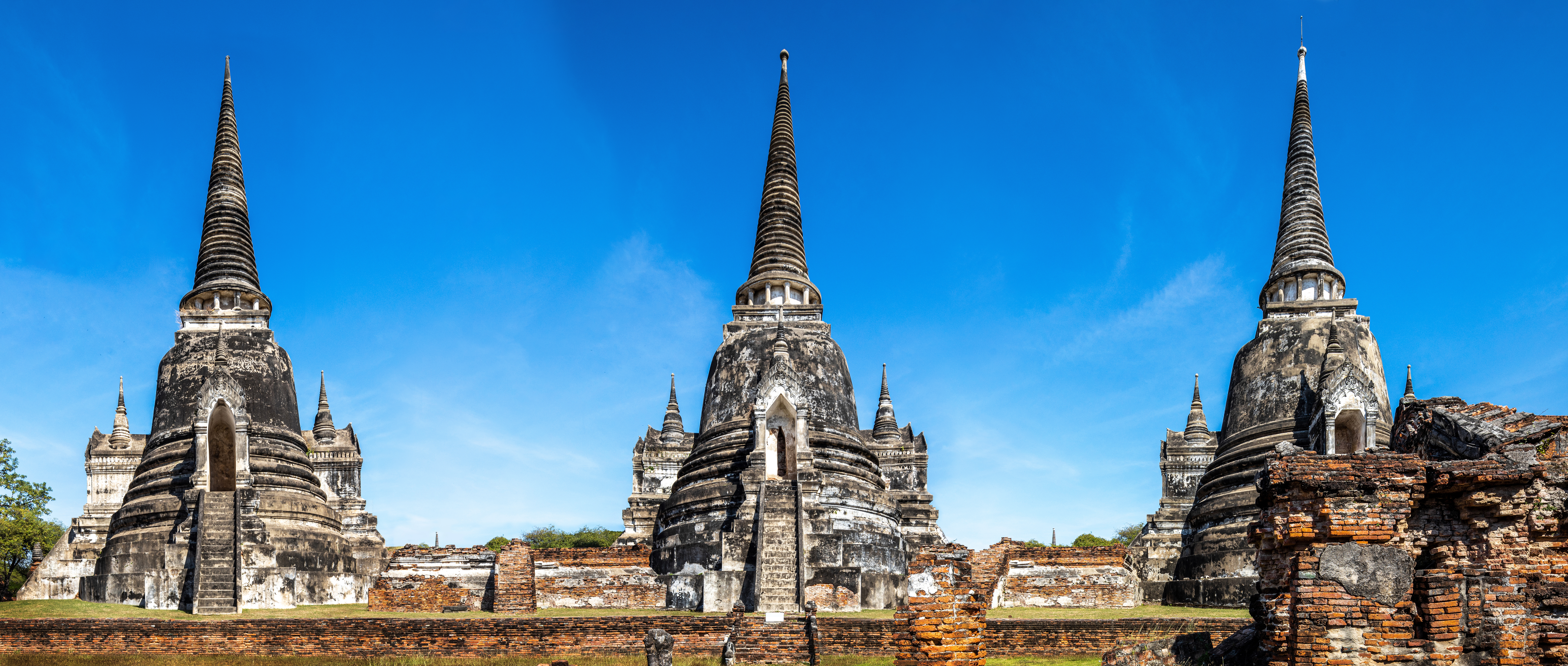
A multipoint panorama of three chedis of Wat Phra Si Sanphet, from left to right: (1) Chedi of King Ramathibodi II (2) Chedi of King Borommarachathirat III and (3) Chedi of King Borommatrailokkanat

In 1742, under King Borommakot, the temple was again renovated. Unfortunately, the city of Ayutthaya, including the temple compounds, were completely destroyed in the Burmese invasion in 1767, with the exception of the three Chedis that can be seen today.

In 1767, the Burmese conquered the capital of Ayutthaya and began the extensive destruction and looting of numerous temples and other buildings, including the Wat Phra Si Sanphet. They set the building on fire and melted the gold. Two Chedis were destroyed in the process, while the eastern Chedi was still standing. All were restored by the Fine Arts Department in 1956.

== Use ==
Wat Phra Si Sanphet was the royal temple, it was exclusively used by members of the royal family.

== Description ==
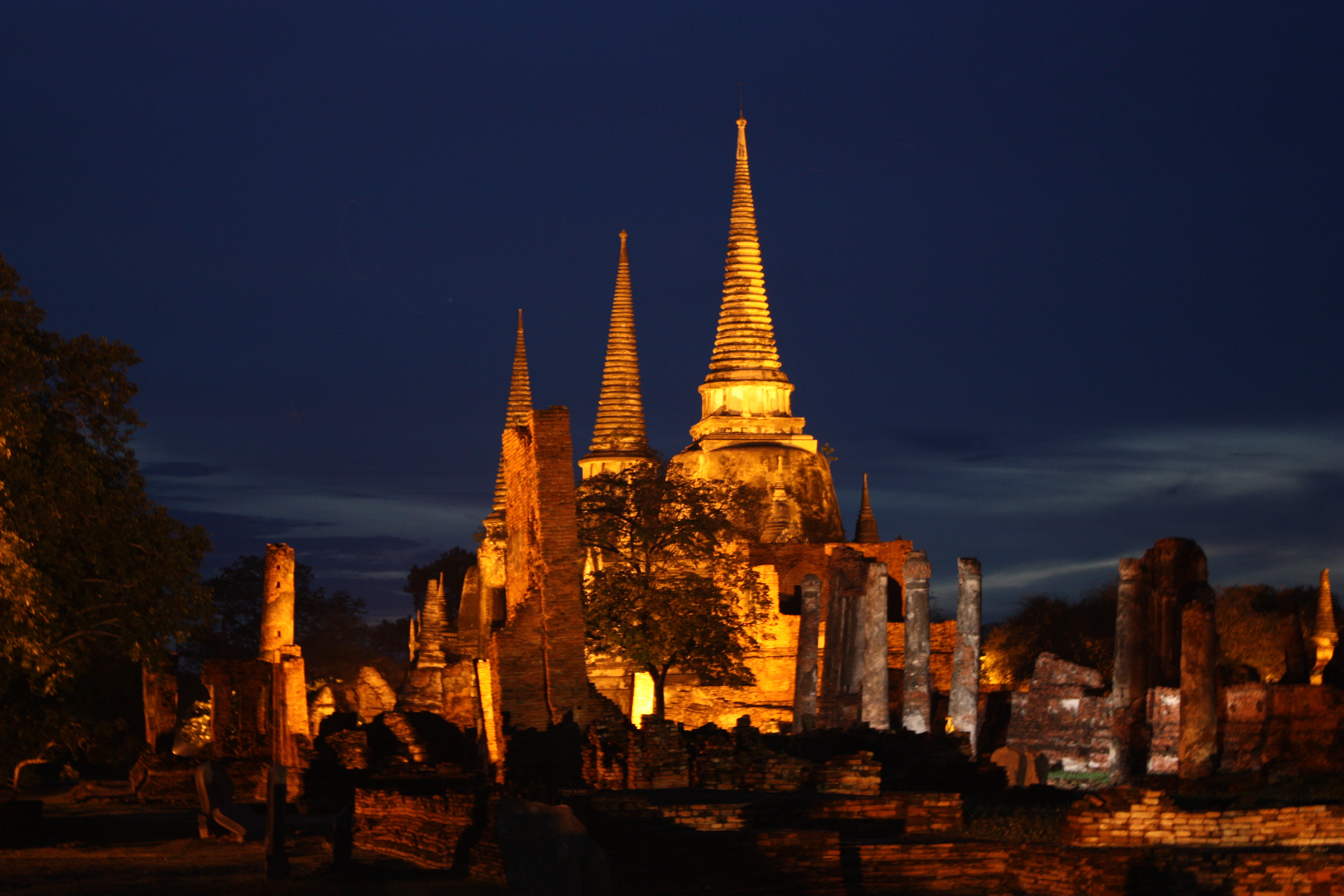
Wat Phra Si Sanphet at night

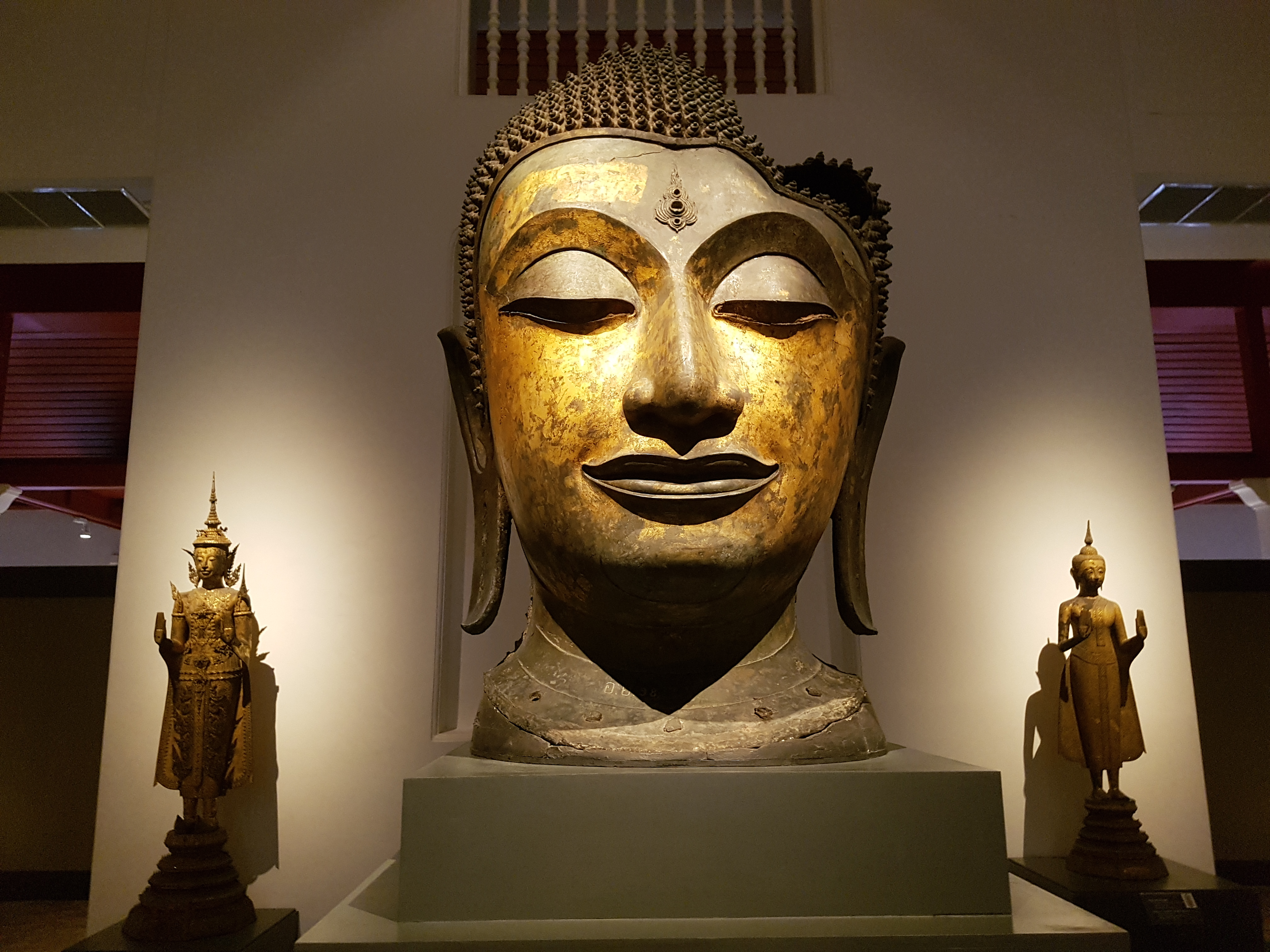
Buddha head, c. 16th century CE

In its final stage before its destruction the temple was an impressive structure. Additional facilities were located on a raised platform, the three Chedis, which are today the only buildings which have been restored. All the other foundations are still preserved.

There are several small chapels, which lead to steep stairs. The roofs of the chapels are in turn topped with a miniature Chedi.

The terrace of the Chedi with Mondop was surrounded by a cloister (Phra Rabieng), in each case a hall was built in the west and in the east, an arrangement as can be seen in many temples in the country today. The building in the West actually consisted of four individual viharn, which were arranged in a cross shape to a Mondop around. The building to the east was the viharn Luang. It contained the statue of Phra Si Sanphet Phuttha.

Symmetrically around the viharn Luang were grouped four other halls. North was a viharn which was a smaller than the viharn Luang, and large enough to accommodate the more than 10 m high statue of Phra Phuttha Lokanat. East front was the Phra Chom Thong Tinang Throne Hall.

Around the entire complex there drew a high perimeter wall, four gates passages in the four directions offered access to the temple. Inside along the wall were alternately small Chedis and low pavilions (Sala), some of which are intact.
