= 1548 =

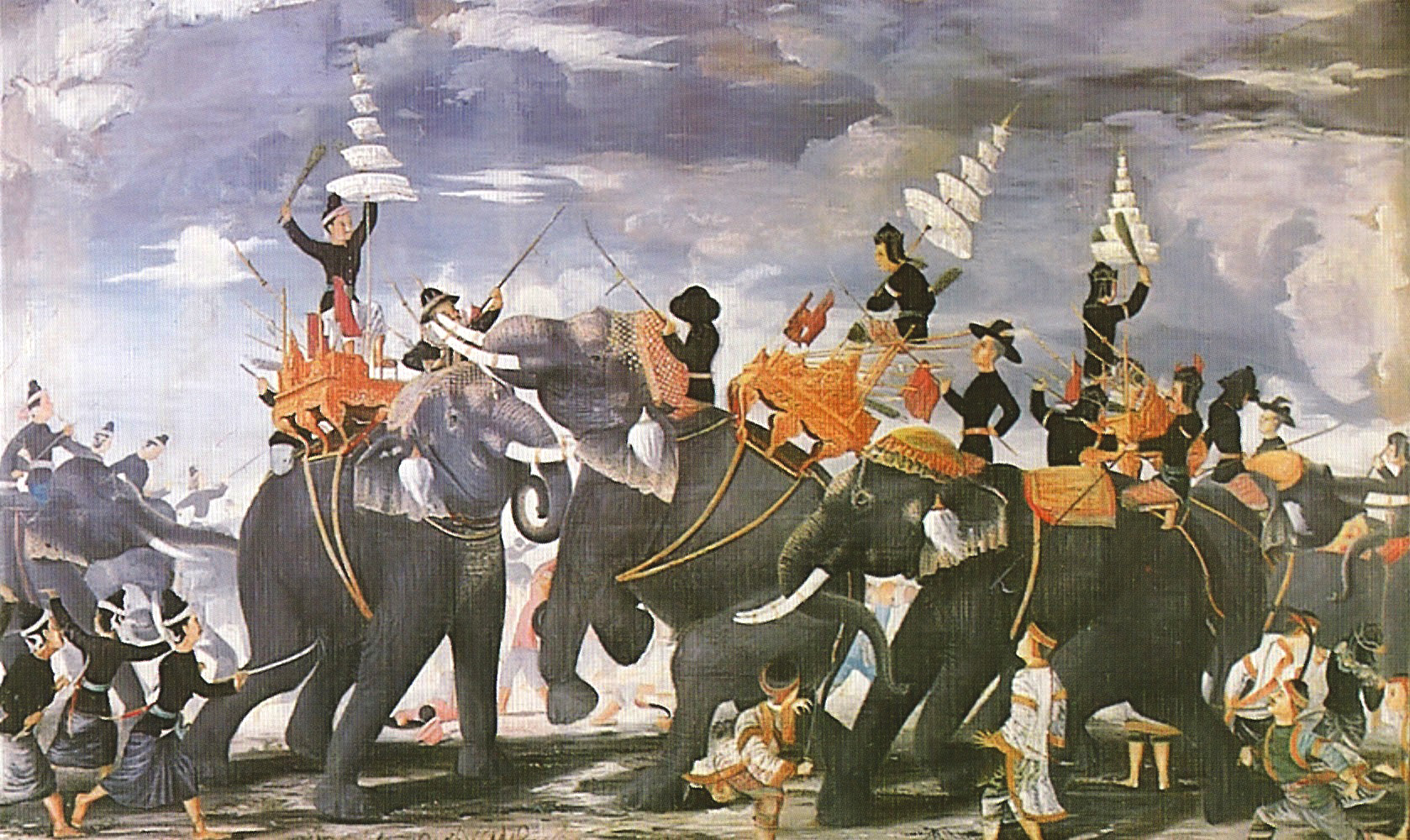
December: The Burmese–Siamese War of 1548 starts.

Year 1548 (MDXLVIII) was a leap year starting on Sunday of the Julian calendar.

== Events ==
=== January–March ===
- January 5 – Abu al-Abbas Ahmad III, ruler of the Hafsid Sultanate in what is now Tunisia in northern Africa, renews the 1547 treaty of friendship with Spain that had been signed by representatives of his father.
- January 19 – Three ships from the Portuguese Navy arrive at the port of Aden to assist Mohammed bin Ali al-Tawlaki, who has been defending the city against an attack by the Ottoman Navy. The Portuguese ships are forced to retreat to Zeila in Somalia, where 120 survivors are captured and their ships are burned.
- January 27 – King Henri II of France makes the Châtillon agreement, a contract for betrothal for an arranged marriage between his four year old son, Prince Francois, to the five year old Mary, Queen of Scots, to take place in 1558.
- January 28 – (Tenbun 17, 30th day of 12th month) Nagao Kagetora (later Uesugi Kenshin) leads a triumphant entry into Kasugayama Castle in Japan, replacing his older brother Nagao Harukage as the lead samurai in the Nagao clan that rules the Echigo Province.
- February 2 – On Candlemas day in Scotland, during the Rough Wooing War with England, the Byllye Castle near Auchencrow is captured by a force of 11 English soldiers led by Thomas Carlile, and becomes a garrison for English troops.
- February 14 – (Tenbun 18, 4th day of 1st month) At the Battle of Uedahara, firearms are used for the first time on the battlefield in Japan, and Takeda Shingen is defeated by Murakami Yoshikiyo.
- February 26 – The Ottoman Navy, led by Admiral Ahmed Muhiddin Piri (commonly known as Piri Reis), recaptures Aden.
- March 9 – Le Trung Tong becomes the new Emperor of Dai Viet (corresponding to northern Vietnam) upon the death of his father, Lê Trang Tông.

=== April–June ===
- April 1 – Sigismund II Augustus succeeds his father, Sigismund I the Old, as King of Poland and Grand Duke of Lithuania.
- April 15 – General Zhu Wan of Ming dynasty China dispatches a fleet of ships, commanded by Lu Tang, to destroy smugglers and pirates at Shangyu, a port on Liuheng Island. The fleet sets off from Wenzhou and makes its attack in June.
- May 15 –
  - The Diet of Augsburg approves a decree of Charles V, Holy Roman Emperor, the "Declaration of His Roman Imperial Majesty on the Observance of Religion Within the Holy Empire Until the Decision of the General Council", informally referred to as the Augsburg Interim, directing German Protestants to resume the doctrine of the Roman Catholic Church, including observance of the Seven Sacraments. As a concession, the Emperor allows the continuation of some Protestant customs, including the right of Protestant clergy to marry and for believers to receive the Protestant communion of bread and wine.
  - Ratan Singh of Amber, Raja of the Amber Kingdom in what is now the Indian state of Rajasthan, is poisoned by his younger brother Askaran, Raja of Narwar.
- June 1 –
  - The Japanese city of Uchiyama in Shinano Province (now in the Nagano Prefecture) is burned by the clan of Murakami Yoshikiyo after the February defeat of the Takeda clan at the Battle of Uedahara.
  - Bharmal becomes the new raja of the Kingdom of Amber, in territory now occupied by India's Rajasthan state, upon the overthrow of his nephew, Askaran, Raja of Narwar, who had reigned for only 16 days.
- June 10 – (5th day of the waxing moon in the 8th month of the 910th year of the Chula Sakarat Era): Yotfa, the 13-year-old ruler of the Ayutthaya Kingdom of Thailand since 1546, is murdered with the consent of his mother, the regent Si Sudachan, who installs her lover, Worawongsathirat, on the throne. Yotfa's younger brother, Prince Sissin, is spared from execution. Worawongsathirat and Si Sudachan are both killed in a counter-coup in November.
- June 11 – Suleiman the Magnificent, the Sultan of the Ottoman Empire begins an invasion of Safavid Iran that will last for almost two years before he abandons it.
- June 16 – The first of 8,000 French troops under the command of General André de Montalembert arrive at the port of Leith at the invitation of the King of Scotland, who seeks to drive out the occupying forces of the Army of England.
- June 30 – The Augsburg Interim, approved May 15, is codified into law in the Holy Roman Empire.
- June
  - Ming Chinese naval forces commanded by Zhu Wan destroy the pirate haven of Shuangyu, frequented by Chinese, Japanese and Portuguese smugglers.
  - John Dee starts to study at the Old University of Leuven.

=== July–September ===
- July 7 – A marriage treaty is signed between Scotland and France, whereby five-year-old Mary, Queen of Scots, is betrothed to the future King Francis II of France.
- August 7 – Mary, Queen of Scots, leaves for France.
- September 13 – Archduke Maximilian of Austria, is married to his first cousin, Maria of Spain, at the arrangement of Charles V, Holy Roman Emperor, Maria's father and Maximilian's uncle. Charles, who also serves as King of Spain, makes the arrangement in order to have the couple serve as his regents while he travels to Germany.

=== October–December ===
- October 1 – Archduke Maximilian and Princess Maria, who married 18 days earlier, become the co-regents of Spain as King Charles V departs for Germany to administer the affairs of the Holy Roman Empire. They serve until Prince Philip, the first regent, returns from battle on July 12, 1551.
- October 20 – The city of La Paz, Bolivia, is founded.
- October 31 – At the first sejm of King Sigismund II Augustus of Poland, deputies demand that the king renounce his wife Barbara Radziwiłł.
- November 11 – Worawongsathirat, ruler of the Ayutthaya Kingdom of Thailand after usurping the throne on June 10, stages his coronation along with his wife, Si Sudachan. Both husband and wife had after both conspired to murder her son, King Yofta, in June. The King and Queen are assassinated on January 13, 1549.
- December 17 – King João III of Portugal, creates a colonial government of Brazil, with a capital at Bahia, in order to maintain unity among various Portuguese captaincies (São Vicente, Nova Lusitania, Ilhéus and Porto Seguro) scattered along the coast. The document contains 48 articles governing the installation of the government, the organization of trade, measures for defense, treatment of the indigenous tribes, and policies toward foreigners. The King provides for a Governor-General, and appoints Tomé de Sousa as the first officeholder.
- December – Siam attacks Tavoy, beginning the Burmese–Siamese War of 1548.

== Births ==
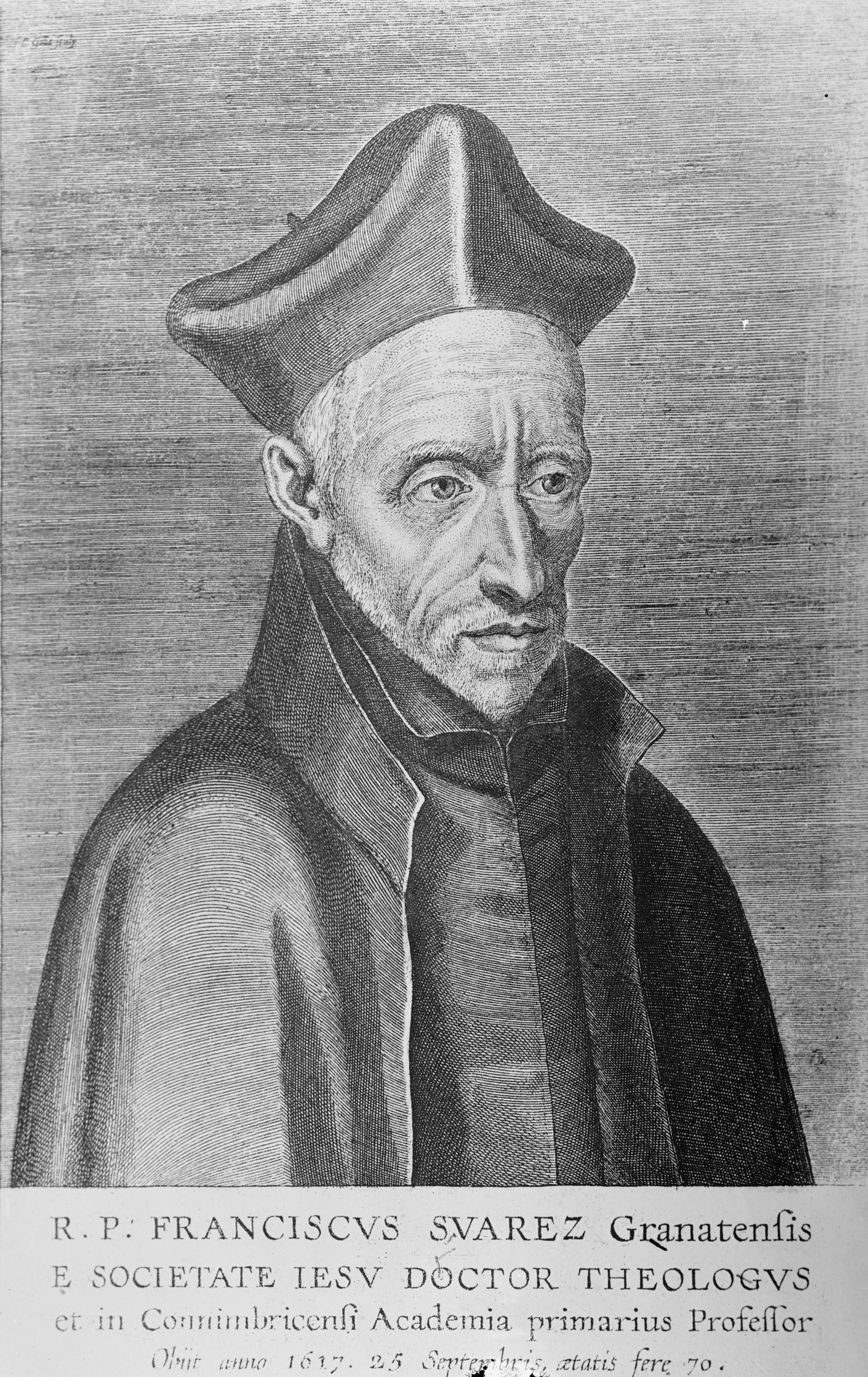
Francisco Suarez

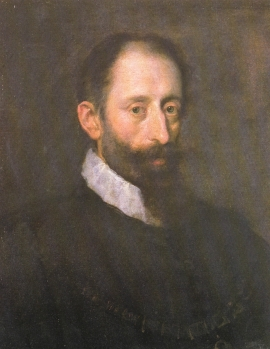
William V, Duke of Bavaria

- January 5 – Francisco Suárez, Spanish priest, philosopher, theologian and saint (d. 1617)
- February 6 – Francesco Panigarola, Italian bishop (d. 1594)
- March 13 – Sasbout Vosmeer, Dutch Apostolic Vicar (d. 1614)
- March 17 – Honda Tadakatsu, Japanese general (d. 1610)
- March 18 – Cornelis Ketel, Dutch painter (d. 1616)
- April 15 – Pietro Cataldi, Italian mathematician (d. 1626)
- May – Carel van Mander, Dutch painter and poet (d. 1606)
- May 8 – Giacomo Boncompagni, illegitimate son of Pope Gregory XIII (d. 1612)
- May 10 – Antonio Priuli, Doge of Venice (d. 1623)
- July 8 – Kim Jang-saeng, Korean scholar and writer (d. 1631)
- July 15 – George III, Count of Erbach-Breuberg (1564–1605) (d. 1605)
- August – Pari Khan Khanum, Persian princess (d. 1578)
- August 26 – Bernardino Poccetti, Italian painter (d. 1612)
- September 2 – Vincenzo Scamozzi, Italian architect (d. 1616)
- September 7 – Filippo Boncompagni, Italian Catholic cardinal (d. 1586)
- September 29 – William V, Duke of Bavaria (d. 1626)
- October 4 – Matsumae Yoshihiro, Japanese daimyō of Ezochi (Hokkaidō) (d. 1616)
- November 27 – Jacopo Mazzoni, Italian philosopher (d. 1598)
- December 30 – David Pareus, German theologian (d. 1622)
- approx. date – Ma Shouzhen, Chinese Gējì, painter, playwright and poet (d. 1604)
- date unknown
  - Giordano Bruno, Italian philosopher, astronomer, and occultist (d. 1600)
  - Luis Barahona de Soto, Spanish poet (d. 1595)
  - William Stanley, English soldier (d. 1630)
  - Saitō Tatsuoki, Japanese daimyō (d. 1573)
  - Sidonia von Borcke, German noble and alleged witch (d. 1620)
  - Tomás Luis de Victoria, Spanish composer (d. 1611)
  - Fernando Ruiz de Castro Andrade y Portugal, Grandee of Spain (d. 1601)
- probable
  - Francesco Andreini, Italian actor (d. 1624)
  - Francesco Soriano, Italian composer (d. 1621)
  - Mariangiola Criscuolo, Italian painter (d. 1630)
  - Simon Stevin, Flemish mathematician and engineer (d. 1620)

== Deaths ==
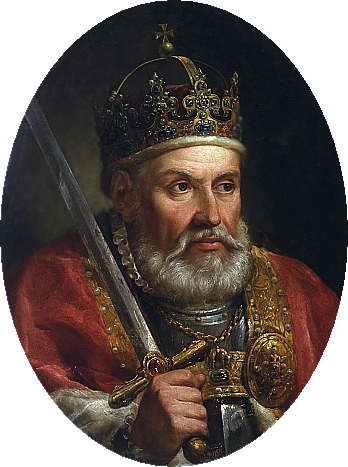
King Sigismund I the Old

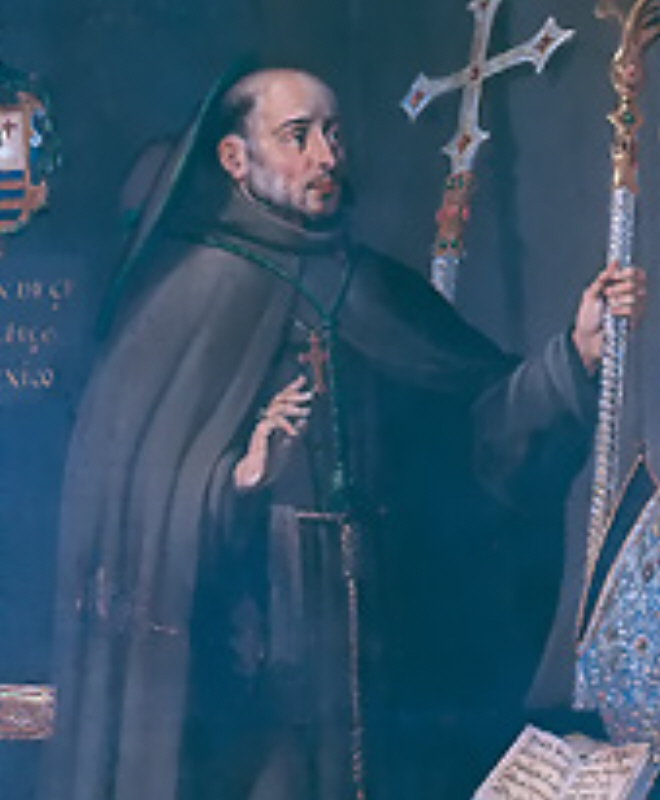
Saint Juan de Zumarraga

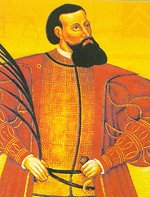
Joao de Castro

- January 9 – Matthäus Zell, German Lutheran pastor (b. 1477)
- January 23 – Bernardo Pisano, Italian composer (b. 1490)
- February 26 – Lorenzino de' Medici, Italian writer and assassin (b. 1514)
- March 23 – Itagaki Nobukata, Japanese retainer
- March 24 – Gissur Einarsson, first Lutheran bishop in Iceland
- April 1 – King Sigismund I the Old of Poland (b. 1467)
- June 3 – Juan de Zumárraga, Spanish Catholic bishop of Mexico (b. 1468)
- June 6 – João de Castro, Portuguese explorer (b. 1500)
- June 14 – Carpentras, French composer (b. c. 1470)
- July 4 – Philip, Duke of Palatinate-Neuburg, German duke (b. 1503)
- July 29 – Gian Gabriele I of Saluzzo, Italian abbot, Marquess of Saluzzo (b. 1501)
- August 2 – Henry II, Duke of Münsterberg-Oels and Count of Glatz (b. 1507)
- September 5 – Catherine Parr, sixth and last Queen of Henry VIII of England (b. c. 1512)
- September 8 – John III of Pernstein, Bohemian land-owner, Governor of Moravia and Count of Kladsko (b. 1487)
- October 27 – Johannes Dantiscus, Polish poet and Bishop of Warmia (b. 1485)
- November 16 – Caspar Creuziger, German humanist (b. 1504)
- December 27 – Francesco Spiera, Italian Protestant jurist (b. 1502)
- date unknown
  - Juan Diego Cuauhtlatoatzin, Mexican Catholic saint (b. 1474)
  - Chief Queen Sri Suriyothai, consort of King Maha Chakkrapat of Ayutthaya (killed in battle)
  - Strongilah, Jewish Ottoman businesswoman.
