= Kamani =

Kamani may refer to:

== Places ==
- Pobiti Kamani or Pobitite Kamani, a rock phenomenon in Varna Province, Bulgaria
- Kamani, Bhamo, a village in north-eastern Burma
- Kamani, Iran, a village in Hamadan Province, Iran
- Kamani, Georgia, a village in the disputed region of Abkhazia
  - Kamani massacre, 1993, during the Georgian-Abkhaz conflict
  - Kamani Monastery
- Kamani, a village in Suriname

== People ==
=== Surname ===
- Kamani (surname)

=== Given name ===
- Kamani Hill, American soccer player
- Kamani Johnson, American basketball player
- Kamani (king), Neo-Hittite king of Carchemish

== Other uses ==
- Kamani Engineering Corporation, an electric power transmission company in India
- Calophyllum inophyllum or kamani, a species of large evergreen

== See also ==
- Kaman (disambiguation)
