= Ratsadathirat =

Ratsadathirat รัษฎาธิราช

King of Ayutthaya
- Reign: Five months, 895 LE (1533/34 CE) – 896 LE (1534/35 CE)
- Predecessor: Borommarachathirat IV
- Successor: Chairachathirat
- Born: 890 LE (1528/29 CE)
- Died: 896 LE (1534/35 CE)
- Dynasty: Suphannaphum
- Father: Borommarachathirat IV

Ratsadathirat (Thai: รัษฎาธิราช, Raṣṭādhirāj) was the twelfth king of Ayutthaya, an ancient kingdom in Thailand. He was a son of Borommarachathirat IV and succeeded his father to the throne of Ayutthaya at the age of five in 895 LE (2076 BE, 1533/34 CE). The following year, after having been on the throne for five months, he was put to death by his relative, Chairachathirat, who then assumed the kingship.

== Names ==
According to the Royal Autograph Chronicle and its variant versions, his name is Ratthathirat (รัฏฐาธิราช; Thai pronunciation: [rät̚˥.tʰäː˩˥.tʰi˥.räːt̚˥˩]; literally "overlord of the realm") or Ratthathiratchakuman (รัฏฐาธิราชกุมาร; Thai pronunciation: [rät̚˥.tʰäː˩˥.tʰi˥.räːt̚˥˩.t͡ɕʰä˥.ku˩.mä̃ːn˧]; literally "child overlord of the realm").

But he is better known by the name Ratsadathirat (รัษฎาธิราช; Thai pronunciation: [rät̚˥.sä˩.däː˧.tʰi˥.räːt̚˥˩]), which is a Sanskrit variant of the Pali name Ratthathirat.

In the Van Vliet Chronicle, written in 1640 CE by Dutch Merchant Jeremias Van Vliet, his name is written as Woo-Rhae Rassa Thae Thieraya.

== Life ==
=== Birth ===
All Thai and foreign chronicles say that Ratsadathirat was a son of Borommarachathirat IV, the eleventh king of the Kingdom of Ayutthaya, and that Ratsadathirat was only five years old when he ascended the throne in 895 LE (2076 BE, 1533/34 CE). Ratsadathirat was possibly born in 890 LE (2071 BE, 1528/29 CE). Modern scholars have suggested that his mother was a daughter of a powerful noble who wanted to be related with the royal household through marriage, because the enthronement of Ratsadathirat appears to have been supported by a group of nobles, despite his minority.

=== Accession to the throne and death ===
In 895 LE (2076 BE, 1533/34 CE), Borommarachathirat IV died of smallpox and his son, Ratsadathirat, succeeded him as king of Ayutthaya. In 896 LE (2077 BE, 1534/35 CE), after Ratsadathirat had been on the throne for five months, Chairachathirat seized the throne and had Ratsadathirat executed. The execution was carried out according to the palace law, that is, by covering the young king with a red sack before striking his neck with a Sandalwood club.

=== Relationship with Chairachathirat ===
Thai and foreign chronicles state that Ratsadathirat and Chairachathirat were relatives. But none of these documents gives enough information that makes clear the relationship between the two. The Buddhist Councils Chronicle says Chairachathirat was a nephew (son of an elder or younger sister) of Ramathibodi II, who was the father of Borommarachathirat IV. The Royal Autograph Chronicle and its variant versions merely say Chairachathirat was a relative of Ramathibodi II, the father of Borommarachathirat IV. The Van Vliet Chronicle says Chairachathirat was a distant relative of Ratsadathirat and served as the regent during the latter's reign.

Historian Damrongrachanuphap made a suggestion that Chairachathirat was the viceroy of Ayutthaya (ex officio ruler of Phitsanulok) during the reigns of Borommarachathirat IV and Ratsadathirat. That is why it took Chairachathirat five months to arrive in Ayutthaya and seize the throne. Modern scholars have suggested that another reason why Chairachathirat had to wait for five months before launching the coup is his need to check the attitude of each political faction and to await "a good opportunity", because Ratsadathirat was still supported by a group of nobles led by a powerful noble who seemed to be Ratsadathirat's grandfather (father of Ratsadathirat's mother).

Moreover, the enthronement of Ratsadathirat was against tradition, because the viceroy had always been the first in line to succeed to the throne. For that reason, modern scholars are of an opinion that Ratsadathirat's ascension to the throne enraged Chairachathirat and the coup therefore resulted in "unnecessary violence", that is, the execution of the deposed five-year-old king. The coup also made Ratsadathirat the second king from the House of Suphannaphum to be executed.

== Bibliography ==
- Chula Chakrabongse (1960). Lords of Life: A History of the Kings of Thailand. London: Alvin Redman.
- Khruea-thong, Pramin (2012-01-22). "Krung si patiwat: nueng roi pi haeng khwam ngiap rai 'patiwat' nai ratchawong suphannaphum" กรุงศรีปฏิวัติ: ๑๐๐ ปีแห่งความเงียบ ไร้ 'ปฏิวัติ' ในราชวงศ์สุพรรณภูมิ [Ayutthayan coups: a hundred years of silence - no 'coup' in Suphannaphum Dynasty]. Archdiocese of Bangkok (in Thai). Matichon. Archived from the original on 2015-05-19.
- Phra Ratchaphongsawadan Chabap Phra Ratchahatthalekha Lem Nueng พระราชพงศาวดาร ฉบับพระราชหัตถเลขา เล่ม 1 [Royal Chronicle of Siam: Royal Autograph Version, Volume 1] (in Thai) (8th ed.). Bangkok: Fine Arts Department of Thailand. 1991. ISBN 9744171448.
- Prachum Phongsawadan Chabap Kanchanaphisek Lem Nueng ประชุมพงศาวดาร ฉบับกาญจนาภิเษก เล่ม 1 [Golden Jubilee Collection of Historical Archives, Volume 1]. Bangkok: Fine Arts Department of Thailand. 1999. ISBN 9744192151.
- Princess Maha Chakri Sirindhorn Foundation (2011). Namanukrom Phra Mahakasat Thai นามานุกรมพระมหากษัตริย์ไทย [Directory of Thai Kings] (in Thai). Bangkok: Princess Maha Chakri Sirindhorn Foundation. ISBN 9786167308258.
- Van Vliet, Jeremias (2003). Wyatt, David K. (ed.). Phongsawadan Krung Si Ayutthaya Chabap Wan Walit Phutthasakkarat Song Phan Nueng Roi Paet Sip Song พงศาวดารกรุงศรีอยุธยา ฉบับวันวลิต พ.ศ. 2182 [1640 Chronicle of Ayutthaya: Van Vliet Version] (in Thai) (2nd ed.). Bangkok: Matichon. ISBN 9743229221.

Ratsadathirat House of Suphannaphum Born: 890 LE (1528/29 CE) Died: 896 LE (1534/35 CE)
Regnal titles
Preceded by Borommarachathirat IV	King of Ayutthaya; Five months from 895 LE (1533/34 CE) to 896 LE (1534/35 CE)	Succeeded by Chairachathirat
