= Kamani (surname) =

Kamani is a surname. Notable people with the surname include:

- Bayano Kamani (born 1980), Panamanian hurdler
- Kamin Kamani, Thai writer
- Mahmud Kamani (born 1964), British businessman, co-founder of Boohoo.com
- Ramji H. Kamani (1888–1965), Indian industrialist from Gujarat
- Titus Kamani (born 1957), Tanzanian politician
- Umar Kamani (born 1988), British businessman, son of Mahmud

== See also ==
- Kamani (disambiguation)
