= Kanlayanee Si Thammarat School =

Location
- Nakhon Si Thammarat; Thailand
- Coordinates: 8.429991°N 99.963934°E

Information
- Type: Public
- Established: June 1912
- Website: https://www.benjama.ac.th

Kanlayanee Si Thammarat School (Thai: โรงเรียนกัลยาณีศรีธรรมราช,) is a high school in Nakhon Si Thammarat located in Thailand which was established in 1918 as a provincial girls' school (Thai: โรงเรียนสตรีประจำจังหวัดนครศรีธรรมราช).

== Curriculum ==
This school has 3 programs of study:

- Normal Program
- English Program (EP)
- Science and Mathematics Gifted Program (SMGP)

School colors are white and blue. School's tree is ratchapreuk (ราชพฤกษ์). School motto is: Wisdom is the light of the world.
