= Nakhon Si Thammarat National Museum =

Museum in Nakhon Si Thammarat, Thailand

Coordinates: 8°24′5″N 99°58′13″E

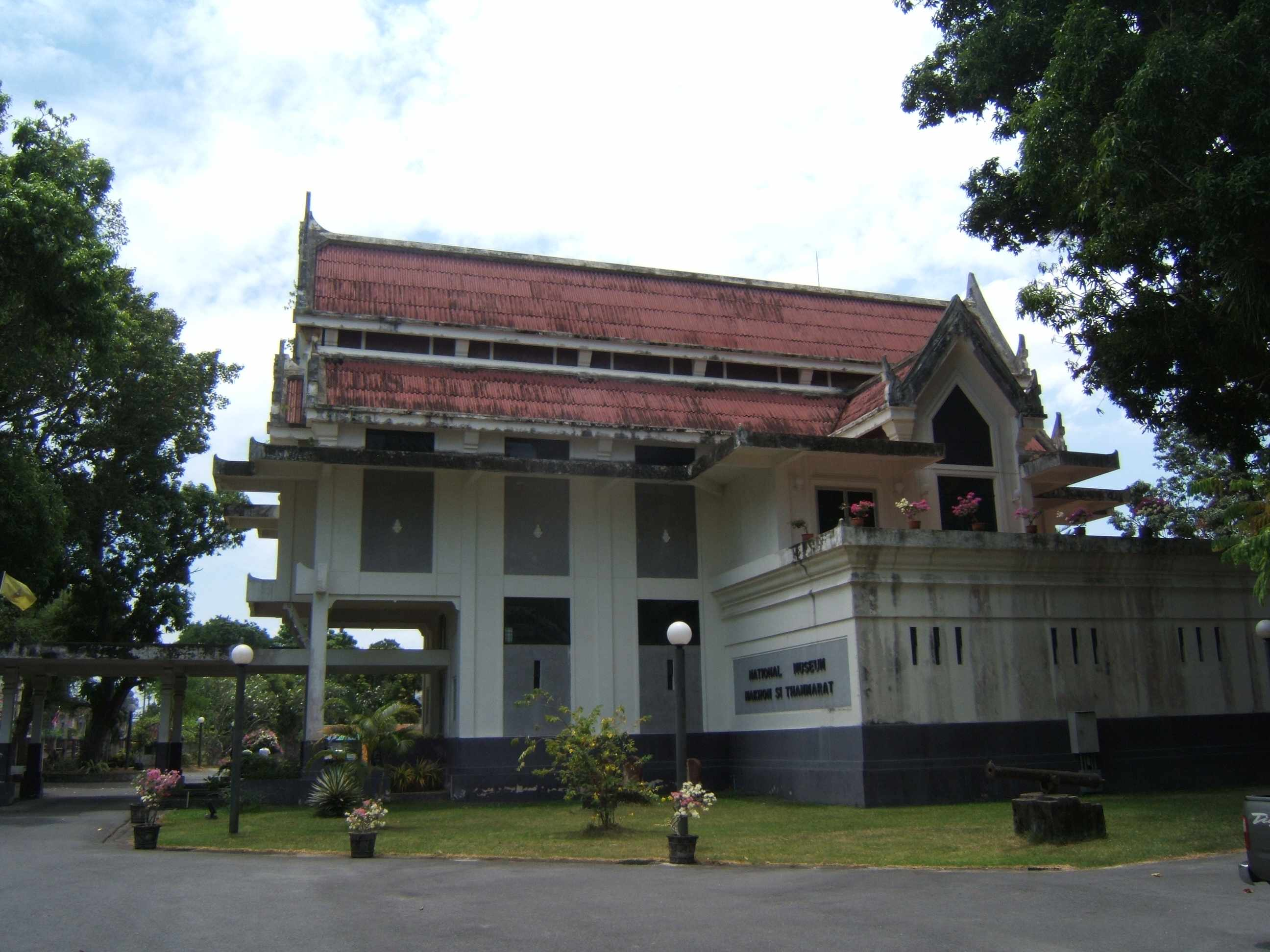
Nakhon Si Thammarat National Museum

Nakhon Si Thammarat National Museum (Thai: พิพิธภัณฑสถานแห่งชาติ นครศรีธรรมราช) is a museum located on Rachadamnoen Road in the town of Nakhon Si Thammarat, Nakhon Si Thammarat Province in southern Thailand. At the centre of the museum is the 9th century statue of Vishnu in the Pala style of southern India. It was found in the base of a tree in Kapong district near Takua Pa in Phang Nga Province, then a major transit point for Indians colonizing the south.

Two bronze drums made by the Dong Son peoples of northern Vietnam are another display in the museum. The Thai gallery displays religious art from Dvaravati and Srivijayan periods to the Rattanakosin era. Various images of Buddha exist in the displays made in the distinctive local Sing style, characterized by stumpy features and animated faces.

The museum was opened in 1974 and covers the area of the former temple Wat Suan Luang Tawan Ok.

== Literature ==
- Lenzi, Iola (2004). Museums of Southeast Asia. Singapore: Archipelago Press. p. 200 pages. ISBN 981-4068-96-9.
