= Duarte Fernandes =

16th-century Portuguese explorer and diplomat

Duarte Fernandes (16th century) was a Portuguese diplomat, explorer, and was the first European to establish diplomatic relations with Thailand, when in 1511 he led a diplomatic mission to Ayutthaya Kingdom (Kingdom of Siam), after the Portuguese conquest of Malacca.

== History ==
Duarte Fernandes was a Portuguese tailor. Born in the late 15th century, Fernandes was a New Christian, a classification used to describe people of Moorish or Jewish heritage. In the early 1500s, Fernandes traveled to Malacca as part of the first expedition of Diogo Lopes de Sequeira in September 1509. When sailors grew anxious that the expedition was delaying a return to Portugal, a number of sailors attempted to force de Sequeira to order the ships home. In the sequence of a failed plot to destroy the expedition, Fernandes was among nineteen Portuguese that stood arrested in Malacca. His amicable nature spared him the fate of the other conspirators. Together with Rui de Araújo, Fernandes gathered knowledge about the culture of the region and became a de facto envoy of Afonso de Albuquerque. During this time he also learned to speak some Malay.

In 1511 the Portuguese conquered Malacca, an action which disrupted the traditional balance of power in Southeast Asia. Knowing that the Kingdom of Siam had claimed lands in Malacca, Albuquerque sent Fernandes in a diplomatic mission to the court of the King of Siam, Ramathibodi II, to explain why Portugal had sized Malacca, to show the power of the Portuguese empire, and to open trade relations between Portugal and Ayutthaya. Fernandes was dispatched along with two Chinese captains and became the first European to arrive in Siam, where he was successful in establishing amicable relations between the Kingdom of Portugal and the Kingdom of Siam, returning with a Siamese envoy bearing gifts and letters to Albuquerque and the king of Portugal. Five years after that initial contact, Ayutthaya and Portugal concluded a treaty granting the Portuguese permission to trade in the kingdom.

Fernandes became one of the first Europeans to take an interest in Chinese shipbuilding, as he traveled in a Chinese junk on his return journey to Malacca and, being a former tailor, was fascinated by the junk's sails.

== Bibliography ==
- Donald Frederick Lach, Edwin J. Van Kley, "Asia in the making of Europe", p. 520-521, University of Chicago Press, 1994, ISBN 978-0-226-46731-3
- Jonathan I. Israel, "Spinoza, Life and Legacy", pp. 113, Oxford University Press, 2023, ISBN 978-0-19-885748-8
