= Kamani Monastery =

20th-century Christian monasteries

Kamani Monastery კამანის ეკლესია (in Georgian) Камантәи ауахәама (in Abkhaz)
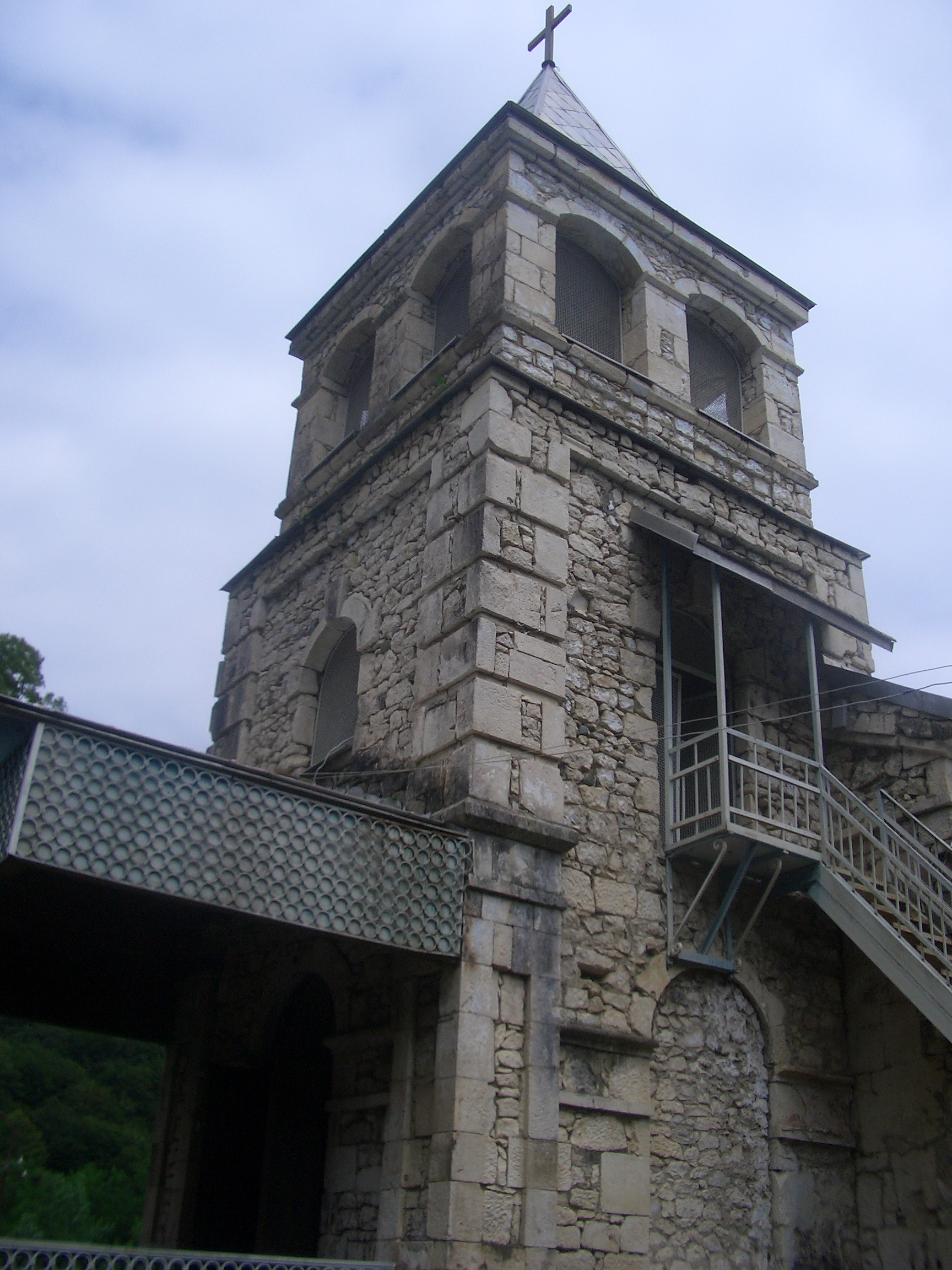
- The Kamani monastery in 2006.

- Location within Abkhazia Location within Georgia

Religion
- Affiliation: Georgian Orthodox
- Province: Abkhazia

Location
- Location: Gantiadi, Gagra District, Abkhazia, Georgia
- Interactive map of Kamani Monastery კამანის ეკლესია (in Georgian); Камантәи ауахәама (in Abkhaz)
- Coordinates: 43°05′43″N 40°59′50″E

Architecture
- Type: Church
- Completed: 1980s

The Kamani Monastery (Georgian: კამანის ეკლესია; Abkhaz: Камантәи ауахәама) is located at the village of Kamani in Abkhazia/Georgia, north of Sokhumi. The monastery building is a 1980s construction on the foundations of a medieval church.

== History ==
The locale of Kamani, also known as Komani, is associated in the local Abkhaz-Georgian legends with Saint John Chrysostom, who allegedly died there after being exiled from Constantinople to the Black Sea coast. In 1884, the Greek scholar Konstantinos Vrissis visited the area and conjectured that it was Kamani, not Comana Pontica, where John Chrysostom died and was initially buried.

Only the foundation survived of a medieval stone monastic building, a hall church design without a protruding apse. In the 1880s, under the Russian rule, a Christian convent was founded there, but it fell in disuse with the arrival of the Soviet power in the region. In the late 1980s, the church was rebuilt through the efforts of the Abkhaz Yuri Anua. In 1990, Ilia II, Catholicos Patriarch of Georgia, consecrated the church. In July 1993, during the War in Abkhazia, the monastery was stormed by the Abkhaz separatist forces; Yuri Anua and the Georgian priest Andria Kurashvili were killed.

In 2001, a group of Abkhaz monks returned to the Kamani monastery, which was transferred by the Sokhumi government, in 2011, in possession of the self-proclaimed Abkhazian Orthodox Church. Georgia has inscribed the church on the list of cultural heritage and reported, in 2015, the physical condition of the monument as poor.
