= Borommarachathirat III (Borommaracha) =

King of Ayutthaya from 1488 to 1491

Borommarachathirat III บรมราชาธิราชที่ ๓

King of Ayutthaya
- Reign: 1488–1491
- Predecessor: Borommatrailokkanat
- Successor: Chetthathirat
- Born: 1463
- Died: 1491 (aged 27–28)
Names
- Somdet Phra Borommaracha Thirat III
- Dynasty: Suphannaphum
- Father: Trailokanat

Borommarachathirat III, or Borom Rachathirat III (Thai: บรมราชาธิราชที่ ๓) was the king of Ayutthaya from 1488 to 1491. He was a son of Trailokanat and served as Trailokanat’s regent in Ayutthaya during his father’s campaigns against Lanna in the north. Trailokanat died in 1488 and Borommarachathirat succeeded his father. Upon ascension, he moved the capital back to Ayutthaya. The throne of Sukhothai at Pitsanulok, however, was succeeded by his brother Prince Chettathirat.

His reign, however, was short. He sent Siamese armies to capture the Mon city of Dawei in 1491 and died the same year.

He was succeeded by his brother, Prince Chettathirat as Ramathibodi II.

Borommarachathirat III (Borommaracha) House of Suphannaphum Born: 1462 Died: 1491
Regnal titles
Preceded by Borommatrailokkanat	King of Ayutthaya; 1488–1491	Succeeded by Ramathibodi II
