= Chairachathirat =

King of Ayutthaya from 1534 to 1546

Chairachathirat ไชยราชาธิราช

King of Ayutthaya
- Reign: 1534–1546
- Predecessor: Ratsadathirat
- Successor: Yotfa
- Born: 1499
- Died: 1546 (aged 46–47)
- Spouse: Chitwadi; Sri Sudachan
- Issue: Yotfa; Sisin
Names
- Chairachathirat
- Dynasty: Suphannaphum
- Father: Ramathibodi II

Chairachathirat (Thai: ไชยราชาธิราช, Jaiyarājādhirāja), or Chai was from 1534 to 1546 the King of Ayutthaya, an ancient kingdom in Thailand. His reign was notable for the increasing presence of Portuguese traders, soldiers, and the introduction of firearms and other modern military technologies to Siam.

Ayutthaya during Chairacha's reign

Chairachathirat ascended the throne following the short reign of King Ratsadathirat, and ruled during a period of internal consolidation and growing foreign contact. His court maintained relations with the Lan Xang and Lanna kingdoms, while also contending with Burmese incursions from Toungoo Burma. He was succeeded by his young son, Yotfa, under the regency of Sri Sudachan.

== Birth ==
The evidence regarding his father is not yet clear; the Royal Chronicle by the Venerable Vanarata of Pakaeo Temple and the Royal Chronicle (Rattanakosin edition) only state that King Chairachathirat is of the royal family of King Ramathibodi. The Pali text "Sangitiyavansa", authored in the reign of King Rama I by the Venerable Vanarata of Pho Temple, state that he is the nephew (son of the sister) of Ramathibodi However, historical records suggest he was likely the son of King Ramathibodi II.

== Coup ==
In 1533, following the death of King Borommaracha IV, Prince Ratsadathirat (Borommaracha IV's son) succeeded to the Ayutthayan throne. Governmental authority under five-year-old Ratsadathirat proved to be weak. In 1534, only five months after his nephew's ascension, Chairacha marched to Ayutthaya to stage a coup, killed his nephew, and took the throne of Ayutthaya.

== King of Ayutthaya ==
=== Burmese invasion of Muang Chiang Kran ===
In 1539, King Tabinshwehti attacked the Mon people inhabiting Chiang Kran, which was under Siamese rule. Chairachathirat "marched against Chiang Kran" with the aid of 120 Portuguese traders in Ayutthaya and drove the Burmese back. The Portuguese were then allowed to build a church near the Takhian Canal to practice their religion.

=== Sukhothai nobles ===
Chairacha appointed his brother Prince Thianracha (later Maha Chakkrapat) as the Uparaja but did not grant him the title of King of Sukhothai as Chairacha was trying to unite the two kingdoms by reducing the power of Sukhothai nobles. He also called the Sukhothai nobles to Ayutthaya to move them from their base at Pitsanulok and made Ayutthaya the sole center of authority.

== Mysterious death ==
Though not having a son by a queen, Chai did have one, Yodfa, from Lady Sudachan, his favorite Chao Chom. However, she had a secret lover, Worawongsathirat, an officer of the Guards. Returning from the north, Chai became ill and died, and suspicion fell on Lady Sudachan. Her eleven-year-old son, Yodfa, became king in 1546. Chai's half brother, Prince Thianracha, became regent but entered a monastery to escape the ensuing power struggle. Sudachan became pregnant by Worawongsathirat and Yodfa was soon murdered. Khun Worawongsa assumed power. Khun Piren, and other retired officers, then ambushed the king and queen, and placed Thianracha on the throne in 1549.

Chairachathirat Suphannaphum Dynasty Born: ? Died: 1546
Regnal titles
Preceded by Ratsadathirat	King of Ayutthaya; 1534–1546	Succeeded by Yotfa
Preceded by Athittayawong	Ruler of Phitsanulok; 1529–1534	Succeeded by Maha Thammaracha
