= Kamani, Georgia =

Kamani კამანი, Каман, Каман
- Village
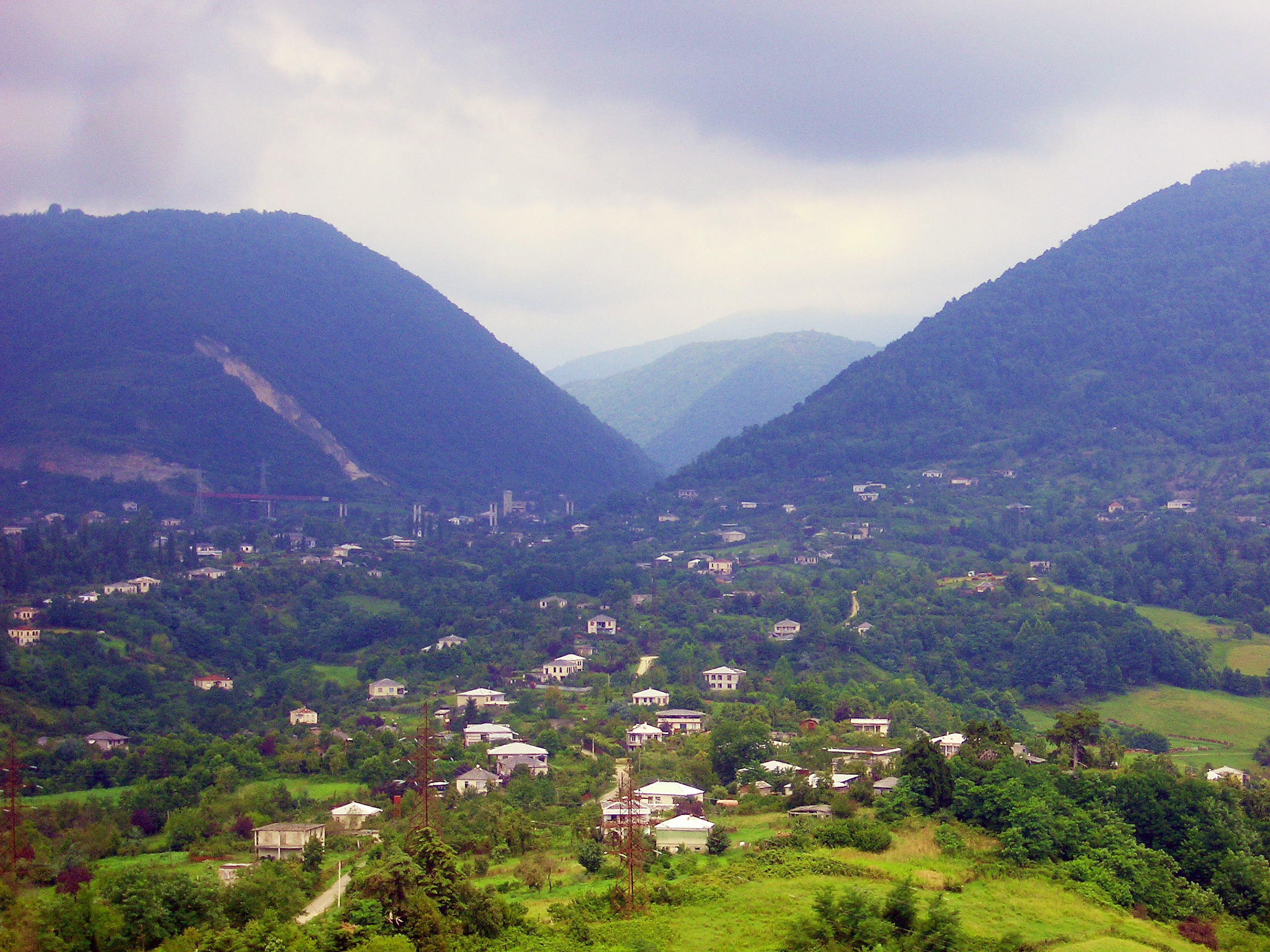
- Kamani village

- Location in Georgia
- Coordinates: 43°3′29″N 41°2′37″E
- Country: Georgia
- Partially recognized independent country: Abkhazia
- District: Sukhumi
- Elevation: 160 m (520 ft)
- Time zone: UTC+4 (GET)

Kamani (Georgian: კამანი) is a small village in Abkhazia, the disputed region of Georgia. It is notable for the Kamani Monastery and the 1993 Kamani massacre.

== History ==
The Kamani Massacre took place on July 9, 1993, during the Georgian-Abkhaz conflict. It was perpetrated against Georgian inhabitants of Kamani (a small village located north of Sokhumi), mainly by militia forces of Abkhaz separatists, and their North Caucasian and Russian allies. It became a part of the bloody campaign carried out by the separatists, which was known as the ethnic cleansing of Georgians in Abkhazia.
