= Battle of Kamani =

1993 battle during the War in Abkhazia

- Part of the July Offensive of the 1992–1993 war in Abkhazia and the ethnic cleansing of Georgians in Abkhazia
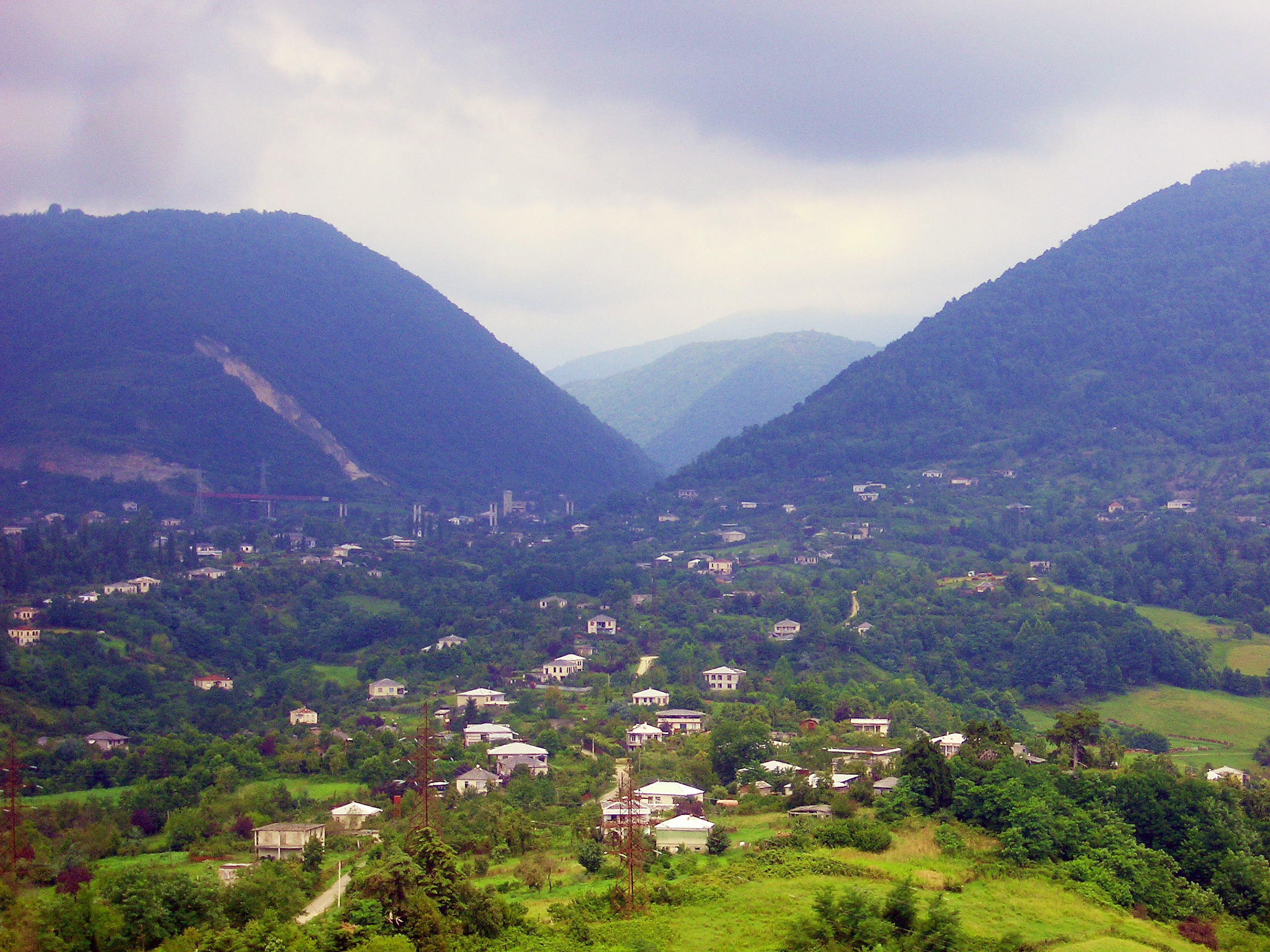
- The village of Kamani.
Date	July 9, 1993
Location	Kamani, Abkhazia 43.057965°N 41.043731°E
Result	Abkhazian victory: Massacre of Georgian civilians; destruction of the village

Belligerents
(Georgia (country)) Georgia: Mkhedrioni	Abkhazia: Abkhazian Armed Forces; Bagramyan Battalion; Russian separatists; CMPC

Commanders and leaders
Unknown	Unknown

Strength
Unknown (primarily civilian population)	Unknown

Casualties and losses
"Many": 120–500 civilians killed	Unknown

The Battle of Kamani was a battle in the War in Abkhazia (1992–1993), on July 9, 1993. The village was captured and many of its inhabitants were massacred or fled.

== Events ==
During the War in Abkhazia in 1992–1993, the villages along the Gumista River (north and east of Sukhumi) such as Kamani, Shroma, and Achadara were mainly populated by ethnic Georgians.

However, the area was very important strategically, as it enabled motorized units to reach Sukhumi, the capital of the autonomous republic. After a failed attempt to storm Sukhumi from the west, the Abkhaz formations and their allies diverted their offensive on the northern and eastern sides of Sukhumi. The Georgian National Guard, volunteer units and battalions made up by local civilians, were taken by surprise. The Georgian side had not expected a offensive from the north or east. Due to this manoeuvring, the Abkhaz and their allies cut through the Georgian front line and attacked the villages along the side of the Gumista River. The Georgians suffered many losses and the defensive line around Sukhumi was breached. On July 5, Abkhaz, Russian and North Caucasian detachments and the Armenian Bagramyan Battalion stormed the villages of Akhalsheni, Guma and Shroma of Sukhumi district. The village residents were rounded up and massacred. The last offensive took place on July 9 against the village of Kamani. Kamani was a Svan (a sub-ethnic group of the Georgian people) village which also included the Kamani Monastery and convent housing priests and nuns.

The Georgian forces who were protecting the pathways to Kamani were annihilated early in the morning, after which the main assault on the village was undertaken at 10 a.m. Within a couple of hours the village fell to Abkhaz separatists and their allies. Soon after, the Abkhaz and their allies started a violent rampage against the inhabitants of Kamani, torturing and killing civilians, men, women and children alike.

== See also ==
- Ethnic cleansing of Georgians in Abkhazia
