= Worawongsathirat =

Worawongsathirat วรวงศาธิราช

King of Ayutthaya
- Reign: before 10 June 1548
- Coronation: 11 November 1548
- Predecessor: Yotfa
- Successor: Maha Chakkraphat
- Born: c. 1503
- Died: 11 November 1548; Plamo Canal, beside Sabua Canal, Ayutthaya Kingdom
- Spouse: Si Suda Chan
- Dynasty: Uthong

Worawongsathirat (Thai: วรวงศาธิราช, Varavaṅśādhirāja) was a usurper in the Ayutthaya Kingdom, ruling for only 42 days in 1548 before being assassinated. Siamese chronicles relate that Worawongsathirat attainted the crown — his kingship is not accepted by most traditional historians.

His birth name was Bunsi (Thai: บุญศรี). Upon entering service to the crown as keeper of the Royal Pantheon (หอพระเทพบิดร), a cloister on the palace grounds (with duties such as organising various rites and ceremonies,) Bunsi was styled Phan Butsithep (พันบุตรศรีเทพ). He was later promoted to the rank of Khun and styled Khun Chinnarat (ขุนชินราช); this was perhaps while he was having an adulterous affair with Si Sudachan (Thai: ศรีสุดาจันทร์), a first-class concubine of King Chairachathirat. (Si Sudachan was a title rather than her personal name, as one of the four first-class concubines, namely Inthrasuren, Si Sudachan, Inthrathewi and Si Chulalak. Her personal name is not recorded in the historical sources.

King Chairachathirat died in 1546, possibly poisoned by Si Sudachan's hand. Their young son, Prince Yotfa, ascended the throne as King Yotfa with his mother as regent. (Whether Si Sudachan and Khun Chinnarat had their affair before or after the ascension of Yotfa is subject to debate. Jeremias van Vliet's memories state that they met after the coronation of Yotfa which contrasts to those of Fernão Mendes Pinto.)

In 1548, King Yotfa was killed and Si Sudachan, still acting as a regent, put Khun Chinnarat on the throne styled "Khun Worawongsathirat". Traditional historians criticise this usurpation as a great violation of morality. Some modern historians, however, take an alternative view. In this interpretation, both Si Sudachan and Worawongsathirat, being of the deposed Lawo-Ayothaya clan, intended to restore it to the Ayutthayan throne. Thus Worawongsathirat's reign could be called a restoration of the Lawo-Ayothaya clan to Ayutthayan authority, at the expense of the Suphannaphum clan and other noble clans.

Those of the Suphannaphum clan responded by forming alliances with the Sukhothai clan led by Khun Phirenthorathep and Si Thammasok, and of the Nakhon Si Thammarat clan led by Khun Intharathep. Their plot to overthrow Worawongsathirat involved the discovery of a white elephant (pachyderm) in Lop Buri in 1548. White elephants are considered sacred and symbols of royal power; all those discovered are normally presented to the king. The king was told that mahouts were unable to tame the elephant, so the king was invited to go tame it himself. On setting out by royal barge along Plamo Canal (Thai: คลองปลาหมอ), beside Sabua Canal (Thai: คลองสระบัว) (historian Jeremias van Vliet says it was on the side nearer the Palace Gate), Worawongsathirat was killed by gunshot. His head and that of his paramour were then displayed on spikes, and their bodies left to vultures.

Those executing the coup, Khun Phirenthorathep and his fellow retired officers gave the throne to Prince Thienracha, who was proclaimed King Mahachakkraphat, meaning "Great Emperor".

== See also ==
- List of Thai monarchs

Worawongsathirat Uthong Dynasty Born: ? Died: 1548
Regnal titles
Preceded by Yotfa	King of Ayutthaya (disputed); 1548	Succeeded by Maha Chakkraphat
