= Kamin Kamani =

Thai writer

Kamin Kamani คามิน คมนีย์
- Born: Nakhon Si Thammarat, Thailand
- Education: Cornell University
- Occupation: Writer
- Writing career
- Language: Thai, English
- Website: kaminbooks.wordpress.com

Kamin Kamani (Thai: คามิน คมนีย์; RTGS: Khamin Khamani) is a Thai writer. He was a two-time winner of Naiin Literature Award for Best Nonfiction in 2004 and 2009. He also won the 2011 Wankaew Award for Young Adult Fiction and the 2013 National Book Award for Best Young People's fiction. In 2014, the International Board on Books for Young People (IBBY) included his book, Lookyang Klang Huay, on its Honour Book List.

== Works ==
1. The Sunday Morning Club (เย็นวันเสาร์-เช้าวันอาทิตย์)
2. The Other Side of the Sky (ใต้ฟ้าฟากกระโน้น)
3. Kick it, Don't Let it Die (ช่วยกันเตะ... อย่าให้ตาย!)
4. Dancing with the Circle (ลอยนวล)
5. The Prince in the Enemy's Land (ไปเป็นเจ้าชาย... ในแคว้นศัตรู)
6. Finding Jotun (ตามหาโจตัน)
7. The Prince in Mandalay (ตะลอนพม่าประสาเจ้าชาย)
8. Condo-Doggie (สุ(ข)นัขคอนโด)
9. Dancing on a Thin Line (โลดเต้นบนเส้นด้าย)
10. Lookyang Klang Huay – The Creekside Boy (ลูกยางกลางห้วย)
11. The Time Shrink in Myanmar (เหมือนเวลาไม่เคยเปลี่ยน)
12. Coffee Time Inspiration (ใจเท่านั้นบันดาลแรง)
13. The Awakening of Mom (เมื่อแม่ตื่น)
14. Head, Heart & Feet (หัว*ใจ*เท้า)

== Awards ==
- Naiin Literature Award for Best Nonfiction (Twice, 2004 and 2009)
- Wankaew Award, Best Fiction for Young Adults (2011)
- National Book Award, Best Fiction for Young People (2013)
