= Borommarachathirat IV =

King of Ayutthaya from 1529 to 1533

Borommarachathirat IV บรมราชาธิราชที่ ๔

King of Ayutthaya
- Reign: July/October 1529 – 1533
- Predecessor: Chetthathirat
- Successor: Ratsadathirat
- Born: Athittayawong; 1488
- Died: 1533 (aged 44–45)
- Issue: Ratsadathirat
Names
- Borommarachathirat
Regnal name
- Somdet Phra Borommarachathirat
- Dynasty: Suphannaphum
- Father: Ramathibodi II
- Religion: Buddhism

Borommarachathirat IV (Thai: บรมราชาธิราชที่ ๔; also spelt Borom Rachathirat IV), also known as Borommaracha No Phutthangkun (Thai: บรมราชาหน่อพุทธางกูร; also spelt Borom Racha No Buddhakura), born Athittayawong (Thai: อาทิตยวงศ์), was the king of Ayutthaya, an ancient kingdom in Siam, from 1529 to 1533.

== Life and reign ==
Borommarachathirat was born Prince Athittayawong to Ramathibodi II in 1488. He was named uparaja (heir presumptive and viceroy) at Phitsanulok in 1515.

Following his father's death, Athittayawong succeeded the throne as Borommarachathirat IV. He appointed his brother, Prince Chairachathirat, as uparaja. Borommarachathirat died abruptly in 1533 due to a smallpox epidemic; however, contrary to the tradition established by the Front Palace system, the throne passed not to the uparaja but to Borommarachathirat's five-year-old son, who would rule as Ratsadathirat.

Borommarachathirat IV House of Suphannaphum Born: 1488 Died: 1533
Regnal titles
Preceded by Ramathibodi II	King of Ayutthaya; 1529–1533	Succeeded by Ratsadathirat
Vacant Title last held by Chettathirat	Viceroy of Ayutthaya; 1515–1529	Succeeded by Chairachathirat
Preceded by Chettathirat	Ruler of Phitsanulok; 1491–1529	Succeeded by Chairachathirat
