= Nakhon Si Thammarat =

City in Nakhon Si Thammarat Province, Thailand

Nakhon Si Thammarat นครศรีธรรมราช
- Municipality
- Nakhon Si Thammarat City Municipality เทศบาลนครนครศรีธรรมราช
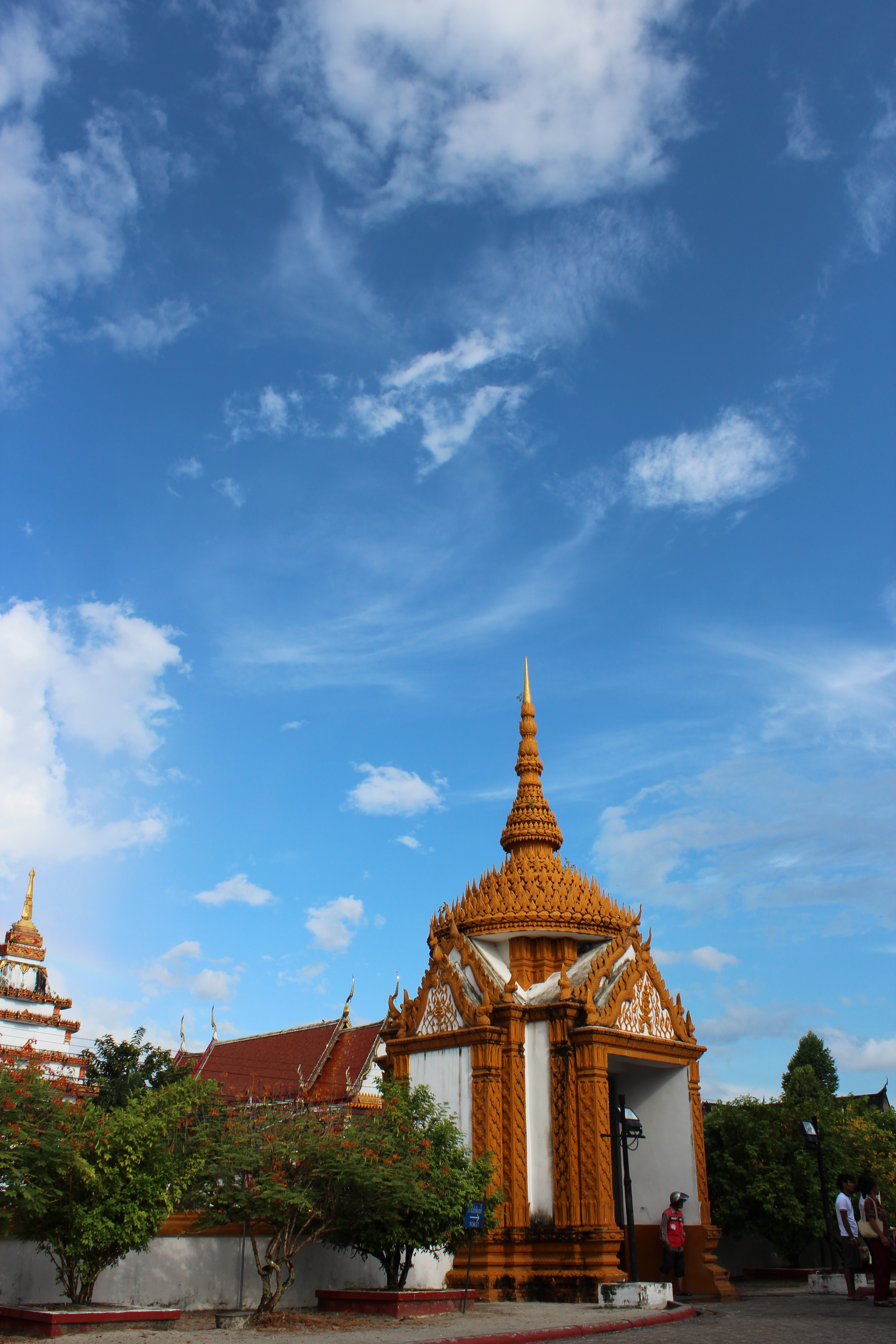
- Nakhon Si Thammarat

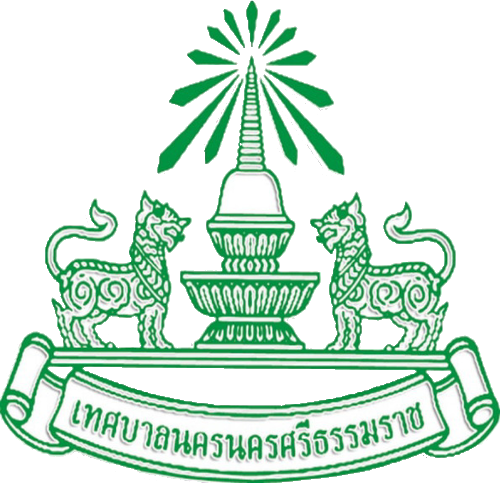
- Seal

- Location in Thailand
- Coordinates: 8°26′11″N 99°57′47″E
- Country: Thailand
- Province: Nakhon Si Thammarat
- District: Mueang Nakhon Si Thammarat
- Sanitation: 5 Sep 1913
- Municipality: 11 Dec 1935
- Municipality: 25 Aug 1994

Government
  - Type: City Municipality
  - Mayor: Dr. Kanop Ketchart (2021-present)

Area
  - Total: 22.56 km^{2} (8.71 sq mi)
  - Rank: 19th
- Elevation: 9 m (30 ft)

Population (2019)
  - Total: 102,152
  - Rank: 12th
  - Density: 4,528/km^{2} (11,730/sq mi)
- Registered residents
- Time zone: UTC+7 (ICT)
- Postcode: 80000
- Calling ode: 075
- Website: www.nakhoncity.org

Nakhon Si Thammarat (Thai: นครศรีธรรมราช, pronounced [ná(ʔ).kʰɔ̄ːn sǐː tʰām.má.râːt]; from Sanskrit: "Nagara Shrī Dharmarāja") is a city municipality (thesaban nakhon) in Mueang Nakhon Si Thammarat district, the capital of Nakhon Si Thammarat province, in the south of Thailand. It is about 610 km (380 mi) south of Bangkok, on the east coast of the Malay Peninsula. The city was the administrative centre of Southern Thailand during most of its history. Originally, a coastal city, silting moved the coastline away from the city. The city has a much larger north to south extension than west to east, which dates back to its original location on a flood-safe dune. The modern city centre on the train station is north of Old Town. As of 2019, the city had a population of 102,152.

== Toponymy ==
Thai honorific Sri or Si from Sanskrit Shri; Thamma, from Dharma; rat, from Raja. Dharmarāja means "righteous ruler", an important Theravada concept.

== History ==
Nakhon Si Thammarat is one of the oldest cities in Thailand with a rich history. The earliest settlement in the vicinity of the city was Tha Rua, about ten kilometers south of the modern city, where ceramics from the Song dynasty were found dated to the twelfth century. The settlement then moved to Muang Phra Wieng, which was associated with the Tambralinga Kingdom, four kilometers to the south. An inscription was found at Wat Sema Muang that bore: The king of Srivijaya "had established a foothold on the Malay Peninsula at Ligor" by 775, where he "built various edifices, including a sanctuary dedicated to the Buddha and to the Bodhisattvas Padmapani and Vajrapani." Tambralinga, whose name means "Red Linga" (from Sanskrit tām(b)ra "copper" and lingam) and may relate to Chinese Tan Ma Ling (單馬令), was one of the polities under Mahayanist Srivijaya thalassocracy.

The Chronicles of Nakorn Si Thammarat, composed in the seventeenth century, attributed the foundation of current city of Nakhon Si Thammarat to King Sri Thammasok in the thirteenth century. An inscription found at Chaiya stated that King Sri Thammasok ruled Tambralinga in 1231. King Sri Thammasok constructed Wat Phra Mahathat and introduced Singhalese Theravada Buddhism. The Nakhon Si Thammarat Kingdom held authorities over "twelve cities" that extended from Chumphon to the north and Pahang to the south. The Ramkamhaeng Stele of Sukhothai first mentioned "Nakhon Si Thammarat" in 1292, which means "The City of King Sri Thammasok" or "The City of the Virtuous king". The Nakhon Si Thammarat kingdom ended and the city perished in the fourteenth century. The ruler of Phetchaburi known as Phra Phanom Thale sent his son Phra Phanom Wang to re-establish the city and rule. Nakhon Si Thammarat then came under the influence of Central Siamese Kingdom of Ayutthaya under the mandala system.

Nakhon Si Thammarat was further incorporated into Ayutthaya, who appointed governors to the city, through centralization under King Trailokanat in the fifteenth century. Nakhon Si Thammarat served as the main seat of Siamese authority over Southern Thailand and the Malay Peninsula, becoming Muang Ek or first-level city. Nakhon Si Thammarat was known in Western sources as "Ligor". Yamada Nagamasa, the Japanese adventurer, was appointed as the governor of Ligor in 1629. In the 1680s, during the reign of King Narai, M. de Lamare the French architect renovated the city walls. After the Siamese revolution of 1688, the governor of Ligor rebelled against the new King Phetracha. King Phetracha sent troops to put down rebels in Ligor in 1692. The powers of the governors of Ligor was then curbed and Ligor was put under the authority of Samuha Kalahom the Prime Minister of Southern Siam.

After the Fall of Ayutthaya in 1767, Phra Palat Nu the vice-governor of Ligor established himself as the local warlord and ruler over Southern Thailand. King Taksin of Thonburi marched south to subjugate Phra Palat Nu or Chao Phraya Nakhon Nu in 1769. Chao Phraya Nakhon Nu was taken to Thonburi but King Taksin re-installed Nakhon Nu as a tributary ruler of Ligor in 1776. King Rama I re-established the governorship of Ligor in 1784 and it ceded to be a tributary kingdom. During the Burmese-Siamese War in 1786, the city of Ligor was sacked by the invading Burmese. During the tenure of Chao Phraya Nakhon Noi (1811–1838), known in British sources as the "Raja of Ligor", Ligor retained a relative autonomy and emerged as the political and cultural center of Southern Siam. Sir John Bowring mentioned in 1857 that the city of Ligor had a population of 12,000 people, perhaps the largest city in southern Siam before being surpassed by Surat Thani and Hatyai in modern times.

After Nakhon Noi, his son and grandson became respective governors of Nakhon Si Thammarat. During the reforms of King Chulalongkorn, the traditional governorship of Ligor was abolished and the city was incorporated into the Monthon Nakhon Si Thammarat 1896. When the monthon system was abolished in 1932, the town became a provincial capital.

== Climate ==
Nakhon Si Thammarat has a tropical rainforest climate (Köppen climate classification Af). The city is more subject to the Intertropical Convergence Zone than the trade winds but experiences a few cyclones so is not purely equatorial but subequatorial. Temperatures remain very warm to hot throughout the year. While some rain falls in all months, it is drier in February and March when about 90 millimetres (3.5 in) of rain falls in each month, and wetter in October to December when very heavy rain may fall; November sees 631 millimetres (24.8 in) of rain on average each year.

Climate data for Nakhon Si Thammarat (1991–2020, extremes 1951-present)
Month	Jan	Feb	Mar	Apr	May	Jun	Jul	Aug	Sep	Oct	Nov	Dec	Year
Record high °C (°F)	34.4 (93.9)	35.5 (95.9)	38.0 (100.4)	38.9 (102.0)	39.7 (103.5)	37.8 (100.0)	38.5 (101.3)	37.6 (99.7)	37.7 (99.9)	36.5 (97.7)	35.4 (95.7)	32.7 (90.9)	39.7 (103.5)
Mean daily maximum °C (°F)	30.5 (86.9)	31.6 (88.9)	32.9 (91.2)	34.0 (93.2)	34.3 (93.7)	34.1 (93.4)	33.8 (92.8)	33.8 (92.8)	33.2 (91.8)	31.9 (89.4)	30.4 (86.7)	29.9 (85.8)	32.5 (90.6)
Daily mean °C (°F)	26.1 (79.0)	26.6 (79.9)	27.5 (81.5)	28.4 (83.1)	28.4 (83.1)	28.3 (82.9)	28.0 (82.4)	27.9 (82.2)	27.4 (81.3)	26.8 (80.2)	26.3 (79.3)	25.9 (78.6)	27.3 (81.1)
Mean daily minimum °C (°F)	22.3 (72.1)	22.1 (71.8)	22.7 (72.9)	23.6 (74.5)	24.1 (75.4)	24.0 (75.2)	23.8 (74.8)	23.6 (74.5)	23.4 (74.1)	23.2 (73.8)	23.0 (73.4)	22.6 (72.7)	23.2 (73.8)
Record low °C (°F)	17.2 (63.0)	15.5 (59.9)	18.3 (64.9)	20.2 (68.4)	21.1 (70.0)	19.6 (67.3)	20.1 (68.2)	20.8 (69.4)	20.0 (68.0)	20.6 (69.1)	18.0 (64.4)	17.1 (62.8)	15.5 (59.9)
Average precipitation mm (inches)	262.3 (10.33)	77.0 (3.03)	138.8 (5.46)	107.0 (4.21)	159.9 (6.30)	120.4 (4.74)	117.2 (4.61)	135.0 (5.31)	155.7 (6.13)	285.7 (11.25)	637.5 (25.10)	511.1 (20.12)	2,707.6 (106.59)
Average precipitation days (≥ 1.0 mm)	11.1	4.4	6.0	6.8	12.2	10.1	10.7	12.2	13.7	17.3	19.7	16.7	140.9
Average relative humidity (%)	84.0	80.8	80.1	79.8	80.7	79.3	78.9	79.0	82.0	85.6	87.5	86.2	82.0
Mean monthly sunshine hours	179.8	180.8	201.5	183.0	155.0	150.0	155.0	114.7	108.0	108.5	105.0	142.6	1,783.9
Mean daily sunshine hours	5.8	6.4	6.5	6.1	5.0	5.0	5.0	3.7	3.6	3.5	3.5	4.6	4.9
Source 1: World Meteorological Organization
Source 2: Office of Water Management and Hydrology, Royal Irrigation Department (sun 1981–2010)(extremes)

== Administration ==
Subdistrict	Comm.	People	Househ.
Nai Mueang	20	42,398	18,832
Pho Sadet	18	24,664	11,052
Khlang	11	17,040	8,226
Tha Wang	13	16,854	7,563
Nakian	1	1,196	472

Nakhon Si Thammarat was established as a sanitation (sukhaphiban) on 5 September 1913, with an area of 3.0 km^{2}. The sanitation changed to town municipality (thesaban mueang) on 11 December 1935. The municipality was increased to 11.72 km^{2}. on 10 November 1965, and up to 22.56 km^{2}. on 10 December 1993. The status was upgraded to city municipality (thesaban nakhon) on 25 August 1994. The administration consists of five subdistricts, 63 communities, 102,152 people in 46,145 households.

== Points of interest ==
=== Wat Phra Mahathat ===
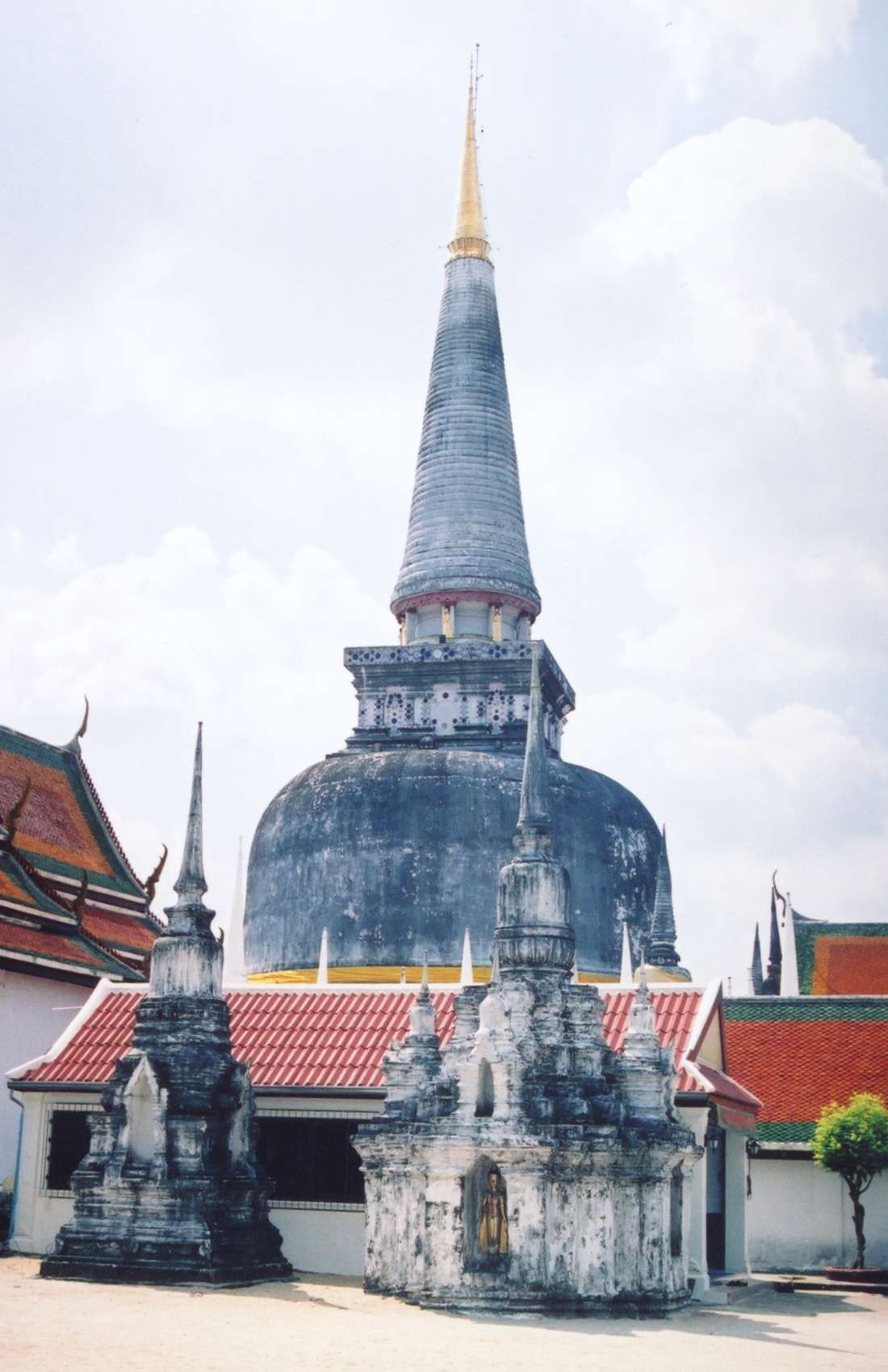
Chedi Phra Baromathat, constructed by King Sri Thammasok of Nakhon Si Thammarat Kingdom in the thirteenth century.

Wat Phra Mahathat Vihaan (Thai วัดพระมหาธาตุวรมหาวิหาร) is the most important temple of Nakhon Si Thammarat and southern Thailand. It was constructed at the time of the founding of the town, and contains a tooth relic of Buddha. The 78 m high chedi is surrounded by 173 smaller ones. While the chedi is now in Sri Lankan style, it is said to be built on top of an earlier Srivijaya style chedi. The chedi was renovated in early 2009 and now appears like new.

At the base of the chedi is a gallery named Viharn Tap Kaset, decorated with many Buddha statues and elephant heads emerging from the chedi. Viharn Phra Song Ma are the buildings which contain the staircase which leads to a walkway around the chedi above the gallery. At the bottom of the staircase are demon giants (yak) as guardians. Adjoining to the north is the Viharn Kien, which contains a small temple museum.

South of the chedi is the large ubosot building, the Viharn Luang. Monk living quarters are across the street in a separate temple, Wat Na Phra Boromathat.

The chedi is the symbol of the Nakhon Si Thammarat Province, present on the seal of the province. It is also displayed on the 25 satang coin.

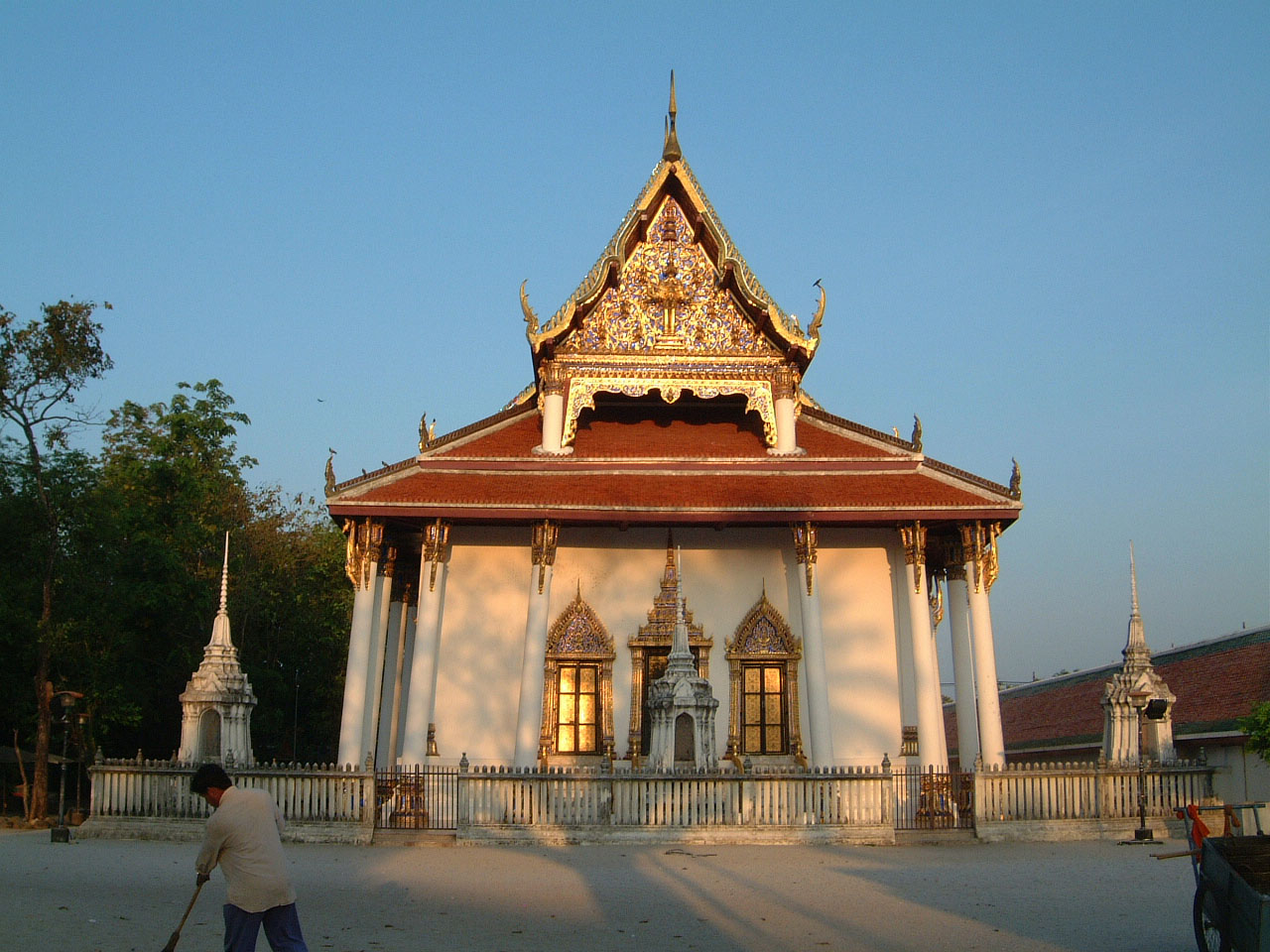
Temple in Si Thammarat

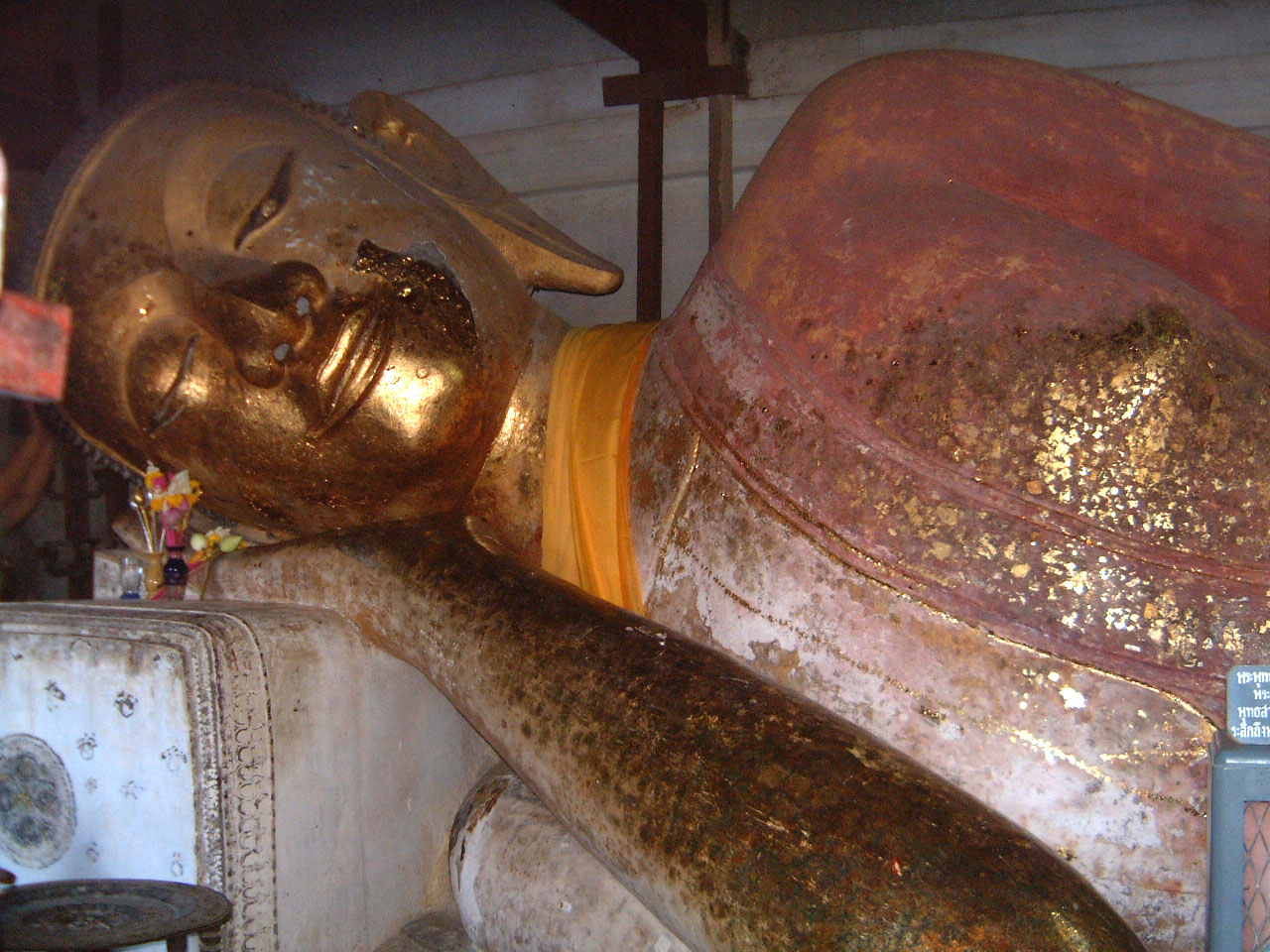
Reclining Buddha statue in Si Thammarat

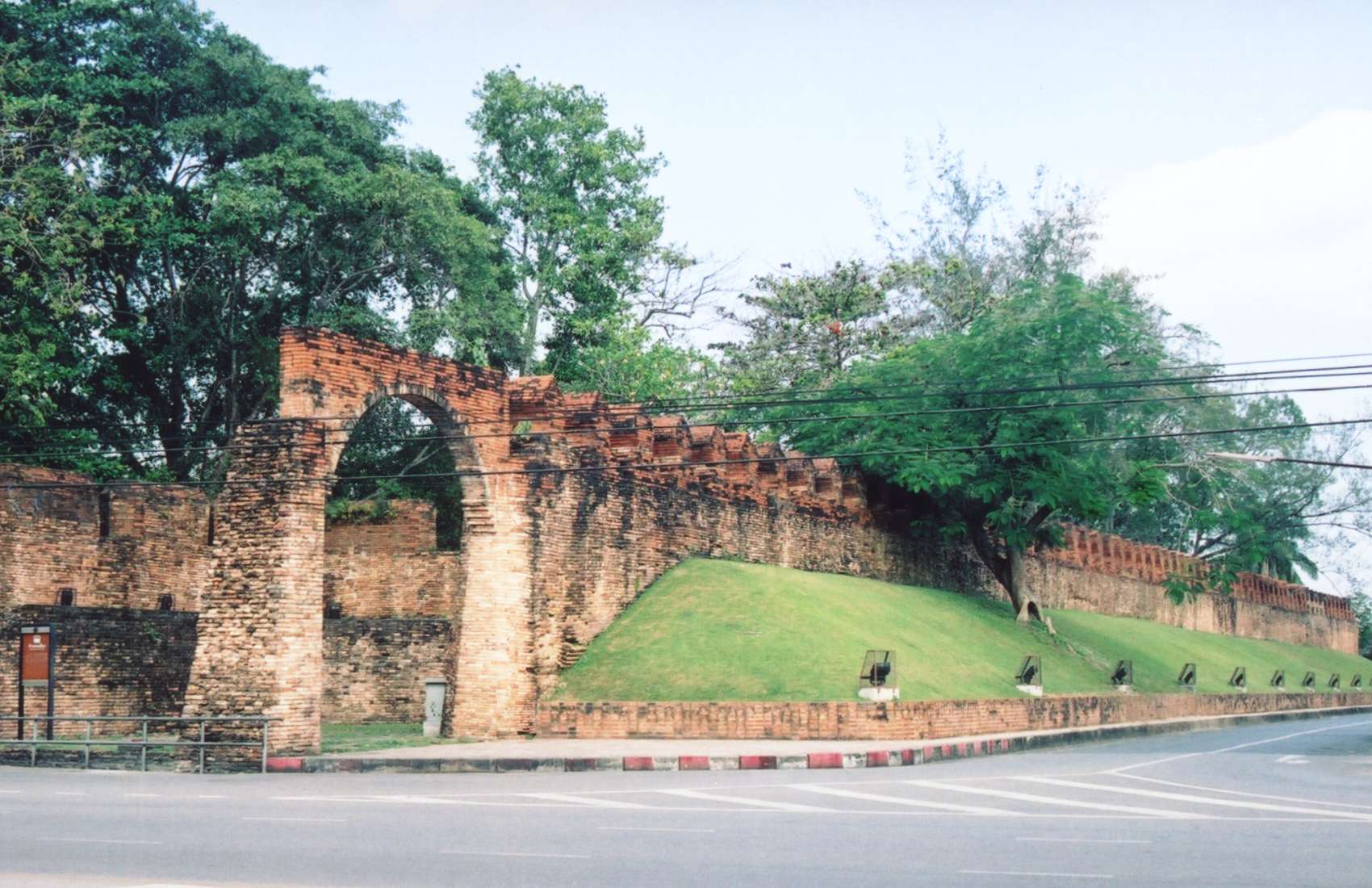
Northern Gate; renovated by M. de Lamare the French architect in the 1680s.

=== City wall ===
The city chronicle mentions a fortification when the town was refounded in 1278. Restorations were recorded at the time of King Ramesuan (14th century), as well as King Narai (1686). The latter was supported by the French engineer M. de la Mare.

The walls spread 456 m from east to west, and 2238 m north to south, thus enclosing an area of about one square kilometre. The northern wall had only one gate, called Prathu Chai Nua or Prathu Chai Sak. The southern wall had only one gate. To the east there were three gates, which connected the town with the sea. To the west were five gates. Today only the northern gate still exists, together with a short stretch of the northern city wall.

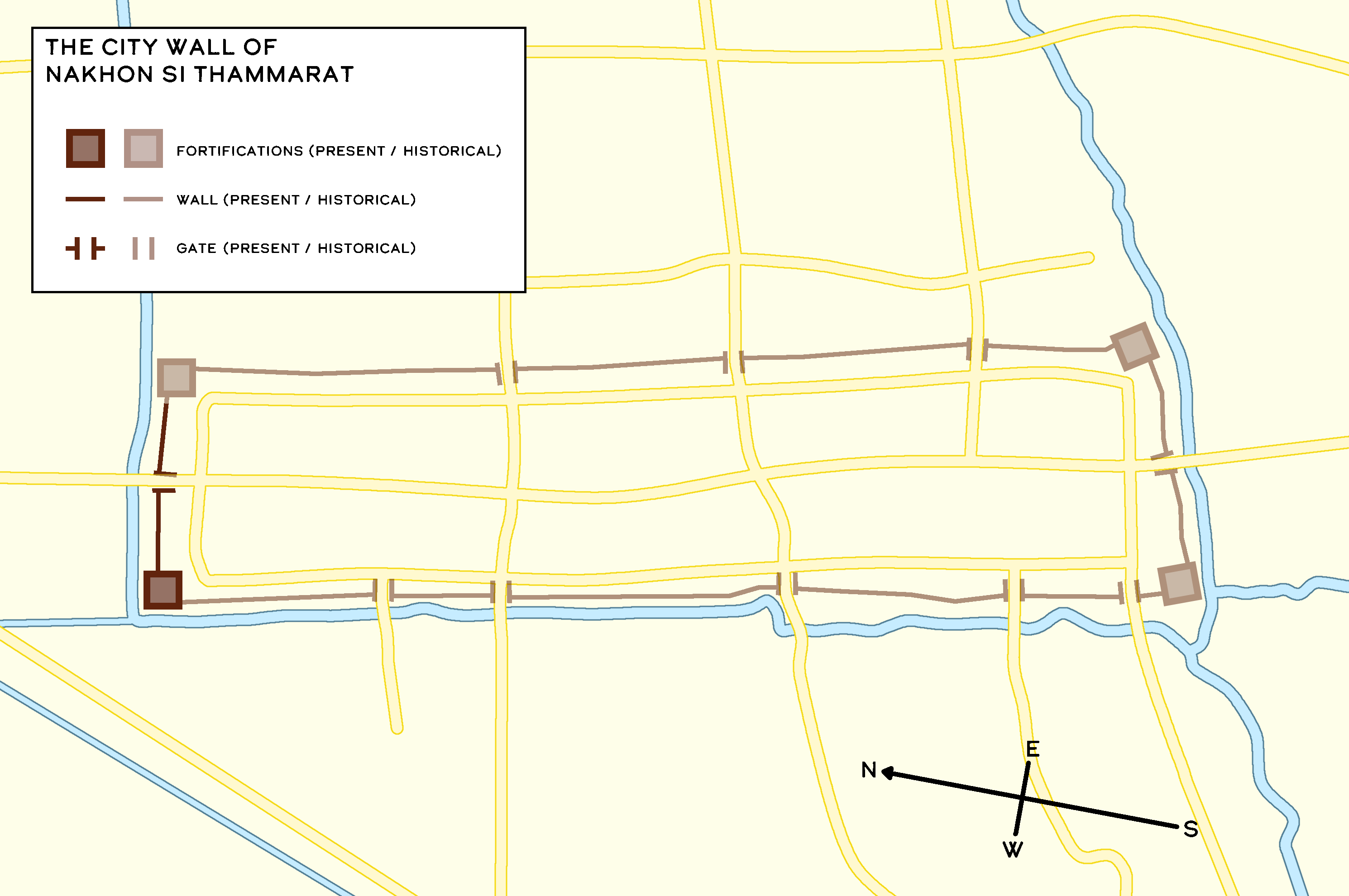
The Wall of the City of Nakhon Si Thammarat

== Education ==
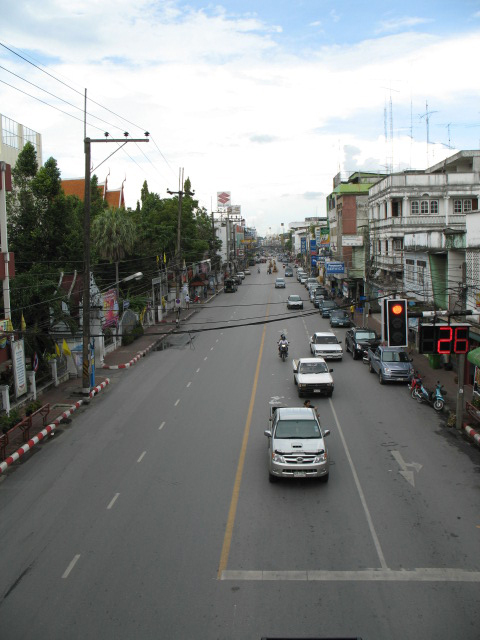
Ratchadamnoen St, Nakhon Si Thammarat downtown

Nakhon Si Thammarat has two universities: Walailak University (the largest university in Thailand) and Nakhon Si Thammarat Rajaphat University.

Vocational Colleges in the city include:

- Nakhon Si Thammarat has numerous vocational colleges
- Nakhon Si Thammaratt Technical College (Technic)
- Nakhon Si Thammarat Vocational college (Acheewa)

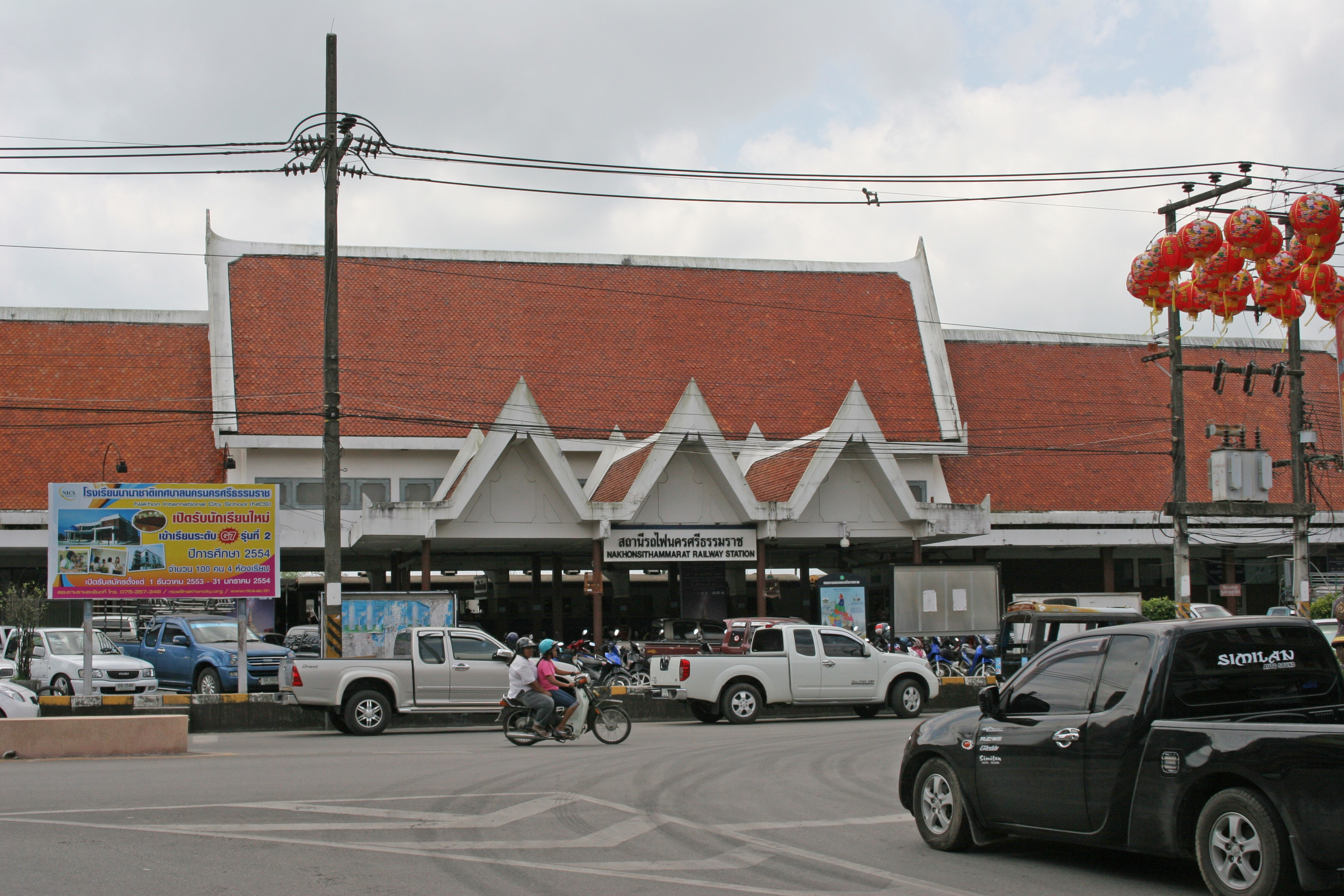
Nakhon Si Thammarat Railway Station

While secondary schools in Nakhon Si Thammarat includes three large schools: Benjamarachutit School and Kanlayanee Si Thammarat School, both public secondary schools serving grades 7 to 12, and Sithammarat Suksa School, the largest private pre-kindergarten that serves students through grade 12.

Sithammarat Suksa School is the largest kindergarten and primary school which offers nursery-grade 6 classes on all three campuses in the city. They also offer the largest English program housed on a separate campus. Sithammart Suksa is often referred to as "Sirat" "AMC" or "EP AMC".

Several kindergarten and primary schools in the area include: Anuban Na Nakhon Utit School is a government-run school with kindergarten through grade 6. The school operates both Thai and English programmes.

== Culture ==
- Nakhon Si Thammarat National Museum

== Notable people ==
- Kamin Kamani, writer

== Sources ==
- Stuart Munro-Hay. Nakhon Sri Thammarat – The Archaeology, History and Legends of a Southern Thai Town. ISBN 974-7534-73-8
