= Ramathibodi II =

King of Ayutthaya from 1491 to 1529

Ramathibodi II รามาธิบดีที่ ๒

King of Ayutthaya
- Reign: 1491 – July/10 October 1529
- Predecessor: Borommaracha
- Successor: Athittayawong
- Born: 1472/73
- Died: July/10 October 1529 (aged 57)
- Issue: Athittayawong; Chairacha; Thianracha
Names
- Somdet Phra Ramathibodi II
- Dynasty: Suphannaphum
- Father: Trailokanat

Chettathirat (Thai: เชษฐาธิราช, Jeṣṭhādhirāja), also known upon his accession to the Ayutthayan throne as Ramathibodi II (Thai: รามาธิบดีที่ ๒; 1472/73 – either July or 10 October 1529) was King of Sukhothai from 1485 and King of Ayutthaya from 1491 to 1529. His reign was marked by the first Western contact with the Portuguese.

== King of Sukhothai ==
Prince Chettathirat was the youngest of Trailokanat's three sons. His eldest brother, Prince Borommaracha, served as regent of Ayutthaya during their father's campaigns against the Lanna Kingdom. Another brother, Prince Indraracha, died in the Lanna wars.

In 1485, Chettathirat was appointed uparaja, or crown prince, and was concurrently installed as King of Sukhothai—a title traditionally held by the Ayutthayan heir apparent.

When Trailokanat died in 1488, the throne passed not to Chettathirat but to Borommaracha, who ruled as Borommaracha III. After Borommaracha's death in 1491, Chettathirat succeeded him, thereby reunifying the two kingdoms.

== King of Ayutthaya ==
Chettathirat took the reigning name in Ayutthaya as Ramathibodi II.

=== Invasion of Malacca ===
In 1500, Ramathibodi II dispatched Siamese forces to subjugate the Sultanate of Malacca. Although the campaign failed to bring Malacca under Siamese control, Siam succeeded in extracting tribute from the Malacca sultanate as well as from neighboring polities such as Pattani, Pahang, and Kelantan.

In 1511, however, Malacca was conquered by the Portuguese under Afonso de Albuquerque. A Portuguese embassy led by Duarte Fernandes reached Ayutthaya in 1518, becoming the first Europeans to make contact with Siam. Ramathibodi II concluded a treaty granting the Portuguese "complete commercial freedom", along with permission to establish Christian missions and construct churches.

=== War with Lanna ===
In 1513, King Kaew of Lanna launched an invasion into Sukhothai. Ramathibodi II personally led the Siamese forces to repel the Lanna army and subsequently advanced into Lanna territory. In 1515, he sacked Lampang—a common Southeast Asian practice of punitive raiding without long-term occupation. Afterwards, he appointed his son, Prince Athittayawong, as King of Sukhothai.

=== Establishment of the Corvée system ===
In mainland Southeast Asia, political and military strength depended heavily on the control of manpower. In 1518, Ramathibodi II instituted the Siamese corvée system, which would remain in place until its abolition by King Chulalongkorn in 1905.

Siamese commoners—known as phrai (Thai: ไพร่)—were subject to lifelong labour duty to the state. All men aged eighteen were registered for conscription, either for military service (phrai thaan) or for public works (phrai luang). Although often compared to modern conscription, the Siamese corvée system comprised several distinct categories and obligations. The Krom Phra Suratsawadi, a department within the royal bureaucracy, was responsible for overseeing the registration and mobilization of manpower.

== Death ==
Ramathibodi II died in July or 10 October 1529, during which a great Halley's Comet appeared as recorded in the Siamese Chronicles:

...In Chula Sakarat 891, being the Year of the Ox, an aerial sign, like an arrow of the God Indra, was seen in the air from the southwest to the northwest, having the color of white. On Sunday, the 8th day of the waxing moon in the 12th month, Somdet Phra Ramathibodi Chao passed away.

His son, Prince Athittayawong, succeeded to the throne as Borommaracha IV.

== Notes ==
Ramathibodi II House of Suphannaphum Born: 1473 Died: 10 October 1529
Regnal titles
Preceded by Borommarachathirat III	King of Ayutthaya; 1491–1529	Succeeded by Borommarachathirat IV
Vacant Title last held by Ramesuan	Viceroy of Ayutthaya; 1485–1491	Vacant Title next held by Athittayawong
Preceded by Borommatrailokkanat	Ruler of Phitsanulok; 1488–1491	Succeeded by Athittayawong
