= Sisudachan =

Sisudachan ศรีสุดาจันทร์
- Queen consort of Ayutthaya (disputed); Regent of Ayutthaya
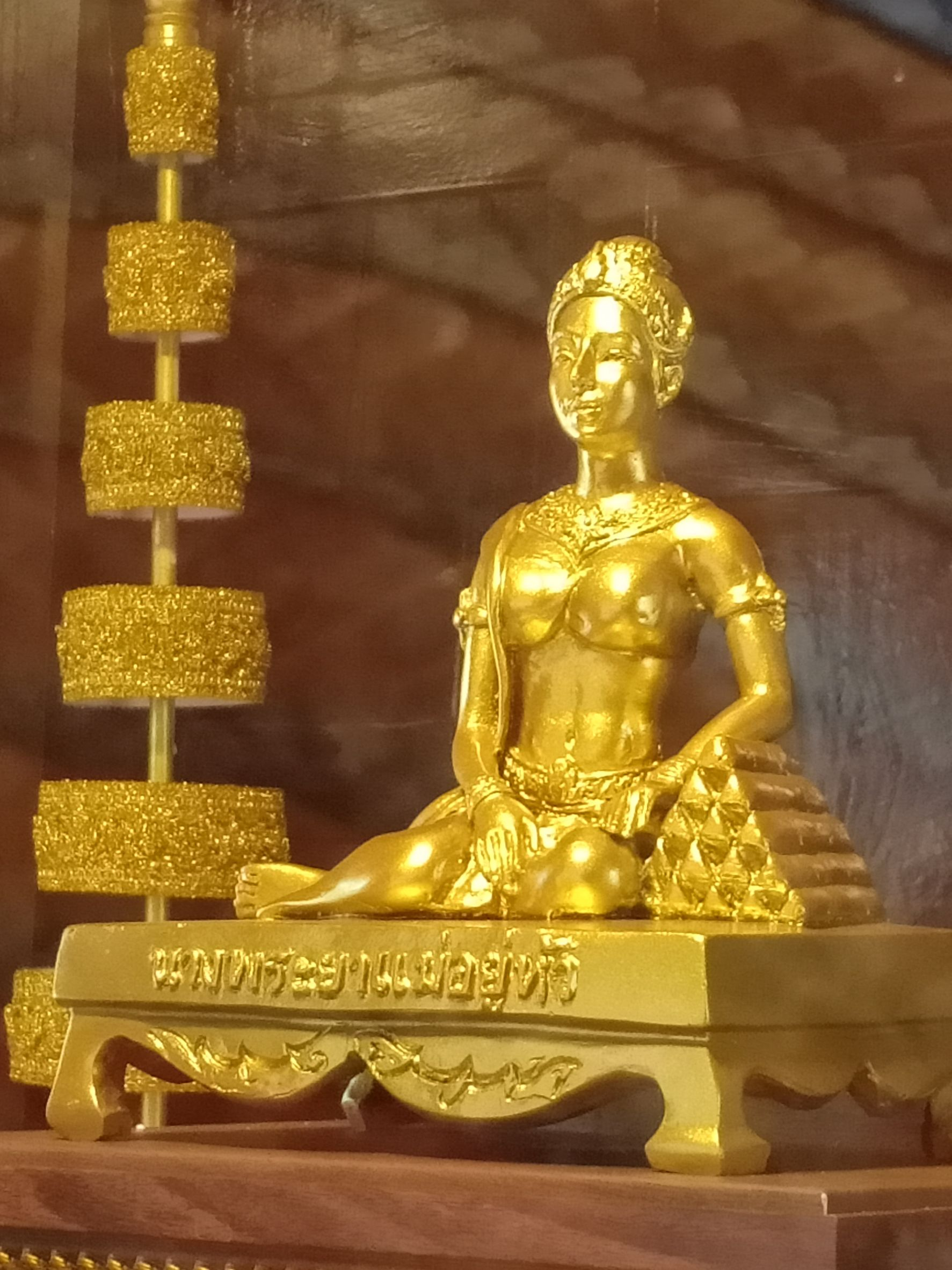
- Statue of Si Suda Chan at Wat Raeng, Phra Nakhon Si Ayutthaya
- Born: –
- Died: 1548; Ayutthaya Kingdom
- Spouse: Chairachathirat (1534–1547); Worawongsathirat (1548)
- Issue: Yotfa; Sisin; Unnamed daughter
- Dynasty: Suphannaphum (by marriage)

Sisudachan (Thai: ศรีสุดาจันทร์; c. early 1500s – 1548), also known by her title Thao Sisudachan (Thai: ท้าวศรีสุดาจันทร์), was the queen consort of King Chairachathirat of the Ayutthaya Kingdom. Following the king's death in 1546, she served as regent for her young son, King Yotfa.

According to the chronicles of that time, she was responsible for the assassination of both sovereigns. Accomplice of the second regicide was her lover Phan Butsithep, whom Sisudachan had appointed first co-regent and then king with the title Khun Worawongsathirat. Opposed by a large part of the court, they were victims of an ambush by the nobles of the Sukhothai clans and were executed just weeks after Worawongsathirat had ascended the throne.

== Biography ==
=== The kingdom Chairacha ===
According to various, often contradictory Siamese sources, King Chairacha had several concubines and minor wives. Among them was Si Sudachan, a princess who is traditionally regarded as a descendant of the Uthong dynasty of Ramathibodi I. She bore him two sons: Prince Yotfa in 1535 and Prince Sisin in 1541. The King was often absent from Ayutthaya, leading military campaigns against the kingdoms of Lan Na, Lan Xang, and the Toungoo dynasty (modern-day Myanmar). Historical accounts suggest that Sisudachan's relationship with a court official and her political ambitions eventually led to the deaths of both Chairacha and Yotfa.

=== Regent ===
In his last months of life, Chairacha had several health problems and died in 1546, shortly after returning to Ayutthaya from an expedition against the Lanna Kingdom. According to the Portuguese adventurer autobiography Fernão Mendes Pinto, who stayed for some time at court, the king was poisoned by Sundachan Lanka, although he does not provide details on how she managed to escape punishment. In its place the eleven year old Yot Fa came to the throne, with his mother Sisudachan and uncle Thianracha, brother of Chairacha and Viceroy with the charge Diuparat. After some time, there were frictions between the two regents and Thianracha preferred to leave the state assignments to enter temporarily to a Buddhist Monastery.

According to the diplomat and storicoolandese Jeremias van Vliet, director of Ayutthaya office in the seventeenth century the Dutch East India Company, Sisudachan met and fell in love with the Brahmin court Phan Sri Thep, but after the coronation of Yot Fa, while according to Pinto they knew each other from before. The regent did give her lover a high office in the palace, she gave him the title Khun Chinnarat and entrusted him with the organization of a large number of the young sovereign protection troops. Khun Chinnarat chose soldiers he trusted and used them to suppress the mandarins who opposed the designs of the pair of lovers power. After clearing the main opponents, Sisudachan demanded that Khun Chinnarat work alongside in his role as regent with the new title of Khun Worawongsathirat.

=== Lover's death and ascension to the throne ===
According to most of the chronicles of the time, the couple was to kill the young King Yot Fa in 1548. The exact causes of death are still shrouded in mystery. According to the version Luang Prasoet of the chronicles of Ayutthaya, Yot Fa was the victim of an accident. According to more recent chronicles was executed at Wat Khok Phraya, infamous in the history of the kingdom as the site where members of the royal family were executed or punished, as had happened to the young king Thong Jan in 1388. Van Vliet claimed that he was poisoned by his mother, while according to Pinto was poisoned by Worawongsathirat.

The throne was given to Worawongsathirat, while his brother, Nai Chan, was given a high government office. Meanwhile, Sisudachan had given birth to a daughter Worawongsa. The reign lasted only a few weeks, a group of nobles of the Sukhothai clan loyalists to the cause of Suphannaphum Dynasty began plotting to murder the couple. After assassinating the couple and their one-month-old daughter, Assicuratisi Thianracha became king, the conspirators Khun Inthorathep, Mün Ratchasaneh and Luang Sri Yot, led by Prince Khun Phiren Thorathep, consulted the oracle citizen and was informed that the kingdom would go to Thianracha.

Sisudachan House of Uthong Born: ? Died: 1548
Thai royalty
| Vacant Title last held by Chittrawadi | Queen Consort of Ayutthaya; 1548 | Succeeded by Suriyothai |
