= Yotfa =

Yotfa ยอดฟ้า
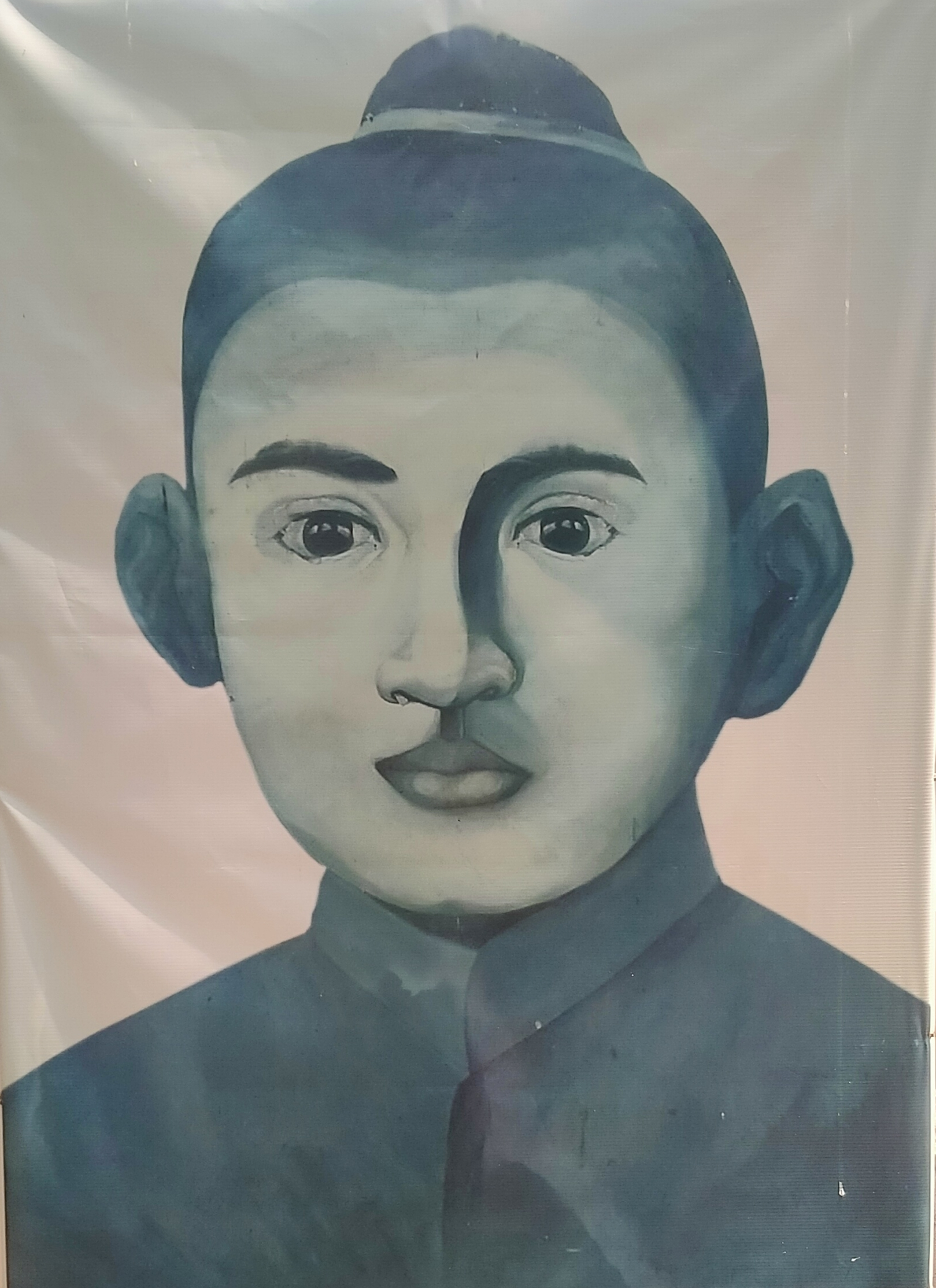

King of Ayutthaya
- Reign: 1546–1548
- Predecessor: Chairachathirat
- Successor: Worawongsathirat
- Born: 1536
- Died: 10 June 1548 (aged 11–12); Khok Phraya Temple (now in Ayutthaya, Ayutthaya Province)
- Dynasty: Suphannaphum
- Father: Chairachathirat
- Mother: Si Suda Chan

Yotfa (Thai: ยอดฟ้า) or Kaeofa (Thai: แก้วฟ้า) was the 14th Ayutthayan king from the Suphannaphum Dynasty (c. 1536 – 10 June 1548)

Yotfa was a son of King Chairachathirat (พระไชยราชาธิราช) and his consort Lady Si Suda Chan (ท้าวศรีสุดาจันทร์). He reigned from 1546 until his murder in 1548.

== Birth ==
Yotfa was born around 1536. He was the son of King Chairachathirat and Lady Si Suda Chan, the Consort of the Left. He had one brother, Prince Sisin (พระศรีศิลป์), who was six years younger than him.

== Reign ==
After King Chairachathirat's death in 1546, Prince Yotfa succeeded to the throne at the age of eleven. His mother, Lady Si Suda Chan, then served as the regent. To avoid political conflicts with Lady Si Suda Chan, Prince Thianracha (พระเฑียรราชา), the most senior member of the royal household, became a monk and stayed at Ratchapraditsathan Temple (วัดราชประดิษฐาน) throughout the reign of Yotfa.

Jeremias van Vliet recorded that Yotfa was fond of riding a horse along the fields, watching elephant duels, learning to use weapons and studying political science, and that his reign saw abundance of agricultural products. However, many Thai chronicles recorded that bad omens occurred shortly after he ascended the throne. When Yotfa presided over an elephant duel, the tusk of Lord of Fire (พระยาไฟ Phraya Fai), a royal elephant, broke into three pieces. At night, another royal elephant, Lord of Six Tusks (พระฉัททันต์ Phra Chatthan, named after a legendary six-tusked elephant), cried like a human being and strange sounds emerged from the Gate of Phaichayon (ประตูไพชยนต์ Pratu Phaichayon), the gate to the Throne Hall of Phaichayon (ไพชยนต์มหาปราสาท Phaichayon Maha Prasat).

During this period, Lady Si Suda Chan committed adultery with a government officer known by his noble title Phan But Si Thep (พันบุตรศรีเทพ). Phan But Si Thep, whose personal name is unknown, was the Keeper of the Outer Chapel. Lady Si Suda Chan later ordered Lord Ratchaphakdi (พระยาราชภักดี Phraya Ratchaphakdi), Minister of Palace Affairs, to promote Phan But Si Thep to Khun Chinnarat (ขุนชินราช), Keeper of the Inner Chapel. Heavily pregnant, Lady Sisudachan found it necessary to enthrone her paramour. In order to place the government officers in awe of Khun Chinnarat, she promoted him to Khun Worawongsathirat (ขุนวรวงศาธิราช), authorised him to take charge of conscription affairs, ordered the construction of his residence next to the Conscription Pavilion (ศาลาสารบัญชี Sala Sarabanchi) near the palace walls, ordered the construction of his office under a white mulberry tree inside the palace, and ordered a royal taboret to be installed in his office for him to sit on. Lord Mahasena (พระยามหาเสนา Phraya Maha Sena), Minister of Defence, complained about the political situation to his fellow ministers. Lady Si Suda Chan then had the minister killed.

== Death ==
Siamese chronicles recorded that in 1548, Lady Si Suda Chan eventually summoned all government officers and told the meeting that Yotfa was too young to rule the kingdom and that "I will place Khun Worawongsathirat in charge of public administration until my son is mature enough". As no one objected, Lady Si Suda Chan ordered the Ministry of Palace Affairs to hold a royal chariot procession to bring Khun Worawongsathirat into the palace and hold his coronation.

After becoming king, Khun Worawongsathirat ordered Yotfa to be killed at Khok Phraya Temple (วัดโคกพระยา) but spared his brother, Prince Sisin. The Astrological Annals recorded that his death was held on Sunday, the fifth day of the waxing moon in the eighth month of the 910th year of the Minor Era, corresponding to 10 June 1548. Yotfa had been on the throne for about two years and was around thirteen years of age when he died.

Si Suda Chan, as well as her paramour and newborn daughter, were later killed in a countercoup staged by senior government officers, led by Khun Phirenthrathep (ขุนพิเรนทรเทพ). The coup makers then offered the throne to Prince Thianracha.

== Notes ==
Yotfa Suphannaphum Dynasty Born: 1536 Died: 1548
Regnal titles
Preceded by Chairachathirat	King of Ayutthaya; 1546–1548	Succeeded by Worawongsathirat
