= Wat Tha Ka Rong =

Buddhist temple in Ayutthaya province, Thailand

- วัดท่าการ้อง
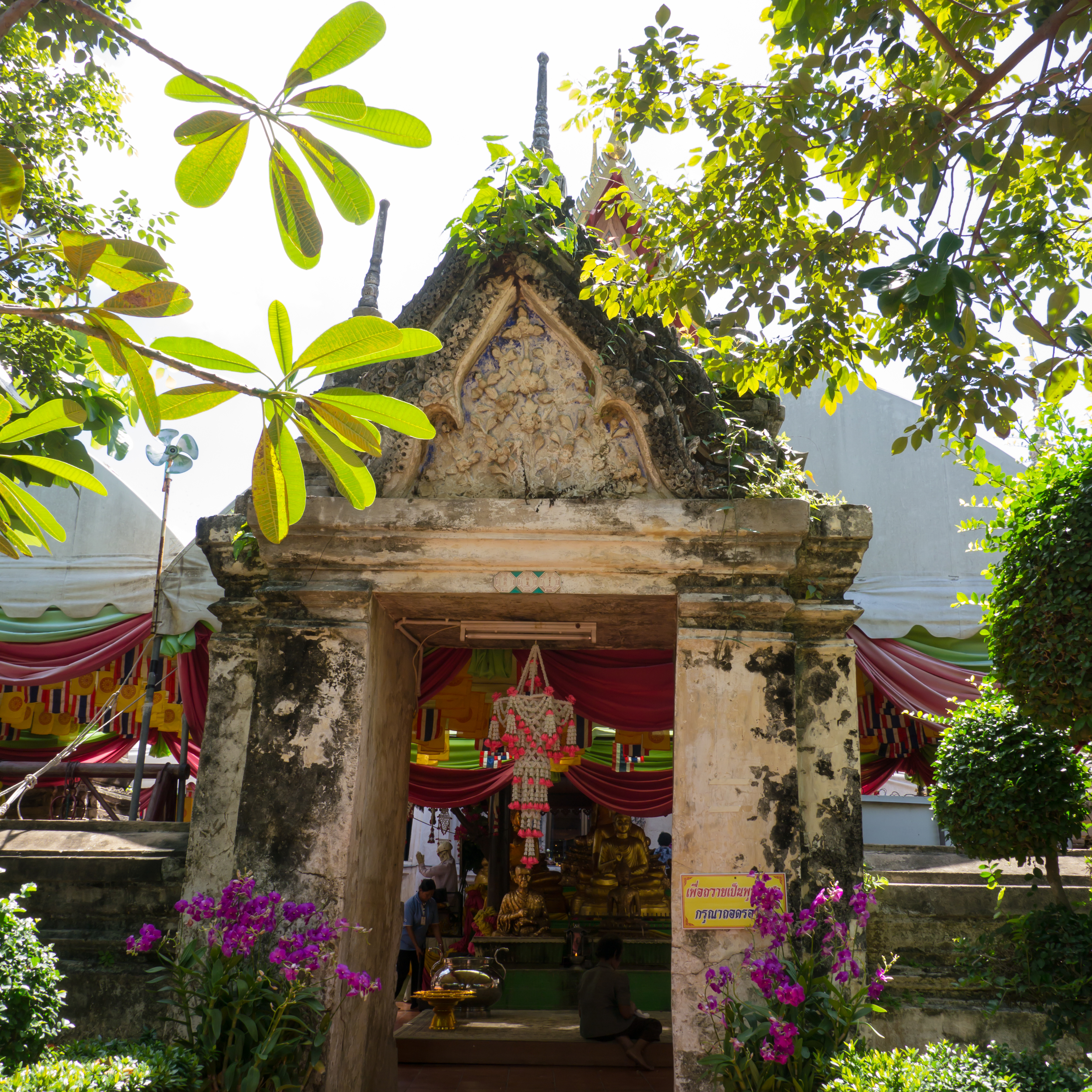

Religion
- Affiliation: Buddhist
- Sect: Theravada
- District: Ayutthaya
- Province: Ayutthaya

Location
- Country: Thailand
- Interactive map of Wat Tha Ka Rong

Wat Tha Ka Rong (crying crow dock temple) was situated on the river bank just north of the confluence of the Bang Kaeo waterway and the old Lopburi River (today the Chao Phraya River after its deviation in the second part of the 19th century) stood in an important strategic position in wartime, as next to an important dockyard, it also controlled the northern water route.

Along the Chao Phraya River are long rafts with stores selling food and other merchandise. On the weekends a modern representation of an old water market attracts the crowd.

== History ==
Wat Tha (dock temple/dock monastery) was located off the city island in the western area of Ayutthaya in the Ban Pom Sub-district. The monastery stood on the south bank of the present Chao Phraya River and near Wat Ka Rong (crying crow temple). Both temple had been merged into present day Wat Tha Ka Rong under King Mongkut's era

Older monastic structures still can be seen at Wat Tha Ka Rong, but they are difficult to discern as the temple site expanded over time to become a Buddhist fancy fair. The octagonal bell tower from brick and plasterwork is said to have been built during the reign of King Narai (1656-1688 CE). The main Buddha image in the ordination hall is Luang Pho Yim, with the formal name Phra Phuttha Rattana Mongkhon. The ordination hall is nowadays hidden under a canopy of banners and neon lights. The whole area surrounding the ubosot is carnivalesque, with many donation-encouraging-mechanisms (even targeting the children). The irrational juxtaposition of pious images of different religions borders surrealism. There are many corners and rooms dedicated to various gods and half-gods.

Depending on which version of the Ayutthaya chronicles is consulted, sources speak about Wat Ka Rong or Wat Tha Ka Rong or the Monastery of the Landing of the Crying Crow Phraya Boran Ratchathanin's map of 1926 CE indicates two monastic structures being Wat Tha (Monastery of the Landing) and Wat Ka Rong (Monastery of the Crying Crow). The two temples were eventually merged to establish the present Wat Tha Ka Rong or the Monastery of the Landing of the Crying Crow.

From the website of the Tourism Authority of Thailand, cited that Wat Tha Ka Rong was mentioned two times in the Royal Chronicles as a fortification for the Burmese troops. The first time would have been during the reign of King Maha Chakkraphat (reign 1548-1569 CE) in 1563 CE during the White Elephant War when King Tabinshwehti and his army encamped at the temple, (author noted: cannot find any trace of that, might simply be an assumption) The Chronicles of Ayutthaya mention the temple's existence for the first time at the fall of Ayutthaya in 1767 CE with the establishment of a stockade and the positioning of large guns at or near the temple's premises.

Nemiao thereupon advanced troops of soldiers forward to establish his main stockade in the Vicinity of the Three Fig Trees, had them raze the recitation hall and preaching hall of the monastery and bring the bricks to build a surrounding wall to form the stockade. Then he conscripted and had all the army masters advance forward to establish stockades at the Monastery of the Gold Mountain, [at] the Village of the Fort and [at] the Monastery of the Crying Crow. He had them erect bastions and build forts so they were tall, take large and small guns up [into them] and fire them on into the Holy Metropolis.

The chronicles also recount the story of the Ayutthaya counter-attack on the Burmese fortification at the Tha Ka Rong monastery. Prince Damrong recites it as follows:

The Siamese saw that the Burmese were approaching the city and establishing a fortification at the Tha Ka Rong monastery as an alignment for big guns to fire into the city. They therefore made the boat force go and attack the Burmese fortification. The boat force that went on this occasion consisted of six groups of volunteers from the army department, but it is not stated who was the commander. It is only said that one Nai Roek, holding swords in both hands, danced at the prow of a boat. The Burmese shot at the boats. Nai Roek was hit and fell into the water. Then all the boats of the boat force returned to the city. To judge from the circumstances narrated, it was certainly due to the belief in the art of charms and incantations. Nai Roek was probably an adept in that art, dancing with his sword, muttering his incantations at the head of the army, having faith in being able to ensure the safety of the entire force. When the adept himself was hit by a gun and died, the people of the force became disheartened and afraid, and the commander of the force thought that if he persisted in the fight, he would only suffer rout and would meet his death with no benefit whatever. Therefore they retreated and returned to the capital.

We can assume that nothing much was left of the monastery after the fall of Ayutthaya and that the temple we see today has been completely reconstructed.

Based on the Temple Registration System of the National Office of Buddhism, Wat Tha was established in 1732 CE in the late Ayutthaya period and received its Wisung Kham Sima in 1742 CE. It is thus an Ayutthaya-era monastery.

The landing near Wat Tha was, in the Ayutthaya era, the home base for the riverine vessels. The riverine vessel dockyard provided shelter for approximately two hundred boats.

In the vicinity of Wat Tha Ka Rong Village, there is a row of thirty boathouses for freshwater war boats. The pillars are of makha wood [Afzelia xylocarpa] and roofs of luk-fuk tiles. Some house ten boats, some six, according to the size of the boat. There are minor officials and royal phrai to look after them each month. If there is a war, two hundred boats can be caulked, hauled out from the dry docks in the boathouses, and used immediately on royal service.
