= Suriyothai =

Queen consort to the King of Ayutthaya

Suriyothai สุริโยทัย
- Queen consort of Ayutthaya
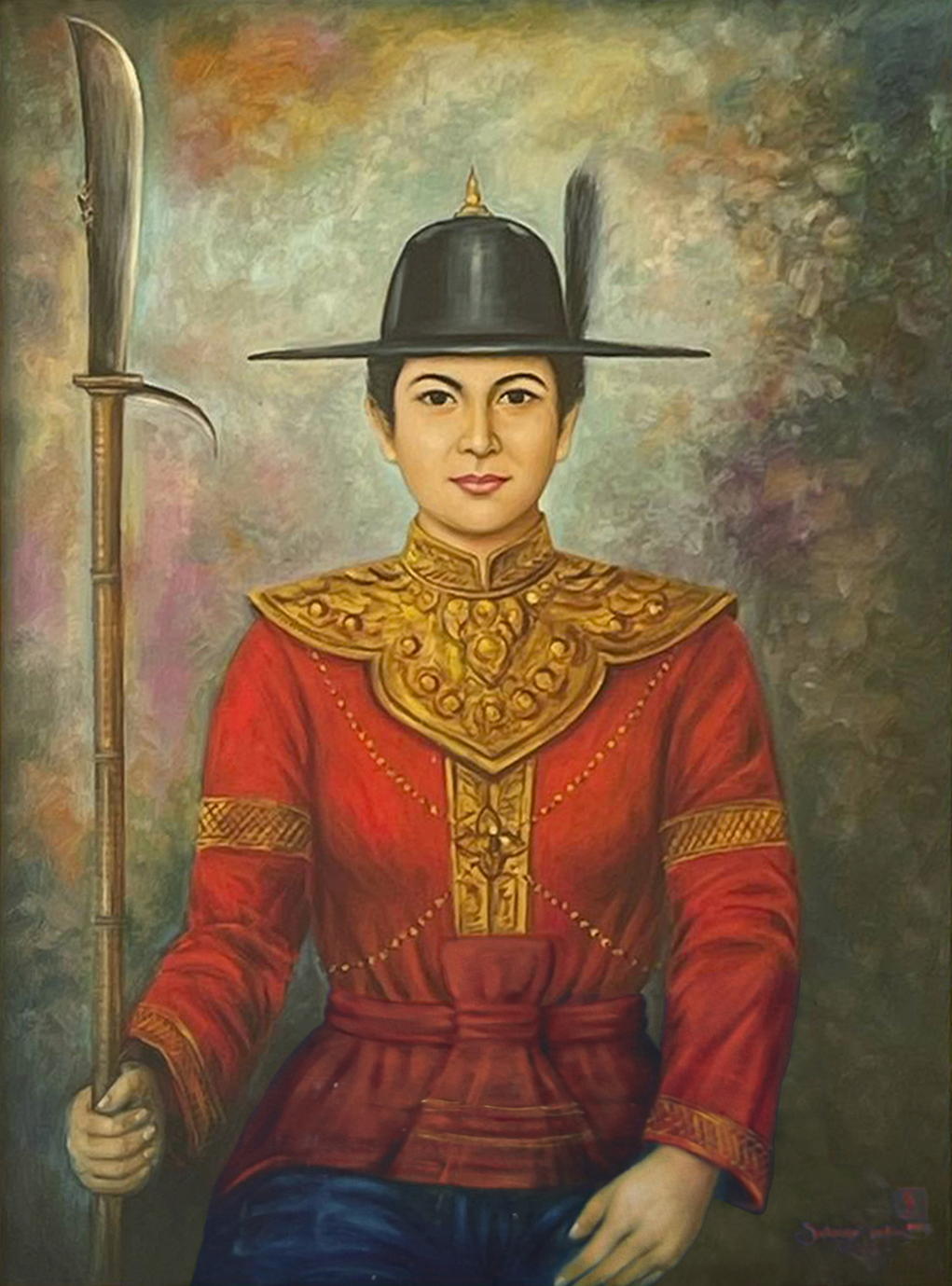
- 20th-century portrait of Suriyothai
- Born: 1511
- Died: December 1548 (aged 36–37)
- Spouse: Maha Chakkraphat
- Issue: Ramesuan; Mahinthrathirat; Wisutkasat; Boromdilok; Thepkasattri
Names
- Suriyothai
- Dynasty: Suphannaphum (by marriage)

Suriyothai (Thai: สุริโยทัย, Thai pronunciation: [sùʔ.ríʔ.jōː.tʰāj], Suriyodaya; Burmese: သူရိယောဒယ) was a queen consort of the Ayutthaya Kingdom during the 16th century. She is famous for sacrificing her life in defense of her husband, King Maha Chakkraphat, during a battle of the Burmese–Siamese War (1547–1549).

== Name and title ==
Somdet Phra (สมเด็จพระ) and Sri (ศรี), pronounced and often transcribed as Si, are her honorifics. Her given name Suriyothai (สุริโยทัย) means "dawn". It is a compound of Suriya, from Sanskrit sūrya (सूर्य, "sun"), and Uthai, from the Sanskrit word udaya (उदय, "rising").

== Life ==
Suriyothai was married to Prince Tien (later to become King Maha Chakkraphat) when he was regent under King Yodfa's rule. Wishing to remain faithful to Suriothai, Prince Tien entered a monastery to avoid the advances of Si Sudachan, the Queen Mother.

Suriyothai was queen during the early part of the reign of King Maha Chakkraphat. In 1548 CE, barely six months into King Maha Chakkraphat's reign, the King of Burma invaded Siam with the intent of sacking the main capital, Ayutthaya.

=== First Burmese invasion ===
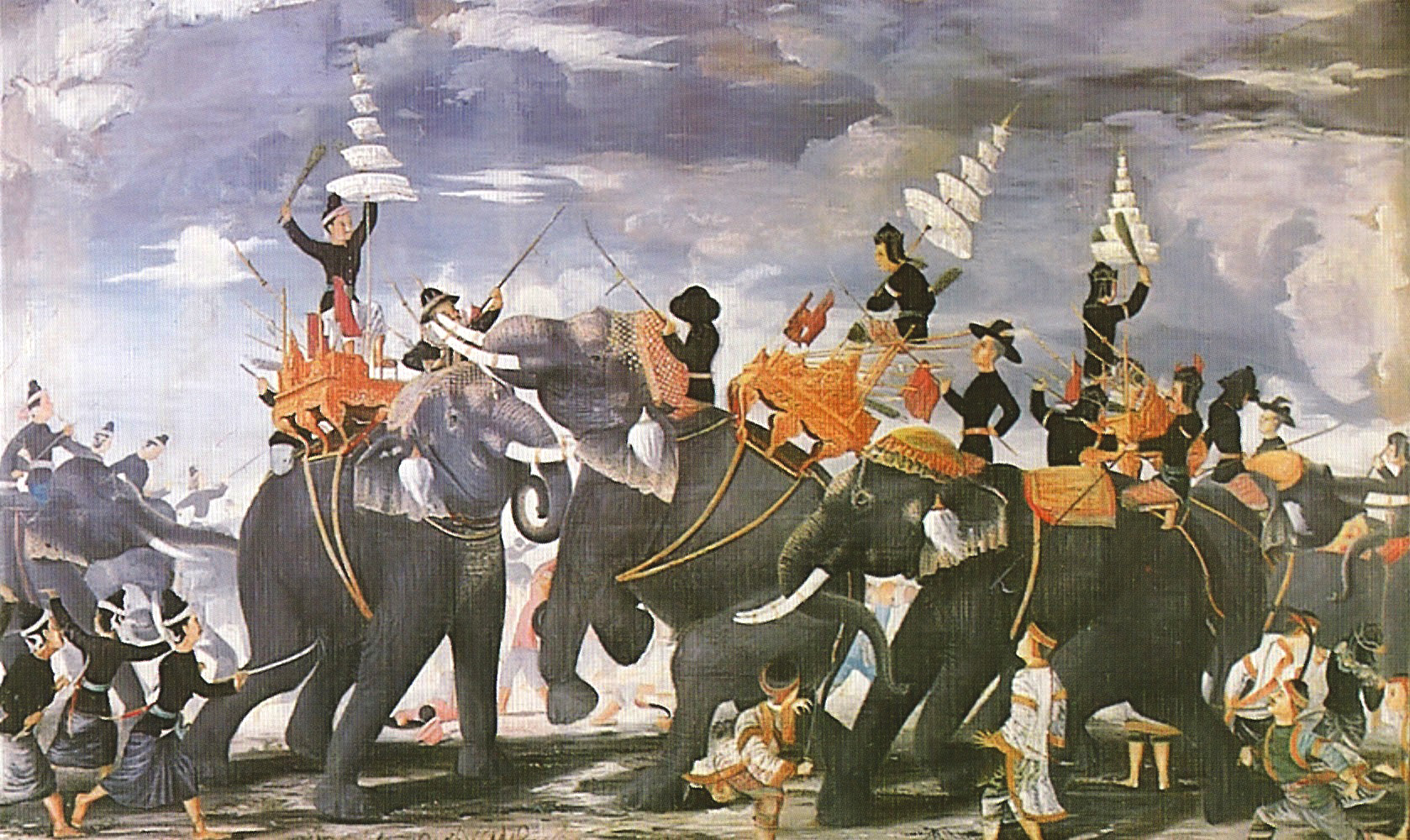
Painting by Prince Narisara Nuvadtivongs, depicting Queen Suriyothai (center) on her elephant putting herself between King Maha Chakkraphat (right) and the Viceroy of Prome (left).

The invasion initially met little resistance, as the Burmese force was too large for the small guard posts on the border. Upon hearing of the Burmese invasion, Maha Chakkraphat mobilized his kingdom, then gathered his forces at Suphanburi, a town just west of Ayutthaya. When Tabinshwehti and his Burmese army arrived at the walled town of Kanchanaburi, they found it deserted. The King of Burma then continued his march eastward, capturing the villages of Ban Thuan, Kaphan Tru and Chorakhe Sam Phan. Tabinshwehti divided his army into three columns, the first commanded by Bayinnaung, the second by the Viceroy of Prome, and the third by Yong, the Governor of Bassein. The Burmese continued their advance and captured the ancient town of Uthong as well as the villages of Don Rakhang and Nong Sarai and closed on Suphanburi. When the Burmese attacked the town, the Siamese defenders could not withstand the onslaught and retreated towards Ayutthaya. Tabinshwehti ordered his army southeast along two canals, and crossed the Chao Phraya River near Phong Phaeng. From here he encamped his army directly north of the Siamese capital of Ayutthaya on a field called the Lumpli Plain.

Maha Chakkraphat left the capital with his forces to engage Tabinshwehti and test Burmese strength. On this occasion, he mounted his chief war elephant. Accompanying him were his Chief Queen, Sri Suriyothai, and one of their young daughters, Princess Boromdhilok, the two riding together on a smaller war elephant. Both royal ladies were dressed in male military attire (helmet and armour), with the queen wearing the uniform of an Uparaja. Also accompanying their father on elephant mounts were two sons, the Uparaja and heir apparent, Prince Ramesuan, and his brother Prince Mahin.

=== Elephant battle and death ===
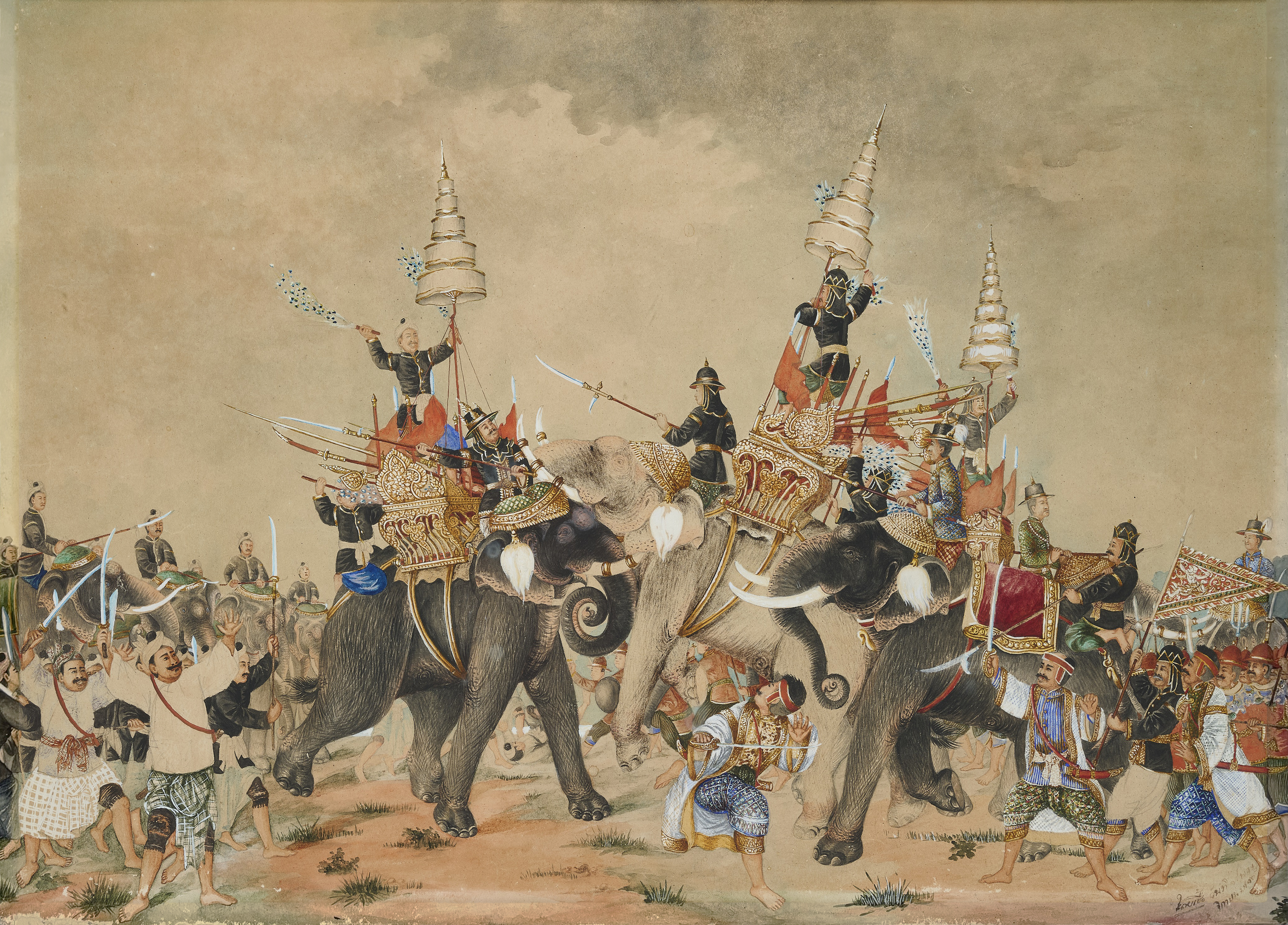
Queen Suriyothai between Viceroy Thado Dhamma Yaza I and King Maha Chakkraphat in 1548

The Siamese army under Maha Chakkraphat soon met the advance column commanded by the Thado Dhamma Yaza, the Viceroy of Prome, and the two armies engaged in battle. The commanders of the two forces engaged in single elephant-combat, as was the custom of the time. Maha Chakkraphat's elephant panicked and gave flight, charging away from the enemy, the viceroy giving chase. Fearing for the life of her husband, Queen Sri Suriyothai charged ahead to put her elephant between the king and the viceroy, thereby blocking his pursuit. The viceroy then engaged the queen in single combat, fatally cleaving her from shoulder to heart with his halberd, also mortally wounding her daughter. Both mother and child met their deaths on the back of the same elephant. It was said that the viceroy did not know he was fighting a woman until his blow struck. As she fell dying, her helmet came off, exposing her long hair. Burmese chronicles do not mention any instance of single combat (on elephant-back or otherwise) by the Viceroy of Prome. (Note: Burmese chronicles (Maha Yazawin Vol. 2 2006: 181–192) and (Hmannan Vol. 2 2003: 238–248) devote a detailed account of the invasion, down to the names of war elephants the high royalty rode on. Thado Dhamma Yaza rode the war elephant named Ye Htut Mingala (Hmannan Vol. 2 2033: 244). If he was victorious in combat against any enemy of significance, such a story with a favorable outcome would likely have been included in the chronicles.)

Prince Ramesuan and Prince Mahin then urged their elephants forward to fight the viceroy, and drove him and his remaining forces from the field, then carried the bodies of their mother and sister back to Ayutthaya. The Siamese king meanwhile rallied his army, and retreated in good order back towards the capital.

== Children ==
- Phra Ramesuan – Upparat, captured and ransomed in 1549, taken as prisoner in 1564, died as a commander of the Burmese army in 1564.
- Phra Mahin – later King Mahinthrathirat.
- Phra Sawatdirat – became wife of Maha Thammaracha, later Queen Wisutkasat, mother of King Naresuan, King Ekathotsarot and Princess Suphankanlaya.
- Phra Boromdilok – died next to her mother in battle.
- Phra Thepkassatri – bride-to-be of King Setthathirath of Lan Xang, kidnapped and taken to Burma.

== Legacy ==
A memorial chedi, Phra Chedi Sisuriyothai, was constructed by King Maha Chakkraphat in honor of Queen Suriyothai. The chedi stands at Wat Suanluang Sopsawan, on the banks of the Chao Phraya River, southwest of the royal palace, and is today part of Ayutthaya Historical Park.

Another monument dedicated to her is the Suriyothai Memorial Park at Tung Makham Yong in Ban Mai Subdistrict, Phra Nakhon Si Ayutthaya District. The park, which features a large statue of the queen riding a war elephant, was established to commemorate Queen Suriyothai and to mark the 60th birthday anniversary of Queen Sirikit in 1992.

A Thai historical film about her life, The Legend of Suriyothai, was released in 2001. It was directed by M.C. Chatrichalerm Yukol of the Thai Royal Family and financed by Queen Sirikit.

In 2013, Opera Siam International premiered S. P. Somtow's ballet-opera Suriyothai in honor of Queen Sirikit's birthday, starring Stacey Tappan and Winita Lohitkul, with Trisdee na Patalung as conductor.

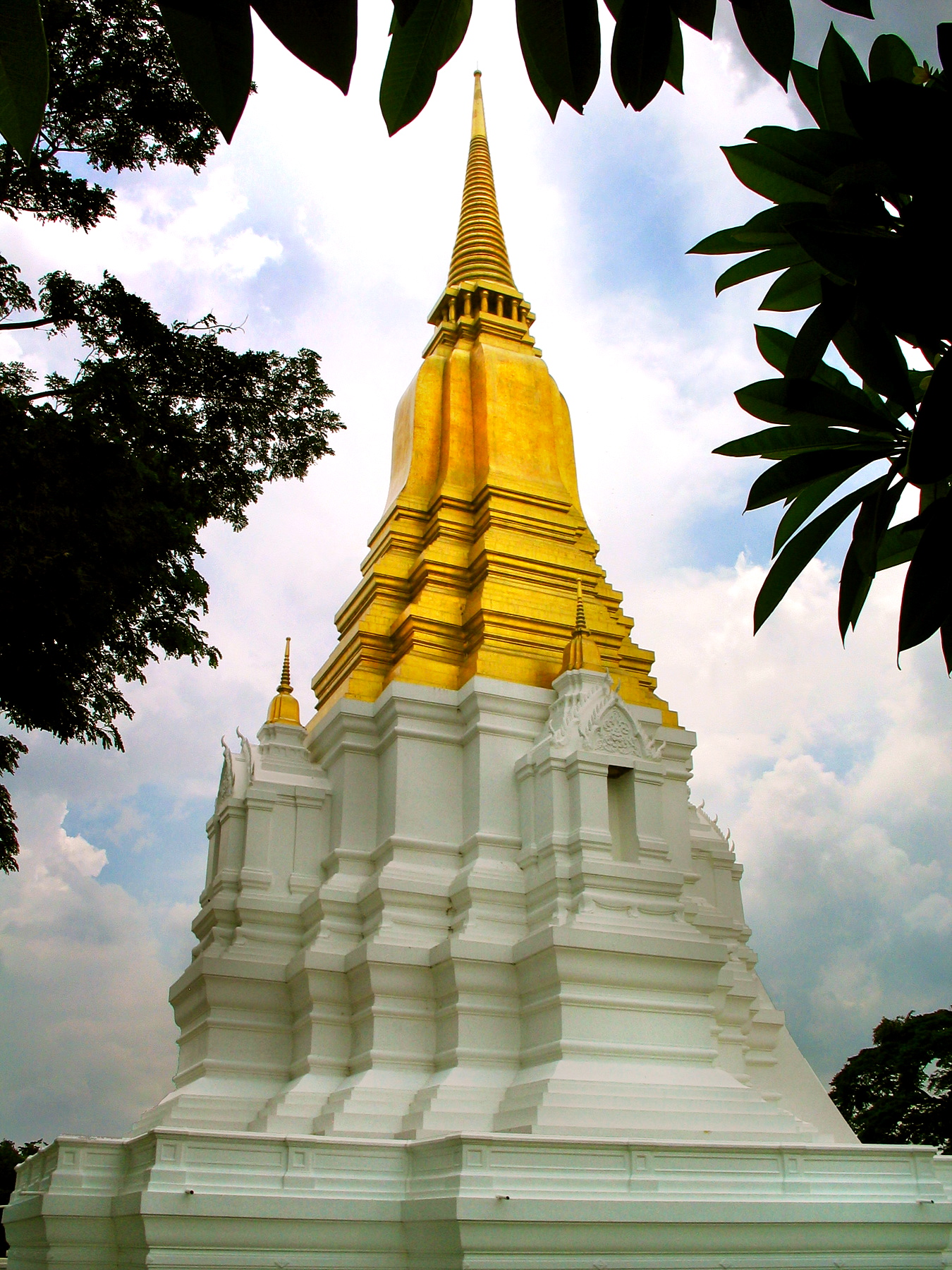
Phra Chedi Sisuriyothai

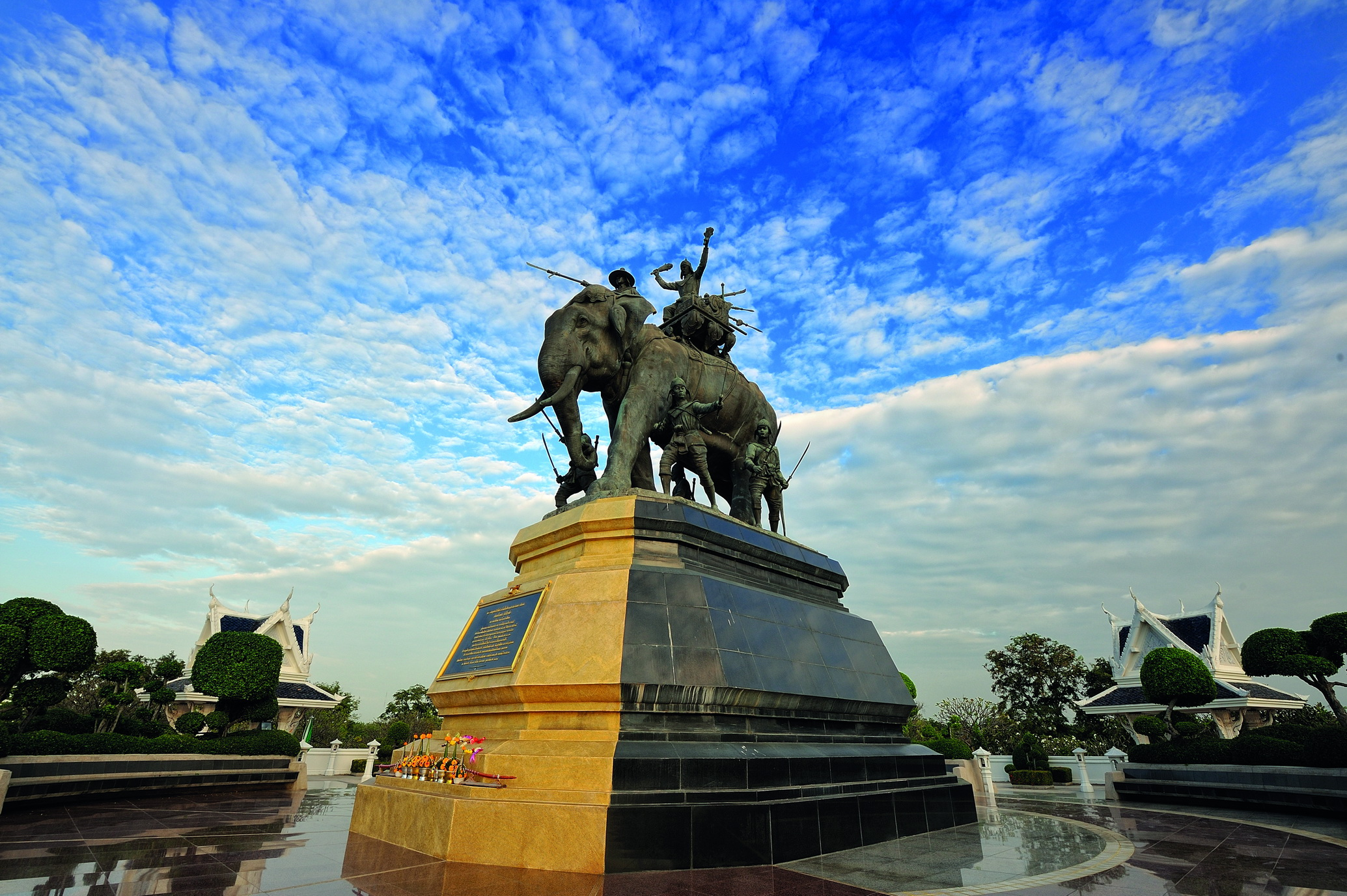
Queen Suriyothai Monument at Ayutthaya
