= Burmese–Siamese War (1547–1549) =

War between the Toungoo and Ayutthaya dynasties

- Part of Burmese–Siamese wars
- Map of the 1548–1549 campaign
| Date | c. October 1547 – February 1549 |
| Location | Upper Tenessarim coast, western and central Siam |
| Result | Inconclusive; Siamese defensive victory Burma claims to regain Upper Tenasserim down to Tavoy (Dawei) |

Belligerents
| Toungoo dynasty Raid by: Longvek Kingdom | Ayutthaya Kingdom (Siam) |

Commanders and leaders
| Tabinshwehti; Bayinnaung; Saw Lagun Ein; Thado Dhamma Yaza; Mingyi Swe; (Portugal) Diogo Soares; Ang Chan I | Maha Chakkraphat; Suriyothai †; Ramesuan (POW); Mahinthrathirat; Maha Thammaracha (POW); (Portugal) Galeote Pereira |

Units involved
| Royal Burmese Army; Royal Burmese Navy; (Portugal) Portuguese mercenaries; Cambodian Army (Raid on Ayutthaya) | Royal Siamese Army; (Portugal) Portuguese mercenaries |

Strength
| 1547–1548; 12,000 troops (Note: The figures here are reduced by an order of magnitude from those given in the Burmese chronicles per (Harvey 1925: 333–335).); Army: 8,000 men, 200 horses, 20 elephants; Navy: 4,000 men (30 war boats, 10 ships); 1548–1549: Start: 12,000 troops, 1,680 horses, 48 elephants; Battle of Ayutthaya: 10,000+ troops, 200+ horses, 20+ elephants; Battle of Kamphaeng Phet: 11,500 troops, 500 horses, 25 elephants (According to Siamese sources, there were 300,000 Burmese soldiers) | 1547–1548; 6,000 troops (Note: Per Burmese chronicles (Hmannan Vol. 2 2003: 238), reduced by an order of magnitude per (Harvey 1925: 333–335)); 1548–1549: Unknown |

Casualties and losses
| Unknown | Unknown |

The Burmese–Siamese War (1547–1549) (Burmese: ယိုးဒယား-မြန်မာစစ် (၁၅၄၇–၄၉); Thai: สงครามพม่า-สยาม พ.ศ. 2090–2092), also known as the Tabinshwehti war (Thai: สงครามพระเจ้าตะเบ็งชเวตี้) was the first war fought between the Toungoo dynasty of Burma and the Ayutthaya Kingdom of Siam, and the first of the Burmese–Siamese wars that would continue until the middle of the 19th century. The war is notable for the introduction of early modern warfare to the region. It is also notable in Thai history for the death in battle of Siamese Queen Suriyothai on her war elephant; the conflict is often referred to in Thailand as the War that Led to the Loss of Queen Suriyothai (สงครามคราวเสียสมเด็จพระสุริโยไท).

The casus belli have been stated as a Burmese attempt to expand their territory eastwards after a political crisis in Ayutthaya as well as an attempt to stop Siamese incursions into the upper Tenasserim coast. The war, according to the Burmese, began in January 1547 when Siamese forces conquered the frontier town of Tavoy (Dawei). Later in the year, the Burmese forces led by Gen. Saw Lagun Ein retook the Upper Tenasserim coast down to Tavoy. Next year, in October 1548, three Burmese armies led by King Tabinshwehti and his deputy Bayinnaung invaded Siam through the Three Pagodas Pass. The Burmese forces penetrated up to the capital city of Ayutthaya but could not take the heavily fortified city. One month into the siege, Siamese counterattacks broke the siege, and drove back the invasion force. A truce was agreed in February 1549. The Burmese negotiated a safe retreat in exchange for the return of two important Siamese nobles (the heir apparent Prince Ramesuan, and Thammaracha of Phitsanulok) whom they had captured.

The successful defense preserved Siamese independence for 15 years. However, this war was not decisive. The next Burmese invasion in 1563 would force a Siamese surrender in February 1564, and make Ayutthaya a vassal state of Burma for the first time.

== Background ==
=== Rise of Toungoo Dynasty ===
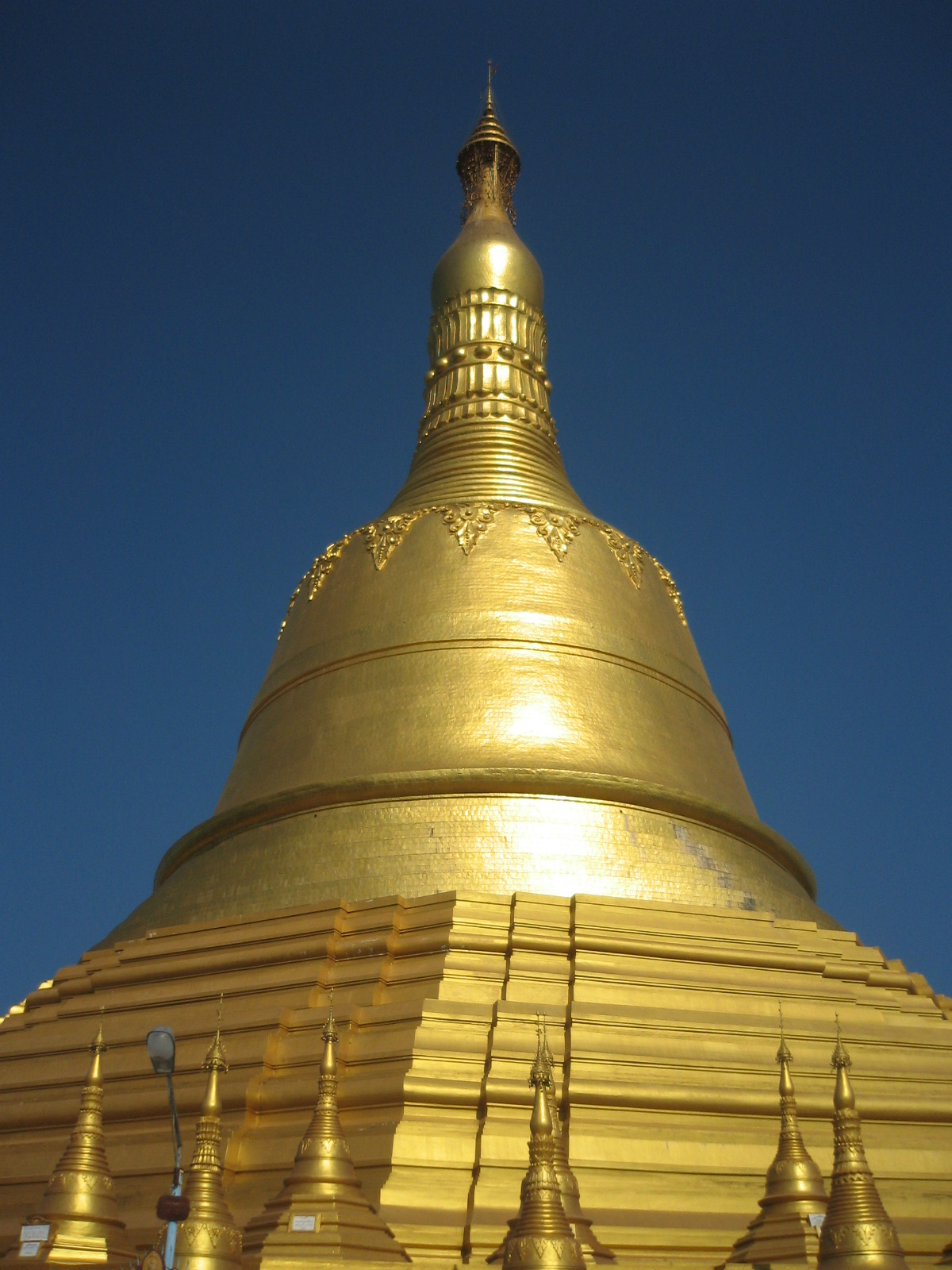
The Shwemawdaw Paya in Pegu (modern day Bago, Myanmar), the city became Tabinshwehti's new capital.

Burma in the 15th century was divided into four principal power centers: the Ava Kingdom in present-day central Burma, the Mon-speaking Hanthawaddy kingdom on the southern coast, the Mrauk-U Kingdom (Arakan) in the west, and various Shan States in the east and the north. Beginning in the 1480s, Ava began to disintegrate into even smaller kingdoms. By the early 15th century, Ava's former vassals—Mohnyin (and its allies Confederation of Shan States) in the north and the Prome Kingdom (Pyay) in the south—were regularly raiding their former overlord's territory with increasing frequency and intensity.

During this period of tumult, Mingyi Nyo, then governor of Toungoo (Taungoo), a small region located at the southeastern corner of Ava Kingdom also declared independence in 1510, and largely stayed out of the internecine fighting in the following years. When Ava fell to the combined forces of the Confederation and Prome in 1527, many people fled to Toungoo, the only region in Upper Burma at peace.

In 1530, Mingyi Nyo's son 14-year-old Tabinshwehti succeeded him as king. Toungoo's stability continued to attract manpower from the surrounding regions, especially after 1533 when the Confederation sacked its erstwhile ally Prome. The tiny Toungoo was now the only ethnic Burman-led kingdom, and one surrounded by much larger kingdoms. Fortunately for Toungoo, the Confederation was distracted by internal leadership disputes, and Hanthawaddy, then the most powerful kingdom of all post-Pagan kingdoms, was weakly led. Tabinshwehti decided not to wait until the larger kingdoms' attention turned to him.

In 1534, Tabinshwehti and his deputy Bayinnaung, then a couple of 18-year-olds, launched their first military campaign against Hanthawaddy. It was the first of a series of wars by Toungoo that would engulf western and central mainland Southeast Asia for the next 80 years. In 1538–1539, the upstart kingdom captured Hanthawaddy's capital Pegu (Bago), and in May 1541, Martaban (Mottama) and Moulmein (Mawlamyaing). Significantly, for the first time, the Burmese and the Siamese shared a common border in the upper-Tenasserim coast.

For the next six years, Toungoo was busy fighting against Hanthawaddy's allies: Prome (1542), the Confederation (1542–1544), and Prome's ally Mrauk-U (1546–1547). On the eve of the Siamese war, in 1547, Toungoo controlled a Lower Burma region from Pagan (Bagan) in the north to Moulmein in the south.

=== Crisis in Ayutthaya ===
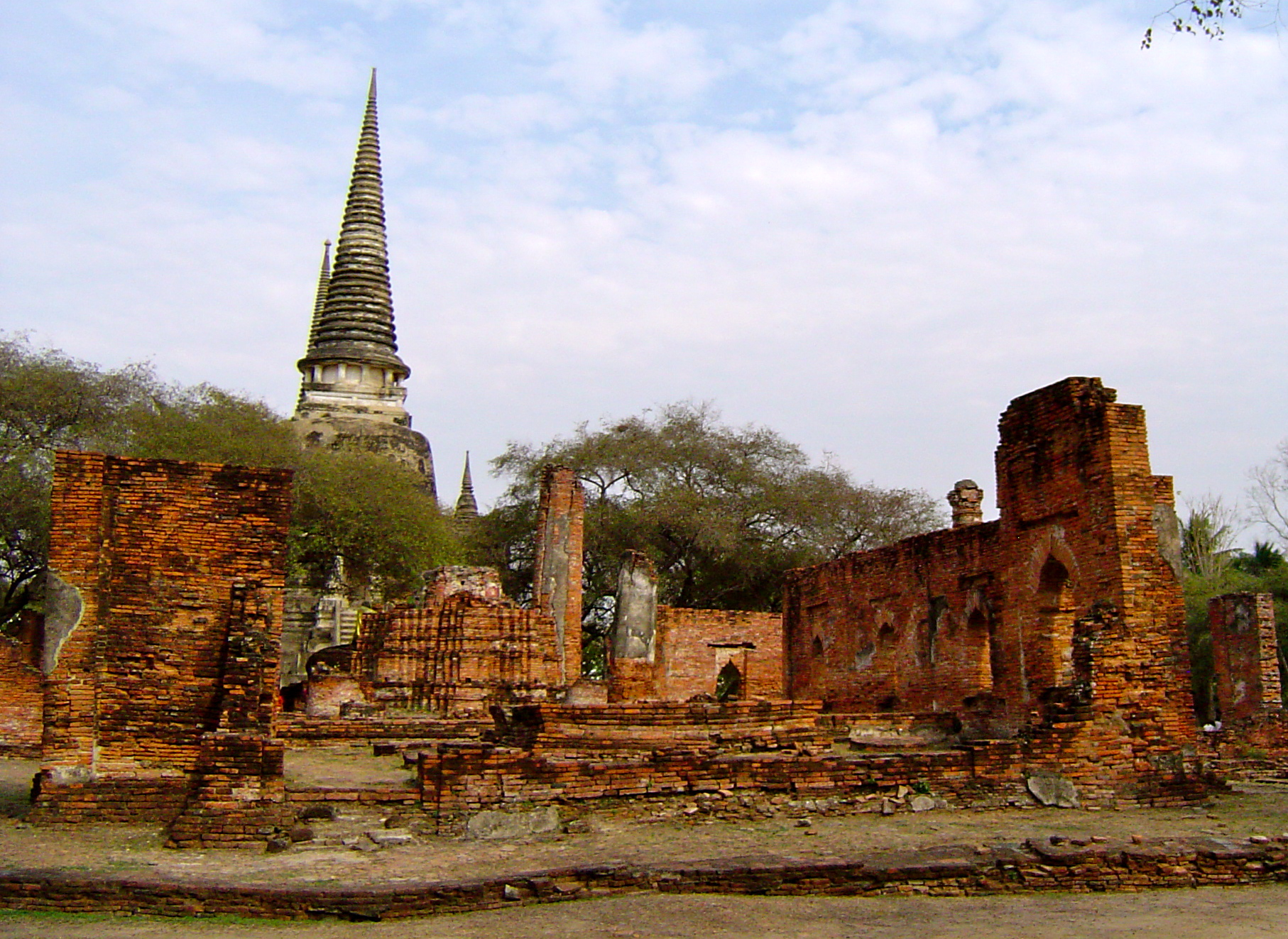
Ruins of the Royal Palace of Ayutthaya, in the Ayutthaya Historical Park, Phra Nakhon Si Ayutthaya Province. The stupas of the royal chapel (Wat Phra Si Sanphet) is in the background.

King Chairacha of Ayutthaya was a scion of the Suphannaphum Dynasty, which took control of Siam from the Uthong Dynasty in 1409. He came to the throne in 1533 after usurping the crown of his five-year-old nephew, Phra Ratsadathirat, who had reigned for only four months. The boy's father was King Borommarachathirat IV, Chairacha's half-brother. The child-king was subsequently executed by his uncle. King Chairacha died in 1546 after reigning for thirteen years, leaving the throne to his eleven-year-old son, Prince Kaeofa, who was crowned King Yot Fa.

As the new king had not come of age, the role of regent was assumed by his mother, Chairacha's chief consort Si Sudachan (ศรีสุดาจันทร์, also spelled Sri Sudachan), who was a descendant of the Uthong royal house. Chairacha's half-brother and Uparaja, Prince Thianracha, was another contender for the regency. To avoid court intrigues and conflict with Si Sudachan, Prince Thianracha retreated to a monastery as a monk. It is said that even before the previous King's death, Si Sudachan was having an adulterous relationship with a paramour styled Khun Chinnarat, who was keeper of the Royal chapel or cloister (หอพระเทพบิดร, Ho Phra Thep Bidon) within the Royal Palace of Ayutthaya. Fernão Mendes Pinto, a contemporary Portuguese explorer, recorded a rumour alleging that Si Sudachan had poisoned her husband in order to take control of the throne, and perhaps to restore the fallen House of Uthong to power. In support of these allegations, she had many prominent officials executed, including the aged and high-ranking Phraya Mahasena (Minister of Defence), and replaced them with her favourites. It was also recorded that she was heavily pregnant and soon gave birth to a daughter; unable to conceal this secret, she mounted a coup, removed her son and put her paramour on the throne. He was crowned as King (or Khun) Worawongsathirat. It was said that the young King Yot Fa was either executed or poisoned by his mother.

Worawongsathirat's reign was short. Within 42 days several nobles and government officials of Ayutthaya plotted to remove him from the throne. The conspirators were led by Khun Phiren Thorathep, a descendant on his father's side to the kings of Sukhothai and a relation on his mother's side to King Chairacha. The usurper was lured from the safety of the palace into the jungle with a promise of capturing a large elephant. As the usurper king, Si Sudachan and their infant daughter proceeded by royal barge, Khun Phiren Thorathep and his conspirators sprang an ambush, killing all three. Thianracha was immediately invited to leave the Sangha and assume the throne as King Maha Chakkraphat. One of his first acts was to appoint Khun Phiren Thorathep as King of Sukhothai (but as a vassal to himself) with a capital at the great fortified town of Phitsanulok. The king then bestowed upon him the title Maha Thammaracha (a title used by the last four kings of Sukhothai), along with the hand of his daughter Princess Sawatdirat in marriage.

== Tenasserim (1547–1548) ==
The war began in 1547. The casus belli has been stated as an attempt by the Toungoo Dynasty of Burma to expand its territory eastwards after a political crisis in Ayutthaya as well as an attempt to stop Ayutthaya's incursions into the upper Tenasserim coast. According to the Burmese chronicles, a Siamese force of 6,000 had occupied Tavoy (Dawei) in the Upper Tenasserim coast, which he considered his territory, by January 1547. (Note: Burmese chronicles (Hmannan Vol. 2 2003: 238) say Tabinshwehti learned of the Siamese occupation of Tavoy before he agreed to a truce with King Min Bin of Mrauk-U on 31 January 1547 (9th waxing of Tabodwe 908 ME).) As frontiers in the pre-modern period were less defined and often overlapped, the "occupation" may have been an attempt by Ayutthaya to reinforce the frontier town, which was claimed by Toungoo. At any rate, Tabinshwehti sent a sizable force of 12,000 (8,000 army, 4,000 navy) led by Saw Lagun Ein, viceroy of Martaban, to take over Tavoy c. October/November 1547. (Note: The invasion likely began in late October/early November 1547 although Burmese chronicles (Hmannan Vol. 2 2003: 238–239) simply say the attack on Tavoy began in 909 ME (30 March 1547 to 28 March 1548). The attack probably did not take place in early 1547 since Tabinshwehti's troops evacuated southern Arakan only on 26 March 1547 (5th waxing of Late Tagu 908 ME). The troops would have arrived back only in mid-to-late April, leaving just about a month for a military campaign before the rainy season began in June. The invasion, like most wars by the Burmese kings, probably began toward the end of rainy season and after the end of Buddhist Lent, which ended on 13 October 1547 (New moon of Thadingyut 909 ME) that year.) A joint land-naval attack on Tavoy drove out the Siamese forces led by the Lord of Kanchanaburi to lower Tenasserim.

== Invasion of mainland Siam (1548–1549) ==
Map of western central Thailand, depicting the towns captured by King Tabinshwehti's army. The plan of the city of Ayutthaya is shown with all the surrounding canals depicted.

=== Burmese battle plan ===
Tabinshwehti was not satisfied, and planned an invasion of Siam itself. By October 1548, he had assembled another 12,000-strong force that also included about 400 Portuguese mercenaries led by Diogo Soares. The invasion force would have been equipped with the conventional weapons of the day: swords, bow and arrows, and spears. The more elite members would also carry matchlocks or muskets. These early modern weapons having been introduced to the two kingdoms by the Portuguese a few decades earlier.

Tabinshwehti took personal command and gathered his forces at Martaban (Mottama). The invasion forces were organized into three main armies: the vanguard army led by Bayinnaung, the main army led by Tabinshwehti, and the rearguard army led by Thado Dhamma Yaza and Mingyi Swe, each with a strength of 4,000 troops. Their route of invasion was via the Three Pagodas Pass towards Kanchanaburi, and then to the capital Ayutthaya.

=== Start of invasion ===
On 14 October 1548 (13th waxing of Tazaungmon 910 ME), the three Burmese armies left Martaban to start the invasion. The armies marched along the Ataran River toward the Three Pagodas Pass, entered Siam along the Khwae Noi River to the town of Sai Yok, then overland towards the Khwae Yai River. From there they travelled by boat toward the town of Kanchanaburi. Tabinshwehti travelled in great state with a massive retinue of elephants and servants. Many of these elephants carried muskets and bronze cannon; these were kept close to the king. Royal elephants were rafted across rivers, while the ordinary war elephants marched upstream to a ford. The Burmese king was accompanied by his crown prince Bayinnaung, Bayinnaung's thirteen-year-old son Nanda, and many richly attired lords. Hundreds of workmen marched ahead of the king's retinue, to pitch a richly decorated wooden camp, painted and gilded for the King's use, only to pack it up and pitch it at a new location every day.

The invasion initially met little resistance, as the Burmese forces were too large for the small guard posts around the border. Upon hearing of the Burmese invasion, Maha Chakkraphat mobilized his kingdom, then gathered his forces at Suphanburi, a town just west of Ayutthaya. When Tabinshwehti and his army arrived at the walled town of Kanchanaburi, they found it completely deserted. About a month into the invasion, mid-November 1548, (Note: The Hmannan Yazawin chronicle (Hmannan Vol. 2 2003: 241) uses the term လပြည့်, [la̰bjḛ], which can be translated as either "full moon" or "full month" (completion of a month), to describe when he began the march to Ayutthaya. If it was full moon, the date of departure from Kanchanaburi would be 15 November 1548 (Full moon of Natdaw 910 ME). If it was full month, it would be 13 November 1548 (13th waxing of Natdaw 910 ME).) the King of Burma then continued his march eastward, capturing the villages of Ban Thuan, Kaphan Tru, and Chorakhe Sam Phan. The Burmese continued their advance and captured the ancient town of Uthong as well as the villages of Don Rakhang and Nong Sarai and closing in on Suphanburi. When the Burmese attacked the town, Siamese defenders could not withstand the onslaught and retreated towards Ayutthaya. Tabinshwehti ordered his army southeast along two canals, and crossed the Chao Phraya river near Phong Phaeng. From here he encamped his army directly north of the Siamese capital of Ayutthaya on a field called the Lumpli plain.

== Battle of Ayutthaya ==
=== At the outskirts ===
Maha Chakkraphat decided to leave the capital with his forces, to engage Tabinshwehti and test the Burmese strength. On this occasion, he mounted his chief war elephant. Accompanying him were his Chief Queen, Sri Suriyothai, and one of their young daughters, Princess Boromdilok, the two riding together on a smaller war elephant. Both royal ladies were dressed in male military attire (helmet and armour), with the queen wearing the uniform of an Uparaja. Also accompanying their father on elephant mounts were two sons, the Uparaja and heir apparent, Prince Ramesuan, and his brother Prince Mahin.

A battle certainly ensued although there are naturally two accounts as to what actually took place. According to the Burmese chronicles, the Burmese command fielded an army led by Thado Dhamma Yaza, the Viceroy of Prome, as a decoy and the two armies lurked on the flanks in order to encircle any overstretched Siamese forces. As planned, the Siamese vanguard troops pressed on Thado Dhamma Yaza's army, allowing Bayinnaung's army waiting on the left flank to encircle the Siamese forces, which subsequently were wiped out. Tabinshwehti's army on the right flank drove back the remaining Siamese forces into the city.

=== Elephant duel ===
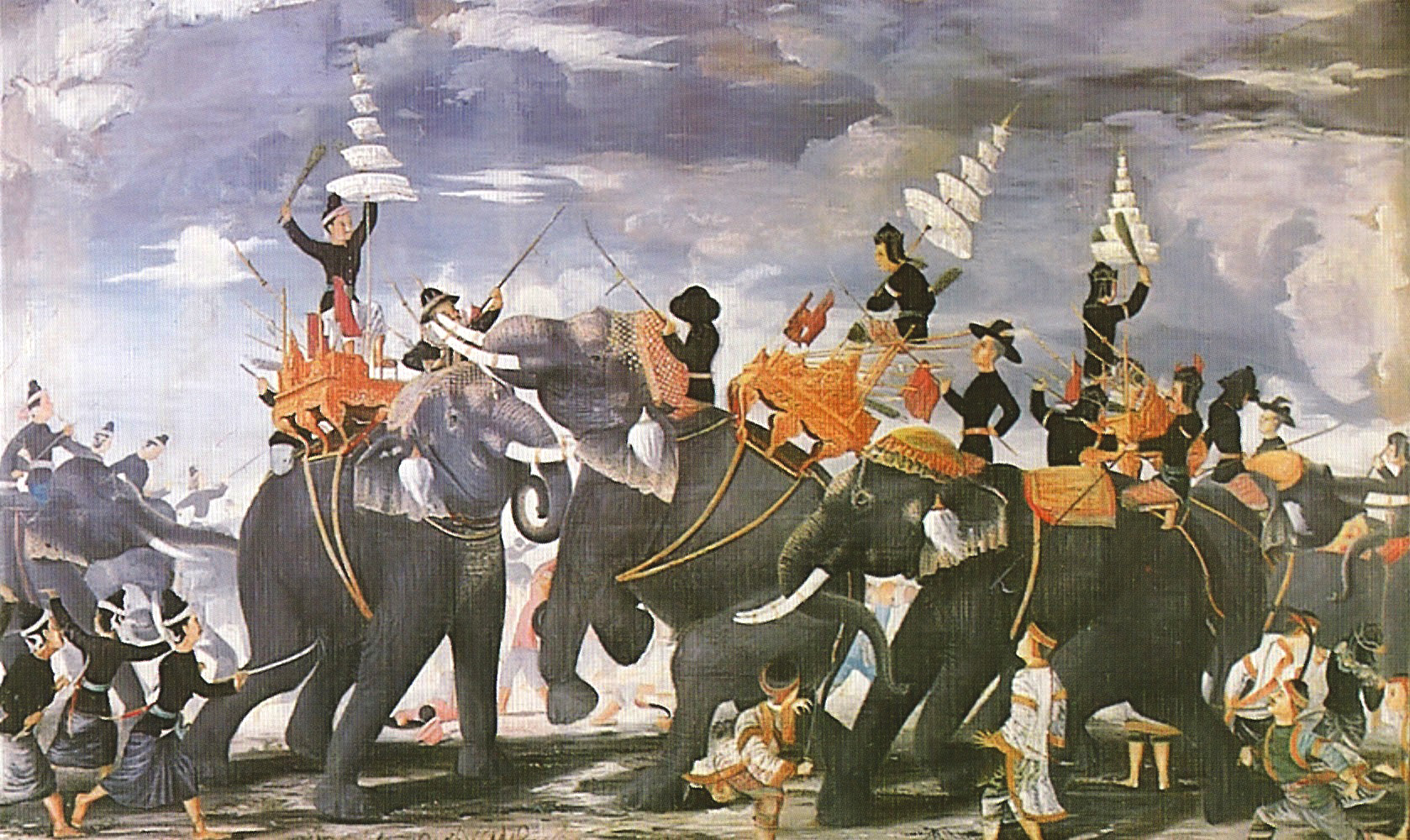
Painting by Prince Narisara Nuvadtivongs, depicting Queen Suriyothai (center) on her elephant putting herself between King Maha Chakkraphat (right) and the Viceroy of Prome (left).

According to Thai tradition, Thado Dhamma Yaza and Maha Chakkraphat engaged in single elephant-combat. (The custom of the time was for two commanders/leaders of the same status to fight in single combat. It is unclear as to why the Siamese king would have accepted to face someone of lesser rank. If he did issue the challenge, he would have challenged his counterpart Tabinshwehti and accepted to face only Tabinshwehti.) The Thai narrative continues that Maha Chakkraphat's elephant panicked and gave flight, charging away from the enemy; Thado Dhamma Yaza swiftly gave chase. Fearing for the life of her husband, Queen Sri Suriyothai charged ahead to put her elephant between the King and the Viceroy, thereby blocking his pursuit. The Viceroy then engaged the Queen in single combat, fatally cleaving her from shoulder to heart with his spear, also wounding her daughter—both mother and child met their deaths on the back of the same elephant. It is said that the Viceroy did not know he was fighting a woman until his blow struck—as she fell dying her helmet came off, exposing her long hair. Prince Ramesuan and Prince Mahin then urged their elephants forward to fight the Viceroy, drove him and his remaining forces from the field, then carried the bodies of their mother and sister back to Ayutthaya. The Siamese king meanwhile rallied his army, and retreated in good order back towards the capital. The Burmese chronicles however do not mention any instance of single combat (on elephant-back or otherwise) by the viceroy of Prome. (Note: Burmese chronicles (Maha Yazawin Vol. 2 2006: 181–192) and (Hmannan Vol. 2 2003: 238–248) devote a detailed account of the invasion, down to the names of war elephants the high royalty rode on. Thado Dhamma Yaza rode the war elephant named Ye Htut Mingala (Hmannan Vol. 2 2033: 244). If he was victorious in combat against any enemy of significance, such a story with a favorable outcome would likely have been included in the chronicles.)

At any rate, the remaining Siamese forces retreated. Tabinshwehti readied his army for a siege of the Siamese capital. He made his camp north of the city, with his headquarters at Klum Dong, and had his commanders encamp in strategic places surrounding the city walls, Bayinnaung at Phaniat, the Viceroy at Ban Mai Makham, and the Governor of Bassein at the plain of Prachet. The Burmese would not, however, take the Siamese capital so easily.

=== Siege ===
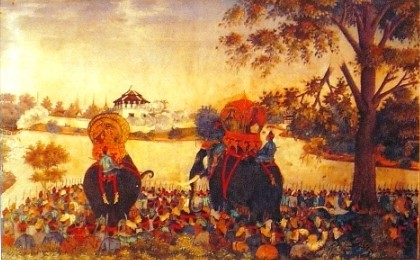
Ayutthaya people fired cannons for counter attacking the army of King Tabinshweti during the Siege of Ayutthaya in 1549.

Ayutthaya sat on an island surrounded by three rivers—the Lopburi River to the north, the Chao Phraya River to the west and south, and the Pa Sak River to the east, forming a formidable natural moat. The Chao Phraya basin where Ayutthaya is situated was low and prone to flooding—especially intense during the rainy season when torrential waters flowed in great quantity from the north along the Lopburi River. This flood would begin approximately in July and end somewhere between October and November, giving Tabinshwehti only five months to capture Ayutthaya—otherwise his camp grounds and supply routes would be flooded. There was also the possibility that the flood could trap his forces. The low, swampy area around the city was laced with numerous canals thronging with gun boats armed with cannon to repulse any attempt at an attack on the city. Also, the Burmese had only small cannons that they had brought with them, while the Siamese had large cannons mounted along the city walls. The Burmese had the city surrounded, but without the ability to cross the rivers or breach the city walls with cannon fire, were left to camp around it instead, while the interconnected waterways to the north and south made it fairly easy to resupply the defenders in the city. Fifty Portuguese mercenaries, who had elected Galeote Pereira as their captain, defended the weakest part of the city wall for Maha Chakkraphat. Unable to take the city conventionally, Tabinshwehti offered bribes to these defenders. The Portuguese reacted with derision, and refused. When a Siamese commander heard of this, he swung open the gates of the city and dared the Burmese King to bring the money—a dare that was ignored.

Maha Chakkraphat, being unable to repel the Burmese, sent a message to his son-in-law Maha Thammaracha at Phitsanulok, ordering his vassal to come to his aid by bringing an army southwards towards Ayutthaya and if possible to engage the enemy in battle. Thammaracha quickly mobilized his forces and with the help of the Governor of Sawankhalok, marched southward with a large army to attack the Burmese rear. Upon hearing of this and on the advice of Bayinnaung; Tabinshwehti decided to withdraw, abandoning the mission altogether. His decision was compounded by news from Burma that the Mons, who had never been entirely subjugated by the Taungoo dynasty, rebelled in the absence of the king. Other factors included the scarcity of supplies and sickness in his army, which was not prepared for a long siege.

Just one month into the siege, the Burmese command decided to withdraw.

== Battle of Kamphaeng Phet ==
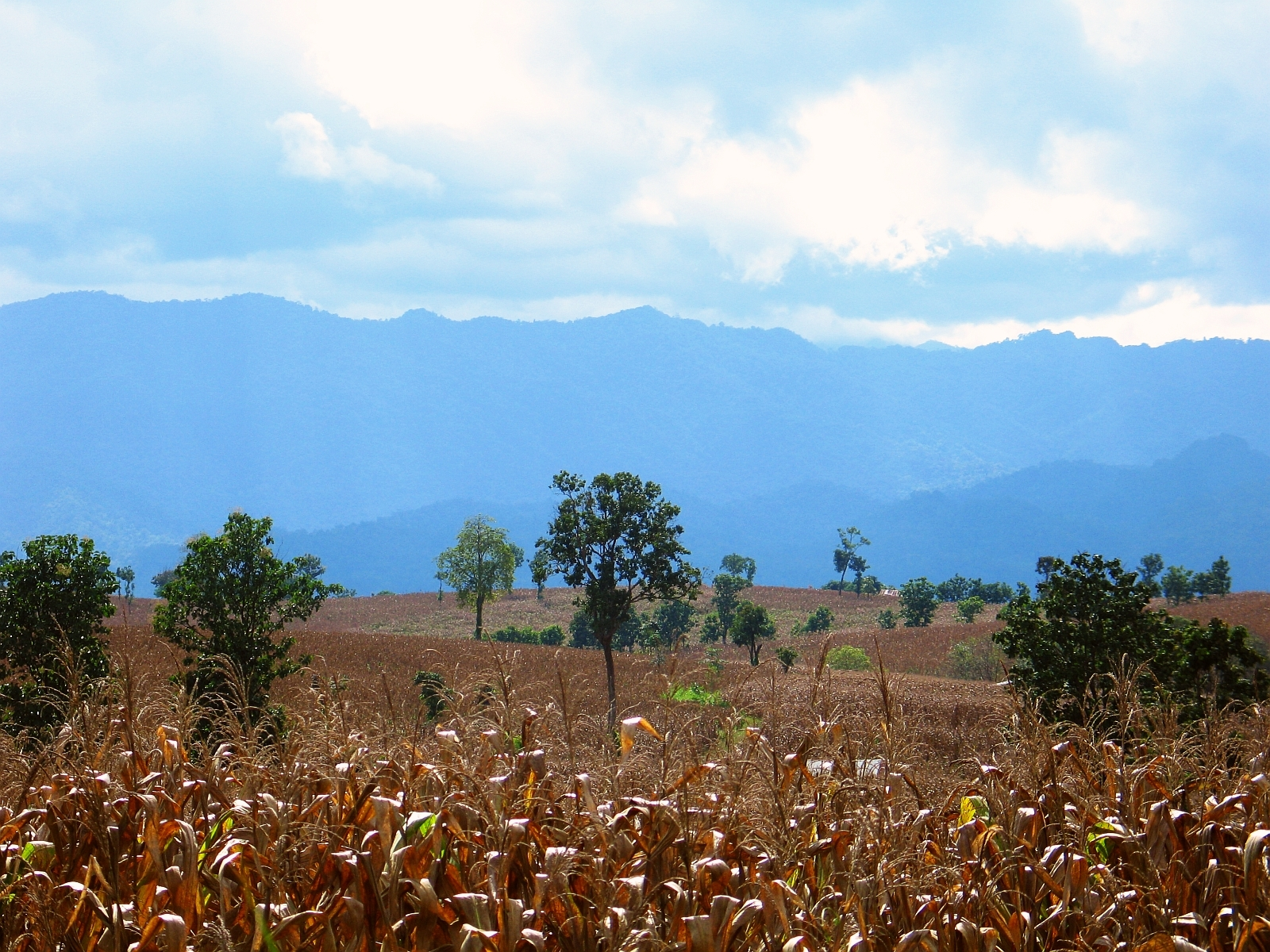
The view from Tak Province (Thailand) towards Dawna Range (Myanmar), not far from the Mae Lamao pass, the Burmese route of retreat

=== Retreat from Siam ===
After failing to capture the capital of Ayutthaya, the Burmese forces marched north to get back to Burma via the Mae Lamao pass (in modern-day Mae Sot, Tak).

=== Siege of Kamphaeng Phet ===
While retreating back to Burma, the Burmese army tried to plunder the ancient and wealthy town of Kamphaeng Phet but the town was too well fortified. With the help of Portuguese mercenaries, the governor of Kamphaeng Phet repelled the Burmese with flaming projectiles that forced the Burmese to cease using their cannons and protect them with coverings of damp hides.

=== Battle of Kamphaeng Phet ===
Maha Chakkraphat saw the Burmese army's retreat as an opportunity to take advantage of their weakness, so he ordered Prince Ramesuan and Thammaracha to follow and harass the enemy out of Siamese territory. For three days, the Siamese chased the invaders, inflicting great losses upon them. Once the forces of Ramesuan and Thammaracha closed in, Tabinshwehti made a stand near Kamphaeng Phet, dividing his forces on both sides of the road. The Siamese in their eagerness fell into the trap. The Burmese captured both Prince Ramesuan and Maha Thammaracha as prisoners of war.

== Truce ==
The capture of his heir and his son-in-law forced Maha Chakkraphat to negotiate with Tabinshwehti. The Siamese at once sent emissaries bearing gifts, offering a peaceful retreat in return for the two princes. In exchange Maha Chakkraphat was forced to hand over to Tabinshwehti two prized male war elephants called Sri Mongkol (ศรีมงคล) and Mongkol Thawip (มงคลทวีป). Once the elephants were handed over, the Burmese army retreated in peace. In addition to the two princes, Tabinshwehti also released many other prisoners he had captured during the campaign. According to the Burmese records, the Siamese king also agreed to provide an annual gift of 30 elephants, a token sum of money, and certain custom duties.

After the treaty, the Burmese king rested for eight days, and returned to Pegu. He arrived back at Pegu on 1 March 1549 (3rd waxing of Late Tagu 910 ME).

== Aftermath ==
Despite his failure to take Ayutthaya, Tabinshwehti claimed to have regained control of the Tavoy frontier. Indeed, the Burmese chronicles claim the Siamese king had agreed to pay an annual tribute. Even if this claim was true, the Toungoo Dynasty's control over Tavoy lasted a little over a year in any case. Tabinshwehti was assassinated just a year after the Siamese campaign on 30 April 1550, and the empire he had built in the previous 16 years quickly collapsed, with each town claiming a king. Even after Bayinnaung had restored the kingdom in the following years, the frontier region was likely under overlapping spheres of influence. (During his 1554–1555 campaign against Upper Burma, his southernmost garrison was at Ye, not Tavoy.) It was only in 1562 that Bayinnaung made an emphatic claim on the region by setting up a Burmese garrison at Tavoy, (Note: (Hmannan Vol. 2 2003: 338): Wednesday, Full moon of Waso 924 ME = 17 June 1562) in preparation for his invasion of Siam a year later.

== Legacy ==
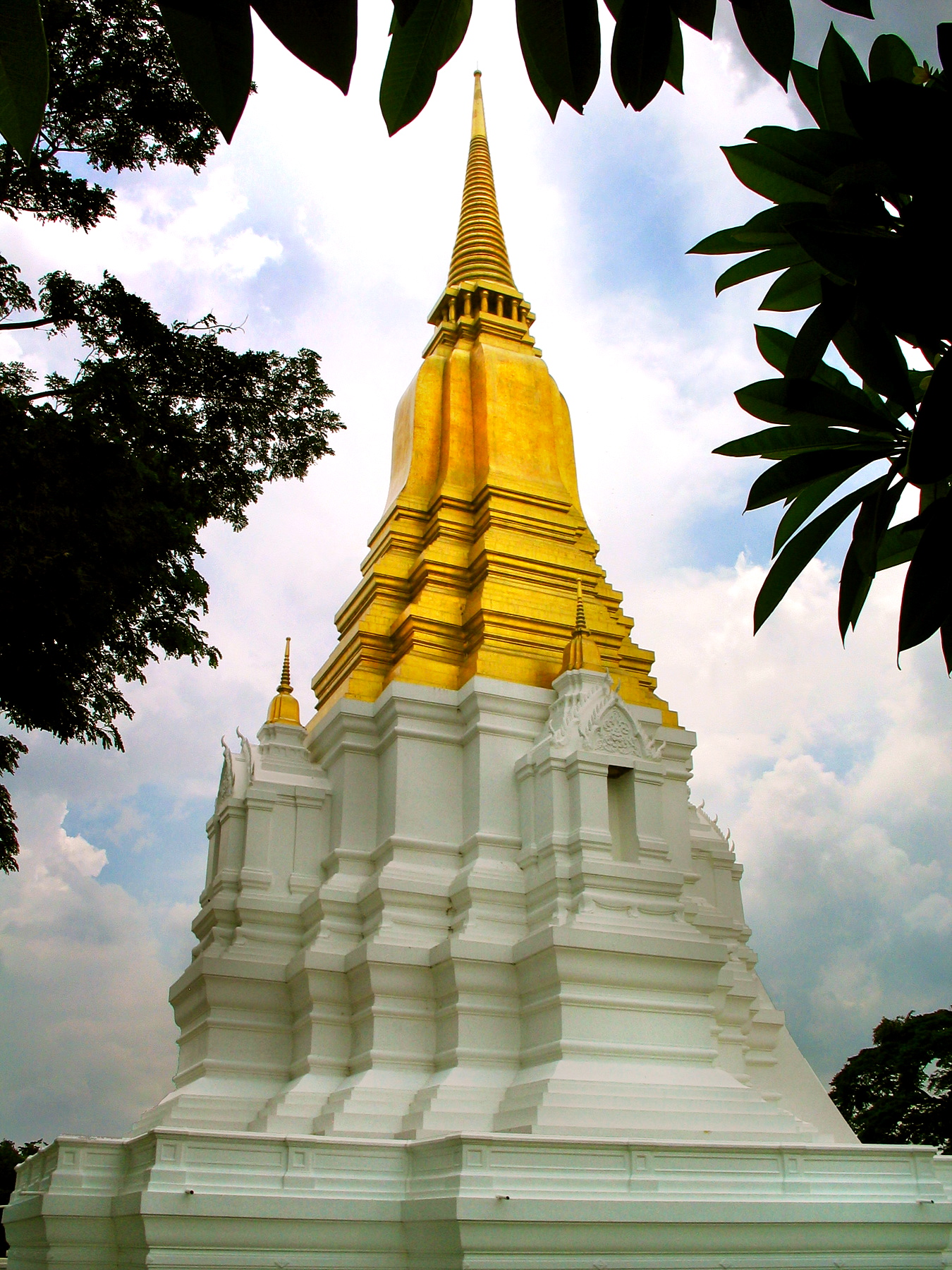
The restored Phra Chedi Sri Suriyothai at Wat Suan Luang Sop Sawan, Phra Nakhon Si Ayutthaya Province.

The war was the first of the many wars between Burma and Siam that would last well into the mid-19th century. It was also the first time the city of Ayutthaya was actually attacked by a foreign enemy.

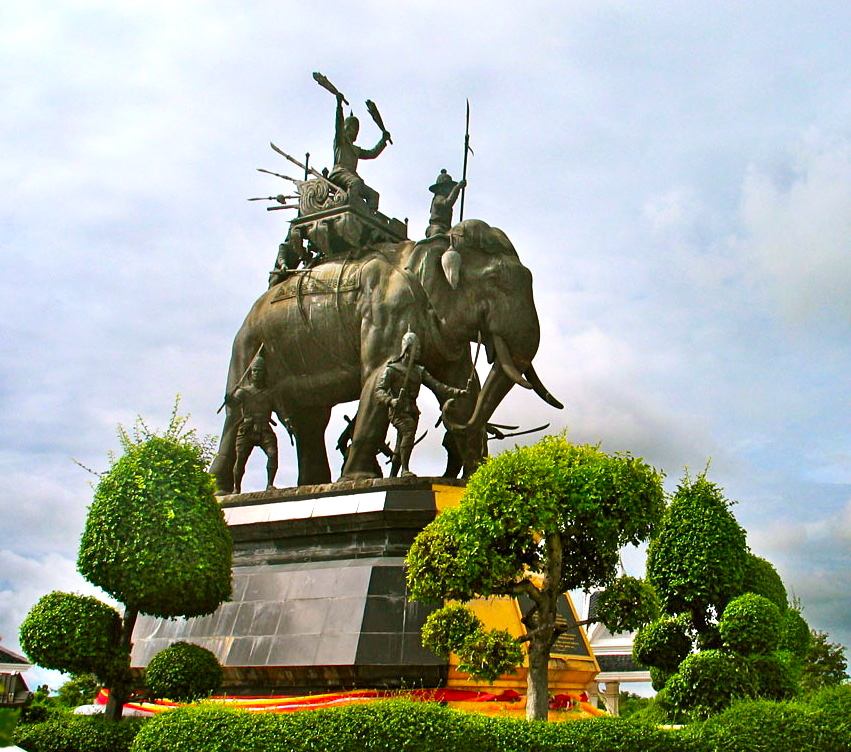
Queen Suriyothai Memorial, Phra Nakhon Si Ayutthaya Province

The body of Queen Sri Suriyothai was placed at Suan Luang, the Royal Garden. Maha Chakkraphat ordered a grand cremation, and built a temple with a large stupa to house her remains. The temple, which still exists, is known as Wat Suan Luang Sop Sawan (วัดสวนหลวงสบสวรรค์) and the stupa is called Chedi Phra Sri Suriyothai (เจดีย์พระศรีสุริโยทัย). The temple and the stupa had been restored and rebuilt several times. Despite her stature among the Thais for her heroism, the historicity of her story and her existence has been the subject of debate. This is based on the fact that the queen is not mentioned in either the recorded or popular history of Myanmar. All the facts pertaining to her life were taken from fragments of the Siamese royal chronicle the Annals of Ayutthaya and an account by Domingos Seixas, a Portuguese explorer.

The war led to the strengthening of Ayutthaya's defences, such as stronger walls and forts. A census of all able-bodied men was taken, as well as a massive hunt for wild elephants for use in future wars. The size of the navy was also increased.

The Siamese success at repelling the Burmese would not be repeated. This first ever invasion gave the Burmese an important experience on fighting with Siamese. The next invasion would be conducted by Bayinnaung, a man accustomed to fighting against Siamese soldiers and familiar with marching through Siamese terrain. The unrest in Burma delayed that next invasion for fifteen years, until the War of 1563 or the War of the White Elephants.

== Media ==
The war, beginning with the death of Chairacha, was dramatized in the 2001 Thai historical drama The Legend of Suriyothai, directed by Mom Chao Chatrichalerm Yukol. The film portrays the events leading up to the war and the battles including the death of Queen Sri Suriyothai. The film cost an estimated 350 million baht, and is the highest budget Thai film to date. The film was released in the United States in 2003.

The succession crisis Ayutthaya is portrayed in the 2005 English language Thai film The King Maker. The film ends prior to the Burmese invasion.

== See also ==
- Ayutthaya Kingdom
- Toungoo dynasty
- Early Modern warfare
- Phraya (Thai nobility)

== Bibliography ==
- Cocks, S. W. (1919). A Short History of Burma (at www.archive.org) (Second ed.). London: Macmillan and Co.
- Damrong Rajanubhab, Prince Disuankumaan (2001) [1917]. Our Wars with the Burmese: Thai-Burmese Conflict 1539–1767. Translated by Baker, Chris. Thailand: White Lotus Co. Ltd. ISBN 974-7534-58-4.
- Fernquest, Jon (Autumn 2005). "Min-gyi-nyo, the Shan Invasions of Ava (1524–27), and the Beginnings of Expansionary Warfare in Toungoo Burma: 1486–1539". SOAS Bulletin of Burma Research. 3 (2). ISSN 1479-8484.
- Harvey, G. E. (1925). History of Burma: From the Earliest Times to 10 March 1824. London: Frank Cass & Co. Ltd.
- Htin Aung, Maung (1967). A History of Burma. New York and London: Cambridge University Press.
- Jirattikorn, Amporn (August 2003). "Suriyothai: Hybridizing Thai National Identity Through Film". Inter-Asia Cultural Studies. 4 (2): 296–308. doi:10.1080/1464937032000113015. S2CID 145109859.
- Phayre, Lt. Gen. Sir Arthur P. (1883). History of Burma (1967 ed.). London: Susil Gupta.
- Quaritch Wales, Horace Geoffrey (1952). Ancient South-east Asian Warfare. London: Bernard Quaritch Ltd.
- Royal Historical Commission of Burma (1832). Hmannan Yazawin (in Burmese). Vol. 1–3 (2003 ed.). Yangon: Ministry of Information, Myanmar.
- Sein Lwin Lay, Kahtika U (1968). Mintaya Shwe Hti and Bayinnaung: Ketumadi Taungoo Yazawin (in Burmese) (2006, 2nd printing ed.). Yangon: Yan Aung Sarpay.
- Wood, William A. R. (1924). History of Siam. Thailand: Chalermit Press. ISBN 1-931541-10-8.
