= Ramesuan (prince of Ayutthaya) =

Ramesuan ราเมศวร

Viceroy of Ayutthaya
- Reign: 1548–1563
- Predecessor: Chan
- Successor: Mahin
- Died: November 1564; Lan Na
Names
- Ramesuan
- Dynasty: Suphannaphum
- Father: Maha Chakkraphat
- Mother: Suriyothai

Prince Ramesuan (Thai: พระราเมศวร; Burmese: ဗြရာမသွန်; d. November 1564) was a 16th-century Siamese prince and military commander of the Ayutthaya Kingdom. He was the eldest son of King Maha Chakkraphat and Queen Suriyothai, and a member of the Suphannaphum dynasty. He had four younger siblings: a brother, Mahin (later King Mahinthrathirat), and three sisters, Wisut Kasattri, Boromdilok, and Thepkassatri. Following the Burmese–Siamese War (1563–1564) (the War of the White Elephants), he was taken to Pegu as a hostage in March 1564. He subsequently served as a commander in the Royal Burmese Army and died of illness in November 1564 during a military campaign against Lan Na.

== First war ==
In 1548 his father ascended the throne as King of Ayutthaya, he immediately became heir and Uparaja of Siam. During the First Siege of Ayutthaya war with Toungoo Dynasty, Prince Ramesuan together with the King, the Queen, Prince Mahin and Princess Boromdhilok left the walls of the city on their war elephants to engage the Burmese forces led by King Tabinshwehti of Pegu in battle. In the combat with the Thado Dhamma Yaza, the Viceroy of Prome both his mother and his sister lost their lives. It was recorded in Siamese history that it was Prince Ramesuan who returned his mother's lifeless body to the capital. After a failed siege of the capital city, Tabinshwehti and his forces decided to retreat northward near Mae Sot.

Prince Ramesuan and Maha Thammaracha was ordered to pursue the retreating forces, costing many Burmese lives. Soon the Burmese decided to stand ground and ambush the Siamese forces near Kamphaeng Phet, by dividing their forces on two sides of the road and outflanking Prince Ramesuan's forces. As a result, Prince Ramesuan and Maha Thammaracha was captured by the Burmese. This prompted Maha Chakkraphat to negotiate a peace with Tabinshwehti, which resulted in the turning over of two great war elephants and a cease fire. Prince Ramesuan and Thammaracha was released and the Burmese was allowed to retreat unmolested. After the war, the Prince was part of the party inside the Royal court that favoured the dismantling of the walls of the cities of Suphanburi, Lopburi and Nakhon Nayok, this was implemented as a way of depriving a future Burmese invasion with a fortified stronghold, only a day's march from the capital.

== Second war ==
Maha Chakkraphat after the war of 1548, led a massive hunt for wild elephants (for use in future conflicts), which led to the discovery of seven white elephants. A symbol of prestige as well as honour, their discovery was celebrated by the kingdom, as a sign of the king's righteousness and power. In 1563, Bayinnaung (who succeeded Tabinshwehti in 1551) upon hearing of this news, decided to use the elephants as a pretext for an invasion, by requesting for two of Maha Chakkraphat's white elephants. The 'war party' led by Prince Ramesuan urged the king not to fulfill the request and face certain invasion instead.

Following the advice of his heir, Maha Chakkarphat refused and soon enough Bayinnaung invaded Siam. The towns of Sawankhalok, Sukhothai and Phichai fell to the invading forces. After holding out for many months the city of Phitsanulok surrendered to the Burmese forces, and Prince Ramesuan's brother-in-law, Maha Thammaracha decided to swear his allegiance to Bayinnaung.

The city of Ayutthaya was able to withstand the siege by Burmese forces for many months. However, with the help of Portuguese mercenaries, Bayinnaung was able to constantly bombard the city with cannon fire and flaming projectiles. The inhabitants of the city fearful of the noise and exhausted by the war, petitioned the king to surrender to the enemy and end their suffering. By this time Prince Ramesuan and the war party had lost all credibility within the war council, seeing no other choice the king obliged.

Thus Siam became a vassal of Burma on 18 February 1564. With this submission, Bayinnaung was able to create the largest empire in the history of Southeast Asia.

== Later life ==
As part of the peace settlement, the prince along with his father the fallen king and thousands of people were taken to Pegu in Burma on 28 March 1564, arriving there on 15 May 1564. His wife and immediate family also came. The Siamese royal family were given quarters befitting their former status in Pegu. In October 1564, the prince, who was in poor health, nonetheless agreed to march to Lan Na along with the main Burmese army to put down the ongoing rebellion by King Mekuti of Lan Na. The ailing prince died en route to Lan Na in November 1564. (Note: He died sometime between 23 October 1564 (start of campaign) and 25 November 1564 (Mekuti's surrender) per (Maha Yazawin Vol. 2 2006: 278).)

== See also ==
- Burmese–Siamese War (1547–49)
- Maha Chakkraphat
- Suriyothai
- Ayutthaya Kingdom

== Bibliography ==
- Wood, William A. R. (1924). History of Siam. Bangkok: Chalermit Press. ISBN 1-931541-10-8.
- U Kala (2006) [1724]. မဟာရာဇဝင်ကြီး [Maha Yazawin] (in Burmese). Vol. 1–3 (4th printing ed.). Yangon: Ya-Pyei Publishing.

Ramesuan (prince of Ayutthaya) House of Suphannaphum Born: ? Died: November 1564
Regnal titles
Preceded by Chan	Viceroy of Ayutthaya; 1548–1563	Vacant Title next held by Mahin
