= Maha Thammaracha (king of Ayutthaya) =

King of Ayutthaya from 1569 to 1590

Maha Thammaracha มหาธรรมราชา

King of Ayutthaya
- Reign: 29 September 1569 – 30 June 1590 (1569–1584 as tributary king) (1584–1590 as sovereign king)
- Predecessor: Mahinthrathirat
- Successor: Naresuan
- Suzerian: Bayinnaung (1569–1581); Nanda Bayin (1581–1584)

King of Phitsanulok
- Reign: 1548–1569
- Predecessor: Chettathirat (as King of Sukhothai)
- Successor: Naresuan
- Suzerian: Maha Chakkraphat (1548–1564); Mahinthrathirat (1564–1569)
- Born: 1509
- Died: c. 30 June 1590 (aged 81) c. Saturday, 13th waning of Eighth Siamese month [Ashadha] of 952 CS; Ayutthaya
- Spouse: Wisutkasat
- Issue: Suphankanlaya; Naresuan; Ekathotsarot
Regnal name
- Sanphet I of Ayutthaya (Note: The full regnal name was Somdet Phra Chao Sanphet Wong Kurasuriyakhodom Borommarachathirat Rames Pariwet Thammikarat Dechochai Phromthepadi Thep Naru Badin Phuminthra Thep Sommot Ratcha Borommaphopit Phra Phuttha Chao Yu Hua); Maha Thammaracha V of Sukhothai-Phitsanulok (Note: The full regnal name was Somdet Phra Maha Thammarachathiratchao)
- Dynasty: Sukhothai

Maha Thammaracha (Note: Thai: มหาธรรมราชา, pronounced [mā.hǎː tʰām.mā.rāː.t͡ɕʰāː], Mahādharmarājā , Burmese: မဟာဓမ္မရာဇာ), Maha Thammarachathirat (Note: Thai: มหาธรรมราชาธิราช, Mahādharmarājādhirāja), or Sanphet I (Note: Thai: สรรเพชญ์ที่ ๑), formerly known as Khun Phirenthorathep (Note: Old Thai: ขุนพิเรนเทพ; Modern Thai: ขุนพิเรนทรเทพ), was King of Ayutthaya from the Sukhothai dynasty, ruling from 1569 to 1590. As a powerful Sukhothai noble, Phirenthorathep gradually rose to power. After playing many political turns, he was eventually crowned as King of Ayutthaya.

== Sukhothai noble ==
Before his ascension to the throne, Maha Thammaracha was known as Khun Phirenthorathep or "Okya Phitsanulok" (ออกญาพิษณุโลก, okya being a high-ranking noble title conferred by the king). He descended from the Phra Ruang dynasty of the Sukhothai Kingdom, which had been under Ayutthaya's influence as a tributary state since 1438. It was however not simply annexed, but its area—now known as the "northern cities" (Mueang Nuea)—continued to be ruled by local aristocrats under Ayutthayan overlordship within the "mandala" model. During the reign of Borommatrailokkanat (1448–1488) however, the power of Sukhothai lords was reduced. Phitsanulok, then the most important of the "northern cities", was subsequently ruled by Uparajas (viceroys), the designated heirs to the throne of Ayutthaya. King Chairachathirat (1534–1546), who before his ascension to the throne of Ayutthaya had resided as Uparaja in Phitsanulok, centralised the administration even further, abolishing the quasi-autonomous rule of Uparajas and summoning members of the old Sukhothai nobility to serve at his court in Ayutthaya.

Khun Phirenthorathep was one of the Sukhothai nobles brought to the court of Ayutthaya by Chairachathirat, who appointed him as head of the royal guard. In 1548, the kingdom fell under the governance of Worawongsathirat and Chairachathirat's widow Si Sudachan of the Uthong dynasty. Since the establishment of the kingdom of Ayutthaya, the Uthong (also known as "Lavo-Ayutthaya") dynasty and the Suphannaphum dynasty (to which King Chairachathirat belonged) had competed for power and fought over the throne. The Uthong clan rose to power at the expense of other clans. Khun Phirenthorathep then sought alliance with Sri Thamnakorn clan led by Khun Inthrawongse and staged a coup against Worawongsathirat and Si Sudachan in 1548, restoring the throne to Suphannaphum dynasty, namely King Maha Chakkraphat.

In gratitude for putting him on the throne, Maha Chakkraphat made Khun Phirenthorathep ruler of Phitsanulok and conferred him the semiroyal title of Maha Thammaracha. This was in line with the reigning name of Sukhothai kings in the 14th century. Maha Thammaracha enjoyed a great power and may be referred to as a viceroy of the northern provinces. He married Maha Chakkraphat's daughter, Sawatdirat (later Queen Wisutkasat).

== Ruler of Phitsanulok ==
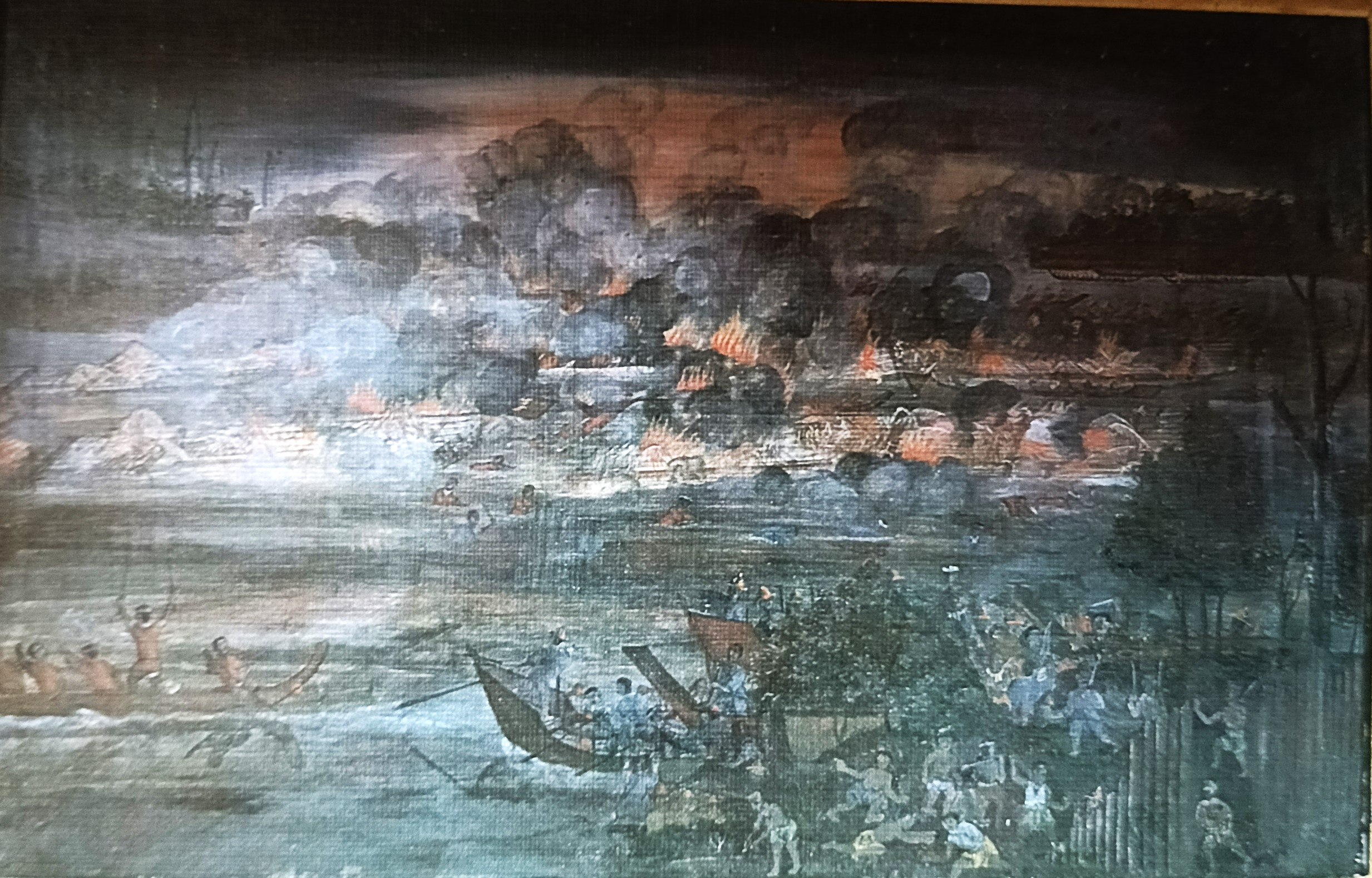
Maha Thammaracha releasing rafts of fire to destroy the Ayutthaya army during the siege of Phitsanulok in 1568. Painting by Nai Suk, commissioned by King Chulalongkorn in 1887.

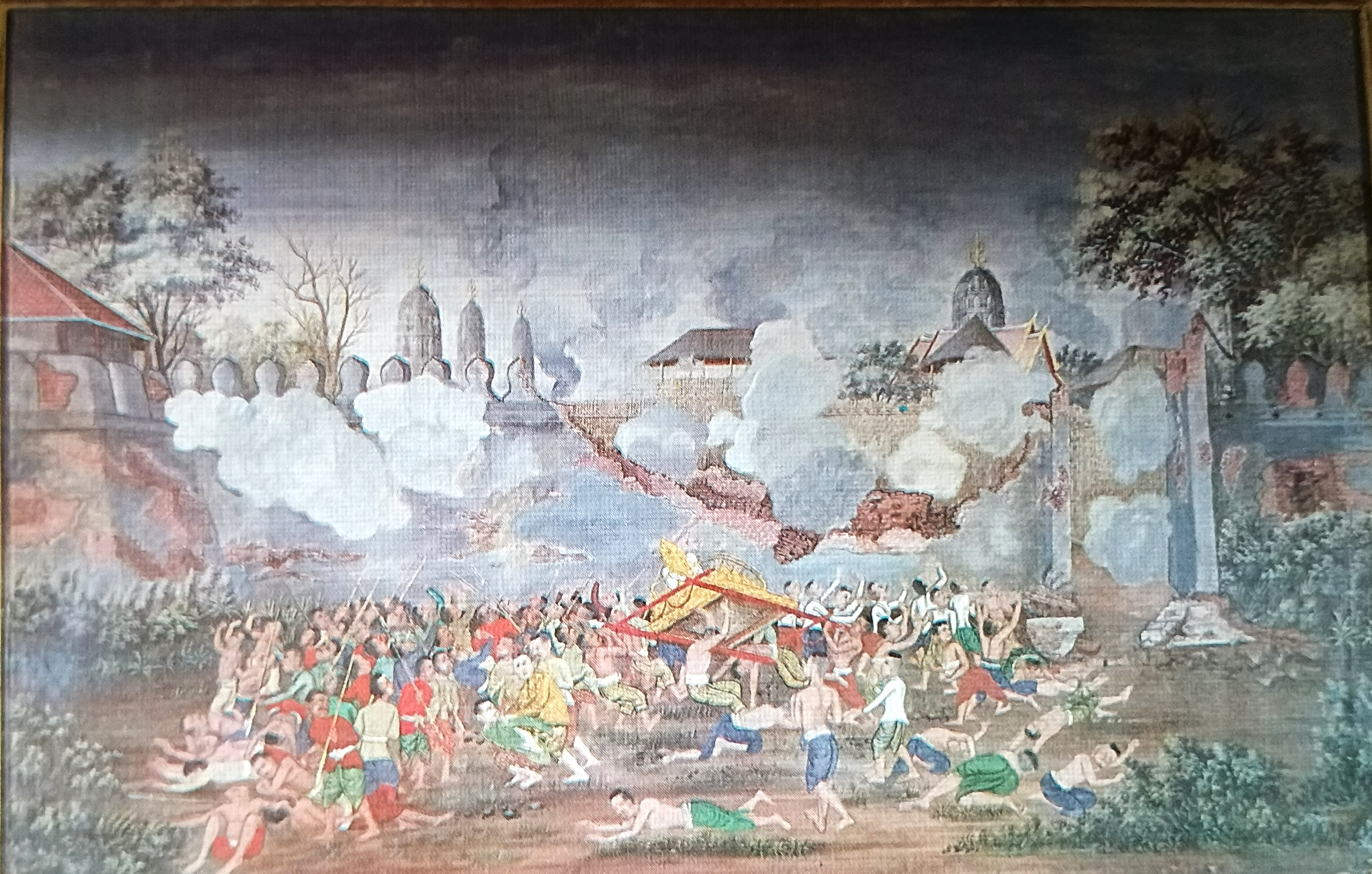
Maha Thammaracha, acting as a representative of King Bayinnaung, offered to negotiate a settlement during the siege of Ayutthaya by the Hanthawaddy army in 1568. However, he was met with strong resistance and gunfire from the Ayutthaya army under the command of Phra Maha Thep, who refused to negotiate. Painting by Nai Im, commissioned by King Chulalongkorn in 1887.

In 1548, King Tabinshwehti of Pegu led Burmese forces and invaded Ayutthaya in the Burmese–Siamese War of 1547–49. The Siamese managed to force a retreat upon the Burmese. However, the Siamese armies under Prince Ramesuan the Uparaja and Maha Thammarachathirat were ambushed and the two captured. They were released when Maha Chakkrapat paid the ransom of two male war elephants.

In 1563, Tabinshwehti's successor, Bayinnaung, led the massive Burmese armies to invade Siam. He laid siege on Phitsanulok. Maha Thammarachathirat offered "stout resistance", but surrendered and submitted after all food was gone and a smallpox epidemic spread. He submitted to Bayinnaung on 2 January 1564. (Note: (Damrong 2001: 36): Sunday, 5th waning of the second Siamese month in the year of the pig: i.e. Sunday, 5th waning of Pausha 925 CS = Sunday, 2 January 1564)

Maha Thammarachathirat had to send his sons Naresuan and Ekathotsarot to Pegu as a captives. With his son in Burmese captivity, Maha Thammarachathirat was forced to ally himself with Bayinnaung.

Mahinthrathirat—son of Maha Chakkraphat—then sought alliance with King Setthathirat of Lan Xang to fight Bayinnaung and Maha Thammarachathirat. In 1566, during Maha Thammarachathirat's absence from Phitsanulok to Pegu, Mahinthrathirat brought his sister Queen Wisutkasat and her sons and daughters to Ayutthaya. Maha Thammarachathirat sought help from Bayinnaung.

In 1568, Bayinnaung marched large Burmese armies to Ayutthaya with support from Maha Thammarachathirat. Ayutthaya finally fell in 1569 and Maha Thammarachathirat was installed as King of Ayutthaya. Bayinnaung bestowed him the reigning name Sanphet I. The date of appointment was 29 September 1569. (Note: Date per Burmese chronicles (Maha Yazawin Vol. 2 2006: 324) and (Hmannan Vol. 2 2003: 419): 5th waning of Thadingyut 931 ME (29 September 1569). (Damrong 2001: 63) says he became king on Friday, 6th waxing of the 12th Siamese month of 931 CS, which translates to 14 October 1569. However, according to the Burmese chronicles, Friday, 6th waxing of Tazaungmon 931 ME (14 October 1569) was the date on which Bayinnaung left Ayutthaya for Phitsanulok to begin the Lan Xang campaign.)

== King of Ayutthaya ==
Maha Thammarachathirat asked Bayinnaung to return his sons Naresuan and Ekathotsarot to Ayutthaya in exchange for his daughter Suphankanlaya as Bayinnaung's secondary wife in 1571. Maha Thammarachathirat made Naresuan the King of Phitsanulok and Uparaja in 1569. Ayutthaya kingdom under Maha Thammarachathirat was tributary to Burma.

=== Cambodian invasions ===
In 1570, Barom Reachea III the King of Longvek marched his Cambodian armies to Ayutthaya and laid siege on the city but failed. In 1574, under the request from Pegu, Maha Thammaracha led the Siamese armies to subjugate Vientiane. The Cambodians took this opportunity to invade Siam but was also repelled.

In 1578, the Cambodians invaded Khorat and proceeded further to Saraburi. Naresuan sent Siamese armies to ambush the Cambodians at Chaibadan, halting the invaders from reaching Ayutthaya.

=== Break from Pegu ===
In 1581, Bayinnaung died, succeeded by his son Nanda Bayin. In 1583, the Lord of Ava and the Shans staged a rebellion against Pegu. Nanda Bayin then requested for troops from Ayutthaya. The Siamese armies went slowly to Ava under leadership of Naresuan. Naresuan then renounced loyalty to Pegu in 1584.

In 1584, Nanda Bayin himself led the Peguan armies into Siam but was defeated by Naresuan. For many years the Burmese armies surged into Ayutthaya but was repelled. Maha Thammarachathirat died c. 30 June 1590. (Note: (Damrong 2001: 116): Naresuan became king on Sunday, the 13th waning of the eighth Siamese month [Ashadha] of the year of the tiger, 952 CS, which translates to Saturday, 30 June 1590. Maha Thammarachathirat might have died on 30 June 1590 and Naresuan became king the next day, on Sunday, 1 July 1590.) He was succeeded by Naresuan.

== Bibliography ==
- Damrong Rajanubhab (1928). Chris Baker (ed.). Our Wars with the Burmese: Thai–Burmese Conflict 1539–1767. Translated by Aung Thein (2001 ed.). Bangkok: White Lotus. ISBN 974-7534-58-4.
- U Kala (1724). Maha Yazawin (in Burmese). Vol. 1–3 (2006, 4th printing ed.). Yangon: Ya-Pyei Publishing.
- Royal Historical Commission of Burma (1832). Hmannan Yazawin (in Burmese). Vol. 1–3 (2003 ed.). Yangon: Ministry of Information, Myanmar.

Maha Thammaracha (king of Ayutthaya) Sukhothai Dynasty Born: 1509 Died: c. 30 June 1590
Regnal titles
| Preceded by Mahinthrathirat as sovereign king | King of Ayutthaya; 29 September 1569 – c. 30 June 1590 (after 1584 as sovereign king) | Succeeded by Naresuan |
