= Thep Kasattri =

Consort of King of Setthathirath and King Bayinnaung

- Princess of Ayutthaya
- Spouse: Setthathirath
- Dynasty: Suphannaphum (by birth); Khun Lo (by marriage)
- Father: Maha Chakkraphat
- Mother: Suriyothai

Thep Kasattri (Thai: เทพกษัตรีย์) or Thep Kasat Chao (Thai: เทพกษัตรเจ้า), Siamese princess, was the fifth child and third daughter of King Maha Chakkraphat and Queen Suriyothai. She married the King of Lan Xang, Setthathirath.
