= Burmese–Siamese War (1563–1564) =

War between the Toungoo Dynasty of Burma and the Ayutthaya Kingdom of Siam

- Part of Burmese–Siamese wars
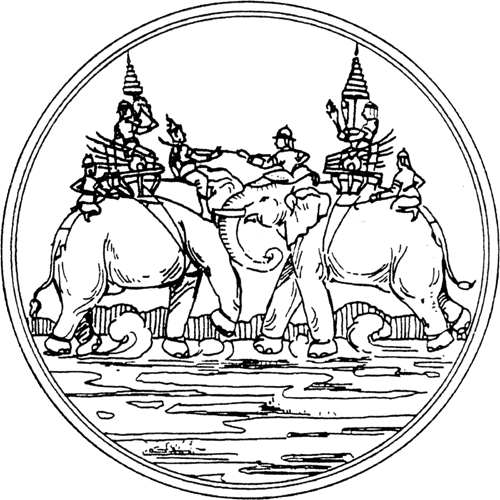
- War elephants depicted from a later Siam–Burmese war. White war elephants such as these were the purported casus belli for the 1563–64 war.
Date	1563–1564
Location	Ayutthaya, Phitsanulok, Sukhothai
Result	Burmese victory

Belligerents
Ayutthaya Kingdom (Siam)	Toungoo Empire: Sukhothai Kingdom; Lan Na Kingdom; Longvek Kingdom

Commanders and leaders
Maha Chakkraphat (POW); Prince Ramesuan (POW); Mahinthrathirat; Phraya Chakri (POW); Phraya Sunthorn Songkhram (POW)	High King Bayinnaung; Thado Minsaw of Ava; Binnya Dala; Baraminreachea (Crown Prince)

Units involved
Royal Siamese Army; Portuguese mercenaries Luzon mercenaries	Royal Burmese Army; Royal Sukhothai Army; Royal Lanna Army; Portuguese mercenaries Luzon mercenaries Cambodian Army (Raid on Ayutthaya)

Strength
70,000	Burmese sources: 60,000+ men 2,400 horses 360 elephants Thai sources: 120,000+ men

Casualties and losses
Heavy	Heavy but few than Ayutthaya

The Burmese-Siamese War of 1563–1564, also known as the War over the White Elephants (Burmese: ဆင်ဖြူတော်စစ်ပွဲ), was a war between the Toungoo dynasty of Burma and the Ayutthaya Kingdom of Siam. It was the second of twenty wars fought between the Burmese and Siamese that lasted well into the 19th century. The cause of the war was an attempt by the Toungoo king Bayinnaung to force the Ayutthaya kingdom into submission under his rule, as part of his campaign that later created the largest empire ever to exist in Southeast Asia. 13 years into Bayinnaung's reign, his second attempt at invasion of Siam and first as king succeeded after an extensive siege of the city of Ayutthaya. Siam became a vassal of the Toungoo dynasty, this status lasting until a 1568 revolt by Ayutthaya resulting in a short-lived independence.

== Prelude to conflict ==
Following the 1547–49 war with the Toungoo, Ayutthaya king Maha Chakkraphat built up his capital city's defenses in preparation for a later war with the Burmese. The 1547–49 war ended in a Siamese defensive victory and preserved Siamese independence. However, Bayinnaung's territorial ambitions prompted Chakkraphat to prepare for another invasion. These preparations included a census that prepared all able men to go to war. Arms and livestock were taken by the government in preparation for a large-scale war effort, and seven white elephants were captured by Chakkraphat for good luck. News of the Ayutthayan king's preparation spread quickly, eventually reaching the Burmese.

Meanwhile, an attack on the city of Chiang Mai in the nearby Lan Na kingdom by Bayinnaung succeeded in taking the city in 1556. Subsequent efforts left most of northern Siam under Burmese control. This successful invasion resulted in Bayinnaung being given the nickname "Conqueror of Ten Directions". This left Chakkraphat's kingdom in a precarious position, faced with enemy territory to the north and the west.

== Invasion ==
=== Initial invasion ===
Bayinnaung, with his quick rise to power and influence, subsequently demanded two of King Chakkraphat's white elephants as tribute to the rising Toungoo Dynasty. Chakkraphat refused, leading to Burma's second invasion of the Ayutthaya Kingdom.

Bayinnaung left Bago on 27 December 1563 and marched his force to Mottama. There, he organized his army into 5 divisions. King Bayinnaung, familiar with the terrain of Siam due to his prior expeditions with the late Tabinshwehti, entered Siam through what is now known as Three Pagodas Pass in Kanchanaburi Province. A separate Burmese army entered through Mae Lamao Pass in what is now Tak Province.

The Siamese forces started the defense of Ayutthaya, with Phraya Chakri commanding 15,000 men to the Lumphli Fortress in the north of Ayutthaya, Chao Phraya Mahasena commanding 10,000 men to the Ban Dokmai Han Tra Fortress in the east, Phraya Phra Khlang commanding 10,000 men to guard the south, and Phra Sunthorn Songkhram commanding 10,000 men to set up at Jampa Fortress in the west.

However, the Siamese army was surprised that the Burmese had launched a two-pronged attack as they were expecting the Burmese to only attack from the Three Pagoda Pass.

=== Capture of Phitsanulok ===
Bayinnaung's army consisted of 60,000 men, 2,400 horses, 360 elephants, and another army from Lan Na These forces marched towards the capital city Ayutthaya, but first faced forces at the city of Phitsanulok. The governor of Phitsanulok, Mahathammarachathirat initially resisted the Burmese attacks as the Burmese surrounded the city. However, seeing the hopelessness of the situation, dwindling supplies, and a smallpox outbreak, Mahathammarachathirat surrendered on 20 February 1563.

=== Battle at Chai Nat ===
After learning that Bayinnaung had brought the Burmese Royal Army down from the Hua Mueang Nuea with Siamese recruits, Chakkraphat ordered an army to be raised. Phraya Phichai Ronnarit and Phraya Wichit Narong were sent to set up camp at Nakhon Sawan while Prince Ramesuan's main army was to help relieve the siege of Phitsanulok. However, after learning that Phitsanulok had fallen, Prince Ramesuan decided to set up camp at Chai Nat to stop the Burmese advance. The Siamese forces used cannons on ships to blast at the Burmese army, causing many casualties. Bayinnaung later commanded the Burmese riverine fleet under Thado Dhamma Yaza I of Prome to attack the Siamese. As the Siamese were heavily outnumbered, they retreated back to Ayutthaya.

== Siege of Ayutthaya ==
=== Siege of Ayutthaya ===
When Bayinnaung arrived at Ayutthaya, Chakkraphat ordered the Siamese navy to attack the Burmese, however, this force was defeated and the Siamese suffered heavy losses and the warships retreated back into Ayutthaya. There, they were kept at bay for weeks by the Siamese fort, aided by three Portuguese warships and artillery batteries at the harbor. The invaders finally captured the Portuguese ships and batteries on 7 February 1564, after which the fort promptly fell. Bayinnaung was able to capture Lumphli, Jampa, and Ban Dokmai Han Tra Fortresses, surrounding Ayutthaya from three sides. In the west, the forces of Thado Dhamma Yaza were stationed at Thung Wat Photharam, planning to advance on Khlong Ko Kaeo, in the north, the army of Nanda Bayin was stationed at Thung Phaniat, the royal army of Bayinnaung was stationed at the fields of Wat Pho Phueak near Khanon Pak Khu, the Lord of Pyay's army was stationed at Thung Lumphli, the Lord of Taungoo was stationed at Thung Prachet, while Thado Minsaw of Ava moved down to the south towards Phutthaisawan Temple.

As the Burmese forces were too numerically superior, Chakkraphat didn't dare march his army out to meet the Burmese in pitched battle and relied on his warships shelling the Burmese army. The Burmese responded by shelling the walls of Ayutthaya. With a now 60,000 strong force combined with the Phitsanulok army, Bayinnaung reached Ayutthaya's city walls, heavily bombarding the city. Although superior in strength, the Burmese were not able to capture Ayutthaya, but demanded that the Siamese king come out of the city under a flag of truce for peace negotiations. Seeing that his citizens could not take the siege much longer, Chakkraphat negotiated peace, but at a high price.

== Siamese surrender terms ==
In exchange for the retreat of the Burmese army, Bayinnaung took Prince Ramesuan (Chakkraphat's son), Phraya Chakri, and Phraya Sunthorn Songkhram back with him to Burma as a hostage, and four Siamese white elephants. Mahathamraja, although a betrayer, was to be left as ruler of Phitsanulok and viceroy of Siam. The Ayutthaya Kingdom became a vassal of the Toungoo dynasty, required to give thirty elephants and three hundred catties of silver to the Burmese yearly. The Burmese were also to be granted access to collect taxes at the port of Mergui, then Siamese territory. Bayinnaung's demand of two white elephants was increased to four. A peace treaty was signed at Wat Na Phra Men (Monastery in Front of the Funeral Pyre). Chakkraphat's accedence to Bayinnaung's demands led to a four-year peace.

Burmese sources say that when Bayinnaung returned to Pegu, he also took Maha Chakkraphat back with him as a hostage, before appointing Mahinthrathirat, a son of Maha Chakkraphat, as vassal king of Ayutthaya, and leaving a garrison of 3,000. Burmese sources continue to say that after having been sent to Pegu for years, Maha Chakkraphat became a monk and Bayinnaung allowed him to return to Ayutthaya. Thai sources, however, merely say that Mahinthrathirat, the second son of Maha Chakkraphat, ascended the throne because his father abdicated and became a monk after this war.

Bayinnaung also asked for 4 white elephants alongside Ramesuan, Phraya Chakri and Phra Sunthorn Songkhram as hostages. He also demanded 30 elephants and 300 bahts of silver be sent per year.

== Aftermath ==
The peace did not last long. In 1568, the Ayutthayans revolted against their Burmese rulers. After advice by Mahathamraja that the Ayutthaya kingdom was too weak to sustain a revolt, Bayinnaung again led Burmese armies into Ayutthaya, resulting in another war with the Siamese.

== See also ==
- Burmese–Siamese wars
- Burma–Thailand relations
