= Thado Dhamma Yaza I of Prome =

Thado Dhamma Yaza I သတိုးဓမ္မရာဇာ Thado Thu

Grand Prince of Prome
- Reign: 30 April 1550 – 30 August 1551
- Predecessor: Minkhaung (as king)
- Successor: Thado Dhamma Yaza II

Viceroy of Prome
- Reign: 19 May 1542 – 30 April 1550
- Born: c. 1490s Toungoo (Taungoo)
- Died: 30 August 1551; Sunday, 1st waxing of Thadingyut 913 ME (Note: Chronicles (Hmannan Vol. 2 2003: 268) say that he was executed after Prome's defenses were breached on New Moon of Tawthalin 913 ME (29 August 1551) at 2 o'clock at night. Since nightly 2 o'clock in traditional Burmese time means midnight, he was killed the next day.); Prome (Pyay)
- Issue: Khin Myat
- House: Toungoo
- Father: Lord of Kyet-Yo-Bin
- Religion: Theravada Buddhism

Thado Dhamma Yaza I (Burmese: သတိုးဓမ္မရာဇာ, pronounced [ðədó dəma̰ jàzà]; c. 1490s–1551) was viceroy of Prome (Pyay) from 1542 to 1550 during the reign of his son-in-law King Tabinshwehti of Toungoo Dynasty of Burma (Myanmar), and the self-proclaimed king of the city-state from 1550 to 1551. After the death of Tabinshwehti in 1550, the man who started out as a royal household servant of Tabinshwehti in 1516 declared himself king of Prome with the style of Thado Thu (သတိုးသူ, [ðədó θù]), and did not submit to Bayinnaung, Tabinshwehti's chosen successor. His fortified city-state fell to Bayinnaung's forces in 1551 after a six-month battle. He was executed on the order of Bayinnaung, who later regretted the decision.

In Thai history, he is identified as the commander who slew Queen Suriyothai on her war elephant during the first Burmese invasion of Siam.

== Early life ==
The future lord of Prome was a commoner named Shin Nita (ရှင်နီတာ). His father was Lord of Kyet-Yo-Bin, a small town. In April 1516 he was selected to be one of the seven royal servants assigned to Prince Tabinshwehti of Toungoo. He and his family moved into Toungoo Palace precincts where he and other staff, who also consisted of Mingyi Swe and Shin Myo Myat, attended to the crown prince throughout his childhood and youth. The prince in turn had a deep affection and appreciation for his staff. When he became king in November 1530, the 14-year-old king handed out lavish awards and titles to his childhood staff. The new king took two of his childhood playmates, Khin Hpone Soe (daughter of Swe) and Khin Mya (daughter of Nita) as his queens, and awarded both of his fathers-in-law royal titles. Nita was now a royal with the style of Thado Dhamma Yaza.

== Viceroy of Prome ==
=== Road to viceroyalty ===
In the next two decades, his career would track the fortunes of Toungoo, and the former commoner would enter the Burmese and Thai history books. From 1534 to 1549, Tabinshwehti and his deputy Bayinnaung, the eldest son of Mingyi Swe, would bring war to all their neighboring kingdoms and build the largest polity in Burma since the fall of Pagan Empire in 1287. But the main contribution of Thado Dhamma Yaza (and that of his longtime colleague Mingyi Swe) was not military leadership. (Note: Neither man appeared to have had any meaningful military experience or training. (Sein Lwin Lay 2006: 109): Chronicles only speak of Tabinshwehti, Bayinnaung and other young men at the palace receiving an extensive military education throughout their youth.) Though Thado Dhamma Yaza did command a regiment in the 1538–39 campaign, his main role, like Mingyi Swe's, was to help administer the kingdom while the king and his armies were out on their annual campaigns. He was twice entrusted to guard the capital Pegu (Bago) during the 1540–1541 campaign against Martaban (Mottama) and during the 1541–1542 campaign against Prome (Pyay).

Then in May 1542, Toungoo forces conquered Prome, and the king appointed Thado Dhamma Yaza viceroy of the strategically important city. It was only the third viceroyship appointment (after Mingyi Swe at Toungoo in 1540 and Saw Lagun Ein at Martaban in 1541) by the king, who placed only his most trusted men at key strategic cities. Indeed, Prome remained a contested city. In the following dry season (1543–1544), the city came under a massive attack by the Confederation of Shan States. Though Toungoo forces fought off the invasion, the city remained on constant guard. When Toungoo forces invaded Arakan in 1546–47, he remained at Prome to guard the rear. (Mingyi Swe also remained at Toungoo for the same reason.)

=== Siamese campaign ===
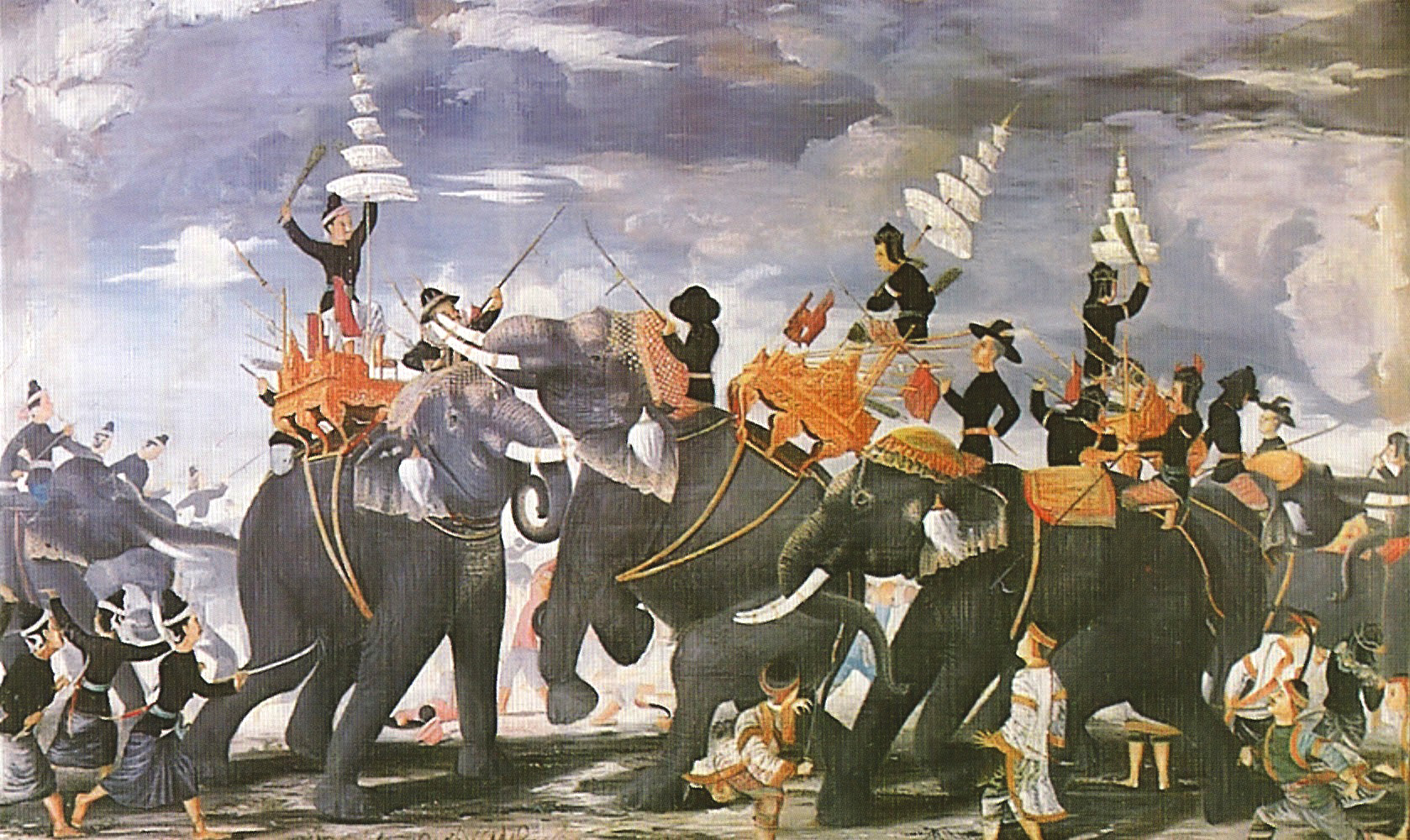
A Thai painting depicting Queen Suriyothai (center) on her war elephant putting herself between King Maha Chakkraphat (right) and Thado Dhamma Yaza (left).

In 1548, however, both Thado Dhamma Yaza and Mingyi Swe were asked to join in the invasion of Siam. At the start of the invasion, the two viceroys commanded a regiment each in the rearguard army. (The vanguard and main armies were commanded by Bayinnaung and Tabinshwehti respectively.) But the rearguard men were soon to see action. Thado Dhamma Yaza was featured prominently in two of the major battles reported in the Burmese chronicles. In the first battle, which took place near the Siamese capital of Ayutthaya, possibly at Intaburi, the Burmese command placed Thado Dhamma Yaza's army as a decoy while the two main armies lurked on the right and left flanks. The Siamese forces led by their king himself rushed to attack. Thado Dhamma Yaza allowed the Siamese army to press on, enabling Bayainnaung's army to encircle the vanguard of the Siamese army, which was subsequently wiped out. According to Siamese sources, Thado Dhamma Yaza cut down a disguised Queen Suriyothai, who on her war elephant rushed in front of her husband the king's elephant, to receive the blow which severed her from shoulder to heart. (Note: (Harvey 1925: 159) citing J. Taylor Jones's 1836–38 publication of "Chinese Repository" Vol. 5, Chapter: "Siamese History". p. 162.) However, this incident is not found in any of the Burmese chronicles. (Note: Chronicles (Maha Yazawin Vol. 2 2006: 181–192) and (Hmannan Vol. 2 2003: 238–248) devote a detailed account of the invasion, down to the names of war elephants the high royalty rode on. Thado Dhamma Yaza rode the war elephant named Ye Htut Mingala (Hmannan Vol. 2 2033: 244). If he was victorious in combat against any enemy of significance, such a story with a favorable outcome would likely have been included in the chronicles.)

The second battle in which he had a prominent role took place near Kamphaeng Phet c. February 1549. The Burmese forces had been forced to retreat after an unsuccessful month-long siege at Ayutthaya, and had also failed to take Kamphaeng Phet, a fortified town on the route of retreat. The battle ensued when Siamese armies came out of fortifications to follow up on the retreating invaders, who in turn stopped to engage the pursuers. In that battle, Thado Dhamma Yaza was entrusted to command an army (1500 men, 300 horses, 50 elephants) that guarded the right flank. The Burmese won the battle and captured two of the most senior Siamese princes. It turned out to be the last battle of the war as the Burmese negotiated a safe retreat in exchange for the return of the princes and other prisoners of war.

== King of Prome ==
Just over a year after the Siamese campaign, on 30 April 1550, King Tabinshwehti was assassinated by one of his advisers. Instead of submitting to Tabinshwehti's chosen successor Bayinnaung, vassal rulers of major regions as well as those of small remote towns all declared themselves independent. The kingdom Tabinshwehti had arduously built up in the previous 16 years appeared ruined. Thado Dhamma Yaza was no exception. He declared himself king of Prome, with the style of Thado Thu.

His rule was brief. Nine months into his reign, he came under Bayinnaung's crosshairs. On 11 January 1551, Bayinnaung captured his ancestral city of Toungoo from his own brother, and picked Prome as his next target. In March 1551, (Note: The chronicle Maha Yazawin (Maha Yazawin Vol. 2 2006: 202) gives Friday, 8th waxing of Late Tagu 912 ME as the date when the Prome campaign began. The date (though not the day of the week) was corrected by later chronicles Yazawin Thit and Hmannan Yazawin (Hmannan Vol. 2 2003: 266) as Friday, 2nd waxing of Late Tagu 912 ME. Both dates are slightly off with respective to the day of the week given: Hmannan's 2nd waxing of Late Tagu 912 ME translates to Sunday, (not Friday), 8 March 1551 while Maha Yazawin's 8th waxing of Late Tagu 912 ME translates to Saturday (not Friday), 14 March 1551.) Bayinnaung's armies (9000 troops, 300 horses, 25 elephants) attacked the city but Prome's musket and artillery fire repelled repeated enemy charges. On 19 June 1551, (Note: Both Maha Yazawin and Hmannan chronicles give Wednesday, 2nd waning of Waso 913 ME, which actually translates to Friday, 19 June 1551.) Bayinnaung's forces retreated. But the relief was temporary. Bayinnaung returned with another army of similar strength (made up of fresh recruits from central Burma) on 21 August 1551. (Note: Chronicles give as Thursday, 6th waning of Tawthalin 913 ME, which was Friday, 21 August 1551.) They attacked the city after hours on 29 August 1551. The city's defenses were breached around midnight by a battalion led by Minkhaung II, who is said to have forced the break-through by ramming his war elephant through a broken part of the wooden gates of the wall. Thado Dhamma Yaza tried to flee the scene but was captured. When Bayinnaung found out that Thado Dhamma Yaza was preparing to leave for Arakan, he ordered the execution right away. The king is said to have regretted the decision. He had known the former Shin Nita all his life, and the fallen pretender was like an uncle to him.

Bayinnaung then appointed his second eldest younger brother viceroy of Prome. The brother became known as Thado Dhamma Yaza II of Prome.

== Bibliography ==
- Harvey, G. E. (1925). History of Burma: From the Earliest Times to 10 March 1824. London: Frank Cass & Co. Ltd.
- Kala, U (2006) [1724]. Maha Yazawin (in Burmese). Vol. 1–3 (4th printing ed.). Yangon: Ya-Pyei Publishing.
- Phayre, Lt. Gen. Sir Arthur P. (1967) [1883]. History of Burma. London: Susil Gupta.
- Royal Historical Commission of Burma (2003) [1832]. Hmannan Yazawin (in Burmese). Vol. 1–3. Yangon: Ministry of Information, Myanmar.
- Sein Lwin Lay, Kahtika U (2006) [1968]. Min Taya Shwe Hti and Bayinnaung: Ketumadi Taungoo Yazawin (in Burmese) (2nd printing ed.). Yangon: Yan Aung Sarpay.

Thado Dhamma Yaza I of Prome Toungoo Dynasty Born: c. 1490s Died: 30 August 1551
Regnal titles
Preceded by Minkhaung as King of Prome	Grand Prince of Prome; 19 May 1542 – 30 August 1551	Succeeded by Thado Dhamma Yaza II as Viceroy of Prome
