= Mahinthrathirat =

King of Ayutthaya in 1569

Mahinthrathirat มหินทราธิราช

King of Ayutthaya
- Reign: 15 April 1569 – 2 August 1569
- Predecessor: Thianracha
- Successor: Maha Thammaracha (as tributary king)

Tributary King of Ayutthaya
- Reign: 18 February 1564 – before 12 May 1568
- Predecessor: Thianracha
- Successor: Thianracha (as sovereign king)
- Emperor: Bayinnaung
- Born: 1539
- Died: c. late 1569
Names
- Mahinthrathirat
- Dynasty: Suphannaphum
- Father: Thianracha
- Mother: Sri Suriyothai

Mahinthrathirat (Thai: มหินทราธิราช, pronounced [mā.hǐn.tʰa.rāː.tʰí.rât], Mahindrādhirāja; 1539–1569) was King of Ayutthaya from 1564 to 1568 and again in 1569. He ruled his first reign as a vassal of Toungoo Burma before restoring his father in 1568 as the sovereign king. He became king again in 1569 after his father's death during the Third Siege of Ayutthaya by Toungoo forces. Mahinthrathirat was the last monarch of the Suphannaphum Dynasty as the kingdom fell to the Burmese in 1569. Mahinthrathirat was known for his efforts to counter Burmese and Phitsanulok power by seeking alliance with Setthathirath of Lan Xang.

== A prince far from the throne ==
Prince Mahinthrathirat was a son of Maha Chakkraphat and Queen Suriyothai. Mahinthrathirat had an elder brother Prince Ramesuan the Uparaja - then heir to the throne. In 1548, Tabinshweti marched the Burmese armies to invade Ayutthaya. Mahinthrathirat joined his family to battle the Burmese. However, his mother Queen Sri Suriyothai was killed in battle.

== Wars with Bayinnaung ==
Bayinnaung, brother-in-law of Tabinshweti, led the Burmese to invade Ayutthaya again in 1563. Bayinnaung laid the siege on Ayutthaya in 1564, and installed Mahin as the vassal king on 18 February 1564. (Note: (Hmannan Vol. 2 2003: 355): Friday, 8th waxing of Tabaung 925 ME = 18 February 1564)

Maha Thammarachathirat, the King of Phitsanulok and Maha Chakkrapat's handful noble, had allied himself with Bayinnaung since the war of 1563. Maha Chakkrapat sought an alliance with Setthathirat of Lan Xang, through the marriage of his daughter Thepkasattri, but Maha Thammarachathirat informed Bayinnaung about the arranged marriage and alliances. Bayinnaung then kidnapped Thepkasatri on her way to Vientiane. This forced Maha Chakkrapat to abdicate the throne to his son Mahinthrathirat, who planned a joint-attack on Phitsanulok with Setthathirat. Following that failed attack, Mahinthrathirat urged his father to return to regal power in the ensuing crisis.

== Fall of Ayutthaya ==
Bayinnaung then led the Burmese armies against Ayutthaya with support from Maha Thammarachathirat. The Burmese laid siege to Ayutthaya, during which, Maha Chakkrapat fell ill and died (on 15 April 1569, according to the Burmese chronicles). (Note: (Yazawin Thit Vol. 2 2012: 249): Friday, 1st waxing of Kason 931 ME = 15 April 1569) Mahinthrathirat assumed the throne again. In spite of several months of efforts, Ayutthaya stood the siege. Bayinnaung then bribed Phraya Chakri, a captured Siamese general, to be a spy. Mahinthrathirat embraced the returned general with trust and appointed Phraya Chakri commander of the Siamese defenses. Phraya Chakri was able to place the less-trained and incompetent troops in the front of the Burmese attack, and thus were easily defeated. The city was taken on 2 August 1569, (Note: (Yazawin Thit Vol. 2 2012: 157): Tuesday, 6th waning of Wagaung 931 ME = 2 August 1569) after nine months.

Bayinnuang installed Maha Thammarachathirat as the King of Ayutthaya on 29 September 1569, (Note: Date per Burmese chronicles (Maha Yazawin Vol. 2 2006: 324) and (Hmannan Vol. 2 2003: 419): 5th waning of Thadingyut 931 ME (29 September 1569). (Damrong 2001: 63) says he became king on Friday, 6th waxing of the 12th Siamese month of 931 CS, which translates to 14 October 1569. However, according to the Burmese chronicles, Friday, 6th waxing of Tazaungmon 931 ME (14 October 1569) was the date on which Bayinnaung left Ayutthaya for Phitsanulok to begin the Lan Xang campaign.) tributary to Pegu. Mahinthrathirat along with his family and the nobility were captured and taken to Pegu. Mahinthrathirat died in the same year on the way.

== Bibliography ==
- Prince Damrong Rajanubhab (1928). Chris Baker (ed.). Our Wars with the Burmese: Thai–Burmese Conflict 1539–1767. Translated by Aung Thein (2001 ed.). Bangkok: White Lotus. ISBN 974-7534-58-4.
- Eade, J.C. (1989). Southeast Asian Ephemeris: Solar and Planetary Positions, A.D. 638–2000. Ithaca: Cornell University. ISBN 0-87727-704-4.
- Harvey, G. E. (1925). History of Burma: From the Earliest Times to 10 March 1824. London: Frank Cass & Co. Ltd.
- Kala, U (1724). Maha Yazawin (in Burmese). Vol. 1–3 (2006, 4th printing ed.). Yangon: Ya-Pyei Publishing.
- Maha Sithu (2012) [1798]. Kyaw Win; Thein Hlaing (eds.). Yazawin Thit (in Burmese). Vol. 1–3 (2nd printing ed.). Yangon: Ya-Pyei Publishing.
- Royal Historical Commission of Burma (1832). Hmannan Yazawin (in Burmese). Vol. 1–3 (2003 ed.). Yangon: Ministry of Information, Myanmar.

Mahinthrathirat House of Suphannaphum Born: 1539 Died: 1569
Regnal titles
Preceded by Maha Chakkraphat	King of Ayutthaya; First Reign; 18 February 1564 – before 12 May 1568	Succeeded by Maha Chakkrapat as sovereign king
Preceded by Maha Chakkrapat	King of Ayutthaya; Second Reign; 15 April 1569 – 2 August 1569	Succeeded by Maha Thammaracha as vassal king
Vacant Title last held by Ramesuan	Viceroy of Ayutthaya; First Time; 1564–1568	Vacant Title next held by Himself
Vacant Title last held by Himself	Viceroy of Ayutthaya; Second Time; 1568–1569	Vacant Title next held by Naresuan
