= Wisut Kasattri =

Wisut Kasattri วิสุทธิกษัตรีย์
- Queen consort of Ayutthaya
- Spouse: Maha Thammaracha
- Issue: Suphankanlaya; Naresuan; Ekathotsarot
- Dynasty: Suphannaphum (by birth); Sukhothai (by marriage)
- Father: Maha Chakkraphat
- Mother: Suriyothai

Wisut Kasattri (Thai: วิสุทธิกษัตรีย์, Visuddhikṣatrīya) or Borommathewi (บรมเทวี) was a princess and later queen consort during the Ayutthaya period in the 16th century, born Sawatdiratchathida (สวัสดิราชธิดา) to Prince Thianracha (later King Maha Chakkraphat) and Suriyothai. She was the mother of two kings, Naresuan the Great and Ekathotsarot, and served as the matriarch of the Sukhothai dynasty, which ruled the Ayutthaya Kingdom from 1569 to 1629.

== Life ==
In 1548 she married Maha Thammaracha, a cousin on her mother's side. He was made Lord of Phitsanulok, soon after helping Maha Chakkraphat to the throne through a palace coup. She bore Thammaracha three children, two sons: Phra Naretsuan born in 1555, Phra Ekathotsarot (both became Kings) and one daughter Phra Suphankanlaya.

In 1563, King Bayinnaung of Burma invaded Siam. The city of Phitsanulok was forced to surrender and her husband switched his allegiance from her father to his enemy. In 1566, she took part in the kidnapping of her younger sister Phra Thepkassattri, who was betrothed to King Setthathirath of Lan Xang, in order to thwart an attempted alliance between Ayutthaya and Laos against her husband.

Chakkraphat and Mahinthrathirat then marched to Phitsanouk while Thammaracha was away, and took Wisutkasat and her children to Ayutthaya as hostages. Following the Burmese-Siamese War (1568–1569), her husband ascended the throne with the help of Bayinnaung as King Maha Thammarachathirat or Sanphet I, and together they became the founders of the Sukhothai Dynasty.

Wisut Kasattri House of Suphannaphum Born: ? Died: ?
Thai royalty
Vacant Title last held by Suriyothai	Queen Consort of Ayutthaya; 1569–1590	Succeeded by Mani Rattana
