= Maha Chakkraphat =

King of Ayutthaya from 1548 to 1564

Maha Chakkraphat มหาจักรพรรดิ
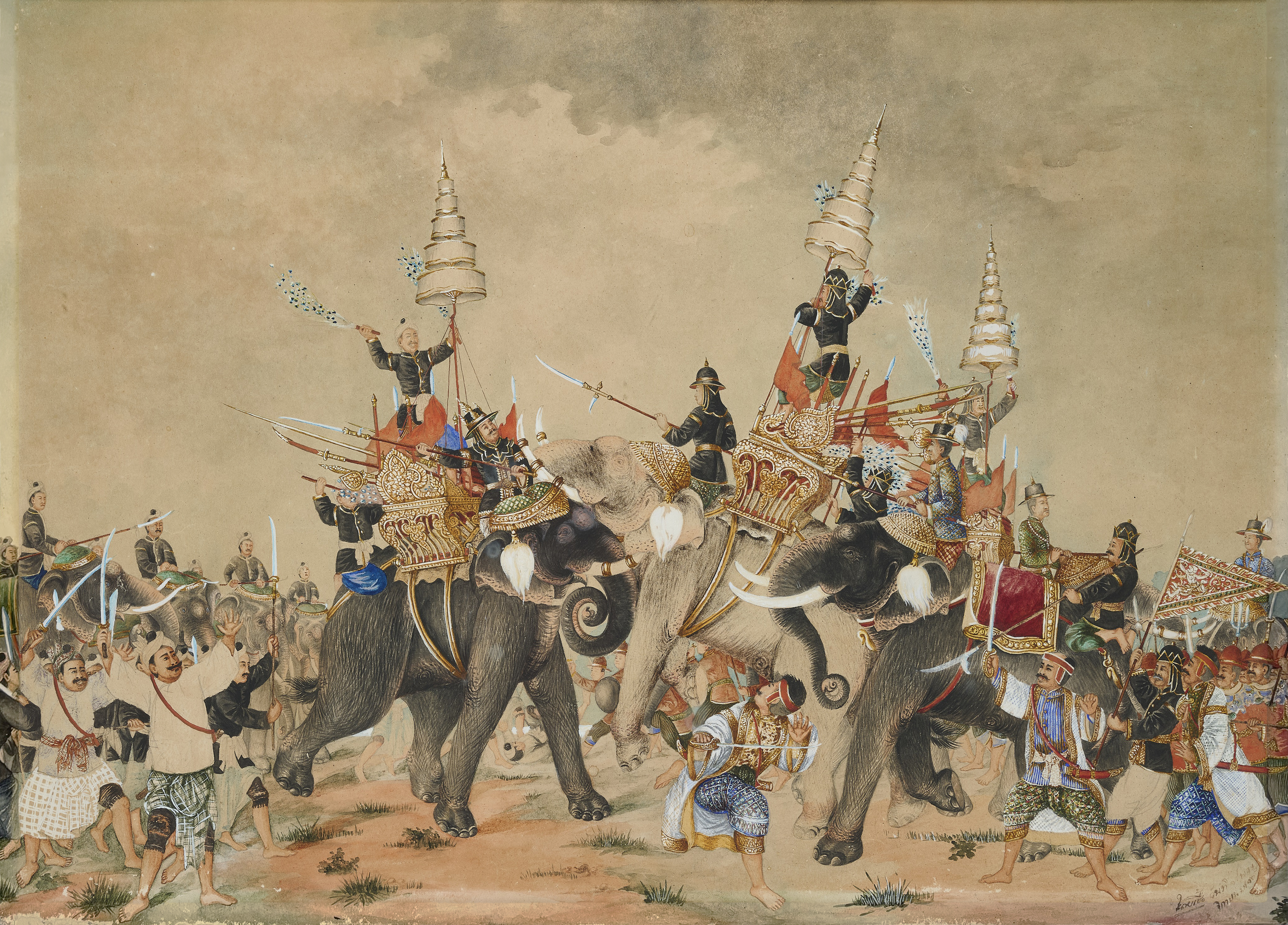
- A painting depicting the elephant duel between the Viceroy of Prome (left) and King Maha Chakkraphat of Ayutthaya (right), during which Queen Suriyothai (center) places her elephant between the two combatants during the Burmese–Siamese War (1547–1549)

King of Ayutthaya
- Reign: 1548 – 18 February 1564
- Coronation: 19 January 1549
- Predecessor: Worawongsathirat
- Successor: Mahinthrathirat (as tributary king)
- Reign: before 12 May 1568 – 15 April 1569
- Predecessor: Mahinthrathirat
- Successor: Mahinthrathirat
- Born: 1509
- Died: 15 April 1569; Ayutthaya
- Spouse: Sri Suriyothai
- Issue: Ramesuan; Mahinthrathirat; Wisutkasat; Boromdilok; Thepkasatri; Srisaowarat
- Dynasty: Suphannaphum

Maha Chakkraphat (Thai: มหาจักรพรรดิ, pronounced [mā.hǎː t͡ɕàk.krā.pʰát]; 1509 – 1569; Burmese: မဟာစကြဝတ္တိမင်း or မဟာချက္ကရဖတ်; also ဗြသာဓိရာဇာ, Phra Sādhirāja) or Phra Chao Chang Phueak (พระเจ้าช้างเผือก; "King of White Elephants") was king of the Ayutthaya kingdom from 1548 to 1564 and 1568 to 1569. Originally called Prince Thianracha (พระเทียรราชา, RTGS: Phra Thianracha), he was put on the throne by Khun Phiren Thorathep and his supporters of the Sukhothai clan, who had staged a coup by killing the usurper King Worawongsathirat and Si Sudachan.

== Prince of Ayutthaya ==
His original name is Thianracha. His initial biography is unclear. Evidence of his family appears in the Royal Chronicles, stating that "he was part of the royal family of King Chairathirat" and in Sangitiyavansa, a Pali text of the Rattanakosin era, stating that he was the nephew of King Chairachathirat. The evidence in Fernão Mendes Pinto's record states that he was the natural brother of King Chairachathirat. Thianracha joined his brother in the campaigns against Lanna and, in 1546, led the siege of Chiang Mai.

Chairacha died in 1546 and his son, Prince Kaewfa succeeded to the throne as King Yodfa, with his mother Sisudachan as regent. She had Yodfa killed in 1548 and eventually put her paramour on the throne as Khun Worawongsathirat. Before doing so however, Thianracha was her co-regent, but wishing to remain faithful to his wife Sri Suriyothai, he became a monk to the Queen Mother's amorous advances.

"A band of brothers", retired officers, led by Khun Piren staged a counter-coup, killing Worawongsathirat and Sisudachan. Phiren Thorathep then elevated Prince Thianracha to the throne as Phra Maha Chakkraphat, meaning "Great Emperor".

== King of Ayutthaya ==
Maha Chakkraphat appointed Phiren Thorathep to the position of King of Phitsanulok as Maha Thammarachathirat, and gave him in marriage his daughter Sawatdirat. (Maha Chakkraphat passed over tradition by elevating Phiren Thorathep instead of one of his sons; but he, when still Prince Thianracha, had himself never been titular ruler of Phitsanulok.) Khun Inthrathep was rewarded with the regency of Nakhon Si Thammarat.

=== First Siege of Ayutthaya (1548) ===
Upon Maha Chakkraphat's ascension, King Tabinshweti of the Burmese Dynasty of Toungoo marched to Ayutthaya, trying to take advantage of the upheavals in the Siamese capital.

The Burmese armies stopped near Ayutthaya. Tabinshweti came with his best general, the Uparaja Bayinnaung, Viceroy of Prome and Governor of Bassein. Maha Chakkraphat also took to the battleground his whole family, including Sri Suriyothai, the Uparaja Prince Ramesuan, and Prince Mahinthrathirat. At Pukaothong field, Maha Chakkraphat fought an elephant duel against the Viceroy of Prome but his elephant was overcame and ran away. Sri Suriyothai then rushed to rescue her husband but was slashed to death by the viceroy. The two princes then forced the viceroy to retreat.

The Siamese then put a culverin on a barge and sailed along the Chao Phraya to fire the enemies. The mission worked, the Burmese armies retreated but later they ambushed at Kamphaeng Phet the Siamese troops led by Prince Ramesuan and Maha Thammarachathirat. The Burmese held the two in captivity until Maha Chakkraphat gave up two male war elephants in exchange for his son and Maha Thammarachathirat.

=== War Over White Elephants (1563–1564) ===
After the war of 1548, Maha Chakkraphat insisted on battling Burmese armies near Ayutthaya, so he heavily fortified the city and de-fortified three nearby cities, Suphanburi, Lopburi and Nakhon Nayok in order to prevent the Burmese from taking them as bases. The census was taken to derive all available manpower for war. Wild elephants (especially white elephants) were caught and accumulated in the full-scale preparation for war.

Bayinnaung became King after the death of Tabinshwehti, and upon hearing about the white elephants, requested two. As Maha Chakkraphat refused, the Burmese King marched to Ayutthaya with a large army. His route was via the northern provinces since he had conquered the Lanna in 1558 and occupied Chiang Mai. Phraya Sukhothai and Phra Maha Thammaracha surrendered when Sukhothai and Phitsanulok were captured. The governors of Sawankhalok and Phichai submitted without resisting. At Chainat, Bayinnaung clashed with Prince Ramesuan's army but was able to break through. The Burmese army then reached Ayutthaya and laid siege, bombarding the city so immensely that Maha Chakkraphat "agreed to come to friendly relations with His Majesty of Hongsawadi." Additionally, he paid tribute of four white elephants and Phra Ramesuan, Phraya Chakri and Phra Songkhram were brought back to Pegu as hostages.

At Pegu, King Maha Chakkraphat entered the monkhood. Though Damrong Rajanubhab asserts the king only entered the monastery after his daughter Phra Thepkasattri was kidnapped by the Burmese, giving up his throne in dishonor. He resumed his regal powers at the urging of his son Mahinthrathirat.

=== Second Reign ===
In early 1568, the captive king successfully convinced Bayinnaung to allow him to go back to Ayutthaya on pilgrimage. Upon his arrival, in May 1568, he disrobed and revolted. He also entered into an alliance with King Setthathirath of Lan Xang. He was not able to convince Maha Thammarachathirat of Phitsanulok to join him and his son in the revolt. Thammarachathirat remained loyal to Bayinnaung and survived the siege by Ayutthaya and Lan Xang forces until October when the relief forces from Pegu arrived. The invasion armies laid the Third Siege of Ayutthaya in December 1568. According to Wyatt, Maha Chakkraphat died one month into the siege in January 1569. According to Prince Damrong, he died sometime during the siege. The Burmese chronicles say that the king died on 15 April 1569. (Note: (Yazawin Thit Vol. 2 2012: 249): Friday, 1st waxing of Kason 931 ME = 15 April 1569.)

== Bibliography ==
- Rajanubhab, Damrong (2001). Our Wars With the Burmese. Bangkok, Thailand: White Lotus. ISBN 9747534584.
- Harvey, G. E. (1925). History of Burma: From the Earliest Times to 10 March 1824. London: Frank Cass & Co. Ltd.
- Maha Sithu (1798). Myint Swe; Kyaw Win; Thein Hlaing (eds.). Yazawin Thit (in Burmese). Vol. 1–3 (2012, 2nd printing ed.). Yangon: Ya-Pyei Publishing.
- Royal Historical Commission of Burma (1829–1832). Hmannan Yazawin (in Burmese). Vol. 2 (2003 ed.). Yangon: Ministry of Information, Myanmar.
- Wyatt, David K. (2003). Thailand: A Short History (2 ed.). ISBN 978-0-300-08475-7.

Maha Chakkraphat House of Suphannaphum Born: 1509 Died: 15 April 1569
Regnal titles
Preceded by Worawongsathirat	King of Ayutthaya; First Reign; 1548 – 18 February 1564 (1564 as vassal king)	Succeeded by Mahinthrathirat
Preceded by Mahinthrathirat as vassal king	King of Ayutthaya; Second Reign before 12 May 1568 – 15 April 1569	Succeeded by Mahinthrathirat
