= Aranyik (disambiguation) =

Aranyik (Thai: อรัญญิก) may refer to:

- Aranyik subdistrict in Mueang Phitsanulok District, Phitsanulok, Thailand
- Aranyik subdistrict municipality in Nakhon Luang district, Ayutthaya, Thailand
- Wat Aranyik, various temples
