= Chalermkwansatree School =

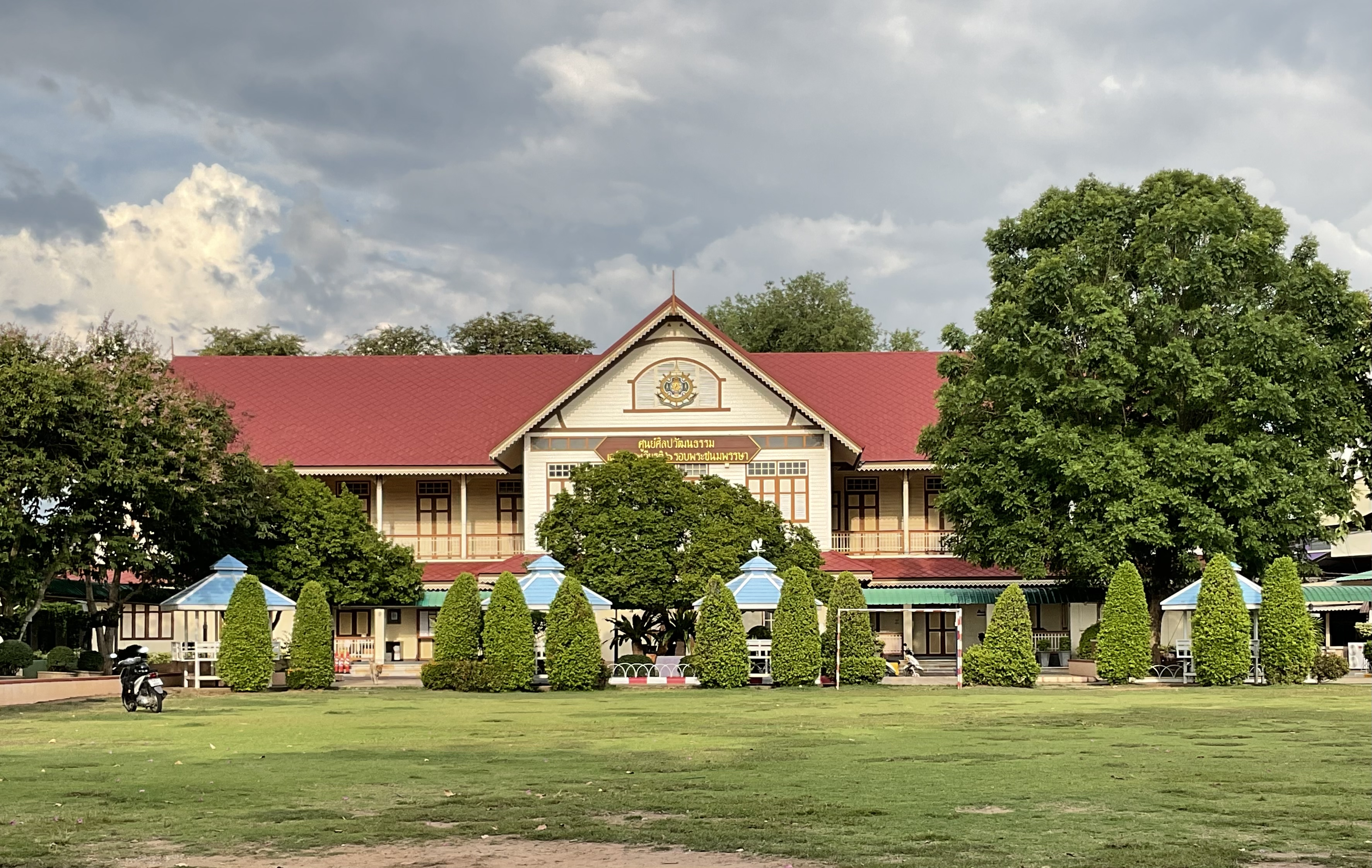
- Building 5, the first administration building of school

Location
- 28 Phutthabucha Road; Nai Mueang, Mueang Phitsanulok, Phitsanulok 65000; Thailand
- Coordinates: 16°49′11″N 100°15′36″E

Information
- Former name: School for Girls of Monthon Phitsanulok
- Type: Public high school
- Motto: Pali: นฺตถิ ปญฺญา สมา อาภา (There is no light as bright as the wisdom)
- Established: 1923; 103 years ago
- School district: Educational Service Area 39
- Principal: Piyachai Bhuchandithkul
- Grades: 7–12
- Gender: School for girls (Grade 7–9); Coeducational (Grade 10–12)
- Enrollment: 3,090 (2024)
- Student to teacher ratio: 20.74
- Campus size: 11.55 acres (4.67 ha)
- Colors: Navy and White
- Song: March Chalermkwansatree song
- Mascot: Saraswati; Devil's tree
- Newspaper: Kwan Ying (Thai: ขวัญหญิง)
- Yearbook: San Phet Saraswati (Thai: สารเพชรสรัสวดี)
- Website: www.chs.ac.th

Chalermkwansatree School (CHS; Thai: โรงเรียนเฉลิมขวัญสตรี, pronounced [tɕʰàʔ.lɤ̌ːm.kʰwǎn.sàʔ.triː]), is a public secondary school in Phitsanulok, Thailand. Located in the city centre, near the Wat Ratchaburana. Operated by the Office of the Basic Education Commission (Educational Service Area 39), it is the only school in the province that provides exclusive education for female students.

Founded as School for Girls of Monthon Phitsanulok (Thai: โรงเรียนสตรีประจำมณฑลพิษณุโลก) on November 8, 1923, it initially offered education from kindergarten through teacher training. However, by 1943, the kindergarten, primary, and teacher training programs were phased out. Today, the school offers education for grades 7 to 12 (Matthayom 1-6) with a total of 81 classrooms.
