= Wat Aranyik =

Wat Aranyik may refer to:

- Wat Aranyik, Phitsanulok, a historic temple in Phitsanulok, Thailand
- Wat Aranyik, Sukhothai, ruins of a 13th-century temple in Sukhothai, Thailand
