= Wat Phra Si Rattana Mahathat =

Buddhist temple in Phitsanulok, Thailand

- วัดพระศรีรัตนมหาธาตุวรมหาวิหาร
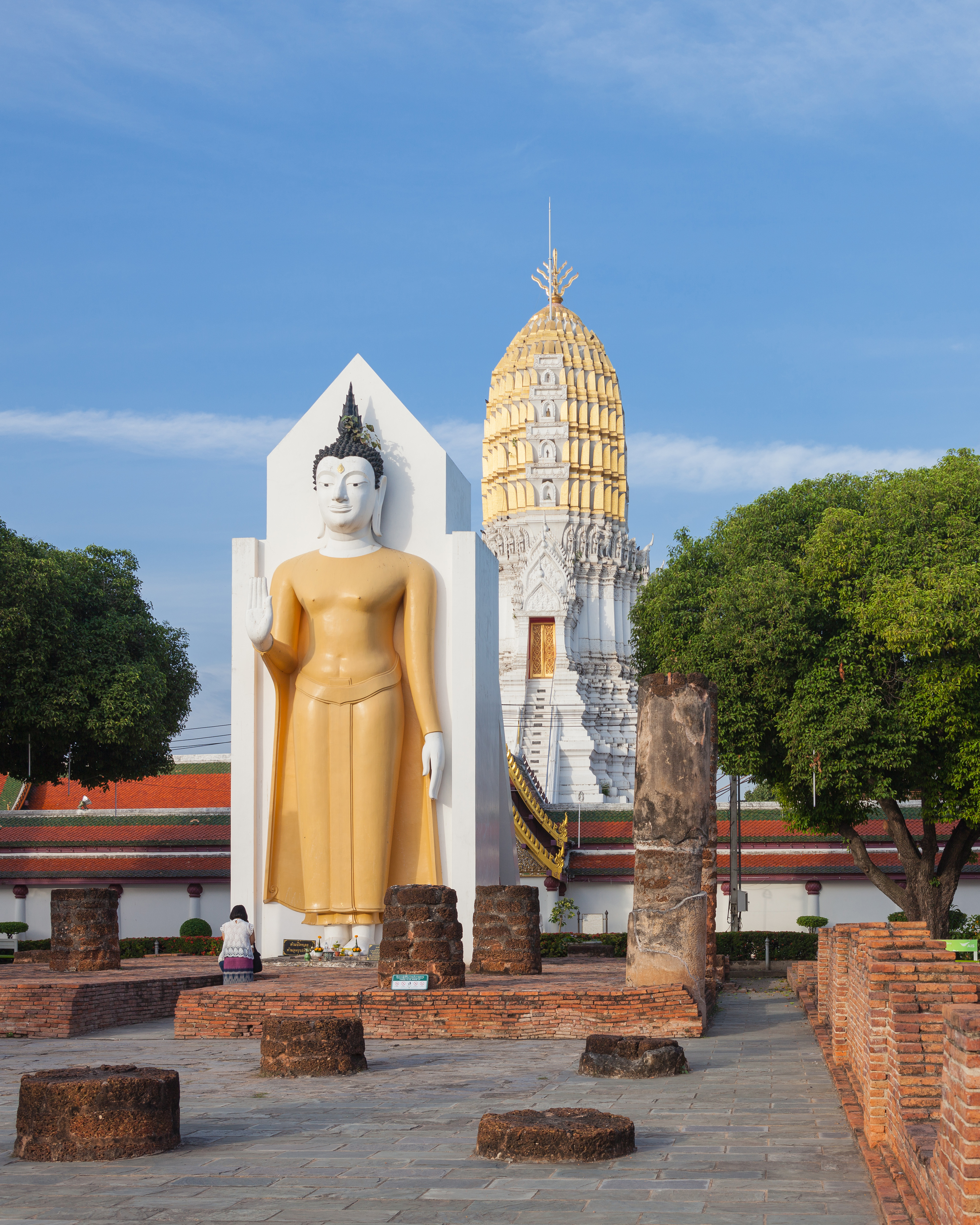
- Phra Attharot, The Standing Buddha

- Location in Thailand

Religion
- Affiliation: Buddhism
- Sect: Theravāda
- Leadership: Phra Thep Rattanamuni (abbot)

Location
- Country: Thailand
- Coordinates: 16.8237°N 100.2622°E

Architecture
- Founder: Maha Thammaracha I

Wat Phra Sri Rattana Mahathat (Thai: วัดพระศรีรัตนมหาธาตุ; "Temple of the Great Jewelled Reliquary"), colloquially referred to as Wat-Phra-Sri (Thai: วัดพระศรี) or Wat Yai (Thai: วัดใหญ่; "Big Temple"), is a Buddhist temple (wat) in Phitsanulok Province, Thailand, where it is located on east bank of Nan River, near Naresuan Bridge and opposite Phitsanulok Provincial Hall. It is about 337 km (209 mi) from Bangkok.

== History ==
Wat Phra Si Rattana Mahathat, known among the locals as "Wat Yai", was founded in 1357 by King Lithai of Sukhothai. The temple was built at the same time as Phra Phuttha Chinnarat, Phra Phuttha Chinna Si, and Phra Si Satsada. During the reign of King Ekathotsarot of Ayutthaya, its Buddha image was gilded and the temple was later developed by King Chulalongkorn and King Bhumibol Adulyadej of Rattanakosin. The temple is located at the foot of Naresuan Bridge on the bank of the Nan River. It has an area of 36 rai (1 rai = 1600 m^2). The temple is very famous because of its golden Buddha image called Phra Phuttha Chinnarat, which is considered by some Thais to be the most beautiful Buddha image in the country.

Father of Thai history Prince Damrong Rajanubhab recorded this temple that.

"The temple is a big and more important than other temples in Phitsanulok and is believed to be built in the Sukhothai period being renovated from time to time".

== Phra Phuttha Chinnarat ==
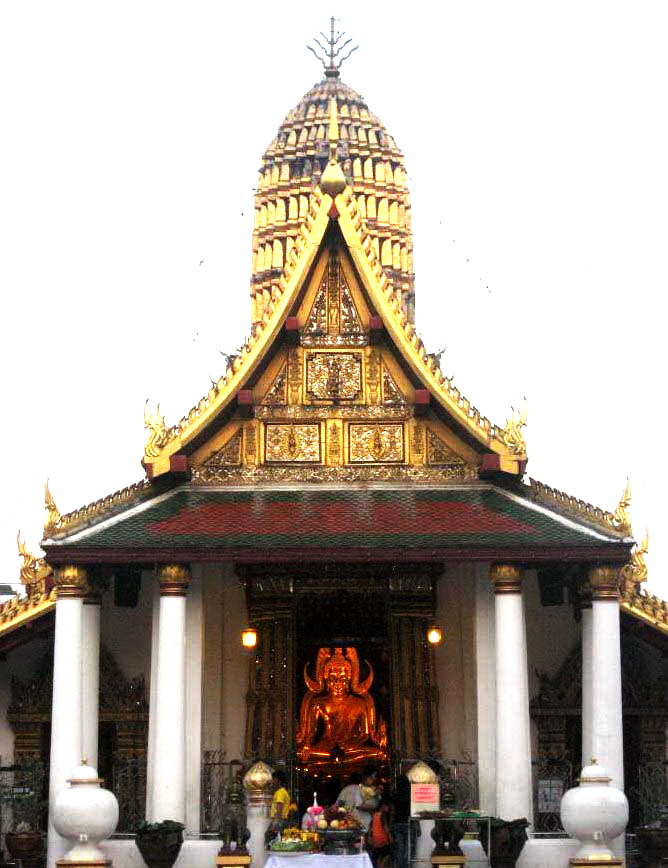
The vihara of the Phra Phuttha Chinnarat

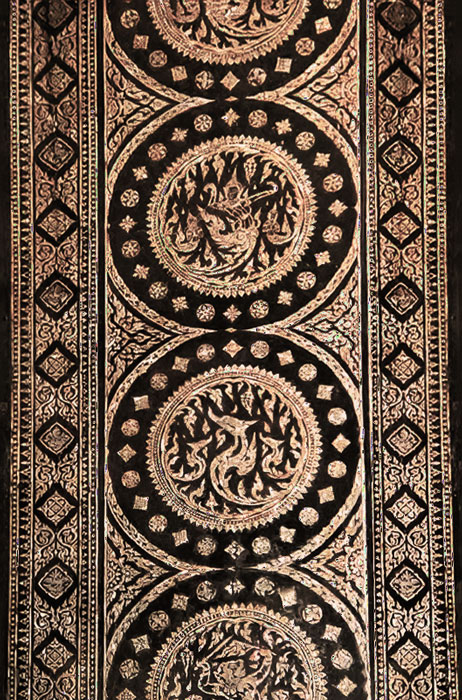
The mother-of-pearl inlaid doors of the Phra Phuttha Chinnarat vihara. Built in 1756 during the reign of King Borommakot, they are considered a masterpiece of late Ayutthaya art.

The temple is famous for its gold-covered statue of the Buddha, known as Phra Phuttha Chinnarat (Thai: พระพุทธชินราช; "King of Victory"). It is considered one of the most beautiful and the classical magnificent Buddha figures in Thailand and receive the highest worship among Thai people, equivalent to Luang Pho Sothon of Wat Sothonwararam in Chachoengsao Province (not including Emerald Buddha).

This Buddha statue was cast together with other statues of the same Buddha, including Phra Phuttha Chinna Si (Thai: พระพุทธชินสีห์) and Phra Si Satsada (Thai: พระศรีศาสดา), which are currently enshrined in this temple.

According to the legends, there are still a controversy about the time of casting these statues. Some believed it was in the 10th century. Some said it might be in the 14th century. However, in the northern history (Pong Sawadarn Nuea; Thai: พงศาวดารเหนือ; "northern chronicle") had been registered that.

"In the year B.E. 1900 Phra Si Thamma Tripidok or Phra Maha Thammaracha-Lithai, after the completion of building of Wat Phra Si Rattana Mahathat wanted to cast three Buddha statues as the principal image in the vihara. The king got five Brahmins named Ba Indra, Ba Brahm, Ba Vishnu, Ba Rachasingh and Ba Rachakusol. The king asked for renowned sculptors from Si Satchanalai town or Sawankhalok together with the first class artisans from Chiang Saen and Hariphunchai to assist in the casting of the three Buddha statues"

The first Buddha statue was a Mara Vichai episode of 5 sok (1 sok = 50 cm) 1 kueb (1 kueb = 25 cm) 5 new (1 new = 2.45 cm) measuring from end of laps in sitting posture. The second Buddha statue was of a Mara Vichai period of 5 sok 1 kueb 4 new measuring from end of laps in sitting posture and the third Buddha statue of Mara Vichai period of 4 sok 1 kueb 6 new measuring from lap to lap in sitting position.

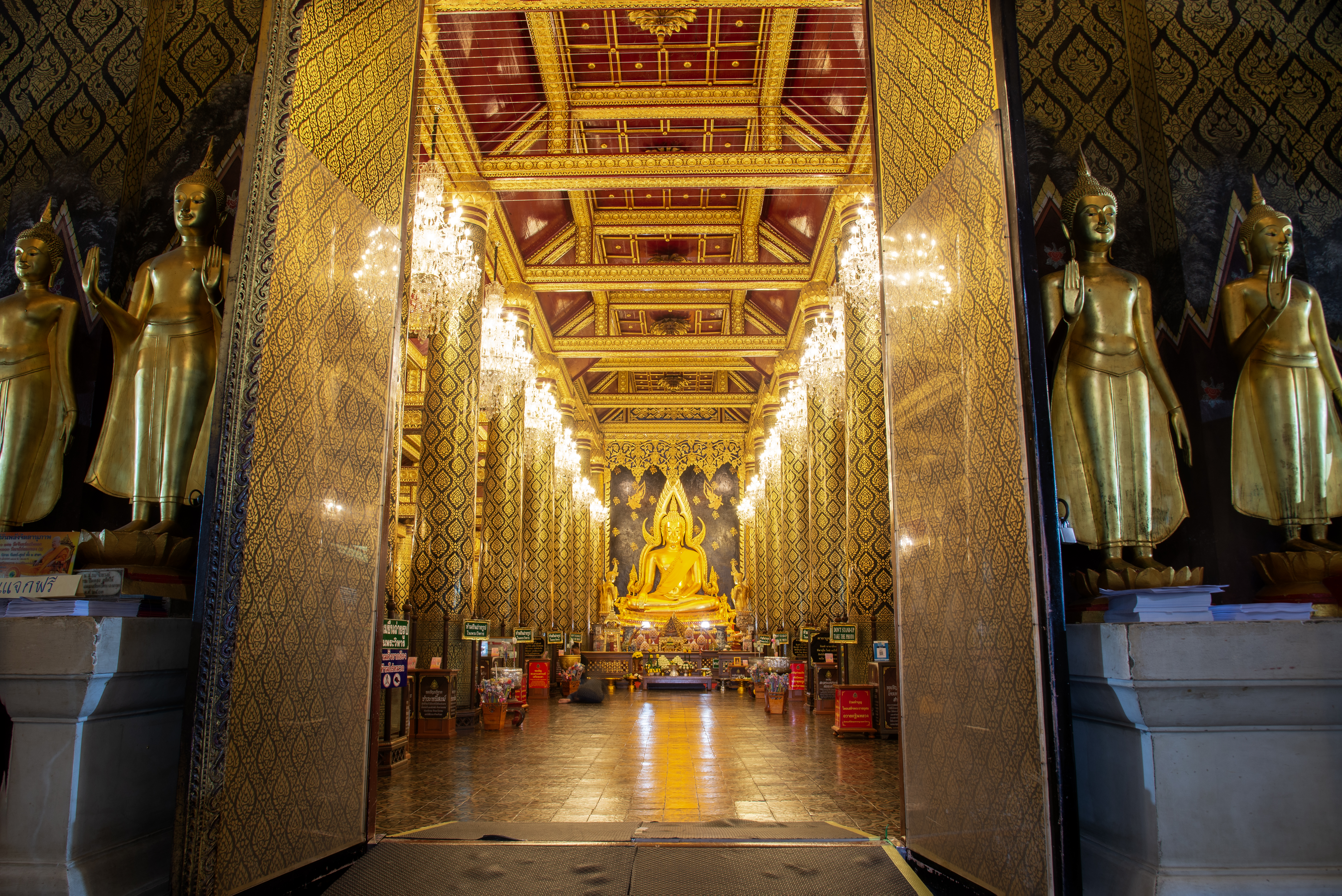

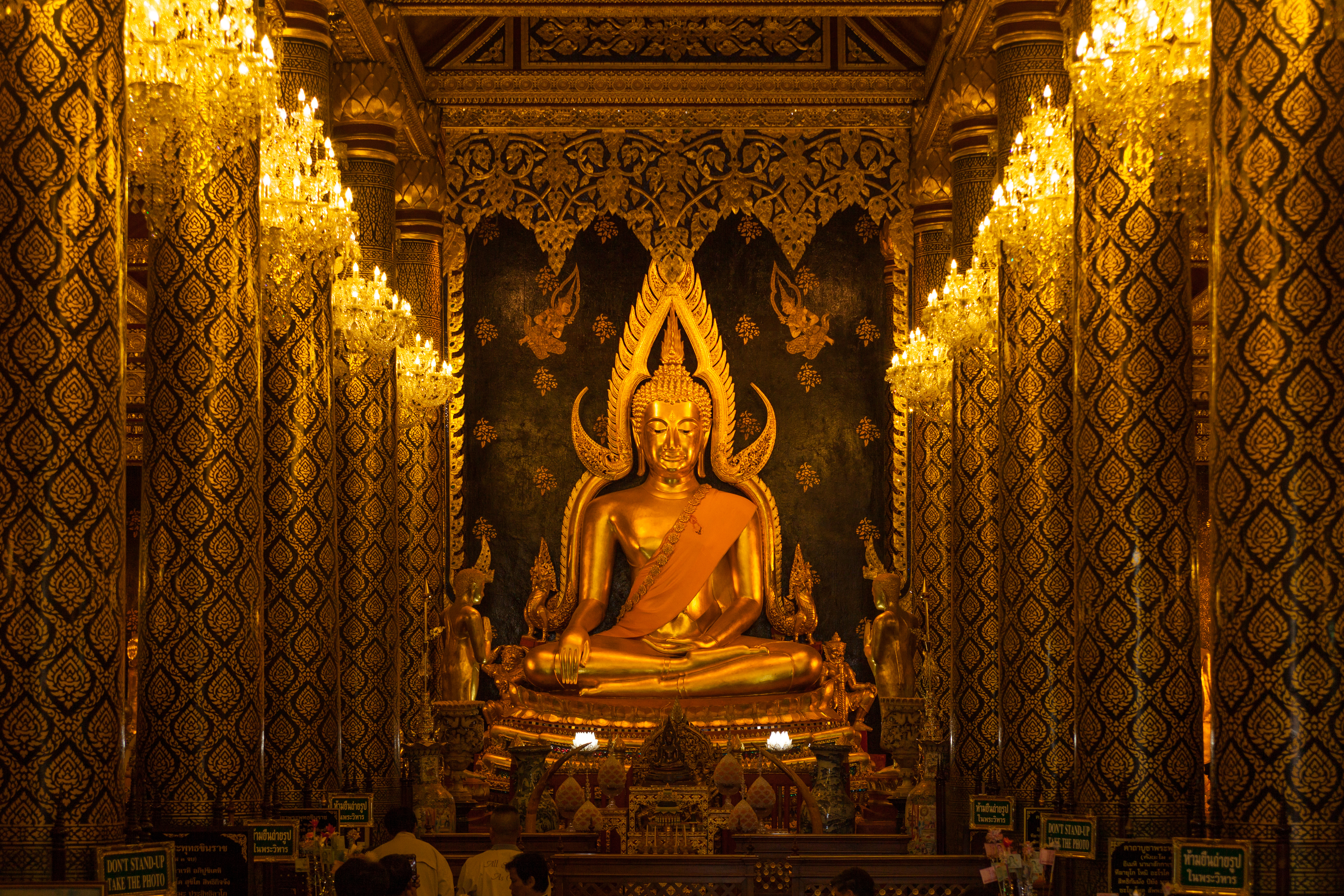

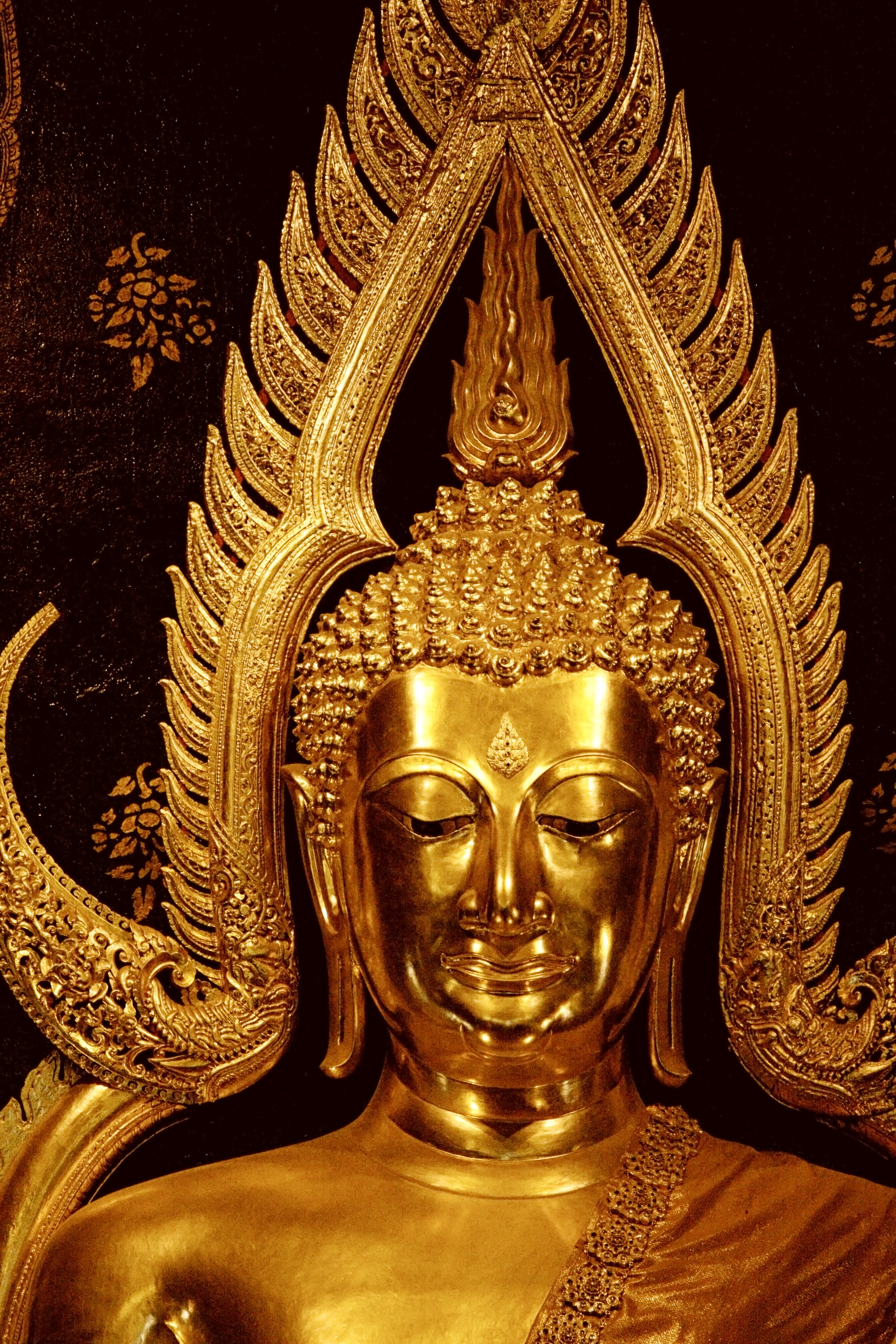

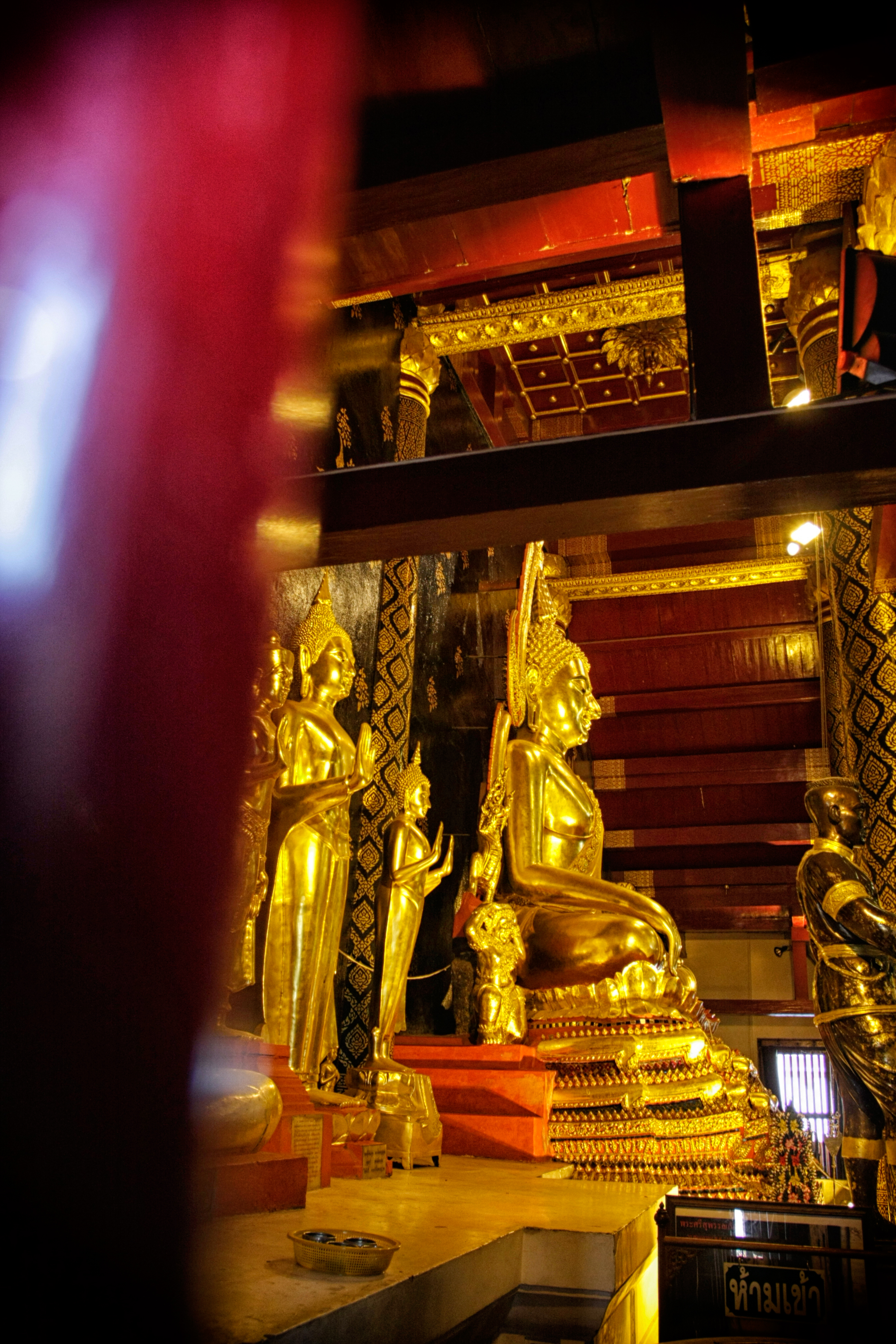

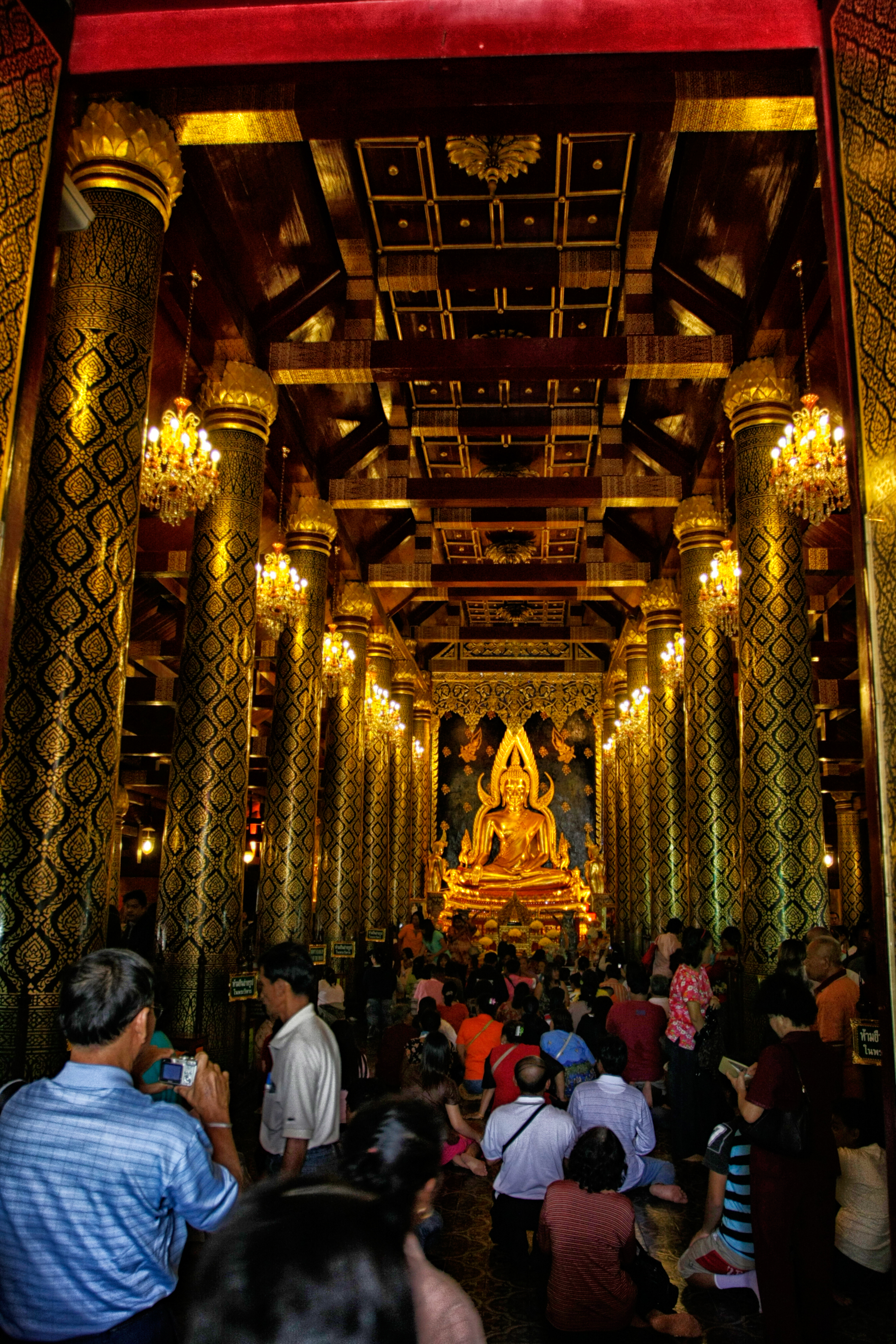

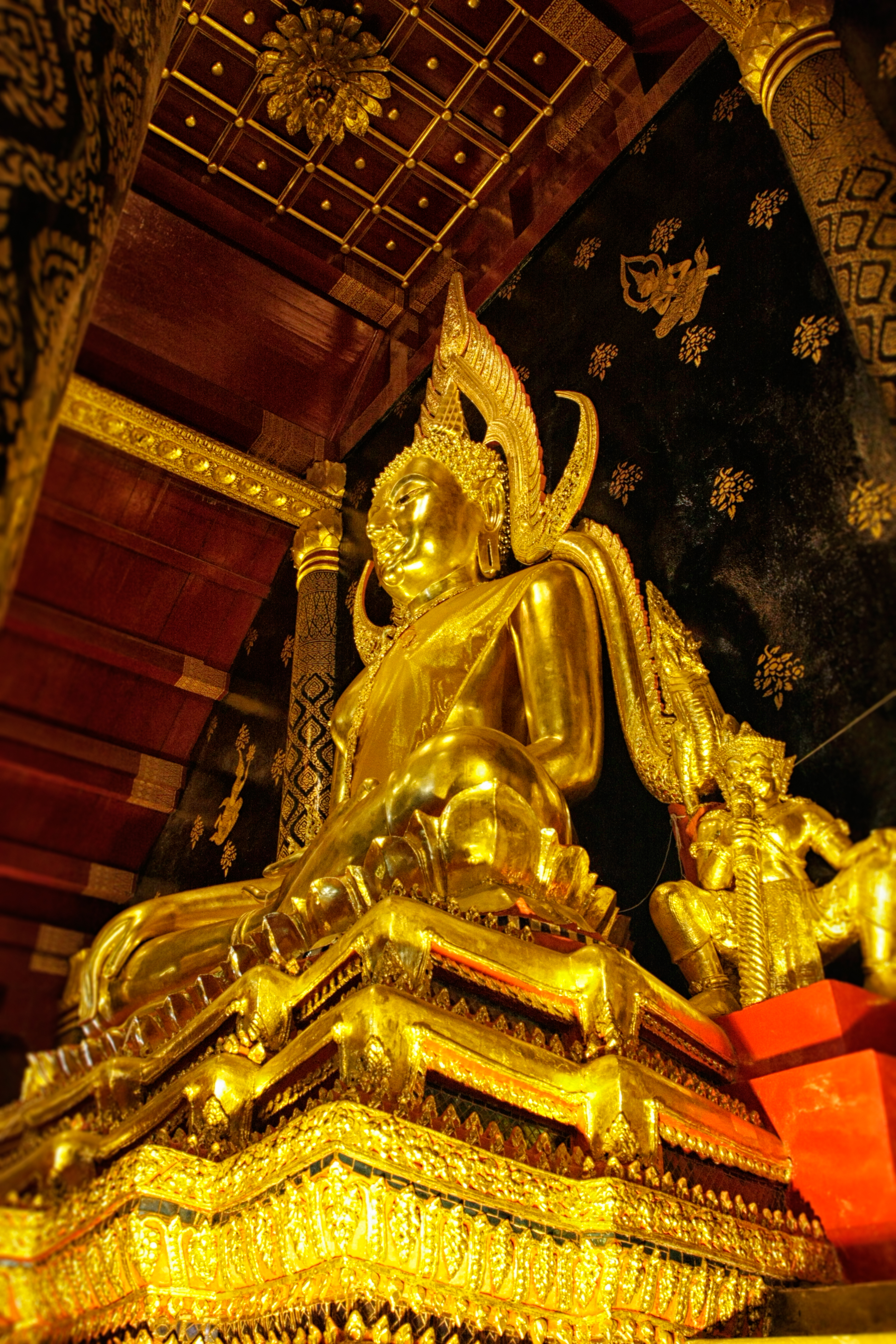

== Architecture ==
The temple's large vihara has an immense main entrance with mother-of-pearl inserts donated by King Boromakot in 1756. Beyond the wihan is a Khmer style prang, the inside of which can be accessed via a stairway. The prang is said to enshrine relics of the Buddha.

And front of prang is statue of Buddha image in standing position holding his right hand up. This Buddha symbol is called Phra Attharot (Thai: พระอัฏฐารส), a height of 18 sok (9 m). This place is called Vihara Phra Attharot (Thai: วิหารพระอัฏฐารส) or Phra Vihara Kao Hong (Thai: พระวิหารเก้าห้อง; "nine halls sanctuary").

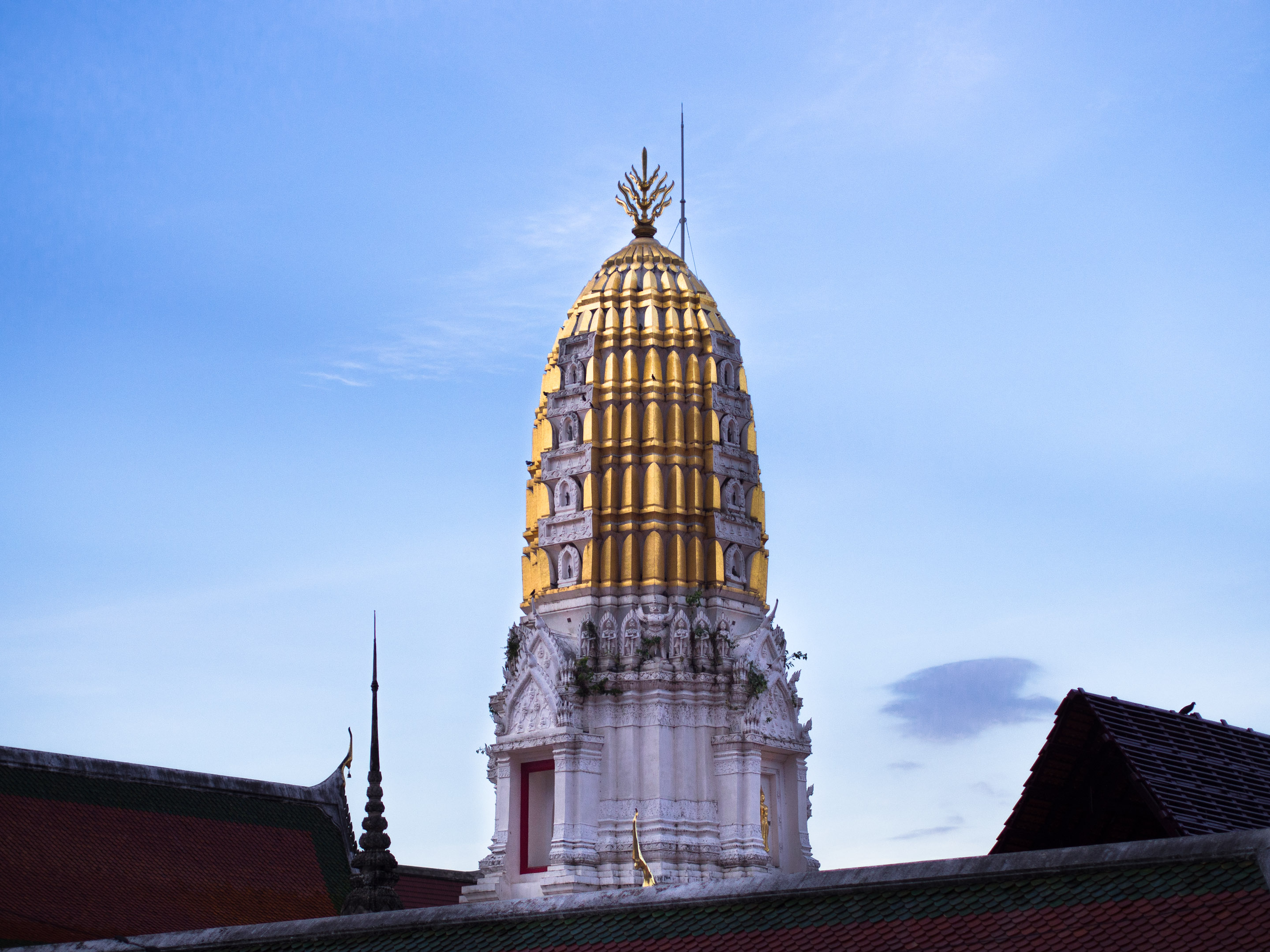
Gilded upper section of the prang

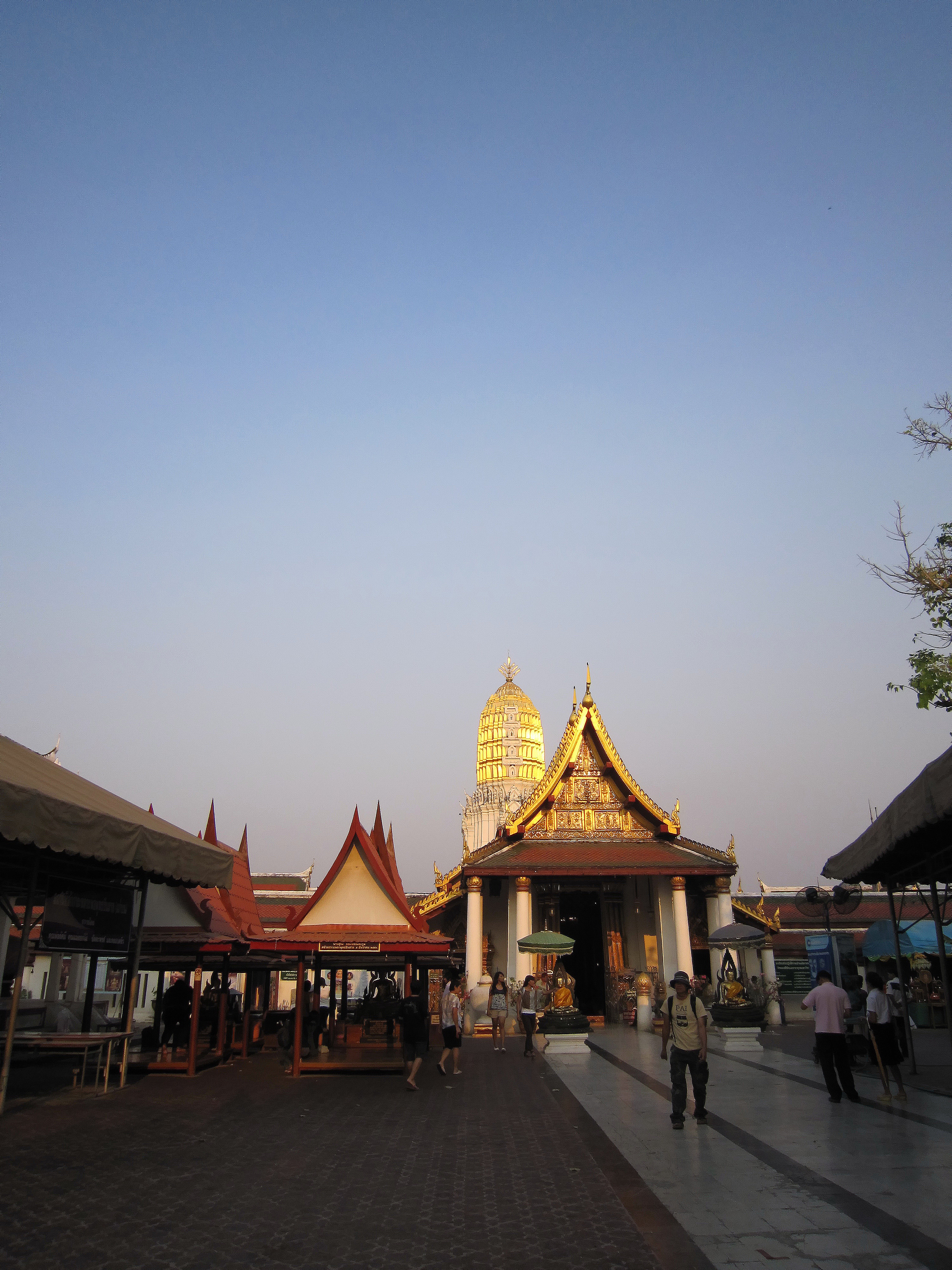
Vihara with the prang in the background

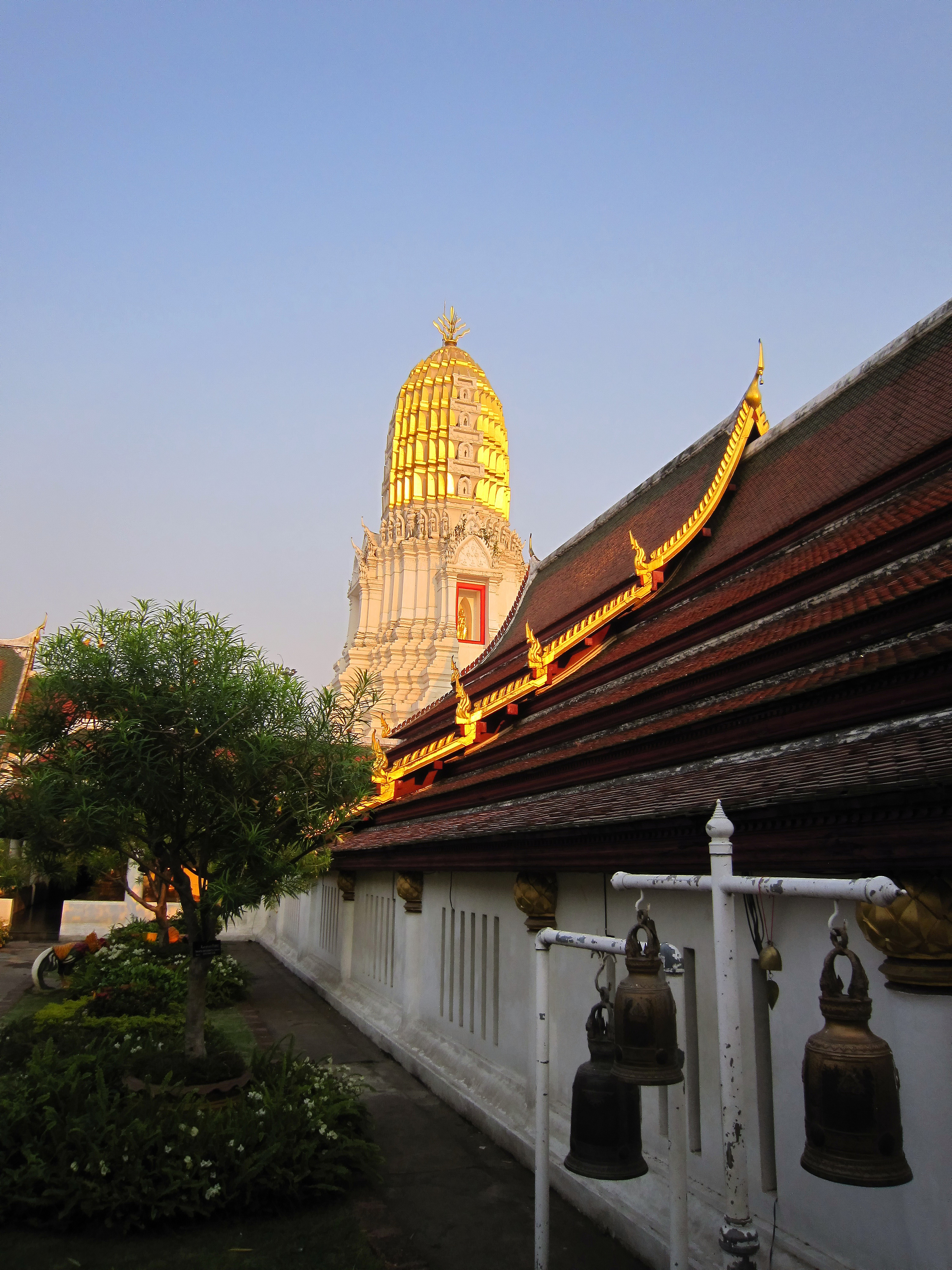

== Museum ==
The Phuttha Chinnarat National Museum, located on the temple grounds, exhibits various kinds of ancient objects and art objects which derived from not only excavation in ancient monuments, but also presented by Buddhists to be offering to Buddha. All high value objects reflect the history, archaeology, culture, customs and traditions of Phitsanulok and vicinity towns from the past to present. The significant objects displayed such as Buddha statues, votive tablets, Sangkhalok ware, Chinese blue and white ceramics, Chinese painted enamel ware, Thai ceramics with five colours (Benjarong) and with gold painted enamels (Lai Nam Thong), crystal glassware, miniature of threes with gold and silver leaves presented by King Bhumibol Adulyadej and Queen Sirikit and all members of his royal family.

Formerly, this museum was the museum under supervision of Wat Phra Si Rattana Mahathat, and then was proclaimed in the government gazette on November 14, 1961, to be the national museum by the Fine Arts Department.

== Events ==
Festivals often take place on the temple grounds, including the annual Phra Phuttha Chinnarat Fair. Also, on the first weekend of each October, the Phitsanulok Dragon Boat Races take place outside the temple in the river.
