= Songkwae Technical College =

School in Thailand

Information
- Staff: c.60
- Age: 15 to 22
- Enrollment: c.300 (2012)

Songkwae Technical College is located in Phitsanulok, Thailand.

The school is a state sponsored vocational school with students between 15 and 22 years old. In 2012 there is approximately 300 students and 60 staff including teachers. The student body is diverse, with Karen and Hmong students.
