= Phitsanulok =

Phitsanulok พิษณุโลก Song Khwae • สองแคว
- City municipality
- Phitsanulok City Municipality เทศบาลนครพิษณุโลก
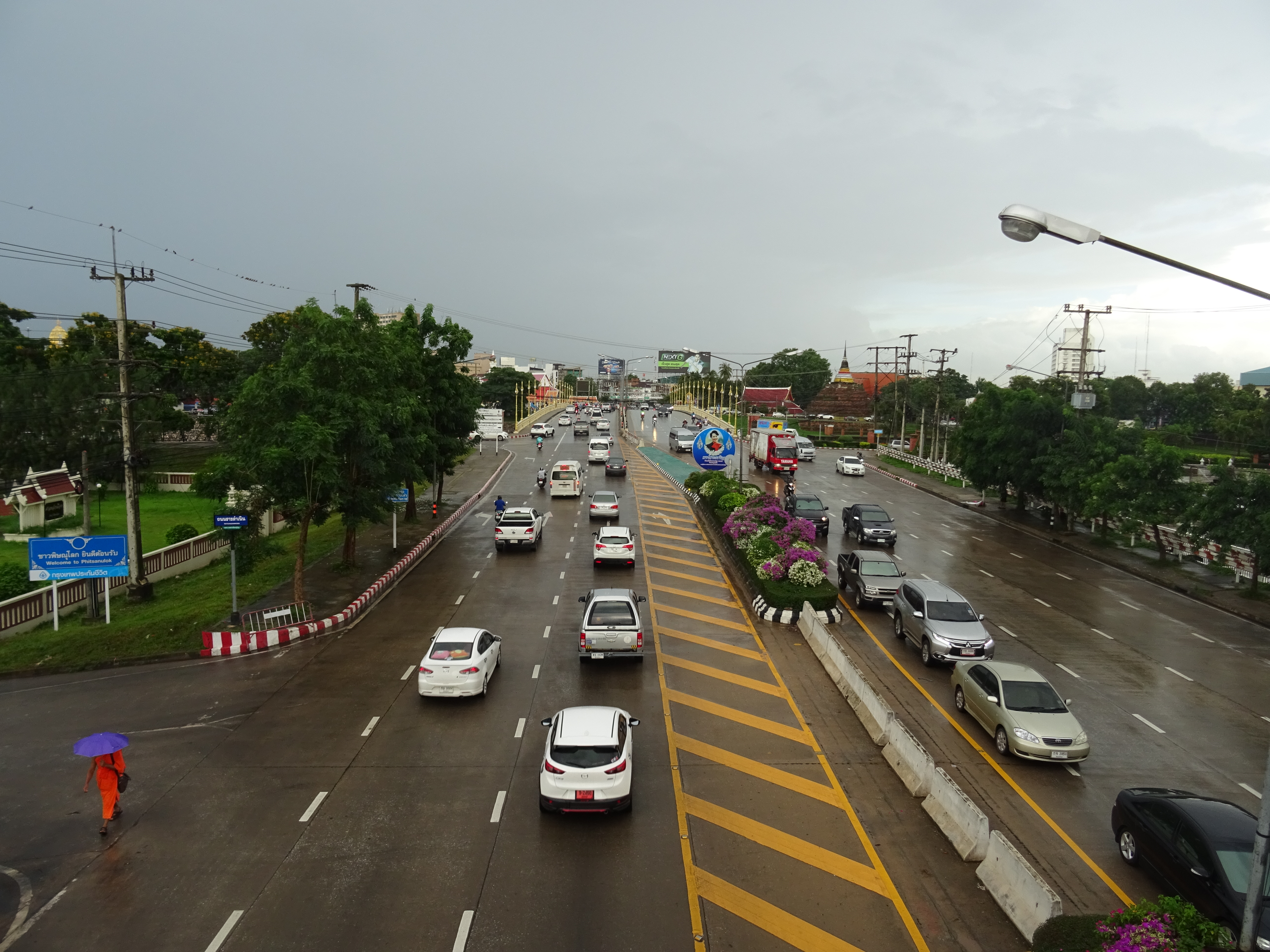
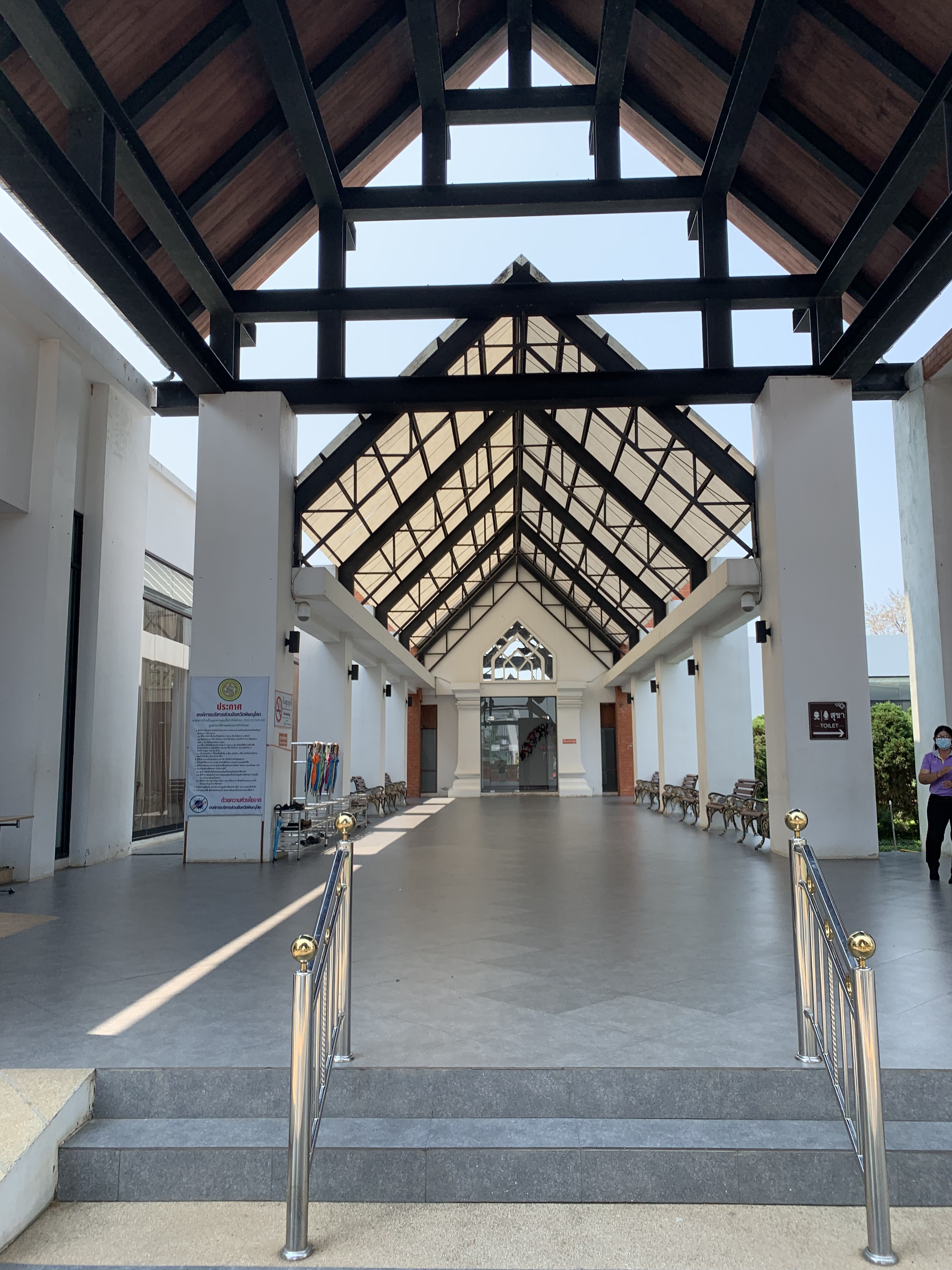
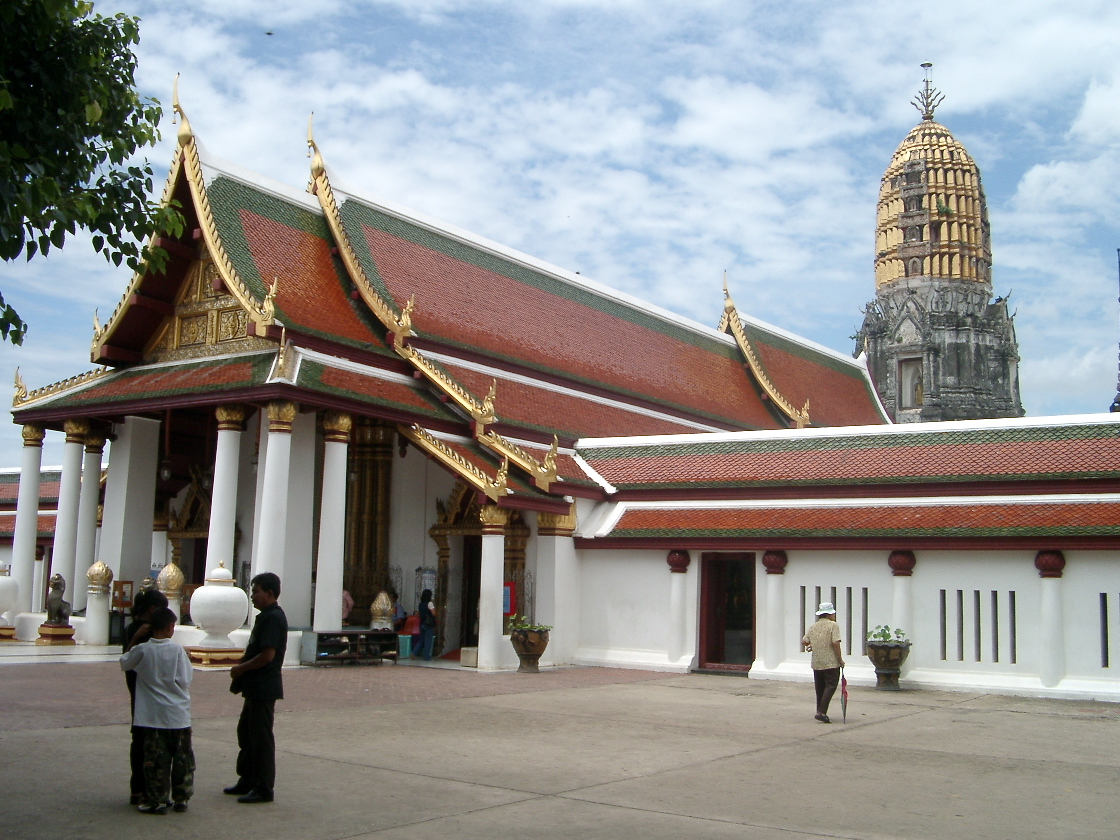
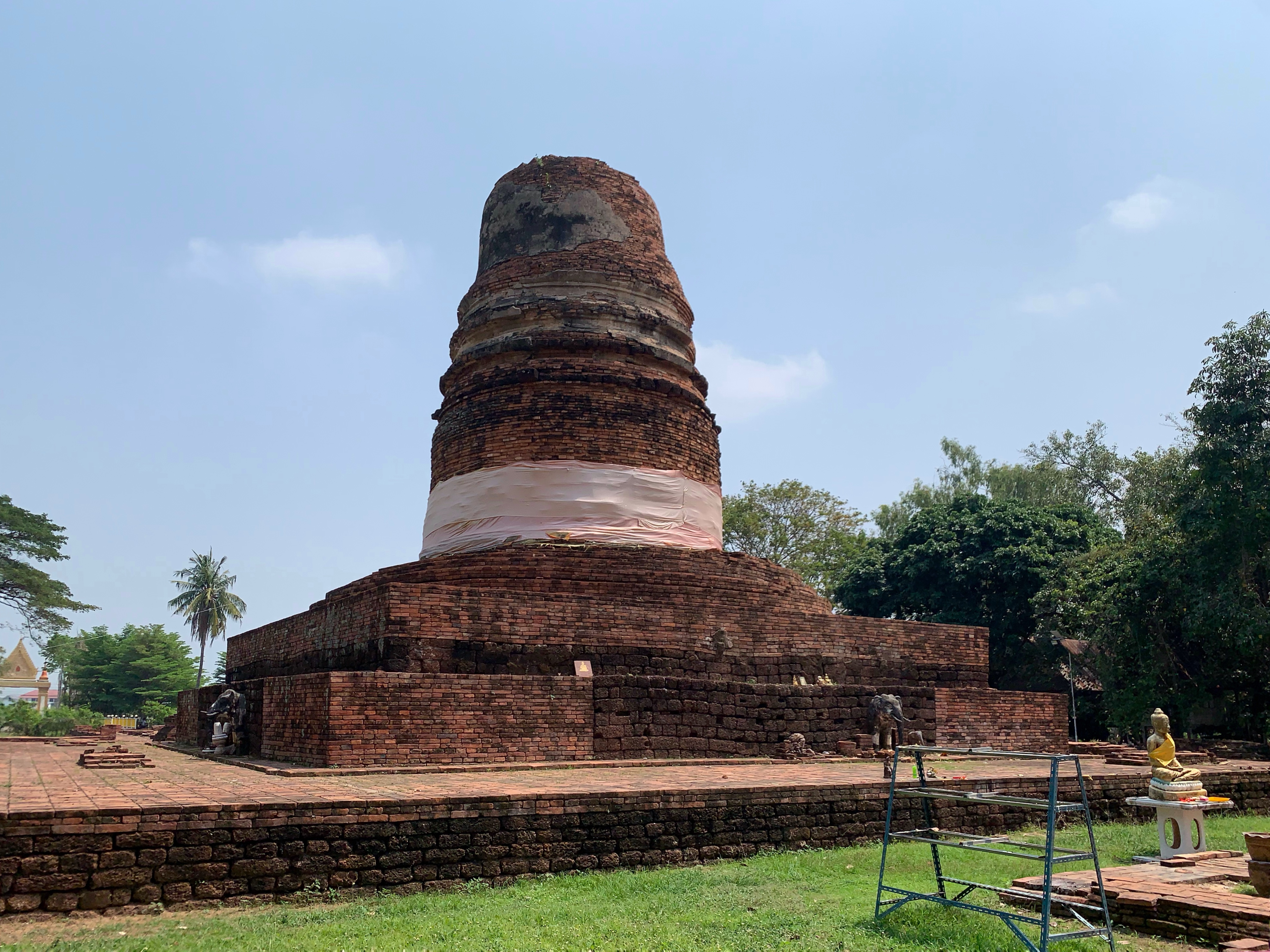
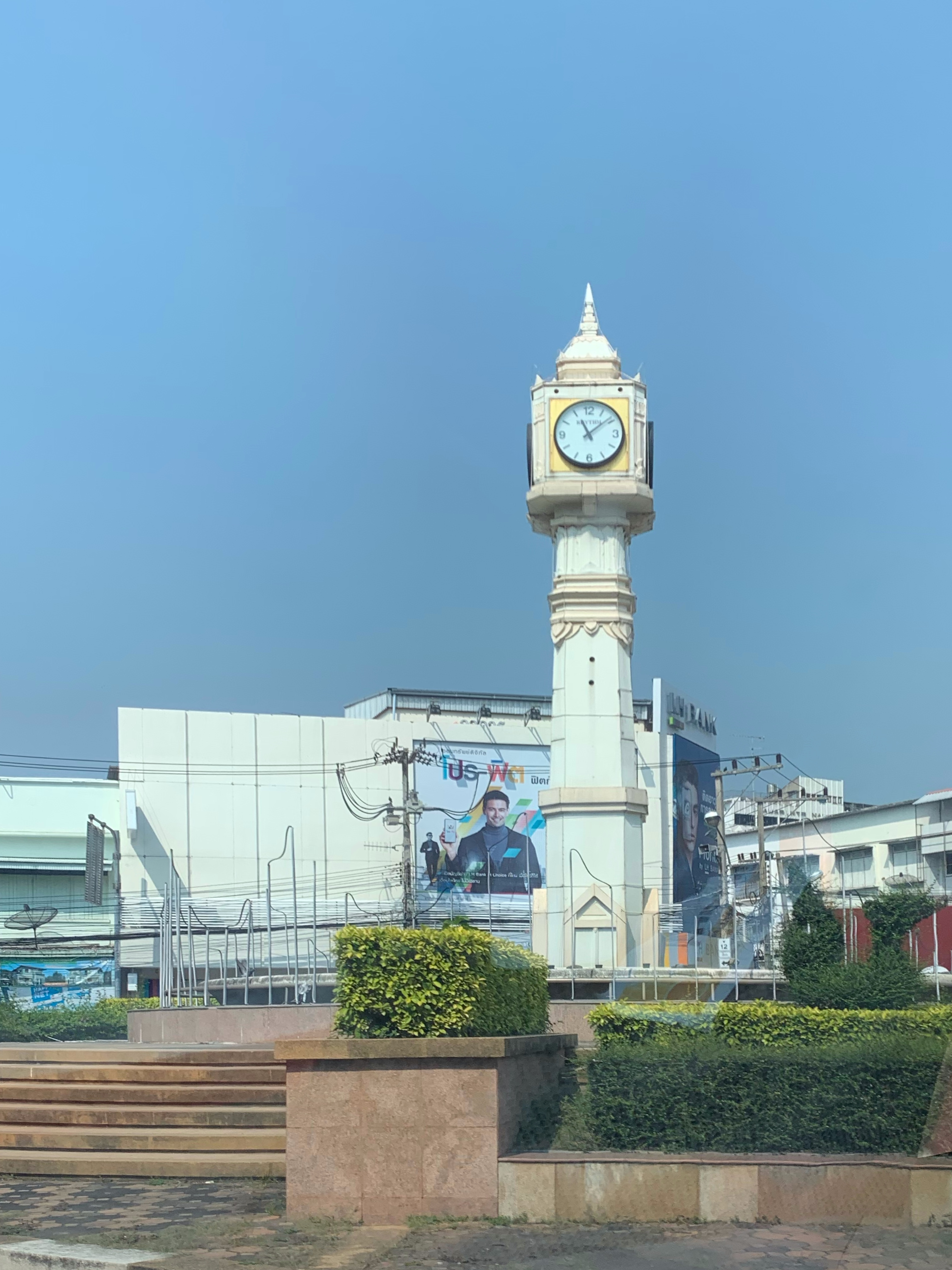
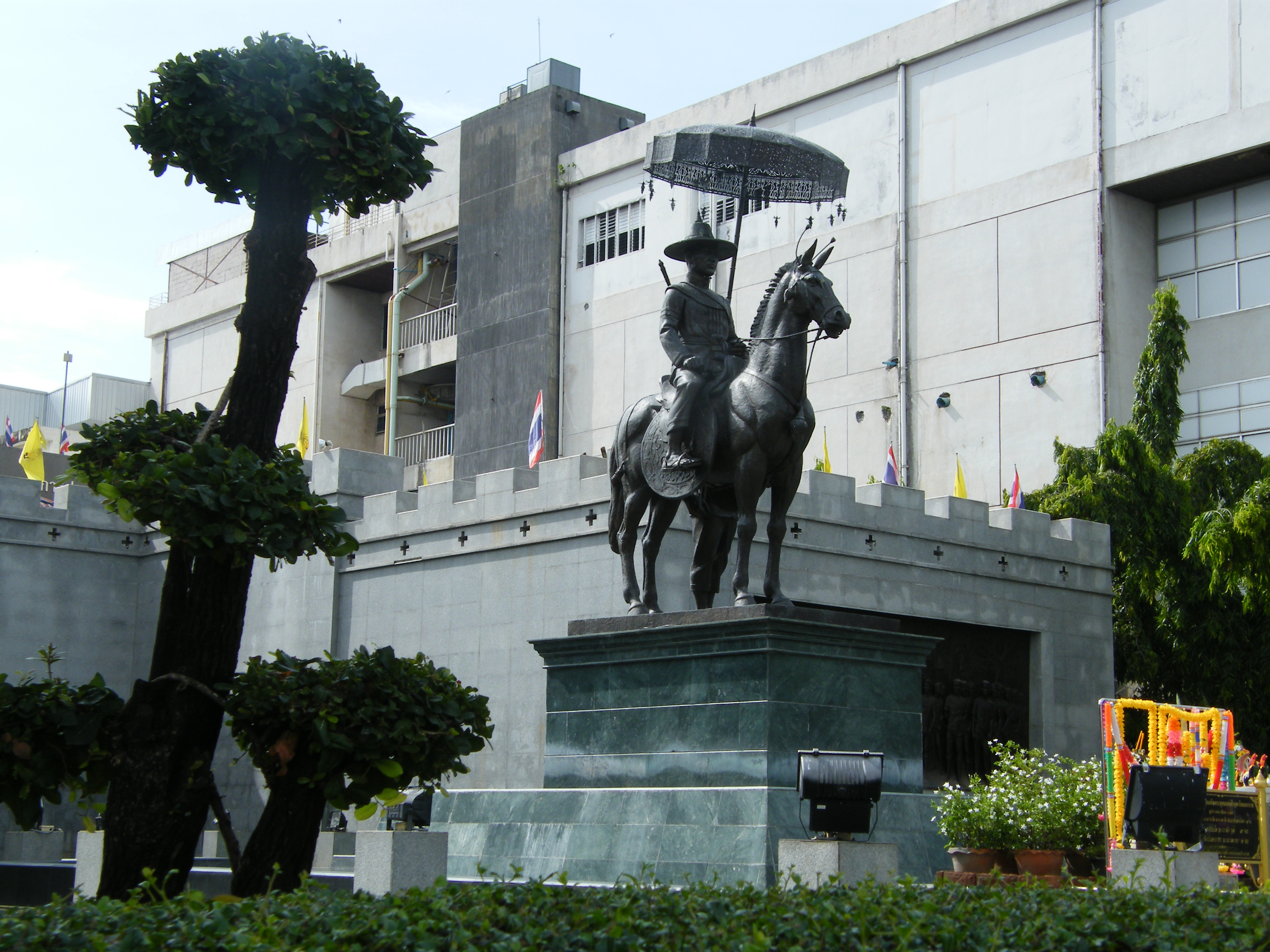
- Clockwise from top: The route 12, Chan Royal Palace Historical Center, Wat Aranyik, Rama I Equestrian Statue, Phitsanulok Clock Tower, Wat Phra Si Rattana Mahathat

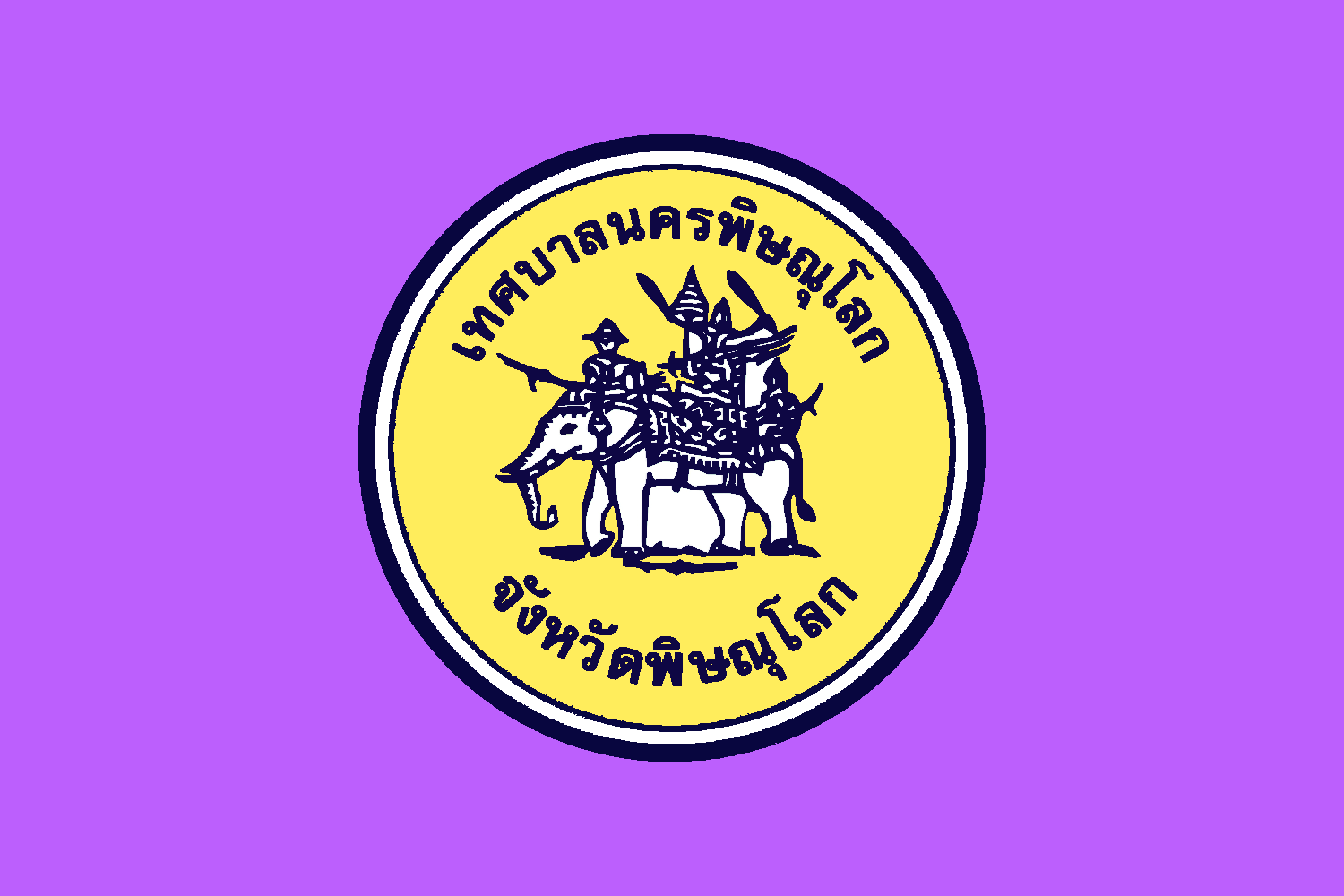
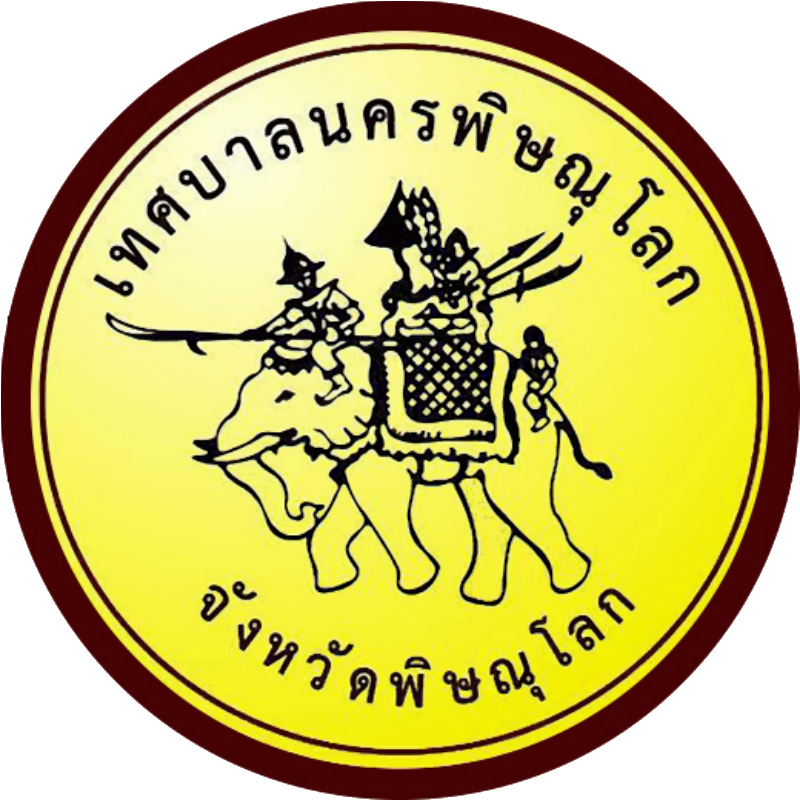
- Flag Seal

- Location within Thailand Location within the Asia Location within Earth
- Coordinates: 16°48′57″N 100°15′49″E
- Country: Thailand
- Province: Phitsanulok
- District: Mueang Phitsanulok District

Government
  - Type: City municipality
  - Mayor: Sirichin Hanphithakphong

Area
  - City municipality: 18.26 km^{2} (7.05 sq mi)
  - Urban: 777 km^{2} (300 sq mi)
- Elevation: 51 m (167 ft)

Population (2022)
  - City municipality: 62,584
  - Rank: 10th (Urban)
  - Density: 3,427/km^{2} (8,877/sq mi)
  - Urban: 281,929
- Time zone: UTC+7:00 (ICT)
- Postal code: 65000
- Calling code: (+66) 55
- Geocode: 650101
- Chief roadway: Route 12
- Chief watercourse: Nan River
- Chief airport: Phitsanulok Airport
- Website: www.phsmun.go.th

Phitsanulok (Thai: พิษณุโลก, pronounced [pʰít.sà.nú.lôːk]) is a city municipality in northern Thailand and the capital of Phitsanulok province. In 2024 it had a city population of 60,827 and an urban population of about 200,000. That made it Thailand's 19th-most populous city proper and one of the major urban centers of the north. Located in the geographic center of the province, it occupies the fertile plains along the banks of the Nan River, which flows south to join the Chao Phraya River.

The city grew from an older settlement called Song Khwae (lit. 'two rivers'). It was a second capital more than once: under the late Sukhothai Kingdom, and under the Ayutthaya Kingdom, when King Borommatrailokanat resided there to hold the frontier against the Lanna Kingdom. He unified the western and eastern Song Khwae settlements and renamed them "Phitsanulok". Due to its strategic importance as Ayutthaya's northern outpost, the city frequently faced Burmese attacks. When war with the Konbaung dynasty led to Ayutthaya's collapse in 1767, Chaophraya Phitsanulok declared himself king and briefly established Phitsanulok as a capital before it was incorporated into the Thonburi Kingdom. The city maintained its significance throughout the subsequent Rattanakosin period.

Phitsanulok is considered one of the country's oldest cities and is home to Wat Phra Si Rattana Mahathat, which houses Phra Phuttha Chinnarat, one of the most famous and copied Buddha images in Thailand. The city serves as an educational hub, with Naresuan University being the main higher education institution in the lower northern Thailand. Its location has also made it a transport hub. City buses run in the town, the railway station lies on the Northern Line between Bangkok and Chiang Mai, and Phitsanulok Airport carries flights to Bangkok and serves the surrounding provinces.

== Toponymy ==
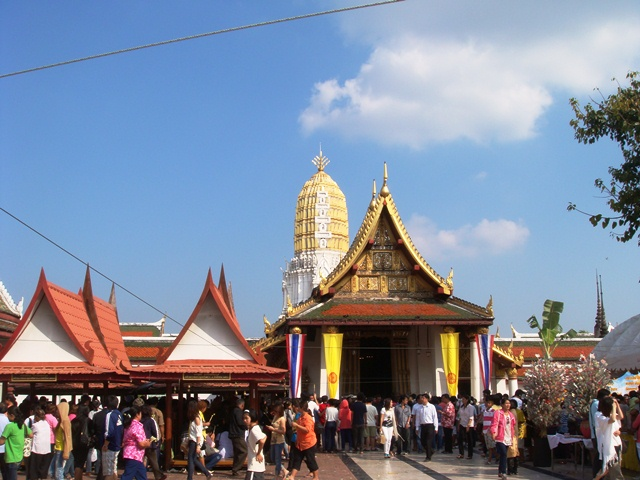
Wat Phra Sri Rattana Mahathat

- Song Khwae: The first element, song, means the number 'two'. The second element, khwae, means 'tributary', hence 'two rivers'.
- Phitsanulok: The first element, Phitsanu (Thai: พิษณุ; Sanskrit: viṣṇu विष्णु "Vishnu"), is a cognate of 'Vishnu', a Hindu god (see, e.g., Witnu, Thai: วิษณุ). Lack of a v sound in the Thai language accounts for the two forms. The second element, lok (Thai: โลก; Sanskrit: loka लोक 'world') means 'globe' or 'world'. A loose translation of the entire name would be 'Vishnu's heaven'.

Piriya Krairiksh argued that the name Song Khwae, "two-branch city", belonged not to Phitsanulok but to Nakhon Sawan. Michael Vickery rejected this. He pointed out that the sources call Naresuan's father lord of Phitsanulok, and that the van Vliet chronicle calls him "Phraya Song Khveen". He nonetheless granted that the name fits the geography of Nakhon Sawan better. Piriya also used the itinerary of the Jinakalamali to argue that its Satchanalai meant Phitsanulok, which Vickery called not a necessary conclusion.

== History ==
Phitsanulok is one of the oldest cities in Thailand. "Muang Yommarat" (เมืองยมราช), a circular-moated Dvaravati settlement of the 6th to 10th centuries about 1 kilometer across, lay 8 kilometers northwest of the present-day city center. The new city named "Song Khwae" was later founded over 600 years ago, located 5 kilometers south of the present-day Phitsanulok. According to the retrospective chronology derived from the textual evidence presented in the Ayutthaya Testimonies, the city of Phitsanulok was established in 937 (Note: The dates of the events mentioned in this chapter were retroactively reconstructed based on the documented accession date of a later ruler, Fang-hui-chih, who governed Chen Li Fu—a polity likewise centered in the Phraek Si Racha region—from 1180 to 1204 CE, as attested in contemporary Chinese sources.) by a monarch of Sankhaburi named Sudhammaraja. It then became under the Angkor influence around the 11th – 12th centuries.

Phitsanulok was originally named "Song Khwae" (lit. "Two Rivers") as it used to be situated between the Nan and Khwae Noi Rivers, although the Khwae Noi River now drains into the Nan River ten kilometers to the north of Phitsanulok. The Northern Chronicles credited the foundation of Song Khwae to "King Srithampidok" or King Thammaracha I of Sukhothai, on the east bank of Nan River. King Thammaracha I also constructed the Wat Phra Si Rattana Mahathat and cast famous Buddha images of Phra Buddha Chinnarat and Phra Buddha Chinnasri. Song Khwae eclipsed Sukhothai in importance, becoming the royal seat of Sukhothai Kingdom in 1378. After the demise of the last King of Sukhothai at Song Khwae in 1438, Prince Ramesuan of Ayutthaya came to rule Song Khwae. When Prince Ramesuan was crowned as King Trailokanat of Ayutthaya in 1448, Song Khwae and the Sukhothai Kingdom were incorporated into the Ayutthaya Kingdom.

The Ayutthaya annals call the town Chainat, where the Sukhothai inscriptions call it Song Khwae, until the two names were dropped in 1463. During the Ayutthaya-Lanna War, King Trailokanat moved his residence to Song Khwae in 1464 and renamed the city "Phitsanulok" (from Sanskrit Vishnu and Loka "world"). He expanded the city westward to the west bank of Nan River. Siroch Sittisombut dates the move to 1463, and describes it as joining Chainat and Song Khwae inside a single wall. In the sixteenth century, Phitsanulok was the seat of Uparaja or heir presumptive to Ayutthaya throne who took residence in the Chantana Palace on the west bank. In 1548, King Maha Chakkraphat appointed his supporter Phra Pirenthorathep as "King Thammaracha" of Phitsanulok as a tributary ruler. During the Burmese-Siamese Wars, Phitsanulok and the Sukhothai region became battlegrounds between Burma and Siam. When King Bayinnaung invaded Phitsanulok in 1563, King Thammaracha of Phitsanulok submitted to the Burmese.

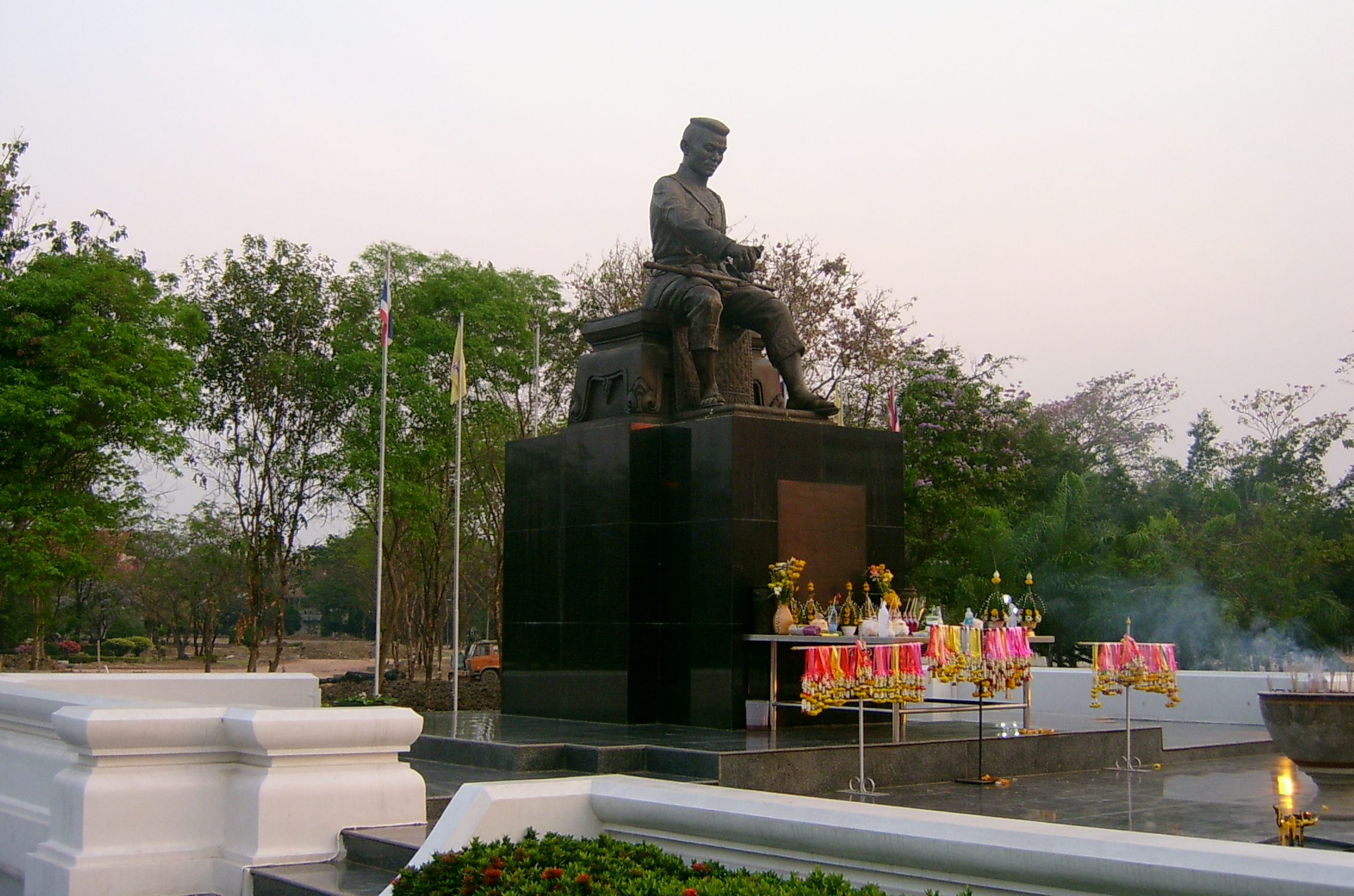
King Naresuan

King Thammaracha, now reigned at Ayutthaya, appointed his son Prince Naresuan as the Uparaja of Phitsanulok in 1570. In 1584, Prince Naresuan ordered the evacuation of all cities in the Sukhothai region including Phitsanulok down south in preparations against Burmese invasions. Phitsanulok was abandoned until it was later restored in 1593 not as a Uparaja seat but as a Muang Ek or first-level city held by a governor, becoming the center of Siamese administrations in northern regions. The governors of Phitsanulok held the title "Chao Phraya Surasi". After the Second Fall of Ayutthaya in 1767, Phitsanulok came under the rule of Chao Phra Fang, a monk who declared himself a local lord based on the town of Fang (modern Uttaradit). King Taksin of Thonburi sent forces to capture Phitsanulok in 1768 and appointed Boonma (later Prince Maha Sura Singhanat) as Chao Phraya Surasi the governor of Phitsanulok.

The Burmese General Maha Thiha Thura laid siege on Phitsanulok in 1775. Chao Phraya Chakri (future King Rama I) and his brother Chao Phraya Surasi Boonma held the city for four months until the city finally fell to the Burmese. Phitsanulok was utterly destroyed on this occasion. The Burmese invaded again in 1785 and Phitsanulok was abandoned temporarily because the manpower shortage left the city defenseless. After the series of warfare, Phitsanulok was in ruins and depopulated through the nineteenth century. The Phra Buddha Chinnasri image was moved to Wat Baworn Niwet in Bangkok in 1829. In 1834, the Phuan people were deported from Muang Phuan in Laos to re-populate Phitsanulok and surrounding cities. Phitsanulok slowly recovered to be an urban center.

As a part of reforms of King Chulalongkorn, Phitsanulok became the administrative seat of the monthon Phitsanulok in 1894. When the monthons were abolished in 1932, Phitsanulok became the capital of Phitsanulok Province.

Chaipong Samnieng, summarising Jiraporn Stapanawatana's social history of the town, describes a Free Thai organisation in Phitsanulok during the Second World War, built through the civil service and reaching Tak and Uttaradit. He reports that the Japanese troops stationed there entered the life of the town as employers and trading partners rather than only as enemies.

The Phitsanulok fire of 1957 destroyed much of the older portion of the city, which at the time consisted mostly of wooden buildings. On 28 November 1961, the King Naresuan Shrine was completed at Chandra Palace. On 25 January 1967, the Phitsanulok campus of what is now Naresuan University was established as the northern branch of the degree level College of Education. In 1974, the College of Education was upgraded as Srinakharinwirot University, with Phitsanulok as one of the six campuses. In 1990, the regional campuses became independent universities, and the Phitsanuloke campus was named after Phitsanulok-born King Naresuan the Great.

Naresuan Dam was constructed from 1976 to 1985 on the Nan River as part of the Phitsanulok Irrigation Project. The dam was designed to help prevent flooding of the city. On 8 March 1999 Phitsanulok was upgraded to city municipality (thesaban nakhon).

== Symbols ==
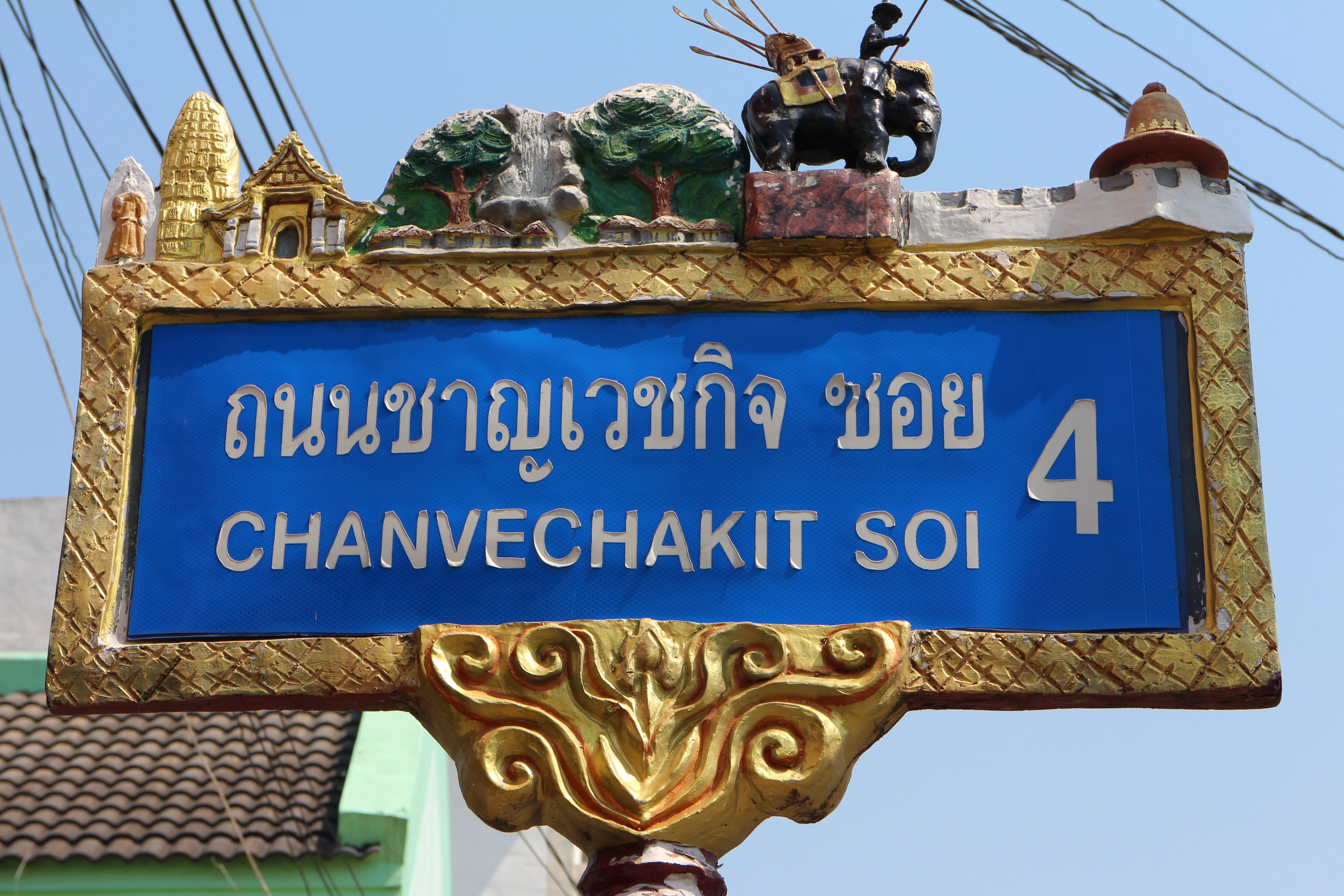
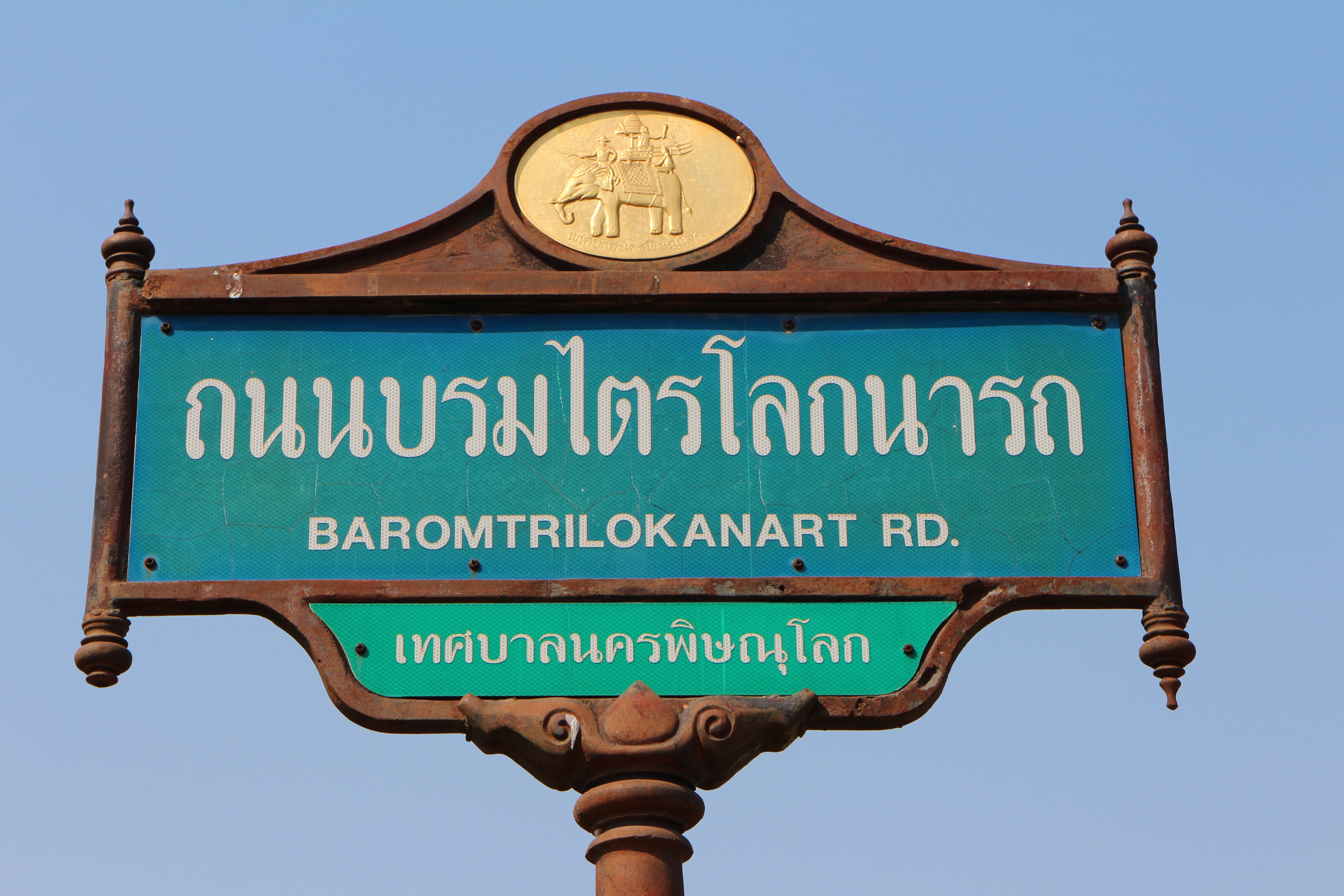
(left) Street sign up to the year 1999, (right) from the year 1999
- (photo left) From left to right: three figures symbolize Wat Yai: Phra Attharot, a 9 meter high standing Buddha image, the 36 meter high prang and the entrance gate of Vihara Luang, which enshrines Buddha Chinnarat; a nature park with a waterfall; for houseboats on the Nan river; King Naresuan riding his war elephant; hat-shaped tower.
- (photo right) above: Seal of Phitsanulok City depicts King Naresuan, shown riding his war elephant (yellow), bottom: Phitsanulok City (Thai: thesaban nakhon Phitsanulok) (green).

== Geography ==
=== Location ===
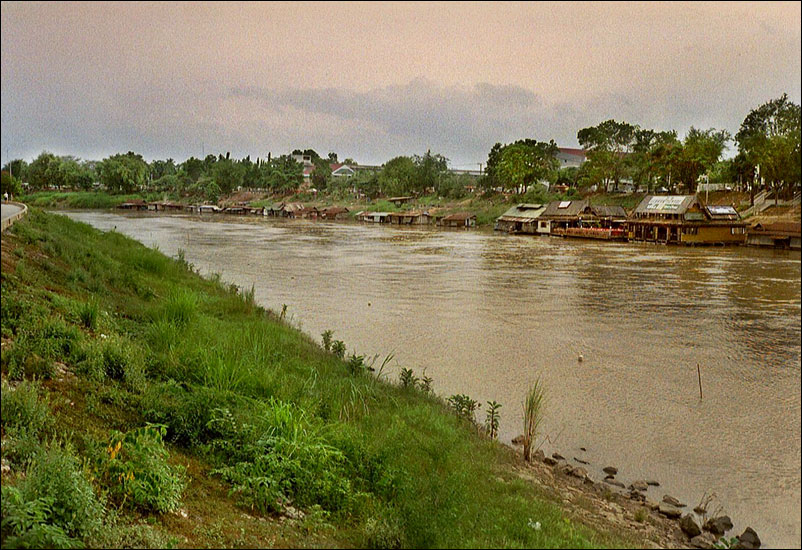
Nan River

Phitsanulok is in the north of Thailand. Phitsanulok is about 377 kilometres north of Bangkok by road. Phitsanulok covers some 777 square kilometres and borders Uttaradit and Laos to the north, and Loei and Phetchabun to the northeast. The south is adjacent to Phichit while the west is adjacent to Kamphaeng Phet Province and Sukhothai. Phitsanulok has many waterfalls, forests and caves. In the north is central area. In the north-west is a highland. It's the important recreational area such as Kaeng Sopha waterfall, Phu Hin Rong Kla and Phu Soi Dow. In the south plains along the Yom River and the Nan River is the most important agricultural district of Phitsanulok.

=== Topography ===
Phitsanulok lies primarily on flatland with some hills. The eastern portion of the city has some wooded area. The city is in the Nan Basin, which is part of the Chao Phraya watershed. Phitsanulok is sometimes called Song Kwae, the city of two rivers, a name dating to a time centuries ago when the Nan and Khwae Noi Rivers met near the city. Today, only the Nan River flows through Phitsanulok.

=== Climate ===
Phitsanulok has a tropical savanna climate (Köppen climate classification Aw). Winters are dry and very warm. Temperatures rise until April, which is very hot with the average daily maximum at 37.4 °C (99.3 °F). The monsoon season runs from May through October, with heavy rain and somewhat cooler temperatures during the day, although nights remain warm.

Climate data for Phitsanulok (1991–2020, extremes 1951-present)
Month	Jan	Feb	Mar	Apr	May	Jun	Jul	Aug	Sep	Oct	Nov	Dec	Year
Record high °C (°F)	36.3 (97.3)	38.4 (101.1)	40.5 (104.9)	42.8 (109.0)	42.7 (108.9)	39.4 (102.9)	37.6 (99.7)	36.7 (98.1)	35.7 (96.3)	35.7 (96.3)	36.4 (97.5)	35.7 (96.3)	42.8 (109.0)
Mean daily maximum °C (°F)	31.5 (88.7)	33.5 (92.3)	35.7 (96.3)	37.2 (99.0)	35.8 (96.4)	34.3 (93.7)	33.2 (91.8)	32.6 (90.7)	32.7 (90.9)	32.6 (90.7)	32.3 (90.1)	31.0 (87.8)	33.5 (92.4)
Daily mean °C (°F)	24.9 (76.8)	26.8 (80.2)	29.1 (84.4)	30.8 (87.4)	30.1 (86.2)	29.3 (84.7)	28.6 (83.5)	28.2 (82.8)	28.2 (82.8)	28.0 (82.4)	26.9 (80.4)	24.9 (76.8)	28.0 (82.4)
Mean daily minimum °C (°F)	19.2 (66.6)	20.8 (69.4)	23.7 (74.7)	25.4 (77.7)	25.4 (77.7)	25.2 (77.4)	24.8 (76.6)	24.7 (76.5)	24.7 (76.5)	24.1 (75.4)	22.0 (71.6)	19.4 (66.9)	23.3 (73.9)
Record low °C (°F)	7.5 (45.5)	10.0 (50.0)	12.7 (54.9)	17.4 (63.3)	20.4 (68.7)	21.0 (69.8)	21.5 (70.7)	21.4 (70.5)	21.7 (71.1)	17.1 (62.8)	12.1 (53.8)	8.9 (48.0)	7.5 (45.5)
Average precipitation mm (inches)	7.0 (0.28)	16.6 (0.65)	28.9 (1.14)	59.2 (2.33)	165.6 (6.52)	161.1 (6.34)	187.9 (7.40)	240.7 (9.48)	268.4 (10.57)	139.1 (5.48)	31.7 (1.25)	12.9 (0.51)	1,319.1 (51.93)
Average precipitation days (≥ 1.0 mm)	1.0	1.3	2.4	3.8	10.0	11.9	14.4	15.6	15.2	9.4	2.2	0.7	87.9
Average relative humidity (%)	69.1	66.1	64.4	63.6	71.3	76.1	78.6	80.7	81.6	78.7	72.6	69.0	72.7
Mean monthly sunshine hours	258.7	252.2	265.6	271.9	243.3	186.5	150.8	141.1	160.7	209.4	246.3	257.7	2,644.2
Mean daily sunshine hours	8.3	8.6	8.9	8.1	6.4	3.9	3.9	3.8	3.6	5.8	7.3	8.3	6.6
Source 1: World Meteorological Organization, (extremes)
Source 2: Office of Water Management and Hydrology, Royal Irrigation Department (sun 1981–2010)

== Administration ==
The administration of Phitsanulok City Municipality is responsible for an area that covers approximately 18.26 km^{2} (7.05 sq mi) and consists of only tambon Nai Mueang with 62,584 people and 37,507 households.

Map of Nai Mueang subdistrict

According to Municipal Act B.E. 2496 (1953, reviewed in 2003), the duties of the municipality include: clean water supply, waste and sewage disposal, communicable disease control, public training and education, public hospitals and electricity. The mayor, or the highest executive, is directly elected by the eligible voters in the municipal area. The mayor serves a four-year term and is assisted by no more than four deputy mayors appointed directly by the mayor. The Municipal Council is the legislative body of the municipality. It has the power to issue ordinances by laws, that do not contradict the laws of the country. The municipal council's jurisdiction applies to all people living in the municipal area.
There are a total of 64 communities (chumchon), divided into four groups. Although not directly chosen by the local citizens, they provides advice and recommendations to the local administrative organization.

Four groups of communities

== Demographics ==
=== Ethnic diversity ===
The majority ethnicity in the city is Thai. Others in the city consider themselves of Mon descent.

=== Language ===
The majority of residents of Phitsanulok speak central Thai.

=== Religion ===
The people of Phitsanulok are predominantly Theravada Buddhists (as are 95% of the Thai population as a whole), with a small Christian community and a few Muslim families.

== Education ==
=== Educational institutions ===
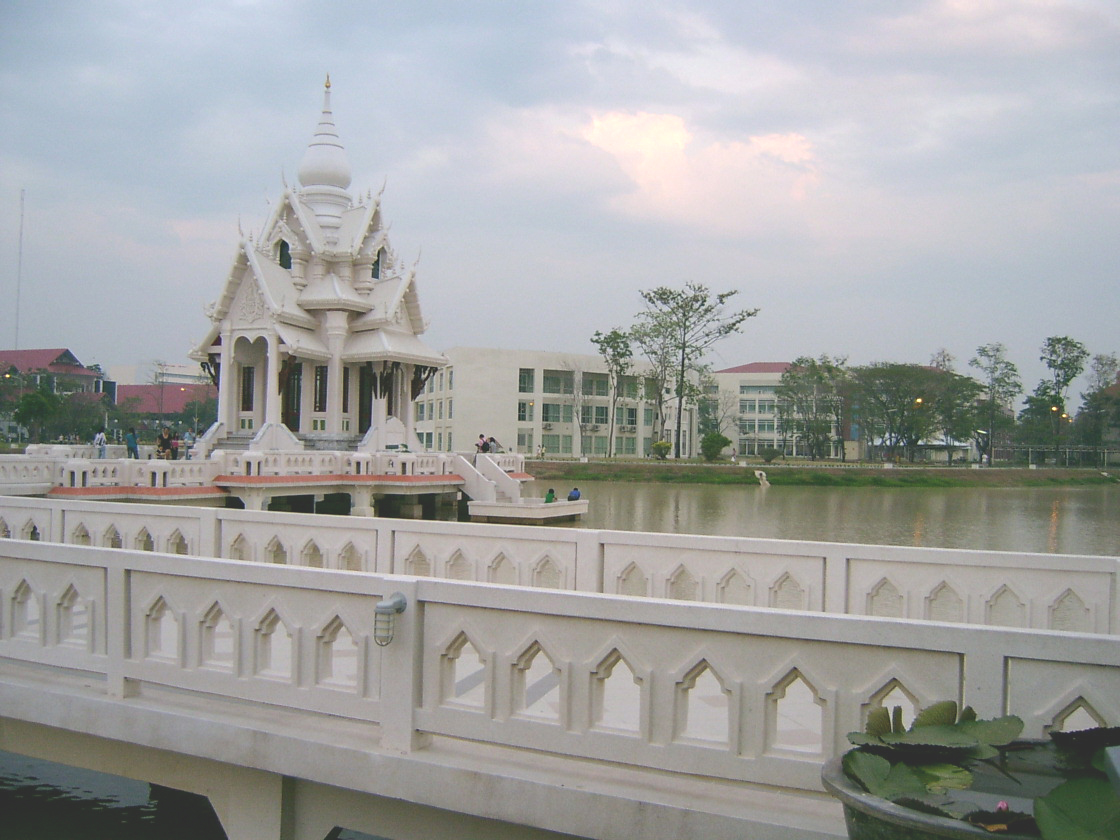
Naresuan University

Naresuan University (abbreviated Mor Nor for Mahawithayalai Naresuan) is an educational center of the lower northern region of Thailand. Now in Tha Pho, near the city of Phitsanulok, the university was named after King Naresuan the Great, and the campus features a large statue of him. Other universities and colleges in or around the city include Phitsanulok University (private), Sirindhorn College of Public Health, Rajabhat Pibulsongkram University (formerly a teacher training college), and the Phitsanulok campus of the Rajamangala University of Technology Lanna.

=== Vocational institutions ===
There are three vocational colleges in the city:

- Phitsanulok Technical College.
- Phitsanulok Vocational College.
- Songkwae Technical College

=== Secondary (Mathayom) institutions ===
Phitsanulok City is home to three secondary institutions:

- Chalermkwansatree School
- Janokrong school.
- Puttha Chinnarat Pitthaya school.

== Healthcare ==
There is one government hospital in Phitsanulok City: Buddhachinaraj Phitsanulok Hospital with 1,000 beds.
There are also five private hospitals with 400 beds total:

- Bangkok Hospital Phitsanulok
- Phitsanulok Hospital
- Pitsanuvej Hospital
- Ruamphaet Hospital
- Radiotherapy and Nuclear Medicine Hospital

== Infrastructure ==
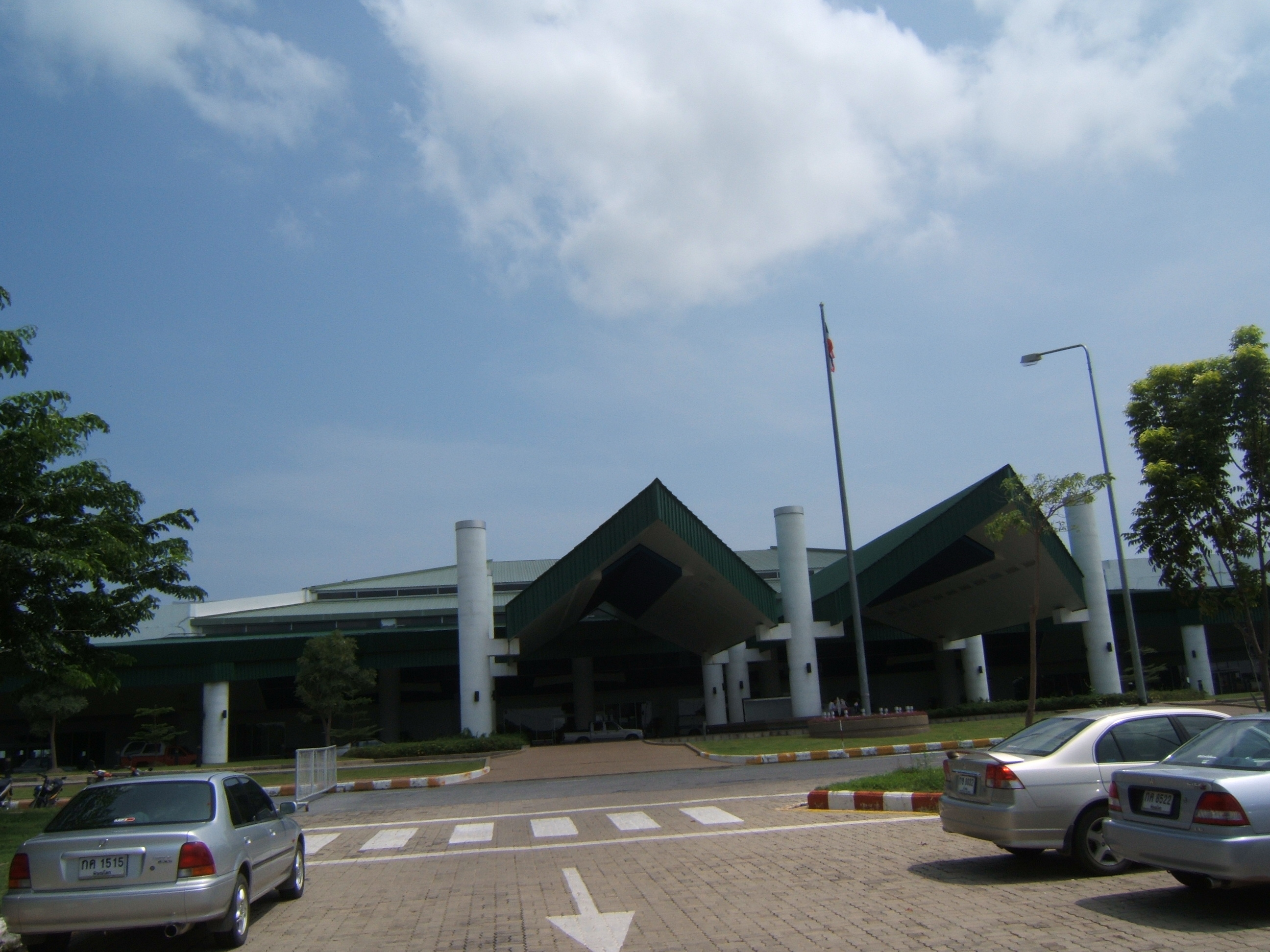
Phitsanulok Airport

=== Airport ===
Close to the city center (Aranyik), Phitsanulok Airport receives up to six flights a day from Bangkok (flight time approximately 60 minutes), which are operated by three airlines: Nok Air, Thai Air Asia and Thai Lion Air.

=== Roads ===
Road 126, a multi-lane by-pass, lets through-traffic avoid the city. It connects to highway 11, which runs north to Uttaradit and Lampang and south to Sing Buri. It also meets highway 12, east to Phetchabun and west to Sukhothai, Tak and Mae Sot, and highway 117 south to Nakhon Sawan.

=== Buses ===
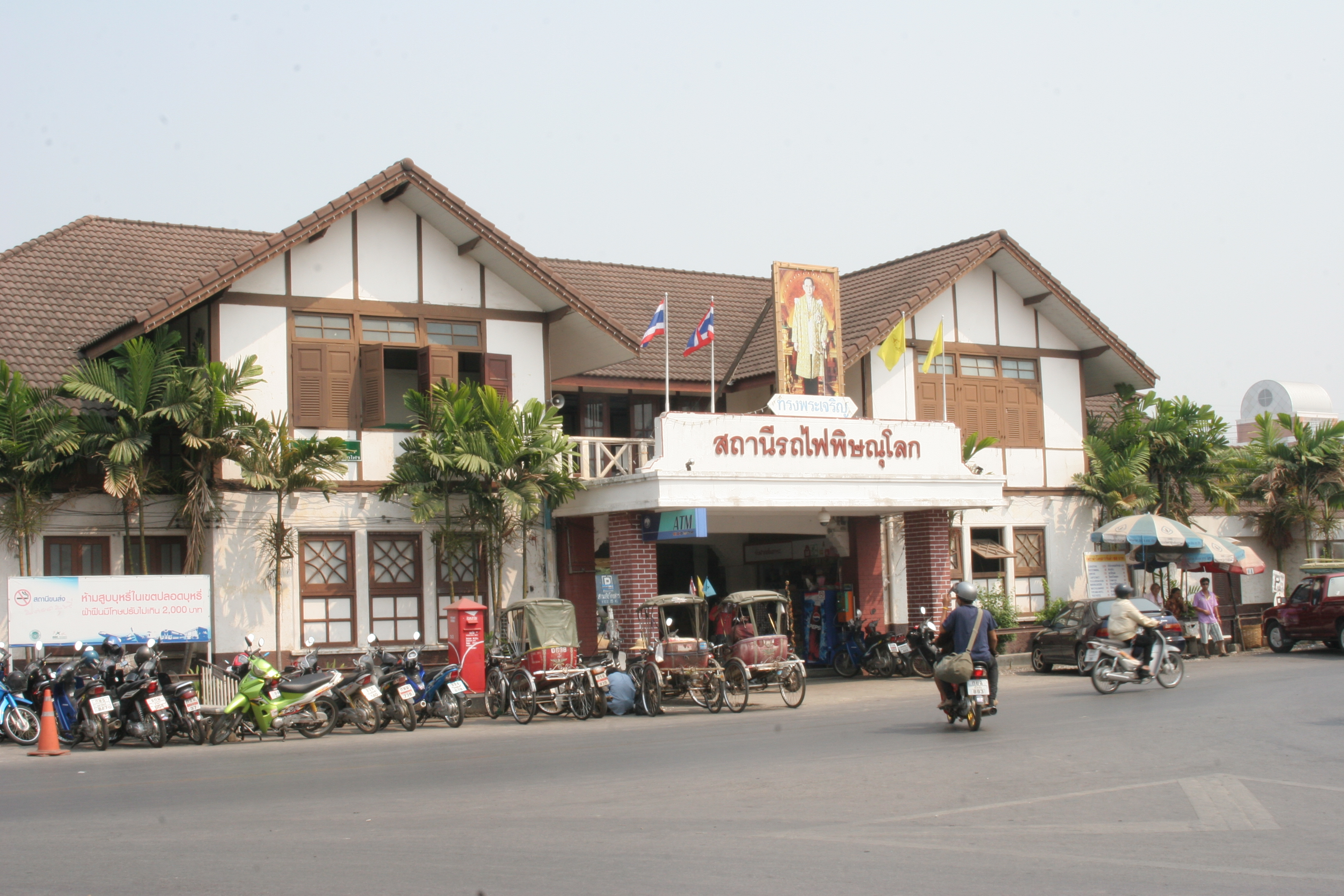
Phitsanulok Railway Station

Phitsanulok Terminal 1 (Saen Phon Phai) and Terminal 2 (Samo Khae) provide the mass transport throughout Phitsanulok Province by some eight bus companies. Four minibus lines provide transportation around the city. Yanyon tour operates its own private bus station (Sua Thim) with only a busline to Bangkok.

=== Railway ===
In the city center, Phitsanulok railway station mainly receives intercity trains on the Northern Line, operated by State Railway of Thailand, more than a dozen trains running in each direction each day.

=== Media ===
The main channels for communication in the city are television and radio. The following public television and radio stations are broadcast from Phitsanulok:

- Sathaanii Witthayu Krajaisiang Thahaan Aakaat (Air Force Radio Station), 954 AM and 95.75, in the City of Phitsanulok
- Witthayu Kong Phon Thahaan Raap Thii Sii (4th Infantry Division), 1377 AM, at Fort Somdet Phra Naresuan Maharat
- Sathaanii Witthayu Phitaksantiraat (Communications Division, Royal Thai Police), 1422 AM, in Phitsanulok City
- ARMY-5 (television channel 5, owned and operated by the Royal Thai Army)
- PRD-11 (television channel 11, owned and operated by the Government Public Relations Department)

=== Royal Thai Army ===
Phitsanulok is home to the Third Army Region of the Royal Thai Army, responsible for the northern and north-western parts of the kingdom.

== Temples ==
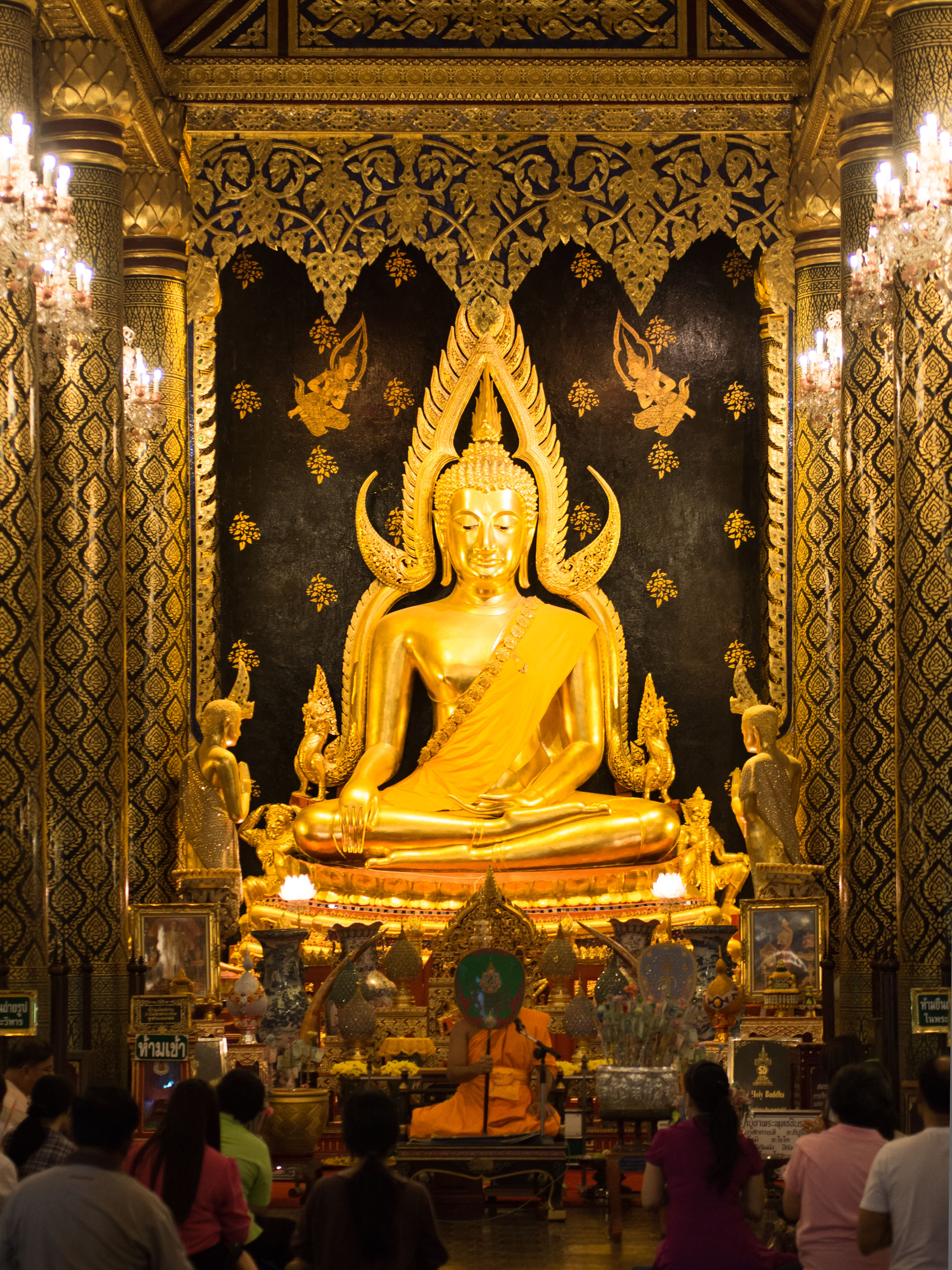
Phra Buddha Chinnarat

=== Wat Phra Sri Rattana Mahathat ===
Phitsanulok's main tourist attraction is Wat Phra Sri Rattana Mahathat, known locally simply as Wat Yai (Thai: วัดใหญ่) (the big temple). This famous temple, built in 1357, is home to the Phra Buddha Chinnarat, which is one of the most revered Buddha figures in Thailand, and the official symbol of Phitsanulok Province. The beautiful mother-of-pearl inlaid doors were built in 1756 by order of King Boromakot of Ayutthaya. The Buddha Chinnarat National Museum, on the temple grounds, houses a sizeable collection of Sukhothai period art.

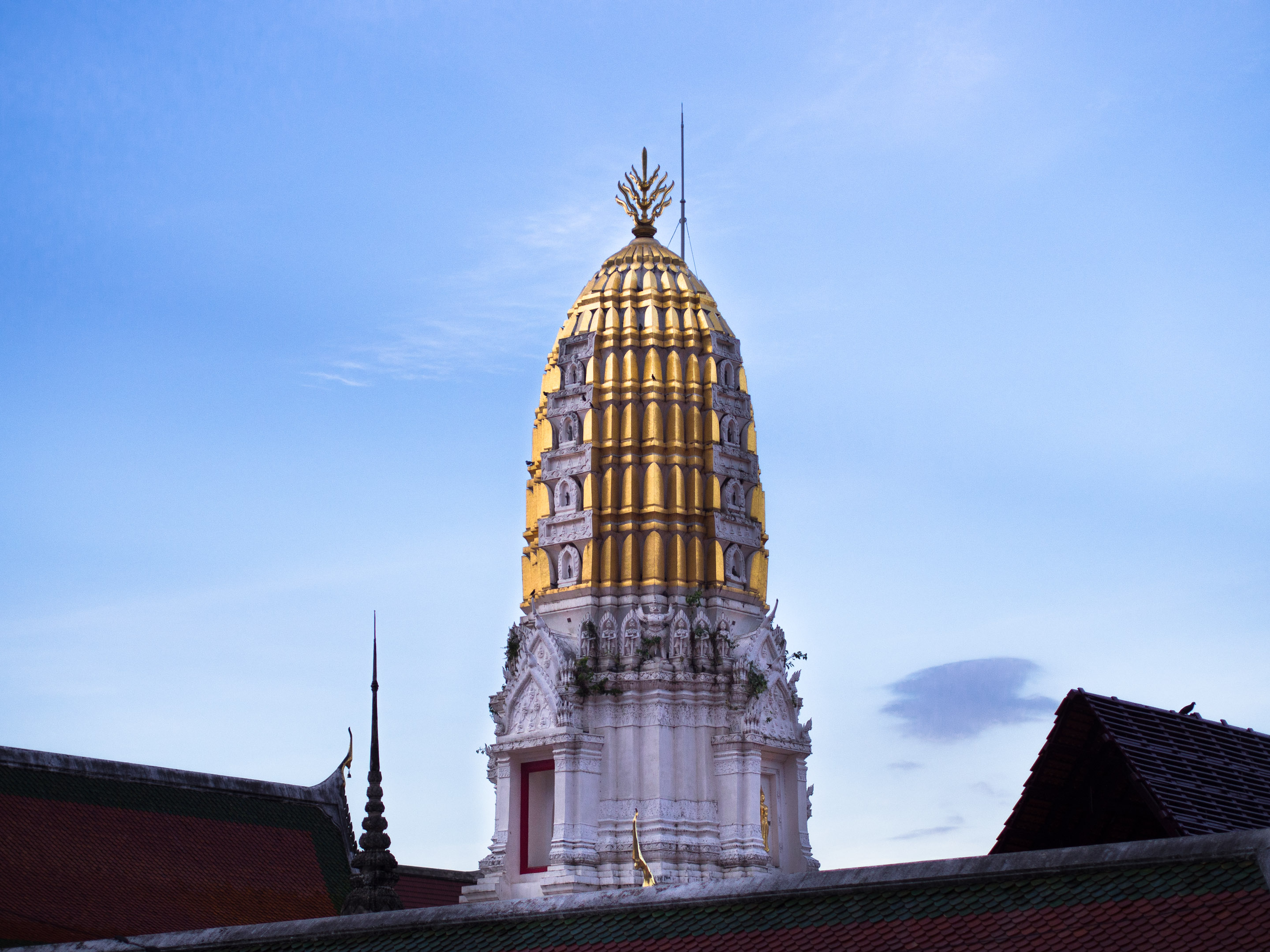
Gilded top of the temple's Prang

=== Other temples ===
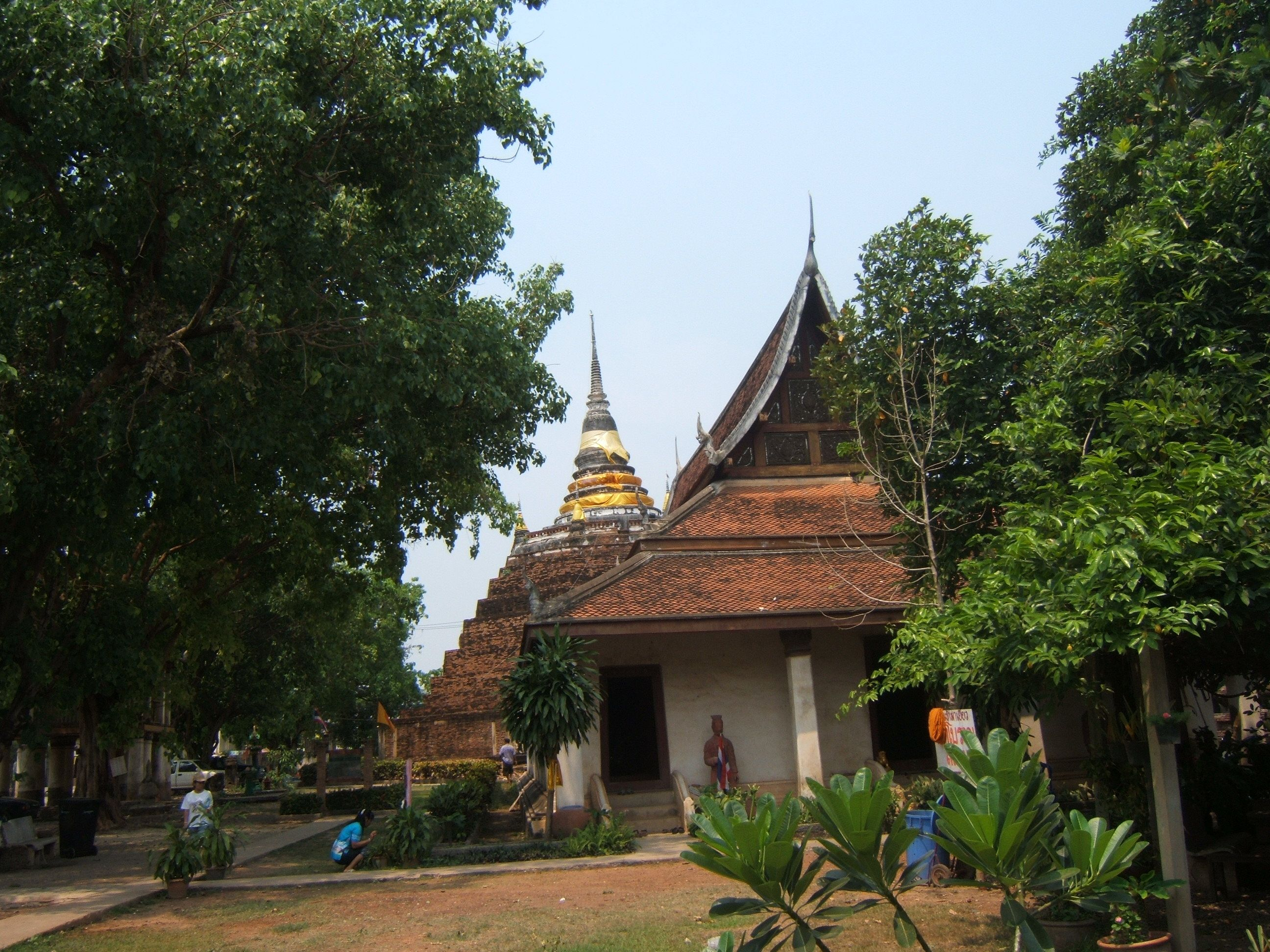
Wat Ratchaburana

The city is also home to the following temples where Theravada Buddhism is practiced by city residents (from north clockwise):

- Wat Tammachak (Thai: วัดธรรมจักร)
- Wat Chedi Yod Thong (Thai: วัดเจดีย์ยอดทอง)
- Wat Aranyik (Thai: วัดอรัญญิก)
- Wat Nang Phaya (Thai: วัดนางพญา), not a temple but a monastery
- Wat Ratcha Burana (Thai: วัดราชบูรณะ)
- Wat Mai Opai Yaram (Thai: วัดใหม่อภัยาราม)
- Wat Si Wisut Tharam (Thai: วัดศรีวิสุทธาราม)
- Wat Nong Bua Mai (Thai: วัดหนองบัวหม่อ)
- Wat Tha Maprang (Thai: วัดท่ามะปราง)
- Wat Sa Kaew Phatum Thong (Thai: วัดสระแก้วปทุมทอง)
- Wat Chan Tawan Ook (Thai: วัดจันทร์ตะวันออก)
- Wat Chan Tawan Tok (Thai: วัดจันทร์ตะวันตก)
- Wat Phan Pee (Thai: วัดพันปี)
- Wat Kuha Sawan (Thai: วัดคูหาสวรรค์)

== Sports ==
Dragon boat racing has historically been an important element of Phitsanulok culture. In recent times, football (soccer) has become increasingly popular. In 2005, Phitsanulok won the 2nd Northern Youth Football Championship in the U12 and U15 age groups.

Traditional Thai boxing is also a major sport in the city.

== Culture ==
=== Art ===
Phitsanulok is home to a number of historic sculptures of the Buddha and other religious artwork including the Buddha Chinnarat, the Buddha Chinnasi, the Phra Si Satsada.

=== Literature ===
Examples of important literary works of Phitsanulok include:

- Lilit Yuan Pai (Thai: ลิลิตยวนพ่าย, English: Tale of the Fall of Lanna)
- Lilit Prá Lô (Thai: ลิลิตพระลอ, English: Tale of the Hero Lô)
- Klohng Táwâatsàmàat (Thai: โคลงทวาทศมาส, English: Poem of the Twelve Months)
- Gam Sŏn Sĕe Bpràat (Thai: กำศรวลศรีปราชญ์, English: The Legendary Wise Archer's Grip)

The predominant literary language (as well as the predominant spoken language) is the central Thai dialect of the Thai language, which is written in the Thai alphabet.

== Other attractions ==
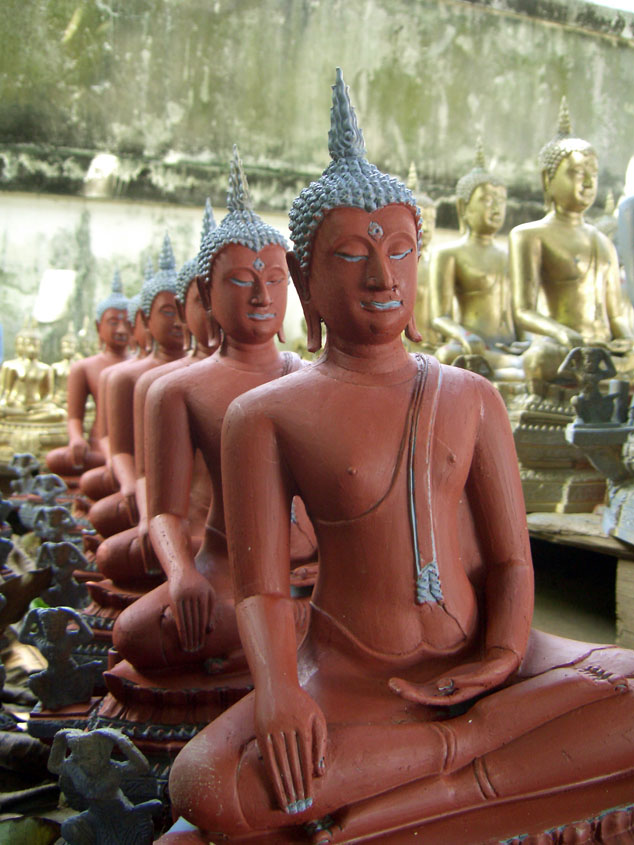
Buranathai Buddha Foundry

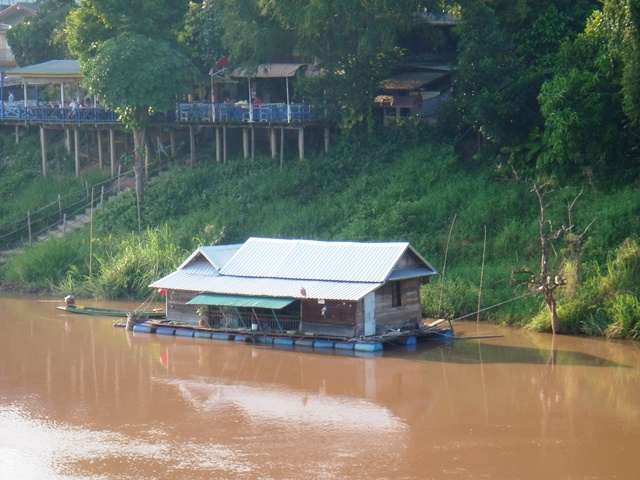
Houseboat, Phitsanulok

- Buranathai Buddha Foundry: Specializes in casting bronze Buddha images. It is the only establishment of its kind in the province. Craftspersons specialize in the reproduction of the Phra Buddha Chinnarat Buddha image. Visitors are permitted to walk along the production line.
- Sergeant-Major Dr. Thawee Buranakhet Folklore Museum: Hosts a collection of folk arts, crafts, basketry, pottery and ancient kitchen utensils. The museum also houses a collection of antique traps for catching snakes, birds, tigers and porcupines.
- City walls: Most of the older portions of Phitsanulok were destroyed in a 1955 fire. Thus little else remains of the old town besides the famous temple, an ancient chedi across the road from it, and a small section of the city wall. The intact portion of the ancient city wall is accessible to visitors.
- Night Market: Each evening, vendors gather to form Phitsanulok's night market. Items sold include clothing and food, usually at reduced prices.
- Chan Palace was the birthplace of King Naresuan the Great, and contains a shrine to him.
- Naresuan University Art and Culture Gallery: The gallery holds over 100 artistic artworks of culturally significant Thai artists.
- Nan River Houseboats: Phitsanulok is known throughout Thailand for the houseboats which still line the Nan River near Wat Phra Sri Rattana Maharat, though in recent years these are becoming fewer. A houseboat museum is open to visitors.

== Festivals and events ==
- Phra Buddha Chinnarat Fair: Held each January at Wat Phra Sri Rattana Mahatat Woramahawihan.
- Suan Chom Nan Park Festival: Held twice a year along the Nan River. Food and local products are on sale.
- Dragon Boat Races: On the first weekend of each October, dragon boat races are held outside Wat Phra Sri Rattana Mahatat Woramahawihan in the Nan River. Each dragon boat has a crew of approximately 30 oarsmen.
