= Wat Aranyik, Phitsanulok =

Thai historic temple

Coordinates: 16°49′35″N 100°16′41″E

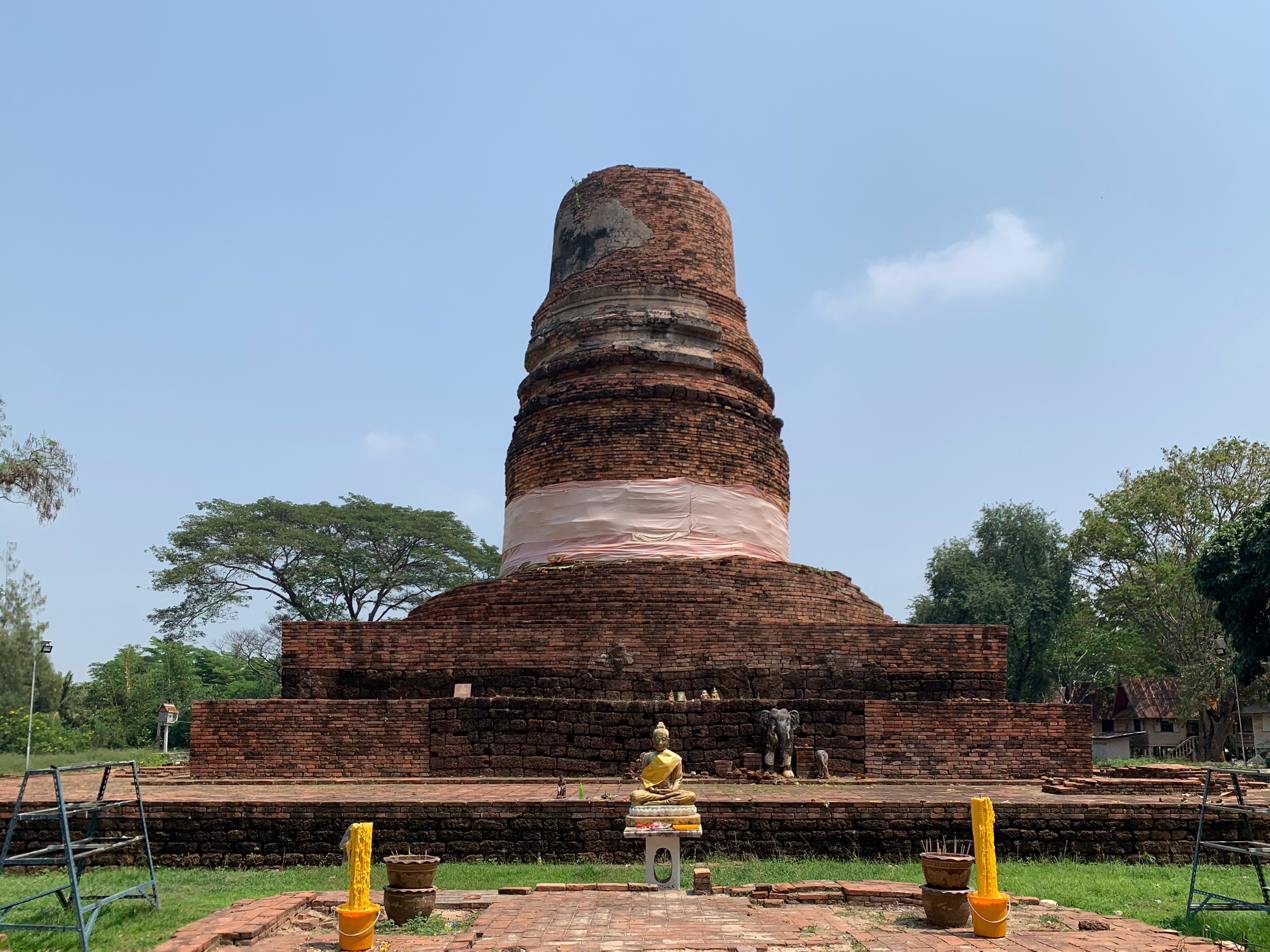
Main Stupa of Wat Aranyik, Phitsanulok, Thailand.

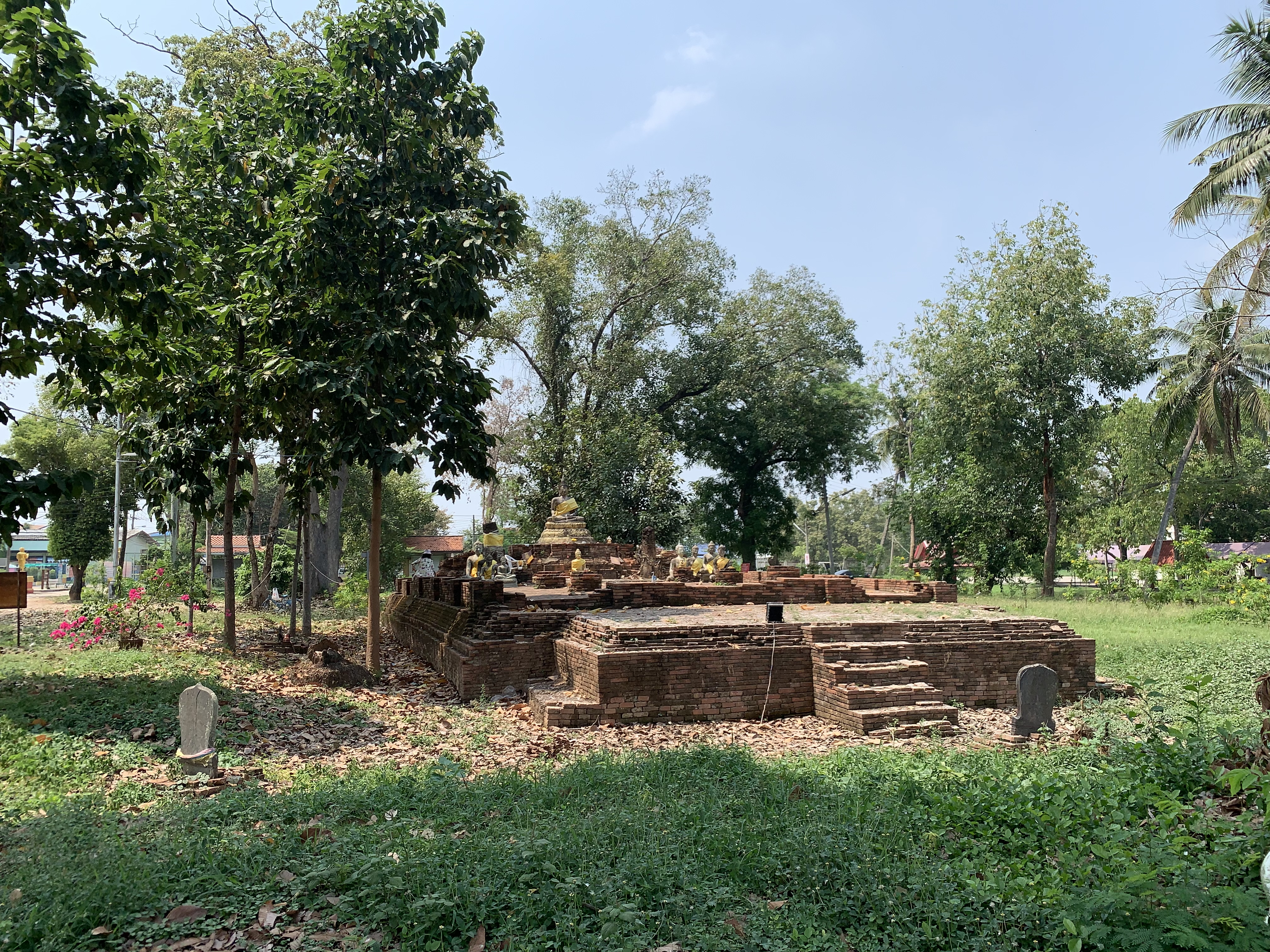
Possible former vihara of Wat Aranyik, Phitsanulok, Thailand.

Wat Aranyik (Thai: วัดอรัญญิก) is a historic temple in Phitsanulok, Thailand.

== History ==
Wat Aranyik was constructed during the Sukhothai Period.

== Features ==
On the temple grounds, there is a modern temple with a monastery and modern temple buildings. There is also a large area of ruins where the old temple of the Sukhothai period once stood. Still standing from the original temple's construction are a historic chedi and a number of Buddha images. A unique feature of the temple is that it is surrounded by moats.
