= Saen Phonlaphai =

Weapon used in Thailand

The Saen Phonlaphai (Thai: แสนพลพ่าย; IPA: [sɛːn˩˩˦ pʰon˧.lä(ʔ)˦˥ pʰäːj˥˩]) is a scythe that was among the royal weaponry of Siam and represented the authority of the monarch. The scythe was a well-known weapon that had been used in the Battle of Nong Sarai.

According to the record, King Naresuan, riding his royal war elephant Chao Phraya Chaiyanuphap (Thai: เจ้าพระยาไชยานุภาพ), sought out Prince Minchit Sra whilst fighting ferociously through ranks of enemy soldiers. When their elephants met, both leaders fought hand-to-hand, standing on the heads of their elephants and lunging at each other with sword and lance. It is said that the elephant duel was so ferocious that soldiers of both armies stopped fighting in order to stare at the spectacle. Finally, Naresuan's sword cut through his opponent's body from shoulder to hip, and Siam had won the day. Without a leader, the Burmese stopped fighting and retreated to Pegu. King Naresuan became a hero, and the date of the battle, January 18, is observed as Royal Thai Armed Forces Day.

Since the elephant battle, the scythe was given the title Chao Phraya Saen Phonlaphai, which means 'Chao Phraya Who Defeated Hundred Thousand Forces'.

The scythe had a special functionality; the hook and blade were combined, which also had specific uses when riding an elephant against another elephant. The blade was made of steel while the body was made from metal or hardwood and decorated with enamel, gold and fine larch. In times past, warriors who used it had to be specially trained in the Thai traditional battle style for high-ranking men.
