= Don Chedi Monument =

Monument in Suphan Buri Province, Thailand

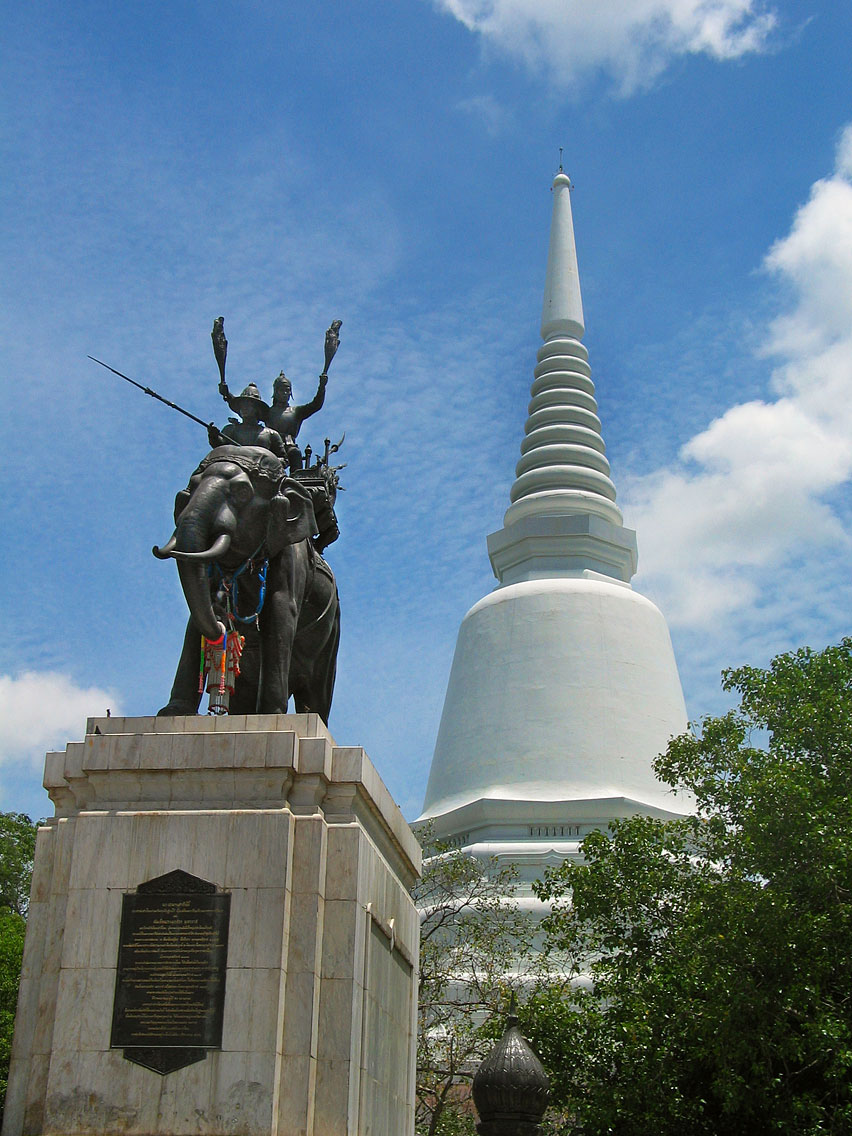
Don Chedi Monument

The Don Chedi Monument (Thai: พระบรมราชานุสรณ์ดอนเดจีย์, RTGS: Phra Boromma Rachanuson Don Chedi) is a royal memorial Don Chedi district , Suphan Buri province, Thailand, built to commemorate King Naresuan of Ayutthaya's legendary 1593 victorious elephant duel over the Burmese uparaja Mingyi Swa in the battle of Nong Sarai. It was built on the site of a ruined chedi (stupa), believed to have originally been erected by Naresuan, and comprises a new chedi covering the ruins, and a statue of Naresuan mounted on his war elephant.

The search for the site's location was initiated by the historian Prince Damrong Rajanubhab following the discovery of the Luang Prasoet Chronicle, which identified the site of the duel as a place called Nong Sarai. The ruins were discovered by the Governor of Suphan Buri in 1913, and King Vajiravudh made a pilgrimage to the site in January 1914. Plans were made to build a new chedi to house the ruins, but this was shelved due to the poor economy. The project was later revived in 1950 by the government of Plaek Pibulsonggram, and the memorial, with the new chedi and the royal statue designed by Silpa Birasri, was opened in 1959 during the government of Sarit Thanarat.

The identification of the site has been disputed, most significantly by proponents of a different site in Kanchanaburi province's Phanom Thuan district. The debate gained national attention around 1972–1973, but was shut down as the country slid back into dictatorship following the 6 October 1976 massacre. Other dissenters question the existence of a historical stupa altogether, citing either disagreement between sources or the fact that the historicity of the duel itself is disputed by Burmese chronicles.
