= Wanchana Sawasdee =

Thai army officer and actor

Lieutenant General Wanchana Sawasdee
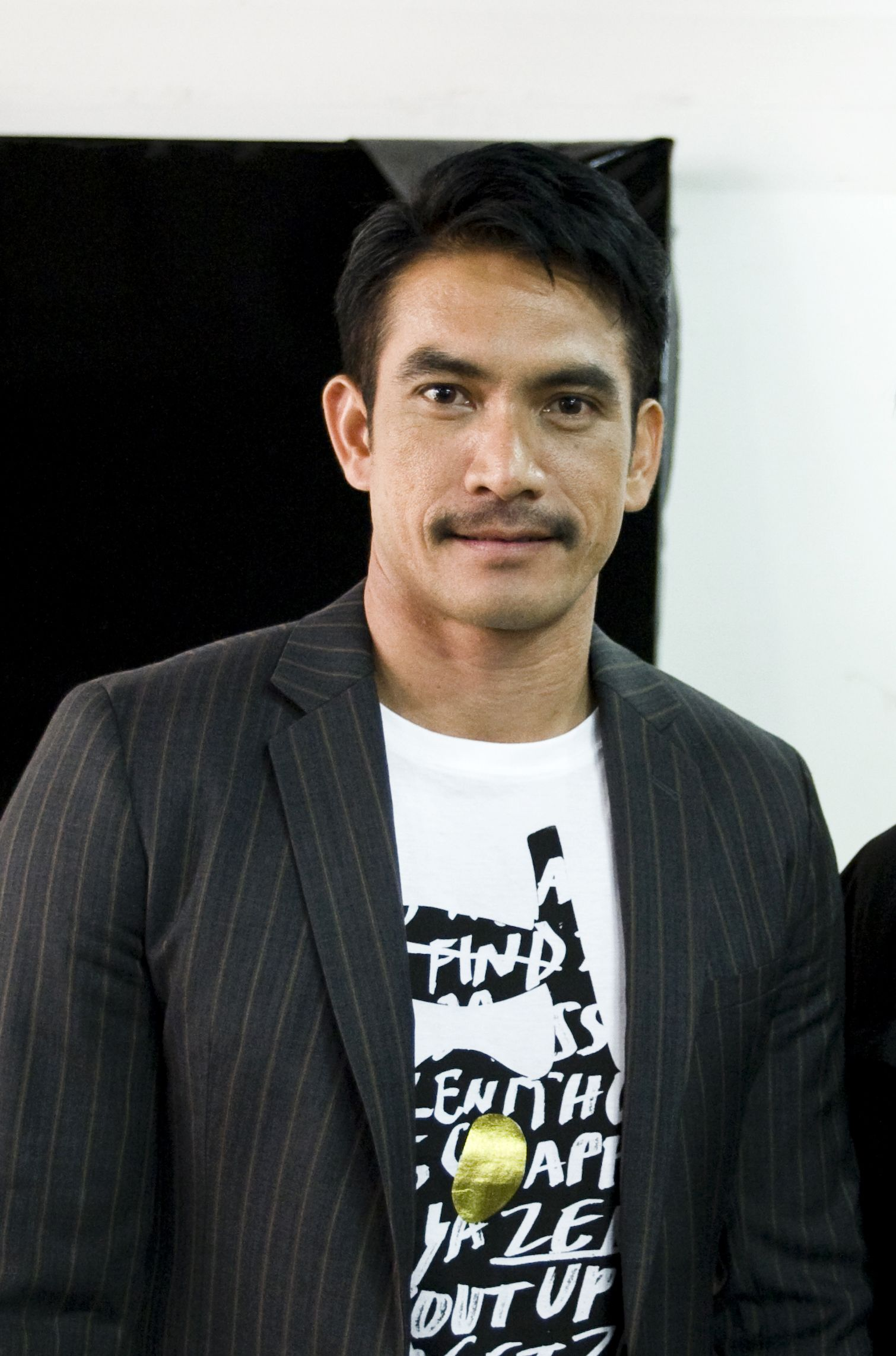
- Born: August 26, 1972 (age 53)
- Other name: Bird
- Occupations: Actor, Military soldier
- Military career
- Allegiance: Thailand
- Branch: Thai Armed Forces
- Service years: 1997–present
- Rank: Lieutenant General

Lieutenant General Wanchana Sawasdee (born August 26, 1972) Nickname: Bird is a Thai army officer and actor. Currently serves as the Deputy Spokesperson of the Royal Thai Armed Forces Headquarters and a member of the Flood Emergency Situation Management Center. Spokesperson for the Flood Emergency Situation Management Center and advisor to the National Defence College. Former Chief of Staff to the Deputy Chief of Staff, Royal Thai Armed Forces Headquarters. A former military officer in the Secretariat of the Permanent Secretary of the Ministry of Defence, former deputy spokesperson of the Ministry of Defence, former deputy director of the Public Relations Division of the Permanent Secretary of the Ministry of Defence, former judge of the Bangkok Military Court, and former staff officer to the Commander-in-Chief of the Armed Forces, he gained fame for his portrayal of King Naresuan the Great in King Naresuan franchise.

== Biography ==
Wanchana Sawasdee was born in Ngao District, Lampang Province. His father, Colonel Aran Sawasdee, was of Thai Chinese descent, and his mother, Naruemon Sawasdee, was of Thai Indian descent. He has a younger brother, Police Lieutenant Colonel Wansawang Sawasdee, who is a former national team athlete in the discus throw. The family practices Buddhism. The family later moved to Kanchanaburi Province, where Wanchana grew up.

Wanchana graduated secondary from Visuttharangsi School and later from the Royal Thai Armed Forces Preparatory School, Class 34. He earned a Bachelor of Engineering in Industrial Engineering from the Chulachomklao Royal Military Academy (CRMA), Class 45, alongside Captain Rachata Pisitbannakorn, a former Member of Parliament for Bangkok representing the Thai Rak Thai Party, and Group captain Jongjet Wacharanan. He also completed a master's degree in Communication Arts from Krirk University.

Wanchana served as an operations and training officer with the 19th Cavalry Battalion at Surasri Camp, Mueang Kanchanaburi District, Kanchanaburi Province. He later joined the Army Civil Affairs Division at the Royal Thai Army Headquarters, where he served as Head of Psychological Operations (PsyOps) and concurrently as Deputy Army Spokesperson. He was subsequently appointed Battalion Commander of the Royal Guard Cadet Regiment at the Chulachomklao Royal Military Academy. He later held the positions of deputy director of Public Relations at the Office of the Permanent Secretary of the Ministry of Defence and Staff Officer to the Commander-in-Chief of the Armed Forces. He currently serves as Advisor to the National Defence College and Deputy Spokesperson of the Royal Thai Armed Forces Headquarters.

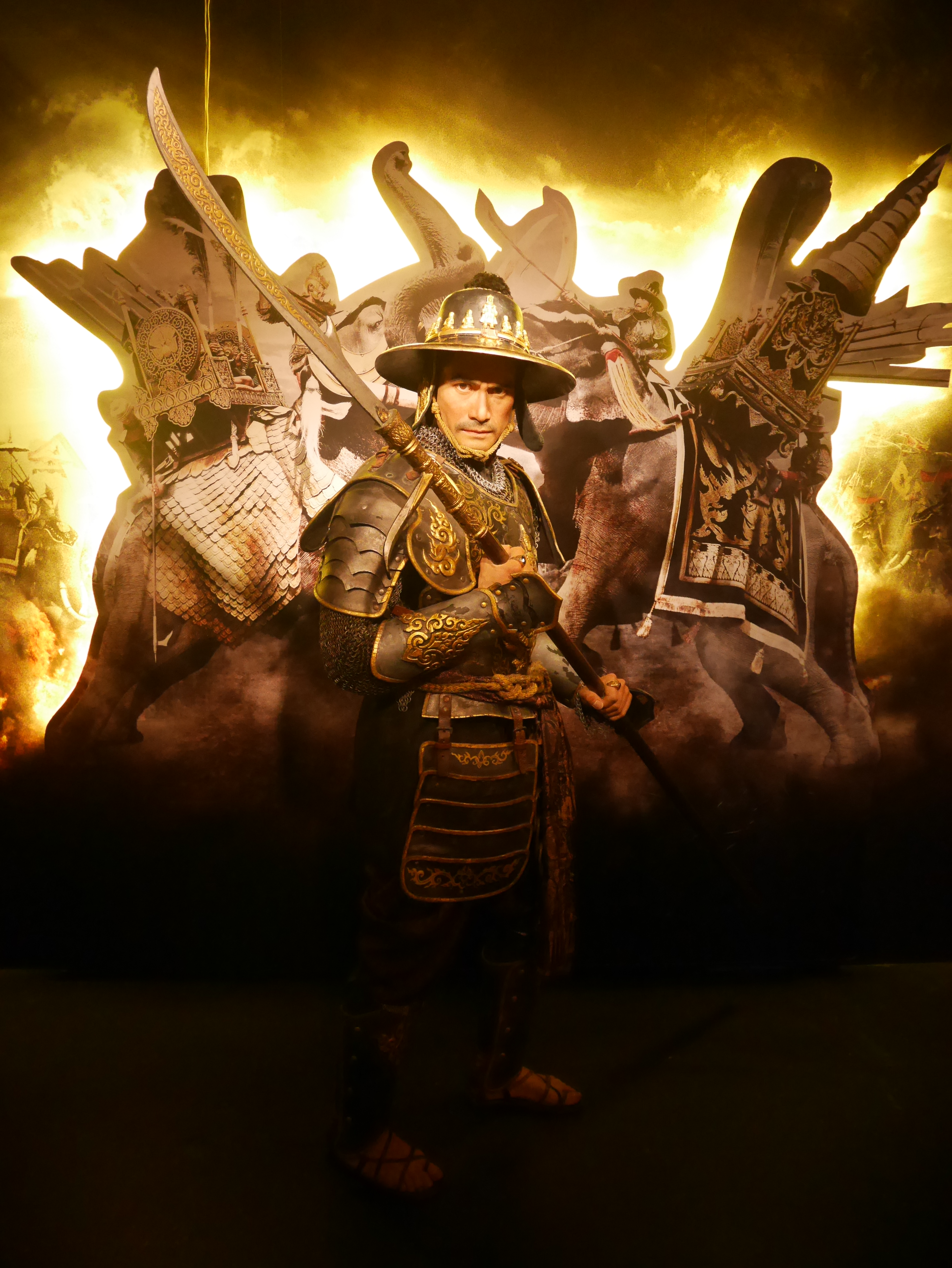
Wax statue of Wanchana Sawatdee as King Naresuan the Great at the wax museum Madame Tussauds Bangkok.

Wanchana entered the acting industry after being selected by Mom Chao Chatrichalerm Yukol to portray King Naresuan the Great in King Naresuan. Mom Chao Chatrichalerm specifically sought an actor who was an active military officer, and Wanchana subsequently underwent nine months of acting training for the role. He became widely known by the nickname “Colonel Bird.” In interviews, Wanchana stated that he intended to work in the entertainment industry only following this film and did not plan to pursue a full-time acting career, as he intended to return to military service. Although he continuously to appear in the entertainment industry, he eventually ceased accepting acting roles as his military rank and responsibilities increased.
