= Battle of Nong Sarai =

Battle between the Toungoo Dynasty of Burma and the Ayutthaya Kingdom of Siam

- Part of the Burmese–Siamese War (1584–1593)
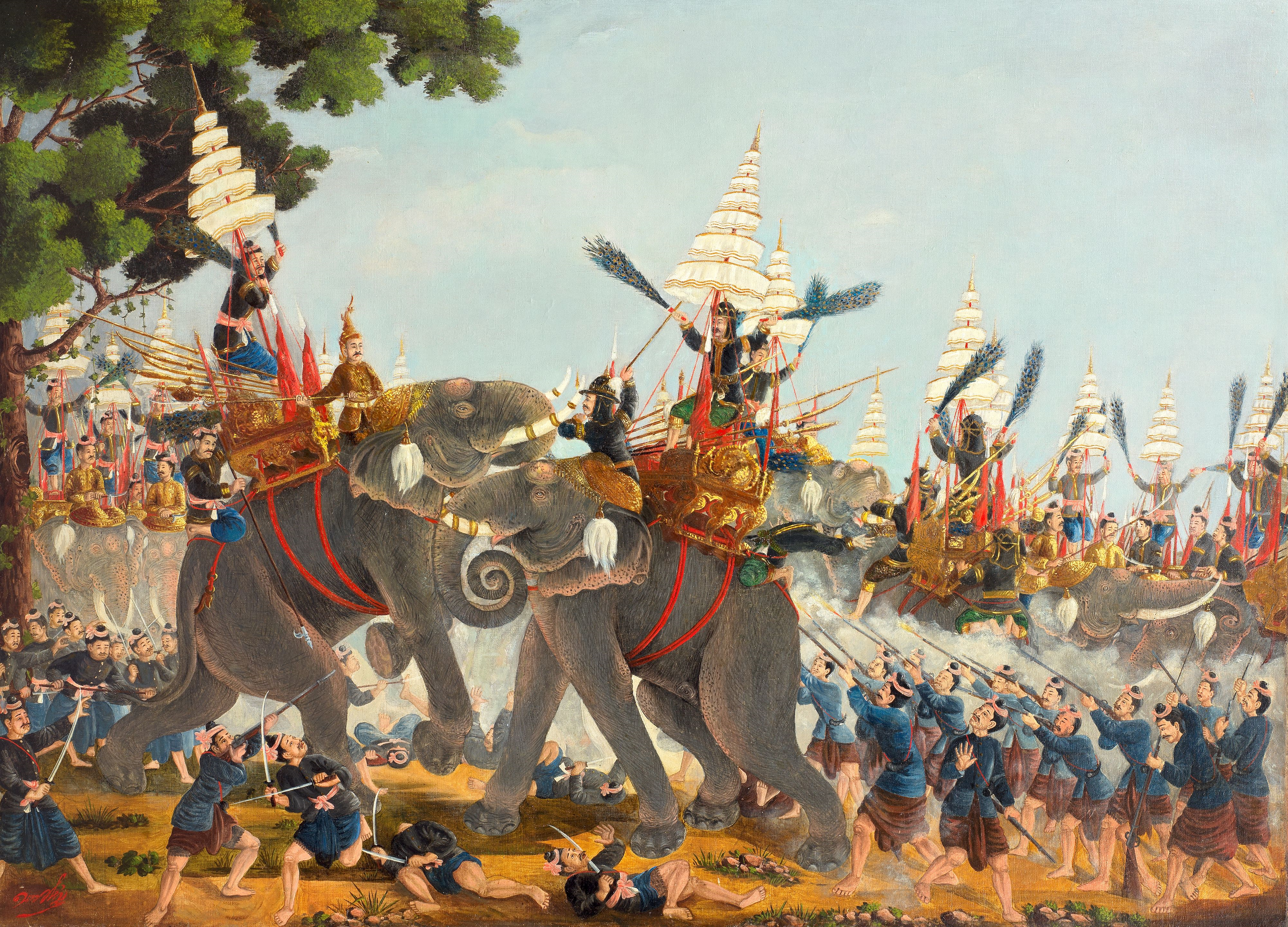
- Painting depicting the battle from c. 1880
Date	18 January 1593
Location	Nong Sarai, Siam
Result	Siamese (Ayutthaya) victory

Belligerents
Kingdom of Ayutthaya	Toungoo dynasty

Commanders and leaders
Naresuan; Ekathotsarot	Mingyi Swa †; Mangcacharo †

The Battle of Nong Sarai was a Siamese (Thai) victory against the Burmese in 1593, which led to the end of the 1584-1593 Burmese-Siamese War and Siamese independence from Burmese vassalage. The battle is most famous for a supposed elephant duel where Naresuan, King of Ayutthaya, slew Mingyi Swa, heir (uparaja) to the Burmese throne. Due to limited sources and evidence, many details of the battle are uncertain - such as where it occurred - and the authenticity of many accounts have been questioned by historians. All sources do agree that a battle did happen between the two kingdoms in which Swa was killed.

The Toungoo dynasty of Burma had forced the Ayutthaya Kingdom into vassalage twice after two wars, first after 1564 then after 1569. Upon the return of Prince Naret (later called Naresuan), a rebellion against the Burmese were organised. Swa was sent by his father King Nanda Bayin with command over an army to suppress Naresuan's revolt. After a confrontation, Swa was killed and Siamese sovereignty was reaffirmed. Many aspects are unknown or contested. Based on findings by Prince Damrong Rajanubhab, it was believed the battle occurred in modern-day Suphanburi province but Kanchanaburi province has been proposed as an alternative location. Many sources also do not mention an elephant duel between Swa and Naresuan. If an elephant duel did occur, it would've been among the last as Southeast Asian nations westernised their armies to use firearms, making duels obsolete.

== Background ==
In the Burmese-Siamese War of 1563-1564, King Bayinnaung of the Toungoo dynasty of Burma attempted to force the neighbouring Kingdom of Ayutthaya into submission. The Siamese surrendered when the Burmese laid siege to Ayutthaya, their capital city, and entered a period of vassalage to Burma. Siam's vassalage was confirmed following the fall of Ayutthaya in the Burmese-Siamese War of 1568-1569. Prince Naret (who later became known as Naresuan) was forcibly sent to Burma as a royal hostage following the 1563-1564 war. By 1571, he had returned to Ayutthaya where he organised a rebellion against the Burmese, sparking the 1584-1593 war, and became King in 1590.

== Date ==
The Luang Prasoet Chronicle (written 1681) states the battle occurred on the second day of the second lunar month of the year 954 (1593) of the Chula Sakarat lunisolar calendar. This places the battle to 25 January 1593. January 25 was later designated as Royal Thai Army Day. Suchart Phueaksakon, a Police Major General who served as the Secretary-General of the Phra Dabos Foundation, submitted a proposal to the Royal Thai Armed Forces Headquarters on 30 December 1997 requesting the date be moved to January 18 for accuracy based on Hindu and Western calculations. The matter was forwarded to the Committee for the Revision of Thai History. Before Suchart, Pin Malakul and Prasert Na Nakhon had also calculated January 18 as the accurate date. Prasert suggested the miscalculations that led to January 25 being chosen as the battle's date stemmed from the assumption that Thaloeng Sok, the start of the Thai New Year, always fell on either April 15 or 16. This alteration has only happened since 1931. In 1593, it would've fell on April 9 - not April 16. In a 2006 government resolution, Royal Thai Army Day was changed to January 18 which has since also been seen as the date the battle occurred on.

== Location ==
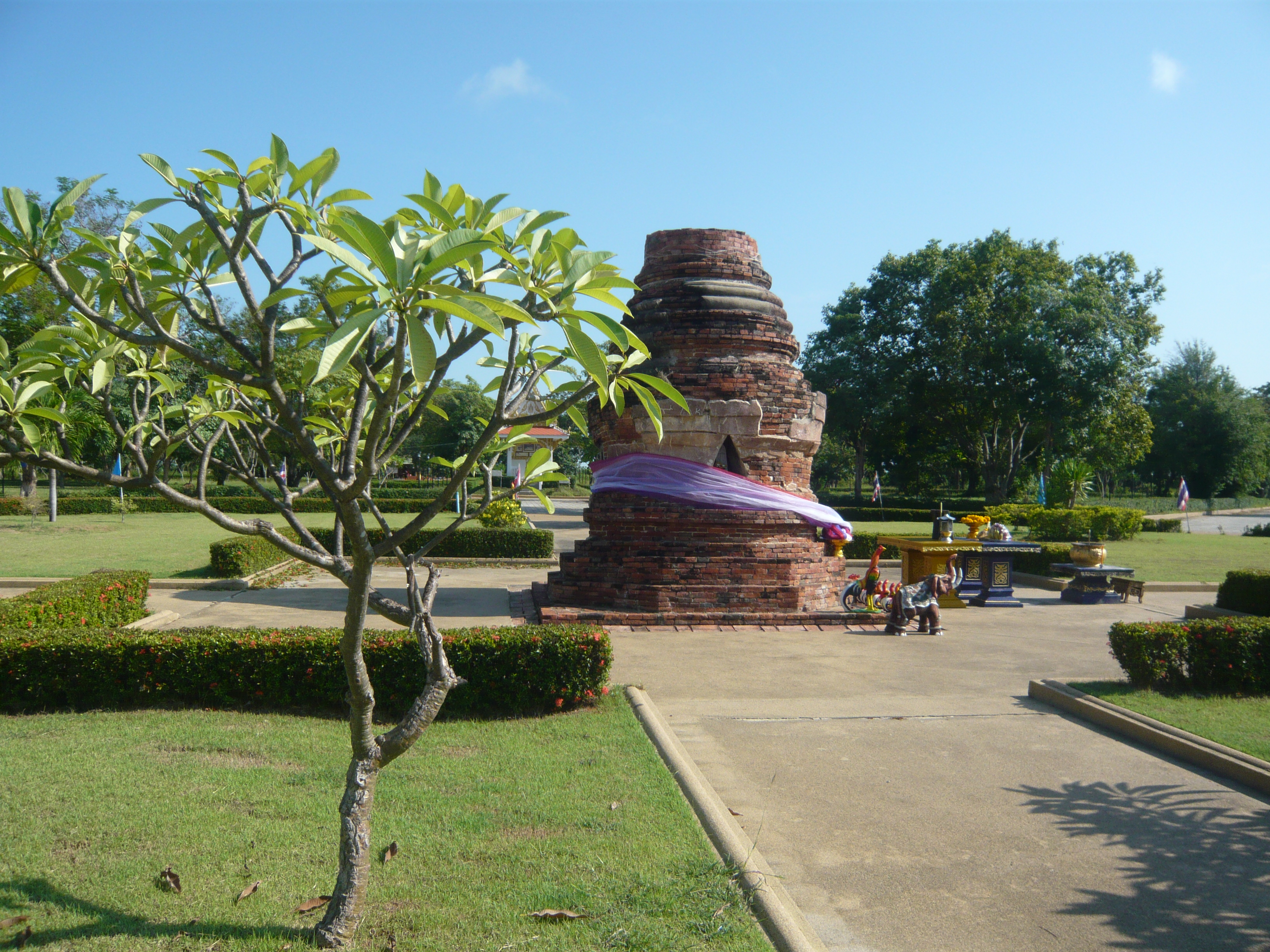
A stupa in Phanom Thuan District, Kanchanaburi Province, which is claimed to be the memorial stupa of the battle between King Naresuan and Mingyi Swa.

It has been proposed that the exact location of where the Battle of Nong Sarai took place was either in modern-day Suphanburi or Kanchanaburi provinces. Siamese documents that may have revealed the battle's location were destroyed in the 1767 sack of Ayutthaya by the Burmese. Prince Damrong Rajanubhap, a Siamese historian and half-brother of King Chulalongkorn, led the first major effort to locate where the battle occurred. Relying on reconstructed Siamese chronicles, he became certain that Naresuan had constructed a stupa at the battle's location, inspired by the large stupa created by King Dutugamunu of Anuradhapura to commemorate his victory against King Ellalan in Sri Lanka. Damrong's search for the stupa was confined to Kanchanaburi and Suphanburi provinces. In 1913, he concluded that the ruins of a stupa in Suphanburi was Naresuan's stupa. In 1935, the Fine Arts Department registered the Suphanburi stupa as the place where the battle had occurred.

In the late 1960s, village headman (kamnan) Chup Buyachoawonsa began claiming that the Governor of Kanchanaburi never actually searched for the stupa in the province and fabricated his report to Damrong as any search would be tiresome. In 1972, a group of publishers, writers and researchers presented evidence that the battle occurred in Kanchanaburi. The Fine Arts Department established a committee that found in 1975 that the battle did happen in Suphanburi and the supposed stupa in Kanchanaburi was built about a century after the Naresuan's reign. The pro-Suphanburi view additionally had the support of Damrong, who was vehemently defended by royalists who viewed any doubts as tantamount to lèse-majesté. For the pro-Kanchanaburi view, they presented evidence that the stupa was actually from the Dvaravati period alongside marching distance calculations that favoured Kanchanaburi. In 1988, the Fine Arts Department stated that there was little evidence the battle occurred at the Suphanburi stupa and the Kanchanaburi stupa was from the Dvaravati period.

Around the 1970s, the emergence of a no-stupa hypothesis argued that Naresuam did not construct a stupa to commemorate the battle. Piset Jiajantrapong was an early proponent of this theory and wrote an article describing it published in Arts & Culture in 1973. Piset argued that there was no knowledge of a stupa before Damrong, the construction of a stand alone stupa as a commemoration would have been unusual, and no Siamese chronicle made reference to a stupa. Following the sack of Ayutthaya, reconstructed documents were significantly inspired by Sri Lankan Buddhist chronicles. In 1982, Srisak Walliphokom argued that Damrong had also wrongly claimed that a stupa in Sukhothai was a monument to an elephant duel won by King Ram Khamhaeng. In 1994, historian Tepmonthri Limpapayom proposed another theory that the battle took place at Wat Pukao Tong near Ayutthaya based off evidence written by German doctor in Siam eighty years after the battle had occurred. Tepmonthri's claim was widely dismissed.

== Accounts of the battle ==
=== Thai accounts ===
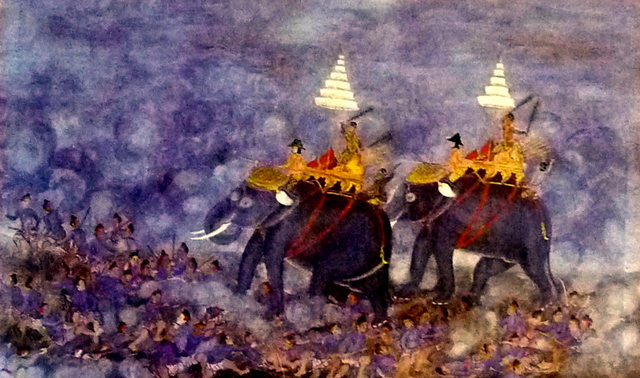
King Naresuan and Prince Ekathotsarot, each rode on their elephants, led the Siamese army to attack the vanguard of Burmese army in the Battle of Nong Sarai. This illustration was painted by Phra Pom according to the royal decree of king Chulalongkorn in 1887.

The mainstream Thai account of the Battle of Nong Sarai from the Siamese Royal Chronicles is that the Burmese king Nanda Bayin sent his son Swa to suppress the rebellion in Siam. The two armies, each consisting of hundred of thousands of men met each other. Swa then accepted an offer from Naresuan to an elephant duel. Naresuan's elephant, a rut, rushed towards Swa who fought with a scythe. Naresuan avoided injury and slashed a deep cut across Swa's chest, killing him, whilst Naresuan's elephant driver was killed from a bullet. At the same time, Naresuan's brother and future king Ekathotsarot defeated the Burmese general Mangchacharo in another elephant duel. The Burmese army were then pursued by the Siamese until they had completely retreated from Siam in a massive slaughter. After the battle, Naresuan accused 15 of his senior officers of abandoning him by letting him duel Swa alone. Historian Barend Jan Terwiel, writing in 2013, highlighted several issues and contradictions in the mainstream account. In mainland Southeast Asia, elephant duels were invoked by two opposing parties when the outcome between two armies of comparable strength was likely to produce heavy losses for both sides. The outcome of the duel was understood to then settle the outcome of the battle. However, the chronicles state that two duels were happening simultaneously and that bloodshed between the two armies still occurred.

In 1640, Jeremias van Vliet, a Dutch resident of Ayutthaya, reproduced a different version of the battle based off written and oral information he received from his time in Siam. It is the oldest Siamese account. In it, Naresuan's smaller elephant was frightened and tried to flee Swa's much larger one. Naresuan prayed and begged the elephant to be brave and sprinkled him with sacred water. The elephant then charged at Swa and took him by surprise, allowing Naresuan to strike Swa's head with a goad and stab him with a lance to kill him. The Portuguese sat behind Swa was also killed by one of Naresuan's bodyguards. In the aftermath, the retreating Burmese army was pursued, leading to many being slain and taken as prisoners of war. The second oldest Siamese account is from the Luang Prasoet Chronicle written in 1681 by the Chief Royal Astrologer, the Phra Horathibodi, provides a similar account. It describes Naresuan as riding on his chief elephant, Phraya Chayanuphap, to battle Swa who he ultimately killed, although Naresuan's right arm was wounded. His elephant was then renamed Chao Phraya Prap Hongsa (His Honourable, Conqueror of Burma). Both versions do not include Naresuan challenging Swa to a formal duel, nor is Ekathotsarot mentioned.

The fourth Siamese account of the battle was described in the Yodaya Yazawin, written in Burmese most likely by Siamese nobles taken to Burma following the Fall of Ayutthaya in 1767. A copy from 1845 describes the battle from the first skirmishes where neither side emerged victorious. As such, both sides agreed to an elephant duel between Naresuan and Swa. Both sat on male elephants in musth, although Swa's was stronger. Naresuan managed to avoid the strokes of Swa's long-handled sword until Swa's elephant was gored at the base of its tusk and fell. He was then slain by Naresuan whilst still on his elephant. No further fighting happened as Swa's soldiers were allowed to return to Hanthawaddy in accordance with the normal rules of elephant duels. The Statement of Khun Luang Ha Wat of the Ayutthaya Testimonies most likely written by Mon scholars through interviews with Siamese captives in Burma also taken after 1767 states that Naresuan challenged Swa to fight using traditional methods instead of using European firearms.

=== Burmese accounts ===
In the Hmannan Yazawin Dawgyi written in the early 1800s based on the work written by U Kala a century before, the Burmese arrived in the vicinity of Ayutthaya in February 1593 and engaged in battle with the Siamese led by Naresuan. A Burmese general riding an elephant in musth had its eyes bandaged to prevent it from erratically attacking other male elephants. The general, upon seeing Naresuan and his elephant near Swa, had his elephant unbandaged so it could attack Naresuan. Instead, it inflicted a severe wound into Swa' elephant that allowed Naresuan to fire a gun and kill him. He, however, believed the attack failed as the man behind Swa managed to hold him up right so he appeared alive, causing Naresuan to not fully exploit his advantage. The Siamese were driven back to Ayutthaya, but the Burmese generals decided to return to Burma - arriving in March 1593. Importantly, the Burmese chronicle states no formal duel ever happened

=== Foreign and modern accounts ===
Several different contemporary accounts were made by Europeans and Persians on the battle, which collaborate and contradict several aspects of Thai and Burmese accounts. Multiple accounts by foreigners also provide evidence that an elephant duel did occur, whilst others do not mention any duel.

Antonio Bocarro, the Portuguese Chronicler and Keeper of the Archives in Goa, described the battle in his early 17th century book Decada 13 da Historia da India. He describes how Naresuan suggested to Swa that the two hold an elephant duel to prevent a slaughter quarter of a mile from Ayutthaya. Without consulting his commanders and advisors, Swa accepted Naresuan's offer. In doing so, he missed out of a certain Burmese victory. Swa rode alone on the elephant his father used in his conquests. The Siamese had brought four elaborately decorated elephants, with their entire army consisting of 500 soldiers on elephants, 10,000 on horses, and 50,000 foot soldiers. Despite his odds, Swa succeeded in killing one commander and despatching another before facing Naresuan, who he injured with an axe. Naresuan then called on two Portuguese mercenaries to fire their guns (espingardas) at Swa. Mortally wounded in his howdah, Naresuan killed him before attacking the leaderless Burmeses and forcing them 3.2 kilometres (2.0 mi) from Ayutthaya. Another Portuguese source, published anonymously, also states that Swa was convinced to an elephant duel that would decide the battle's outcome and later lead to his death. However, that source contends that Naresuan's brother Ekathotsarot was Swa's sole opponent.

Samuel Purchas, an English author, stated in Pilgrimage (1613) that in the final invasion of Siam by the Burmese in the 1584-1593 war, the son of the Burmese king was killed from a shot. According to American historian Victor Lieberman, Purchas' source of information would've been from a 1602 letter by Nicholas Pimenta (a Jesuit active in the region) that attributed Swa's death to a lead bullet. An account made by a Persian diplomat who visited Siam in 1685 states that Naresuan hid a firearm under his elephant goad and used it to kill Swa during the duel.

Jan Terwiel, writing for the Siam Society in 2013, proposed a new narrative that synthesised elements from Siamese, Burmese and foreign accounts whilst denying that a formal duel took place. He describes that the Burmese army led by Swa arrived west of Ayutthaya in February 1593 and was confronted by Siamese led by Naresuan with Ekathotsarot and at least 15 other commanders. Naresuan, having limited control of his elephant, wandered too close to Swa's. Only Ekathotsarot came to his assistance and engaged a Burmese general on elephant. Another Burmese general, seeing Swa in danger, uncovered the bandaged eyes of his elephant in musth to support him, but ended up severely wounding Swa's elephant. Naresuan took advantage of his opponent's position and he (or another rider on his elephant) used a gun to kill Swa. Realising that he was in a dangerous exposed position where the other commanders had not came forward with their troops, Naresuan and Ekathotsarot pulled back. After the battle, Naresuan had his commanders punished whilst the Burmese retreated back to Burma, ending their campaign in Siam.

== Aftermath ==
Following his victory at Nong Sarai, Naresuan sent his armies to seize control of Tavoy and Tenasserim from the Burmese.

According to an account made in the memoirs of Jacques de Coutre, a Flemish trader who visited Ayutthaya in 1695, an elaborate funeral was held in Ayutthaya that year for the elephant Naresuan used at Nong Sarai. Naresuan was described as heartbroken and had the elephant embalmed and worshipped for eight days before being cremated. Its ashes were then collected and stored in golden urns placed with the urns of Naresuan's ancestors. de Coutre then wrote that two carers of the elephant came to Naresuan and asked to serve it in the afterlife, after which they were slain and cremated. That particular elephant may have been the only animal ever awarded with the rank Chao Phraya.

== Legacy ==
=== Thai nationalism and culture ===
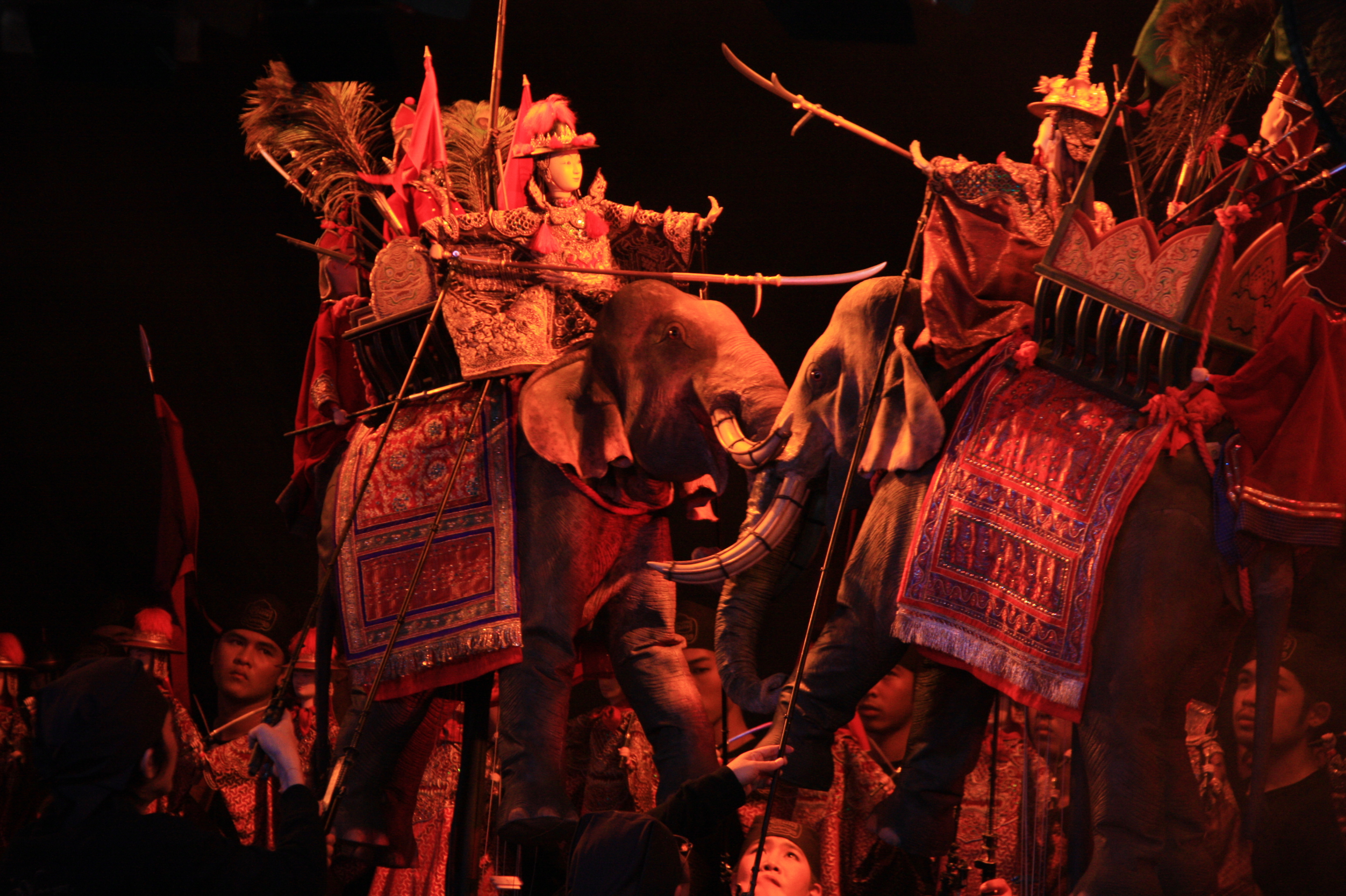
Puppet show production of Lilit Talaeng Phai showing the elephant duel between Swa and Naresuan.

18 January is celebrated annually as Royal Thai Army Day or Yutthahatthi Day. From 1959 to 1970, Royal Thai Army Day was celebrated on April 8, and then on January 25 from 1980 to 2006. In 2006, the date was changed to January 18. Ceremonies, including religious rituals, are held on Royal Thai Army Day at the monuments commemorating the battle at Suphanburi and in front of the Royal Thai Armed Forces Headquarters.

Many Siamese chronicles and texts written after the Fall of Ayutthaya in 1767 glorify Naresuan's victory to a greater extent than texts written before the fall. This was in part also to legitimise the position of contemporary kings of the early Bangkok period. In Phraratchaphongsawadan Krung Sayam (1795), Swa was compared to Mara - a demon who tried to tempt the Buddha - whilst Naresuan was compared to the Buddha who successively attained nirvana after defeating Mara. Swa's comparison to Mara was also present in Paramanuchitchinorot's 1832 poem Lilit Talaeng Phai (Defeat of the Mons), where Naresuan was depicted as Indra.

The elephant duel at Nong Sarai is one of the most reproduced scenes from Thai history owing to its recognisability and significance. Under King Chulalongkorn, a series of paintings and poems inspired from 92 scenes he had selected from the Royal Chronicles were made and finished by 1887. The painting of the Nong Sarai duel in the series was created by Luang Phisanukam. It is also depicted in the series of murals on Naresuan's life at Wat Suwan Dararam in Ayutthaya, with the duel being the largest and most prominent of the temple's murals. The murals were painted and completed in 1931 under King Prajadhipok. Below are several paintings and murals depicting the battle. Several paintings and murals of the battle are shown below:

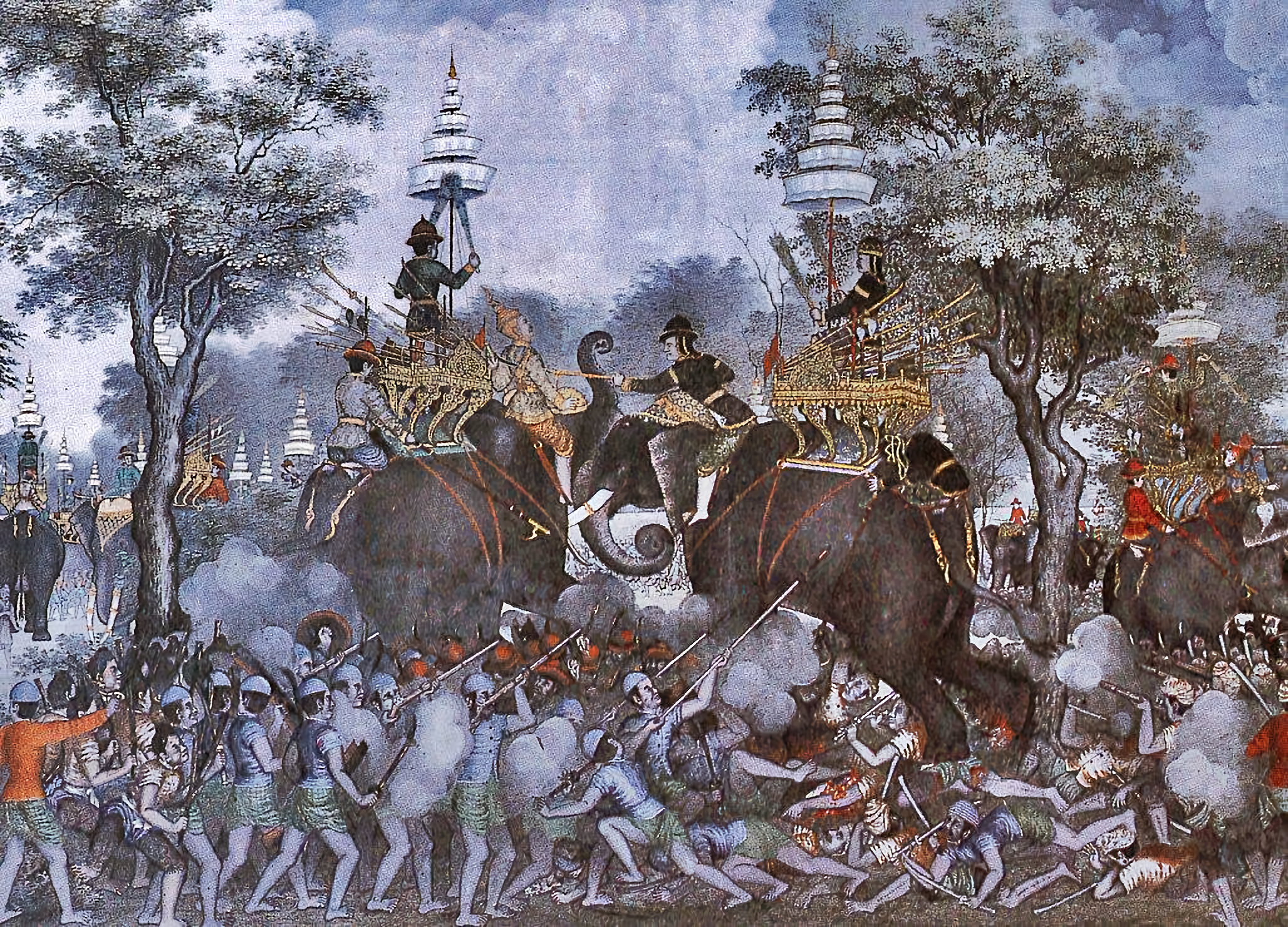
From 1887, commissioned by Chulalongkorn

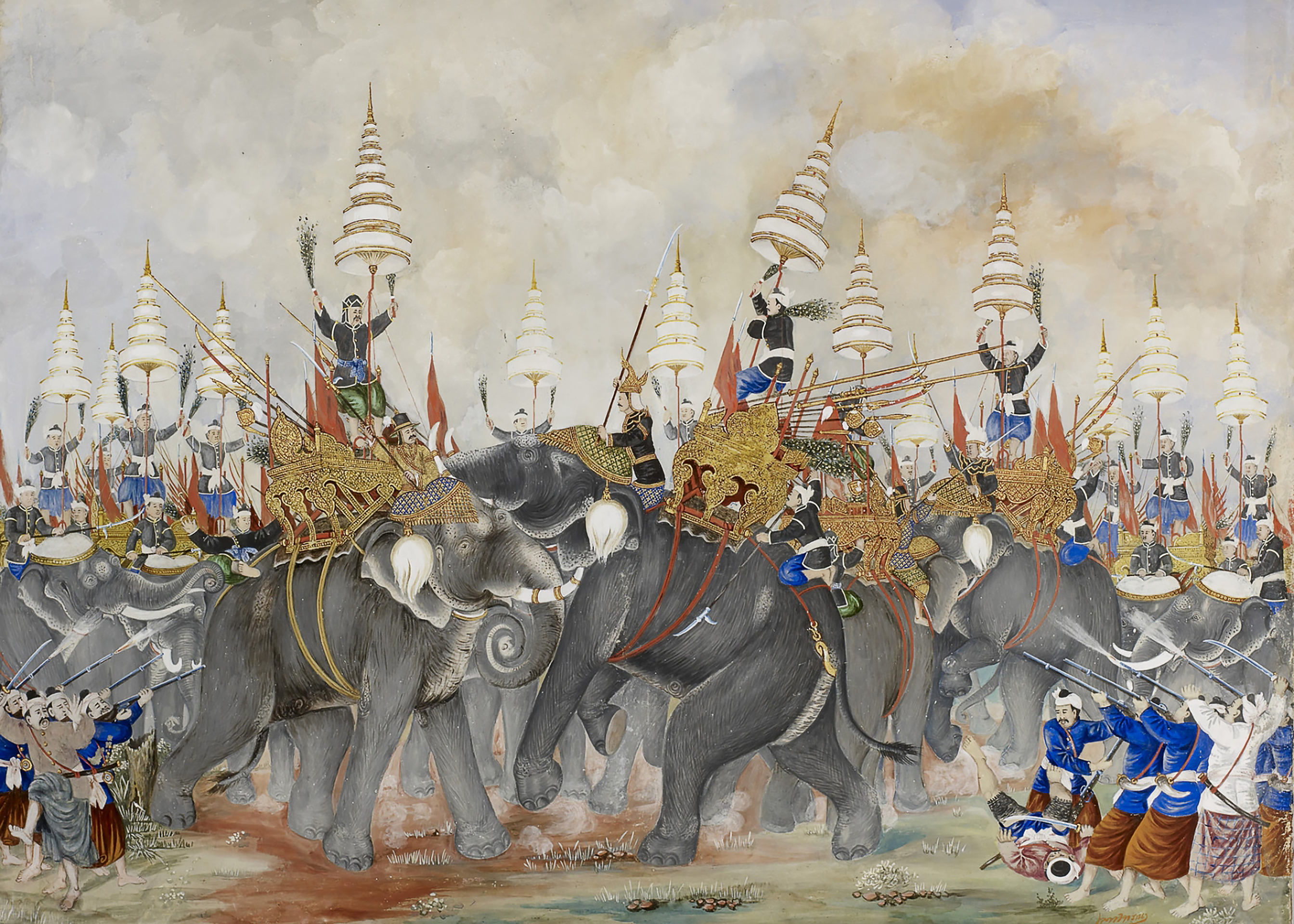
From late 19th century

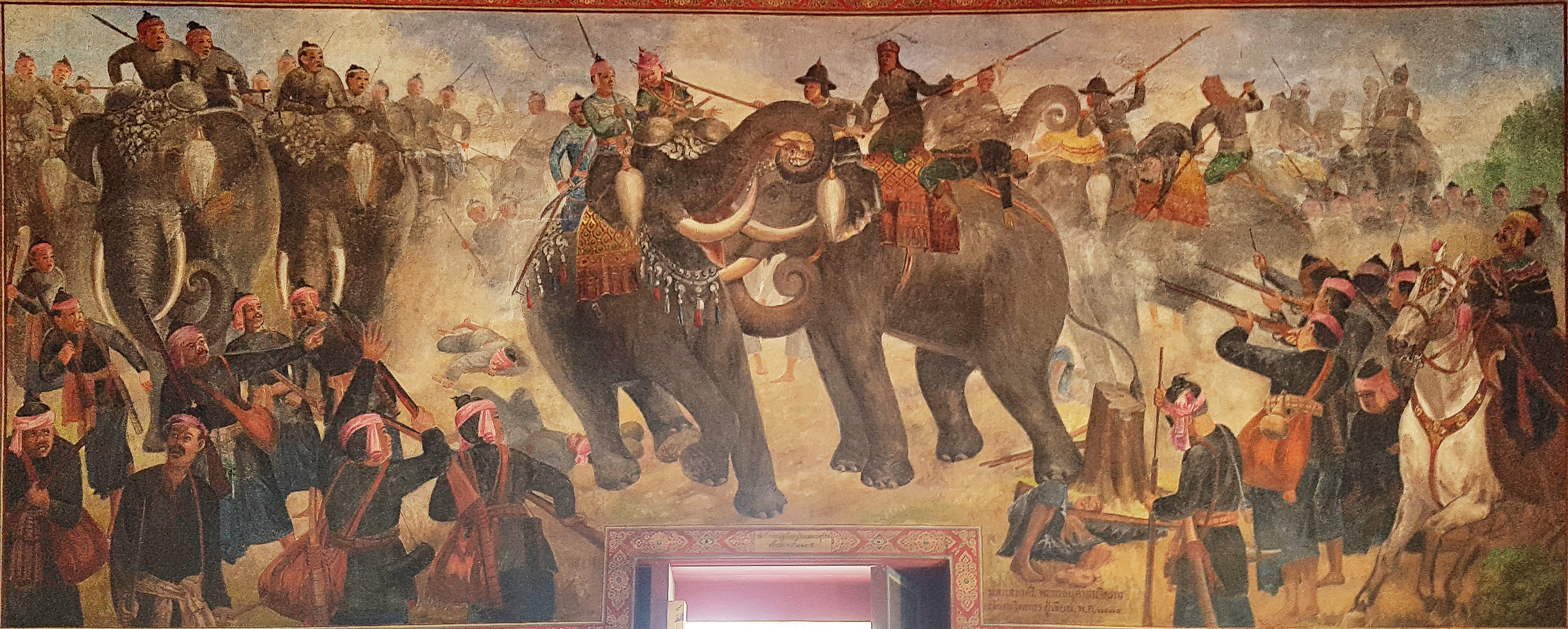
From 1931, mural

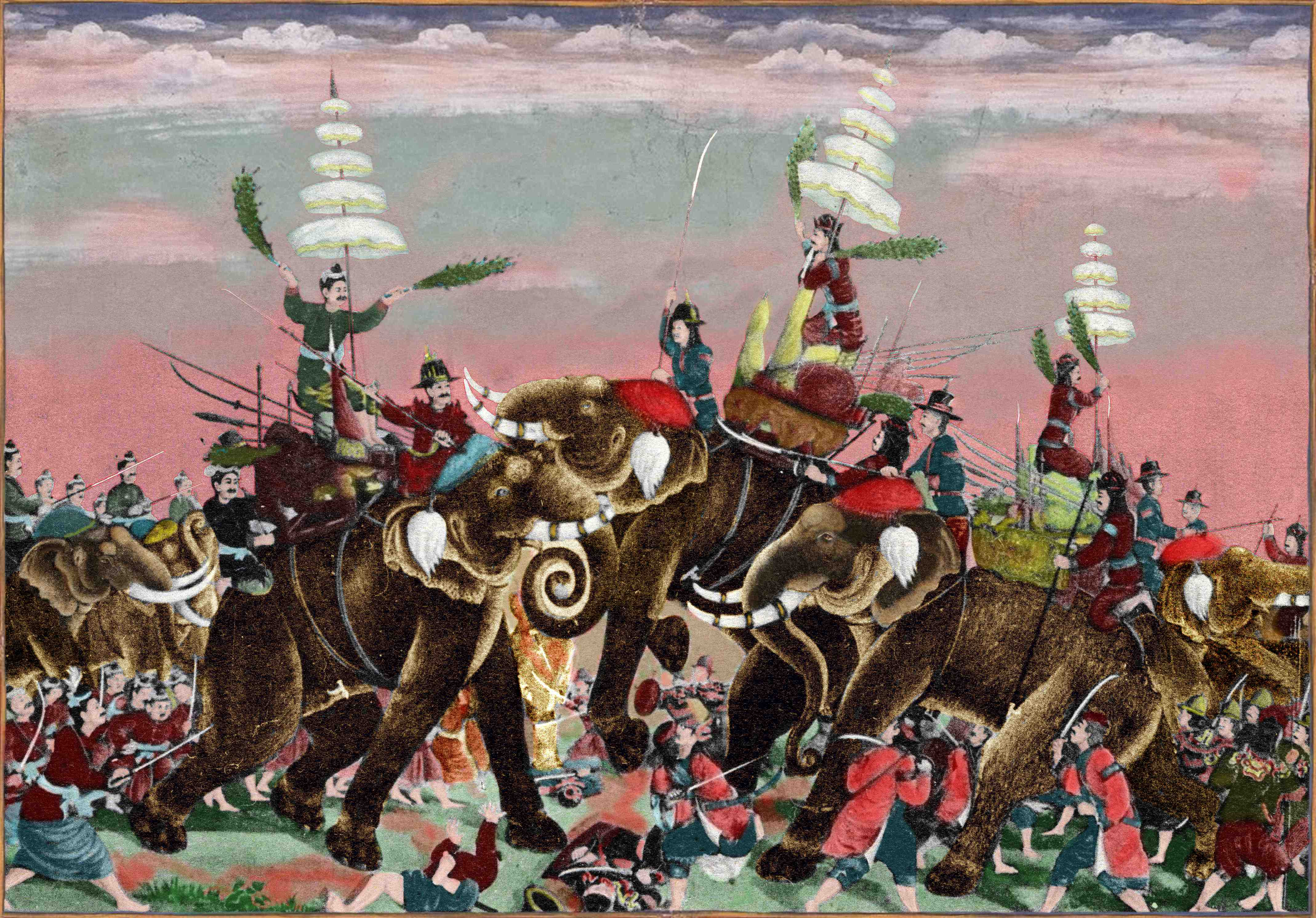
From 1800s to 1900s

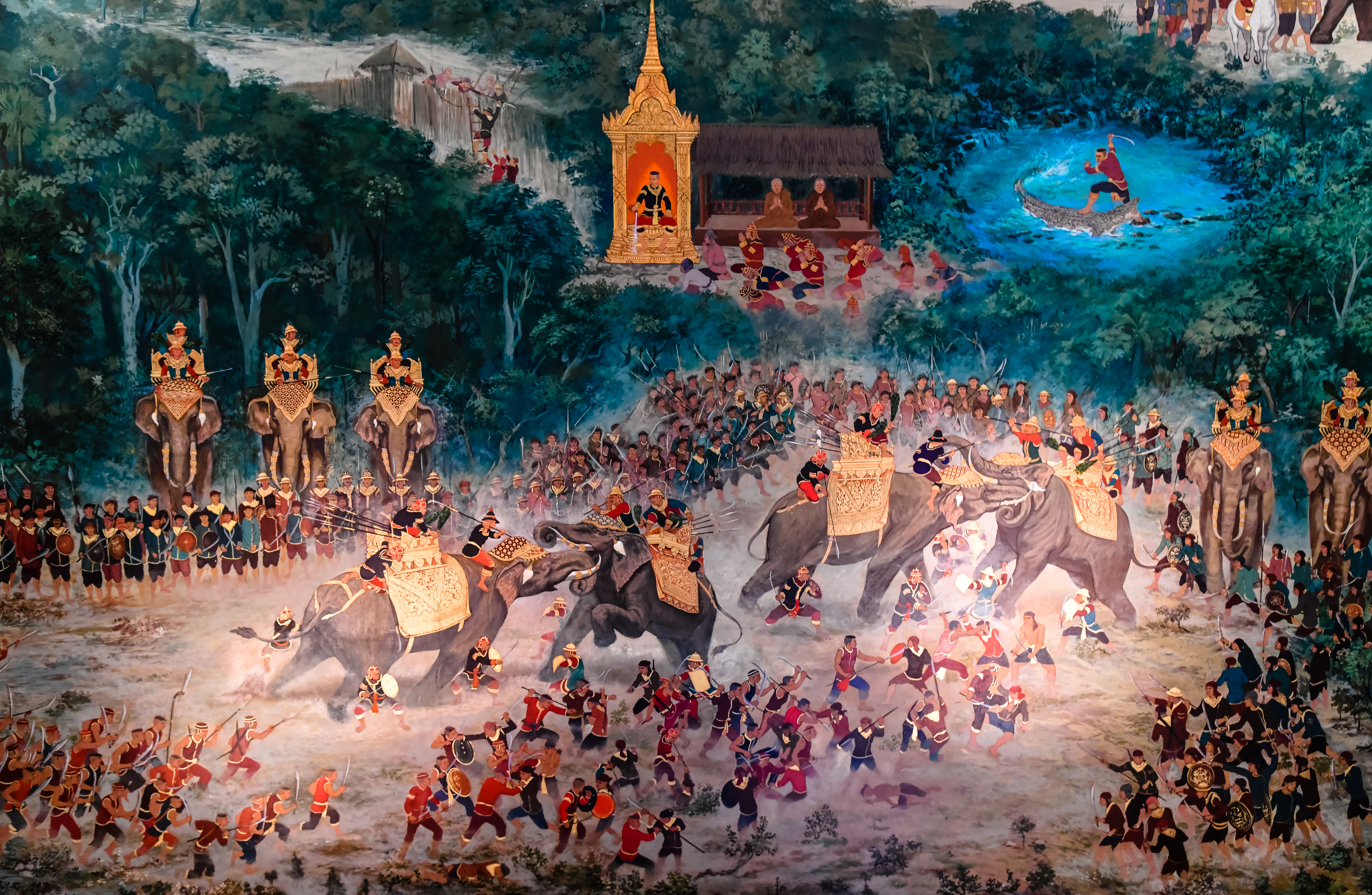
From the History of Thailand

The battle has been featured in several films. This includes:

- Kan Kluay (2006)
- King Naresuan Part V: Elephant Battle (2014)

Questioning of the authenticity of traditional Thai accounts have led to people facing lèse-majesté charges. At a university seminar in 2014, Sulak Sivaraksa questioned the authenticity of the elephant duel and was subsequently charged by police for lèse-majesté. The charges were revived in 2017.

=== Monuments ===
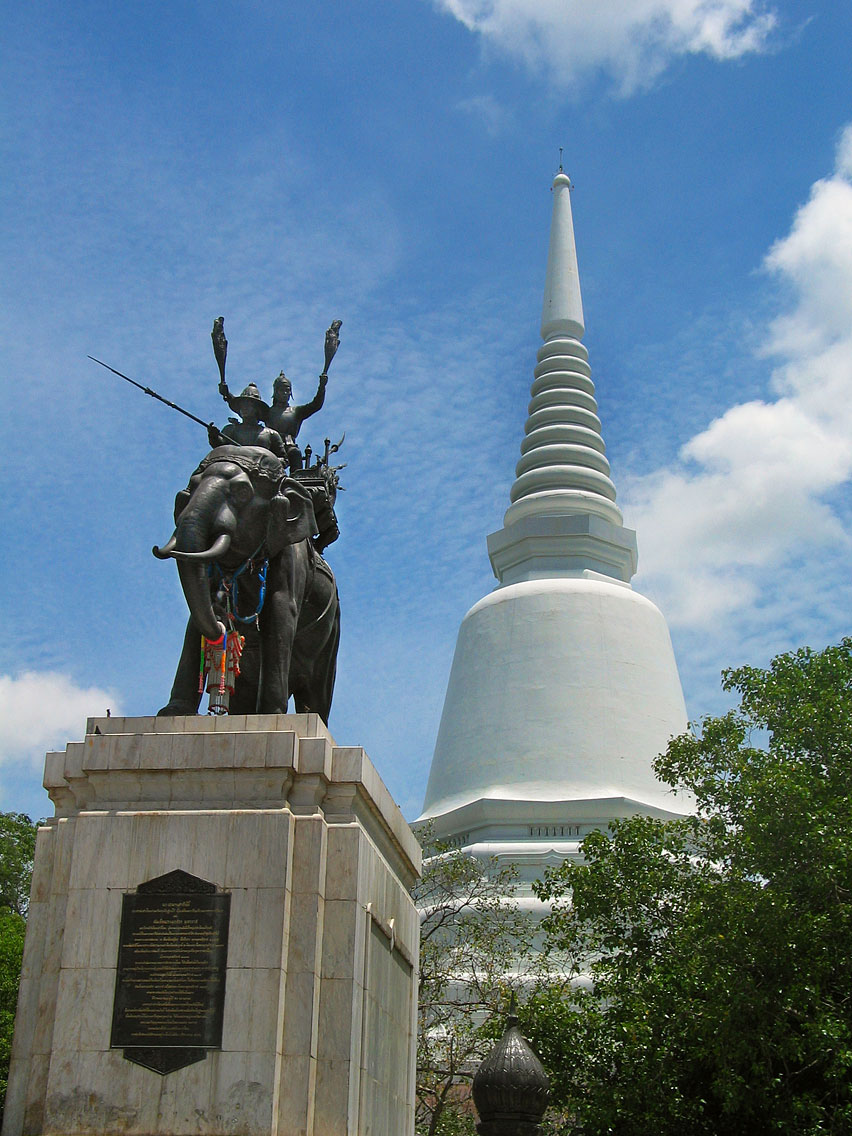
Don Chedi Monument

In 1914, Damrong accompanied King Vajiravudh to the ruins of a stupa Damrong had identified as the stupa Naresuan built to commemorate the battle. A royal ceremony was then performed to consecrate the stupa. Damrong conceived the idea of constructing a monument at this site to honour the battle. A monument and large community complex commemorating the battle was later constructed by the government of Prime Minister Plaek Phibunsongkram and opened on 25 January 1959 in Suphanburi province. Revised plans for a monument were developed in 1950 and the project was approved in 1952. The monument depicts Naresuan and Mingyi Swa mounted on elephants during their duel. The surrounding complex included a Buddhist stupa that claimed to have been built on the original stupa Naresuan built to commemorate the battle, a wat, a primary and secondary school, as well as roads connecting the isolated area to nearby cities. The opening ceremony was led by King Bhumibol Adulyadej. In 1978, the Bank of Thailand released in its 12th series a ฿100 bill with the Don Chedi monument to the duel on the reverse.

Following the construction of the Suphanburi monument, the authenticity of the site was questioned as some believed the actual battle and original stupa were located in Phanom Thuan district, Kanchanaburi province, about 85 kilometres (53 mi) southwest. A second monument was subsequently began construction in Kanchanaburi province in 1999. The monument marked the 400th anniversary of Naresuan passing through the Three Pagoda Pass to invade Burma via Kanchanaburi and did not openly confront the Suphanburi monument's claim. It was opened in February 2003 by Crown Prince Vajiralongkorn. However, the monument and museum do subtly claim to the be the site of the Battle of Nong Sarai.
