= Naresuan =

King of Siam from 1590 to 1605

Naresuan the Great นเรศวรมหาราช
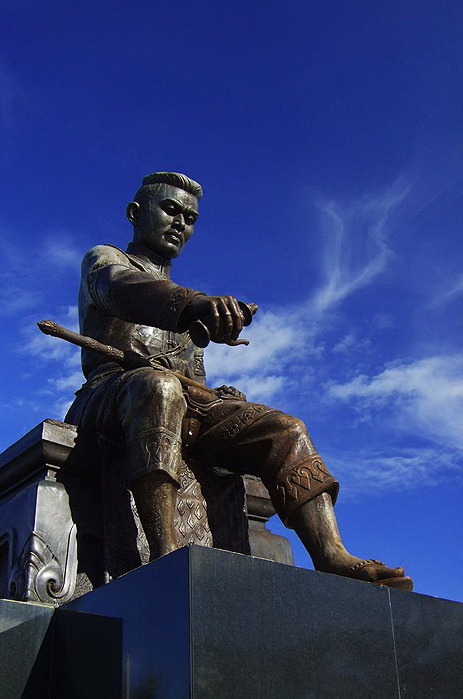
- Statue of King Naresuan pouring water on the ground, symbolizing declaration of independence from the Burmese Taungoo Empire, at Naresuan University

King of Ayutthaya
- Reign: 1 July 1590 – 25 April 1605
- Predecessor: Maha Thammaracha
- Successor: Ekathotsarot

Viceroy of Ayutthaya King of Phitsanulok
- Tenure: 1571 – 1 July 1590
- Appointer: Maha Thammaracha
- Predecessor: Maha Thammaracha
- Successor: Ekathotsarot
- Suzerain: Bayinnaung (1571–1581); Nanda Bayin (1581–1584); Maha Thammaracha V (1584–1590)
- Born: Naret; 1555/1556, 917 CS; Chan Palace, Phitsanulok, Sukhothai Kingdom
- Died: 25 April 1605 (aged 48–50); Monday, 8th waxing of Sixth Siamese month (Vaisakha), 967 CS; Lan Na
- Spouse: Mani Rattana; Ek Kasattri; Yodaya Mibaya
- Issue: Prince Maha Thammaracha (likely)
Regnal name
- Somdej Boromabatbongkot Laksana Akaburisodboromnhonra Chaofah Naret Chetthathibodi
- Dynasty: Sukhothai
- Father: Maha Thammaracha
- Mother: Wisut Kasattri
- Religion: Theravada Buddhism

Naresuan (1555/1556 – 25 April 1605), commonly known as Naresuan the Great, (Note: Thai: สมเด็จพระนเรศวรมหาราช, RTGS: Somdet Phra Naresuan Maharat, pronounced [sǒm.dèt pʰráʔ ná(ʔ).rēː.sǔan mā.hǎː.râːt],, Burmese: မဟာ နရဲစွမ်) or Sanphet II (Note: Thai: สรรเพชญ์ที่ ๒, pronounced [sǎn.pʰét thîː sɔ̌ːŋ], Burmese: ဆမ်ဖတ် ၂)) was King of Ayutthaya from the Sukhothai dynasty from 1590 and overlord of Lan Na from 1602 until his death in 1605. Naresuan is one of Thailand's most revered monarchs as he is known for his campaigns to free Ayutthaya from the vassalage of the First Toungoo Empire. During his reign, numerous wars were fought against Taungoo Burma. Naresuan also welcomed the Dutch.

== Early life ==
Prince Naret (Thai: พระนเรศ) was born in Phitsanulok in 1555–56. (Note: Naresuan was likely born sometime between 18 July 1555 and 27 April 1556. (Damrong 2001: 116): He became king on the 13th waning of the eighth Siamese month of 952 CS at age 34 (in 35th year), meaning he was born between 14th waning of Ashadha 917 CS (18 July 1555) and 13th waning of Ashadha 918 CS (5 July 1556). (Damrong 2001: 177) says that he died in his 50th year on Monday, 8th waxing of the sixth Siamese month (Vaisakha) of 967 CS (25 April 1605), meaning he was born sometime between 9th waxing of Vaisakha 917 CS (29 April 1555) and 8th waxing of Vaisakha 918 CS (17 April 1556). Furthermore, (Damrong 2001: 67) also says that Naresuan was already 8 (in his 9th year) when he was taken to Pegu after Bayinnaung took Phitsanulok—per (Damrong 2001: 36) on Sunday, 5th waning of the second Siamese month in the year of the pig: i.e. Sunday, 5th waning of Pausha 925 CS (Sunday, 2 January 1564). Although (Damrong 2001) does not exactly state when the prince was sent to Pegu, he may have been sent there shortly after 2 January 1564 or shortly after Bayinnaung took Ayutthaya on 18 February 1564 per (Hmannan Vol. 2 2003: 355). If so, he may have been born sometime between July 1555 and Jan/February 1556.) He was the son of King Mahathammarachathirat of Phitsanulok and his queen consort, Wisutkasat. His mother was a daughter of Maha Chakkraphat and queen consort Suriyothai. His father was a Sukhothai noble who had defeated Worawongsathirat in 1548 and put Maha Chakkraphat on the throne. Prince Naret, also known as the "Black Prince" (Thai: พระองค์ดำ), had a younger brother Ekathotsarot, known as the "White Prince", and an elder sister, Suphankanlaya.

During the siege of Ayutthaya during the Burmese–Siamese War (1563–64), King Bayinnaung of the Toungoo dynasty of Bago, Burma (formerly known in Burmese as Hanthawaddy (ဟံသာဝတီ) and in Thai as Hongsawadi (หงสาวดี)) led a massive army, invading the country and laying siege to Phitsanulok. Maha Thammarachathirat came to believe that the city would not be able to withstand a long siege due to a scarcity of food and a smallpox outbreak, so he surrendered the city. King Bayinnaung took Phitsanulok and Ayutthaya, and made Thailand a Burmese tributary state. He required Maha Thammarachathirat to send his son—the Black Prince—to Bago as a royal hostage to ensure the king's fidelity.

== At Bago ==
The War of the first fall was ended by Bayinnaung, who installed Maha Thammaracha as a vassal king of Ayutthaya. After six years in Pegu, c. 1570, Prince Naret and his brother the White Prince returned to Ayutthaya. While in Burma, "he followed the best of Burmese military training," studying alongside the "elite of Burmese youth, sons of princes and nobles." "Besides being gifted in military prowess, Naresuan who was highly intelligent, gained a great deal of general knowledge of the times."

== Ayutthaya reduced to a Vassal Empire ==
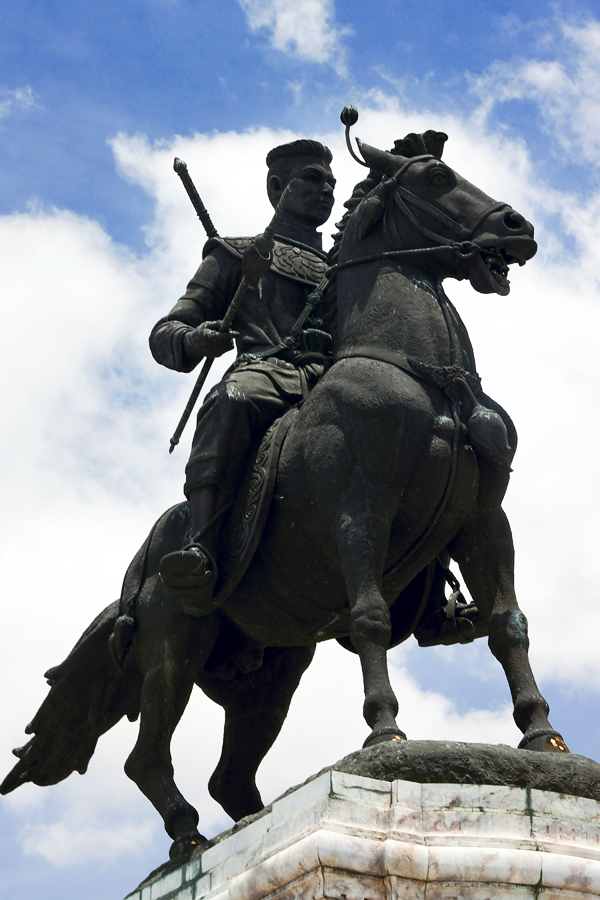
Royal statue of King Naresuan in Phra Nakhon Si Ayutthaya

Following the 1569 conquest by King Bayinnaung, Ayutthaya was reduced to a vassal of the First Toungoo Empire. Under the reign of Maha Thammaracha, the kingdom endured the pillaging of its capital, mass deportations, and frequent raids from Cambodia.

In 1570, at the age of 15, Naret was appointed by his father as the Phra Maha Uparaja ("viceroy" or "crown prince") of Ayutthaya, and sent to rule Phitsanulok, taking the name Naresuan. (Note: According to Damrong (2001, p. 75), Naresuan was 8 years old when he was taken to Pegu in 1564 and returned to become viceroy six years later at the age of 15.) or Narayana

During his time as viceroy, Naresuan participated in a military expedition alongside his father and the King of Bago to conquer Vientiane, the capital of the restored Lan Xang. However, the campaign was cut short for him when he contracted smallpox, forcing his return to the capital. During his visits to Ayutthaya to see his parents, he resided at the Chankasem Palace, which he had commissioned as a royal residence.

=== Cambodian attacks on Ayutthaya ===
In 1570, after seeing the fall of Ayutthaya to the Burmese, Baraminreachea, the Khmer King, took the opportunity to retake the lands lost to the Siamese. He amassed an army of 20,000 men and seized Nakhon Nayok. He continued to march to Ayutthaya and set up camp at Ban Krathum sub-district. After setting up camp, he also planned to attack the city. The Cambodian navy of 50 ships soon arrived at Bangkok and besieged it. King Maha Thammarachathirat issued a command to defend Ayutthaya. The Cambodian besieged Ayutthaya for 3 days, but the city stood strong. The Cambodian army was forced to retreat back to Cambodia and took a large number of prisoners with them.

In 1574, when the Ayutthayan Army under the command of King Maha Thammarachathirat and King Naresuan was assisting Bayinnaung in his campaign to attack Lanxang, Baraminreachea took the opportunity to attack Ayutthaya again. Luckily, King Naresuan contracted smallpox and was forced to return to Ayutthaya to recover. When he got back to Ayutthaya, the Cambodian Navy was present and besieging Nai Kai fortress. The fortress fell to the Cambodian forces. King Naresuan lured the Cambodian navy up the river where they met the Siamese artillery. After heavy bombardment, the Cambodian navy was forced to retreat.

In 1578, Phraya Chin Chantu, a Chinese noble serving under Cambodia attacked the city of Phetchaburi. The attack failed and Phraya Chin Chantu was too afraid to go back to Cambodia. He was allowed to take refuge in Ayutthaya by Maha Thammaracha. Shortly thereafter, he boarded a junk and fled. At that time, King Naresuan was 24 years old and was aware that Phraya Chin Chantu was a Cambodian agent who took refuge in Ayutthaya under false pretenses to gather information on the Siamese court. He ordered Siamese boats to chase Phraya Chin Chantu's junk. Since Chinese junks are much bigger than Siamese junks and were more suited for sailing out to sea, Phraya Chin Chantu was able to escape.

In 1580, Baraminreachea still believed Siam was weak and ordered Thotsa Racha and Surin Racha to invade Siam with a force of 5,000, including elephants and cavalry. The plan was to raid cities around Ayutthaya such as Saraburi and capture loot and people. Naresuan led a force of 3,000 men out of Ayutthaya to engage the Khmer army. The Khmer army was destroyed and forced to retreat back to Cambodia. This battle made King Naresuan revered among the Siamese and Burmese courts. As a result of this, the Khmers did not dare to attack Thailand again.

=== Wars with the Taungoo Dynasty ===
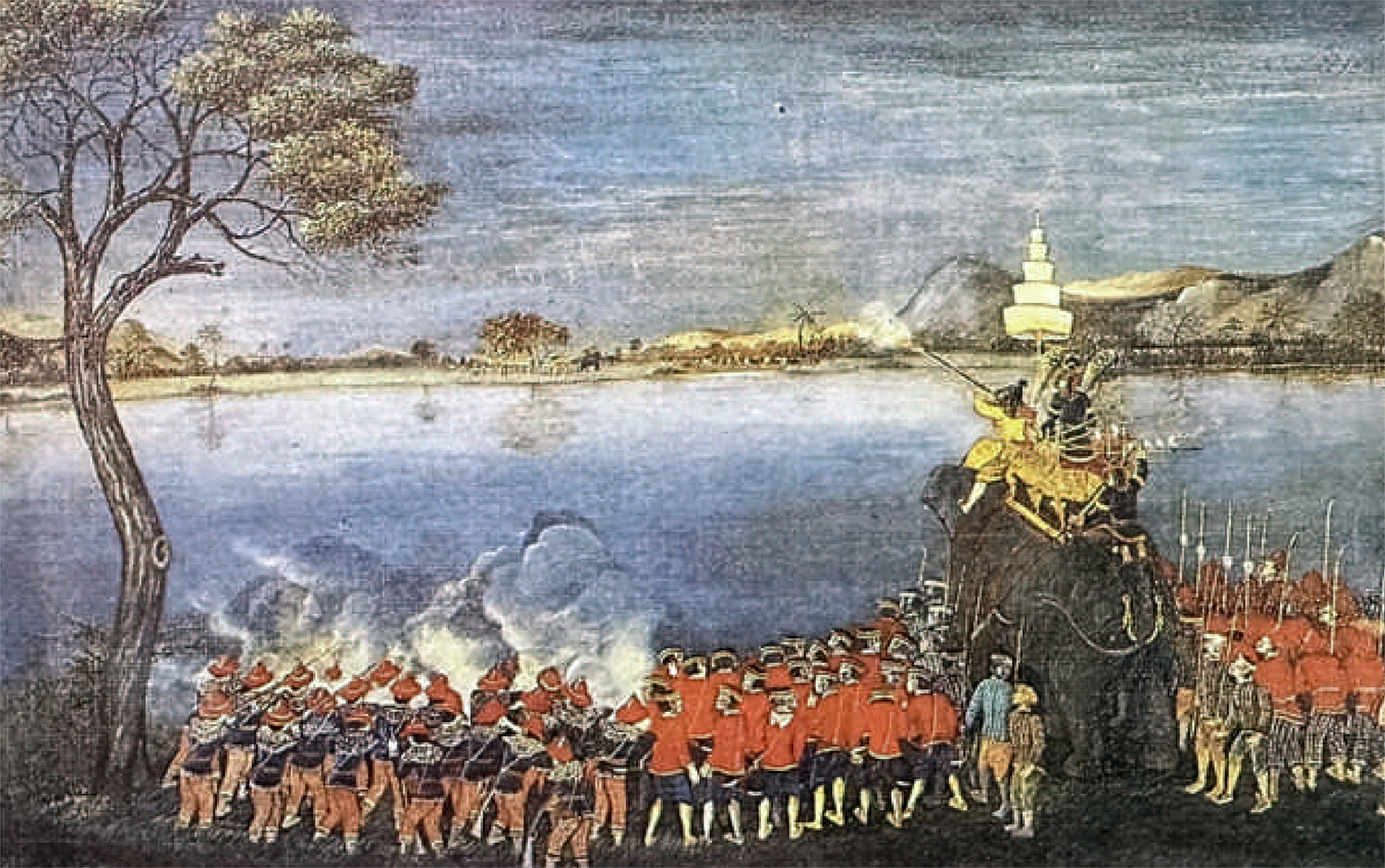
King Naresuan shot his gun across the Sittoung River, killing Surakamma, chief of the Burmese army

In 1581, Bayinnaung died, and was succeeded by his son Nanda Bayin. Nanda's uncle Viceroy Thado Minsaw of Ava then rebelled in 1583, forcing Nanda Bayin to call upon the viceroys of Prome, Taungoo, Chiang Mai, Vientiane, and Ayutthaya for assistance in suppressing the rebellion. On 2 February 1584, Naresuan left with his troops to Bago as ordered, and arrived at the border only in April. (Note: (Damrong 2001: 85): Naresuan began his march on the 6th waning moon of the third Siamese month, year of the horse, BE 2126, and arrived at Muang Khraeng, the border in the sixth month. Editors of (Damrong 2001) translated the dates as March 1583 and June 1583 respectively. But the given dates are lunisolar calendar dates, and should follow then prevailing Chula Sakarat calendar. The Thai calendar (and the month names) did not get realigned to the Gregorian calendar until 1941. According to (Eade 1989: 133), 6th waning of the 3rd Siamese month (Magha, assuming Sukhothia style month naming adopted at Ayutthaya), 945 CS translates to 2 February [O.S. 23 January] 1584, and the sixth month translates to 10 April 1584 to 9 May 1584 (N.S.) According to the Burmese Hmannan Yazawin chronicle (Hmannan Vol. 3 2003: 77–79), Naresuan's troops arrived near the environs of Pegu prior to Nanda having defeated the Ava rebellion on Tuesday, 1st waning of Kason 946 ME (Tuesday, 24 April [O.S. 14 April] 1584).) According to Damrong, this raised Nanda's suspicions, who ordered his son, the Maha Uparaja Mingyi Swa, to remain in the capital and kill Naresuan. The Burmese chronicles say that Nanda made the decision to have Mingyi Swa guard Pegu prior to his march to Ava on 25 March 1584. (Note: (Hmannan Vol. 3 2003: 76): Nanda appointed Swa to guard Pegu, and marched to Ava on full moon of Late Tagu 945 ME (25 March [O.S. 15 March] 1584), and Swa asked Naresuan to continue on to Ava when Naresuan's troops arrived near Pegu.)

According to Damrong, Naresuan reached Kraeng the border town, where he learned that Phraya Ram and Phraya Kiet had been sent by the Maha Uparat to attack Naresuan from the rear while Maha Uparat attacked from the front. Naresuan called a council, which included priests, Phraya Kiat, Phraya Ram, and other Mons. Naresuan then "poured water on the earth from a gold goblet to proclaim to the devatas in the presence of the persons assembled, that from that day forth Siam had severed friendship with Hongsawadi and was no longer in amity as of yore."

According to Damrong, Naresuan then levied the Mons to join his campaign and marched onto Bago, intending to free the Siamese families held captive there. However, Nanda Bayin had already defeated the viceroy of Inwa and was returning to his capital. Naresuan then retreated after freeing about 10,000 families. Mingyi Swa pursued with Surakamma in the advance element. The Burmese caught up with the Siamese at the Satong River. There Surakamma was killed by "the royal gun used by Somdet Phra Naresuan while crossing the Satong river". This sent the Maha Uparat's troops into a panicked retreat, prompting him to return to the capital.

Naresuan then held the "ceremony of swearing allegiance" with the people of Sukhothai, drinking water from the sacred pond of Puay Si. His forces then took Sawankhalok. In 1584 Naresuan brought down all of the men from the northern provinces to the Siamese capital of Ayutthaya in preparation for the attack of the Bago army.

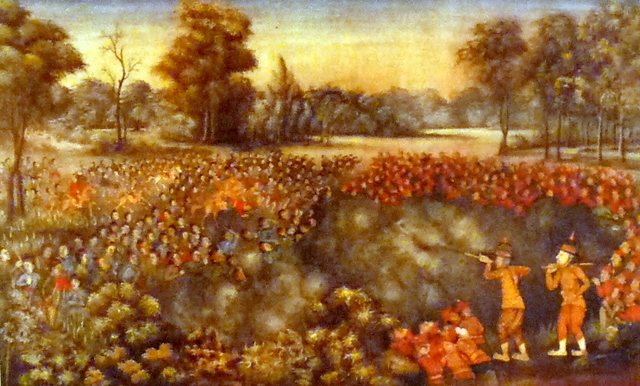
Naresaun and Ekathotsarot led Siamese army fight the army of Chiang Mai under Nawrahta Minsaw's command at Ban Sa Ket, near Pa Mok and Bang Kaeo, Ang Thong Province

In the same year Nanda Bayin sent two separate armies, one under his uncle the viceroy of Pathein, and another from Chiang Mai under his younger brother Noratra Mangsosri. Both were defeated in separate engagements before they could unite, and were driven back in retreat. Then in 1586, (Note: (Damrong 2001: 99, 103): The invasion began on the 2nd waning of the fifth Siamese month of the year of the cock, which editors translated as May 1585. The CS date would have been the 2nd waning of Caitra 947 CS (5 April 1586). It is in line with the Burmese chronicle invasion date of late Tagu of 947 ME (19 March to 9 April 1586).) Naresuan defeated the Viceroy of Chiang Mai near Pa Mok and Bang Kaeo, capturing his encampment at Ban Saket with 10,000 soldiers, 120 elephants, 100 horses, 400 boats plus arms, ammunition, and provisions.

In October 1586, (Note: (Damrong 2001: 108) says the invasion led by Nanda came in the 12th Siamese month of the year of the dog (BE 2129), which the editors translated as December 1586. The Siamese calendar at the time would have been Chula Sakarat (CS); 12th Siamese month (Karttika) of 948 CS per (Eade 1989: 133) would have been 13 October to 10 November 1586. It is in line with the Burmese chronicle (Hmannan Vol. 3 2003: 84) date as to when Nanda began the campaign: Sunday, 9th waxing of Tazaungmon of 948 ME (19 October [O.S. 9 October] 1586). Note that the Burmese and Chula Sakarat calendars were off by two days in Tazaungmon/Karttika 948 ME/CS.) Nanda Bayin himself led the Burmese armies to Ayutthaya and begin the third invasion of Ayutthaya. Nanda Bayin armies laid siege to the city for five months, but failed to take the city due to an aggressive defense by Naresuan. He retreated.

In 1590, Maha Thammarachathirat died. In July 1590, (Note: He became king on 1 July 1590 or less probably on 29 July 1590. (Damrong 2001: 116): Naresuan became king on Sunday, the 13th waning of the eighth Siamese month [Ashadha] of the year of the tiger, 952 CS. But per (Eade 1989: 134), 952 CS was a leap year, and had an extra leap month (2nd Ashadha. Per (Eade 1989: 134), 13th waning of 1st Ashadha 952 CS translates to Saturday, 30 June 1590 whereas 13th waning of 2nd Ashadha 952 CS to Monday, 30 July 1590. Neither date correctly lines up with Sunday. If the coronation did take place on a Sunday, it probably took place on Sunday, 1 July 1590 or 29 July 1590. (Damrong 2001: 116) continues that Naresuan fought a war with Burma eight months after his accession, and (Damrong 2001: 119) says that Mingyi Swa's depleted invasion army got back to Pegu in the fifth Siamese month in the year of the hare (March/April 1591), which agrees with the Burmese chronicle account (Hmannan Vol. 3 2003: 90) of Tagu 952 ME (March/April 1591). It suggests that the Burmese had been driven back from Siam at least a month earlier. Therefore it is more likely that Naresuan came to power in early July. Note that editors of (Damrong 2001: 116) translate his accession date of 13th waning of eighth Siamese month as August 1590, which could not be true as the prevailing calendar at the time was Chula Sakarat.) Naresuan was crowned King of Ayutthaya as Sanphet II.

The Burmese army led by Phra Maha Uparat attacked Siam again, but Naresuan defeated it near Ban Khoi. The Burmese army retreated back to Bago, losing many men, elephants, horses, arms, and ammunition.

== Reign as King of Ayutthaya ==
Ayutthaya during Naresuan's reign

In a series of brilliant military operations, Naresuan repelled multiple invasions, securing Ayutthaya's independence. Upon ascending the throne in 1590, he adopted an expansionist policy, capturing the Cambodian capital of Longvek and establishing suzerainty over Lan Na. He also seized the provinces of Tavoy and Tenasserim.

=== The elephant battle ===
King Naresuan is known in Thailand for his 1593 elephant duel with Crown Prince Mingyi Swa. However, most other accounts of the era mention an elephant battle but not a formal duel.

==== Ayutthaya chronicle narrative ====
In November 1592, (Note: (Damrong 2001: 122) says Swa left Pegu to begin the invasion on Wednesday, the 7th waxing of the first Siamese month of the year of the major dragon, which editors translated as January 1592. It should be Wednesday, 7th waxing of the first Siamese month (Margasirsha) of 954 CS (Thursday, 10 December [O.S. 30 November] 1592) per (Eade 1989: 134). According to the Burmese chronicles (Hmannan Vol. 3 2003: 93), the invasion began on Wednesday, 2nd waxing of Nadaw 954 ME (4 November [O.S. 25 October] 1592) when Swa left Pegu with the invasion army. The Siamese date may have been the first time Siamese sighted the Burmese troops.) Nanda Bayin ordered his son to attack Ayutthaya again. Mingyi Swa, Natshinnaung the son of the viceroy of Taungoo, and the viceroy of Prome formed three divisions. Mingyi Swa went through Three Pagodas Pass while the other two divisions came via Mae Lamao. The chief of Chiang Mai sent a boat force. Naresuan had been planning to attack Cambodia because of its border incursions, but then adjusted to the Burmese threat. Naresuan marched towards Suphan Buri and encamped his armies at Nong Sarai near the Thakhoi River. Naresuan formed a battle plan which involved a retreat, allowing the Burmese to follow, and then attack the disordered advance with his main army.

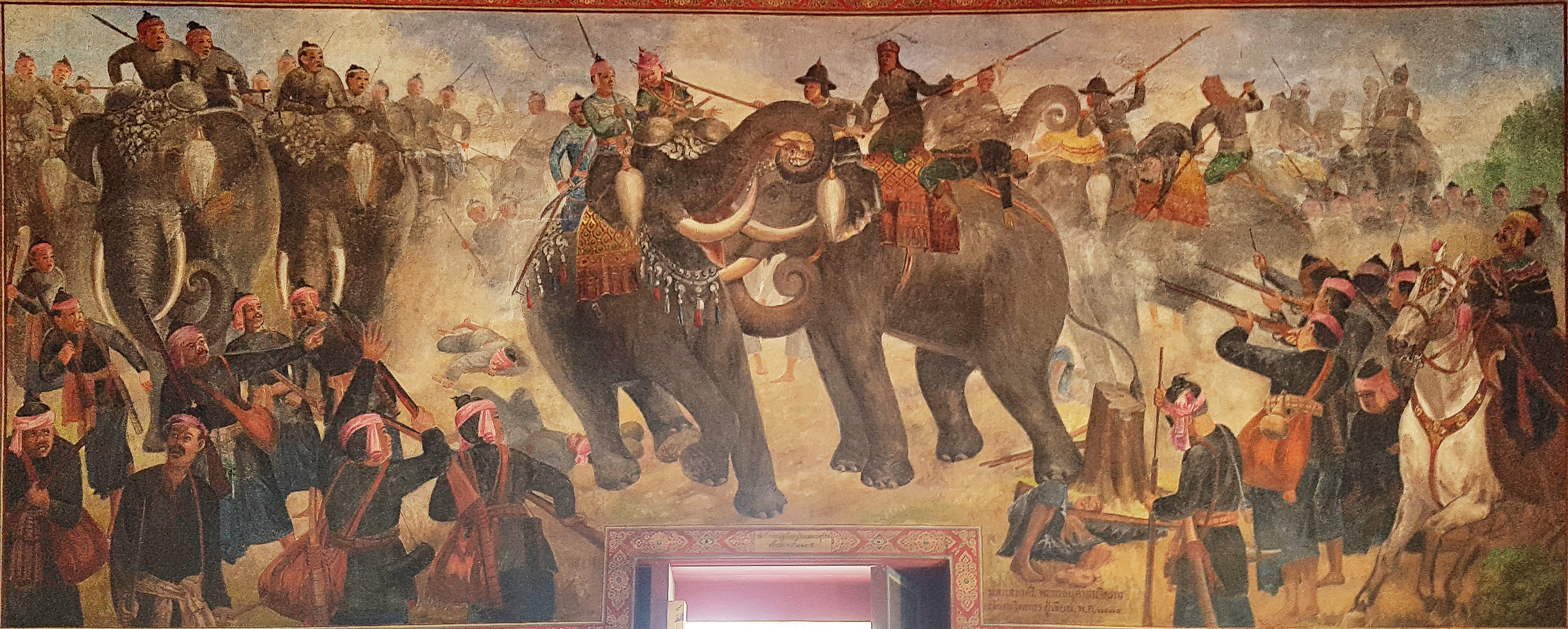
Wall mural of the elephant battle between Naresuan and Mingyi Swa at the Phra Ubosot of Wat Suwan Dararam, Ayutthaya

During the battle, in January 1593, the war elephants of Naresuan, Chaophraya Chaiyanuphap, and Ekathotsarot, Chaophraya Prap Traichak, were "in musth" and charged into the midst of the Burmese, with only a handful to Siamese being able to follow them in. According to Damrong's reconstruction, Naresuan, seeing Mingyi Swa on an elephant under a tree, shouted, "My brother, why do you stay on your elephant under the shade of a tree? Why not come out and engage in single combat to be an honour to us? There will be no kings in future who will engage in single combat like us."

The personal battle between Naresuan and Mingyi Swa was a highly romanticized historical scene known as the "Elephant Battle" (สงครามยุทธหัตถี Songkram Yuddhahatthi.)

After a prolonged duel and narrowly missing Naresuan but cutting his helmet, Naresuan was able to cut Mingyi Swa with his ngao (glaive). Prince Somdet Phra Ekathotsarot was also able to kill the governor of Muang Chacharo. The main Siamese army then arrived and the Burmese were routed and scattered. The King of Bago then ordered the other two divisions to retreat.

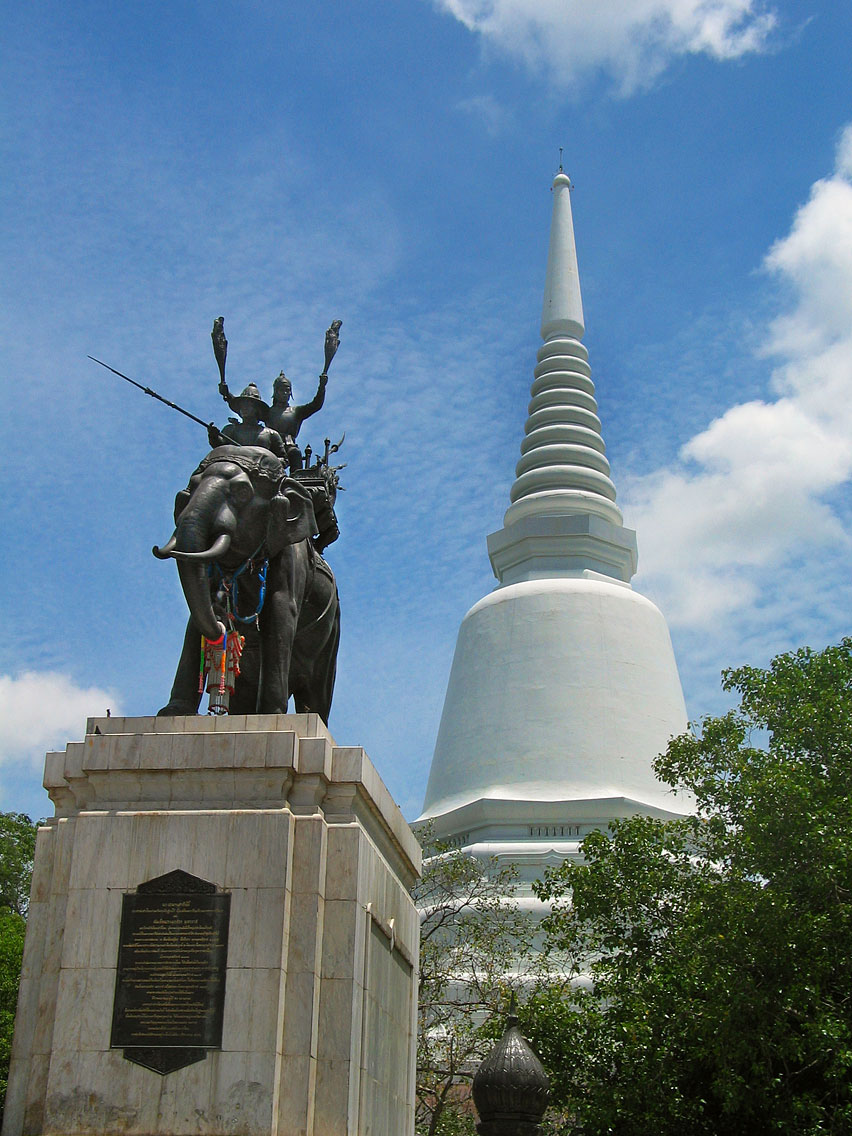
Don Chedi Monument at Suphan Buri, the royal monument of King Naresuan and the pagoda were built to commemorate the victory over the Burmese troops

Naresuan's ngao, Chao Phraya Prap Hongsawadi or "Chao Phraya which defeated Bago", and helmet, Chao Phraya Sen Phonlaphai or "Chao Phraya which defeated a hundred thousand soldiers", still exist today. Naresuan built a pagoda on the site of the elephant battle as a victory monument.

Naresuan brought before a council of judges those commanders he thought had disobeyed him or were negligent in their duties; they had been unable to follow him into the middle of the Burmese. The punishment was death. However, Somdet Phra Phanarat, a bhikkhu from Wat Yai Chai Mongkhon, calmed Naresuan enough to have the punishment rescinded. Instead, the guilty commanders were ordered to take Dawei and Tanintharyi for redemption.

==== Other accounts ====
The Burmese chronicles, however, do not mention a duel at all. They say that the two armies engage in a battle on 8 January 1593 [O.S. 29 December 1592], and Swa was felled by a shot from a Siamese firearm. According to Terwiel, there are ten different accounts of the battle by indigenous, European and Persian authors: (four Siamese, one Burmese, four late 16th and early 17th century European accounts and late 17th century one Persian account). Only one Siamese account says there was a formal elephant duel between Naresuan and Swa. However, Jeremias van Vliet's account of Siam in early 1630s includes interviews with Siamese subjects who were contemporaries of King Naresuan and who insisted that the elephant combat, which resulted in the death of the Burmese crown prince at the hands of Naresuan (whom the Siamese called "the black prince"), did indeed happen. According to Van Vliet's Description of the Siamese Kingdom:

[W]hen the Pegu prince and the young Siamese prince (both seated on elephants and dressed in royal garb) lost all self control, left both armies and attacked each other furiously. The Siamese prince ran his adversary with his lance through the body and took the other's elephant.

— Jeremian van Vliet's Description of the Kingdom of Siam (translated from Old Dutch by L. F. van Ravenswaay, 1910)

In Terwiel's analysis of the other accounts, however, the Burmese crown prince and Naresuan both fought on their war elephant in the battle, although no formal duel probably ever took place. Per Terwiel, it is highly unlikely that Swa would have agreed to a formal duel since agreeing to do so would have "jeopardized the costly invasion that had thus far progressed without a hitch." During the battle, Naresuan's elephant got surrounded by the Burmese forces. During that crucial moment, a Burmese war elephant went musth, and attacked Swa's elephant. Seeing that Swa was in difficulty, Naresuan "closed in, and he (or one of the warriors riding with him, maybe a Portuguese) fired a gun which mortally wounded the crown prince" Swa. Naresuan was "lucky to escape from a very dangerous situation" but also quick to take advantage of it. According to Terwiel, the "Burmese and European accounts stayed closer to what actually may have happened", and "Naresuan's much repeated challenge to hold a duel, even though it looms large in many Thai history books, should be relegated to a legendary tale."

=== Dawei and Tanintharyi ===
In 1593, Naresuan sent Chaophraya Chakri and Phraya Phra Khlang to attack Tanintharyi and Dawei, a Mon city, which fell after 15 and 20 day sieges respectfully. Nanda Bayin launched a Burmese fleet to defend those cities, but arrived too late and was defeated by a combined Thai fleet. Additionally, Burmese troops marching from Mottama were ambushed by the combined Chakri and Khlang force, resulting in the capture of 11 Burmese commanders, many elephants, horses, men, arms, and ammunition.

=== Capture of Longvek ===
In 1593, Naresuan launched a successful campaign to subjugate Cambodia. While some traditional accounts claim he executed the Cambodian king, Nakphra Sattha, modern historians consider this unlikely; contemporary Cambodian records, alongside accounts from Spanish and Portuguese explorers, indicate that Nakphra Sattha escaped to Vientiane, where he remained until his death.

Naresuan then brought Khmer families to populate his northern provinces.

=== Capture of Mottama ===
As Burmese control over the tributaries had weakened, the Mons took this opportunity to free themselves. The Mon governor of Mawlamyine rebelled against Bago and requested Siamese support. Naresuan sent troops to help and the Burmese abandoned their garrison at Martaban. Nanda Bayin then sent the viceroy of Taungoo to suppress the uprising, but his force was defeated. The Mon provinces then became subject to the Siamese Kingdom.

=== Invasion of Bago ===
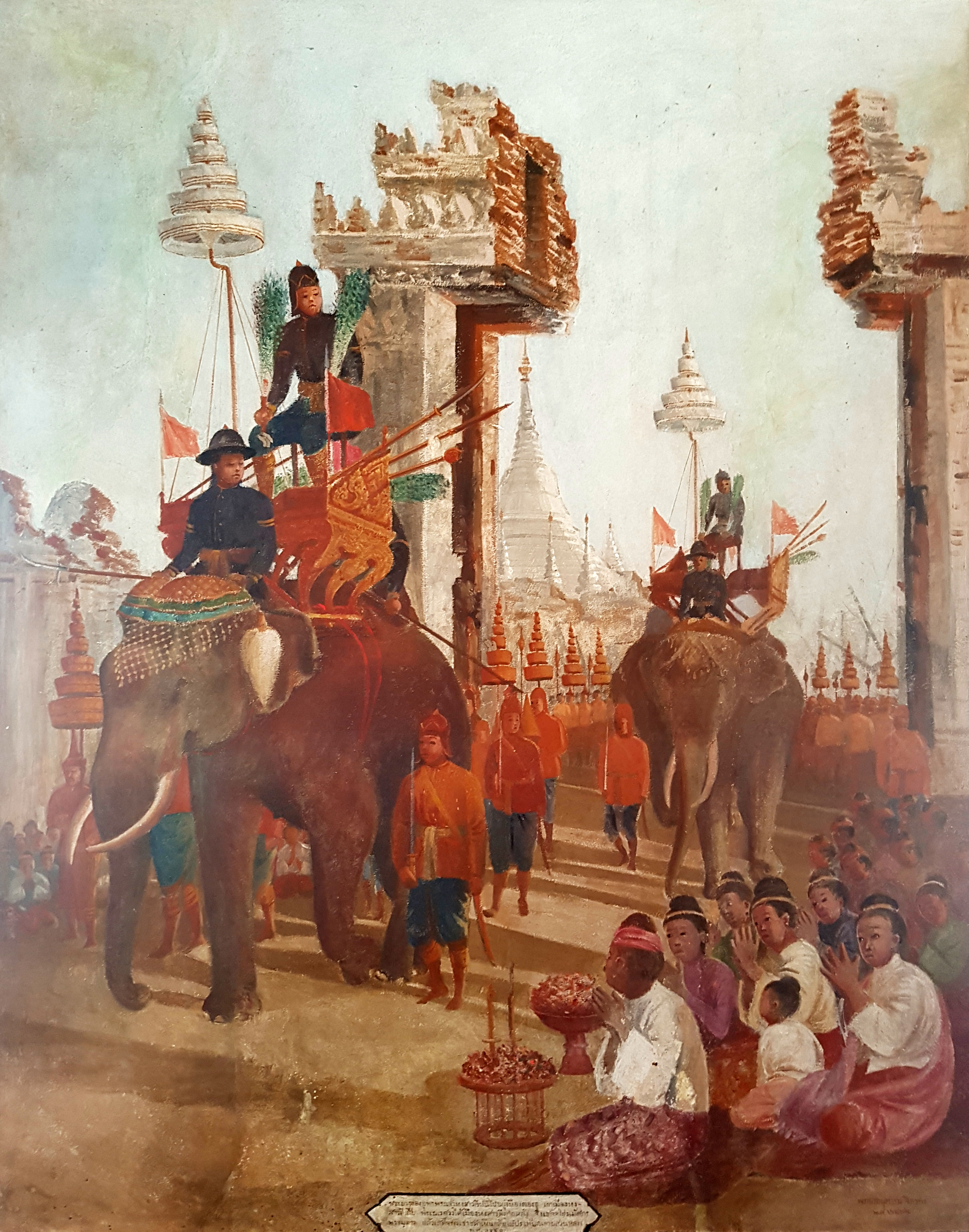
King Naresuan entered Bago near Shwemawdaw Pagoda, mural from Wat Suwan Dararam, Ayutthaya, Thailand

Naresuan then decided to attack Bago in 1595. He laid siege on the city for three months before retreating when the viceroys of Prome, Taungoo, and Ava sent relief forces. Naresuan did take back many prisoners of war, lessening the fighting strength of the Burmese.

The Lord of Prome staged a rebellion against Nanda Bayin in 1595, followed by Taungoo, Rakhine, Lan Na, and Lan Xang. King Nokeo Koumane of Lan Xang prepared to march through Lan Na to Bago to rescue the people of Lan Xang held captive. The Viceroy of Lan Na Chiang Mai then submitted his territory to Siamese control and Naresuan sent Siamese forces to prevent Laotian forces from entering Lan Na.

After these series of upheavals in the Burmese Empire, Naresuan decided to attack Bago again in 1599, using Arakan and Taungoo as allies. However, before Naresuan arrived at the city, the forces of Arakan and Taungoo had already invested the city. The Viceroy of Taungoo ended up taking the populace back to Taungoo, abandoning the city to the forces of Arakan to loot what property was left behind, and then setting flames to the palace and monasteries.

=== Invasion of Taungoo and Lan Na ===
Naresuan occupied Bago while Minye Thihathu II, Viceroy of Taungoo, had already taken Nanda Bayin to Taungoo. Naresuan requested Minye Thihathu send Nanda Bayin back to him but Minye Thihathu refused, stating he was unwell. After that Naresuan laid siege to Taungoo for two months but retreated due to lack of food.

== Death ==
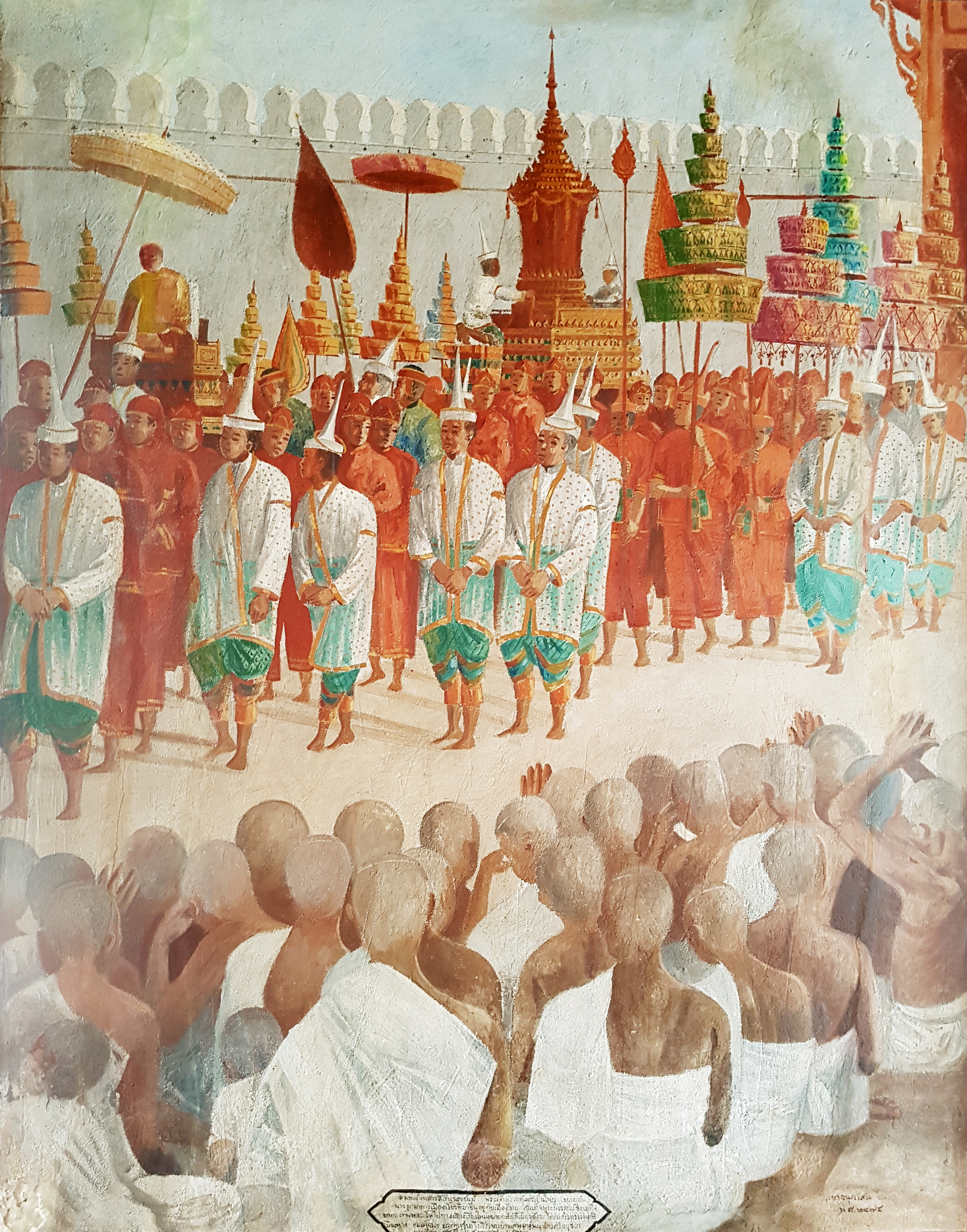
Royal funeral ceremony of King Naresuan, mural from Wat Suwan Dararam, Ayutthaya, Thailand

Natshinnaung killed Nanda Bayin while he was held captive in Toungoo. Nyaungyan Min then crowned himself as the King of Ava to counter the Viceroys of Toungoo and Prome. Siam was then free of a Burmese threat for four years until the King of Ava went on a campaign to subjugate the Shans. When he advanced as far as Theinni, Naresuan raised an army of 200,000 men to counter the threat to his kingdom. He advanced as far as the Fang District of Chiang Mai Province before falling ill and then died after three days on 25 April 1605. (Note: (Damrong 2001: 177) says Naresuan died on Monday, the 8th waxing of the sixth Siamese month in the year of minor dragon, which editors translated as June 1604. It should be Monday, 8th waxing of the sixth Siamese month (Vaisakha) of 967 CS, which per (Eade 1989: 135) translates to Monday, 25 April 1605.) His brother King Ekathotsarot became his successor as king.

Recent studies of Burmese records by historians of Silpakorn University showed that he returned to Wiang Haeng, where he died of disease, probably smallpox.

Many Shan believe King Naresuan was cremated and his ashes interred in a stupa in Mongton, in the Daen Lao Range, in the southern part of the Shan State.

== Legacy ==
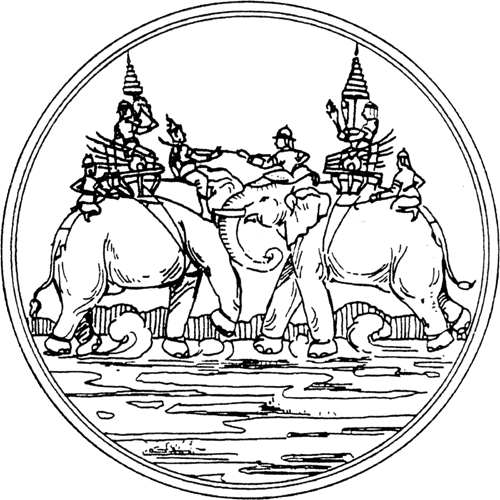
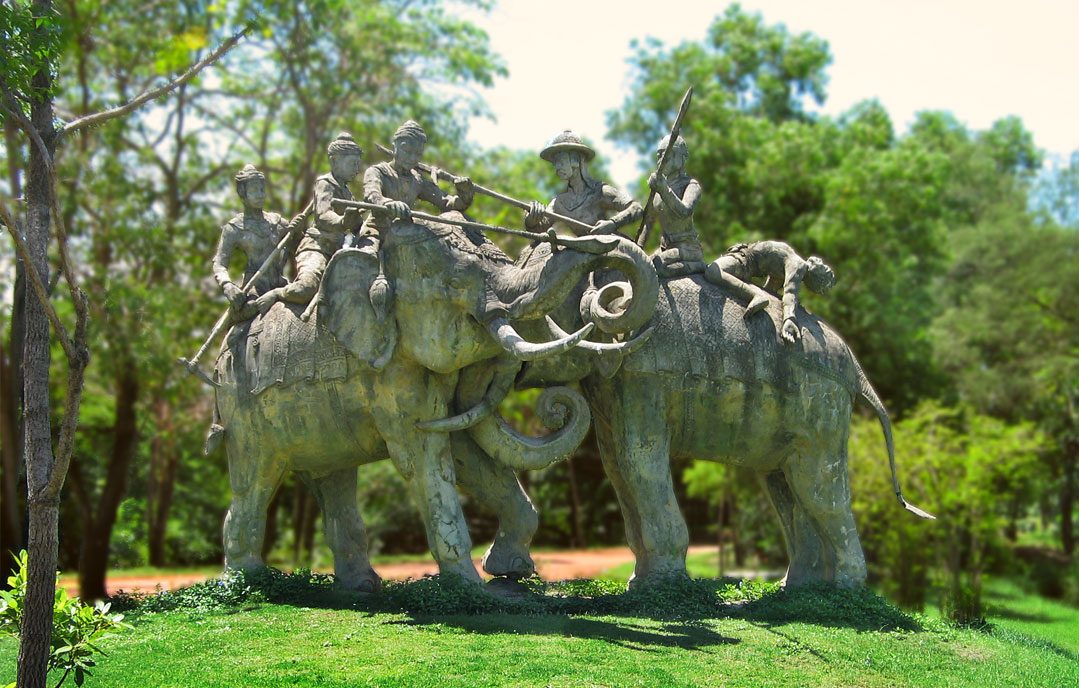
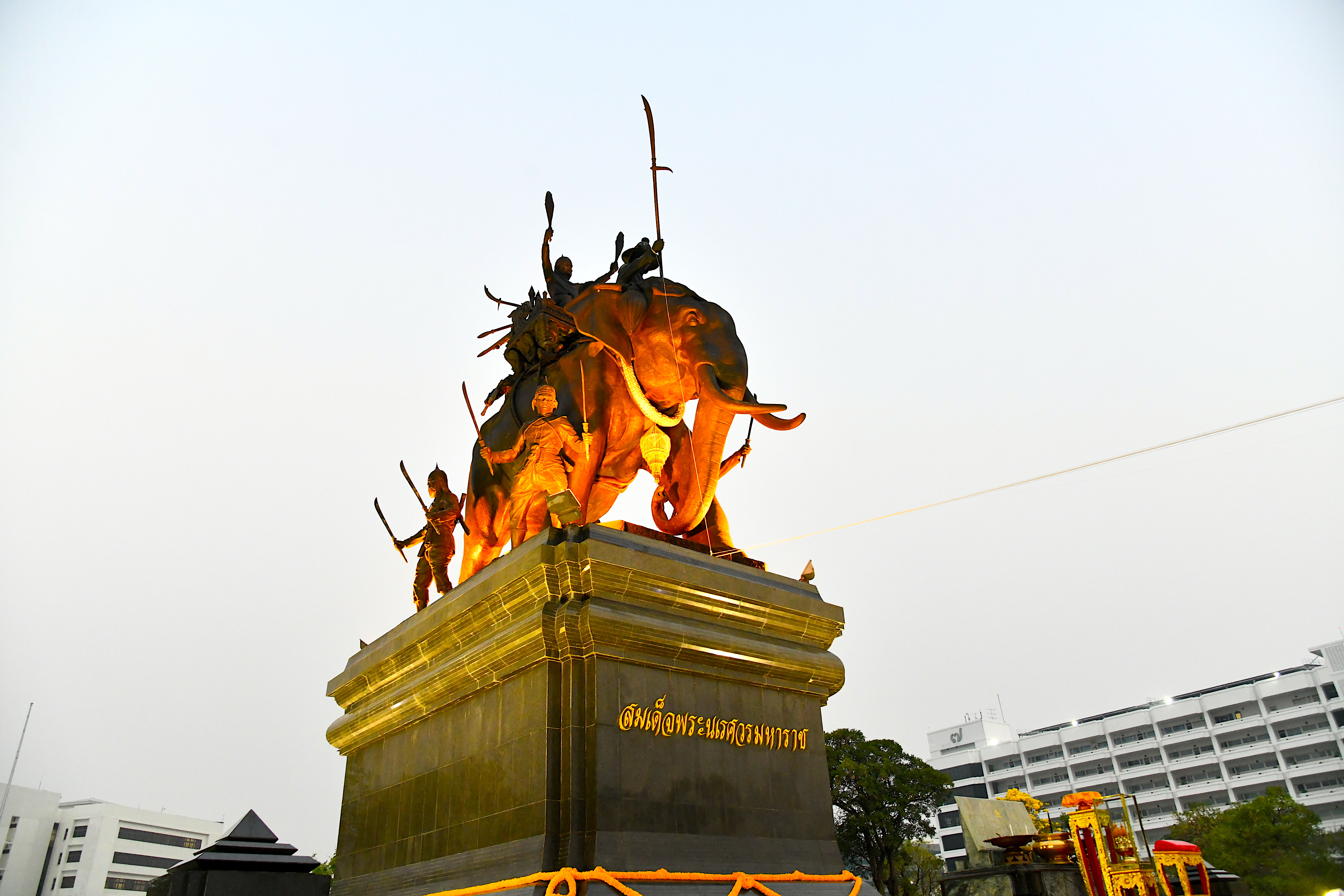
Clockwise: The elephant duel between King Naresuan (right) and Mingyi Swa (left) during the Battle of Nong Sarai, as depicted on the provincial seal of Suphan Buri Province, The statue of "The Great Battle of Yuthahatthi" in Mueang Boran, Samut Prakan Province, King Naresuan Monument at Royal Thai Armed Forces Headquarters

Naresuan's reign marked a pivotal era of territorial expansion and economic positioning for the Ayutthaya Kingdom. By liberating Siam from Burmese domination and vassalizing neighboring states such as Lan Na and Cambodia, he expanded Siamese influence to its furthest extent up to that point in history. Furthermore, his seizure of the strategic peninsular provinces of Tavoy and Tenasserim secured vital commercial ports on the Indian Ocean. These military and security consolidations laid the foundations for Ayutthaya's regional dominance and prosperity throughout the 17th century.

However, historical assessments of Naresuan reveal a complex reality. While later narratives glorify his reign, near-contemporary sources frequently describe the harshness of his frequent wars of devastation and the strict measures he employed. Moreover, the immediate aftermath of his death exposed the fragility of this expansive empire; both Lan Na and Cambodia quickly broke free from Siamese suzerainty. Following this turbulent period of warfare, Siam entered into an era of stabilized borders and 150 years of relative peace.

Naresuan's enduring legacy as a Thai national hero was largely cemented in later centuries, particularly following the Fall of Ayutthaya in 1767, when he emerged as a symbol of resistance against the aggressive Burmese empire. This nationalist historiography was heavily championed by figures like Prince Damrong Rajanubhab, who wrote: "Naresuan was recorded as a brave and glorious king. Therefore his glory is evident up to the present day. The kingdom of Siam at that period was widest in extent, opulent and redounding in glory." Today, Naresuan is treated as one of the greatest and most revered figures in Thai history textbooks.

- Thai baht banknotes
  - 100 baht note of series 12, issued with the intention of glorifying Thai monarchs in history who have been revered and honored with the title The Great.
  - 50 baht note of series 16, issued to glorify Thai kings of different periods from past to present.
- Royal Thai Armed Forces Day, 18 January, commemorates his victory in the 1593 elephant duel.
- HTMS Naresuan, Royal Thai Navy frigate.
- Naresuan University in Phitsanulok is named after the king and features a large statue of the king.
- One of the two largest dams in Phitsanulok Province is named the Naresuan Dam. It controls water flow of the Nan River north of the city of Phitsanulok.
- Thung Yai Naresuan Wildlife Sanctuary is the nation's largest conservation site.
- Following the 2014 Thai coup d'état, a free showing of a King Naresuan film was credited with making viewers feel happy.

== In popular culture ==
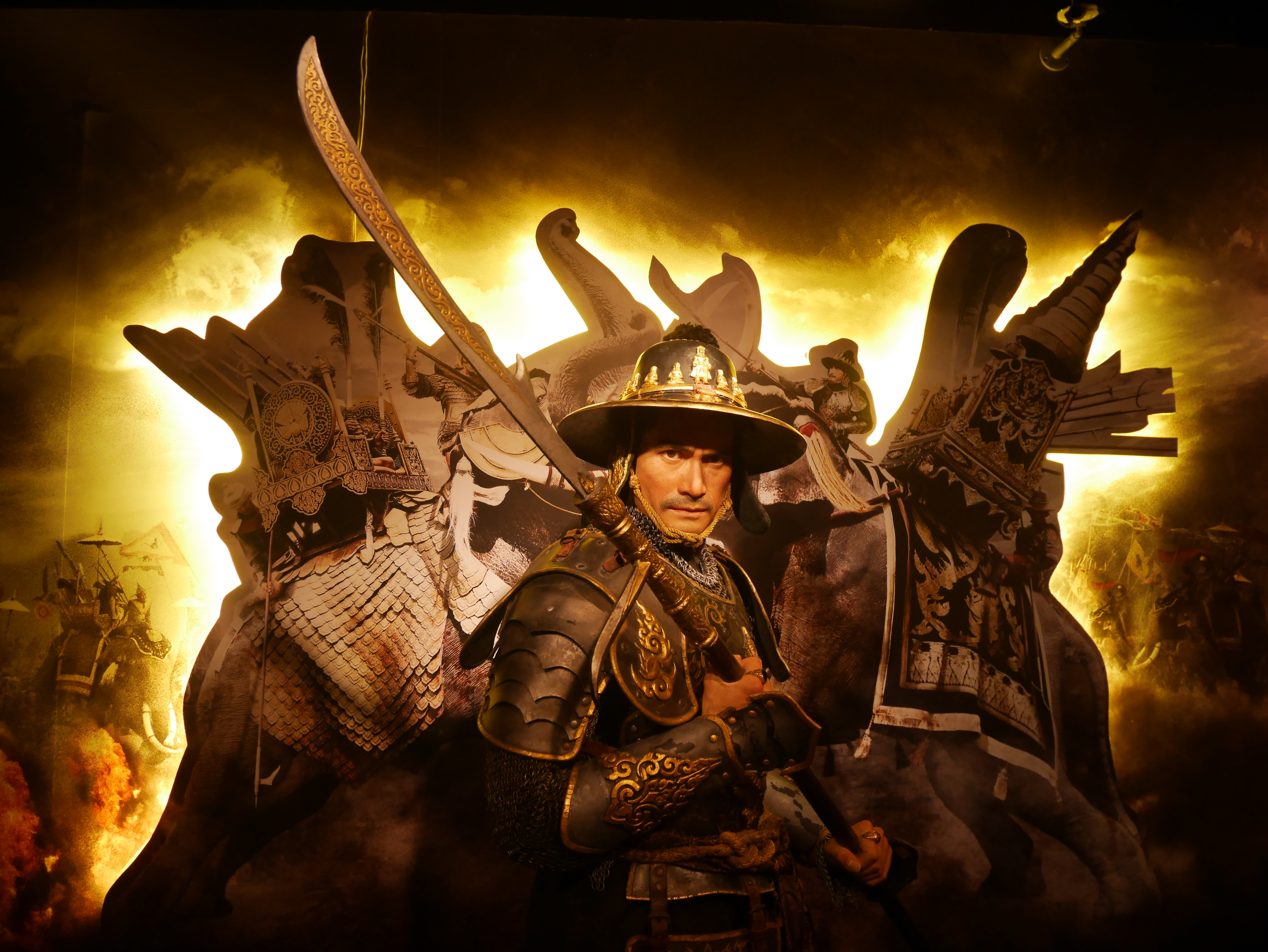
Wax figure of King Naresuan the Great from the film The Legend of King Naresuan, portrayed by Wanchana Sawasdee, exhibited at Madame Tussauds Bangkok

King Naresuan's legacy as a warrior-king and his pivotal role in Thai history have made him a prominent figure in contemporary media. His life and military exploits, particularly the legendary elephant duel, have been widely adapted into epic films, television dramas, animation, and digital games.

=== Films and television ===
- Kasattriya — A 2003 television series adaption based on historical events novel by Thailand National Artist, Thommayanti. King Naresuan was portrayed by Arnas Lapanich.
- Khan Kluay — A 2006 animated film based on the life of the king's war elephant, followed by a sequel, Khan Kluay 2. King Naresuan voice cast was portrayed by Sumet Ong-art.
- The Legend of King Naresuan — An epic historical film series released between 2007 and 2015, depicting the king's life from childhood to his reign. King Naresuan was portrayed by Wanchana Sawasdee.
- The Legend of King Naresuan: The Series — A 2017 television series adaptation based on the historical events. King Naresuan was portrayed by Daweerit Chullasapya.
- Hongsawadee: The Last Duel — A 2026 television series adaption based on Naresuan's time in Hanthawaddy with a young Mingyi Swa. King Naresuan was portrayed by Porapat Srikajorndecha.

=== Gaming and literature ===
- King Naresuan Online — A fantasy MMORPG released in 2010 by KNO, featuring quests and environments based on the historical period.
- Civilization V — A strategy game released in September 2010, where Siam features a unique military unit named "Naresuan's Elephant" in honor of the king's cavalry.
- Ayutthaya, Oh Irrawaddy — A Boys' love manga (webtoon) first gaining significant popularity in 2022, featuring a fictionalized version of Naresuan in a parallel universe setting.

== See alsos ==
- Burmese–Siamese War (1584–1593)
- Siamese-Cambodian War (1591-1594)
- Great Siamese invasion of Burma (1593-1600)
- Elephant duel

== Notes ==
Naresuan Sukhothai dynasty Born: 1555/56 Died: 25 April 1605
Regnal titles
Preceded by Maha Thammaracha	King of Ayutthaya; 1 July 1590 – 25 April 1605	Succeeded by Ekathotsarot
Vacant Title last held by Mahin	Viceroy of Ayutthaya; 1571–1590	Succeeded by Ekathotsarot
Vacant Title last held by Maha Thammaracha	Ruler of Phitsanulok; 1572–1590	Succeeded by Ekathotsarot
