= Elephant duel =

Historical martial practice in Southeast Asia

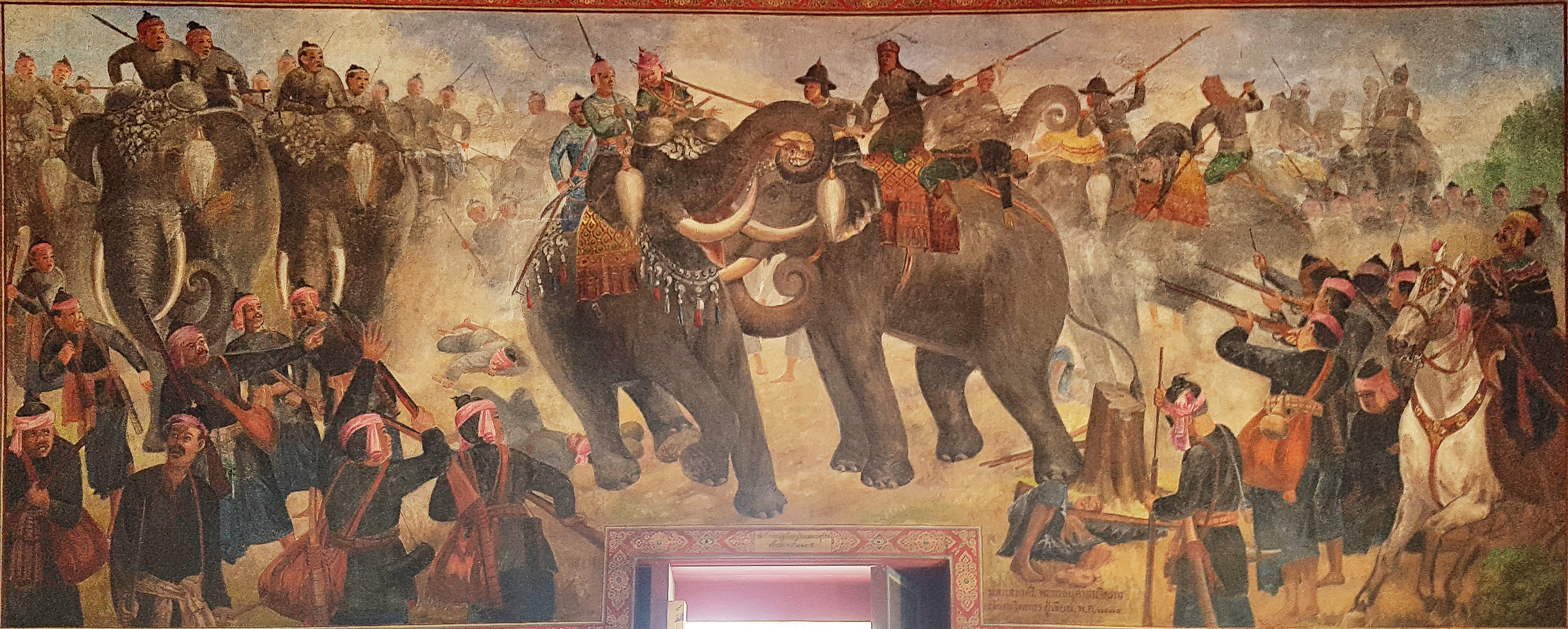
Wall mural of the elephant battle between Naresuan and Mingyi Swa at the Phra Ubosot of Wat Suwan Dararam, Ayutthaya (1931)

Elephant duels were a historical martial practice where opposing army leaders engaged each other on the battlefield in single combat on the back of war elephants. They are documented in historical records from Southeast Asia, mainly in present-day Cambodia from the 11th centuries and Burma and Thailand from the 13th to 16th centuries.

Some authors describe elephant duels as a semi-ritualized engagement, held between high-ranking leaders of equal status to determine the outcome of a conflict in lieu of full-on fighting between large armies of comparable strength which would otherwise lead to massive casualties. Others apply the term to any engagement between mounted elites in the battlefield.

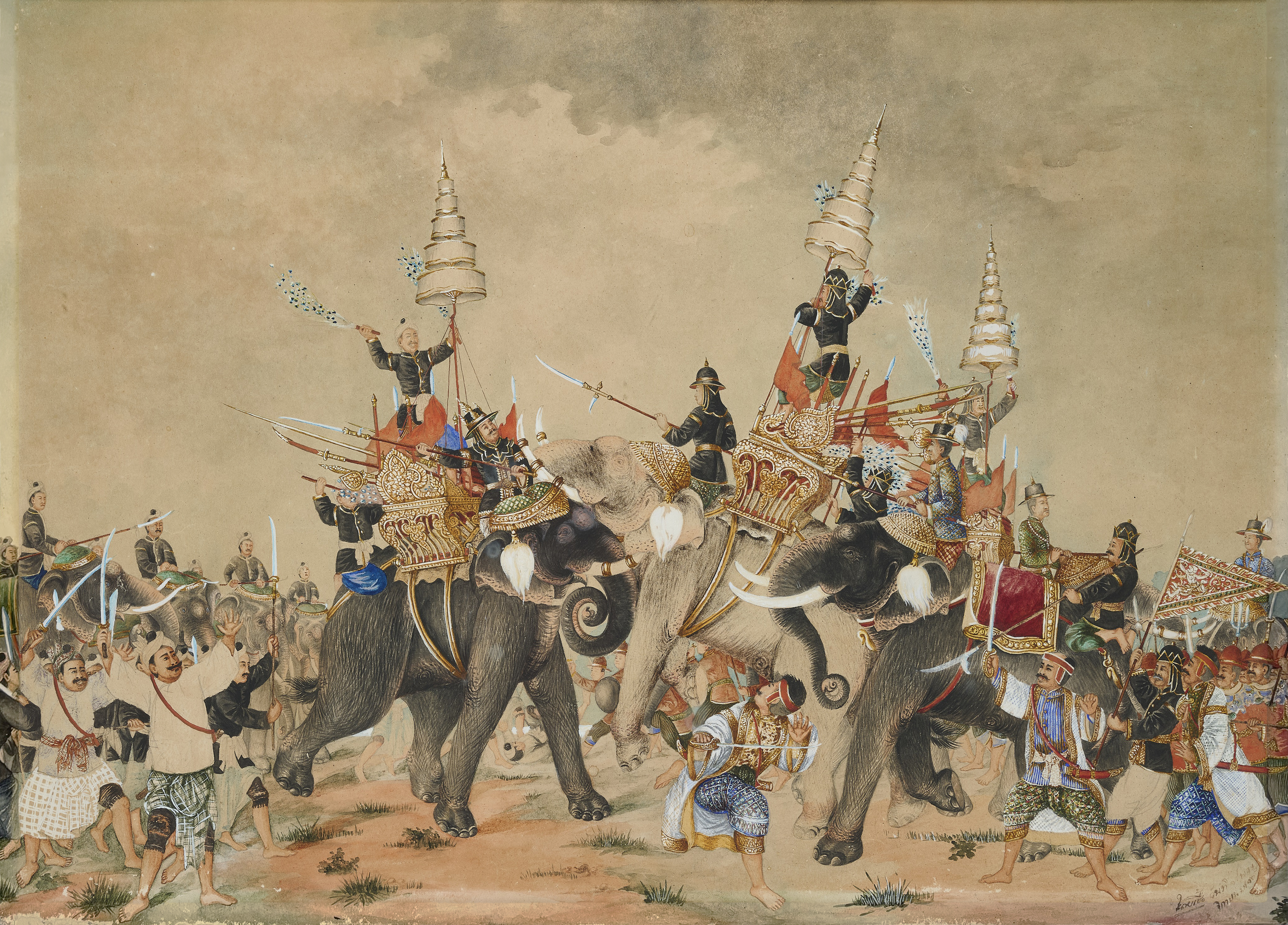
Queen Suriyothai on her war elephant putting herself between Viceroy Thado Dhamma Yaza I of Prome and King Maha Chakkraphat in 1548

The practice in Southeast Asia is believed (as first proposed by Prince Damrong Rajanubhab in Our Wars with the Burmese) to have been influenced by the Sri Lankan Buddhist chronicle Mahāvaṃsa, which describes a duel between Duṭṭhagāmaṇī and the Tamil king Eḷāra in the 2nd century BC. Probably by this association, duels were seen as a heroic deed that demonstrated a ruler's prowess and prestige.

The earliest mentions of elephant duels in Thailand are found in inscriptions and chronicles of Sukhothai and Lanna from the late 13th century. The last duel in history—and probably the most famous, featuring prominently in Thai historiography—was that between King Naresuan of Ayutthaya and the Burmese uparaja Mingyi Swa at the battle of Nong Sarai in 1593. However, the legendary duel itself is likely apocryphal. Analyzing various primary sources, Barend Jan Terwiel in 2013 concluded that the confrontation did not involve a formal duel in the strict sense. In any case, the spread of firearms introduced by the Portuguese rendered elephant-mounted combat largely obsolete after the 16th century, and elephant duels subsequently disappeared from the pages of history.
