= Luang Prasoet Chronicle =

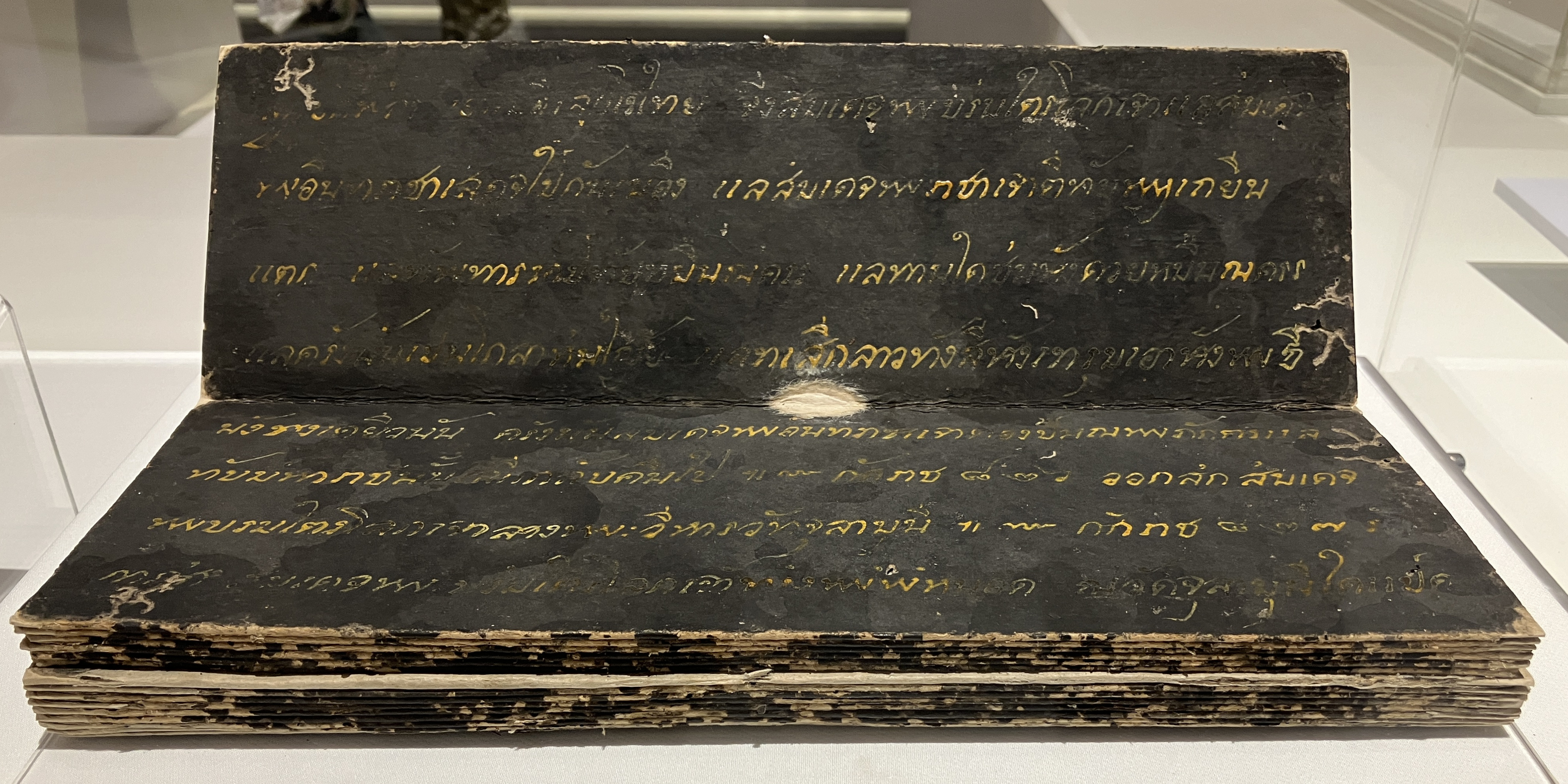
Original samut khoi manuscript of the Luang Prasoet Chronicle

The Royal Chronicle of the Old Kingdom: Luang Prasoet Version (Thai: พระราชพงศาวดารกรุงเก่า ฉบับหลวงประเสริฐ), commonly known as the Luang Prasoet Chronicle, is a manuscript of the Royal Chronicles of Ayutthaya—a historical account of the Kingdom of Ayutthaya, a former kingdom in present-day Thailand. It was discovered and brought to the Vajirañāṇa Royal Library by a Thai nobleman, Luang Prasoet-aksonnit (Phae Talalak), in 1907, and was thus named after him in his honour.

According to its preface, the document was compiled in 1680. (Note: The preface of the document states that its compilation was ordered on Wednesday, the 12th day of the waxing moon of the 5th month of the Year of the Monkey, 2223 Buddhist Era, which corresponds to Wednesday, 10 April 1680 Common Era.) It presents the chronicle in an abridged version, and its dating is considered by historians to be mostly accurate, unlike other versions which may have been subject to later copying errors. Michael Vickery, who has argued against the reliability of other Ayutthayan chronicle traditions, wrote that this one "has so far proven resistant to any attempt to discredit it". Siroch Sittisombut treats it as the most authoritative of the royal chronicles, and notes that it records no Ayutthayan sack of Angkor before 1431, where other versions carry conquests in 1369 and 1388.

Because it is abridged, its entries are often a single line. Its notice of Bayinnaung's campaign of 1563 puts the surrender of Maha Thammaracha down to famine and epidemic at Phitsanulok, where the Royal Autograph version and the Burmese and Dutch accounts each give a different cause. It also dates the Buddha image of Wat Phanan Choeng twenty-six years before the foundation of Ayutthaya in 1351, which is used as evidence of settlement on the site before that year.
