= Wat Suwan Dararam =

Buddhist temple in Thailand

Wat Suwan Dararam Ratchaworawihan
- วัดสุวรรณดารารามราชวรวิหาร
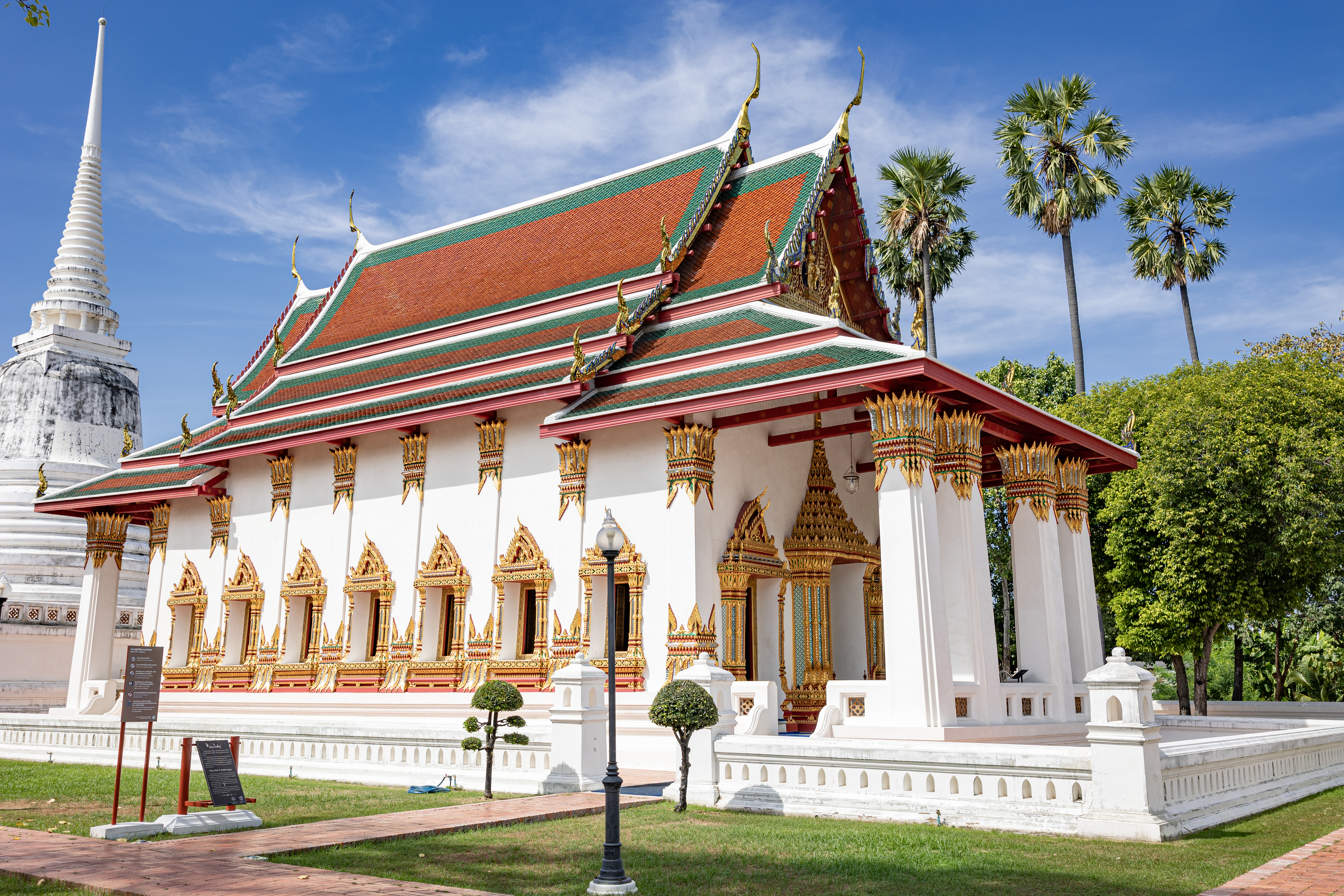

Religion
- Affiliation: Buddhist
- Sect: Theravāda
- Status: First-class royal temple

Location
- Location: Phra Nakhon Si Ayutthaya district
- Country: Thailand
- Interactive map of Wat Suwan Dararam Ratchaworawihan
- Coordinates: 14°20′56″N 100°34′43″E

Wat Suwan Dararam Ratchaworawihan (Thai: วัดสุวรรณดารารามราชวรวิหาร) is a first-class royal temple in Ayutthaya, Thailand.
