= Sukhothai Historical Park =

UNESCO World Heritage Site in Sukhothai province Thailand

UNESCO World Heritage Site
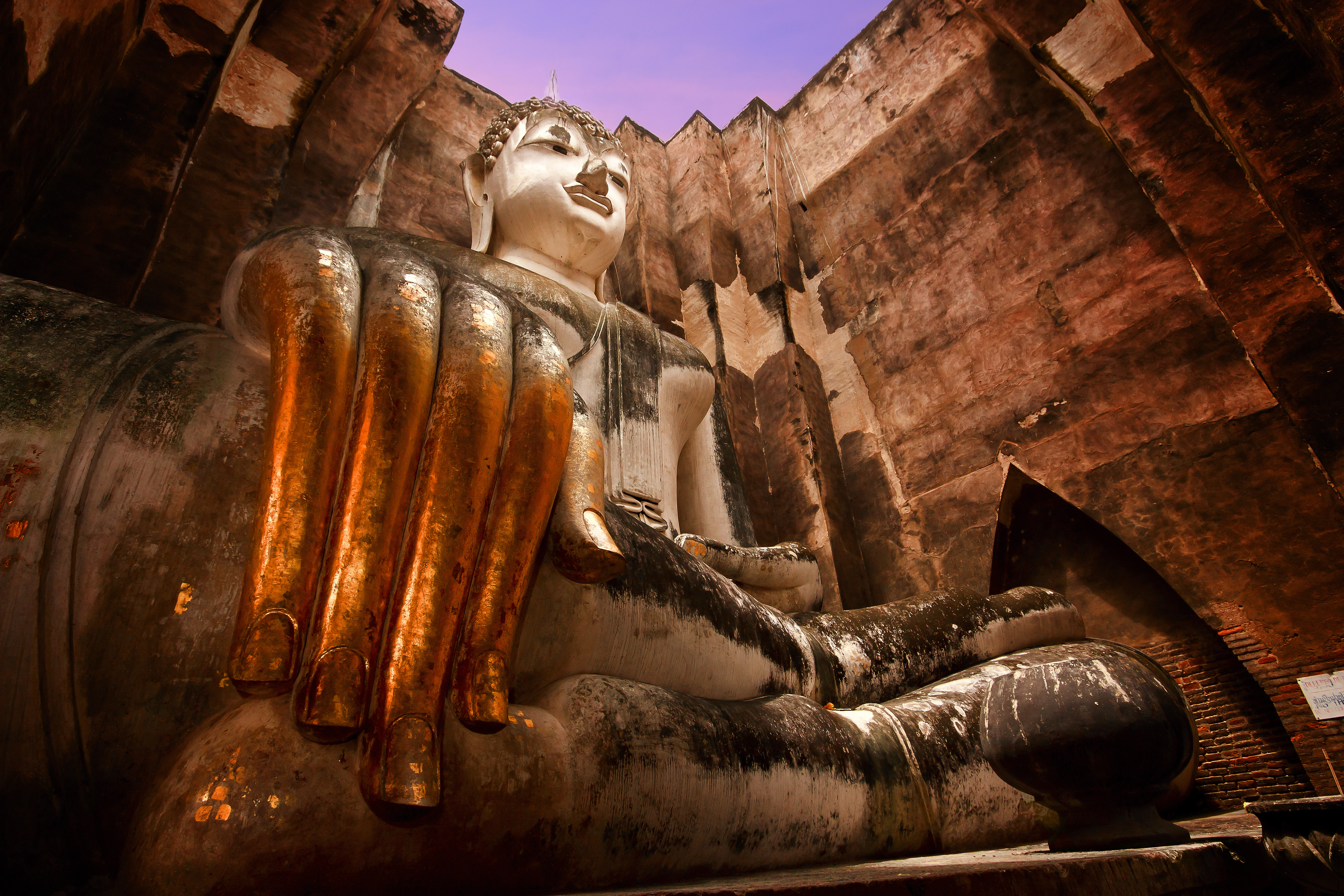
- Buddha statue at Wat Si Chum

- Location within Thailand
- Location: Sukhothai, Thailand
- Part of: Historic Town of Sukhothai and Associated Historic Towns
- Criteria: Cultural: i, iii
- Reference: 574-001
- Inscription: 1991 (15th Session)
- Area: 7,000 ha (17,000 acres)
- Coordinates: 17°01′16″N 99°42′13″E

Sukhothai Historical Park (Thai: อุทยานประวัติศาสตร์สุโขทัย (Pronunciation)) covers the ruins of Sukhothai, literally 'dawn of happiness', capital of the Sukhothai Kingdom in the 13th and 14th centuries, in north central Thailand. It is near the city of Sukhothai Thani, capital of Sukhothai province.

The city's walls form a rectangle about 2 km (1.2 mi) east-west by 1.6 km (0.99 mi) north-south. There are 193 ruins on 70 km^{2} (27 sq mi) of land. There is a gate in the centre of each wall. Inside are the remains of the royal palace and twenty-six temples, the largest being Wat Mahathat. The park is maintained by the Fine Arts Department of Thailand with help from UNESCO, which has declared it a World Heritage Site. Each year, the park welcomes thousands of visitors.

== History ==
=== Khmer era ===
Originally, Sukhothai was a Khmer empire's outpost named Sukhodaya. During the reign of Khmer Empire, the Khmers built some monuments there, several of them survived in Sukhothai Historical Park such as the Ta Pha Daeng shrine, Wat Phra Phai Luang, and Wat Sisawai. About some 50 kilometer north of Sukhothai is another Khmer military outpost of Si Satchanalai or Sri Sajanalaya.

In the mid-13th century, the Tai tribes led by Si Indradit rebelled against the Khmer governor at Sukhodaya and established Sukhothai as an independent Tai state and remained the center of Tai power until the end of the fourteenth century.

=== Liberation from Khmer Empire (Lavo) ===
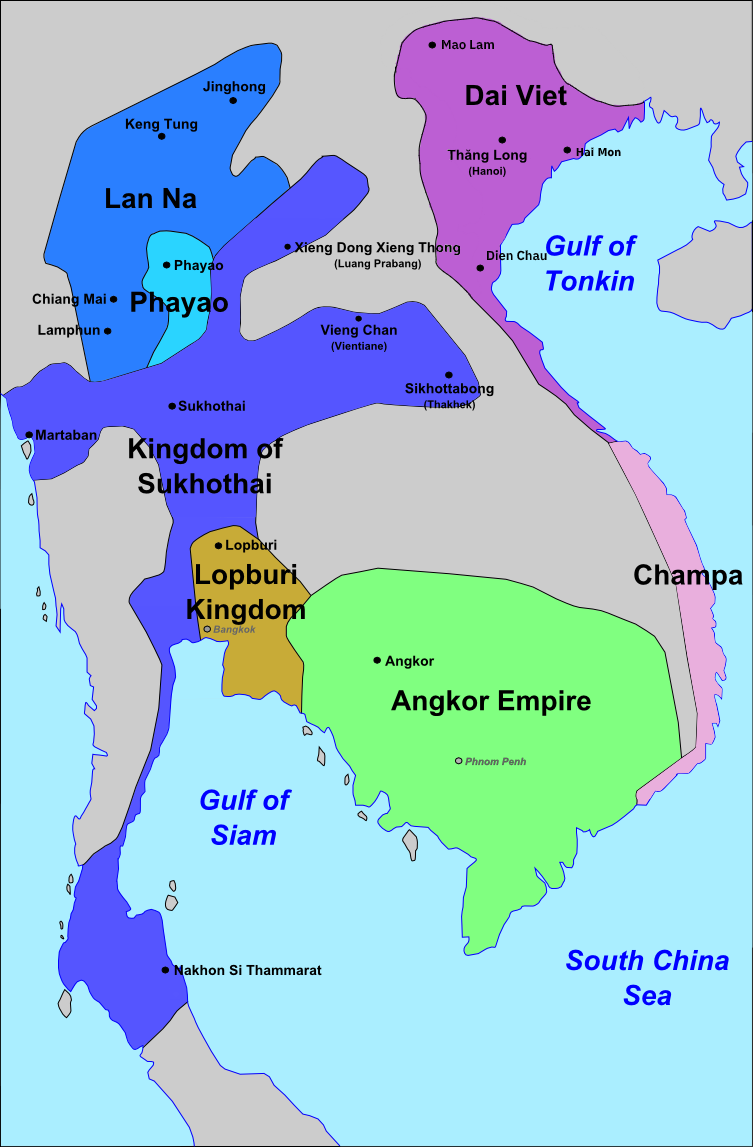
Zones of influence of Sukhothai and its neighbours, c. 1300

Prior to the 13th century, a succession of Tai kingdoms existed in the northern highlands including the Ngoenyang (centered on Chiang Saen, predecessor of Lan Na) kingdom and the Heokam (centered on Chiang Hung, modern Jinghong in China) kingdom of Tai Lue people. Sukhothai had been a trade center and part of Lawo, which was under the domination of the Khmer Empire. The migration of Tai people into the upper Chao Phraya valley was somewhat gradual.

Modern historians believe that the secession of Sukhothai (once known as Sukhodaya) from the Khmer empire began as early as 1180 during the reign of Pho Khun Sri Naw Namthom who was the ruler of Sukhothai and the peripheral city of Sri Satchanalai (modern day Si Satchanalai District in Sukhothai Province). Sukhothai had enjoyed substantial autonomy until it was re-conquered around 1180 by the Mons of Lawo under Khomsabad Khlonlampong.

Two brothers, Pho Khun Bangklanghao and Pho Khun Phameung took Sukhothai from Mon hands in 1239. Khun (ขุน) before becoming a Thai feudal title, was a Tai title for a ruler of a fortified town and its surrounding villages, together called a muang; in older usage prefixed pho (พ่อ) 'father', Comparable in sound and meaning to rural English 'paw'. Bangklanghao ruled Sukhothai as Sri Indraditya and began the Phra Ruang dynasty. He expanded his kingdom to bordering cities. At the end of his reign in 1257, the Sukhothai Kingdom covered the entire upper valley of the Chao Phraya River (then known simply as Menam, 'mother of waters', the generic Thai name for rivers.)

Traditional Thai historians considered the founding of the Sukhothai Kingdom as the beginning of the Thai nation because little was known about the kingdoms prior to Sukhothai. Modern historical studies demonstrate that Thai history began before Sukhothai. Yet the foundation of Sukhothai is still a celebrated event.

=== Expansions under Ramkamhaeng ===
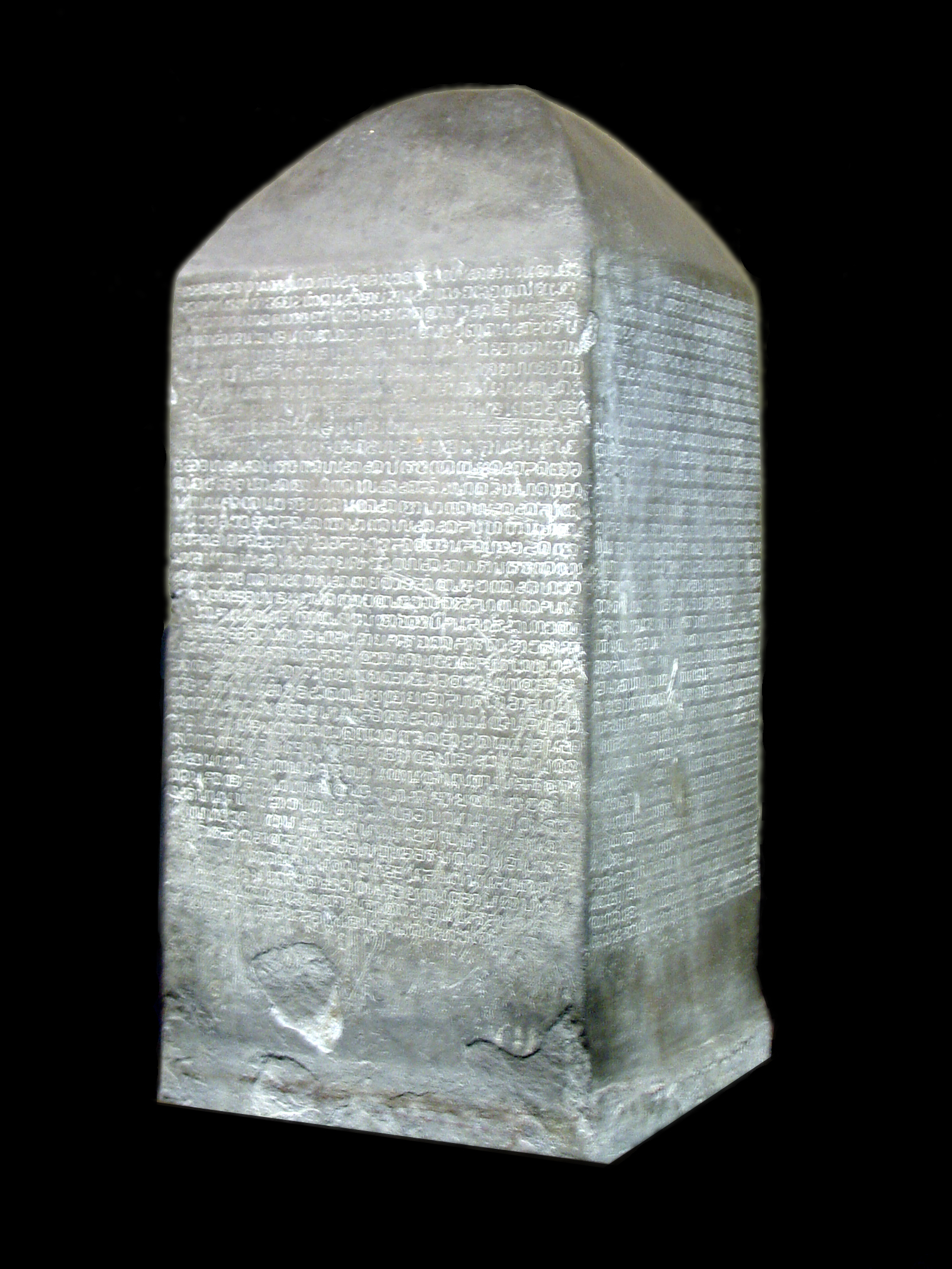
Inscription stele of King Ram Kamhaeng the Great

Pho Khun Ban Muang and his brother Ram Khamhaeng expanded the Sukhothai Kingdom. To the south, Ramkamhaeng subjugated the kingdoms of Supannabhum and Sri Thamnakorn (Tambralinga) and, through Tambralinga, adopted Theravada as the state religion. To the north, Ramkamhaeng put Phrae and Muang Sua (Luang Prabang) under tribute.

To the west, Ramkhamhaeng helped the Mons under Wareru (who is said to have eloped with Ramkamhaeng's daughter) to free themselves from Pagan domination and establish a kingdom at Martaban (they later moved to Pegu). So, Thai historians considered the Kingdom of Martaban a Sukhothai tributary. In practice, Sukhothai domination may not have extended that far.

With regard to culture, Ramkhamhaeng had the monks from Sri Thamnakorn propagate the Theravada religion in Sukhothai. In 1283, Ramkamhaeng is said to have invented Thai script, incorporating it into the controversial Ramkamhaeng Stele discovered by Mongkut 600 years later.

It was also during this period that the first contacts with Yuan dynasty were established and Sukhothai began sending trade missions to China. One well-known export of Sukhothai was the Sangkalok (Song dynasty pottery). This was the only period that Siam produced Chinese-styled ceramics, which fell out of use by the 14th century.

=== Decline and domination of Ayutthaya ===
Sukhothai domination was short-lived. After the death of Ramkhamhaeng in 1298, Sukhothai's tributaries broke away. Ramkhamhaeng was succeeded by his son, Loe Thai. The vassal kingdoms, first Uttaradit in the north, then soon after the Laotian kingdoms of Luang Prabang and Vientiane (Wiangchan), liberated themselves. In 1319 the Mon state to the west broke away, and in 1321 the Lanna absorbed Tak, one of the oldest towns under the control of Sukhothai. To the south, the powerful city of Suphanburi also broke free early in the reign of Loe Thai. Thus the kingdom was quickly reduced to its former local importance only. Finally in 1378, the armies of the expanding Ayutthaya Kingdom invaded and forced Sukhothai's King Thammaracha II to yield to this new power. After the Battle of Sittaung River in 1583, King Naresuan of Phitsanulok (and crown prince of Ayutthaya) forcibly relocated people from Sukhothai and surrounding areas to the Southern Central plain, due to the war with the Burmese and an earthquake.

=== Later development ===
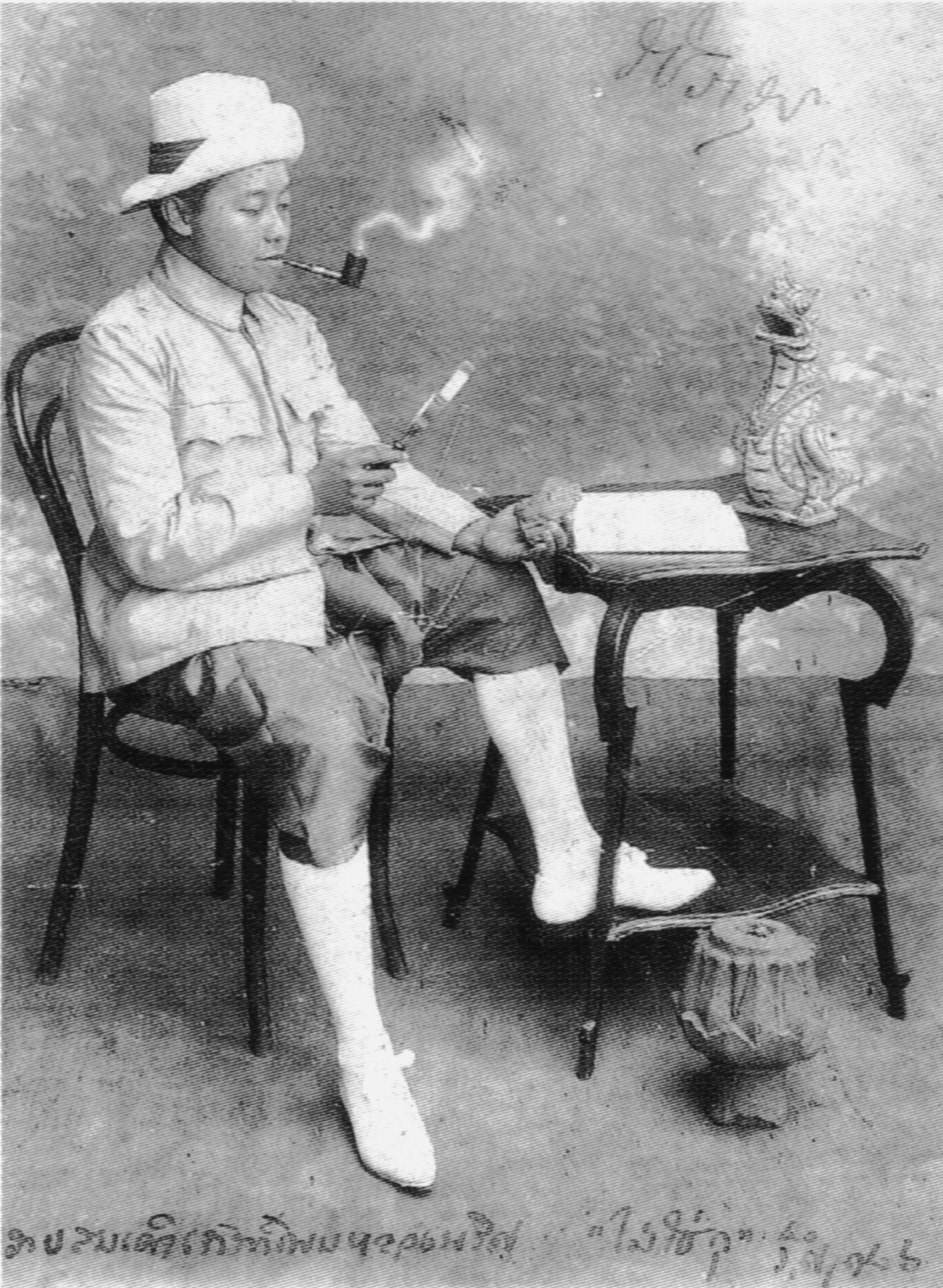
Crown prince Vajiravudh conducted archaeological research at Sukhothai in 1907

Sukhothai repopulated again but declined due to successive Burmese–Siamese wars, especially the Burmese–Siamese War (1765–67). In 1793 Rama I, after establishing Bangkok as a new capital city of the kingdom, founded New Sukhothai in Thani, 12 km (7.5 mi) to the east of old Sukhothai, thus abandoning Sukhothai. In 1801 Rama I commissioned the construction of many royal temples in the capital city. He ordered that old Buddha images be brought to Bangkok from the ruined temples around the country. One of the Buddha images is the famous eight metre (25-foot) tall bronze Phra Sri Sakyamuni (Thai: พระศรีศากยมุนี; RTGS: phra si sakkayamuni), the principal Buddha image of Wat Suthat, which was the principal Buddha image of Wat Mahathat, the biggest temple in Sukhothai. In 1833 Mongkut, during his monkhood, travelled to Sukhothai and discovered the controversial Ramkhamhaeng stele in Wat Mahathat and other artifacts, now in the National Museum in Bangkok. The formal name of this stone is The King Ram Khamhaeng Inscription Documentary heritage inscribed on the Memory of the World Register in 2003 by UNESCO.

In 1907, Vajiravudh, as crown prince, conducted a two-month archaeological field trip to Nakhon Sawan, Kampheang Phet, Sukhothai, Si Satchanalai, Uttaradit, and Pitsanulok. He later published "Phra Ruang City Journey" (Thai: เที่ยวเมืองพระร่วง; RTGS: Thiao Muang Phra Ruang) to promote historical and archaeological study by the public. The work has been used by later archaeologists and historians including Damrong Rajanubhab, the founder of the modern Thai educational system and George Coedès, a 20th-century scholar of southeast Asian archaeology and history.

In July 1988 the historical park was officially opened. On 12 December 1991, it was declared a World Heritage Site as part of the Historic Town of Sukhothai and Associated Historic Towns together with the associated historical parks in Kamphaeng Phet and Si Satchanalai.

== Management ==
Sukhothai Historical Park is managed by the Fine Arts Department, Ministry of Culture. The protection of the area was first announced in the Royal Gazette on 6 June 1962. The enabling law is the Act on Ancient Monuments, Antiques, Objects of Art and National Museums, B.E. 2504 (1961) as amended by Act (No. 2), B.E. 2535 (1992).

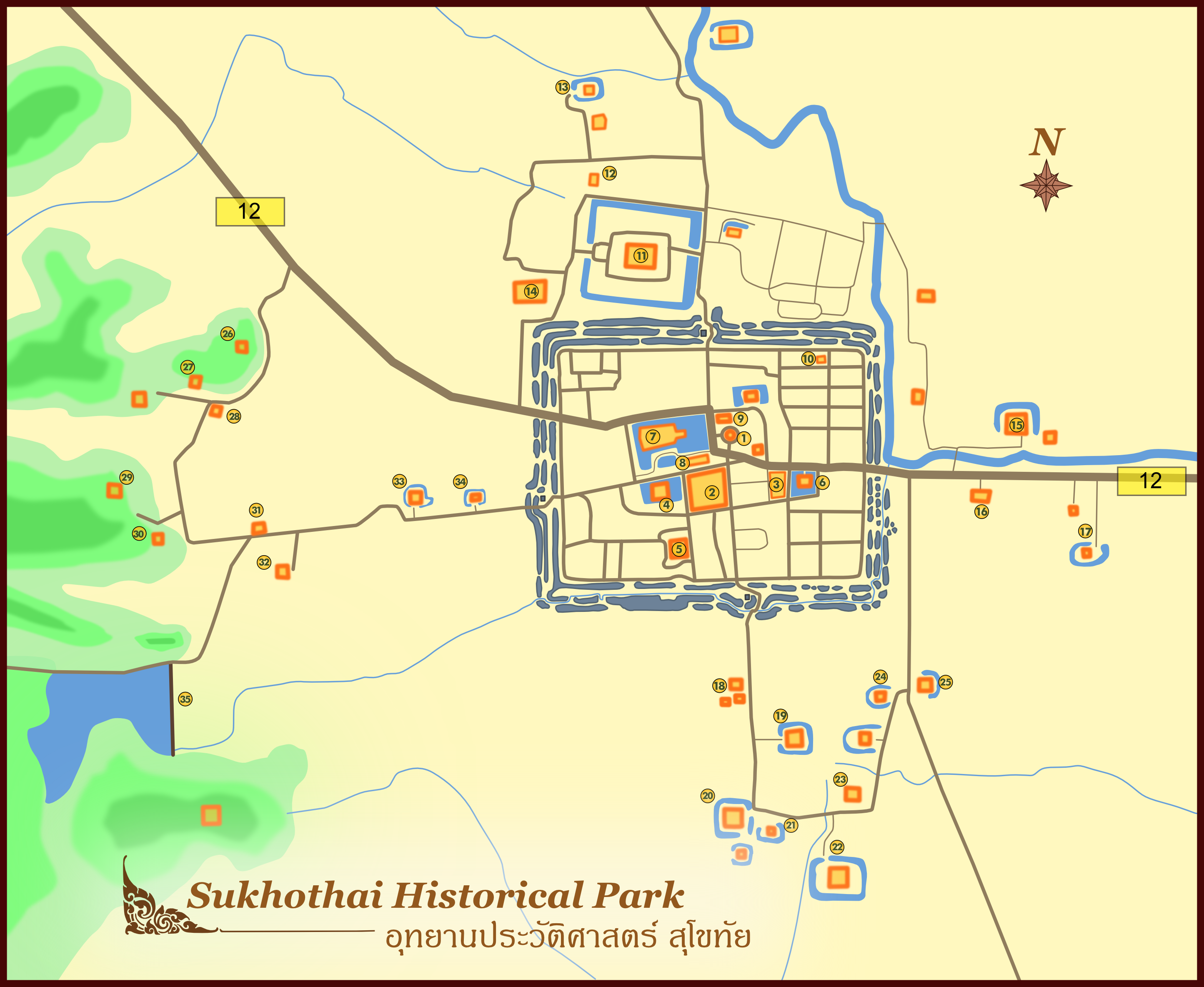
Map of Sukhothai Historical Park: 1. King Ramkhamhaeng Monument; 2. Wat Mahāthāt; 3. Ramkhamhaeng National Museum; 4. Wat Traphang Ngoen; 5. Wat Sri Sawai (Wat Sri Svāya); 6. Wat Traphang Thong; 7. Wat Sra Sri (Wat Sa Si); 8. Wat Chana Songkhrām; 9. Wat Trakuan; 10. San Ta Pha Daeng (Ta Pha Daeng Shrine); 11. Wat Phra Phai Luang; 12. Turiang Kilns; 13. Wat Sangkhawat (Wat Sanghāvāsa); 14. Wat Si Chum; 15. Wat Chang Lom; 16. Wat Thraphang Thong Lang; 17. Wat Chedi Sung; 18. Wat Kon Laeng; 19. Wat Ton Chan; 20. Wat Chetuphon; 21. Wat Chedi Si Hong; 22. Wat Si Phichit Kirati Kanlayaram (Sri Vicitrakirtikanlyārāma); 23. Wat Wihan Thong, 24. Wat Asokaram; 25. Wat Mum Langka; 26. Wat Saphan Hin; 27. Wat Aranyik (Wat Arannika); 28. Wat Chang Rop; 29. Wat Chedi Ngam; 30. Wat Tham Hip; 31. Wat Mangkon; 32. Wat Phra Yuen; 33. Wat Pa Mamuang; 34. Wat Thuek; 35. Phra Ruang Dam

== Sights ==
=== Wat Mahathat ===
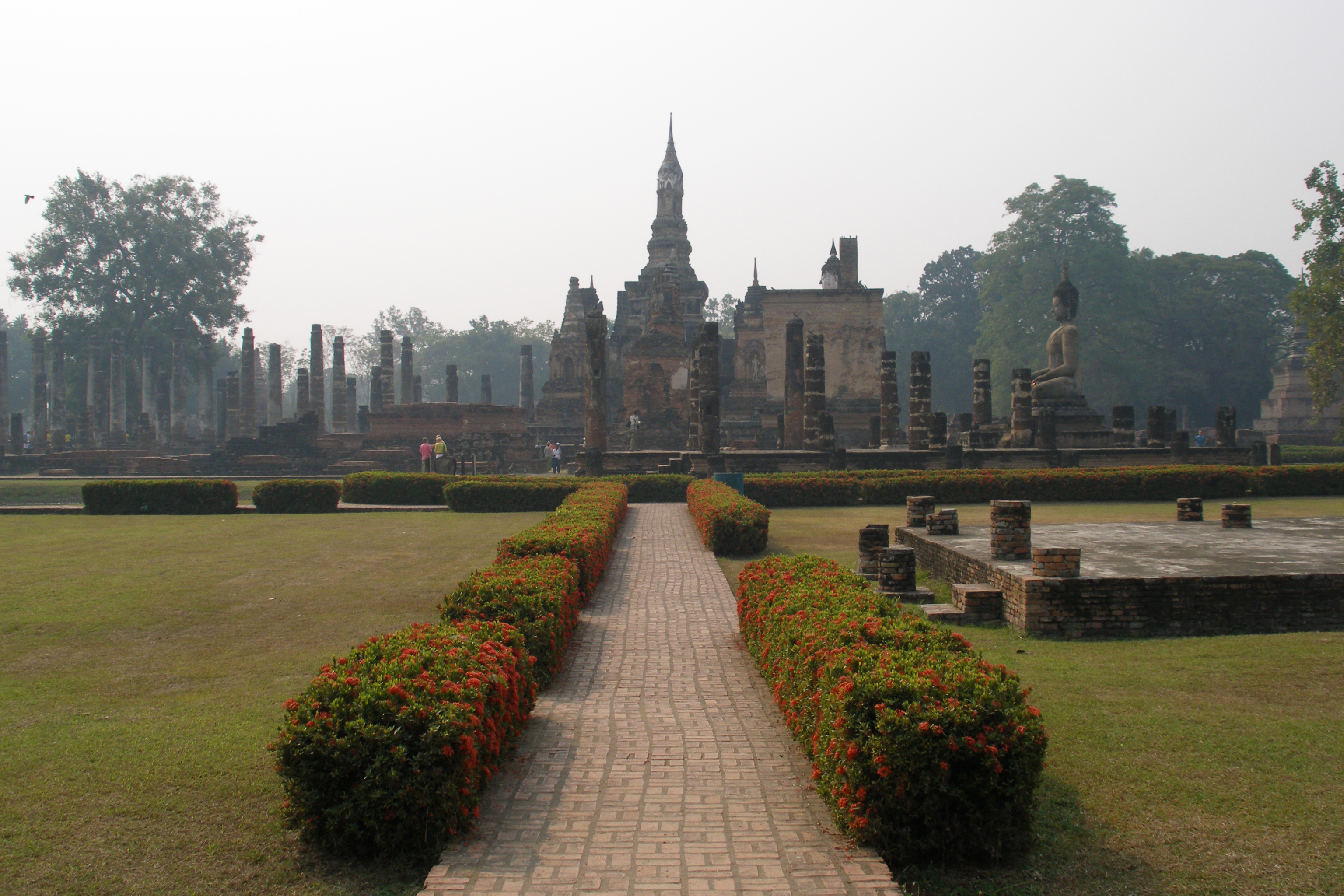
Wat Mahathat

Wat Mahathat or Mahathat Temple (Thai: วัดมหาธาตุ) is the most important and impressive temple in Sukhothai Historical Park. The temple's name translates to 'temple of the great relic'. The temple was founded by Sri Indraditya, between 1292 and 1347 as the main temple of the city as well as the Sukhothai Kingdom. The design is based on a mandala, representing the universe, with a principal stupa, built in 1345 to enshrine relics of the Buddha, surrounded by smaller stupas in eight directions. The main stupa has the shape of a lotus bud, which characterizes Sukhothai architectural arts. Its base is adorned with 168 stuccoed sculptings of Buddhist disciples walking with their hands clasped together in salutation. The eight smaller stupas, of which the four at the corners are in Mon Haripunchai - Lanna style and the four in between show Khmer influence. At both sides of the main stupa has two nine-metre-tall (30 ft) standing Buddha images called Phra Attharot (Thai: พระอัฏฐารส). The temple also includes an assembly hall (vihara), mandapa, ordination hall, and 200 subordinate stupas.

=== Noen Prasat ===
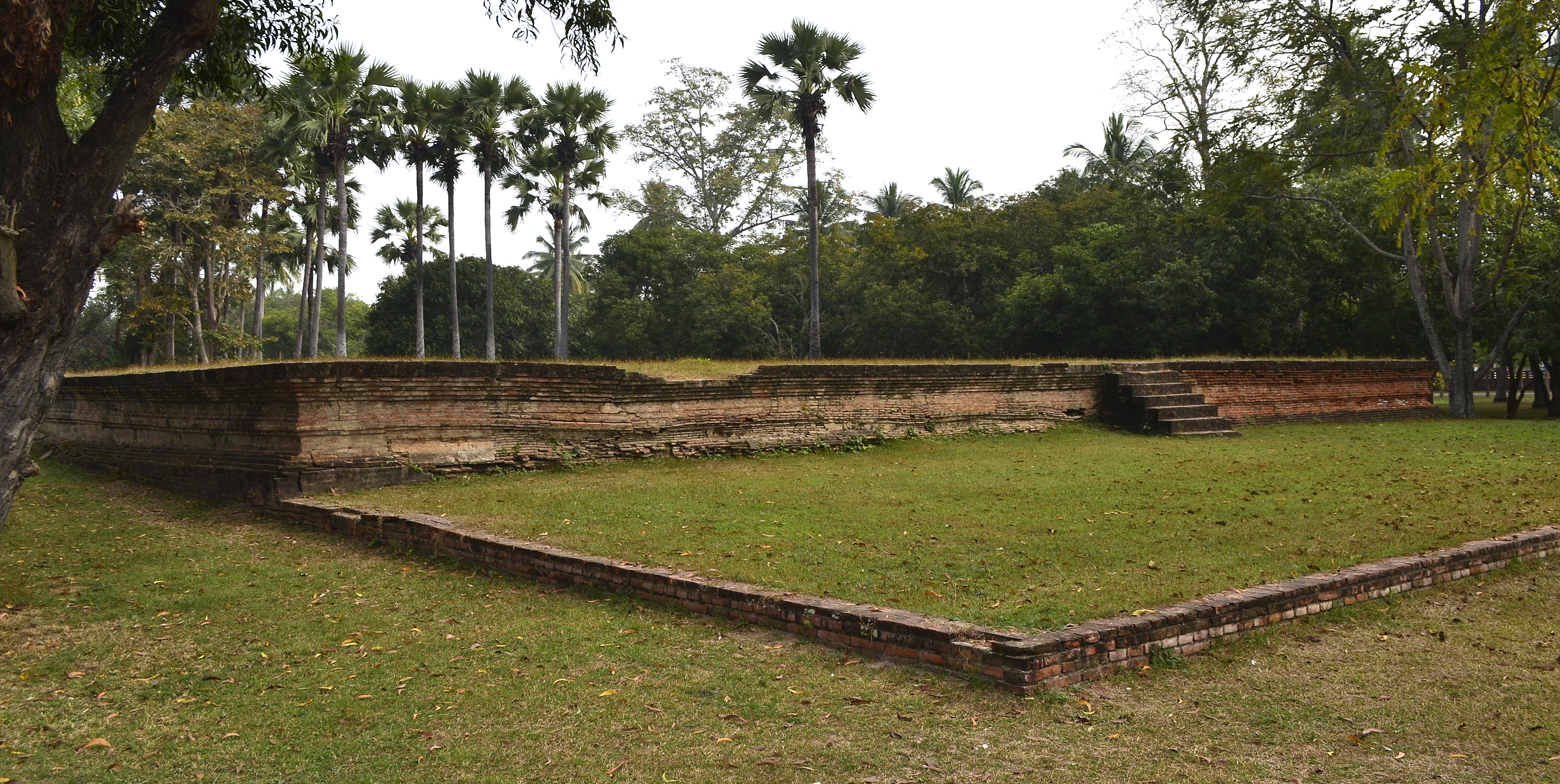
Noen Prasat

Noen Prasat or Palace Hill (Thai: เนินปราสาท) is the remains of the royal palace of the Kingdom of Sukhothai. The Noen Prasat was discovered in 1833 by Mongkut, who had made a pilgrimage to the north of Siam as a monk. The palace was built on a square base with the dimensions of 200 x 200 meters. Nearby were two small ponds where the archaeologists found the remains of terracotta pipes which probably been used to supply water from a city lake to the ponds. In the southwest, there are the remains of a 1.5-meter-high (4.9 ft) brick platform on which they found ashes and bones inside, so It can be assumed that it was the royal cremation place. The Ramkhamhaeng stele was discovered here by Mongkut. He also discovered the so-called "Manangasila Throne" (Thai: พระแท่นมนังคศิลาอาสน์), an approximately 1m x 2, 50m x 15 cm large slab of gray stone, which is decorated with lotus petals depiction. The Ramkhamhaeng Stele says that Ramkhamhaeng erected this stone throne in the sugar palm grove. Mongkut took these finds to Bangkok.

=== Ramkhamhaeng National Museum ===
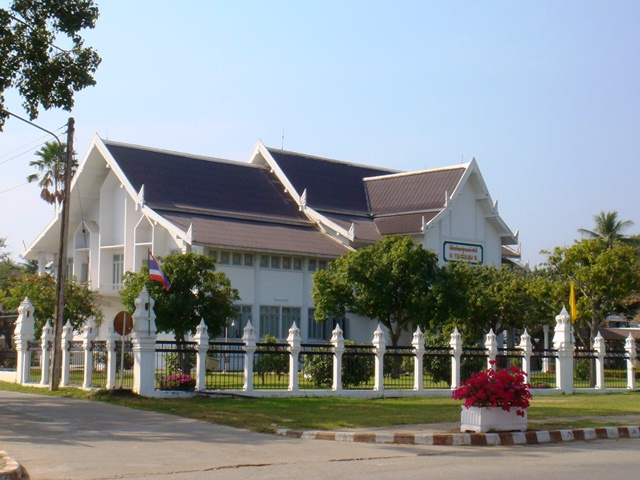
King Ramkhamhaeng National Museum

Ramkhamhaeng National Museum (Thai: พิพิธภัณฑสถานแห่งชาติรามคำแหง) is a branch of the National Museum of Thailand in the Sukhothai Historical Park. It was opened in 1964 by Thailand's King Bhumibol Adulyadej and Queen Sirikit. More than 2,000 artifacts were donated from Phra Ratchaprasitthikhun, the abbot of Ratchathani Temple. Locals also contributed to the collection by donating many historical objects. Most of the objects on display in the main museum building, come from Sukhothai, others were found in Si Satchanalai, Kamphaeng Phet, Phichit and Phetchabun. The collection including Buddha images and Hindu god sculptures from Wat Phra Phai Luang and Wat Mahathat, sculptures from the pre-Sukhothai period (about 13th century), Sukhothai artifacts from the 14th and 15th centuries, early Ayutthaya artifacts from about 1351 to 1488, porcelain from the Yuan, Ming and Qing dynasties, which was found during the excavations in Sukhothai and Si Satchanalai.

=== Wat Si Sawai ===
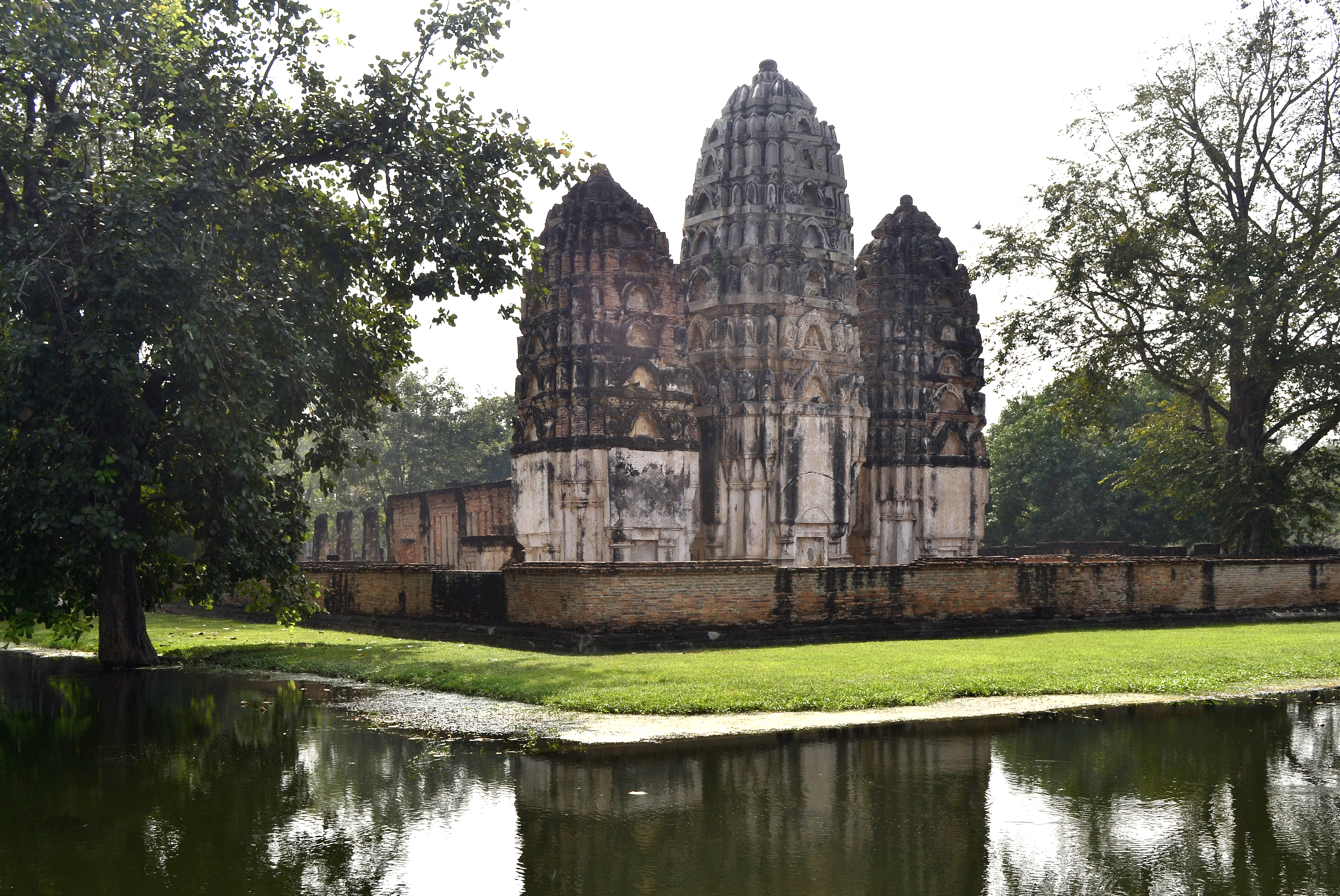
Wat Si Sawai

Wat Si Sawai or Si Sawai Temple (Thai: วัดศรีสวาย) is one of the oldest temples in Sukhothai. The temple was founded in the late-12th or early-13th century as a Hindu shrine for Vishnu and the place for the Thiruppavai ceremony before the liberation from Lawo and foundation of Sukhothai Kingdom. The temple has three well-preserved laterite prangs, representing the Hindu trinity, enclosed by a double rampart and a moat. The lower parts of prangs are apparently Khmer, while the upper have been expanded or renovated by Thais in brick and stucco. The central prang is held in Lawo or Hindu-style. Each prang contains a cella, possibly a podium for lingam and crypt. There are few remaining stucco works on the top of central prang. Later around the 14th century the temple was converted to the needs of the Buddhist faith: vihara were added to the south of the central prang. Numerous Chinese porcelains and Hindu god statues had been found in the area. One of artifacts is the Shiva statue discovered by Vajiravudh in 1907.

=== Wat Phra Phai Luang ===
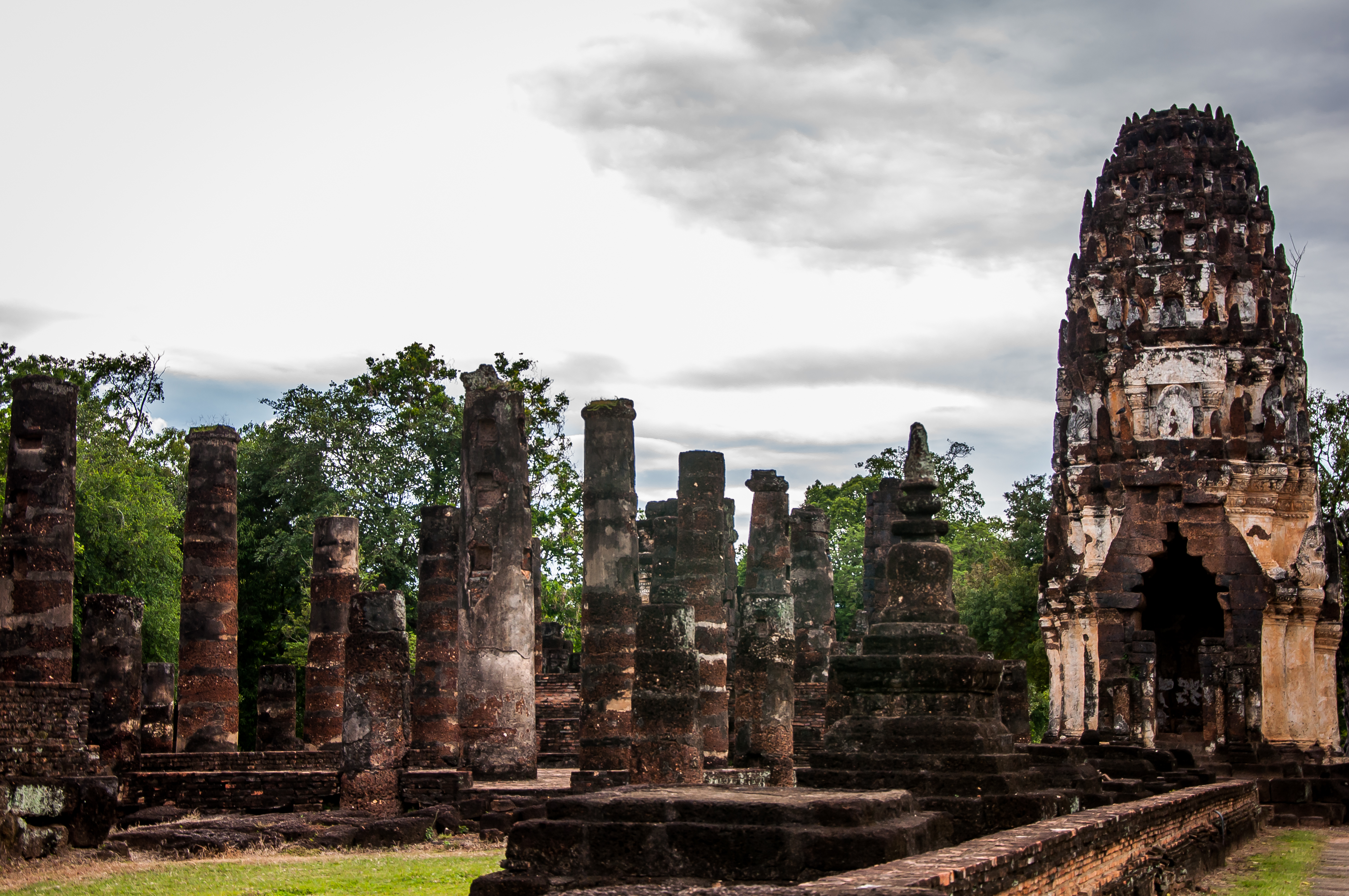
Wat Phra Phai Luang

Wat Phra Phai Luang (Thai: วัดพระพายหลวง) was the ritual center of Sukhothai and the biggest temple in the city area. Built in the late 12th century during the reign of Jayavarman VII when the city was still under control of Khmer-Lavo. After the liberation and the construction of Wat Mahathat, Wat Phra Phai Luang lost it main ceremonial role and become Theravada Buddhist temple. Similar to Wat Si Sawai, the temple has three laterite prang, but only one still preserved in good condition. Archaeologists suspect that the three prangs originally stood on a common laterite base. All three prangs were open to the east, with doors flanked by columns which carry a richly decorated tympanum depicting scenes from the life of Buddha. The doors on the other three sides were so-called "false doors". The tympanum The complex is enclosed by double moat. The outer moat is 600 meters length and is fed by the Lam-Pan River. In the north-west of prang complex are the remains of late 14th century vihara, mandapa and a small ordination hall with eight Bai Sema. The temple is an important place to study the transition of Khmer art to Thai art. Since in the 14th century the prang has been renovated by adding elaborate stucco in leaves and frames patterns which become the basic pattern of Thai art; however, most of stucco arts are now kept at Ramkhamhaeng National Museum.

=== Wat Sa Si ===
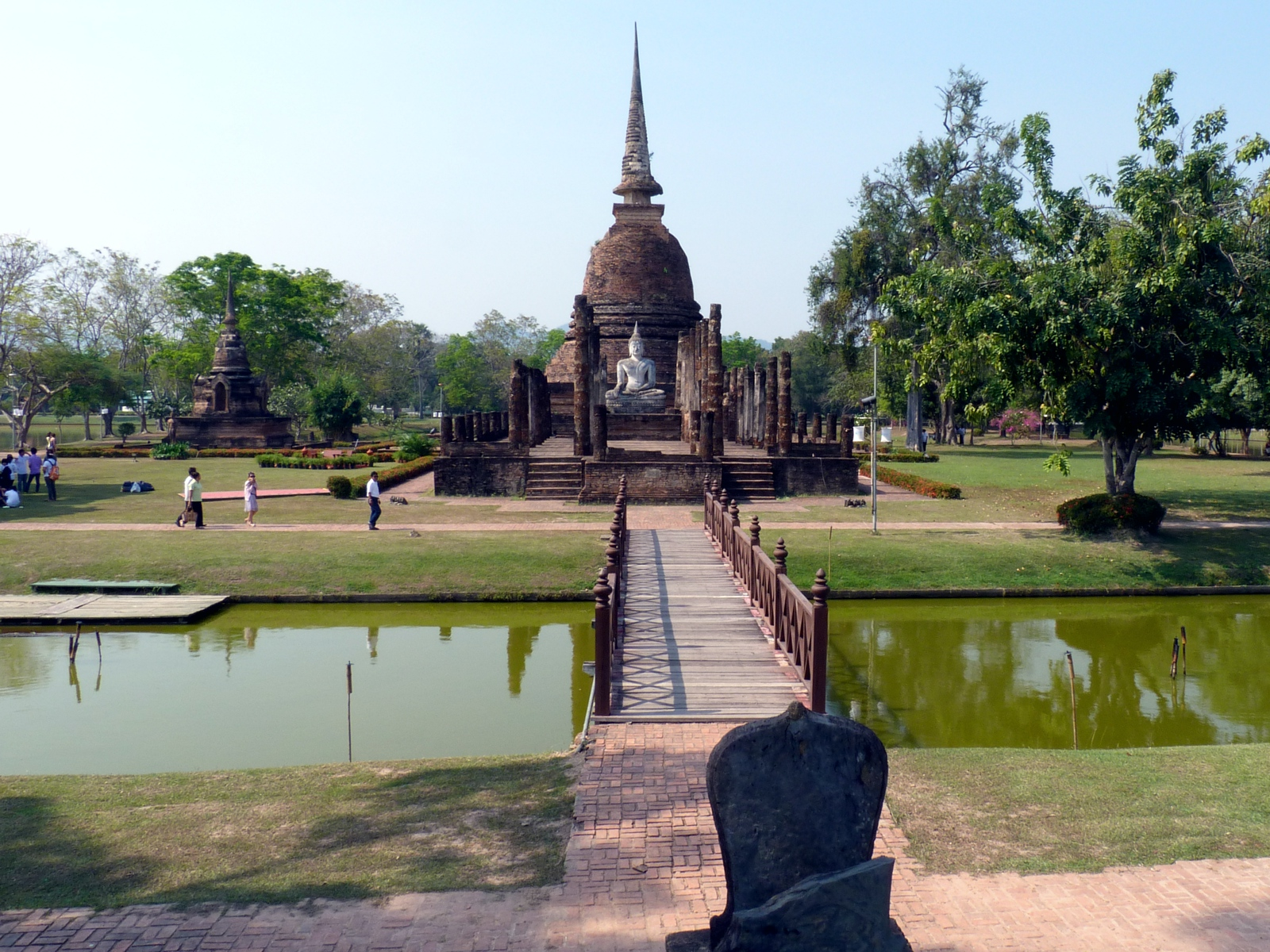
Wat Sa Si

Wat Sa Si (Thai: วัดสระศรี) is a small temple close to Ramkhamhaeng Monument. Wat Sa Si is beautifully situated in the midst of Traphang-Trakuan lake northwest of Wat Mahathat. Due to its location, the temple is one of the most beautiful place in Sukhothai. The temple has a Lanka styled stupa. The vihara of Wat Sa Si is situated on the east side of the stupa. Further east lies the ordination hall on its own little island. Also a large number of smaller stupas, of which today only the foundations are visible. Due to the similarities in structure and similar Bai Sema landmarks, it is believed today that Wat Sa Si were built at the same time of Wat Tra Kuan and Wat Chana Songkhram.

=== Wat Asokaram ===
Wat Asokārām (Thai: วัดอโศการาม) or Wat Salat Dai (Thai: วัดสลัดได) was founded in the time of Sukhothai Kingdom in the reign of Sailuethai in 1399. The name of Asokaram was forgotten for a long time. Locals called the temple "Wat Salat Dai" because the terrain of Euphorbia antiquorum (Thai: สลัดได) was overgrown in the temple area. In 1958 treasure hunters dug the stupa, they found a stone inscription. Today it is on display in the Ramkhamhaeng National Museum. The stone inscription informed that Wat Asokaram was found in 1399 by the widow of Luethai, the Queen Mother, the "Satṃtec brah Rājadebī Sri Cuḷālakṣana Arrgarājamahesī Debadhòranī Tilakaratana". She was the daughter of Lithai. By her husband, Luethai they had two sons, Sailuethai, and Asoka. It is not clear why she named the temple Asokaram. One possible reason is to be a monument for her son, Asoka, other reason might have been even the name of an ancestor or even the Indian ruler Asoka. Another possibility is the name refers to "Asoka trees" Saraca asoca that are common on the temple grounds. The temple attractions are the large 5-stage step pyramid stupa, a vihara, a mandapa, and foundations of smaller pagodas.

=== Wat Tra Kuan ===
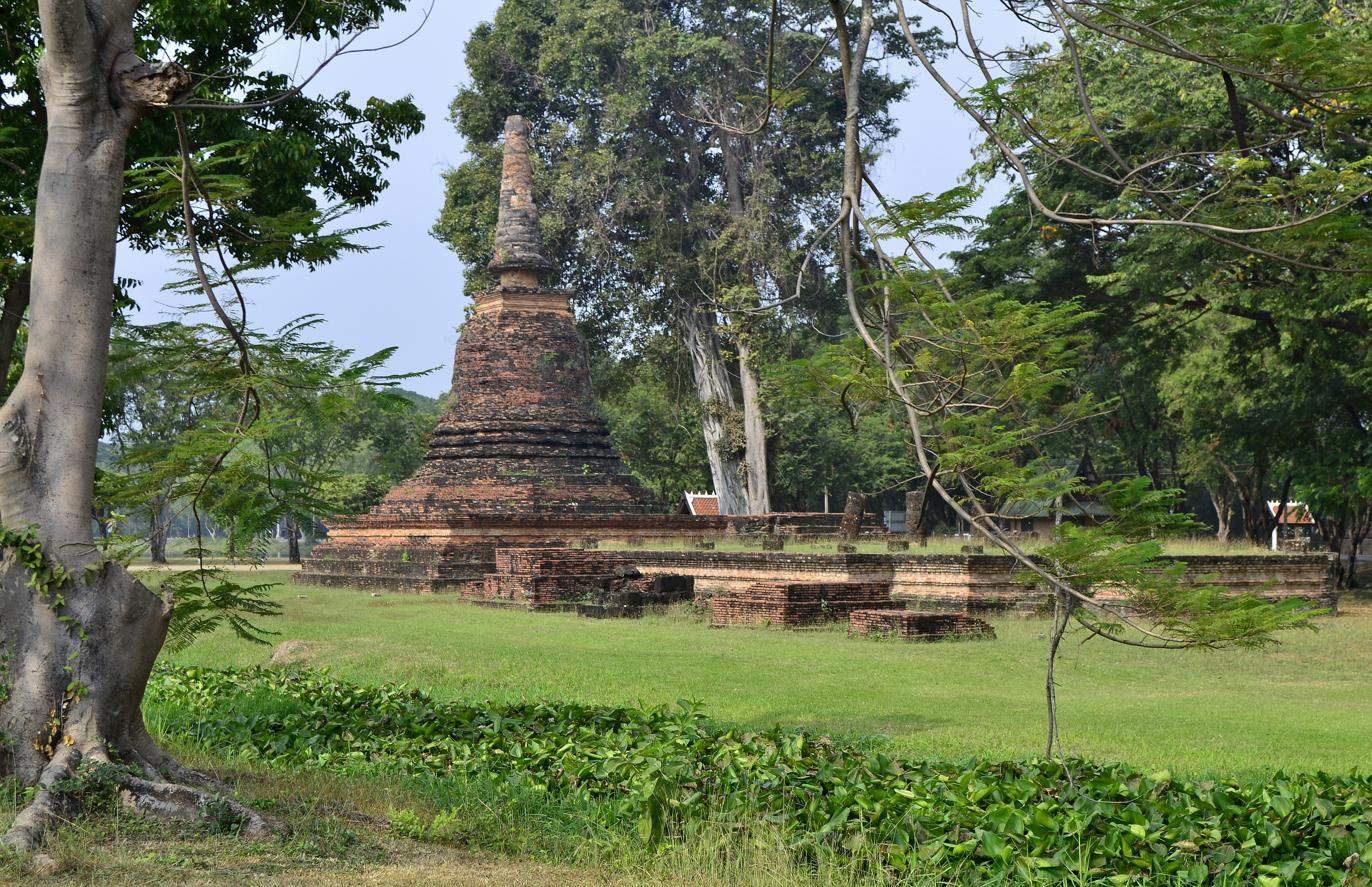
Wat Tra Kuan

Wat Tra Kuan (Thai: วัดตระกวน) is a small temple close to Ramkhamhaeng Monument north of Wat Mahathat. The original name of the temple is not Thai, according to a theory of Vajiravudh Tra Kuan is a Khmer term for a plant that is morning glory, a medicinal plant is used in traditional Asian medicine. Wat Tra Kuan was founded in the time of the Kingdom of Sukhothai, probably the temple was finished at the beginning of the 15th century. A majestic stupa in Lanka styled is in the west of the site. Its square base has three tier layers. East of stupa are the ruins of an ordination hall with a small terrace, six columns and a staircase on the eastern side. This layout differs from the standard Sukhothai temple, usually east of stupa should be vihara. Simple Bai Sema and the foundations of several smaller stupas are arranged around the ordination hall. In 1960s Archaeologists found a bronze Buddha image on the premises. This unique Buddha image, is now kept in the Ramkhamhaeng National Museum, resembles Lanna and Lanka styles with Sukhothai influence, thus the art historian called this style "Wat Tra Kuan style".

=== Wat Chana Songkhram ===
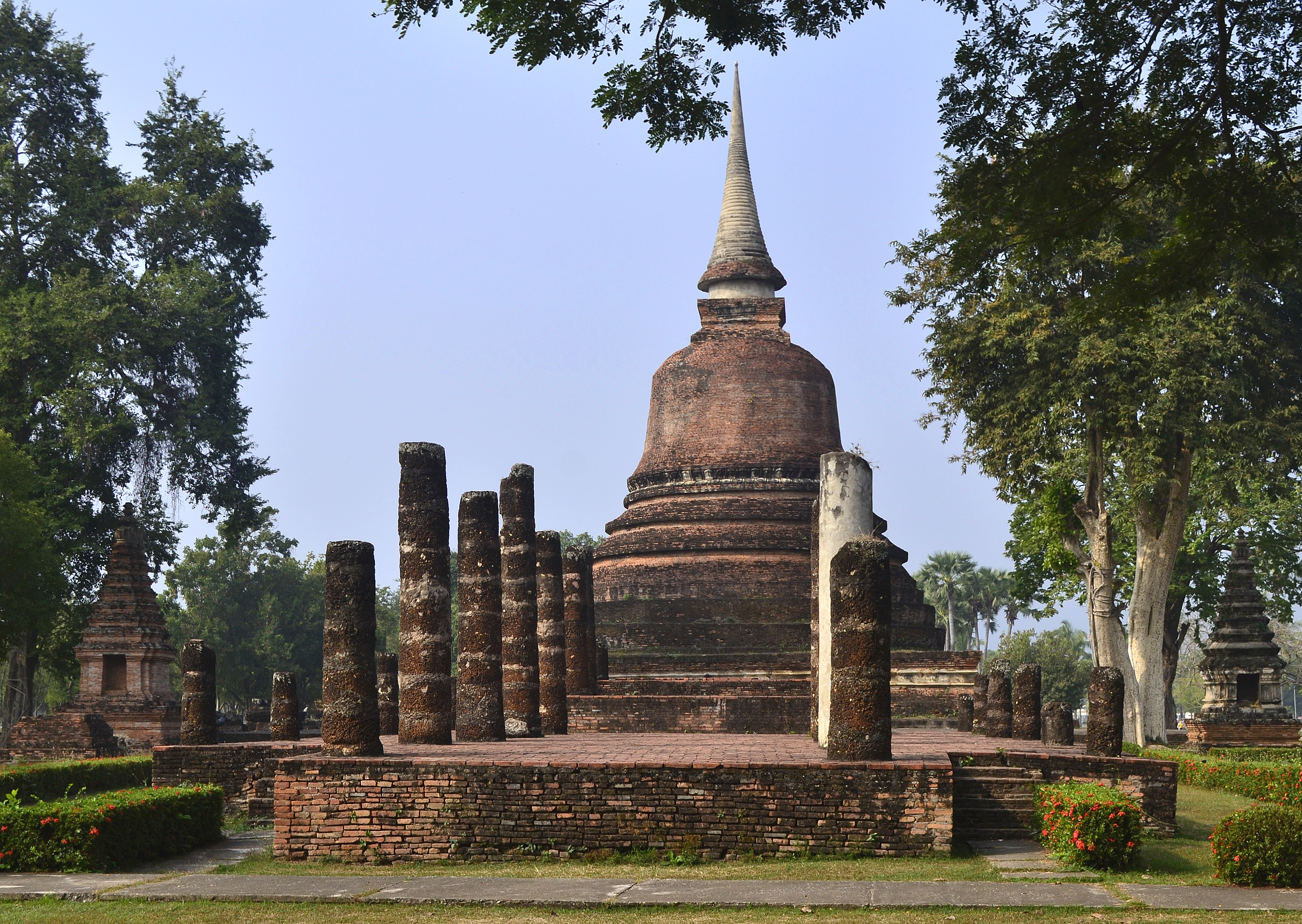
Wat Chana Songkhram

Wat Chana Songkhram (Thai: วัดชนะสงคราม) is a small temple close to Ramkhamhaeng Monument north of Wat Mahathat in the same area with Wat Sa Si and Wat Tra Kuan. The temple was built in the time of the Sukhothai Kingdom. Today only ruins of the former layout can be seen. The largest stupa is an example of the Lanka - Sukhothai style with bell shaped. Buildings are arranged around the number of smaller stupas. Located on the east side of stupa have Ayutthaya period building. An ordination hall is located on the eastern border of the temple.

=== Wat Pa Mamuang ===
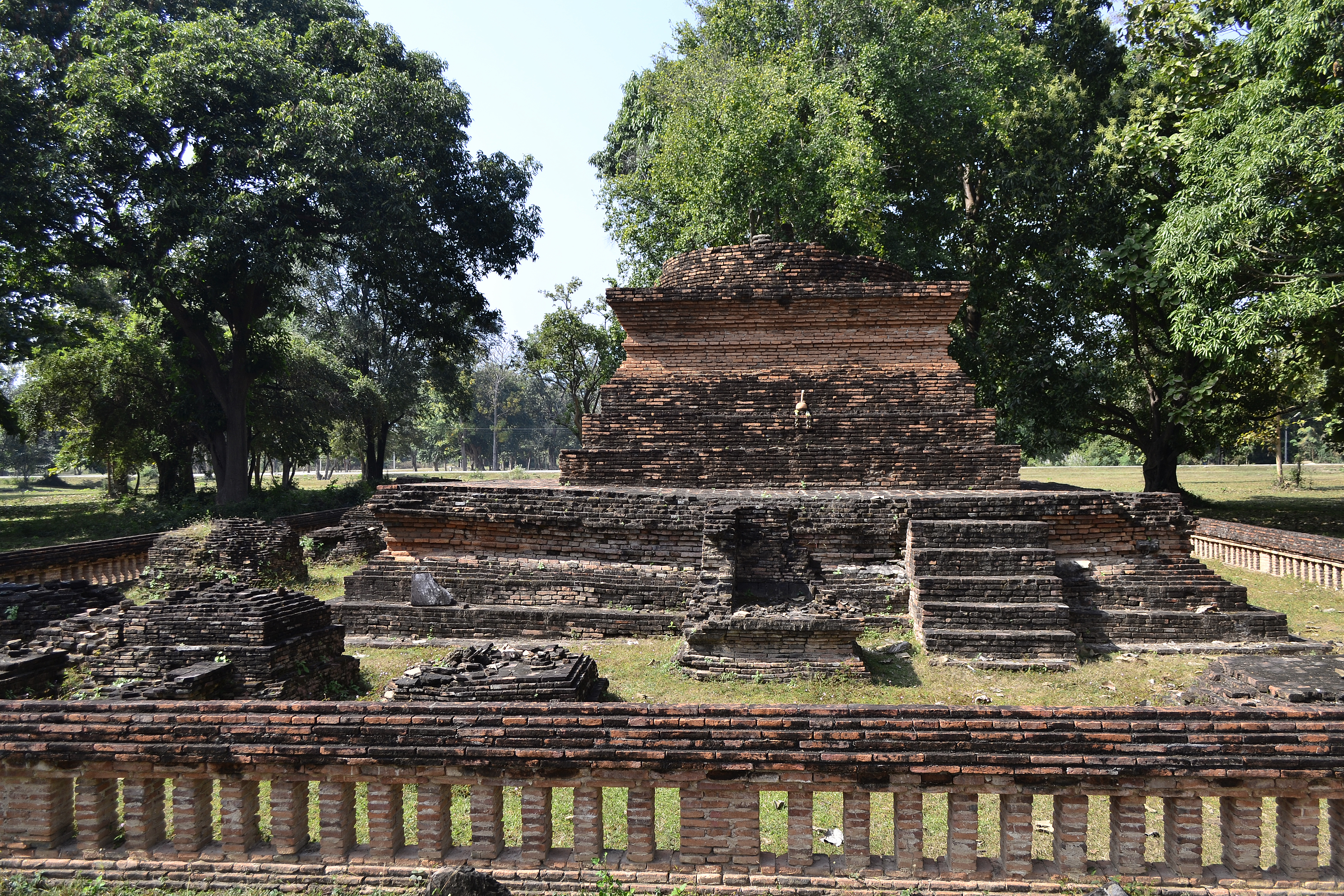
Wat Pa Mamuang

Wat Pa Mamuang or Pa Mamuang Temple (Thai: วัดป่ามะม่วง) means the mango forest monastery and was a temple of the prestigious forest monks in which the Sangharaja resided. According to legend, Ramkhamhaeng planted a mango grove in front of the city. Here Luethai founded a royal temple, Wat Pa Mamuang was called. He built a Mandapa for the "Devalayamahaksetra", a Brahmin shrine. Although Sukhothai kings were devoted Buddhists, the royal Brahmin ceremonies was still practiced in the court. The excavations found in the 20th century that Lithai made two larger than life bronze statues of Shiva and Vishnu. The statues are now on display in the National Museum in Bangkok. In 1341 when Sukhothai adopted Ceylon Theravada Buddhism or Lankavamsa (นิกายลังกาวงศ์), Luethai invited a monk from Ceylon, Sumana Thera, to Sukhothai and resided in this temple. In 1361 Lithai appointed the famous monk Mahasamī to be Sangharaja, Mahasami had also acquired his profound knowledge of the Tipitaka during long studies in Ceylon. He renovated and enlarged the temple. On 23 November 1361 Lithai had ordained to become the monk, thus the first Siamese king who spent time in the Buddhist monastic life. A tradition which continue until present day.

=== Wat Chang Lom ===
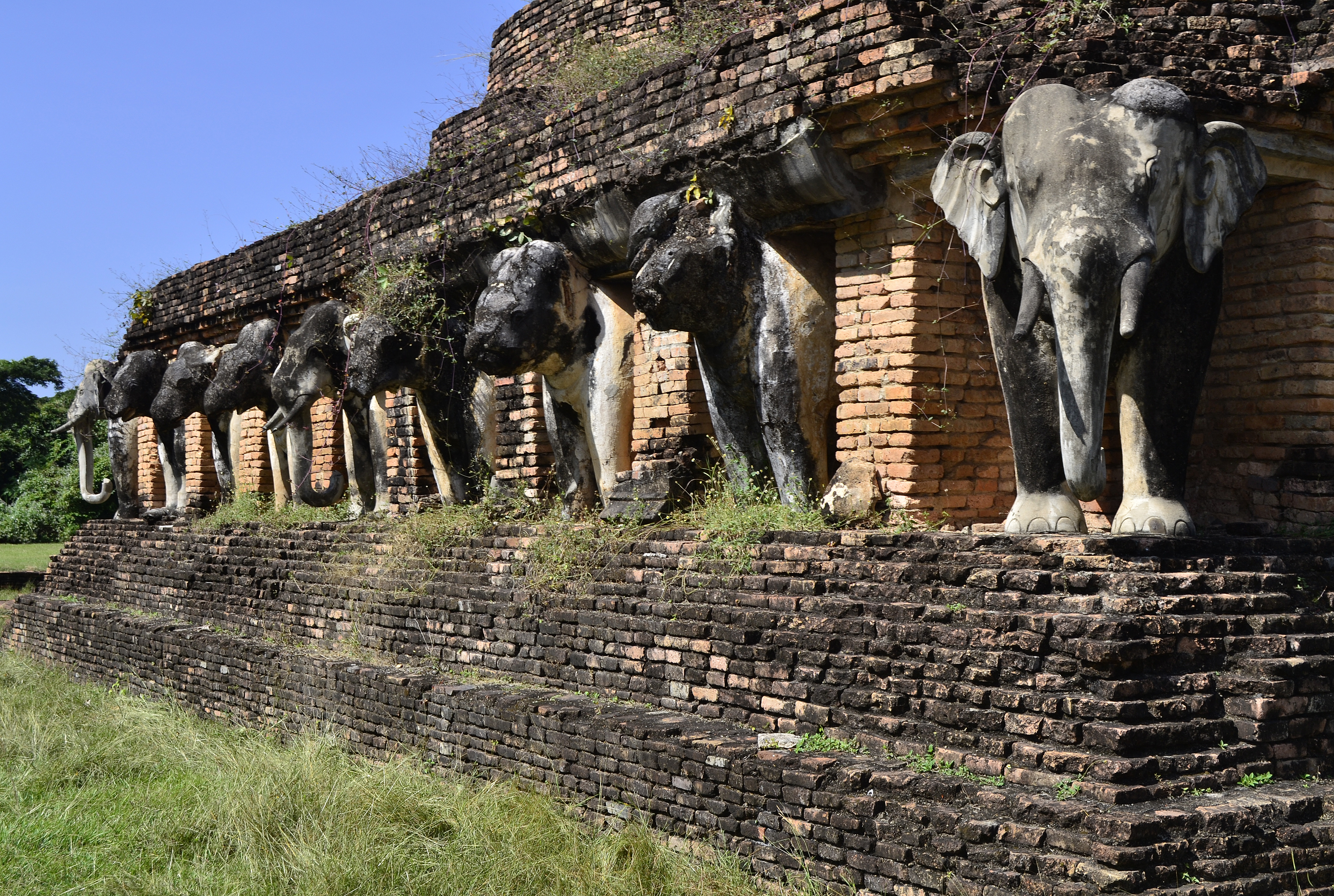
Wat Chang Lom

Wat Chang Lom (Thai: วัดช้างล้อม) is a temple complex consist of a large stupa in Lanka style with the remains of a gallery, the ruins of a vihara and an ordination hall, surrounded by moat. Numerous small stupas, of many is only the foundation remain, are scattered around the grounds. The large bell-shaped stupa stands on a square brick base with about 18 meters on each side. 32 elephant sculptures stand around the base. Each elephant seems to be on a small brick niche, only the front part of the elephant is visible. A square portico with brick foundation and remains of laterite pillars surrounding the stupa area at some distance. East of the Stupa are the ruins of a vihara with a Buddha image and round and square laterite pillars.

=== Wat Chang Rop ===
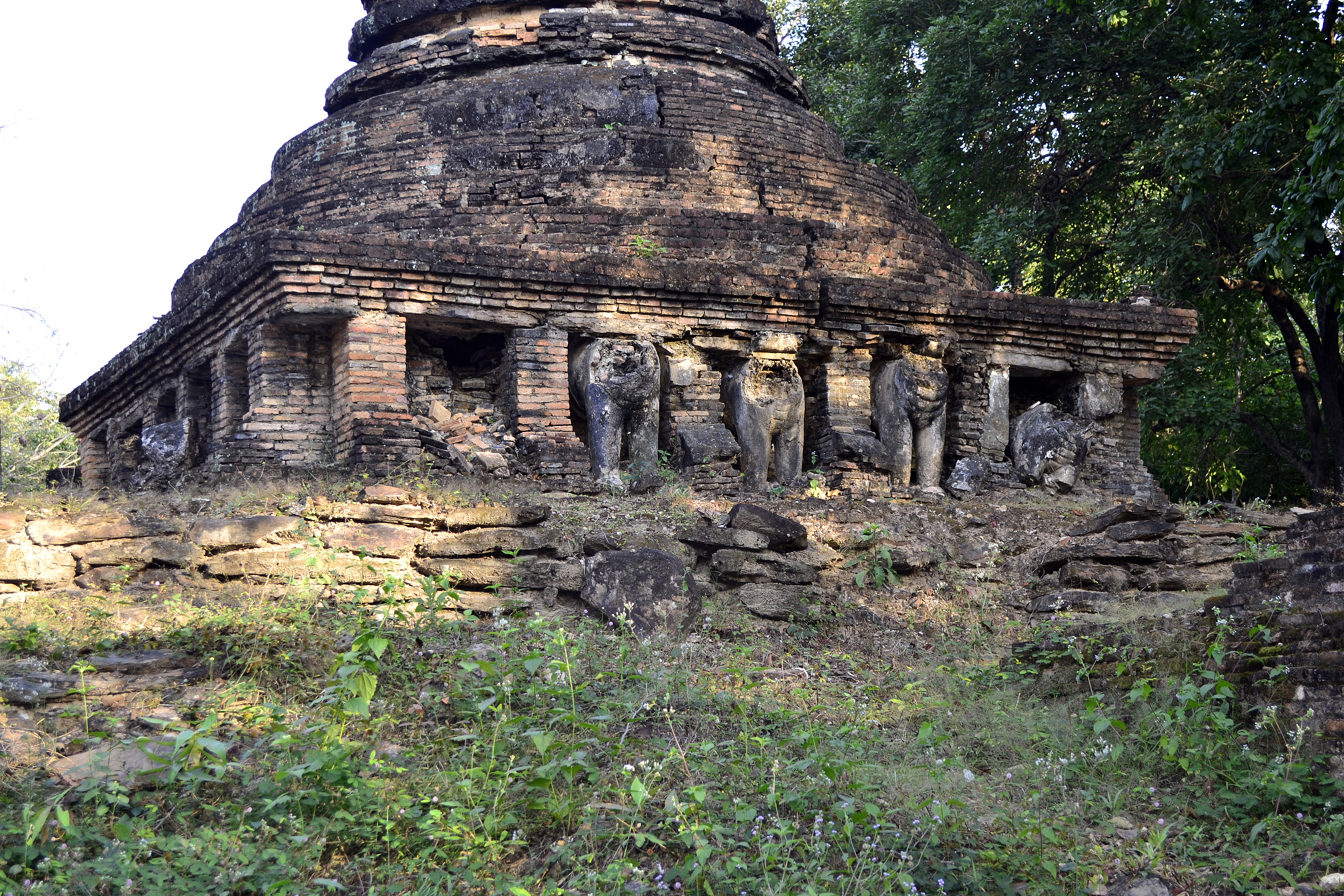
Wat Chang Rop

Wat Chang Rop (also "Rob") (Thai: วัดช้างรอบ) lies two kilometers west of Sukhothai in the wooded hills as a forest temple. In Sukhothai period the Buddhist monks could be divided according to their way of life in two groups. The first group preferred to live in monasteries within the city and focus on Tripitaka study, therefore this group called "city monks" or Kamawasi (Thai: คามวาสี). The other group preferring to practice meditation and often lived in monasteries outside the city in quiet forest areas, therefore "forest monks" or Aranyawasi (Thai: อรัญญวาสี). Wat Chang Rop was one of the temples for forest monks during that time. The main structure of the temple is a bell-shaped stupa standing on a large square base. There are niches with 24 elephants on the four sides of the stupa. This stupa is probably the first in Sukhothai having the Lanka style. In front of the stupa are the remains of a small vihara with laterite pillars.

=== Wat Si Chum ===
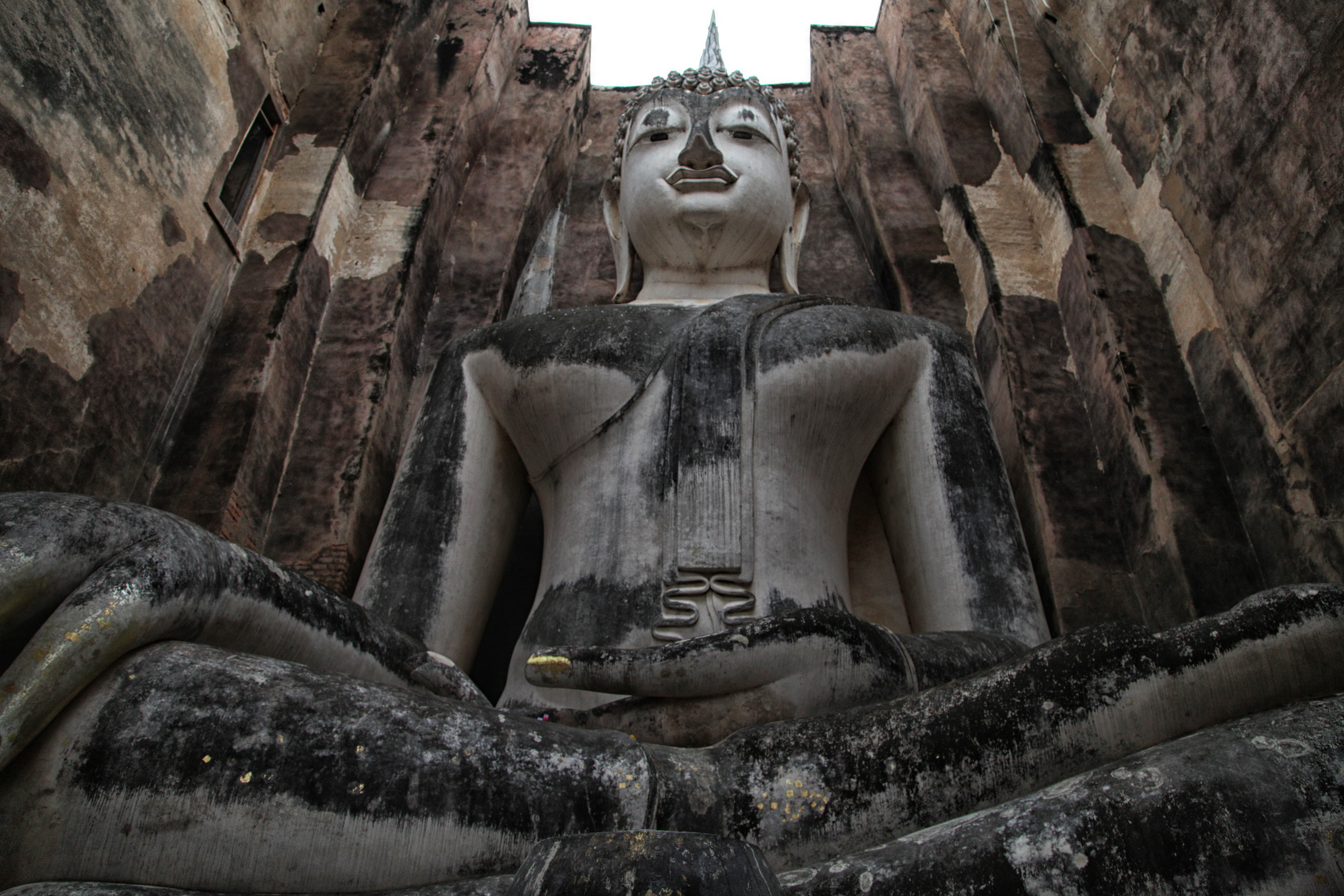
Wat Si Chum

Wat Si Chum (Thai: วัดศรีชุม) has a massive mandapa in the middle of the complex which was built in the late 14th century by King Maha Thammaracha II. Inside the mandapa, there is a huge 11 meters wide and 15 meters high seated Buddha image called "Phra Achana", which was mentioned in Ramkhamhaeng stele. The Mandapa has a square base of 32 meters on each side and 15 meters high, and its walls are three feet thick. In the south wall there is a narrow staircase passage which can be used to reach the roof. In this passage more than 50 slates were discovered on which images from the life of Buddha (Jataka) are engraved. These slates are the oldest surviving examples of Thai art of drawing. East of mandapa are the ruins of vihara with column fragments and three Buddha image pedestals. North of the Mandapa are the ruins of another small vihara and another smaller mandapa with a Buddha image. The entire complex is surrounded by a moat. There is a legend that to boost morale of the ancient soldiers and people, the kings went through the hidden passageway and address the people through a hole, making them believed the voice they were hearing was actually the Buddha's.

=== Wat Saphan Hin ===
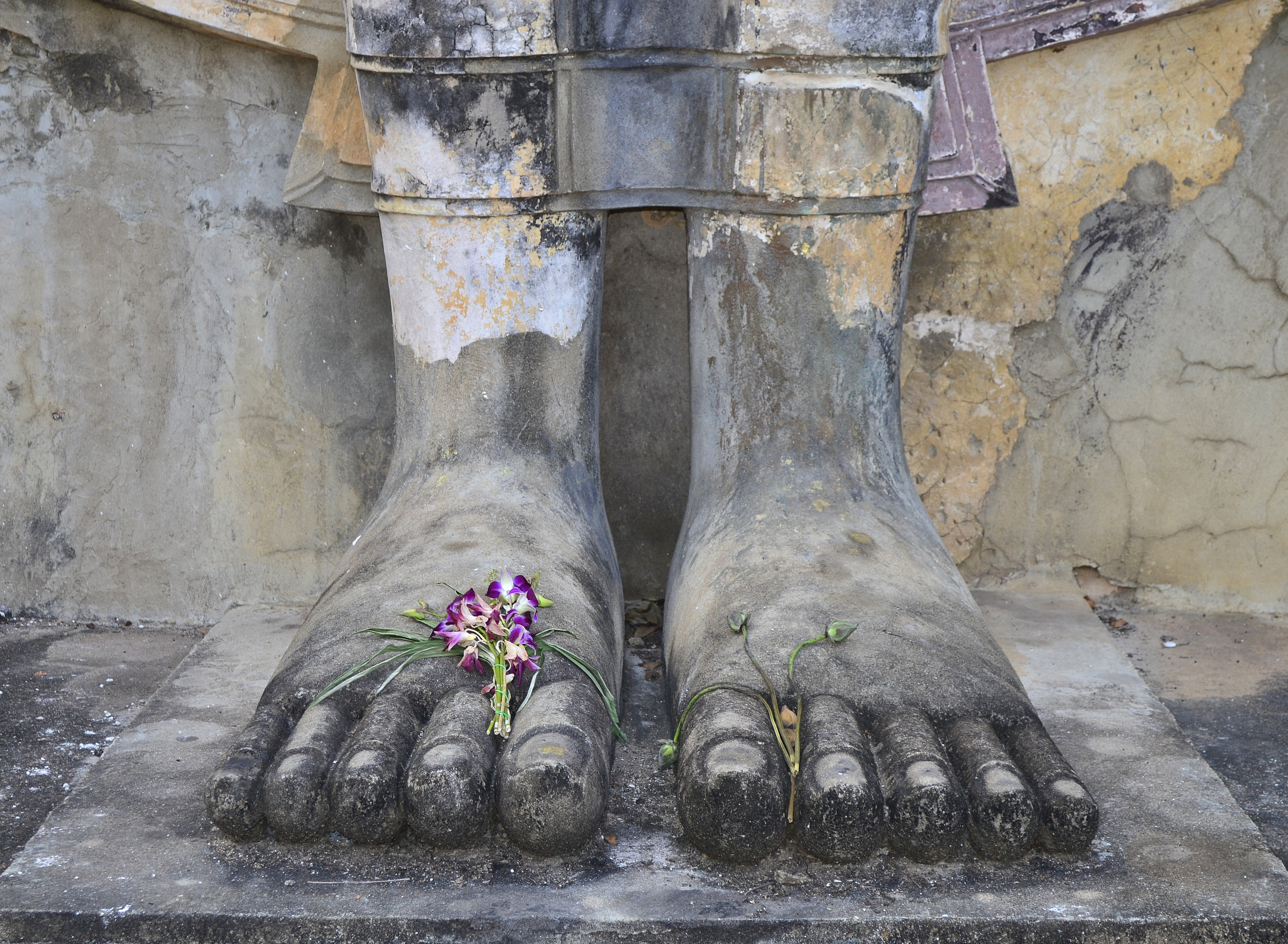
Wat Saphan Hin

Wat Saphan Hin (Thai: วัดสะพานหิน) or Wat Taphan Hin (Thai: วัดตะพานหิน) is located on the 200 metres hill above the plain of Sukhothai. The name of the temple means Stone Bridge Monastery, since there is a slate pathway and staircase in front of the temple complex. In various stone inscriptions found in Sukhothai, this temple was also called "Wat Aranyik", and since Wat Saphan Hin and Wat Aranyik are only about 500 meters away from each other, so perhaps originally a single temple. When Ramkhamhaeng invited a learned monk from the distant Nakhon Si Thammarat in the south of present-day Thailand to become Sangharaja of Sukhothai, he built Wat Saphan Hin with beautiful vihara for Sangharaja to reside. The temple also has a large 12.5 meters tall standing Buddha image named "Phra Attharot". Another large Buddha image was found in the mid-20th century. The image has features of Dvaravati style, but more likely made in the 8th century in the kingdom of Srivijaya.

=== Wat Aranyik ===
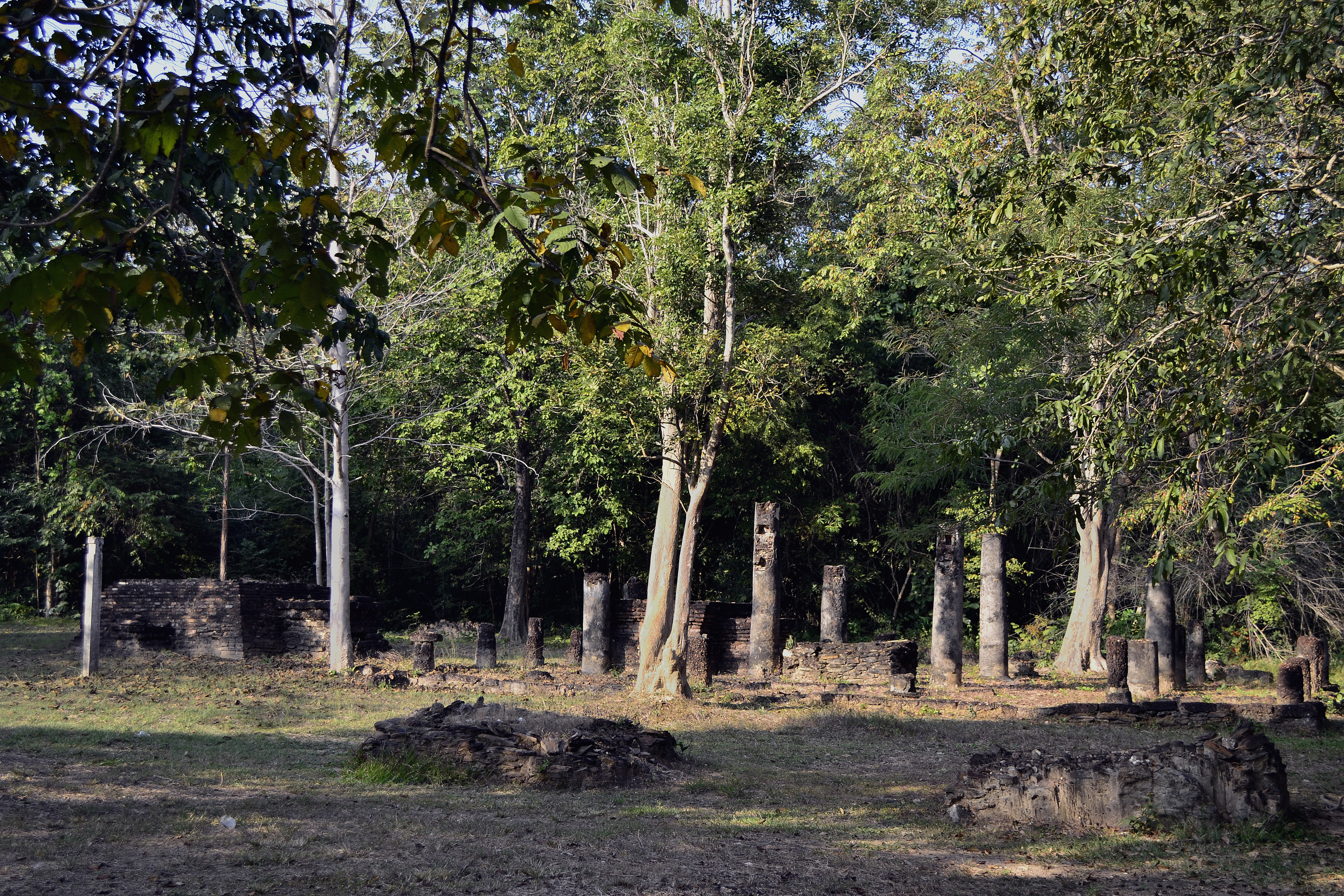
Wat Aranyik

Wat Aranyik (Thai: วัดอรัญญิก) was one of the first temple built by Tai in and around Sukhothai. The architectural remains indicate that the temple was built at beginning of the 13th century. Although the typical Khmer stonework are present everywhere. The buildings are arranged rather scattered over a relatively extensive grounds. There is a small Khmer style ordination hall on a high stone pedestal with eight Bai sema on the separate stone pedestals. Scattered on the wooded grounds are the remains of many unidentifiable stone structures possibly stupa or vihara. Normally monk residence were built from non-durable materials and are therefore no longer discernible. However, at Wat Aranyik there are some small cells made of stone, which could be perhaps once been monk residence.

=== Wat Chedi Ngam ===
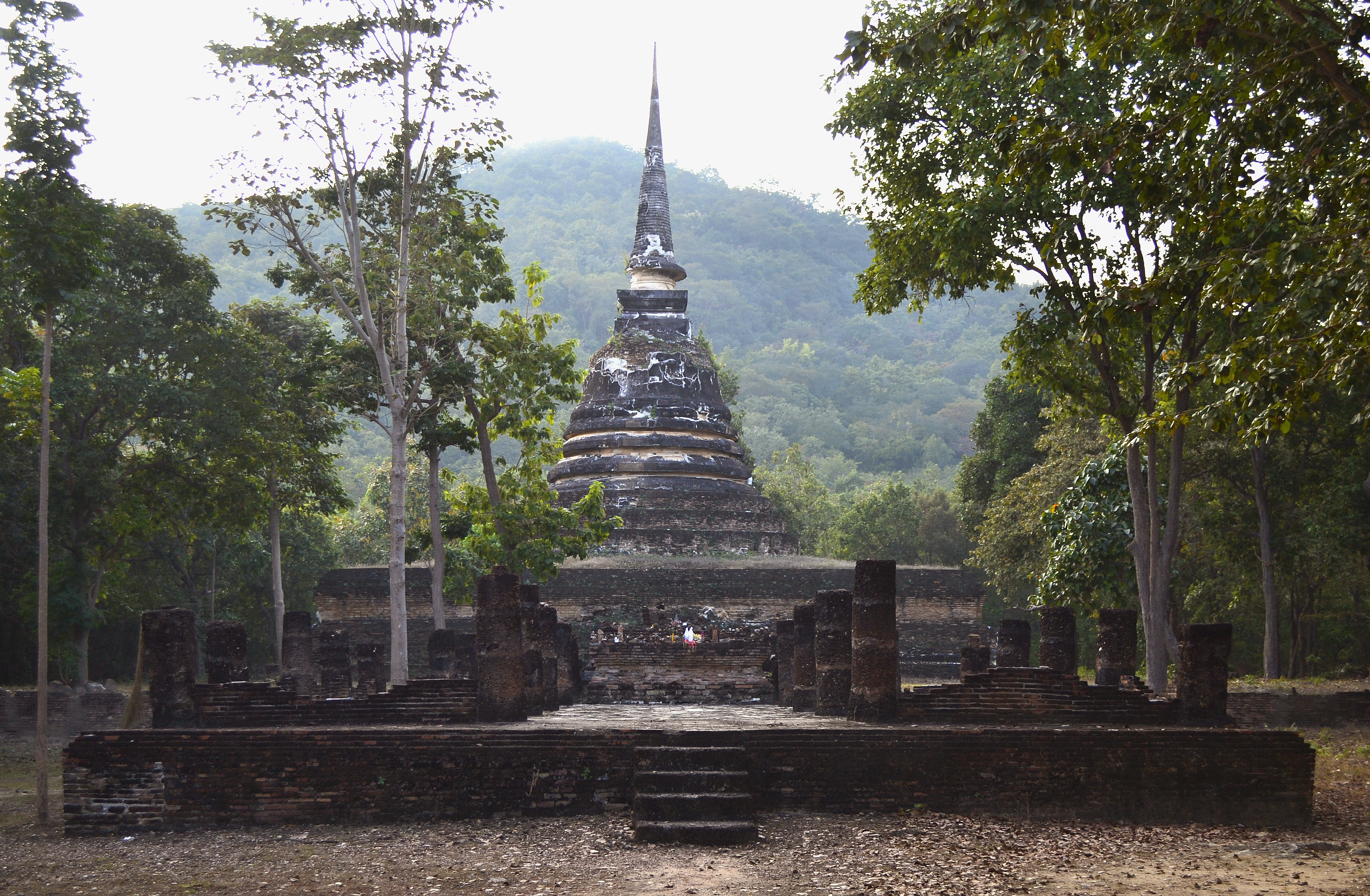
Wat Chedi Ngam

Wat Chedi Ngam (Thai: วัดเจดีย์งาม) is a temple located about 2.5 kilometers west of the western city wall. The main building of Wat Chedi Ngam are aligned in east–west direction. There is a paved road leads up to the temple. The bell-shaped stupa is in Sri Lanka style which is visible from afar. Similar to Wat Chang Rop, the stupa stands on a large, square base of 24 meters on each side. On each side there is a niche which once contained a statue of Buddha. There is a slate tiles floor vihara in the east but few remains are still visible. In the north there are some structures of brick and stone that might once were monk residence. In the vicinity there is a fountain.

=== Wat Chedi Si Hong ===
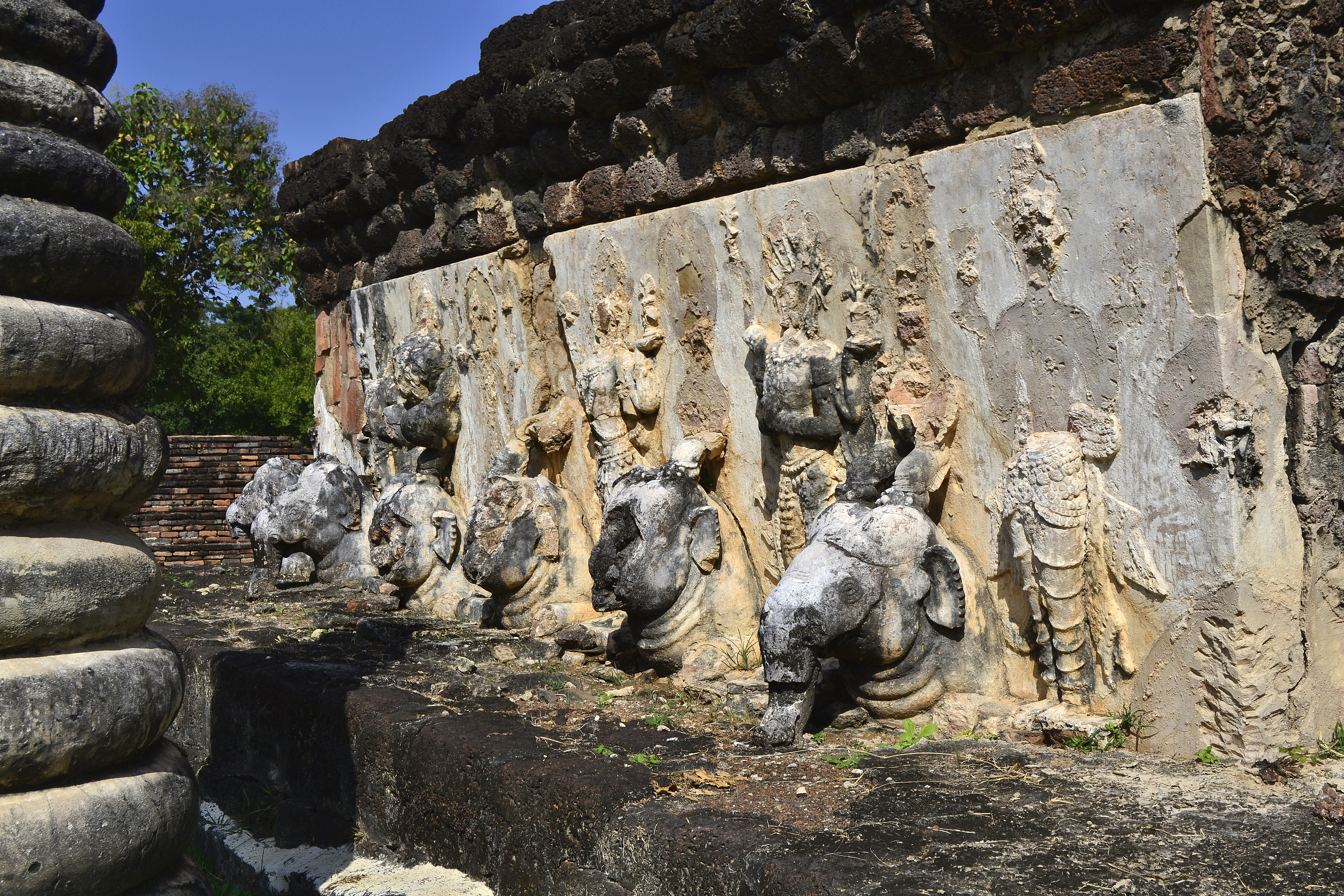
Wat Chedi Si Hong

Wat Chedi Si Hong (Thai: วัดเจดีย์สี่ห้อง) located about two kilometers south of the southern city gate, opposite Wat Chetuphon. The temple was built in the reign of Lithai in the late 14th century. Excavations by the Fine Arts Department in 1963 and from 1970 to 1971, the temple were restored. There is a large, bell-shaped stupa on a high, square base. Around the base of stupa are the remains of unique stucco reliefs depicting many-armed deities with flower vases, their clothing and jewelry attest to the fashion in the time of Sukhothai Kingdom. Between the deities, there are lions and elephants. The vihara is 19 × 25 meters and has rounded laterite pillars and a small porch to the east. The legs of a huge seated Buddha statue can be seen at the western brick wall. A small ordination hall with remains of the boundary stones (Bai Sema) is located in the north of the temple. The base of several smaller stupas are scattered around the grounds. More stucco reliefs, which were found in the temple, are now in the Ramkhamhaeng National Museum.

=== Wat Chetuphon ===
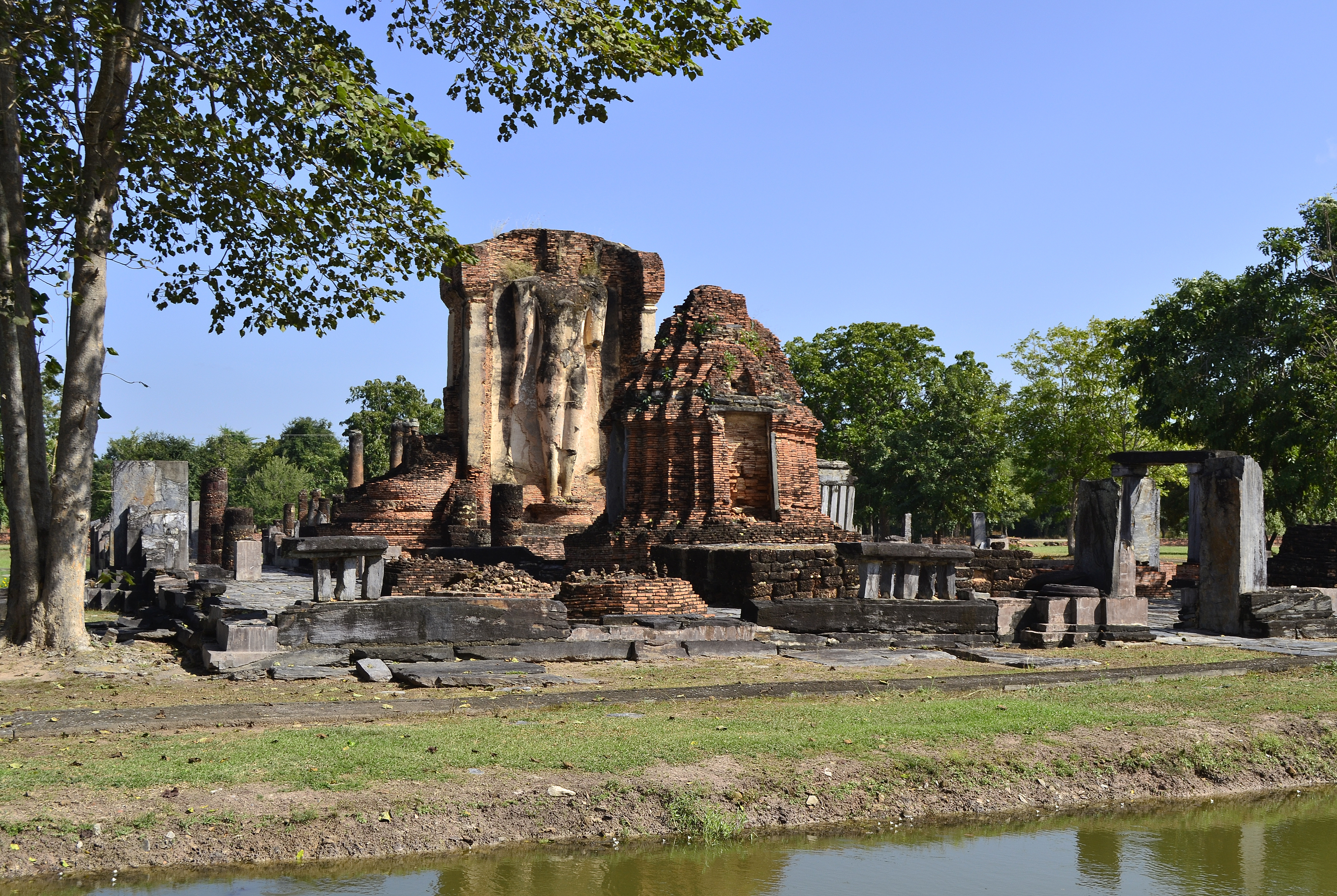
Wat Chetuphon

Wat Chetuphon (Thai: วัดเชตุพล) is a temple located about two kilometers south of the southern city wall, which surrounds the historic city of Sukhothai. According to Wat Sorasak Inscription, the temple have been built before 1412 and was restored in 1970–1972 by the Fine Arts Department. A moat and a brick wall surround this temple and in the center stands a large brick mandapa, at the four outer sides they are 14th or early 15th century stucco Buddha sculptures with different postures. The eastern side depicts a walking Buddha, the northern one is sitting, the western one is standing, and the southern one is a reclining Buddha. The two large statues in the west and in the east are called "Phra Attharot". Another special feature of this temple is the use of slate in the galleries around the mandapa and the door frame. To the west, there is a slightly smaller mandapa with a Buddha image, which is called by the locals "Phra Sri Ariya" (Maitreya). Traces of black floral patterns can be identified on the walls. There is a vihara, of which only the foundations and a few fragments of columns can be seen today. About 100 meters south of the moat is an ordination hall on a slightly elevated mound and has two sets of Bai Sema.

=== Wat Traphang Ngoen ===
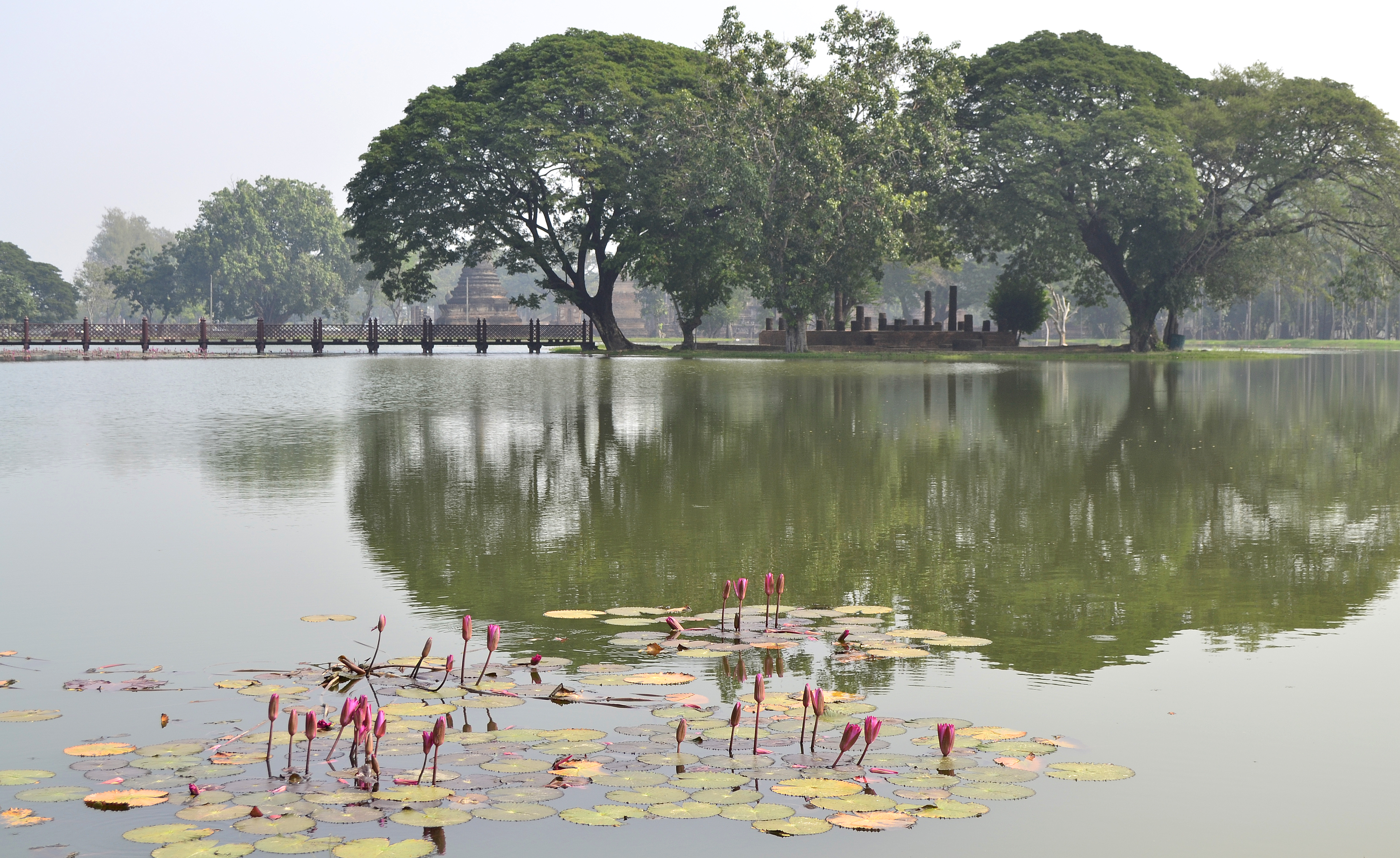
Wat Traphang Ngoen

Wat Traphang Ngoen (Thai: วัดตระพังเงิน) means silver lake monastery. The temple was probably built in the 14th century, around the same time with Wat Mahathat. Wat Traphang Ngoen is oriented so that it is illuminated by both rising and setting sun. The main structures of the temple are a central stupa, the ruins of a vihara, a large Buddha image on a pedestal in the west and an ordination hall on an island in the middle of an artificial lake, "Traphang Ngoen" (Silver Lake). The stupa is typical 10 meters Sukhothai style in the form of a closed lotus flower stands on a square laterite base, followed by five smaller and smaller levels of brick with a plain stucco, standing Buddha image in niches in the four cardinal directions. An ordination hall lies to the east of the main stupa on a small island in the middle of the lake. In the Sukhothai time, the ordination hall was separated by a water area from the rest of the temple complex to symbolize purity. Today only foundation bricks, some fragments of columns and a pedestal on which probably used to be a Buddha image are visible.

=== Wat Traphang Thong ===
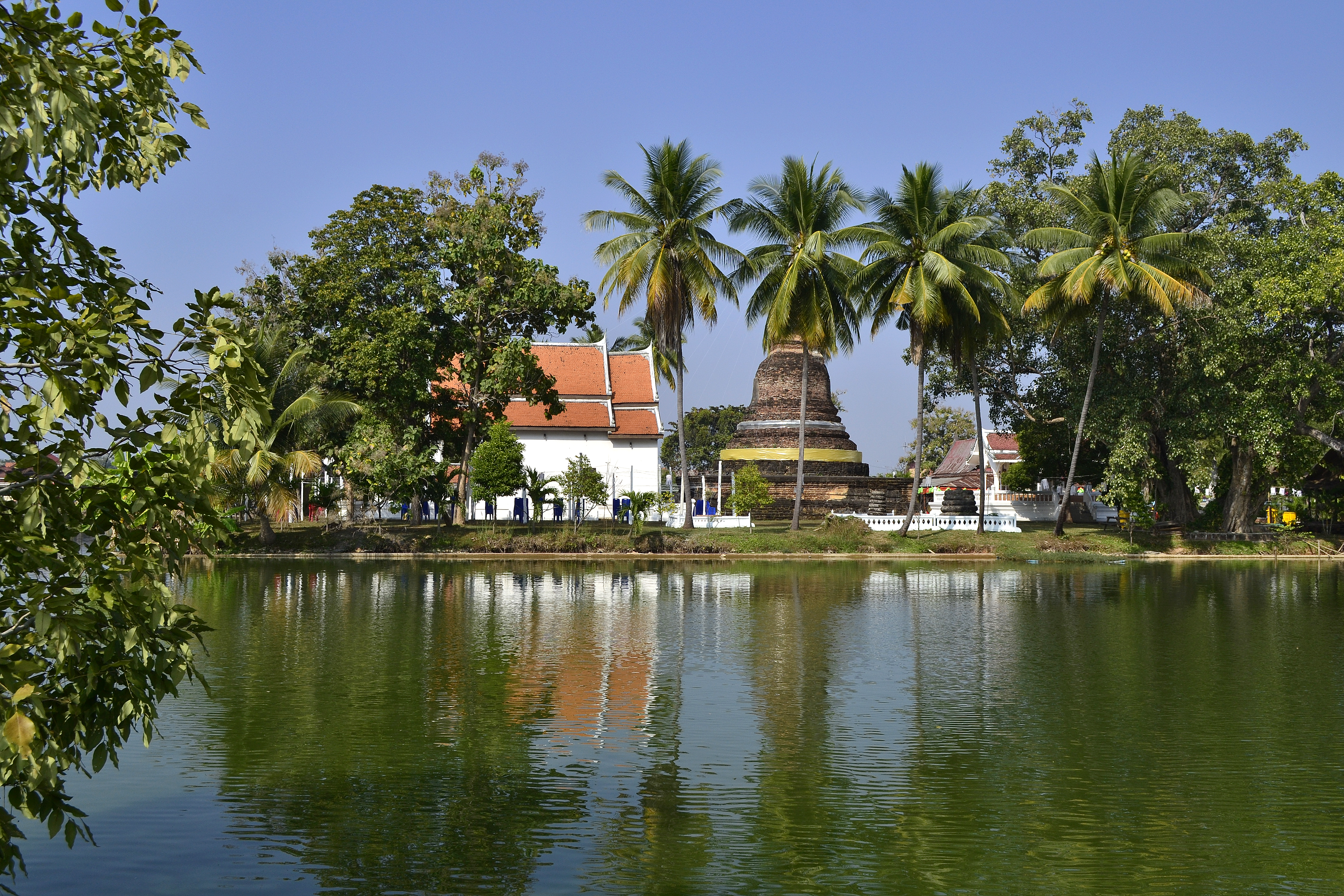
Wat Traphang Thong

Wat Traphang Thong (Thai: วัดตระพังทอง) means golden lake monastery. The temple is located next to the Sukhothai eastern ramparts and the eastern city gate, the "Kamphaeng-Hak" gate. The temple itself is located on an island in a lake and can be reached via a pedestrian bridge from the main road. There is a typical main stupa in Sukhothai style and eight smaller stupas around the main one. A simple ordination hall was founded in 1917 by a governor of Sukhothai. The most important artifact of the temple is a footprint of the Buddha, which is located in a modern mandapa next to the stupa. The footprint was created in 1359 out of dark gray stone by Lithai. Wat Traphang Thong is the only temple of the historical park, in which an active community of monks lives.

=== Wat Tuek ===
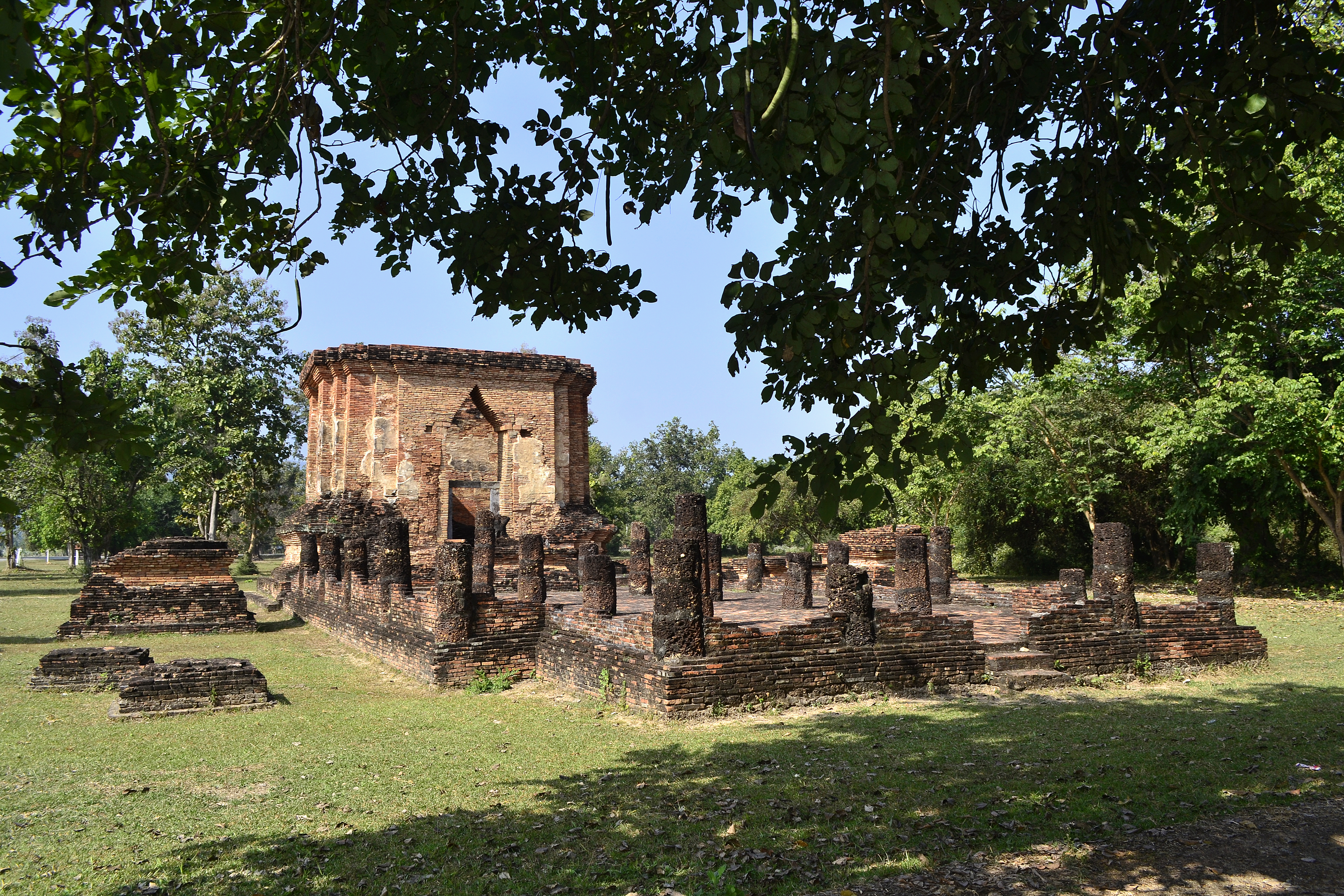
Wat Tuek

Wat Tuek (Thai: วัดตึก) lies approximately 400 meters west of the O Gate (Thai: ประตูอ้อ) outside the old Sukhothai. This temple was founded in the time of Sukhothai Kingdom. In 1970 to 1971 the temple was restored by the Fine Arts Department. On the small temple grounds there is a small mandapa with a side length of eight meters contains a seated Buddha statue made of bricks that was once covered with stucco. The mandapa has three brick walls and a porch on the east side which is similar to Wat Si Chum, but is much smaller scale. There was a stucco reliefs on the outer sides, which can be seen on historical photos depicting scenes the life of Buddha. East of mandapa are the remains of a vihara with dimensions of 10 × 14 meters with some laterite pillars and a greatly dilapidated Buddha image made of laterite. The vihara is surrounded by several smaller stupa bases.

=== Wat Sorasak ===
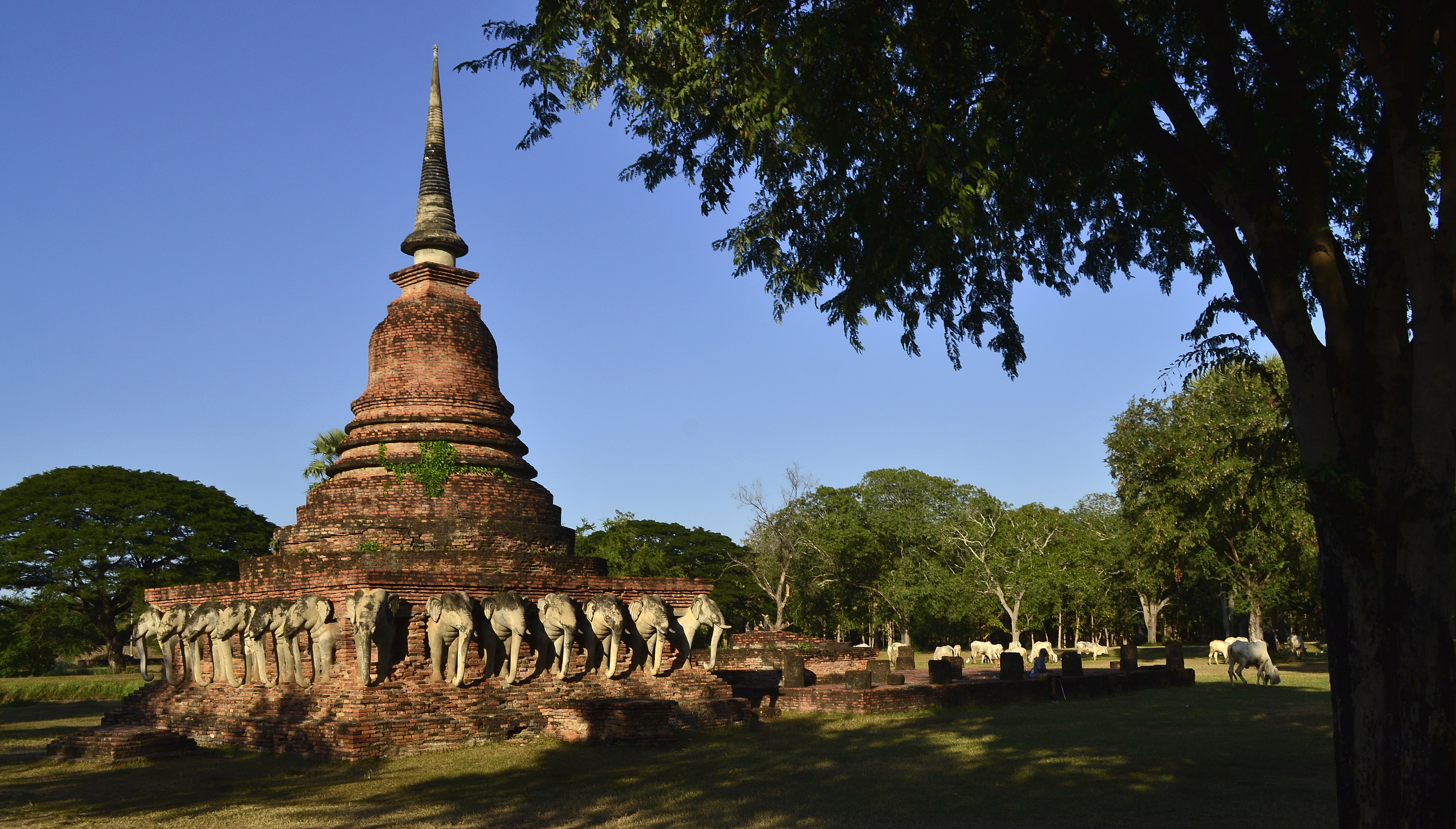
Wat Sorasak

Wat Sorasak (Thai: วัดสรศักดิ์) was founded in the time of the Kingdom of Sukhothai during the reign of Sailuethai. In 1955 a stone inscription was discovered by the Fine Arts Department and called "Wat Sorasak stone inscription" also Inscription no. 49. It is now in the Ramkhamhaeng National Museum. Because of this stone inscription, the foundation year of Wat Sorasak can be dated to 1412. Nai Inthara Sorasak, the temple founder and the author of the stone inscription was probably an officer from Ayutthaya Kingdom, sent by Intha Racha to secure the interests of Ayutthaya over Sukhothai. According to the stone inscription, there was a great stupa, vihara, a building for Buddha image in the temple complex. The Lanka style stupa was surrounded by elephants and decorated with a seated Buddha image on a square base. The stupa is reminiscent of Ramkhamhaeng's Wat Chang Lom in Si Satchanalai Historical Park. The Fine Arts Department found the remains of elephants statues and fragments of the Buddha image.

=== Thuriang Kilns ===
The Thuriang Kilns (Thai: เตาทุเรียง) are ruins of the old celadon factory, which may have been founded in the late 13th century, are situated near the city moat near Wat Phra Phai Luang. This is a site where Sukhothai celadons were made. So far, 49 kilns have been discovered in 3 different areas: 37 lie north of the moat, 9 to the south, near the city wall, and 3 to the east. The vaulted brick kilns measure 1.5 – 2 metres wide and 4.5 metres long. The ceramic wares found here are generally large bowls and jars; they have a matt yellowish grey glaze, and a design, usually of a flower, a fish, or a whirling circle, painted in black.

=== Saritphong Dam or Thamnop Phra Ruang ===
Saritphong Dam or Thamnop Phra Ruang (Thai: เขื่อนสรีดภงค์ หรือ ทำนบพระร่วง) is an ancient dam, now restored by the Irrigation Department, comprises earthenworks that stretched between Khao Phra Bat Yai Mountain and Khao Kio Ai Ma Mountain. There was a spillway and pipes to carry water across canals towards the city gates to be further reserved at the Traphang Ngoen and Traphang Thong lakes. Water from these reservoirs was used in the old city and the palace of Sukhothai.

== Gallery ==
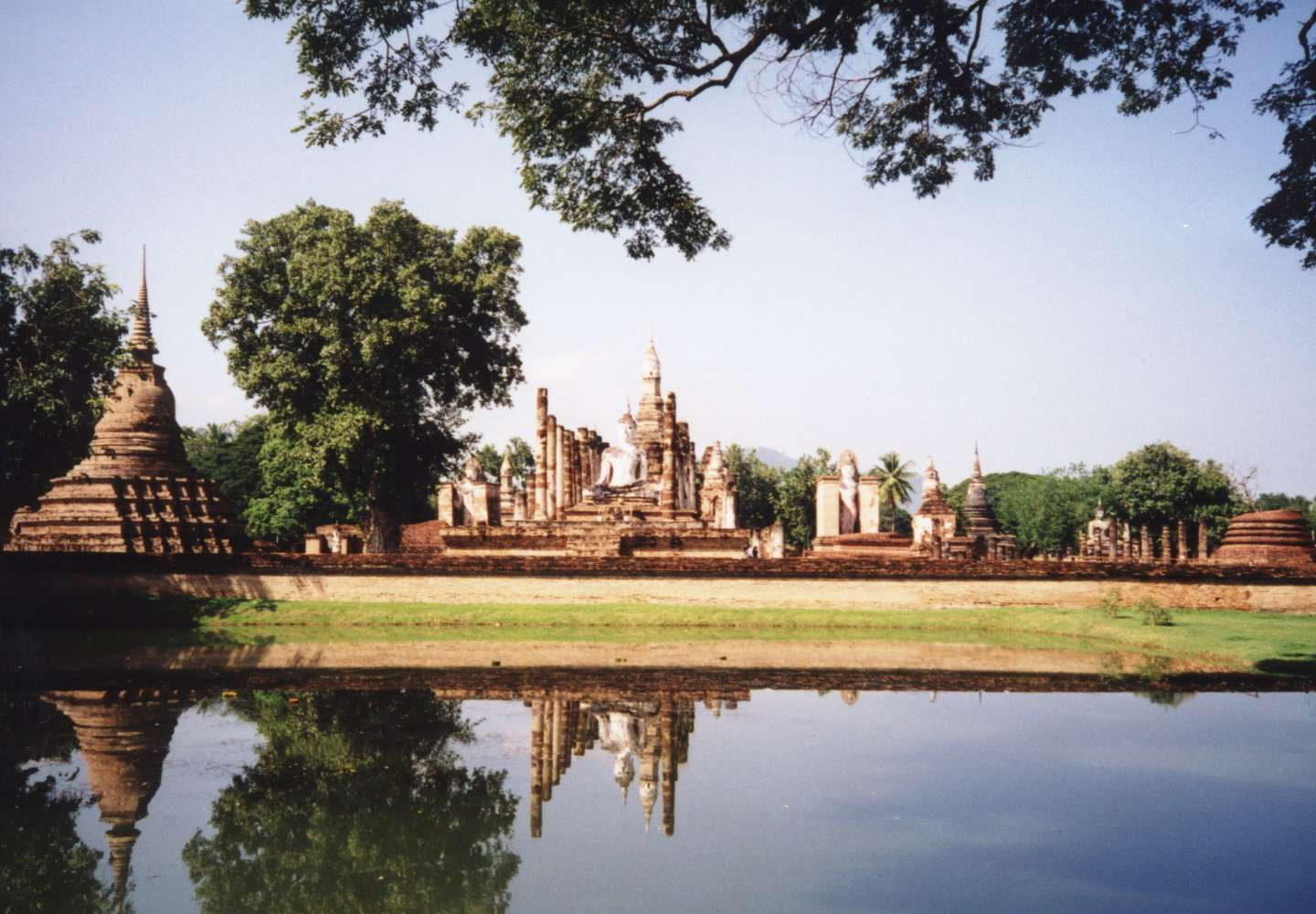
Wat Mahathat

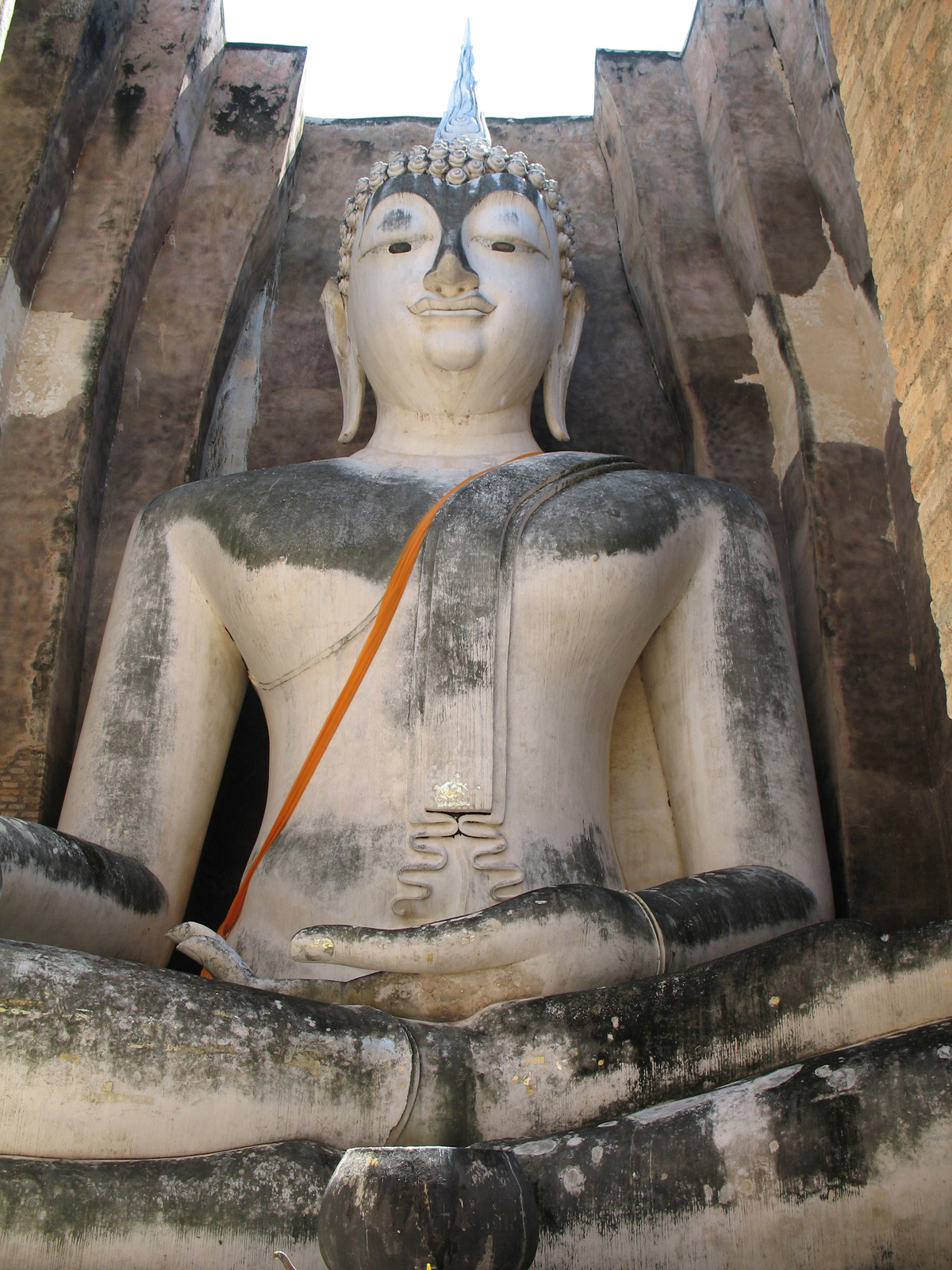
Phra Achana, Wat Si Chum

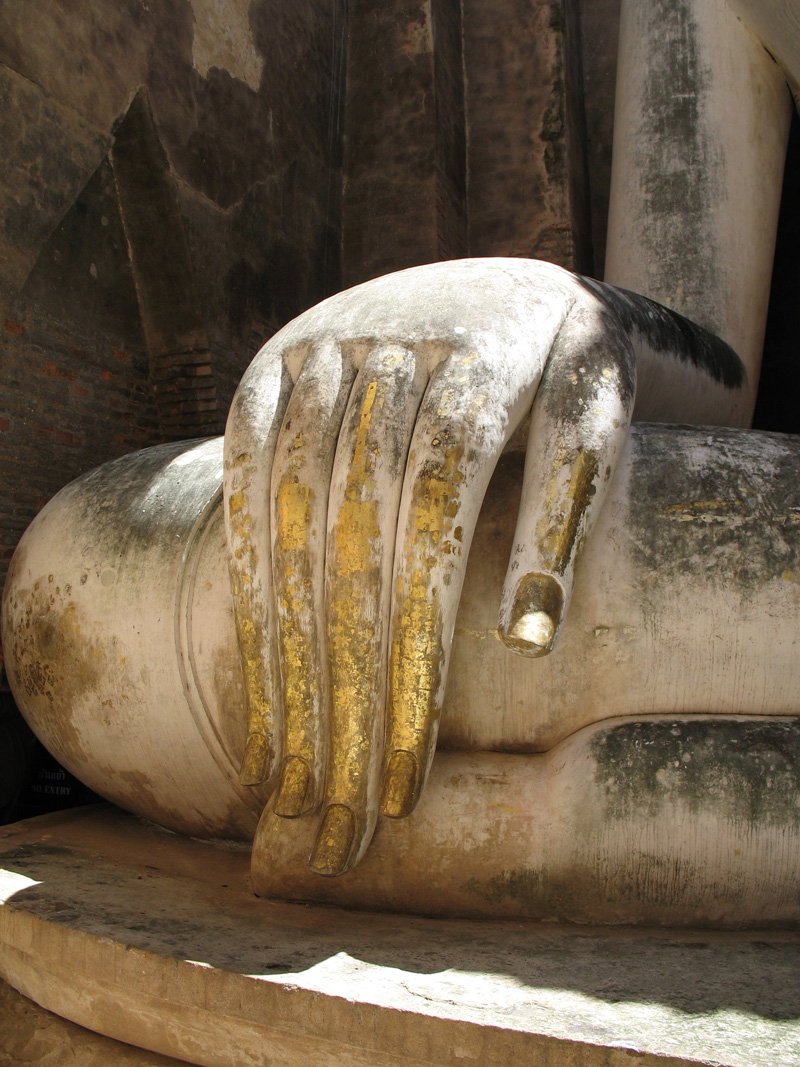
Phra Achana hand, Sukhothai Province

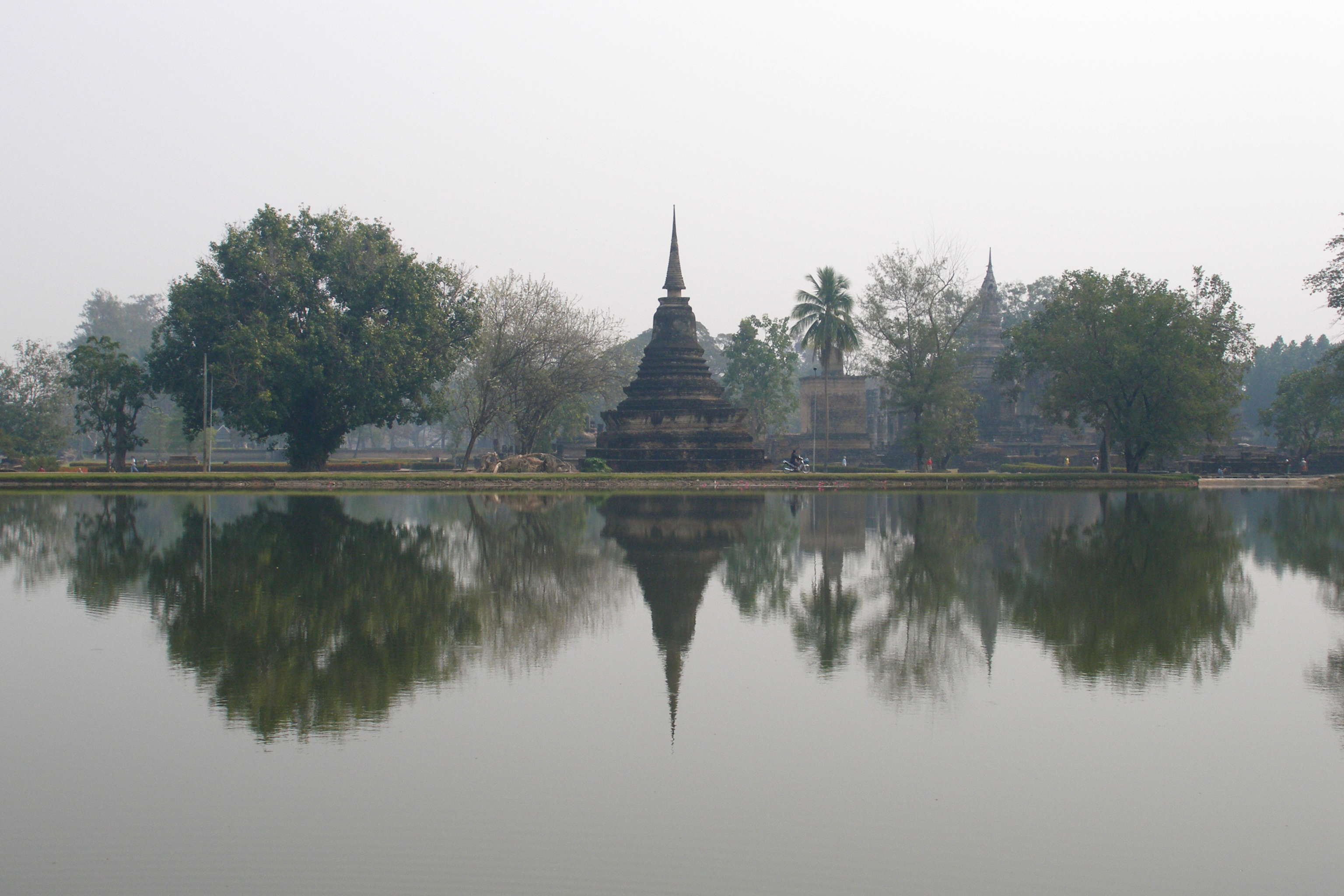
Ponds

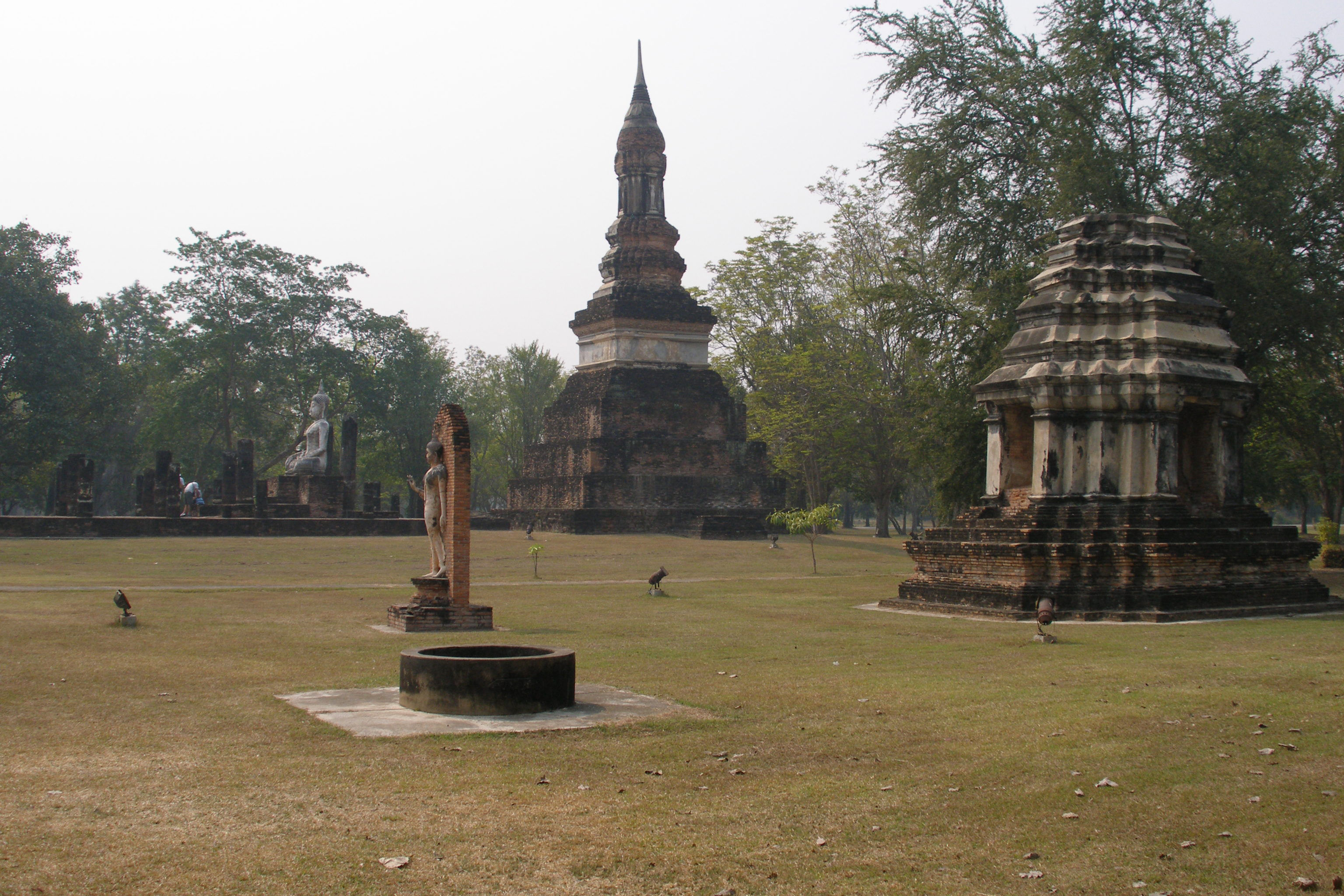
Stupas of Wat Mahathat

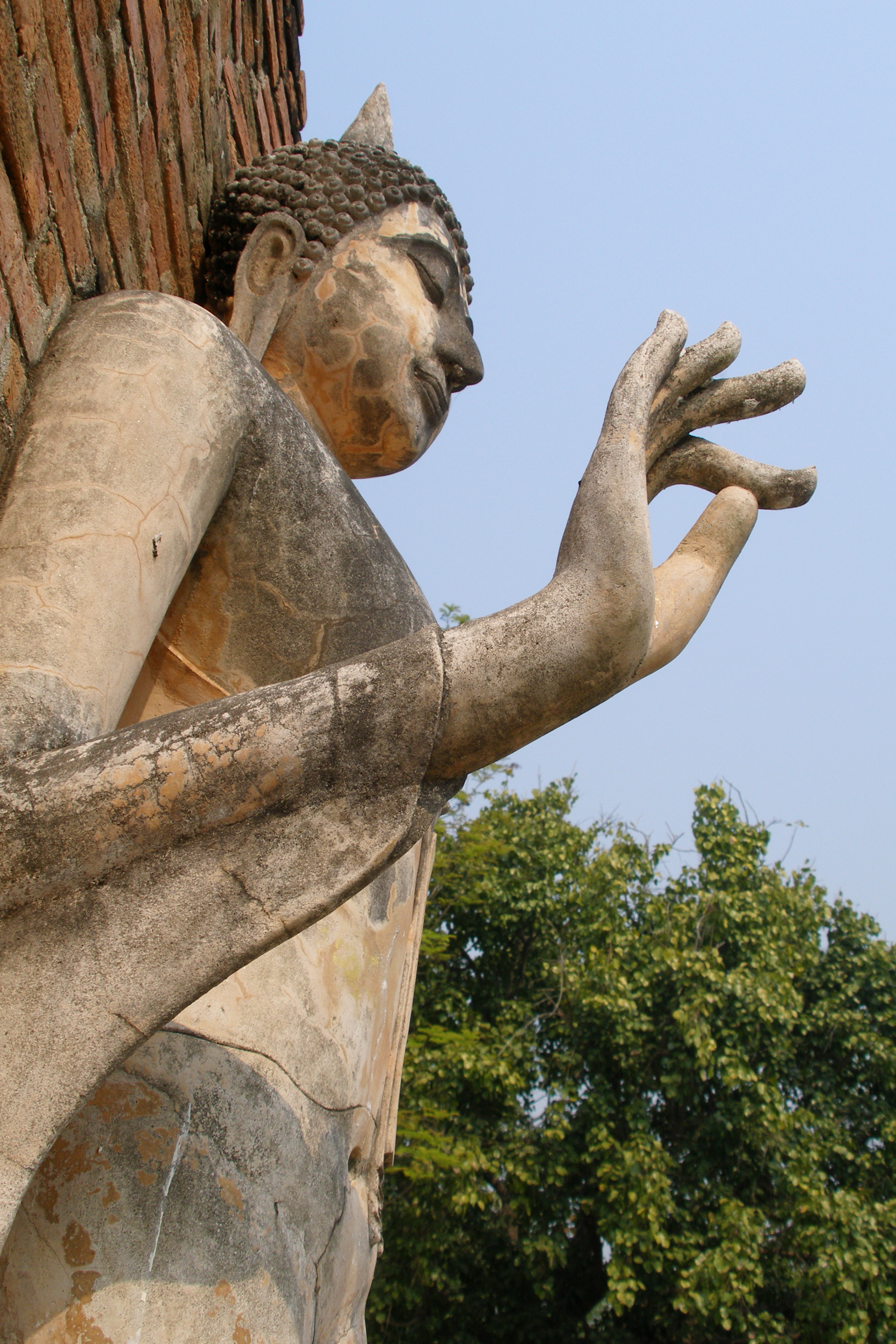
Statue of Buddha with gesture

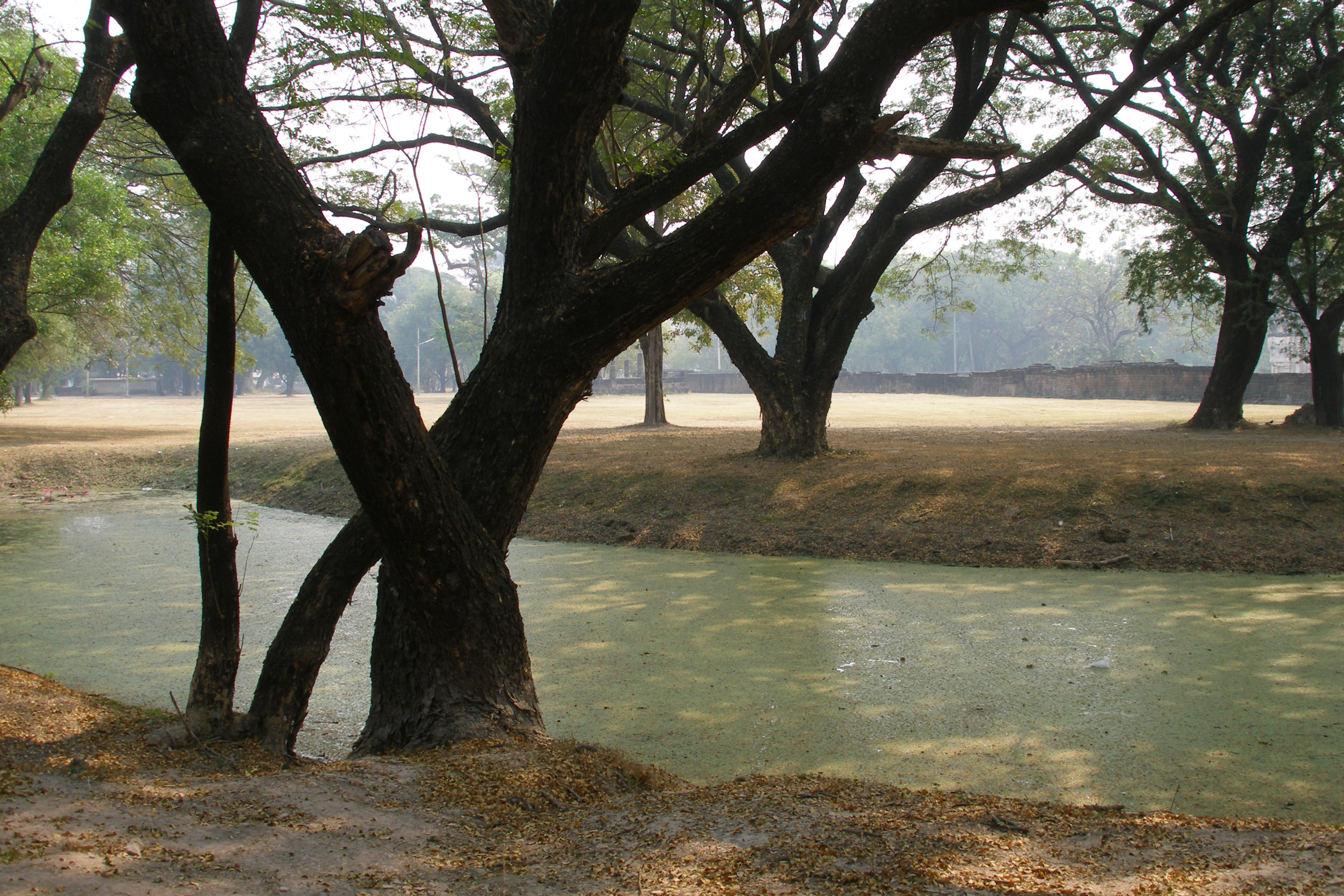
Moat

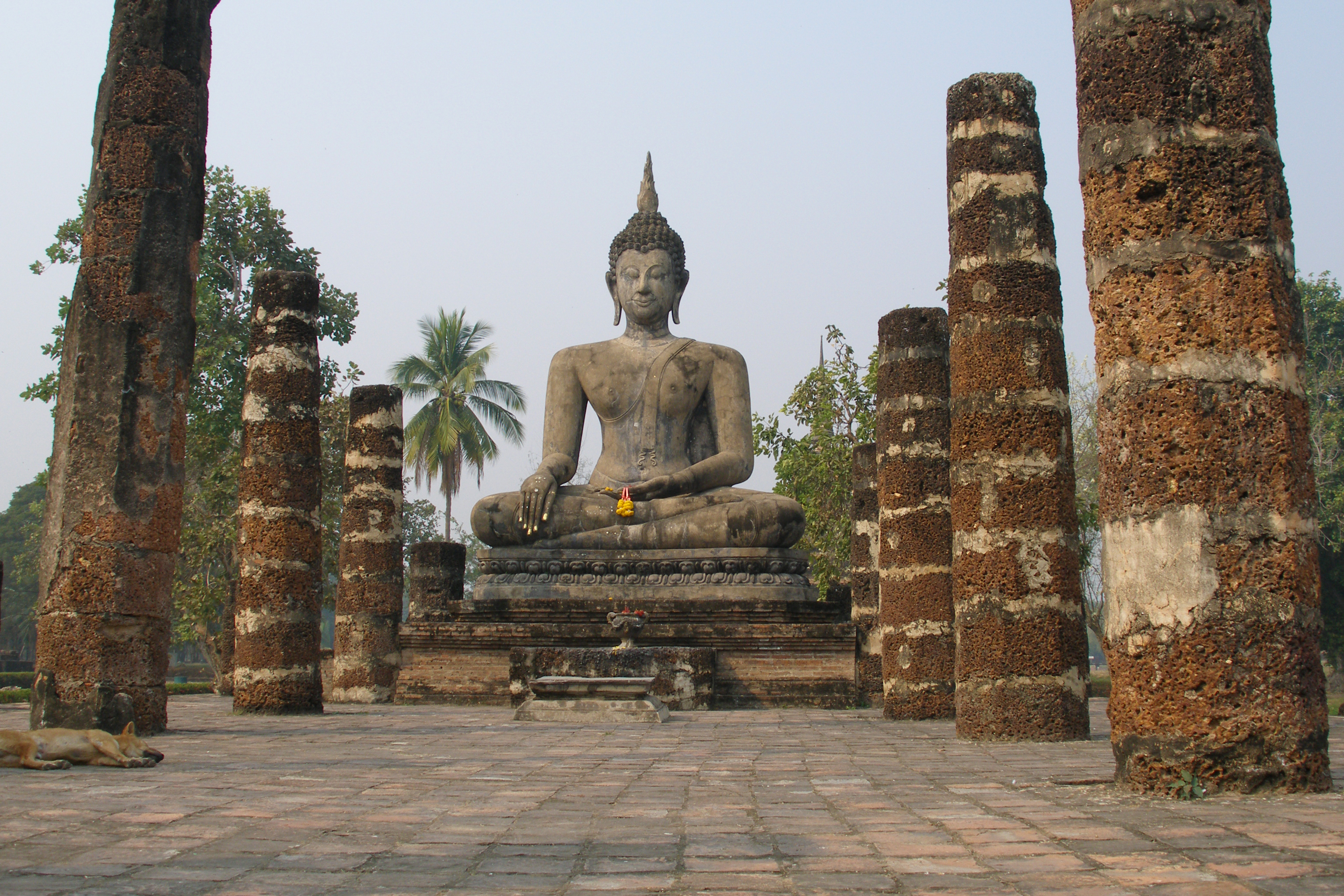
Statue of Buddha in Wat Mahathat

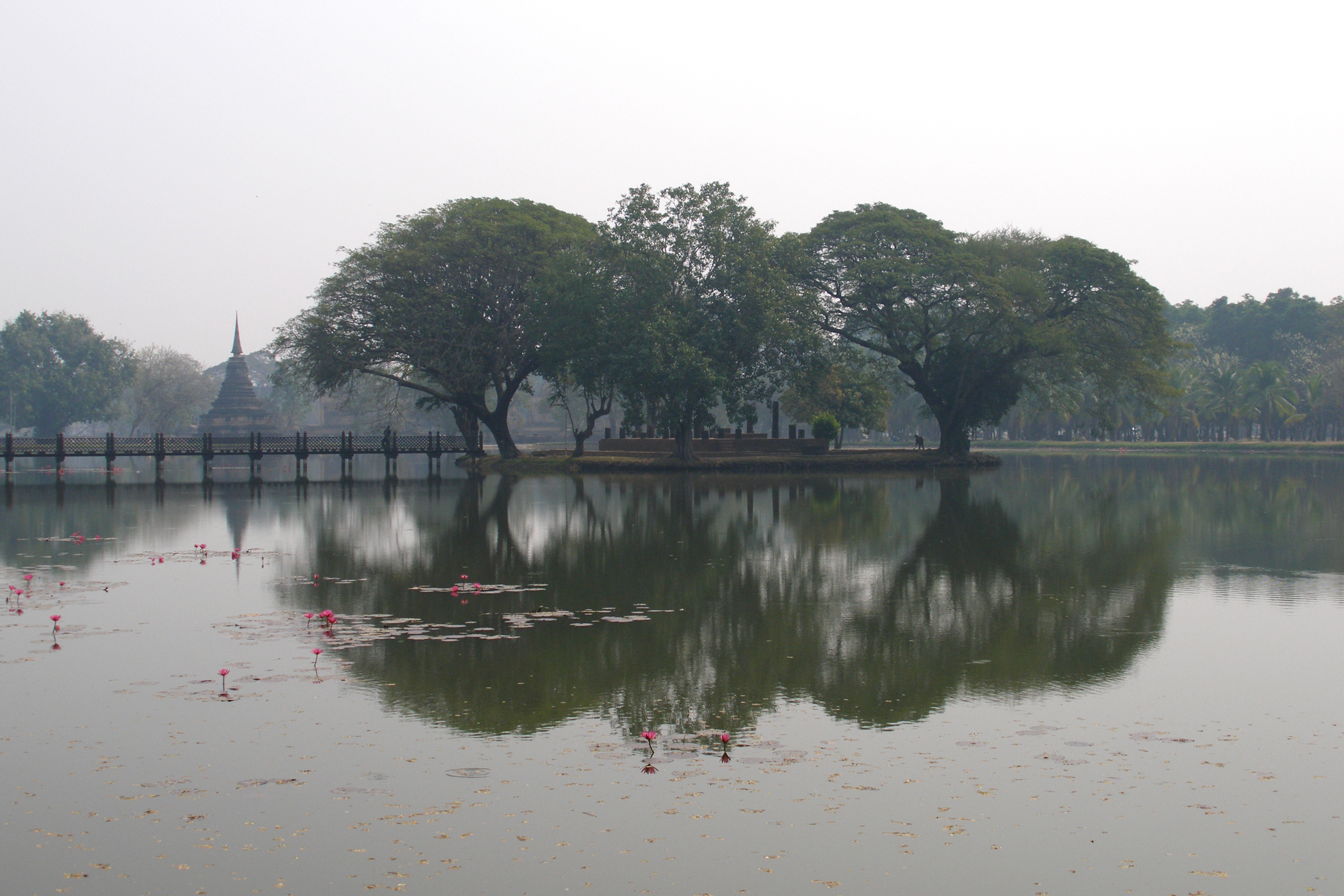
Wat Traphang Ngoen on the lake

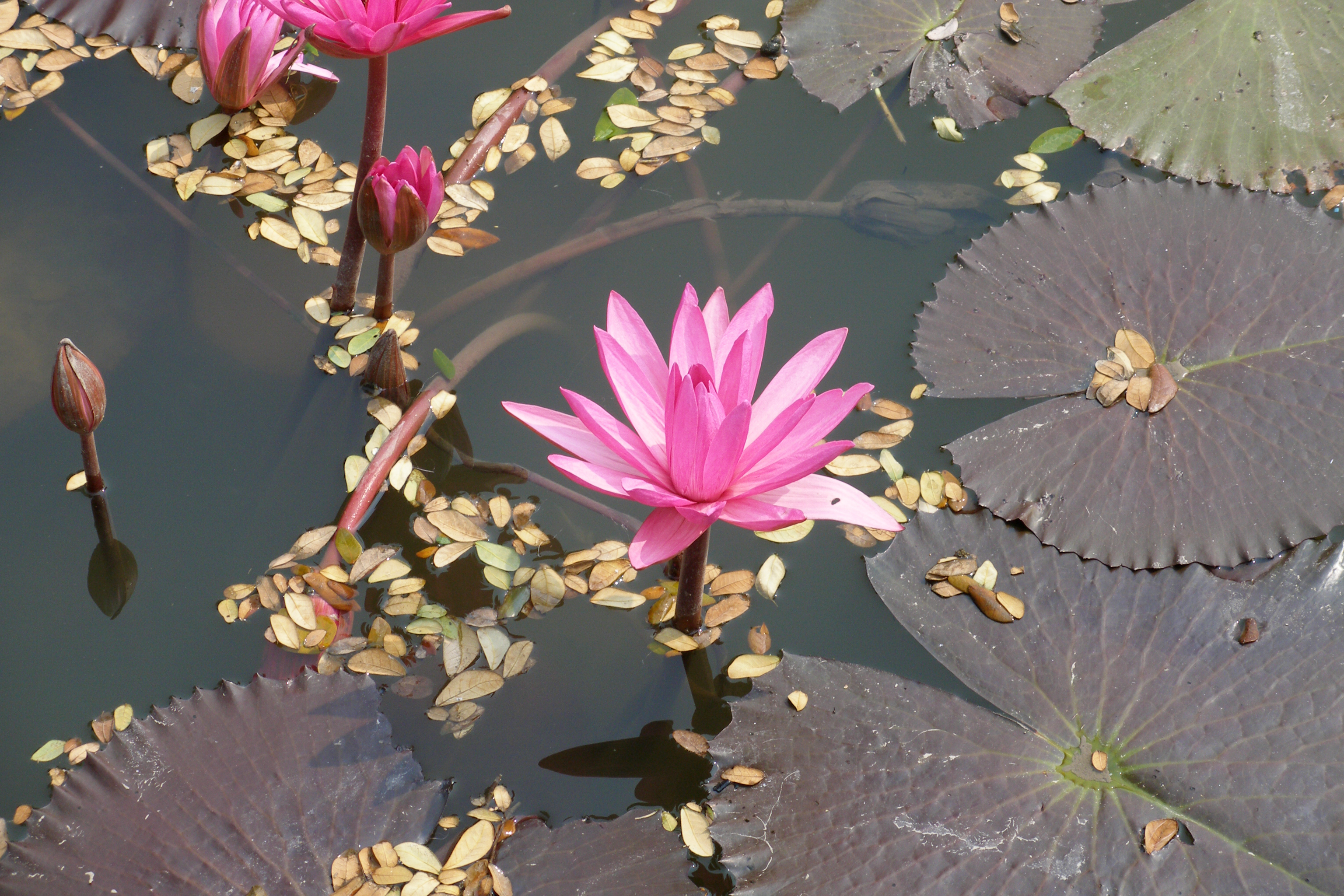
Lotus flowers on the lake

== See also ==
- History of Thailand
- Si Satchanalai Historical Park
- Ayutthaya Historical Park
- Si Thep Historical Park
- Phu Phra Bat Historical Park
- Ban Chiang
- List of World Heritage Sites in Thailand
