= Sukhothai (city) =

Capital of the Sukhothai Kingdom in Thailand

Coordinates: 17°01′N 99°42′E

Sukhothai สุโขทัย
- City
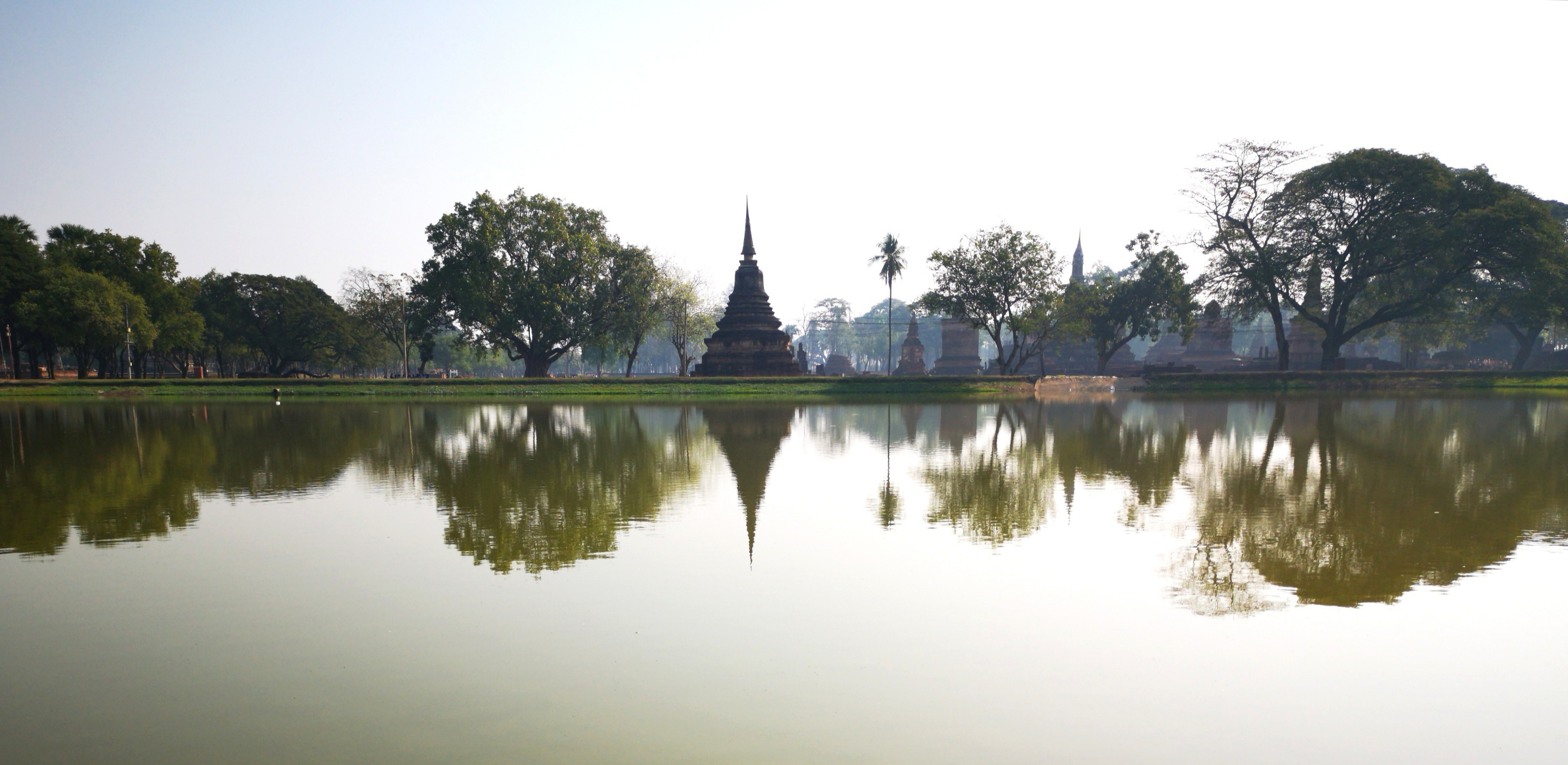
- Lake in historical park of Sukhothai
- Interactive map of Sukhothai

Area
  - Total: 6,596 km^{2} (2,547 sq mi)

Population (2012)
  - Total: 35,713
  - Density: 5.414/km^{2} (14.02/sq mi)

UNESCO World Heritage Site
- Official name: Historic Town of Sukhothai and Associated Historic Towns
- Location: Thailand
- Includes: Sukhothai Historical Park; Si Satchanalai Historical Park; Kamphaeng Phet Historical Park
- Criteria: Cultural: i, iii
- Reference: 574
- Inscription: 1991 (15th Session)
- Area: 11,852 ha (29,290 acres)

Sukhothai (Thai: สุโขทัย, pronounced [sù.kʰǒː.tʰāj]) was the capital of the Sukhothai Kingdom (also known as the Kingdom of Siam). Sukhothai is a historic city in north-central Thailand and the former capital of the Sukhothai Kingdom, one of the earliest major Thai states. It flourished during the 13th and 14th centuries and is widely regarded as an important center in the development of Thai politics, religion, art, and urban planning. Today, the remains of the ancient city are preserved in Sukhothai Historical Park, while the modern city is located nearby. The historic town of Sukhothai, together with Si Satchanalai and Kamphaeng Phet, was inscribed on the UNESCO World Heritage List in 1991.

== History ==
Sukhothai is from Sanskrit sukha (सुख "happiness") + udaya (उदय "rise, emergence"), meaning "dawn of happiness". Founded in 1238, it is about 427 km north of Bangkok. Sukhothai was the capital of the Thai Empire for approximately 140 years. As of 2014, 193 temples have been excavated and partly reconstructed.

=== Founding of the Kingdom ===
Sukhothai was founded in the mid-13th century, when local Tai rulers broke away from Khmer rule and established an independent kingdom in north-central Thailand. According to historical accounts, the kingdom began as a small regional power, but its location allowed it to grow into an important political center.In the early period, Sukhothai developed both as a royal capital and as a religious center, with temples, moats, reservoirs, and defensive walls forming the core of the city.

=== Sukhothai Period ===
Sukhothai reached its height during the reign of King Ramkhamhaeng in the late 13th century. Under his rule, the kingdom expanded its influence across much of mainland Southeast Asia and became the first major Tai state in the region.Sukhothai was also known for the promotion of Theravada Buddhism, the growth of trade, and the development of a distinct artistic tradition known as the Sukhothai style.The monuments and sculptures associated with this period are regarded as important examples of early Thai architecture and Buddhist art.

In addition to its political importance, Sukhothai became a center of cultural development. Its artistic achievements, especially Buddha images and temple architecture, showed a blend of local traditions and outside influences that were gradually adapted into a clearly recognizable Thai form.For this reason, Sukhothai is often seen as one of the earliest foundations of later Thai civilization.

=== Decline and integration to Ayutthaya ===
After the reign of Ramkhamhaeng, Sukhothai gradually lost political strength as outlying territories became more difficult to control and neighboring states grew more powerful. By the 14th century, Ayutthaya had risen in the central plains and became the dominant force in the region. Sukhothai eventually came under Ayutthayan influence and later lost its independent status. Even so, its political traditions, religious role, and artistic achievements continued to influence Thai society long after the kingdom itself had declined.

== Geography ==
Sukhothai is located in Sukhothai province, in north-central Thailand and occupies an important position in the historical geography of the upper Chao Phraya basin. In the 13th and 14th centuries, it developed into a major political and cultural center, and its location helped connect it with surrounding settlements and regional networks in mainland Southeast Asia. The ancient city was carefully laid out with defensive walls, moats, water reservoirs, religious buildings, and ceremonial spaces, showing an advanced form of urban planning for its period. In the present day, the historic core survives as Sukhothai Historical Park, while the modern city is situated nearby and functions as the main urban center of the province.

== Administration ==
Sukhothai served historically as the political and administrative center of the Sukhothai Kingdom, one of the earliest major Thai states in mainland Southeast Asia. From the 13th century, the city functioned as the royal capital, where kings such as Ramkhamhaeng exercised authority over surrounding territories and established early forms of Thai governance, law, and political organization.The administration of the kingdom was closely linked with religious institutions, particularly Theravada Buddhism, and the urban structure of the city—consisting of temples, reservoirs, and defensive walls—reflected both political authority and spiritual significance.

Following the decline of the Sukhothai Kingdom in the 14th century, the city gradually lost its status as an independent administrative center and came under the influence of the Ayutthaya Kingdom, becoming integrated into a broader regional political system. Despite this transition, Sukhothai continued to play an important cultural and historical role in the development of Thai society.

In the present day, the modern urban area associated with Sukhothai is administered as Sukhothai Thani Town Municipality, located in Mueang Sukhothai District within Sukhothai Province. This municipality functions as a local administrative unit responsible for urban management, public services, and local governance within the provincial administrative structure. At the same time, the ancient city is preserved separately as part of Sukhothai Historical Park, reflecting a clear distinction between the modern administrative town and the historic capital of the former kingdom.

== Economy and Tourism ==
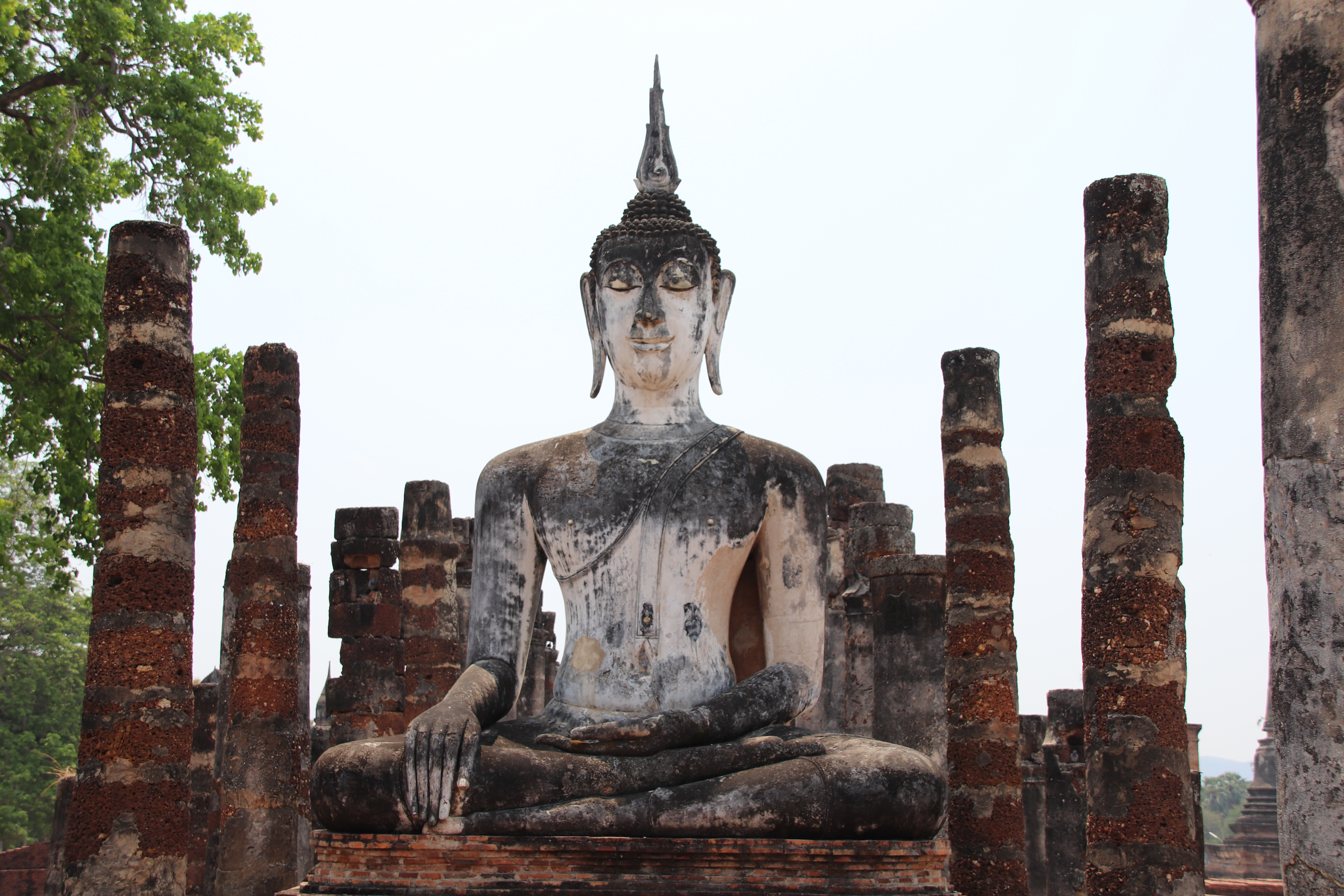
Sukhothai Historical Park

Sukhothai is recognized as one of Thailand’s most important cultural tourism destinations, reflecting its historical role as a major early center of Thai civilization and the capital of the Sukhothai Kingdom. The province contains numerous archaeological sites, temple ruins, and cultural landscapes that demonstrate the development of Thai art, architecture, and written language.

The Sukhothai Historical Park is an important cultural and historical site in Thailand, preserving the remains of the ancient city of Sukhothai, which served as the capital of the Sukhothai Kingdom in the 13th century.The park contains numerous monuments and architectural structures dating from the 13th to the 15th centuries, representing the early development of Thai civilization and architecture.

During the Sukhothai Kingdom, architectural styles were influenced by earlier Khmer traditions as well as elements associated with Sri Lankan (Singhalese) Buddhism. Over time, these external influences were adapted into a distinct Sukhothai style, characterized by features such as lotus-shaped chedis and an emphasis on Buddhist symbolism, reflecting the central role of religion in society.

Today, Sukhothai Historical Park preserves numerous temples, ruins, and Buddha statues that illustrate the artistic and cultural achievements of the Sukhothai period. Due to its historical and cultural significance, the site was inscribed on the UNESCO World Heritage List in 1991 as part of the “Historic Town of Sukhothai and Associated Historic Towns.” Preservation and conservation efforts continue to maintain the integrity of the remaining structures within the park.

== Culture ==
Sukhothai is widely regarded as one of the spiritual origins of the Loy Krathong festival, with traditions dating back to the Sukhothai Kingdom. The celebration is held annually to honor the water goddess, Phra Mae Khongkha, and symbolizes the act of letting go of misfortune while expressing gratitude for water.

A defining characteristic of the Sukhothai celebration is Phao Thian Len Fai, which translates to “the burning of candles and playing with fire.” This practice involves elaborate candle lighting and fireworks displays and remains one of the best-known cultural traditions associated with Sukhothai.

== Transportation ==
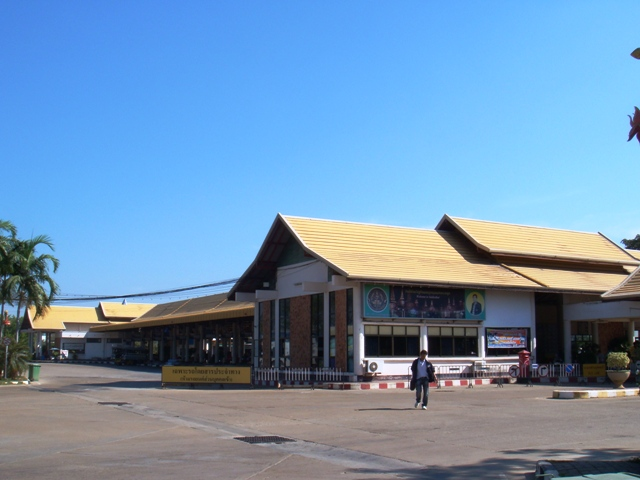
Sukhothai Bus Terminal

Sukhothai Historical Park is served by a range of transportation options connecting it with other major cities in Thailand. The province is divided into two main areas: Old Sukhothai, where the historical park is located, and New Sukhothai, the modern city and primary transport hub, situated approximately 12 km apart.

Most long-distance buses arrive at the Sukhothai Bus Terminal in New Sukhothai, which provides connections to cities such as Bangkok, Chiang Mai, and Phitsanulok. Old Sukhothai has a smaller bus stop where some buses may pick up or drop off passengers before continuing to the main terminal.

Local transportation between Old and New Sukhothai is available via buses running every 30 minutes from 6:00 a.m. to 5:00 p.m., with a travel time of around 30 minutes and a fare of approximately 30 baht. Additional options include tuk-tuks, songthaews (shared pickup trucks), and bicycles.

Bus services connect Sukhothai with several regional destinations. Routes from Chiang Mai operate daily and take approximately 5–6 hours, while services from Phitsanulok run hourly and take just over one hour. Other connections include Kamphaeng Phet, Khon Kaen, and Mukdahan.

Sukhothai does not have a railway station; the nearest station is located in Phitsanulok, about 60 km away. From there, buses and vans provide onward transport to Sukhothai.

Air travel is available via Sukhothai Airport, located approximately 40 km from the historical park and operated by Bangkok Airways. Although typically more expensive than other options, it offers the fastest access to the area.
