= Wat Thung Setthi =

Buddhist temple in Khon Kaen province, Thailand

Coordinates: 16.411658°N 102.883599°E

Wat Thung Setthi (Thai: วัดทุ่งเศรษฐี), located at Ban Nong Hai (Phralub subdistrict) near Mueang District of Khon Kaen province, is a relatively new Thai Buddhist temple near the Route 230 ring road. Wat Thung Setthi means Temple (of the) Millionaire's Field, implying that people who make merit here are, or will become, millionaires.

There is a temple of the same name in Bangkok and a ruined temple of that name in Sukhothai Province, located near the Ramnarong Gate outside the Si Satchanalai Historical Park.

== History of Wat Thung Setthi, Khon Kaen ==
Wat Thung Setthi is somewhat different from the typical Thai temple because of its white exterior with gold and blue accents, rather than the traditional gold and red temples seen throughout the Kingdom.

Its present address is Phra Lap, Mueang Khon Kaen District, Khon Kaen Province 40000. Its location is surrounded by rice fields as it sits in a still rural open atmosphere (being true to its name) from Khon Kaen City proper, which is about a 15-minute drive away. The wat grounds cover approximately 29 acres and its planning and construction began in 1999 by Luangta Oy. The developer was a strong supporter of the Dheravata Doctrine of Luangpu-Mon Puritatto to proclaim Buddhism to laypersons in northeast Thailand. According to Luangta Oy, the temple was not only built for worshippers to make merit but as a tribute to pay homage to the then living King Rama IX and the Chakri Dynasty. Major construction was completed in 2012.

The site location was believed to be holy land where the three worlds of heaven, earth and the underworld (hell) intersect.

== Temple grounds and structures ==
The major structure on the grounds is the Maha Rattana Chedi Sri Trai Loka Dhatu which contains a relic of the Buddha, a crystal sacred lower right tooth and was the final major building dedicated in 2012. Since the chedi is located at the intersection of the three worlds, those who come to worship will pay respect to the three chedis of the three worlds simultaneously.

Located across the pond and to the eastern side of the Maha Rattana Chedi are Vanfau Chulamani and Nagachedi Srinagin Pier where worshippers can pay homage to the two chedis of the Heavens and the Underworld. The reflection of the Maha Rattana from the pier (to the south) represents the Chedi of the Underworld. Then looking north one can see a stand with a great mirror that also reflects the image of the Maha Rattana and represents the Chedi of the Heavens. There are four pagodas around the outside, representing the earth, water, wind, fire, which are the basic elements of the world.

The Mondop Ong Pathom (Chapel of the First Buddha) is a small temple with a sculpture of Samdaj Ong Pathom, a Buddha image surrounded by the three statues of the leaders of three noble orders – Luangpur Pan, Luangpur Ruesee Lingdam and Luangpu Sa Apassaro.

The Phra Buddha Nilavarno Silotrapyudom contains a Lopburi-style Buddha image made of brass and painted black while the robes and jewelry are covered with gold leaf and inlaid with colorful stones.

The Naraka or Hell Outdoor Museum contains sculptures of Pretas and the five levels of hell. The sign to the sculpture gardens states "Welcome to Hell" and the display features vivid depictions of what sinners face in the afterlife after facing the Death King.

What makes the temple unique are the contemporary touches such as the etchings in the glass windows, which are usually shown as engraving or carving on wood at other Buddhist temples. The themes depicted are all labelled in English as well as Thai and are juxtaposed between ancient Buddhist moralistic tales mingled with very modern interpretations of those same moral values. Shown are not only Hindu deities like Shiva and Indra but also fictional modern day pop culture characters too. Included in the glass etchings, are Lilo and Stitch, Mickey Mouse, Dumbo, Doraemon and even Jabba the Hut and Darth Vader. There are other modern themes such as science labs and rockets, along with zodiac signs displayed around the temple.

== See also ==
- Wat Thung Setthi, Bangkok
- Thung Setthi Fortress
