= Historic Town of Sukhothai and Associated Historic Towns =

Coordinates: 17°0′26″N 99°47′23″E

UNESCO World Heritage Site
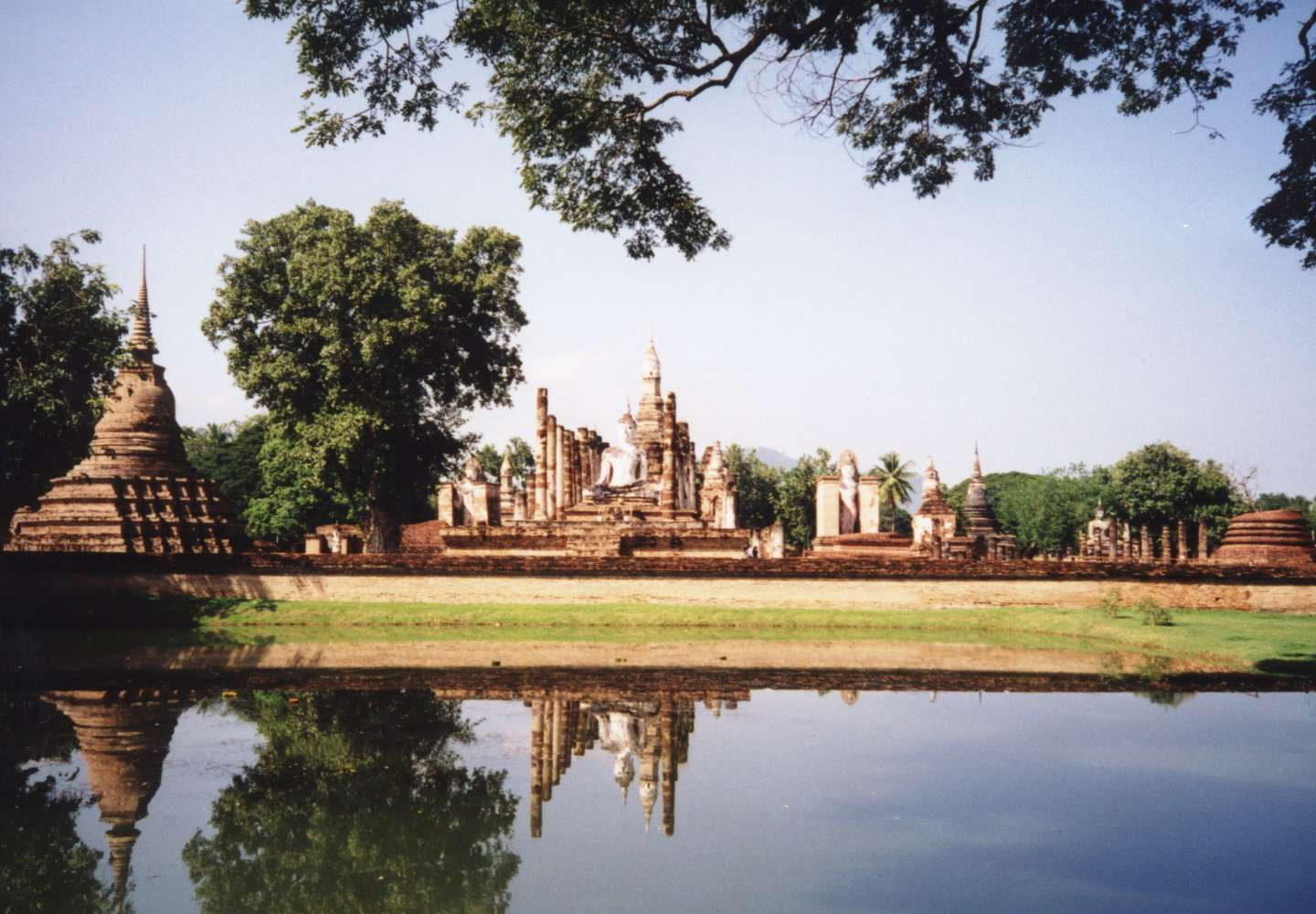
- Wat Si Chum in Sukhothai historical park

- Location within Thailand
- Location: Sukhothai and Kamphaeng Phet provinces in Thailand
- Includes: 1. Sukhothai Historical Park; 2. Si Satchanalai Historical Park; 3. Kamphaeng Phet Historical Park
- Criteria: Cultural: (i), (iii)
- Reference: 574
- Inscription: 1991 (15th Session)
- Area: 11,852 ha (29,290 acres)

The Historic Town of Sukhothai and Associated Historic Towns is a UNESCO World Heritage Site which consists of Sukhothai historical park, Kamphaeng Phet historical park and Si Satchanalai historical park. These historical parks preserve the remains of the three main cities of the Sukhothai Kingdom which flourished during the 13th and 14th century CE. The Sukhothai Kingdom is viewed as having been the first of the Thai kingdoms.

== Sukhothai Historical Park ==
Sukhothai Historical Park (Thai: อุทยานประวัติศาสตร์สุโขทัย) covers the ruins of Sukhothai, which means 'Dawn of Happiness', capital of the Sukhothai Kingdom in the 13th and 14th centuries, in what is now the north of Thailand. It is near the modern city of Sukhothai, capital of a province of the same name. The city walls form a rectangle about 2 km east–west by 1.6 km north–south. There are 193 ruins on 70 square kilometers of land. There is a gate in the centre of each wall. Inside are the remains of the royal palace and twenty-six temples, the largest being Wat Mahathat.

== Si Satchanalai Historical Park ==
Si Satchanalai Historical Park (Thai: อุทยานประวัติศาสตร์ศรีสัชนาลัย) covers the ruins of Si Satchanalai, the second-most important town of the Sukhothai Kingdom. It is on a bank of the Yom River near the modern town of Si Satchanalai in Sukhothai Province. There are 215 ruins inside the historical park.

== Kamphaeng Phet Historical Park ==
Kamphaeng Phet Historical Park (Thai: อุทยานประวัติศาสตร์กำแพงเพชร) is an archeological site in Kamphaeng Phet. Major features in the Kamphaeng Phet Historical Park include archaeological remains of ancient sites such as Mueang Chakangrao to the east of the Ping River, Mueang Nakhon Chum to the west, and Mueang Trai Trueng some 18 km from the town to the southwest. Chakangrao, the ancient Kamphaeng Phet town, had the same town planning concept as the old Sukhothai and Si Satchanalai, with separate zones for religious sites both within and outside town limits. Structures are usually large and made of laterite. Religious sites on the west bank of the Ping River at Nakhon Chum are built of bricks and of smaller size. City walls and old fortifications mark the boundary of the rectangular town area, measuring 300–700 metres wide and 2,200 metres long.

== List of sites ==
Name	Type	Location	Picture
Sukhothai Historical Park	Historic Town	Mueang Sukhothai District, Sukhothai Province	
Si Satchanalai Historical Park	Historic Town	Si Satchanalai District, Sukhothai Province	
Kamphaeng Phet Historical Park	Historic Town	Mueang Kamphaeng Phet District, Kamphaeng Phet Province	
