= Kamphaeng Phet Historical Park =

UNESCO World Heritage Site
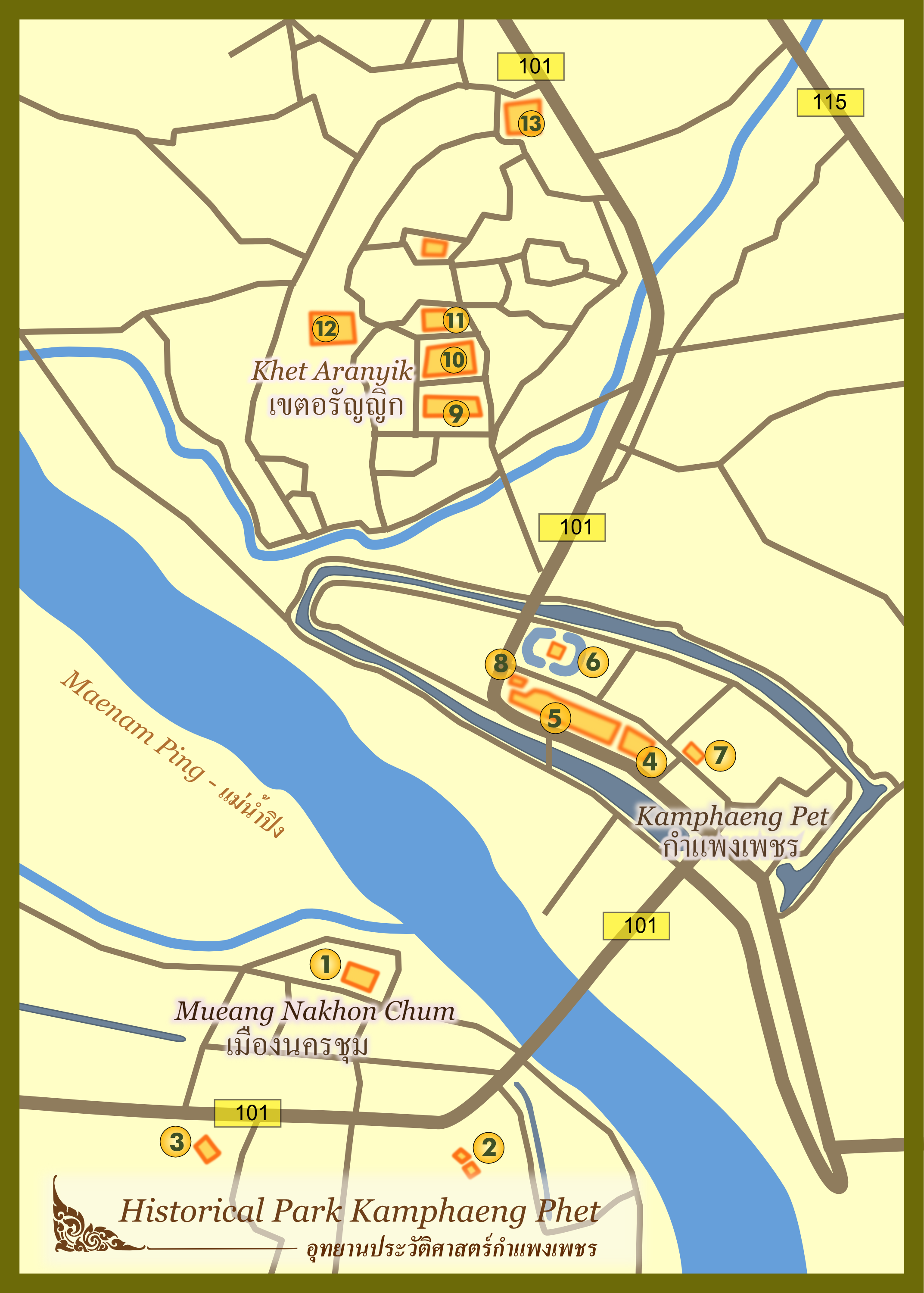

- Location within Thailand
- Location: Kamphaeng Phet Province, Thailand
- Part of: Historic Town of Sukhothai and Associated Historic Towns
- Criteria: Cultural: (i)(iii)
- Reference: 574-003
- Inscription: 1991 (15th Session)
- Area: 338 ha (840 acres)
- Coordinates: 16°28′N 99°30′E

Kamphaeng Phet Historical Park is an archeological site in Kamphaeng Phet, Thailand. Along with Sukhothai Historical Park and Si Satchanalai historical park, it is a part of the UNESCO World Heritage Site Historic Town of Sukhothai and Associated Historic Towns. Major features in the Kamphaeng Phet Historical Park include archaeological remains of ancient sites such as Mueang Chakangrao to the east of the Ping River, Mueang Nakhon Chum to the west and Mueang Trai Trueng some 18 km from the town to the southwest. Chakangrao, the ancient Kamphaeng Phet town, had the same town planning concept as the old Sukhothai and Si Satchanalai, with separate zones for religious sites both within and outside of town limits. Structures are usually large and made of laterite. Religious sites on the west bank of the Ping River at Nakhon Chum are built of bricks and of smaller size.

City walls and old fortifications mark the boundary of the rectangular town area, measuring 300-700 metres wide and 2,200 metres long.

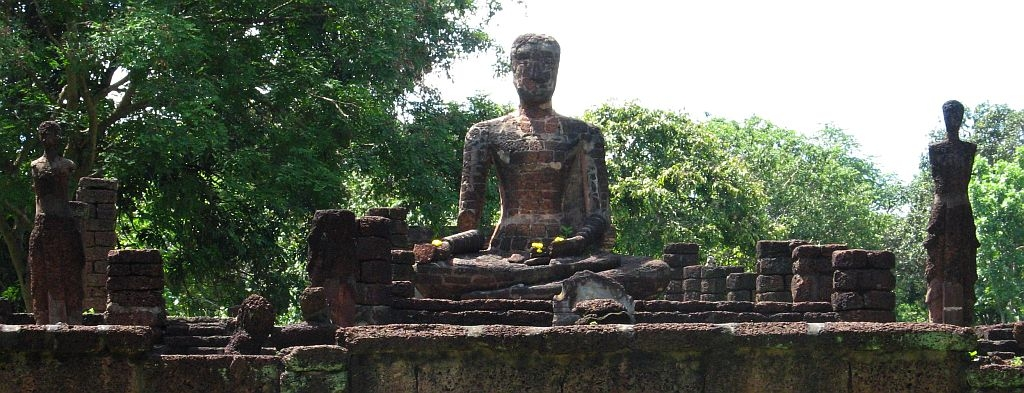
Ruins inside the Kamphaeng Phet Historical Park

== Sights ==
Wat Phra Kaeo (วัดพระแก้ว) is a large royal temple in town centre near a site believed to have been a palace. The temple itself was used on important city events and had no monks in residence. Major features include the principal chedi with lion-adorned base and a round chedi with elephant-adorned base. There are also other Chedis of different bases and remains of several chapels. Its boundary is marked off by laterite walls.

Second in size to Wat Phra Kaeo is Wat Phra That (วัดพระธาตุ). Here the principal Chedi is built of mixture of laterite and bricks with a 15-metre wide square base. The style is of Kamphaeng Phet architecture.

Sa Mon (สระมน) is the site of the palace to the north of Wat Phra Kaeo with a square earthen wall almost touching the northern city wall. Surrounding the walls on three sides are moats with a pond in the middle. There are no standing structures remaining today.

Wat Phra Non (วัดพระนอน) is enclosed by laterite walls on four sides. At the front of the temple are a square-shaped pond, restrooms, and an ancient floating pavilion which is supported by a large laterite column. The entire column was cut out in one single piece from its source and measures 1.1 m on each side and 6.4 m in height, the largest such stone in the country. A lion sculpture and Sema stones (boundary stones) can still be discerned. The large vihan which once housed the reclining Buddha has crumbled entirely.

Wat Phra Si Iriyabot (วัดพระสี่อิริยาบถ) is located to the north of Wat Phra Non and have similar pond and bathroom facilities as its neighbour. Walls on the four sides are of laterite materials with an entrance also made of laterite. A mondop structure houses Buddha statues in four postures-walking, sitting, standing and reclining in the Sukhothai artistic style. Today only the statue in the standing posture still remains.

Wat Phra Sing (วัดพระสิงห์) is believed to have been constructed during both the Sukhothai and Ayutthaya periods. With laterite walls, it has a square-shaped principal chedi with arches on four sides. In front of the ubosot are ornamental lion and Naga figurines.

Wat Chang Rop (also "Rob") (วัดช้างรอบ) is a large temple situated on a high hill. Its main chedi of Ceylonese style is in the middle of the yard but its top part is broken down. The base is adorned with 68 half-elephants between which are Bhoti-shaped designs. There are also traces of demon and female dancers’ figures remaining.

== Gallery ==
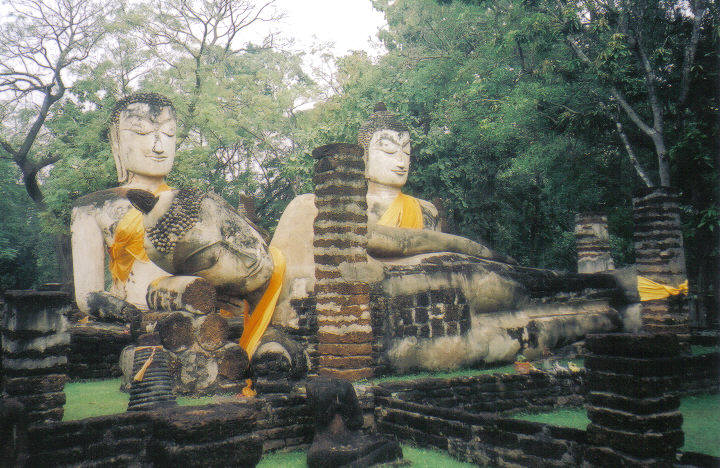
Reclining Buddha statue in Wat Phra Kaeo

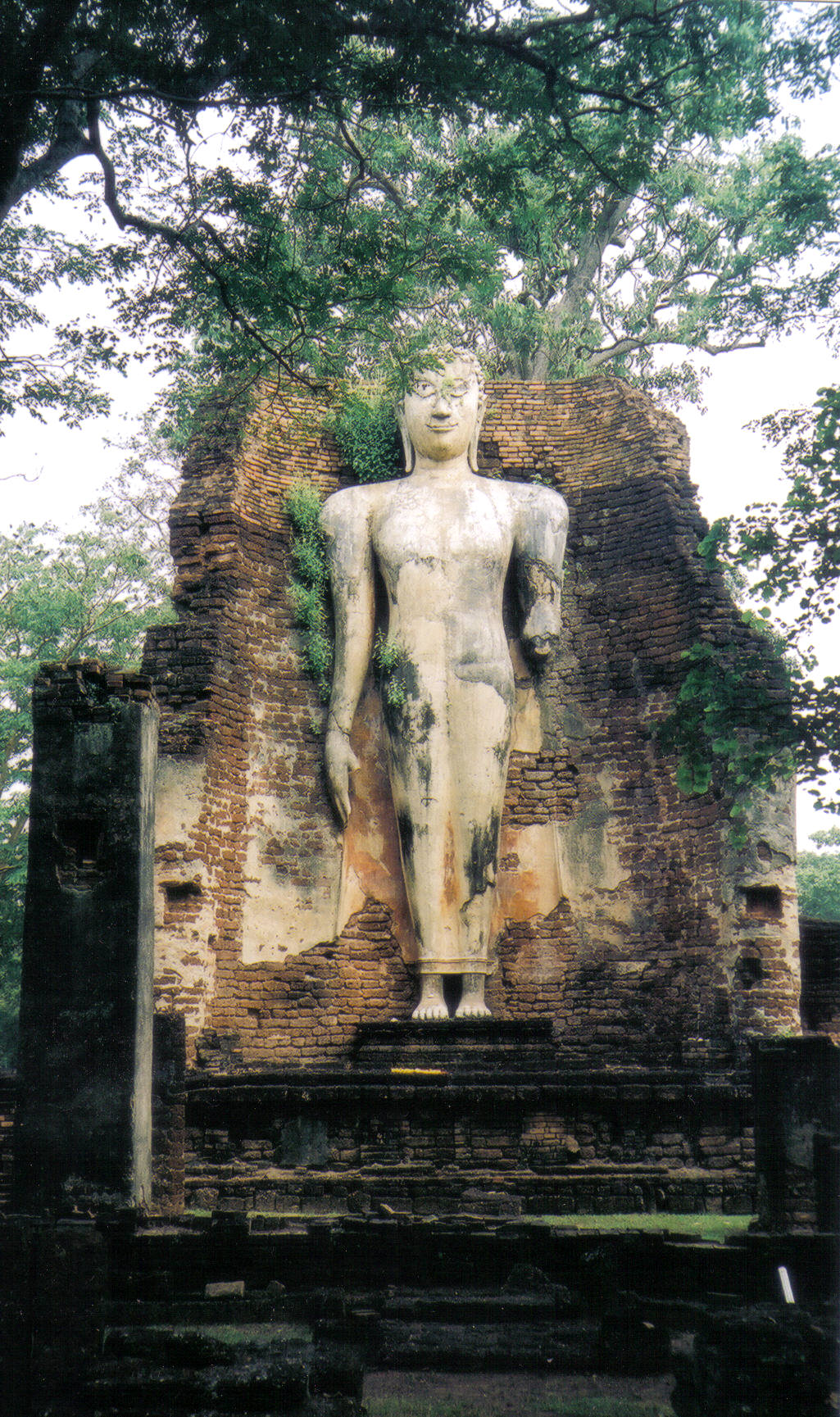
Wat Phra Si Iriyabot

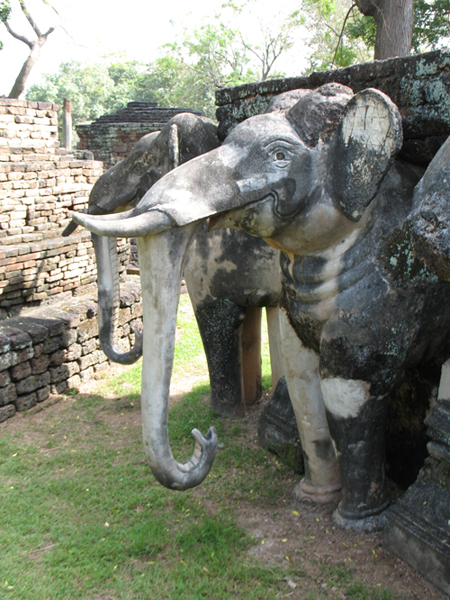
Elephants around chedi, Wat Phra Kaeo

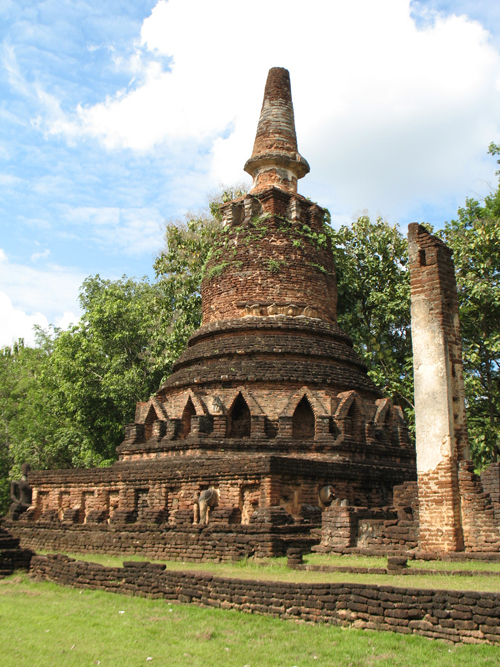
Chedi of Wat Phra Kaeo

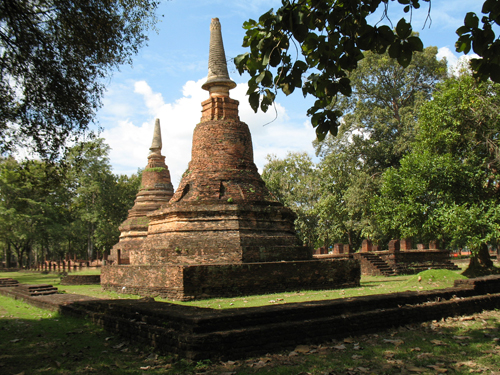
Wat Phra That

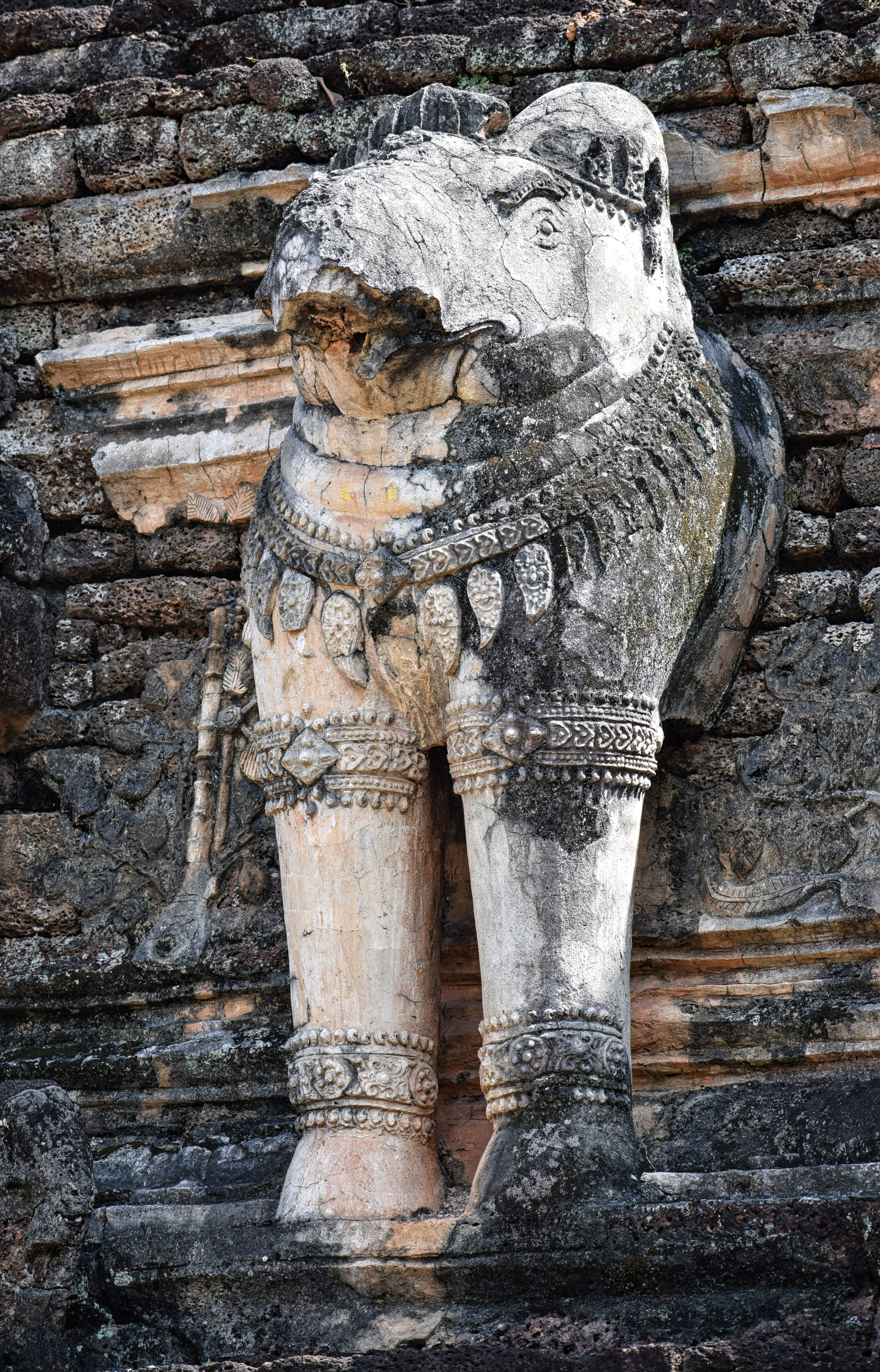
Wat Chang Rop, elephant
