= Si Satchanalai Historical Park =

UNESCO World Heritage Site
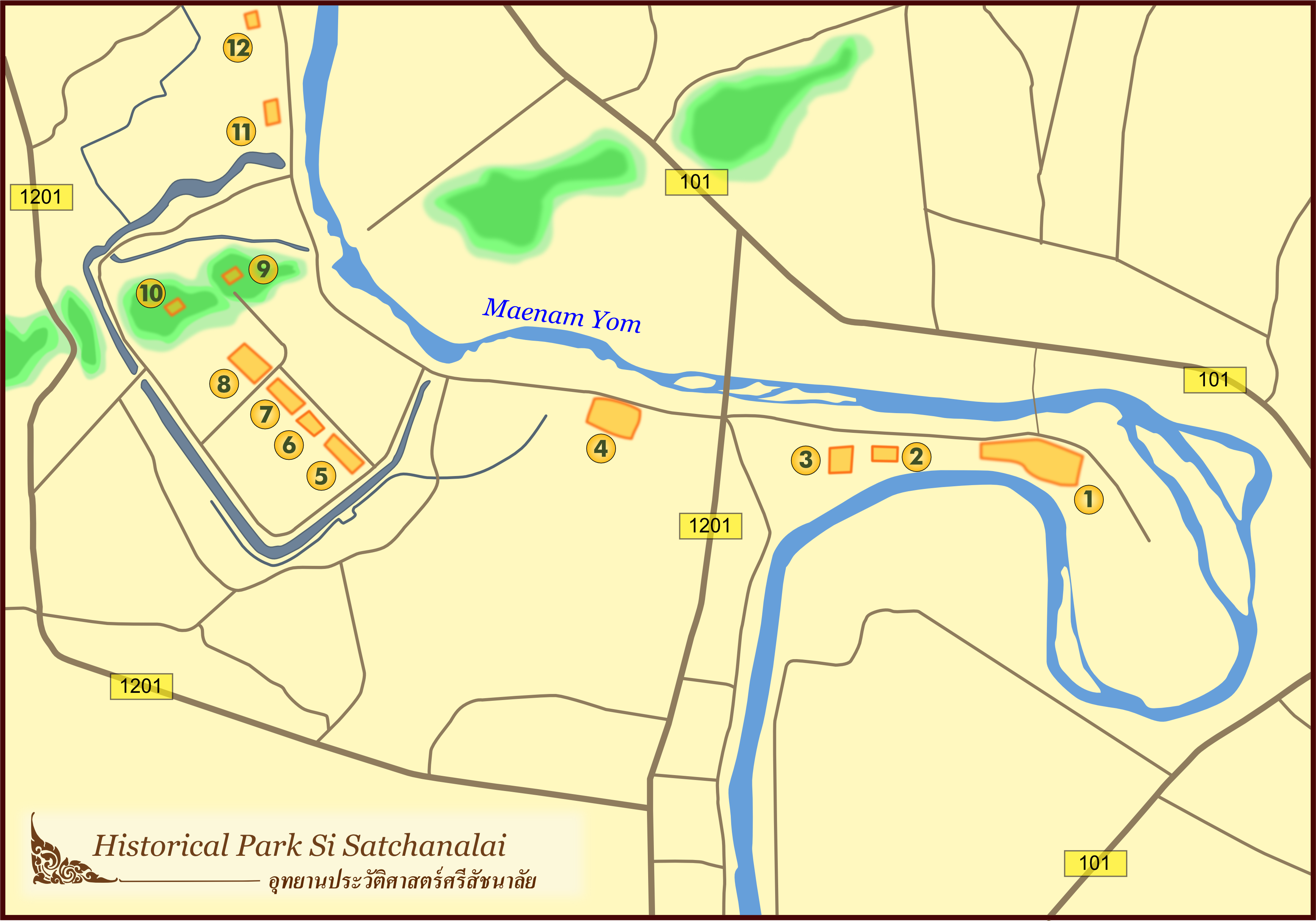

- Location within Thailand
- Location: Sukhothai Province, Thailand
- Part of: Historic Town of Sukhothai and Associated Historic Towns
- Criteria: Cultural: (i)(iii)
- Reference: 574-002
- Inscription: 1991 (15th Session)
- Area: 4,514 ha (11,150 acres)
- Coordinates: 17°31′26.2″N 99°47′11.5″E

The Si Satchanalai Historical Park (Thai: อุทยานประวัติศาสตร์ศรีสัชนาลัย) is a historical park in Si Satchanalai district, Sukhothai Province, northern Thailand. The park covers the ruins of Si Satchanalai and Chaliang. Si Satchanalai, which literally means "City of good people", was founded in 1250 as the second center of the Sukhothai Kingdom and as a residence of the crown prince in the 13th and 14th centuries.

The city was rectangular in shape. In the 16th century, a 5-metre high wall with an upstream moat was built to fend off the growing Burmese attacks. The location of the town was facilitated by two neighboring dominant hills. The park is maintained by the Fine Arts Department of Thailand with help from UNESCO, which has declared it a World Heritage Site together with the associated historic parks in Kamphaengphet and Sukhothai. Similar to Sukhothai Historical Park, Si Satchanalai Historical Park attracts thousands of visitors each year, who marvel at the ancient Buddha figures, palace buildings and ruined temples. The park is easily toured by bicycle or even on foot.

== History ==
=== Liberation from Khmer ===
Prior to the 13th century, Thai migrated into upper Chao Phraya valley and established a town named Chaliang (Thai: เมืองเชลียง), which means "City of Water" on the bank of the Yom River. Chaliang gradually developed into an important trade center between China and Khmer Empire. The Chinese called the town "Chengliang". The town enjoyed a substantial autonomy under Khmer until 1180, during the reign of Pho Khun Sri Naw Namthom who was the local ruler of Sukhothai and Sri Satchanalai, Khmer general Khomsabad Khlonlampong started to take control directly and introduced prohibitive taxes. In 1239 Pho Khun Bangklanghao and Pho Khun Pha Mueang decided to rebel and declare independence from Angkor and captured Chaliang. Chaliang then became part of the Sukhothai Kingdom.

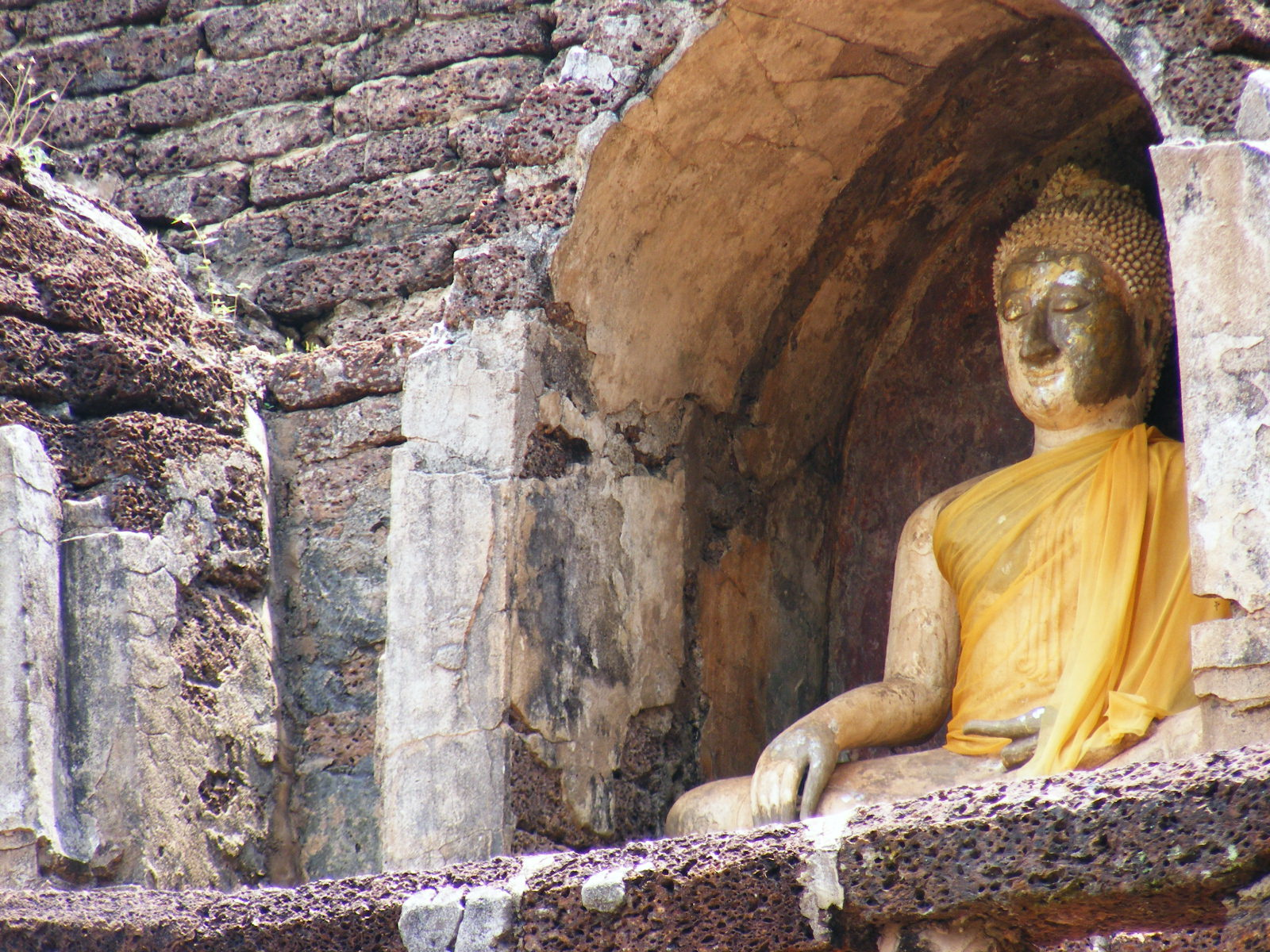
Wat Chang Lom, Si Satchanalai Historical Park

=== Under Sukhothai ===
Under the reign of Sri Indraditya, in 1250 the new town was built in the western area of Chaliang and named Si Satchanalai. Sri Indraditya sent his son, Ban Mueang, as crown prince to govern the town. When Ban Mueang ruled the kingdom, he gave his brother Ramkhamhaeng control of the town of Si Satchanalai, and it became a Sukhothai Kingdom's royal succession tradition to have a crown prince or heir of the throne to rule Si Satchanalai. The town had been granted the status of princely city (Thai: เมืองลูกหลวง) or inner provincial city (Thai: หัวเมืองชั้นใน) for its strategic location to the defense of kingdom capital in the northern direction, similar to Kamphaeng Phet in the west, Pitsanulok in the east, and Old Phichit in the south. There was a direct road from Sukhothai to Si Satchanalai called Phra Ruang Road (Thai: ถนนพระร่วง). In 1345 Luethai wrote one of greatest works in Thai literature, Traibhumikatha or Traiphum Phra Ruang (Thai: ไตรภูมิกถา หรือ ไตรภูมิพระร่วง) in Si Satchanalai.

The stele of Ram Khamhaeng states a stupa was erected in the center of Si Satchanalai, that took six years to build.

=== Lanna invasion and Ayutthaya domination ===
After the death of Ramkhamhaeng, Sukhothai Kingdom's dominance was reduced periodically, but unlike Sukhothai which suffered from urban decline, Si Satchanalai was still able to maintain its trading and industrial roles. In 1451, Tilokarat of Chiangmai annexed Si Satchanalai to his Lanna Kingdom and renamed the city to Chiangcheun (Thai: เชียงชื่น). In 1474, Trailokkanat of Ayutthaya started the Ayutthaya-Lanna War and recaptured the city and renamed it Sawankhalok (Thai: สวรรคโลก). During the reign of Ramathibodi II, the story of war campaigns between Tilokarat and Trailokkanat on Si Satchanalai inspired an unknown poet to write Lilit Yuan Phai (Thai: ลิลิตยวนพ่าย), which is considered one of the best poems of the Ayutthaya Kingdom. Si Satchanalai became the thriving center of porcelain production for the Ayutthayan court to export to overseas countries such as Philippines, Japan and Indonesia. This prosperous period started in the 13th century and continued until the 16th century. The city reached its pinnacle of economic and cultural development in the 14th century. In 1766 as part of Burmese–Siamese War (1765–67), the Burmese army from Lampang attacked Si Satchanalai and destroyed the city. After the war, the city was rebuilt in the new area of present-day Sawankhalok and the old city was abandoned.

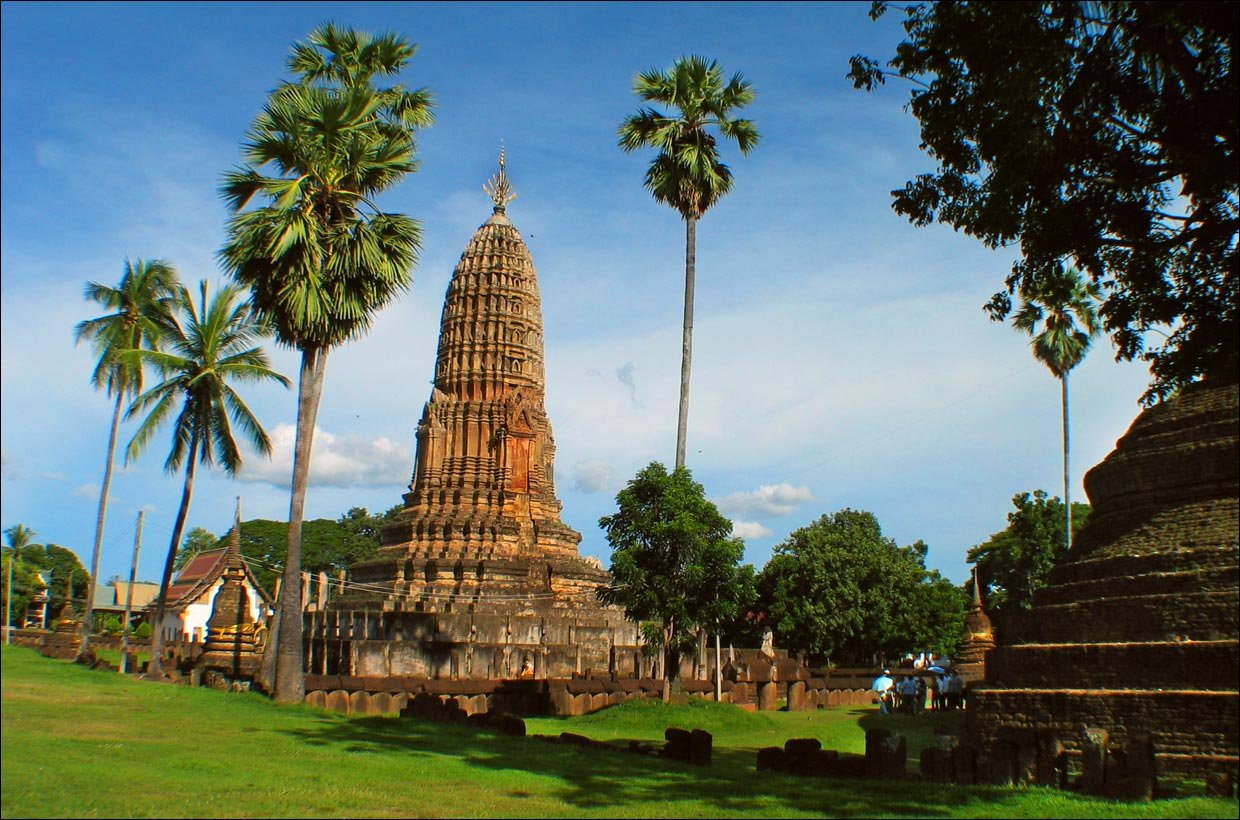
Wat Phra Si Ratana Mahathat, Chaliang

=== Later development ===
In 1907 Vajiravudh as a crown prince, made a two-month archaeological field trip to Nakhon Sawan, Kamphaeng Phet, Sukhothai, Si Satchanalai, Uttaradit and Pitsanulok. After returning to Bangkok, he published "Phra Ruang City Journey" (Thai: เที่ยวเมืองพระร่วง; RTGS: Thiao Muang Phra Ruang) to promote historical and archaeological study among the general public. The work has been used as structure by later archaeologists and historians including Damrong Rajanubhab, the founder of the modern Thai education system and George Coedès, a 20th-century scholar of southeast Asian archaeology and history. As part of this trip Vajiravudh found beautiful relics of Buddha image's head, a hand and feet in Si Satchanalai and brought them back to Bangkok. In 1911 he rebuilt the Buddha image which was finished in 1913. This 7.20 meters high standing Buddha image was named Phra Ruang Rojanarit Sri Indraditya Dhammobhas Mahavajiravudh Pujaneeya Bophitr (Thai: พระร่วงโรจนฤทธิ์ ศรีอินทราทิตย์ธรรโมภาส มหาวชิราวุธปูชนียบพิตร) and installed in the front of Phra Pathommachedi in Nakhon Pathom.

Bhumibol and Sirikit, king and queen of Thailand, visited old Si Satchanalai, Chaliang and Sawankhalok in 1958. The protection of the area was first announced in Volume 92, Part 112 of the Royal Gazette on August 2, 1961. In 1976 the restoration project was approved, and in July 1988 the park was officially opened. On December 12, 1991, it was declared a World Heritage Site as part of the Historic Town of Sukhothai and Associated Historic Towns together with the associated historical parks in Kamphaeng Phet and Sukhothai.

During 2011 Thailand floods, flood water from Yom River entered Si Satchanalai Historical Park inundating two historical pottery kilns.

== Main sights ==
=== Wat Phra Si Ratana Mahathat ===
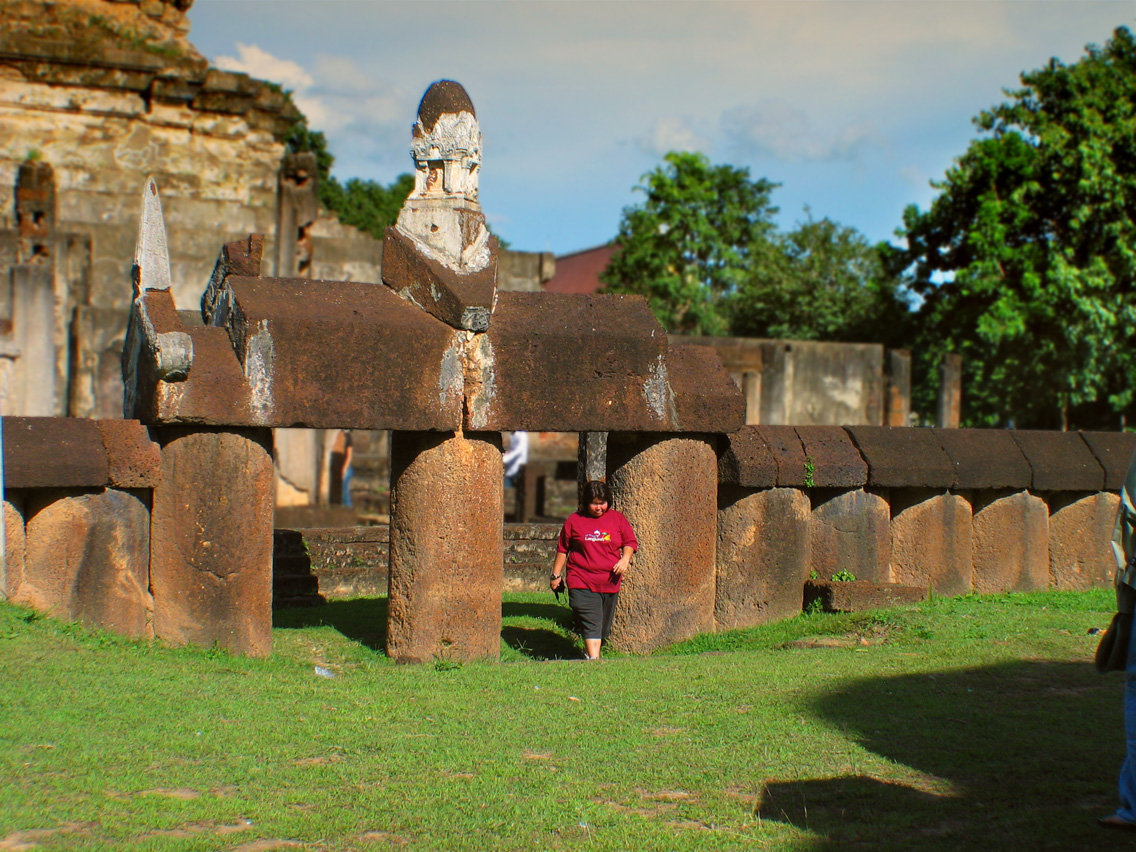
Wat Phra Si Ratana Mahathat, Chaliang

Wat Phra Si Ratana Mahathat or Wat Si Mahathat Chaliang (Thai: วัดพระศรีรัตนมหาธาตุ หรือ วัดศรีมหาธาตุเชลียง) is the biggest and the most important historic temple in Si Satchanalai - Chaliang. The temple was built as a Mahayana Buddhist temple in the late 12th century during the reign of Jayavarman VII when Chaliang was part of his Khmer Empire. The main structure is the impressive prang, in a Thai-adopted Khmer style gopura. The original design of the prang is believed to be Bayon styled, but when Chaliang was under the Ayutthaya Kingdom, the prang was redesigned to the current form of Ayutthayan style by Borommakot in the 18th century. The temple compound is surrounded by thick high laterite wall. The vihara has a big Buddha image, framed with high laterite columns. The temple gate was decorated with unique Brahma head in four directions and Apsara bas-reliefs. On the left side of the prang is a Sukhothai styled walking Buddha image. Behind the prang has well-preserved mandapa, a standing Buddha image and the ruin of Mon-styled stupa as well as many smaller Sri Lanka-styled stupas. The importance of the temple during Sukhothai Kingdom was recorded in the Ramkhamhaeng stele, and many historical records during Ayutthaya, Thonburi and Rattanakosin Kingdom. In 1958 after Bhumibol and Sirikit visited the temple, Wat Phra Si Ratana Mahataht was promoted as the first rank Ratchawarawihan or royal temple and put under the patronage of the Thai royal family.

=== Wat Chedi Chet Thaeo ===
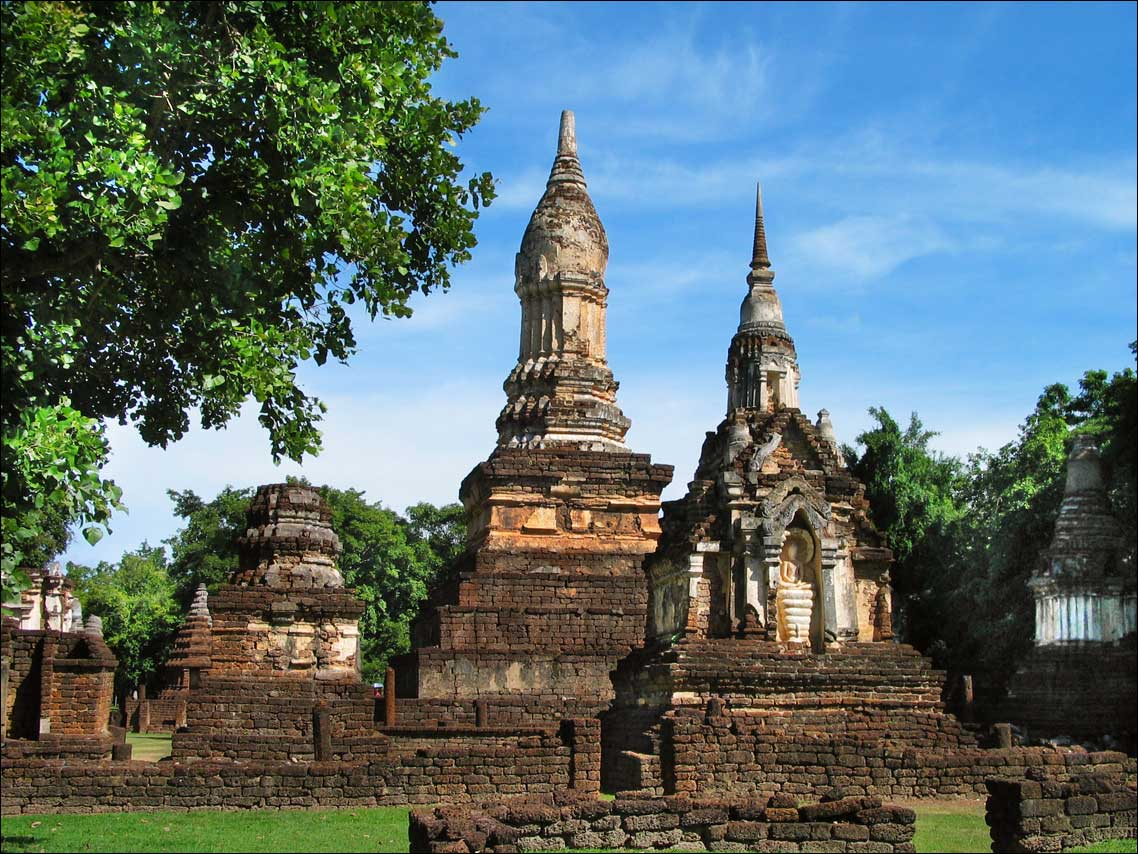
Wat Chedi Chet Thaeo

Wat Chedi Chet Thaeo (Thai: วัดเจดีย์เจ็ดแถว) means the temple of seven rows of stupa. The temple is one of the most important historic sites inside the town wall of Si Satchanalai. The temple is located in front of Wat Chang Lom and is considered unique among the temples in Sukhothai Kingdom, because it consists of 32 stupas of different sizes in different styles. The gigantic size of the temple in the town center indicates that this temple was built for the royal family. Vajiravudh wrote in his Phra Ruang City Journey that a local claimed that the temple was once called Wat Kalayanimit and was built by a daughter of Lithai. Damrong Rajanubhab believed that the temple was the burial place for the ruling family of Si Satchanalai. Pattern of Stupas at Wat Chedi Chet Thaeo are influenced by various artistic styles such as Sri Lanka, Lanna and Bagan stupa which has unique square tower base with a spherical top and arched hall façade stucco for standing Buddha image in beautiful Sukhothai style. Inside the temple, there were vihara, ordination hall, five mandapas and a sacred pond. There was also a defensive wall around the temple which was originally surrounded by a moat.

=== Wat Chang Lom ===
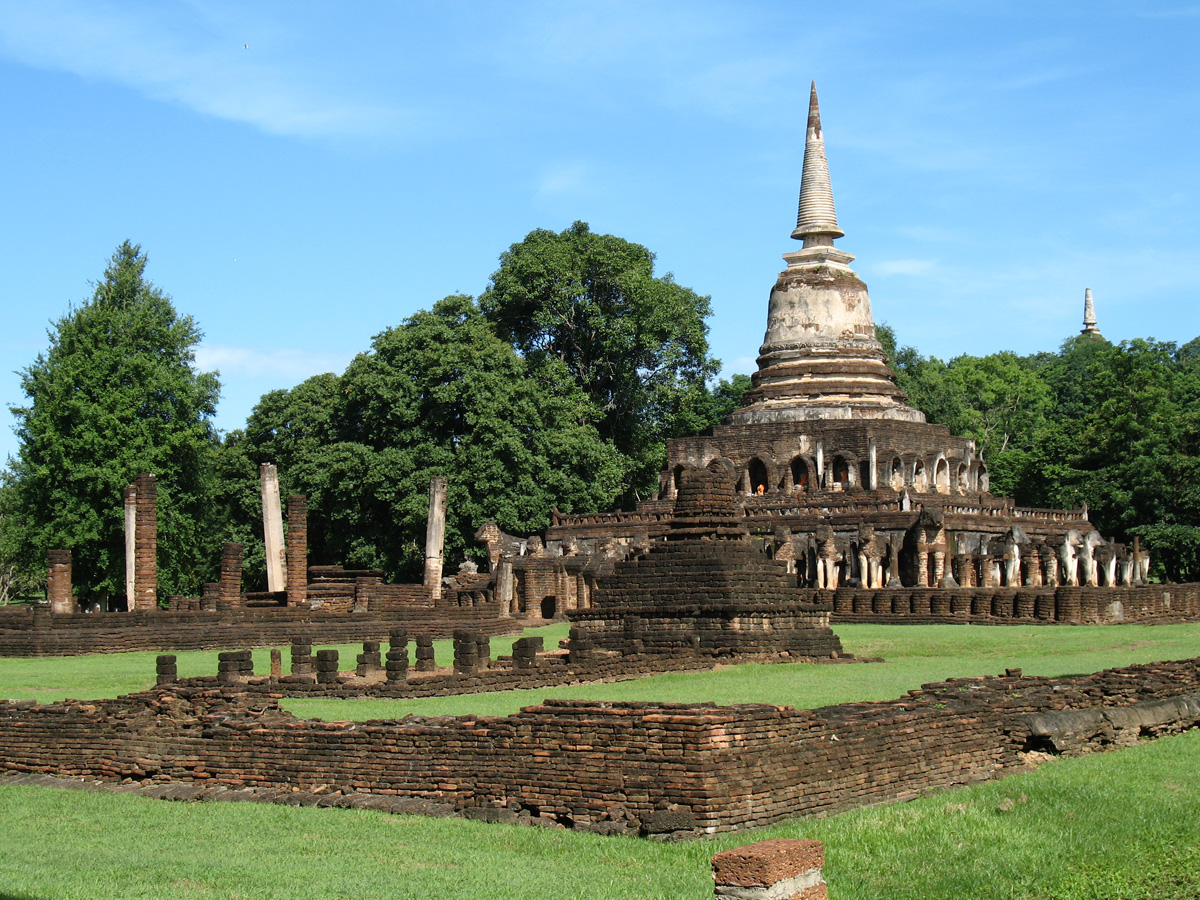
Wat Chang Lom

Wat Chang Lom (Thai: วัดช้างล้อม) was built in 1286 by order of Ramkhamhaeng after the discovery of a Buddha relic on the site. The main structure of the temple is a two-tiered square base round the Sri Lanka-style laterite stupa. The name of the temple come from the statues of 39 standing elephants around the first tier of the stupa base. The elephants are remarkably full sized in front of the wall. Normally only the front half of the body is shown as in Wat Chang Rop and Wat Chang Lom in Sukhothai Historical Park. Also on the second tier of the stupa base are 20 niches that were originally filled with 1.4 m high Buddha images. Some Buddha images can still be seen today. There is a ruined vihara in front of the stupa as well as other smaller structures in the temple compound. The main sanctuary is surrounded by a thick wall made of laterite stones.

=== Wat Chom Chuen ===
Wat Chom Chuen (Thai: วัดชมชื่น) is located near Wat Phra Si Ratana Mahathat. On the temple ground, there are a vihara, a circular laterite stupa, and a mandapa. The mandapa has laterite gable roofing and 2 niches in the front and another niche at the back. From the archaeological excavations conducted at the depth of 7 – 8 metres in front of vihara, 15 skeletons were found. These human skeletons are believed to date from near the 4th century - Dvaravati period, around the 7th to 11th centuries.

=== Wat Khok Singkharam ===
Wat Khok Singkharam (Thai: วัดโคกสิงคาราม) is an ancient temple built during late Sukhothai to early Ayutthaya. The temple is facing east and has rectangular layout. The northern, eastern and western walls of the temple are made from laterite. The southern wall of the temple is the old town wall of Chaliang. There is an early Ayutthayan 6-roomed laterite vihara. Behind the vihara are three Sukhothai stupas on a single pedestal, originally separate but later connected.

=== Wat Nang Paya ===
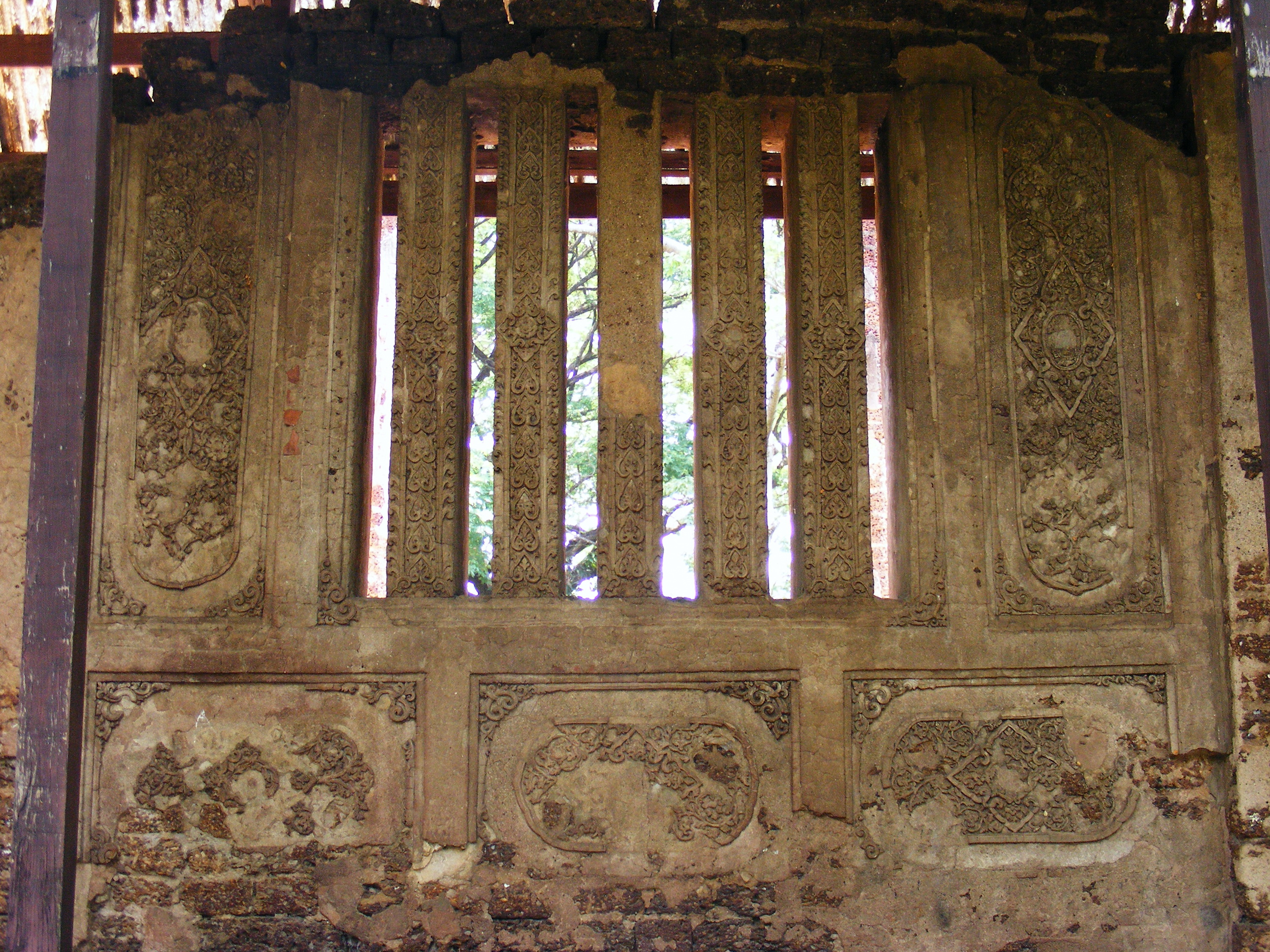
Wat Nang Paya

Wat Nang Paya (Thai: วัดนางพญา) means the temple of queen. In Phra Ruang City Journey, Vajiravudh reported that, according to local legend, the temple was built by Pasuja Devi, a daughter of the Emperor of China; however, there is no archaeological evidence to support such a legend. The temple ground is fairly extensive. There is a large laterite stupa and remains of a seven-roomed vihara, in the typical style of Sukhothai and Lanna architecture, in the center of the compound. The temple is famous for the remains of beautiful stucco-reliefs on the wall of the Vihara. The stucco-reliefs are protected under the tin roof shelter.

=== Thuriang Kilns ===
The Thuriang Kilns (Thai: เตาทุเรียง) are ruins of the old celadon factory, located about 5 km north of the old town of Si Satchanalai. In an area of about 1.5 square kilometers about 200 kilns have been found. This is a site where Sukhothai celadons were produced since the 13th century, they are probably the oldest kilns in Thailand. The vaulted brick kilns measure 1.5 – 2 metres wide and 4.5 metres long. The ceramic wares found here are generally large bowls and jars; they have a matt yellowish grey glaze and a design, usually of a flower, a fish, or a whirling circle, painted in black in Chinese designs. A group of Thai-Australian archaeologists from University of Adelaide found that the ceramic wares in Si Satchanalai had been produced more than a millennium before the Sukhothai Kingdom contradicting the general view that the Chinese introduced production in the 13th century.

== Gallery ==
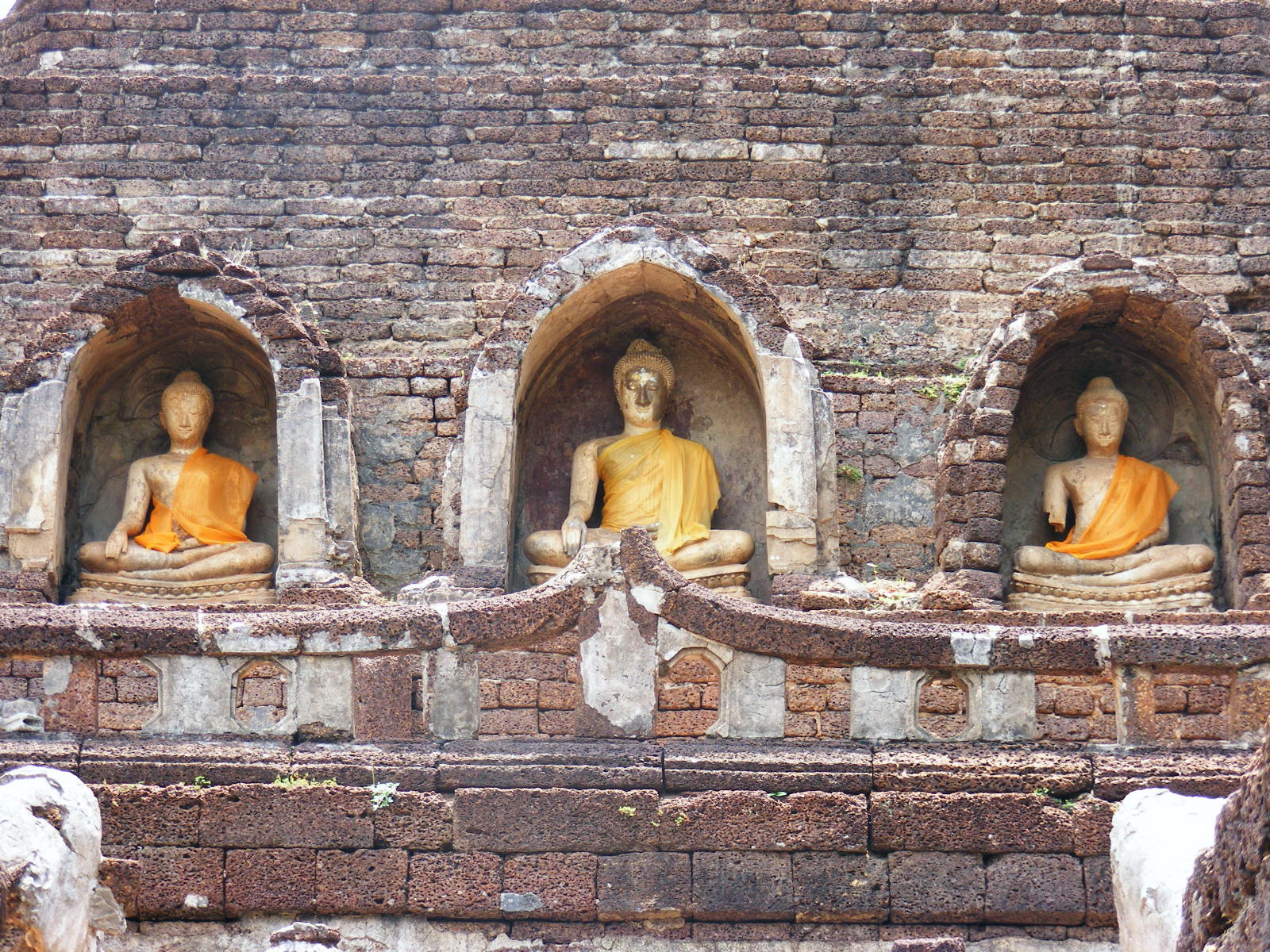
Wat Chang Lom

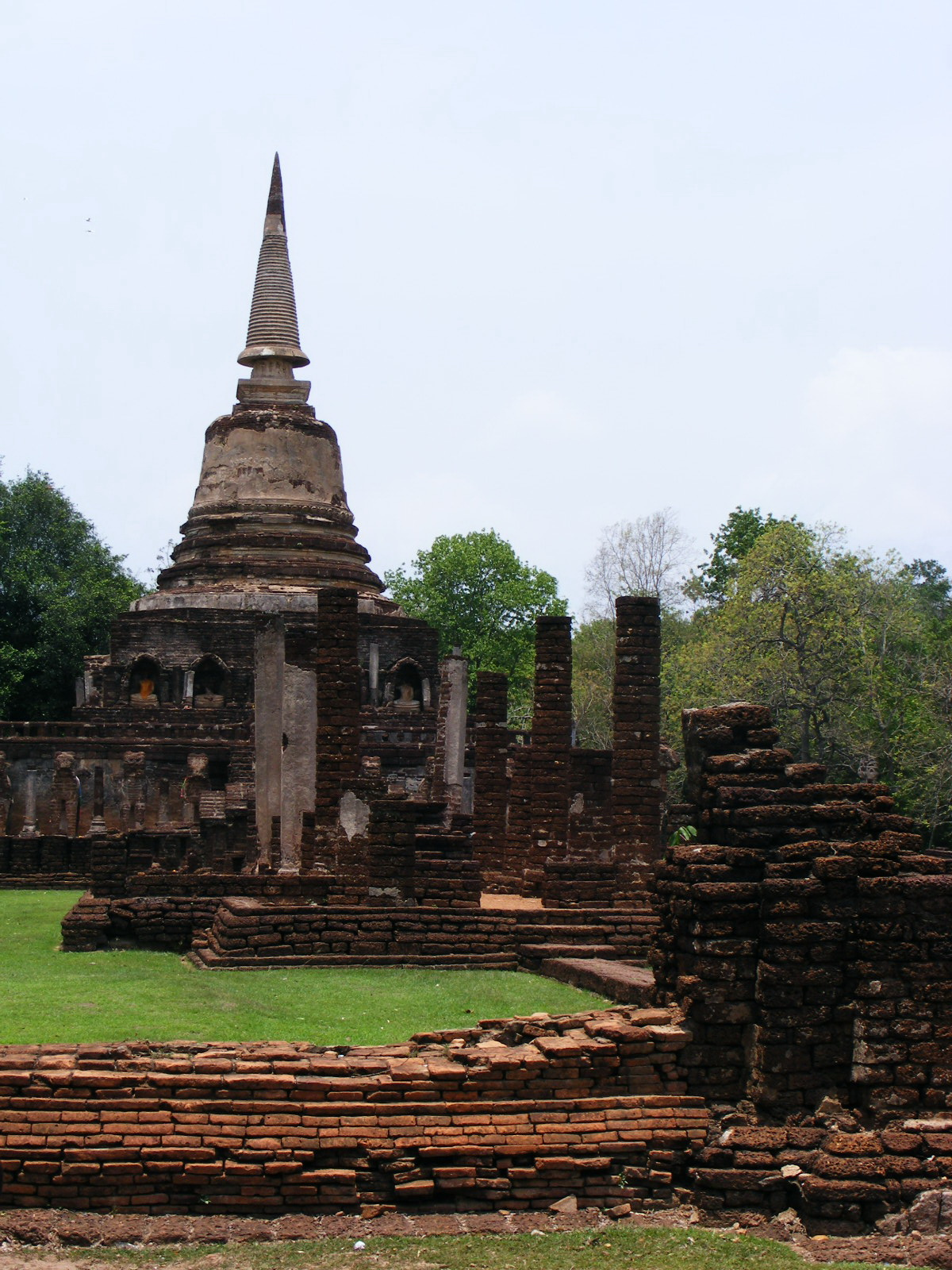
Wat Chang Lom

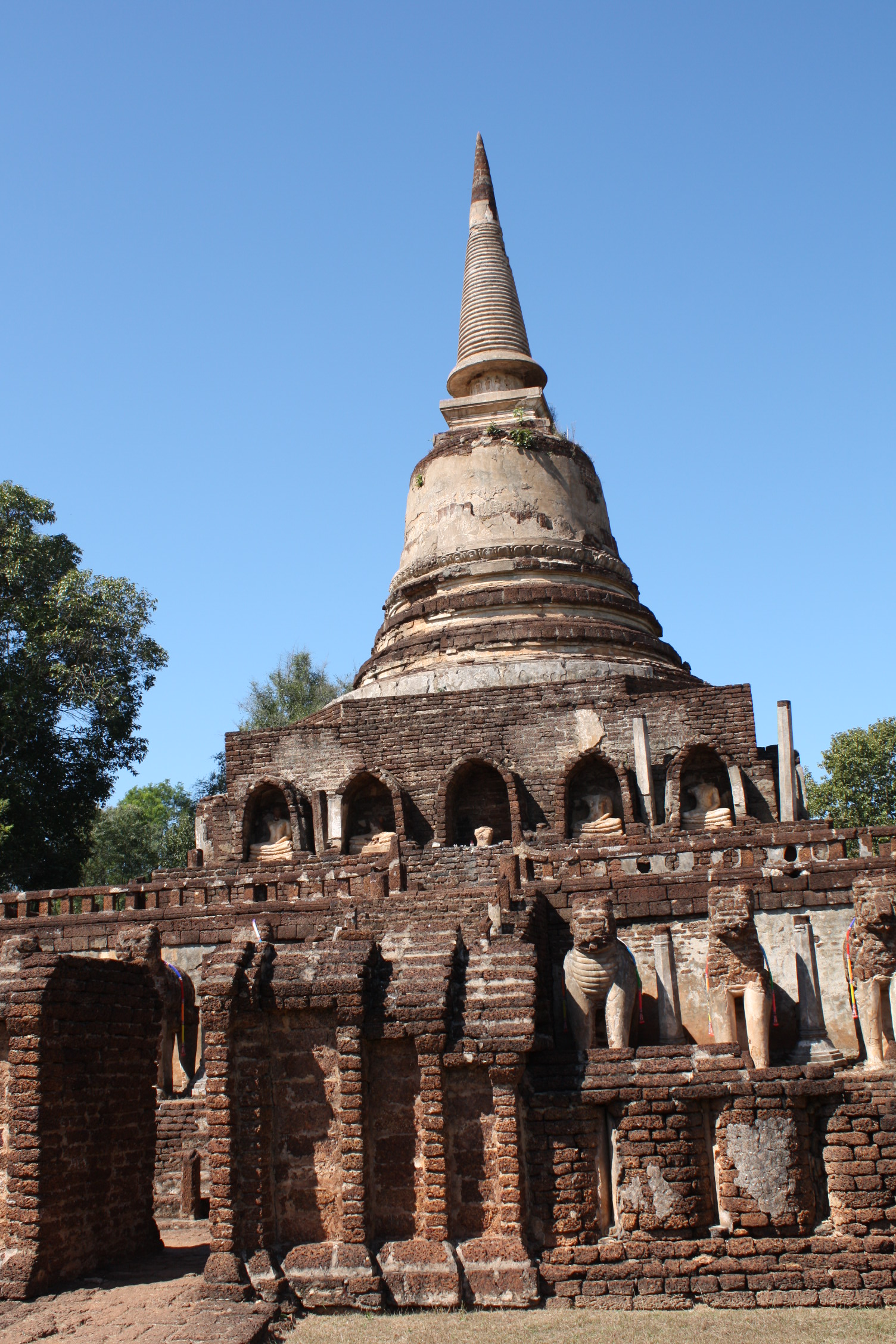
Wat Chang Lom

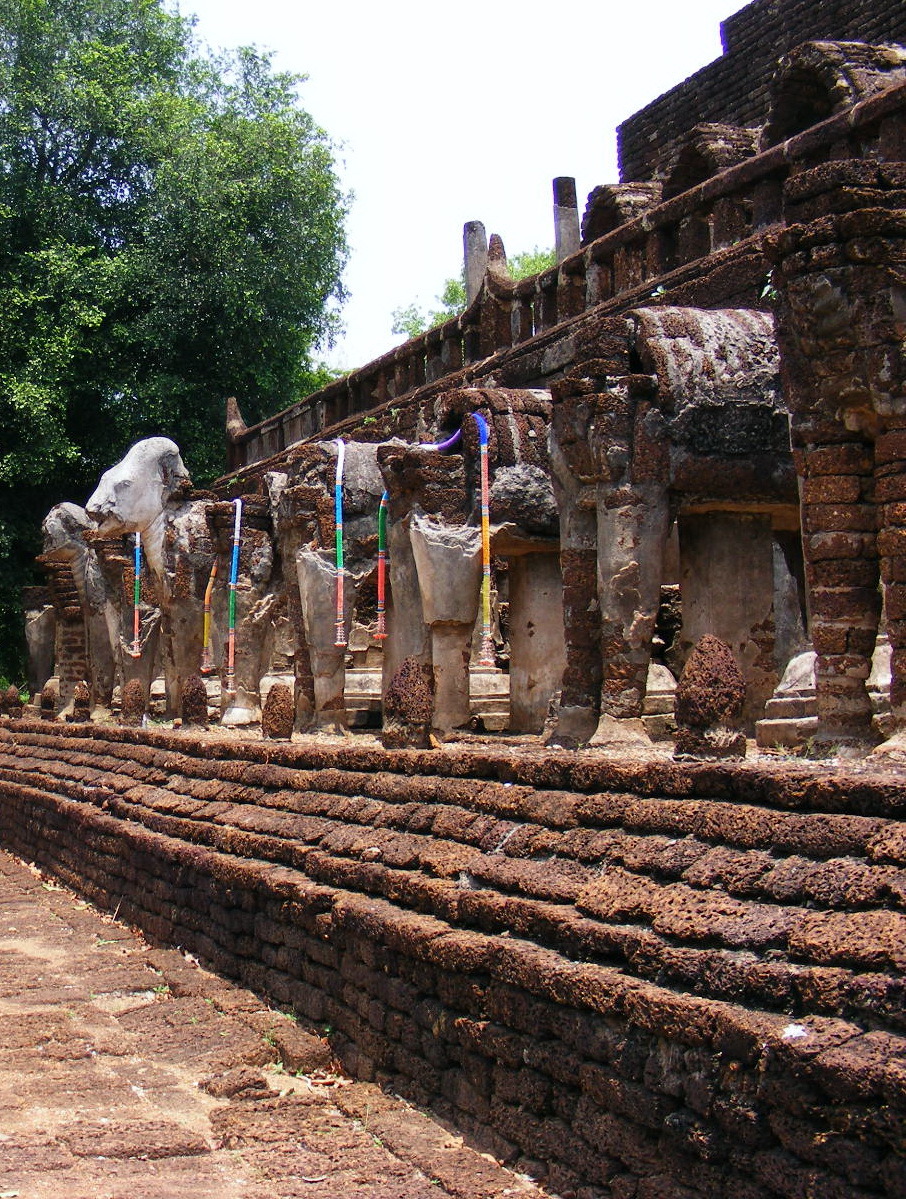
Wat Chang Lom

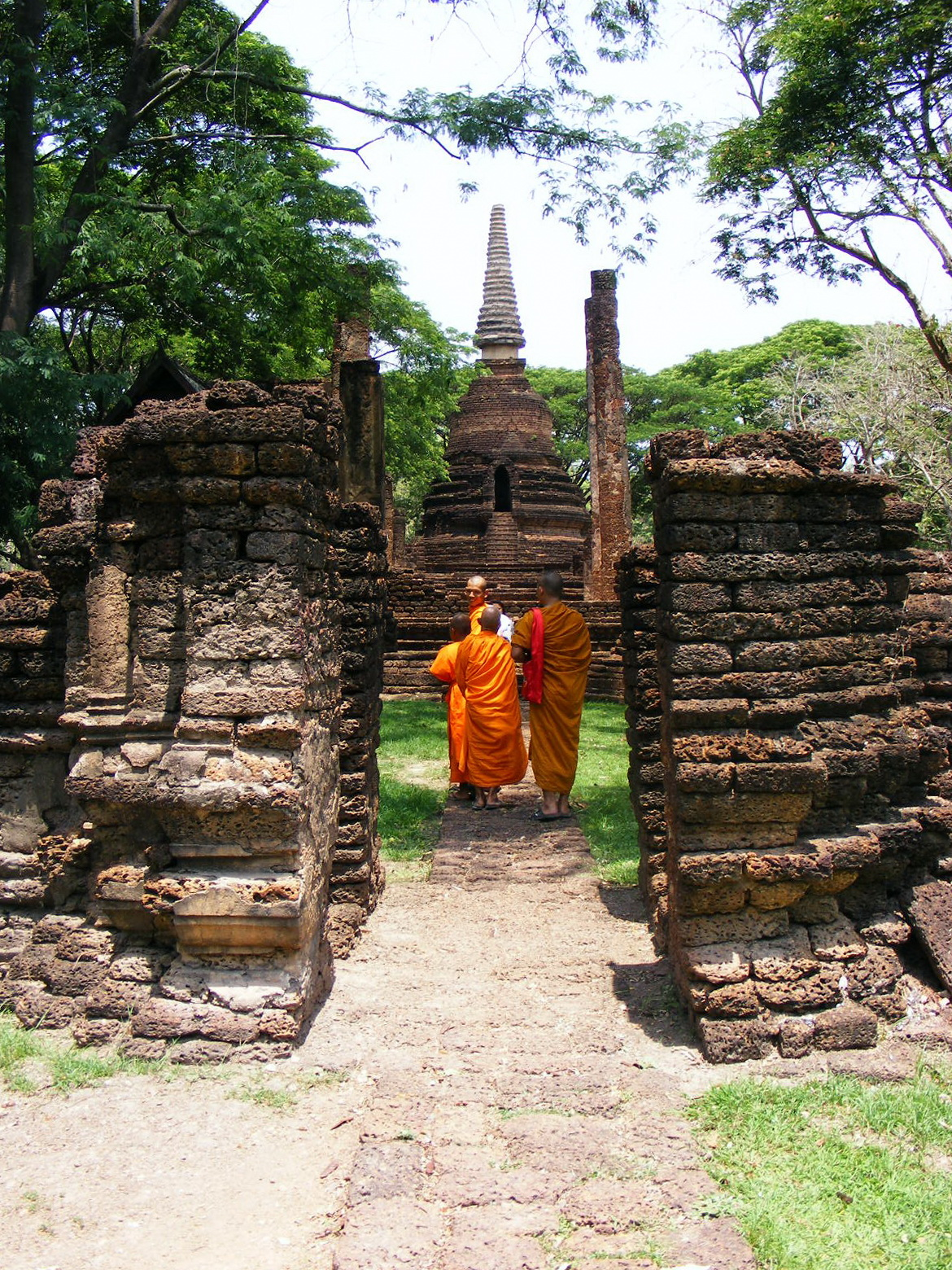
Wat Nang Paya

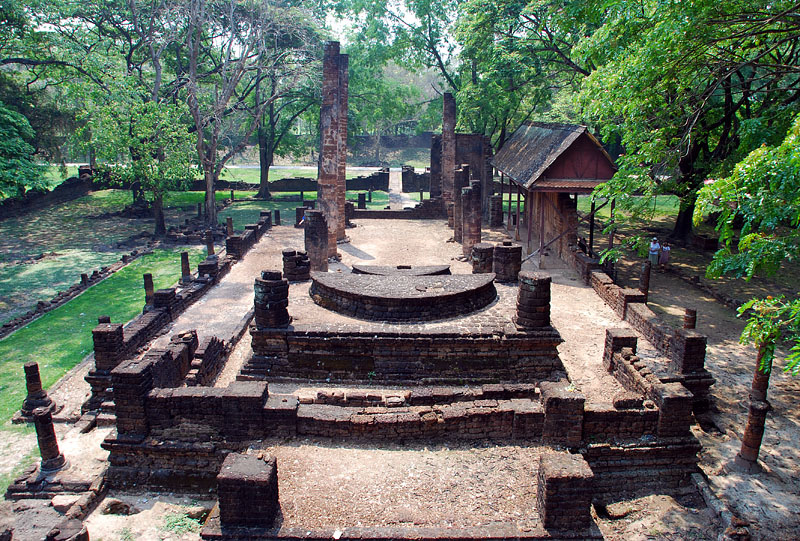
Wat Nang Paya

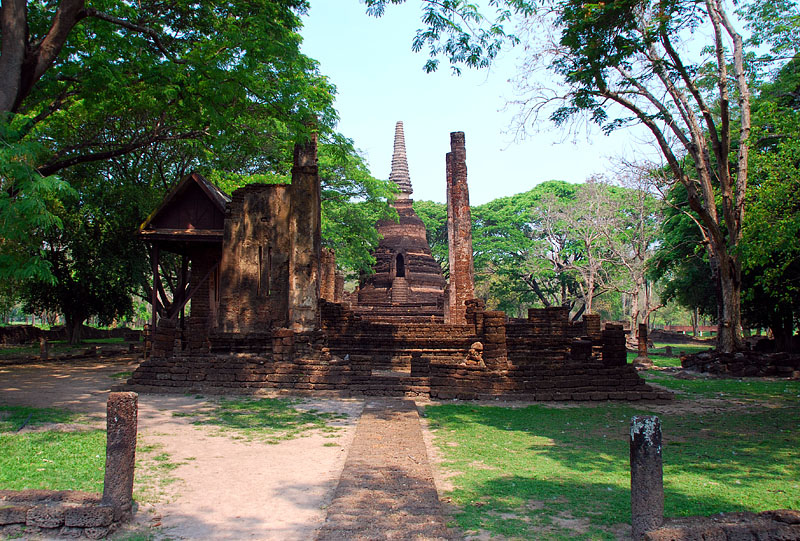
Wat Nang Paya

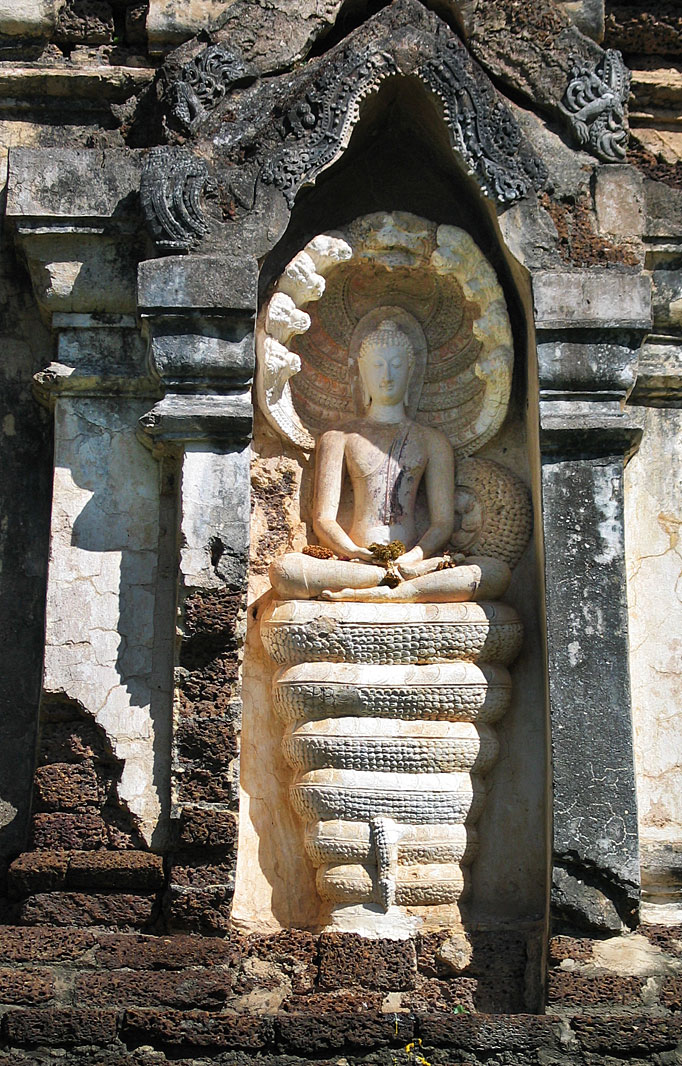
Wat Chedi Chet Thaeo

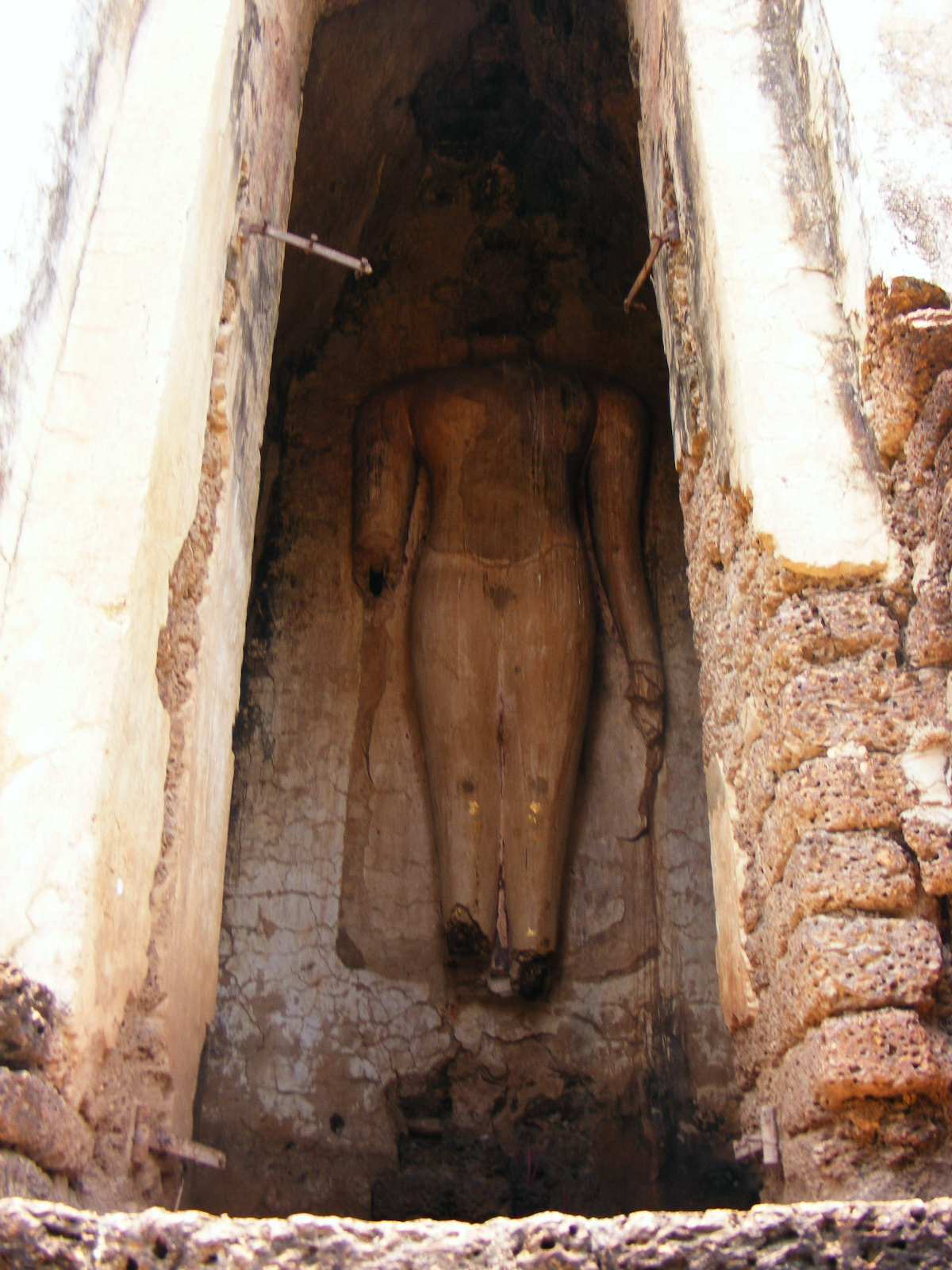
Wat Chedi Chet Thaeo

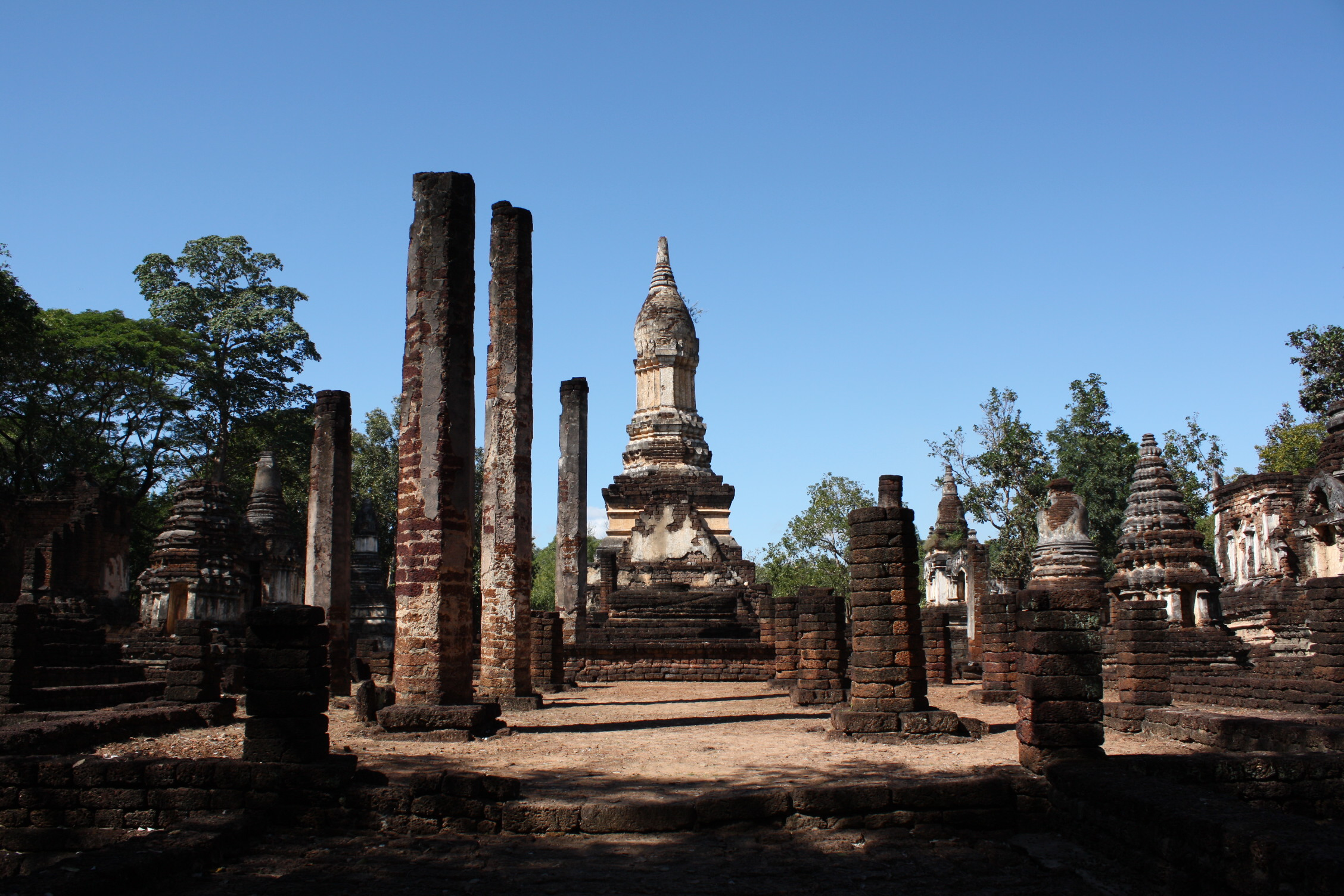
Wat Chedi Chet Thaeo

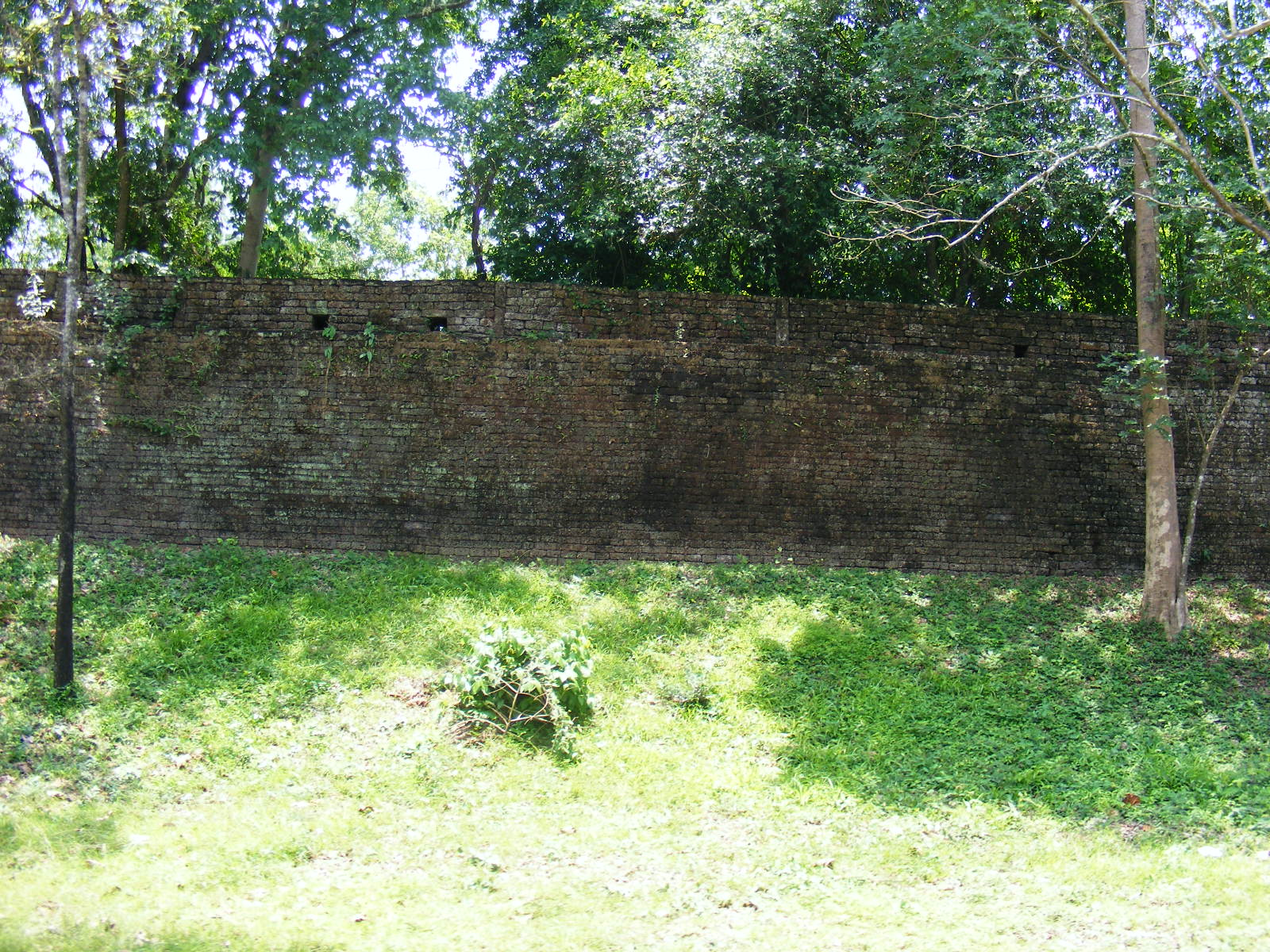
Town Wall

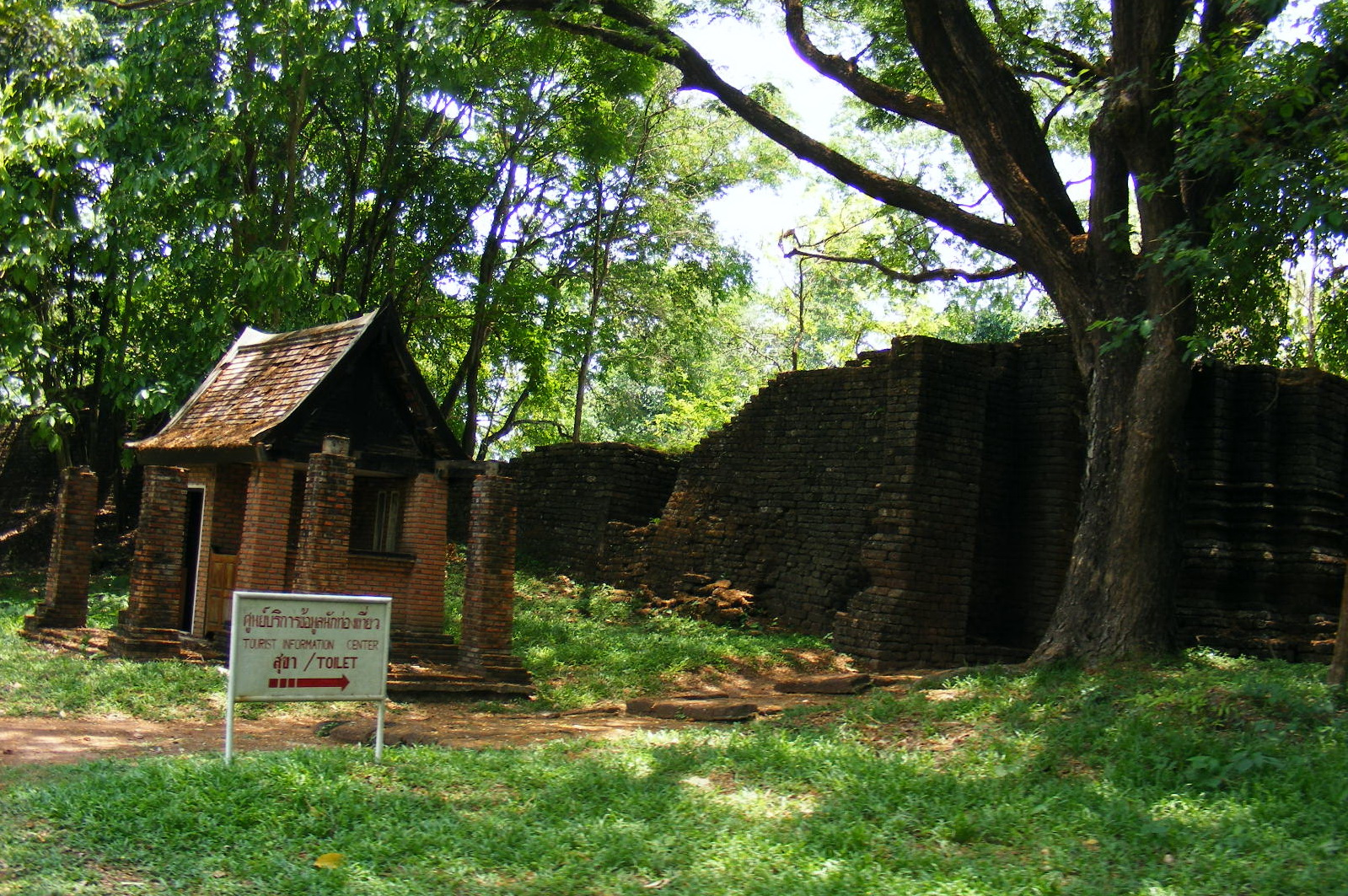
Town Wall

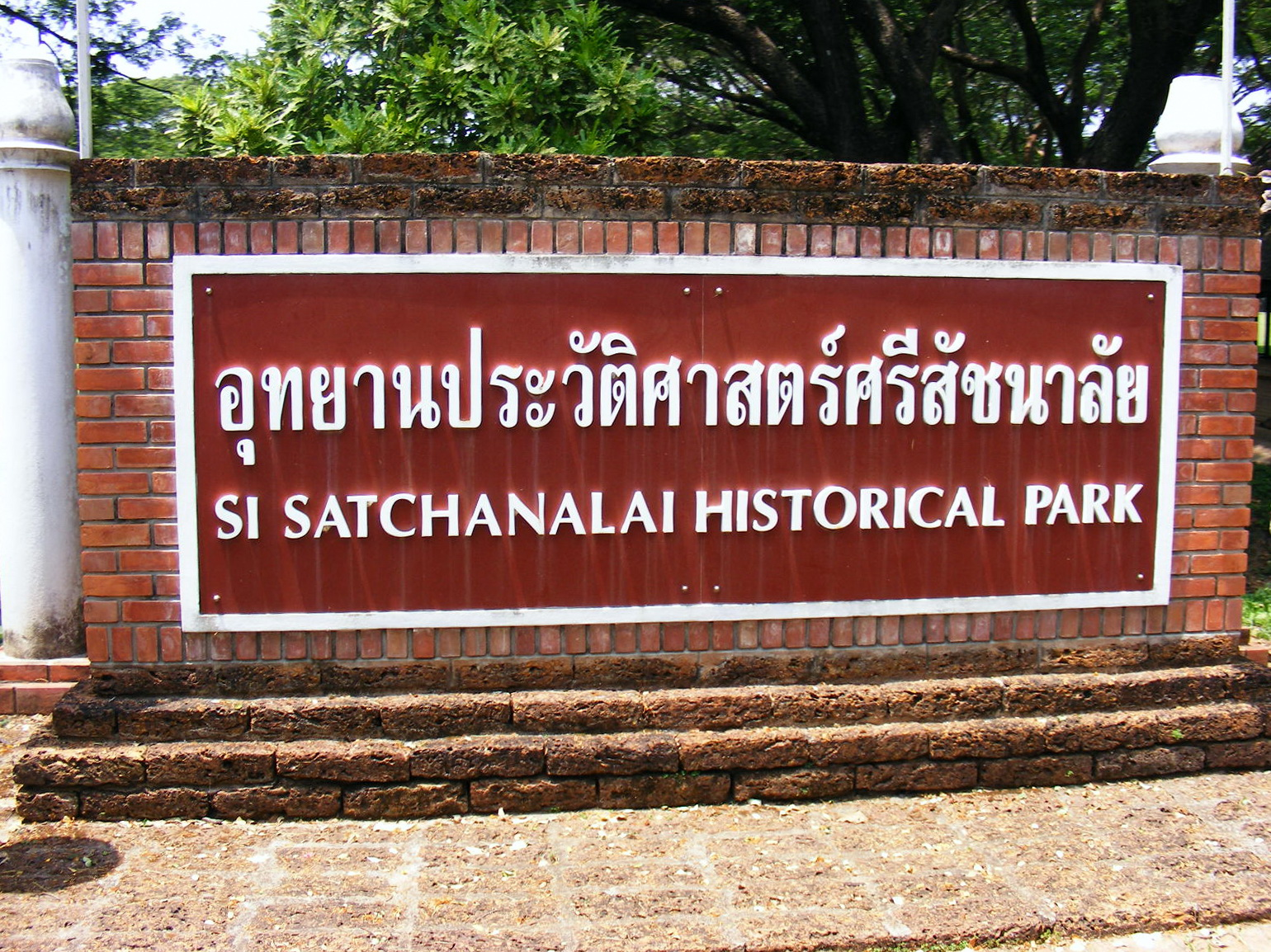
Historical Park Entrance

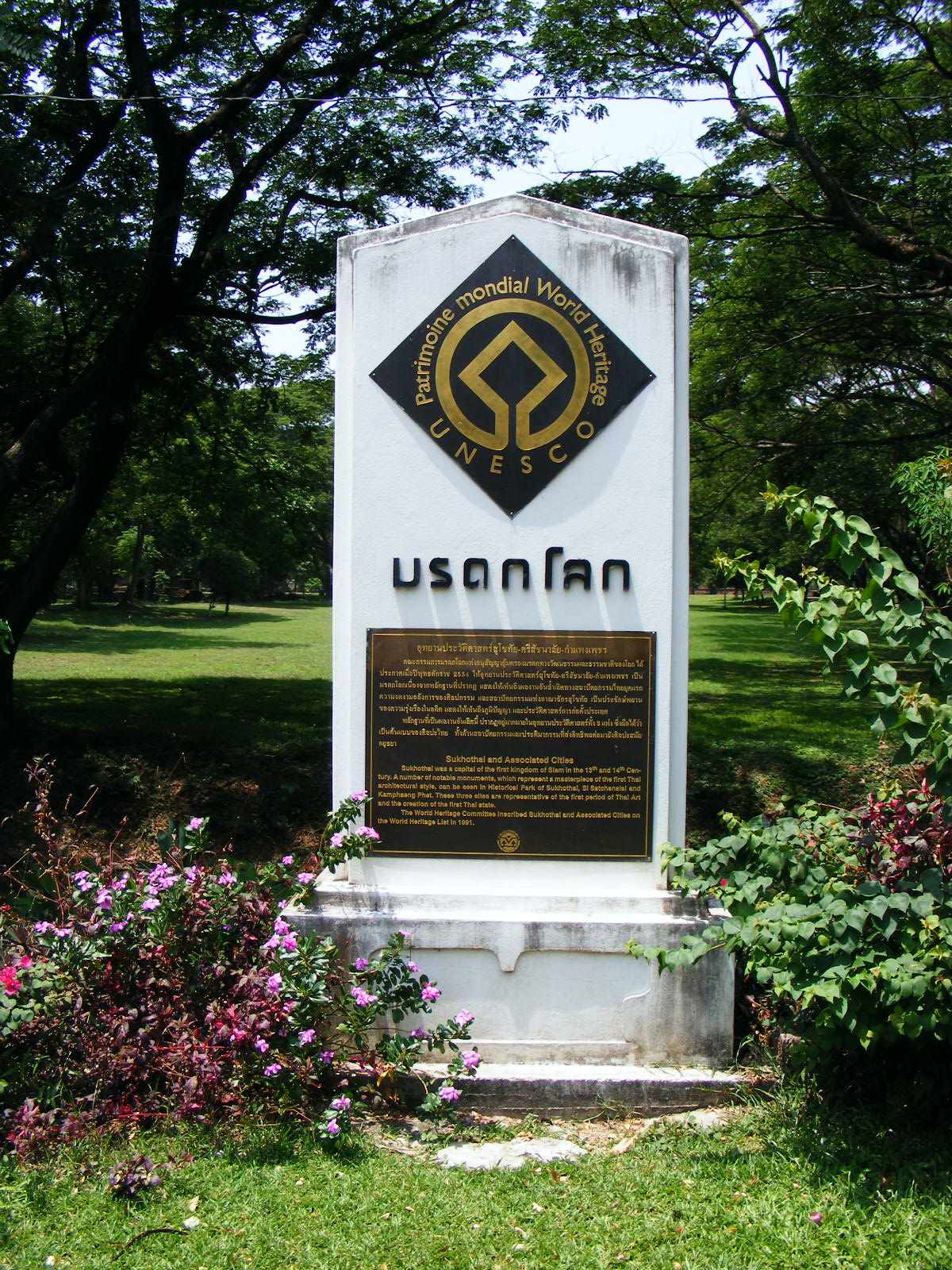
UNESCO World Heritage Site

== See also ==
- Sukhothai Kingdom
- Sukhothai province
- History of Thailand
- Ayutthaya Historical Park
- Si Thep Historical Park
- Phu Phra Bat Historical Park
- Ban Chiang
- List of World Heritage Sites in Thailand
