= Bangkok National Museum =

Museum in Thailand

Coordinates: 13°45′27″N 100°29′32″E

National Museum, Bangkok
- พิพิธภัณฑสถานแห่งชาติ พระนคร
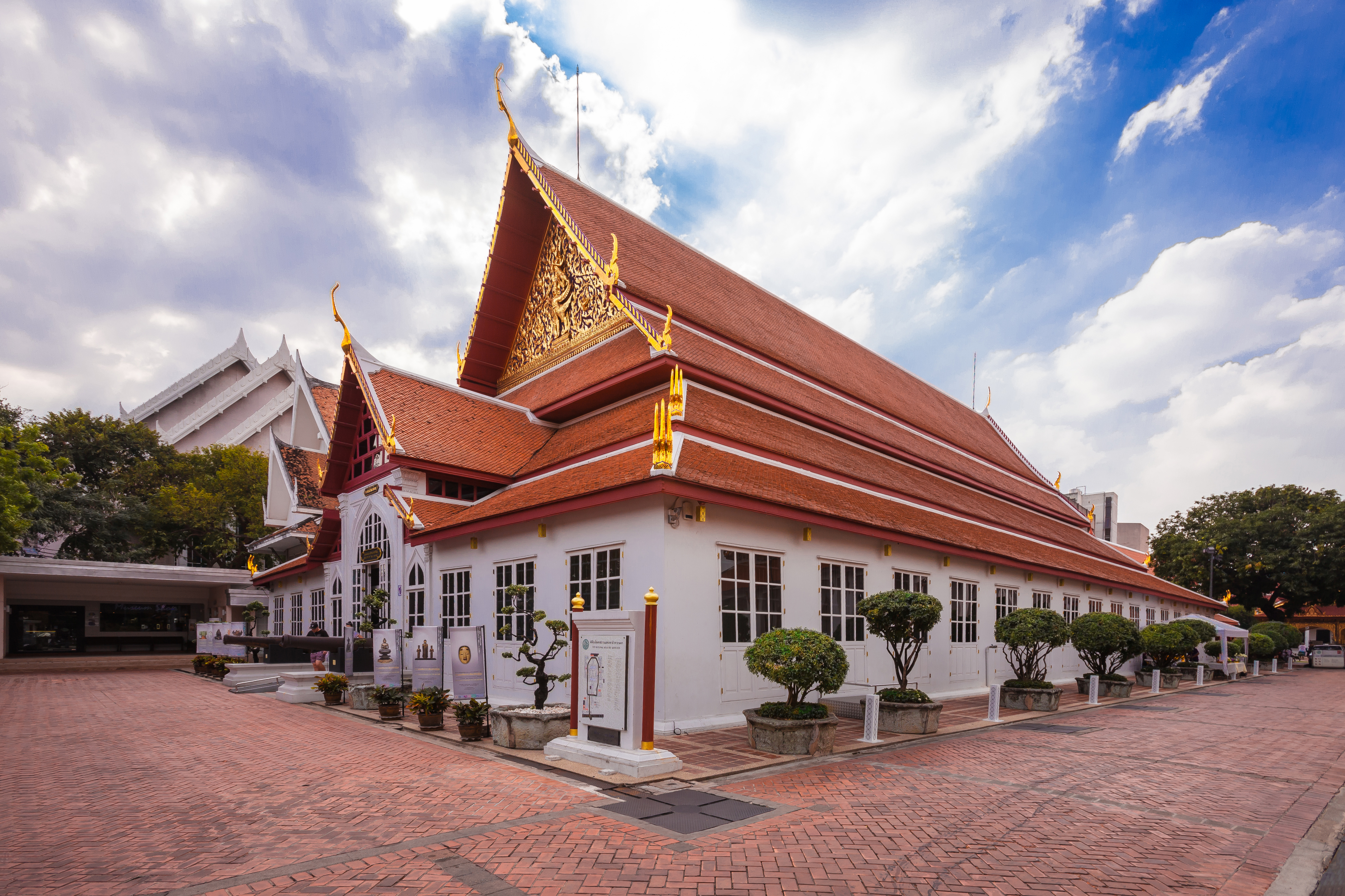
- Siwamok Phiman Hall
- Established: 19 September 1874
- Location: 4 Na Phra That Road, Phra Borom Maha Ratchawang Subdistrict, Phra Nakhon District, Bangkok 10200
- Key holdings: Thai history
- Director: Nitaya Kanokmongkol
- Website: finearts.go.th/museumbangkok/

The Bangkok National Museum (Thai: พิพิธภัณฑสถานแห่งชาติ พระนคร, RTGS: Phiphitthaphanthasathan Haeng Chat Phra Nakhon) is the main branch museum of the National museums in Thailand and also one of the largest museums in Southeast Asia. It features exhibits of Thai art and history. It occupies the former palace of the vice king (Wang Na), set between Thammasat University and the National Theater, facing Sanam Luang.

The museum was established and opened in 1874 by King Chulalongkorn to exhibit the royal collections of his father King Mongkut. Today the galleries contain exhibits covering the Thai History back to Neolithic times. The collection includes The King Ramkhamhaeng's Inscription, which was inscribed on UNESCO's Memory of the World Programme registered in 2003 in recognition of its significance.

Other than preserving and displaying Thai artifacts dating from the Dvaravati, Srivijaya, to Sukhothai and Ayutthaya periods, the museum also displays extensive collections of regional Asian Buddhist arts such as Gandhara, Tang, Cham, Java, and Khmer arts.

As of April 2019, the museum is nearing the end of a decade-long renovation of its exhibition rooms. Twelve halls have been revamped already. Four more halls will be renovated over the next three years. All will receive new interiors, better lighting, and computer-aided multimedia displays.

== History ==
Bangkok National Museum was originally established by King Chulalongkorn around the collection of antiquities of his father King Mongkut. The National Museum is on the grounds of the former Wang Na, the "Front Palace" which was built for the vice king, a sort of crown prince (Thailand has no law of primogeniture. The king traditionally named his own successor, who was often his brother rather than his son). The post was eliminated by Chulalongkorn and the National Museum was set up in the former palace in 1887.

In 1874, Chulalongkorn ordered the establishment of the first public museum at the Concordia Pavilion inside the Grand Palace to exhibit the collections of his father and other objects of general interest. The Concordia Museum was opened on 19 September 1874, and the Fine Arts Department has marked that day as the birth of the first national museum of Thailand.

In 1887, Chulalongkorn ordered the museum moved from Concordia to the Front Palace, and called it Wang Na Museum ("Front Palace Museum").

In 1926, it was named the "Bangkok Museum" and subsequently developed into the Bangkok National Museum, when it came under the direction of the Fine Arts Department in 1934.

== Collections ==
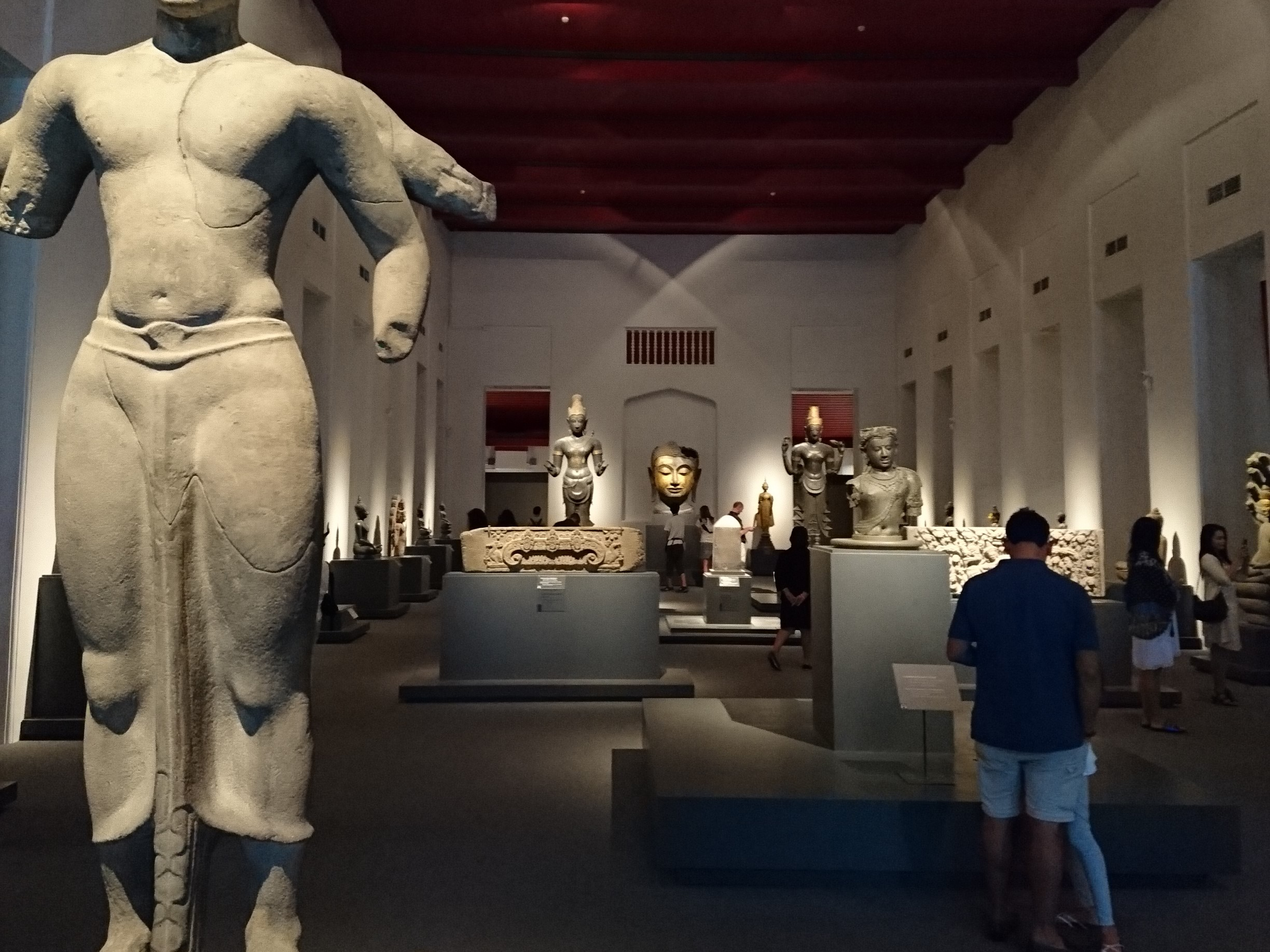
The Gallery of Thai History in Siwamokkhaphiman Hall

The National Museum Bangkok houses three permanent exhibition galleries:

1. The Thai History Gallery, located at the front of Siwamokhaphiman Hall, a former ceremonial hall. On display is the Ram Khamhaeng Inscription, which was added to UNESCO's Memory of the World Programme Register in 2003. Another exhibit addresses the question, "Where did the Thais come from?" The gallery also features artifacts from Thailand's prehistoric period to the Bangkok period.
2. The Archaeological and Art History Collections are presented in two parts:
  1. The Prehistory Gallery, at the rear of Siwamokhaphiman Hall, covering Thailand's prehistoric cultures.
  2. The Art History Gallery, in the North Wing Building, displaying sculptures and other works from the Dvaravati, Srivijaya, and Lopburi periods (before 1257 CE) through to the early Bangkok period (c. 1782).
3. The Decorative Arts and Ethnological Collection, displayed in the former central palace buildings. This section focuses on courtly and regional material culture, including gold and precious stones, mother of pearl inlay, royal emblems and insignia, costumes and textiles, ceramics, carved ivory, historic royal conveyances, weapons, and musical instruments.

== The Golden Boy and the Kneeling Lady ==
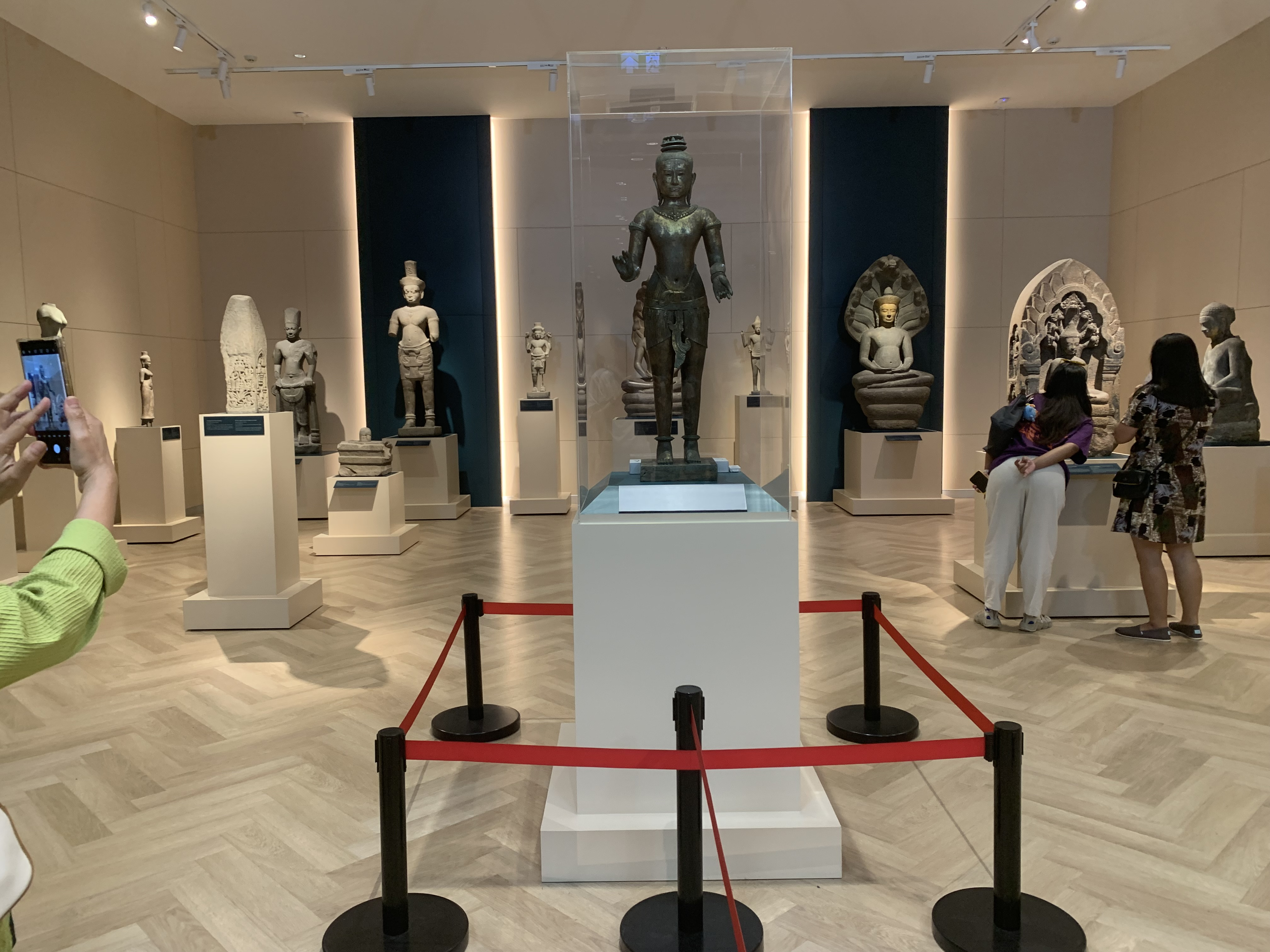
The Golden Boy bronze statue on display at the National Museum Bangkok after its repatriation from the Metropolitan Museum of Art in New York in 2024.

In May 2024, the Golden Boy, a 4-foot-tall bronze statue dating to around 900 years ago, was repatriated to Thailand from the United States and unveiled at the museum. Another related sculpture, known as the Kneeling Lady, was also placed on public display. Both statues had previously been held at the Metropolitan Museum of Art in New York City for about three decades. The repatriation marked a rare success in Thailand's ongoing efforts to recover thousands of cultural artifacts that were looted or illicitly trafficked.

The two bronze sculptures are believed to have originated from the lower Northeast region of Thailand, possibly in present-day Buriram province, and are stylistically linked to the Khmer art tradition that flourished in the area between the 11th and 12th centuries CE. The Golden Boy, sometimes identified as a representation of Shiva or a Khmer monarch such as Jayavarman VI, was reportedly unearthed by a villager around fifty years earlier before being illicitly exported. The artifacts entered the Met's collection in the late 1980s, during a period when antiquities dealers associated with Douglas Latchford later charged with art trafficking supplied many Southeast Asian sculptures to Western museums.

Following prolonged diplomatic discussions and provenance research, the Met formally agreed in 2023 to return the two statues to Thailand, alongside fourteen Khmer works to Cambodia. The repatriation ceremony, held at the National Museum Bangkok in May 2024, was attended by Thai cultural officials and U.S. representatives, symbolizing a growing international commitment to address the colonial-era and post-war trade in looted antiquities. The Thai Ministry of Culture noted that additional requests were being pursued for roughly thirty more artifacts believed to have been removed from the country during the 20th century.

== The buildings ==
The museum has three main exhibition spaces:

- Siwamokhaphiman Hall – This building was constructed when Maha Sura Singhanat, the Prince Successor to Rama I, built the Front Palace. Originally used as an audience hall, it now houses the Thai History Gallery.
- Buddhaisawan Chapel – The chapel was built in 1787 to house the important Buddha image Phra Phuttha Sihing. The interior murals depict scenes from the life of the Buddha.
- The Red House – This teak residence was originally one of the private quarters of Princess Sri Sudarak, the elder sister of King Rama I. It was later moved from the old palace in Thonburi to the Grand Palace for Queen Sri Suriyendra, wife of Rama II. The Red House is now furnished in early Rattanakosin period style, depicting aspects of royal domestic life, and includes objects once belonging to Queen Sri Suriyendra.

== Gallery ==
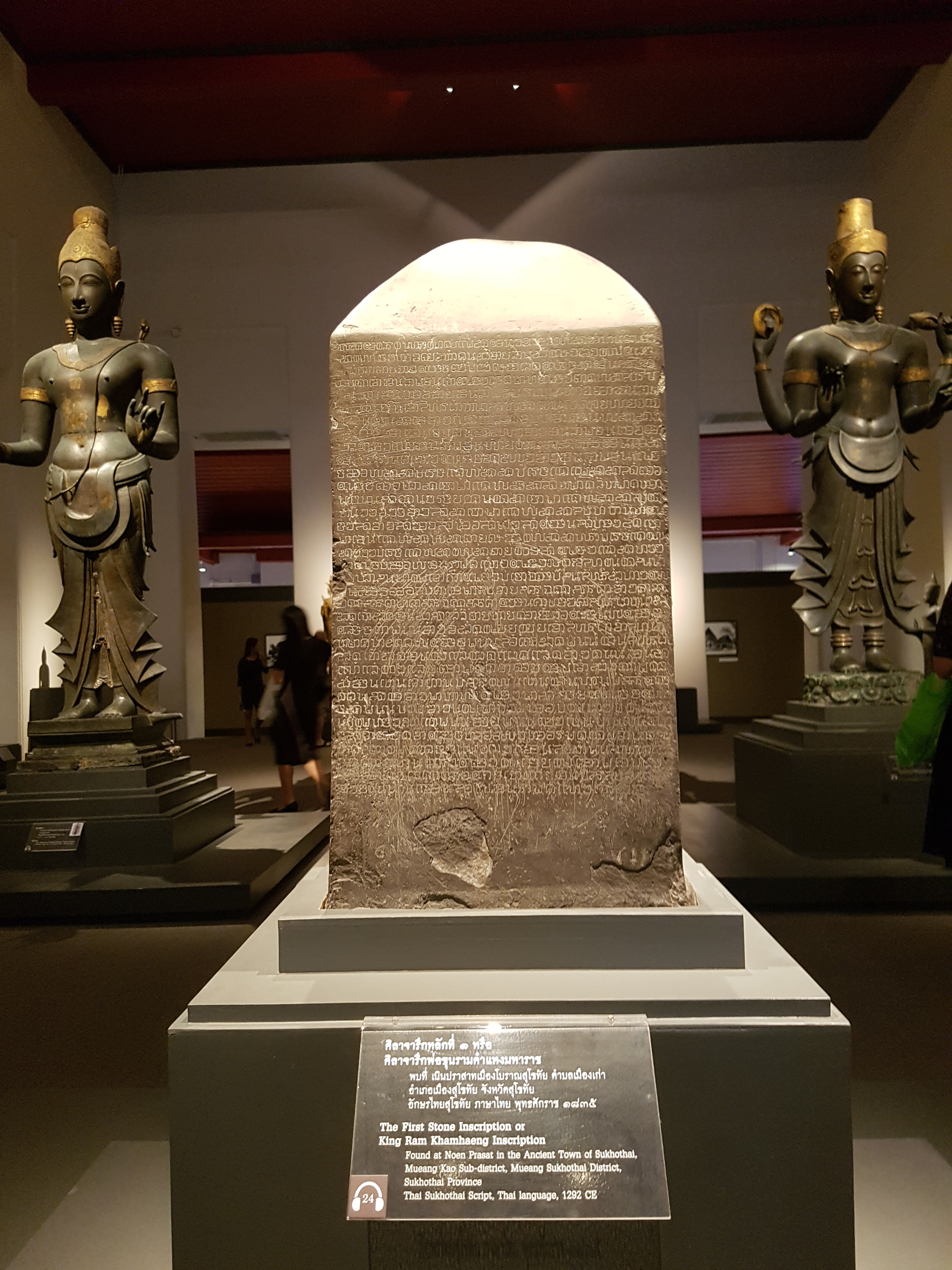
Ram Khamhaeng Inscription, describing early Thai script, government, religion and society

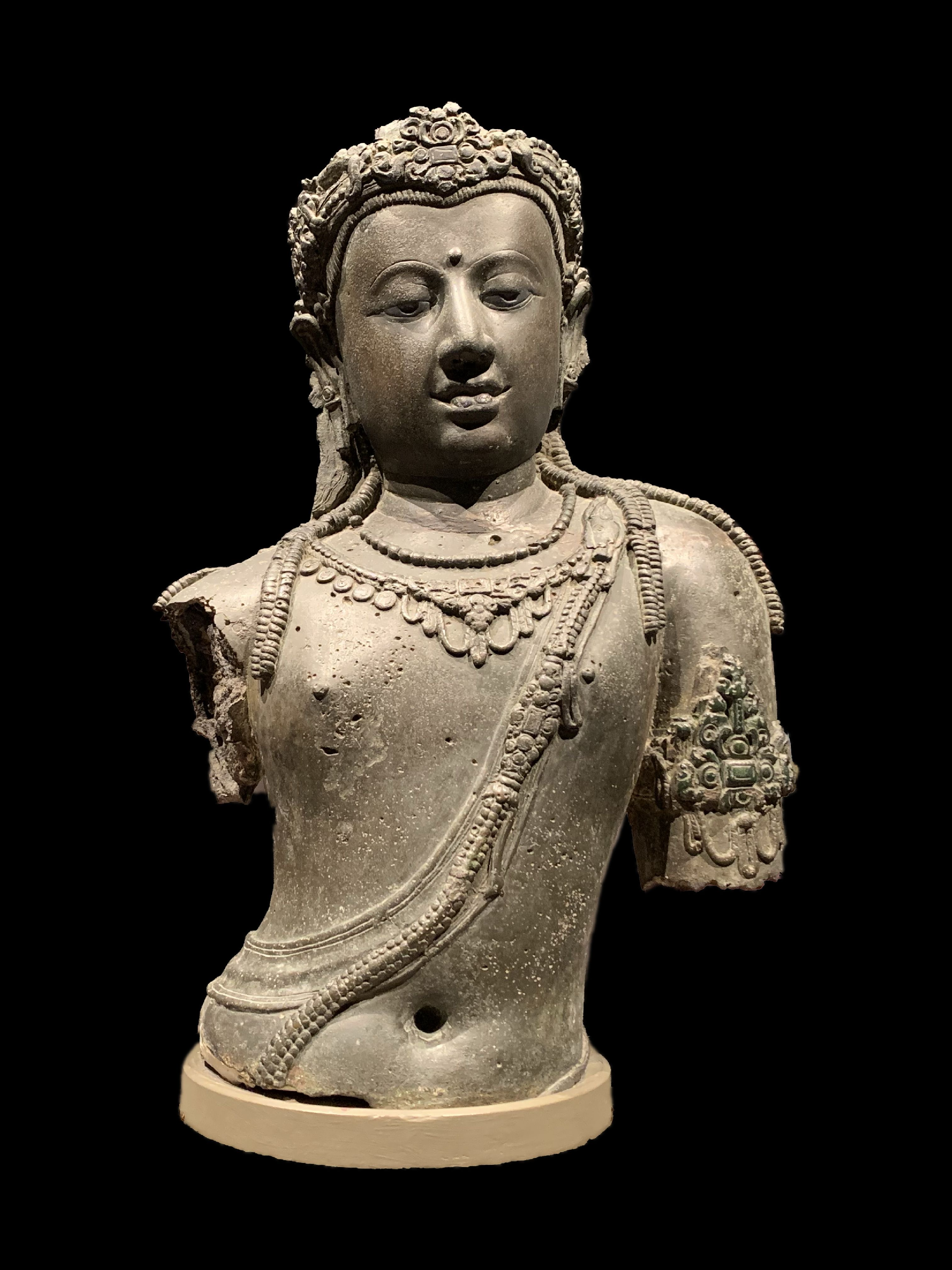
8th-century bronze torso of Avalokiteshvara of Chaiya, Srivijaya art from Chaiya, Surat Thani; shows Central Javanese influence

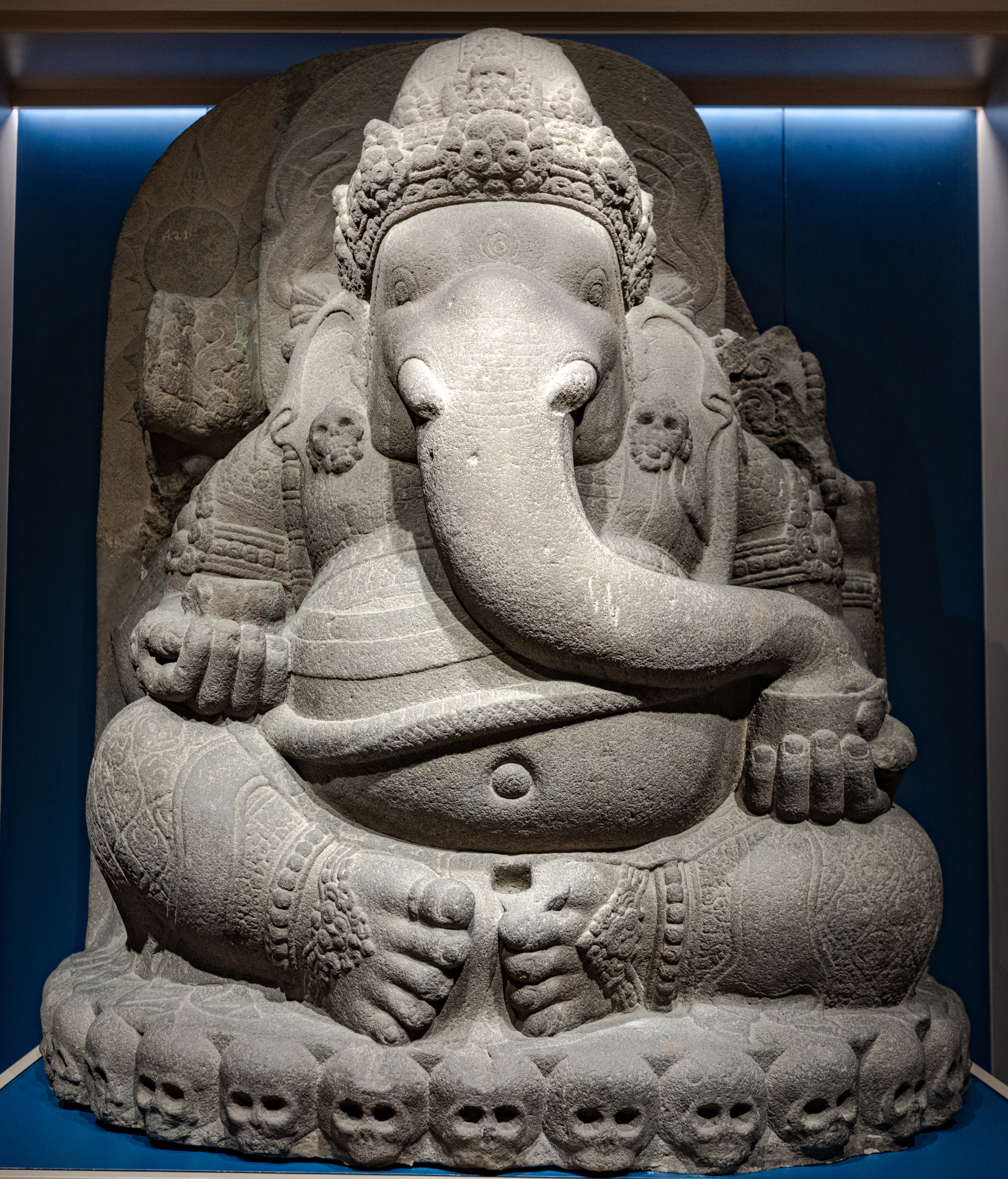
Four-armed Ganesha, c. 10th-11th century CE, from Candi Singhasari, East Java

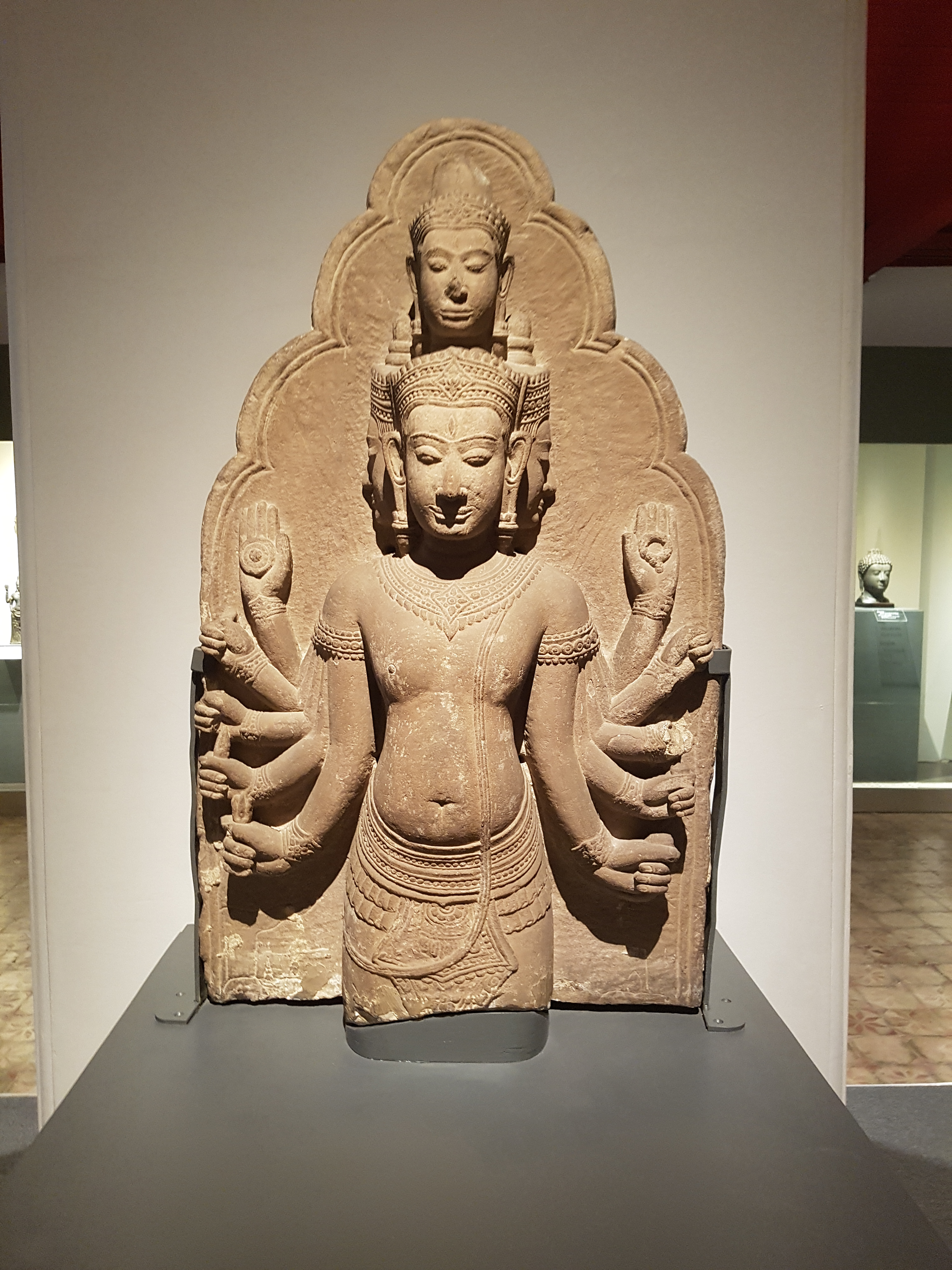
Five-headed Shiva, Ayutthayan art, 21st–22nd centuries BE

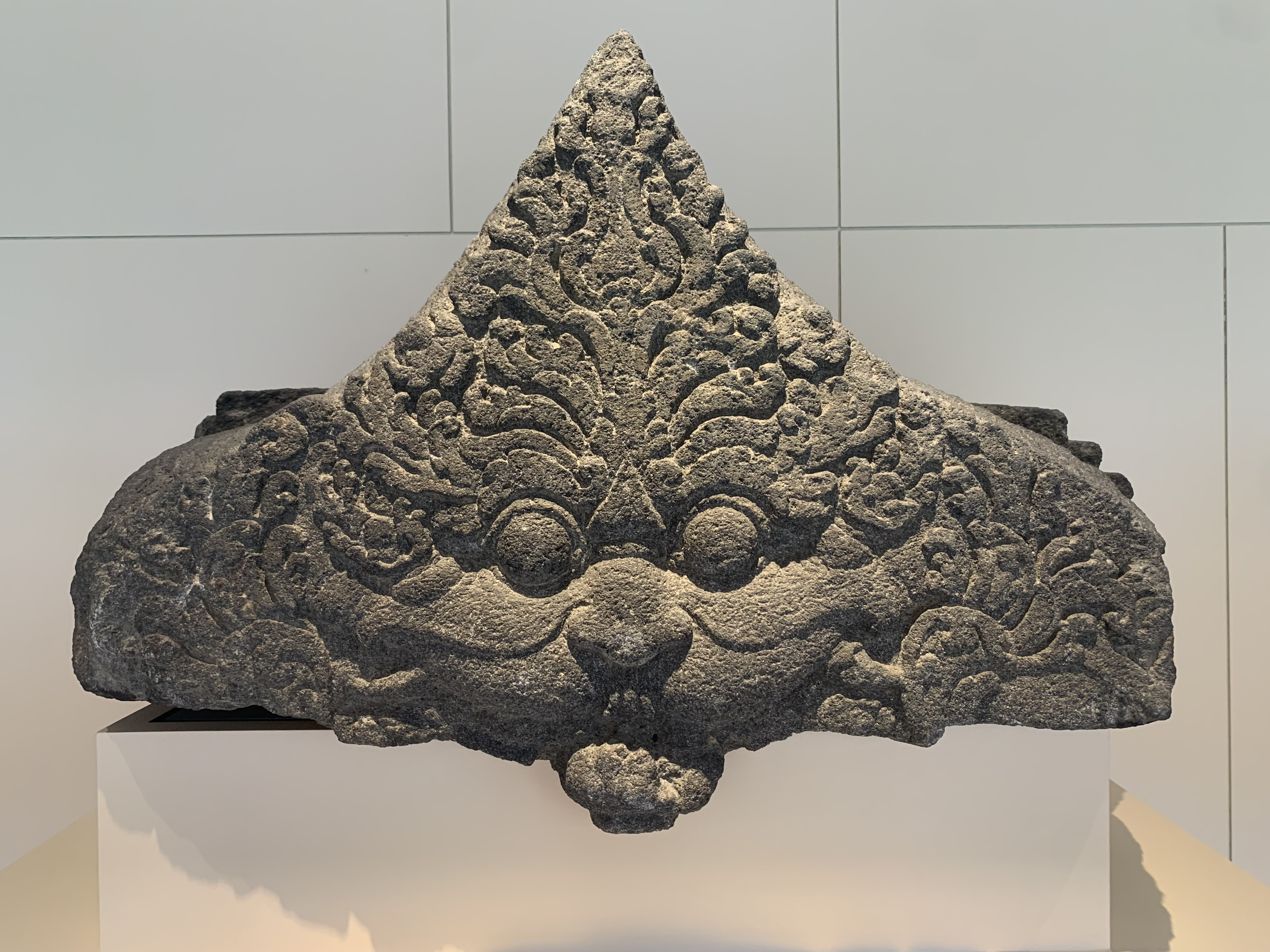
Kāla, c. 9th–10th century CE, from Borobudur, Central Java

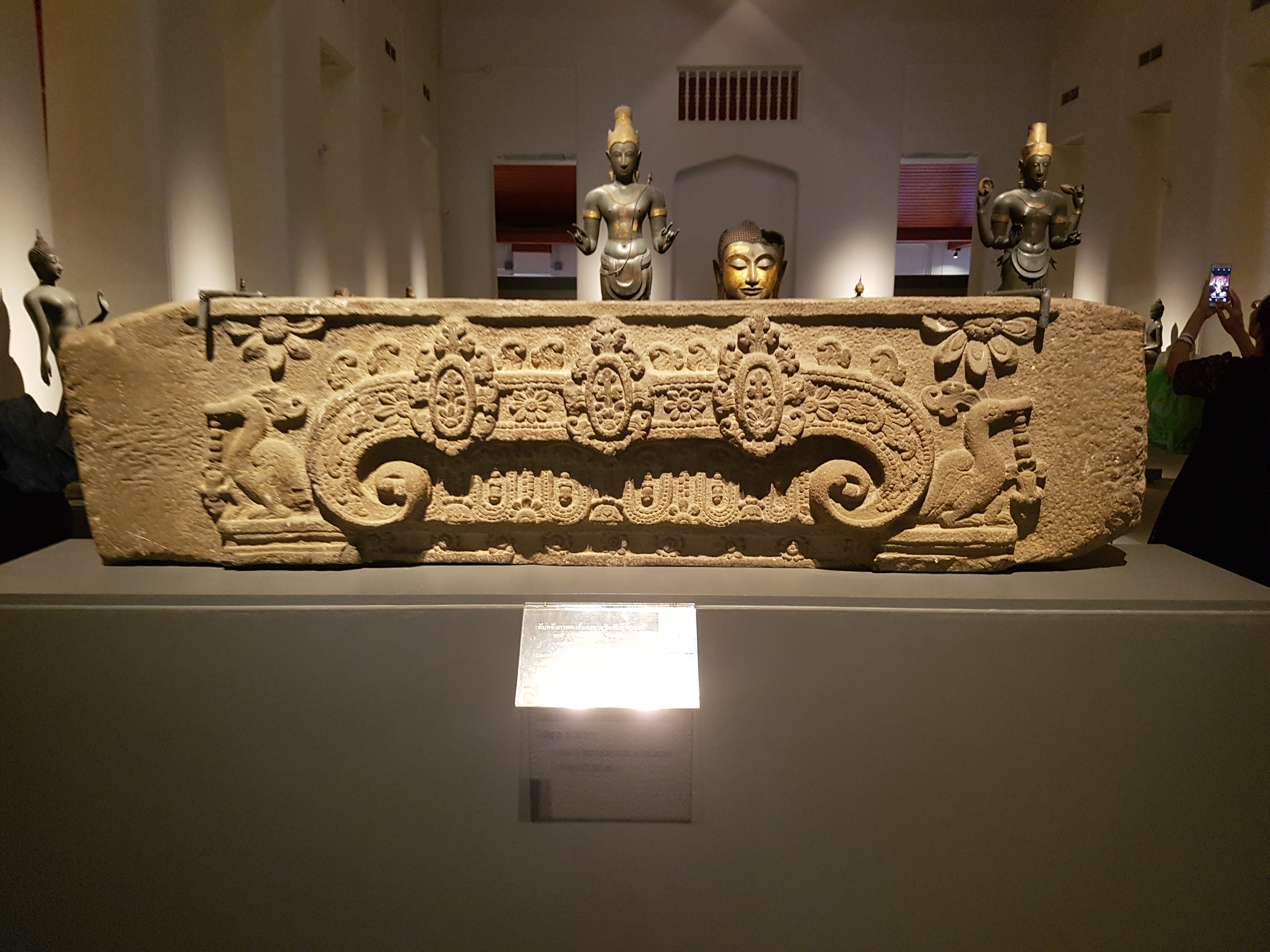
Floral lintel, 13th century BE (c. 8th century CE), from Watthana Nakhon, Sa Kaeo

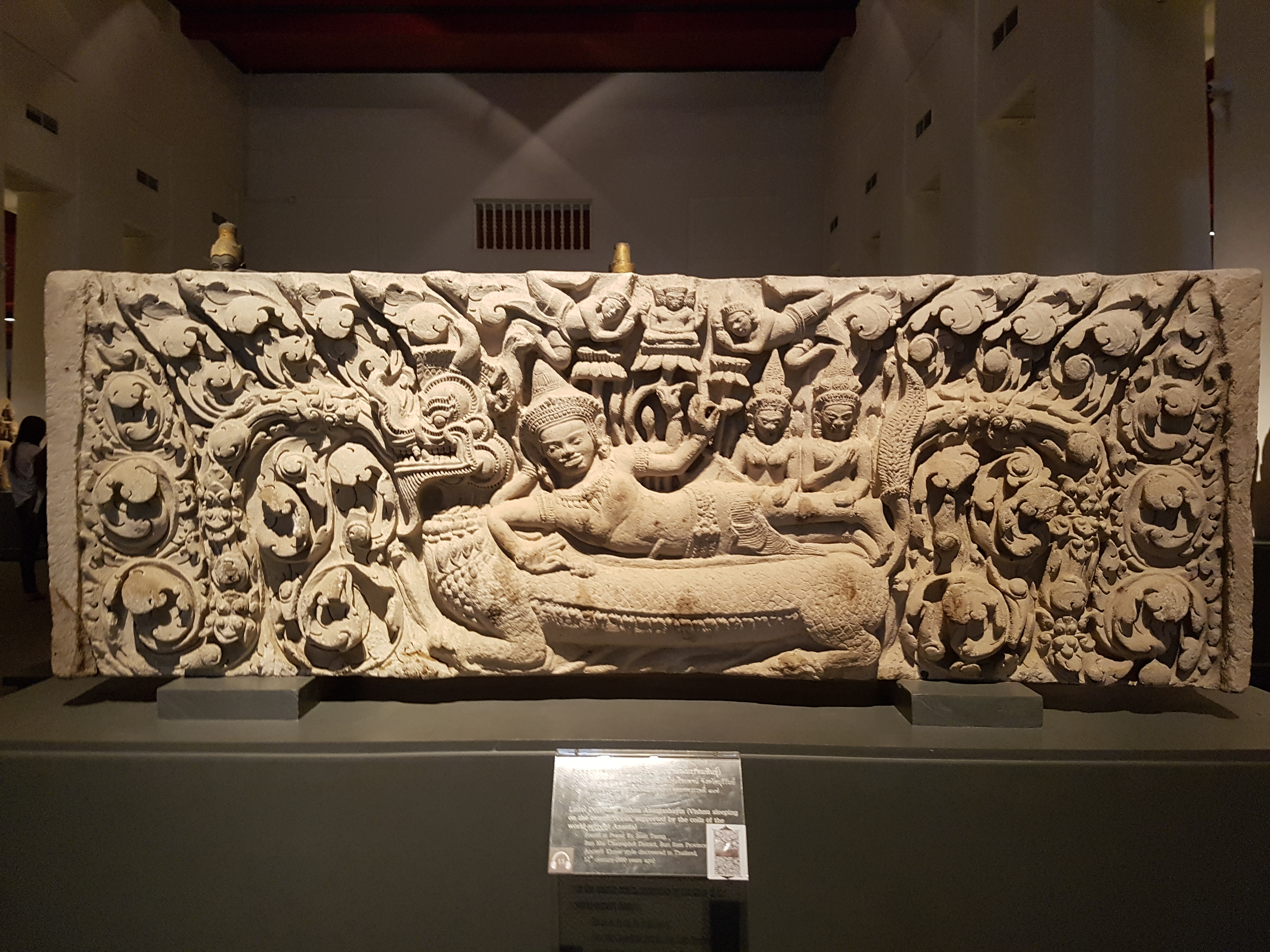
Lintel depicting the Hindu god Narayana reclining on the serpent Shesha amid the Ocean of Milk, 17th century BE (c. 12th century CE), from Ku Suan Taeng Temple, Ban Mai Chaiyaphot, Buriram

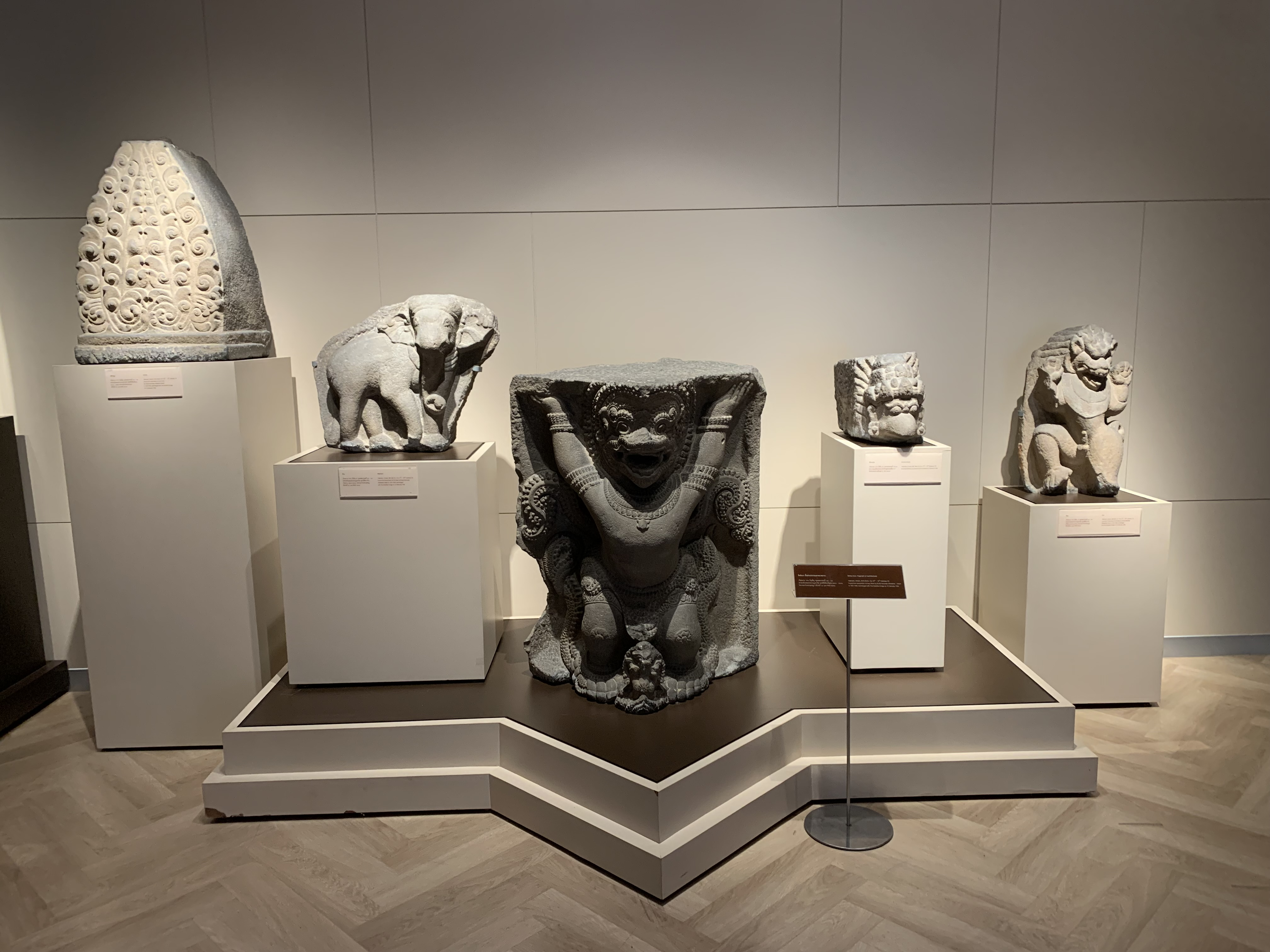
Cham lintel, Bình Định, c. 12th–13th century CE; excavated at Quy Nhơn by the French School of the Far East (1927–1928), exchanged with a Thai Buddha image on 16 February 1938

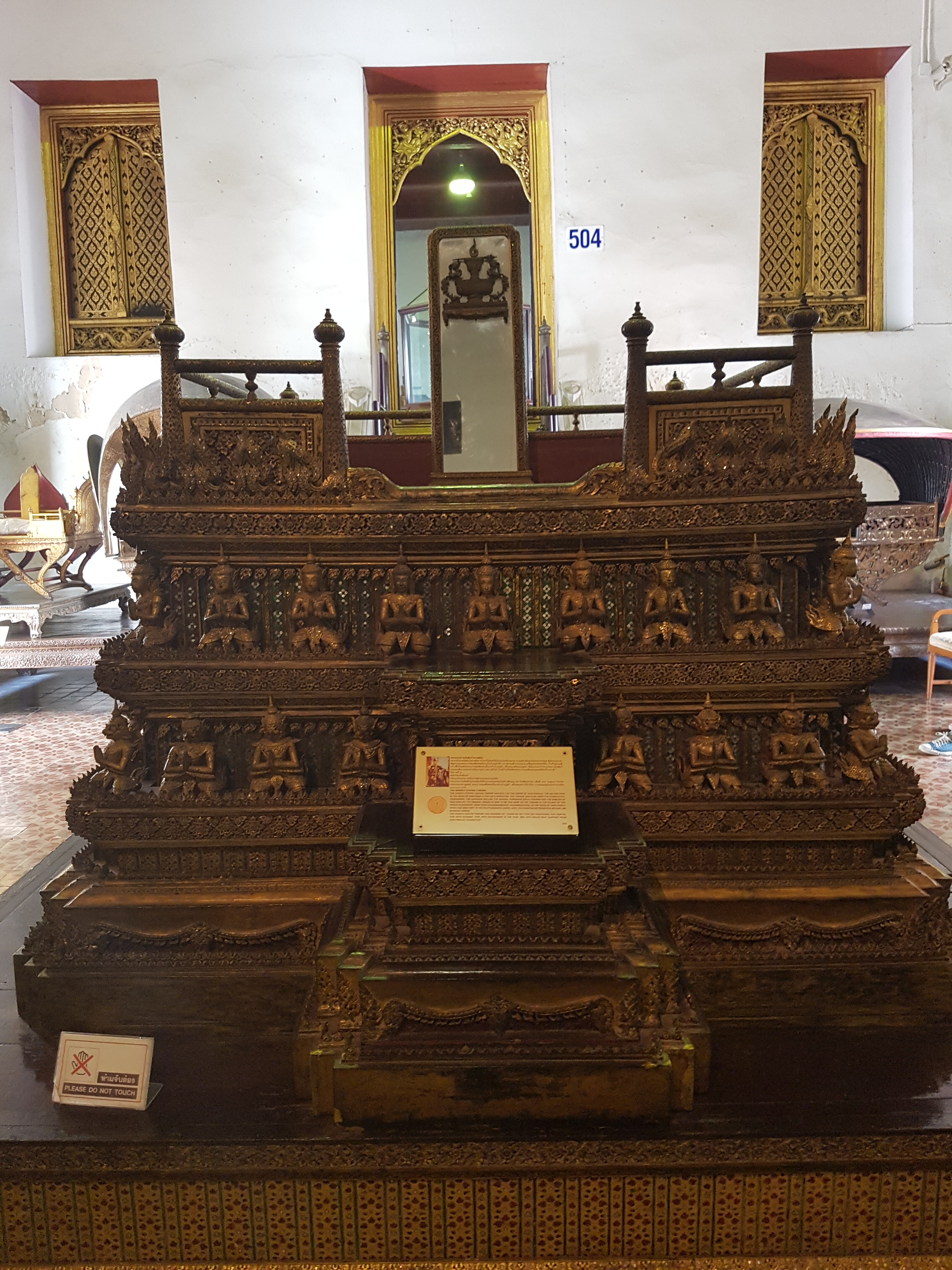
Throne of the White Umbrella, a royal throne once occupied by Prince Pinklao

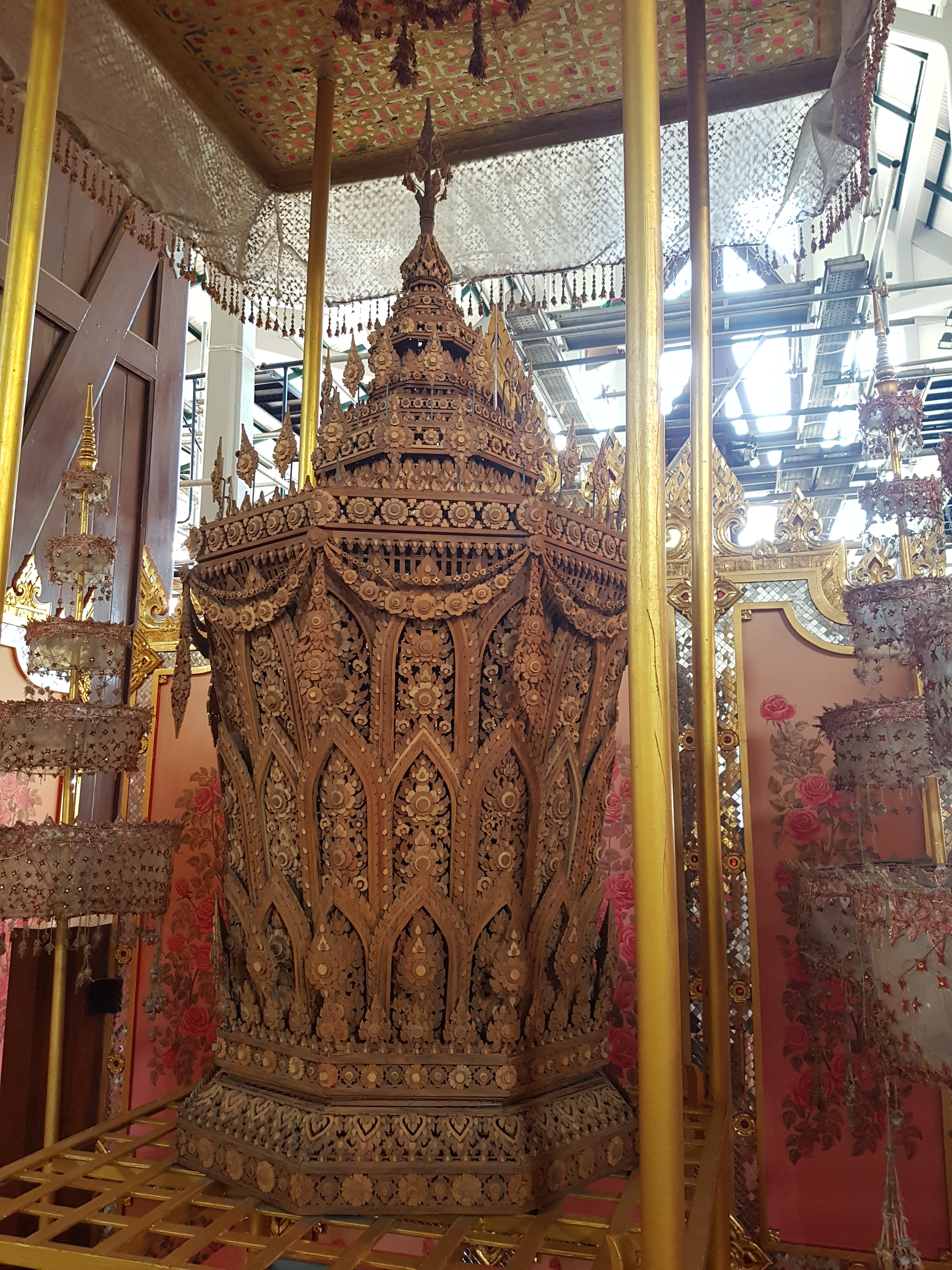
Funeral pyre and urn of Princess Bejaratana Rajasuda at Chariot Hall

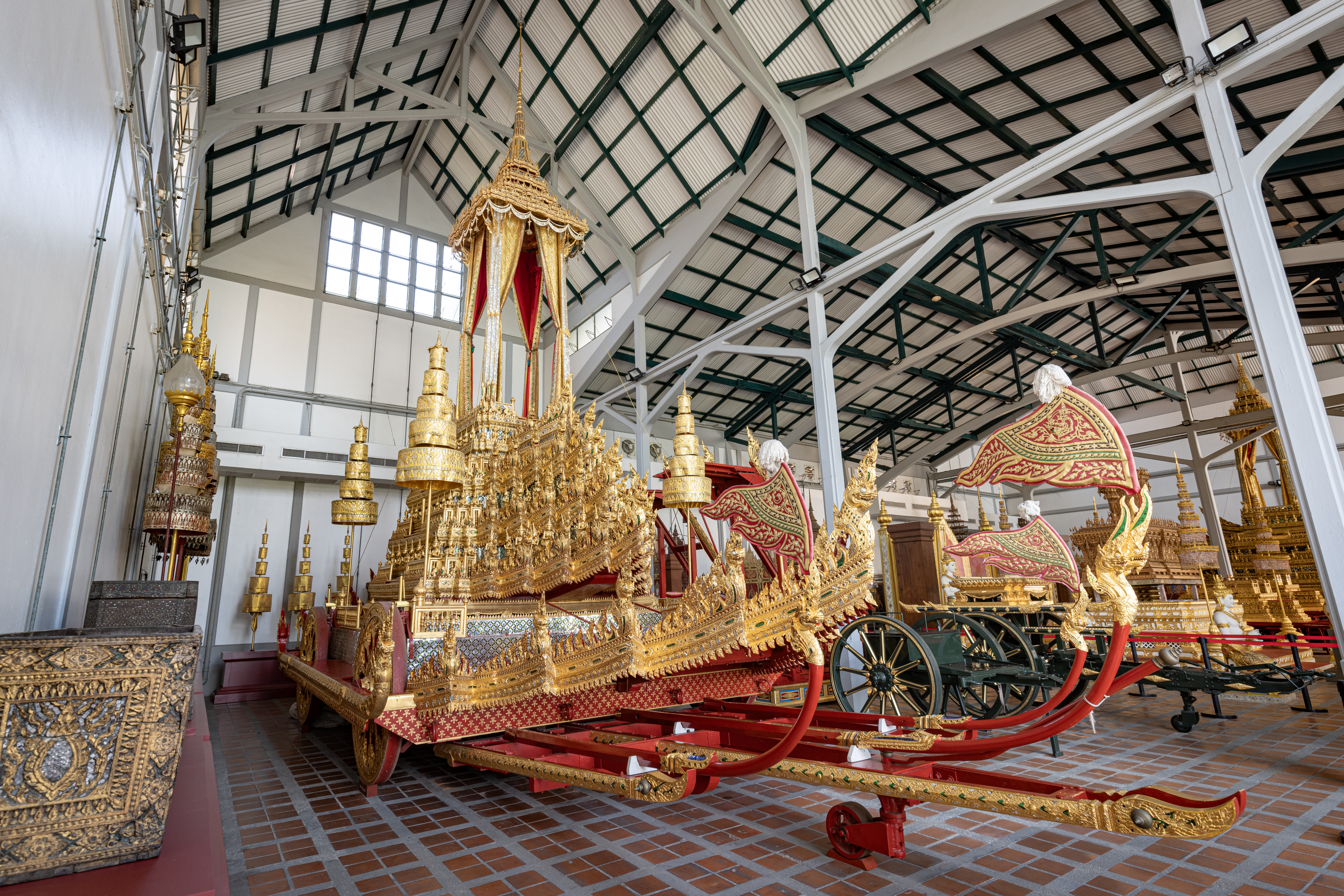
Great Victory Royal Chariot, commissioned by King Rama I in 1795 CE.

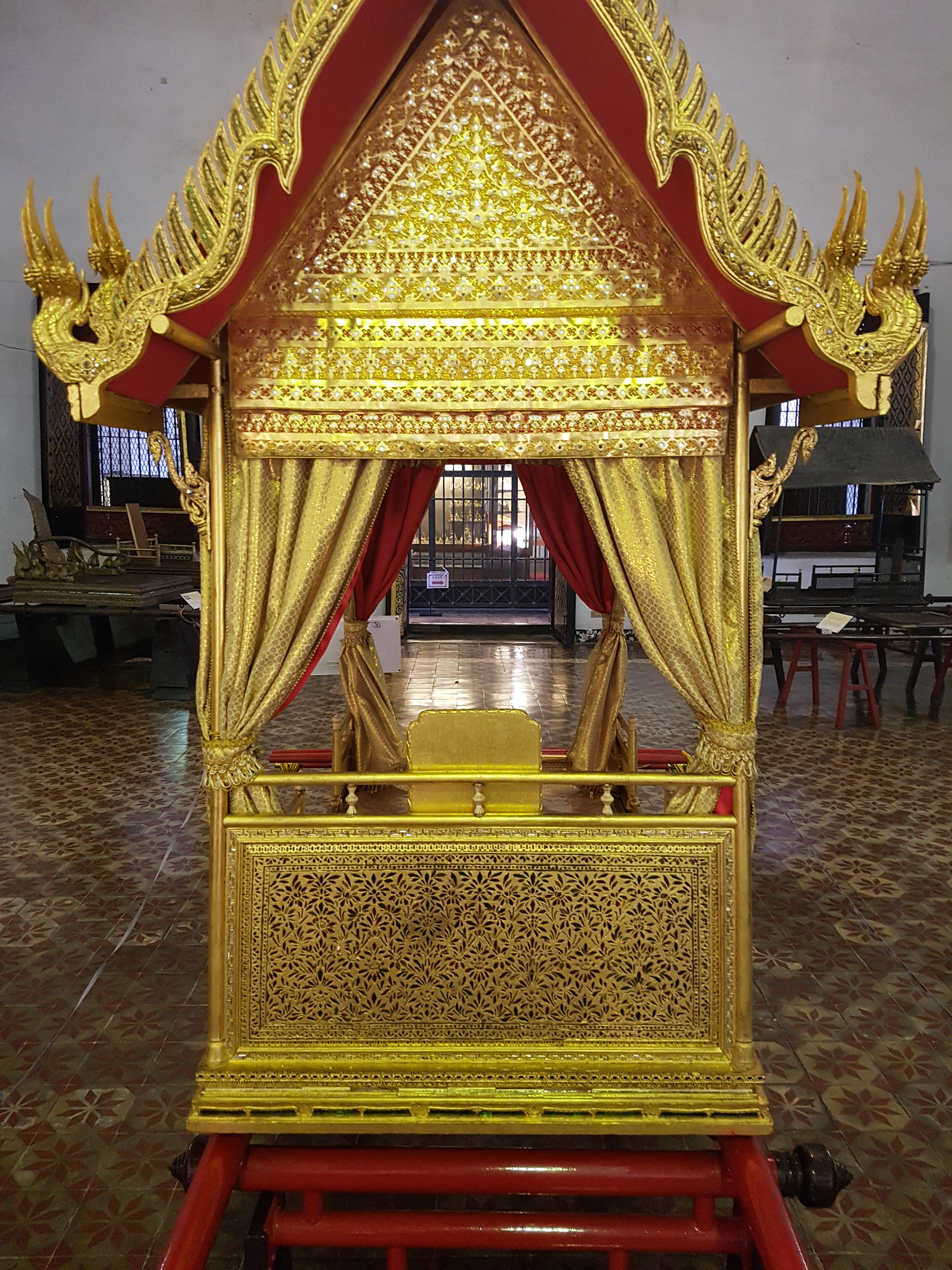
Phra Wo Siwika Kan ("Royal Golden Litter")

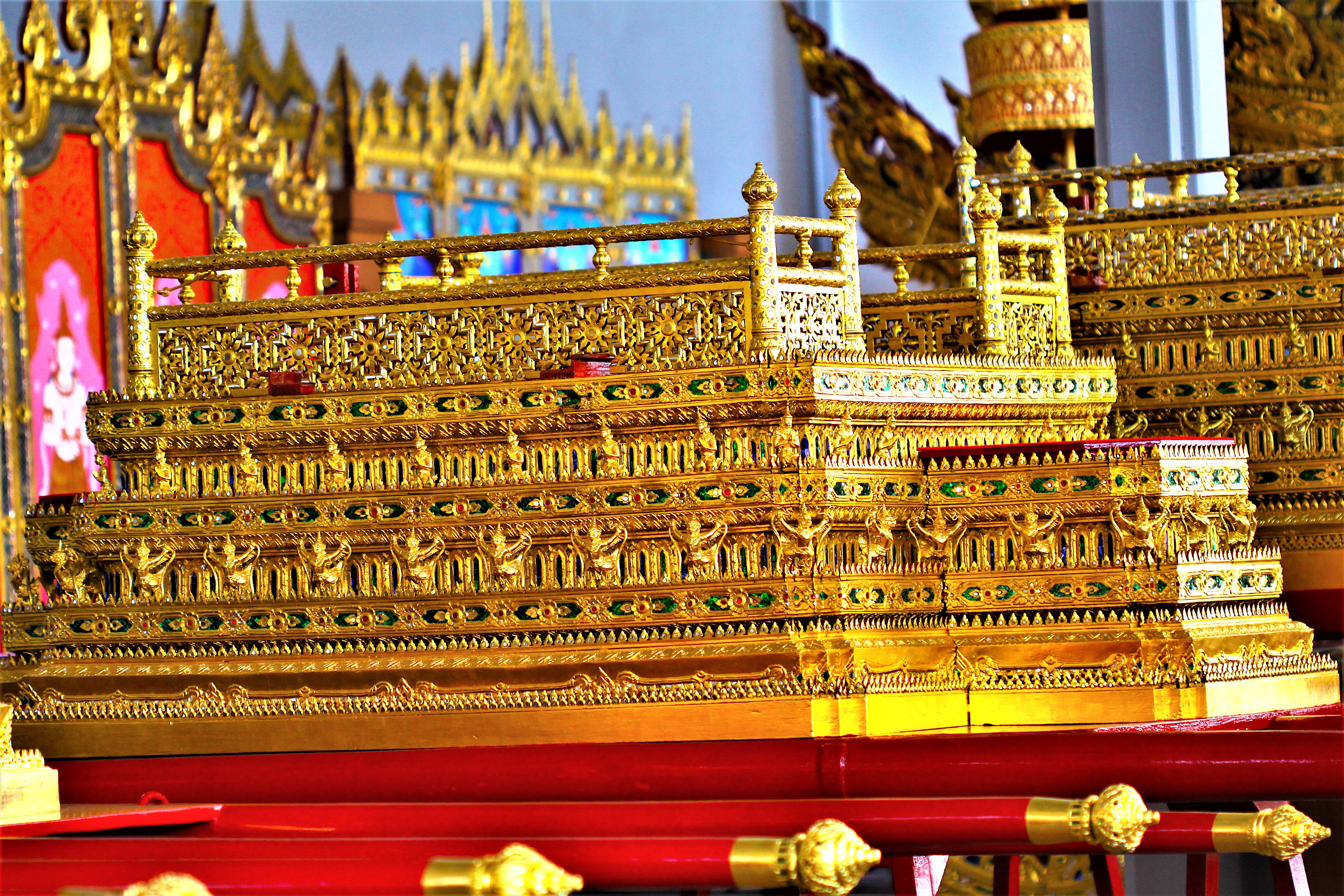
Phra Yannamas Sam Lam Khan ("Royal Chariot with Three Poles")

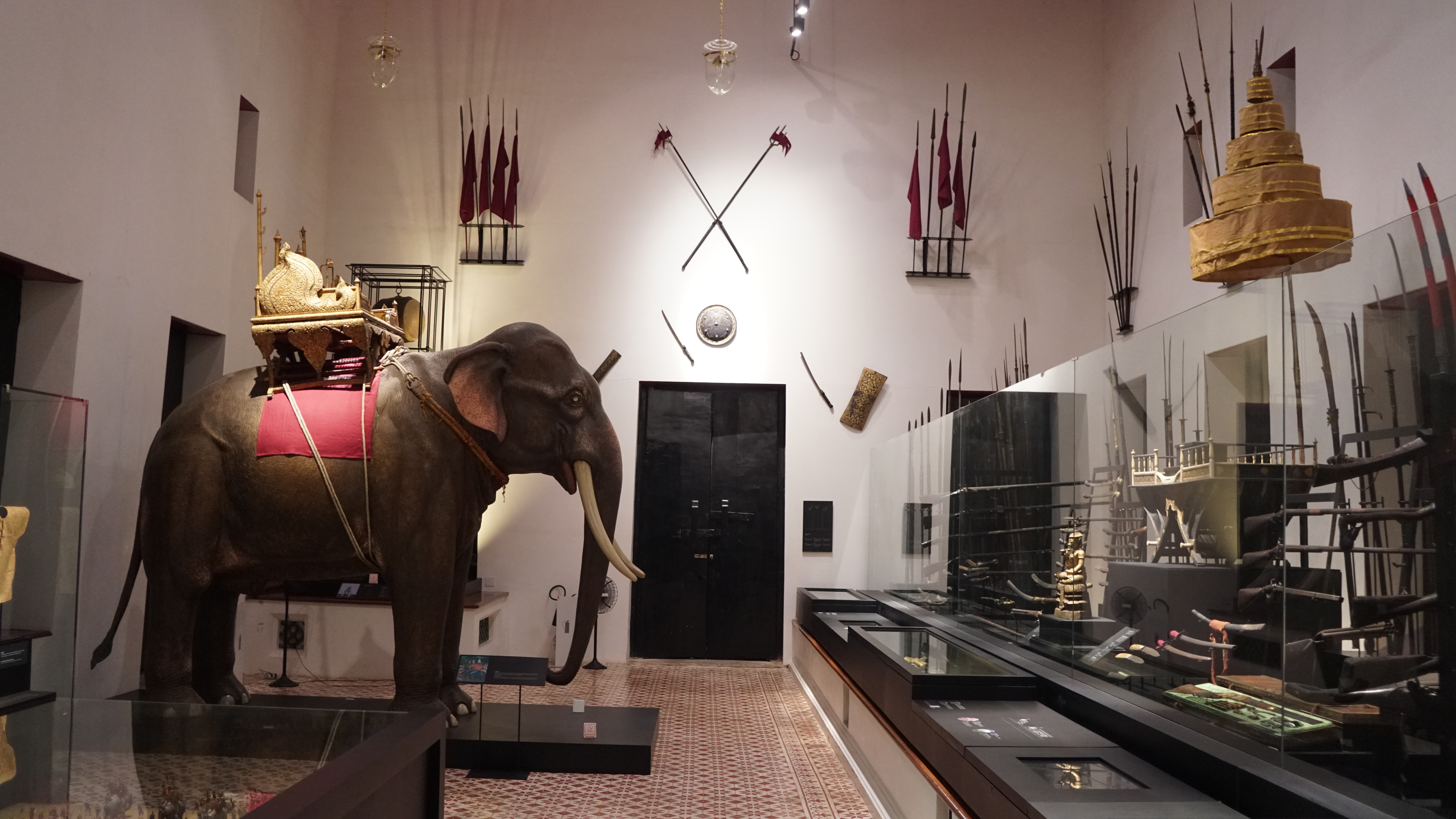
War elephant and antique weapons

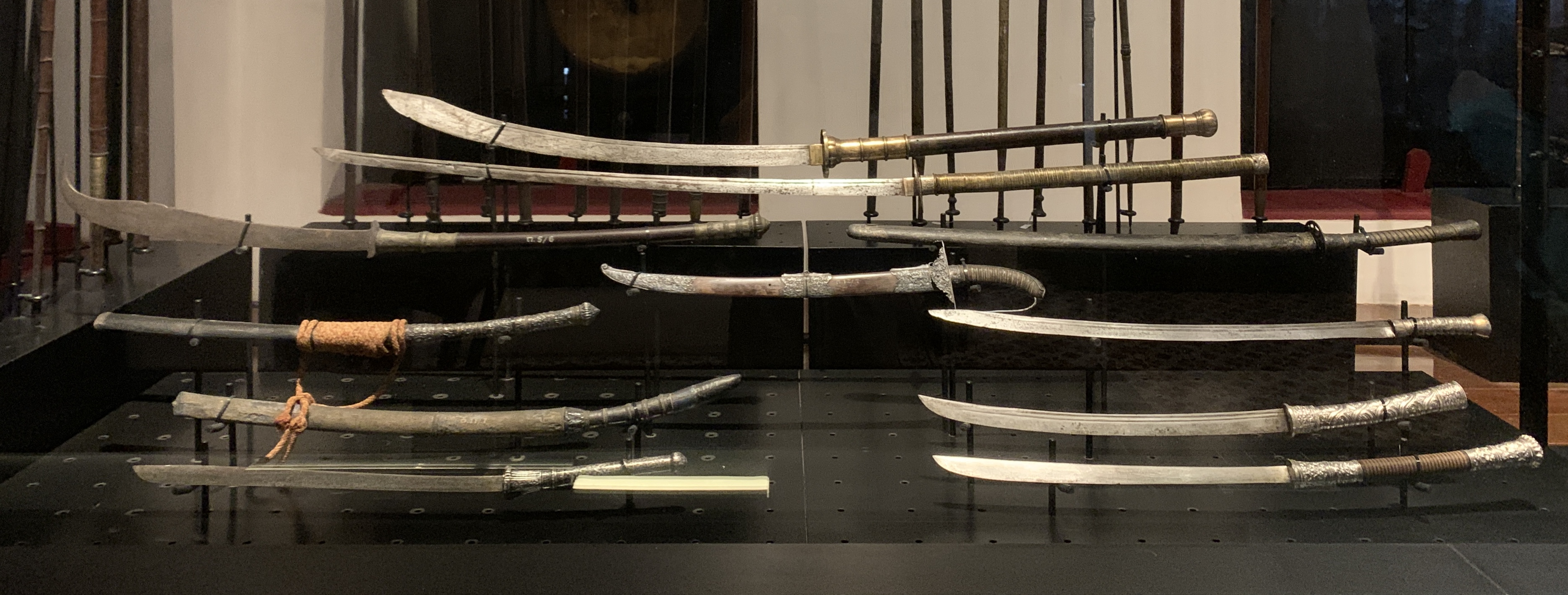
Collection of Thai swords and polearms

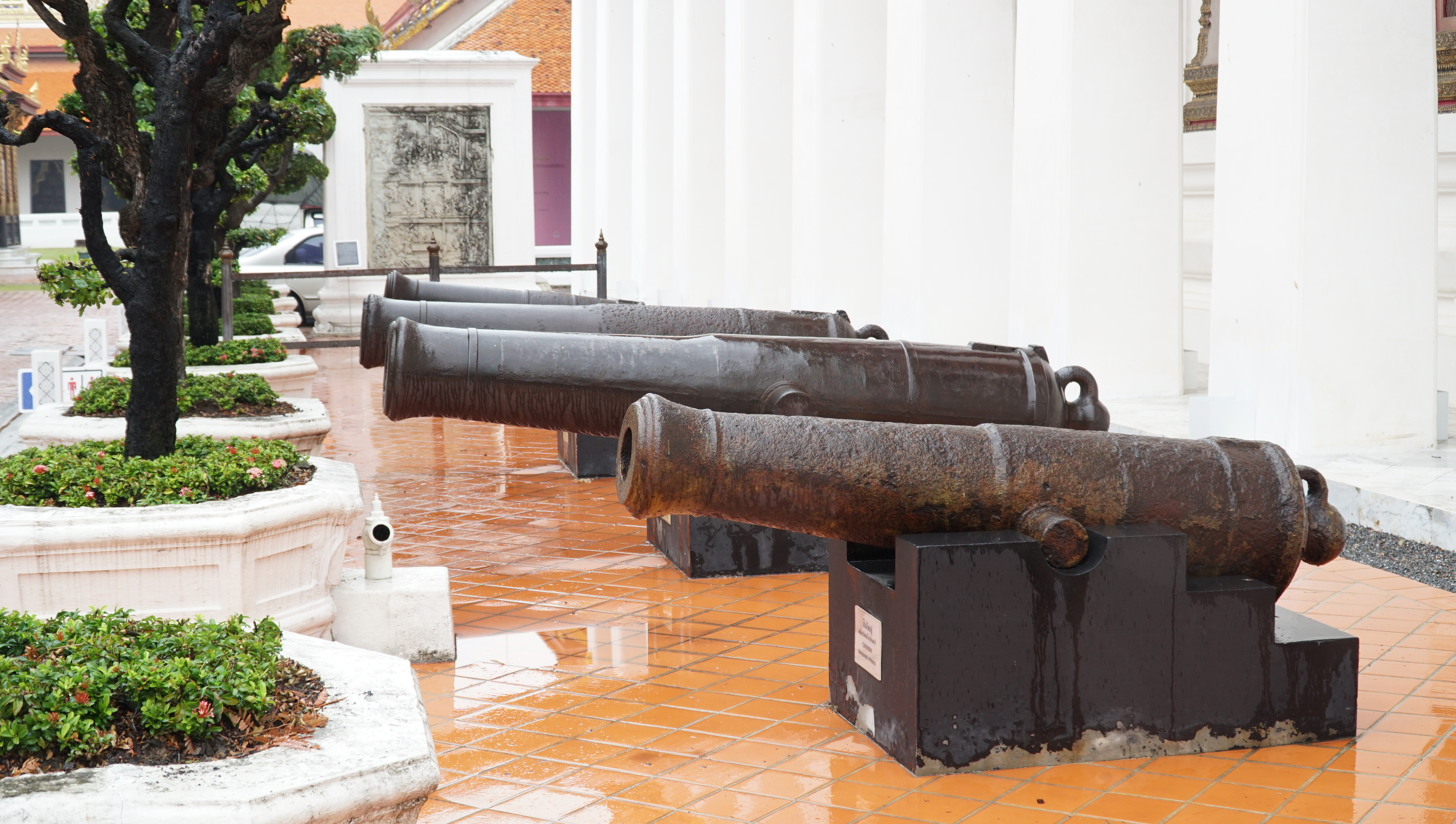
Cannons

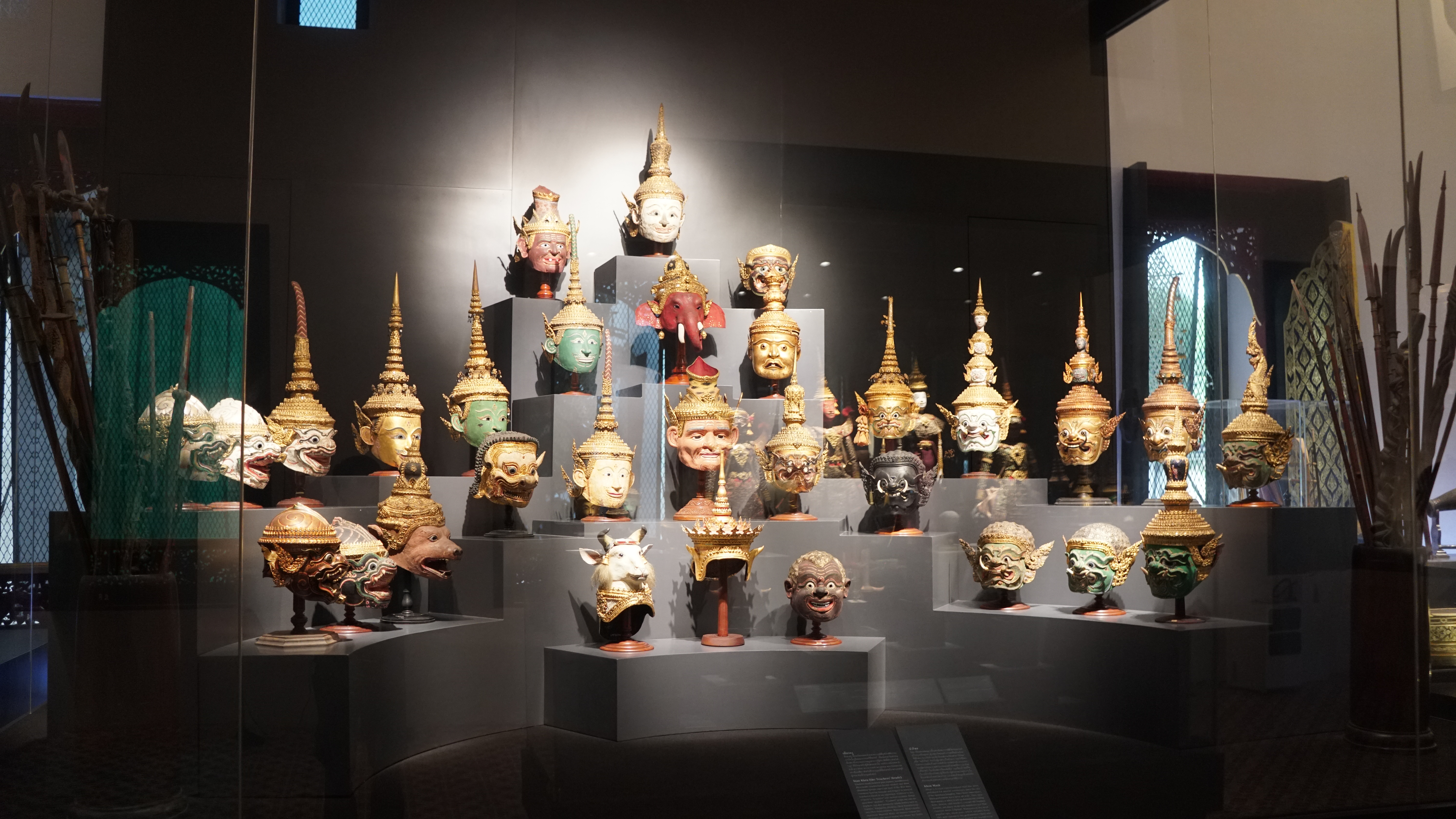
Khon masks

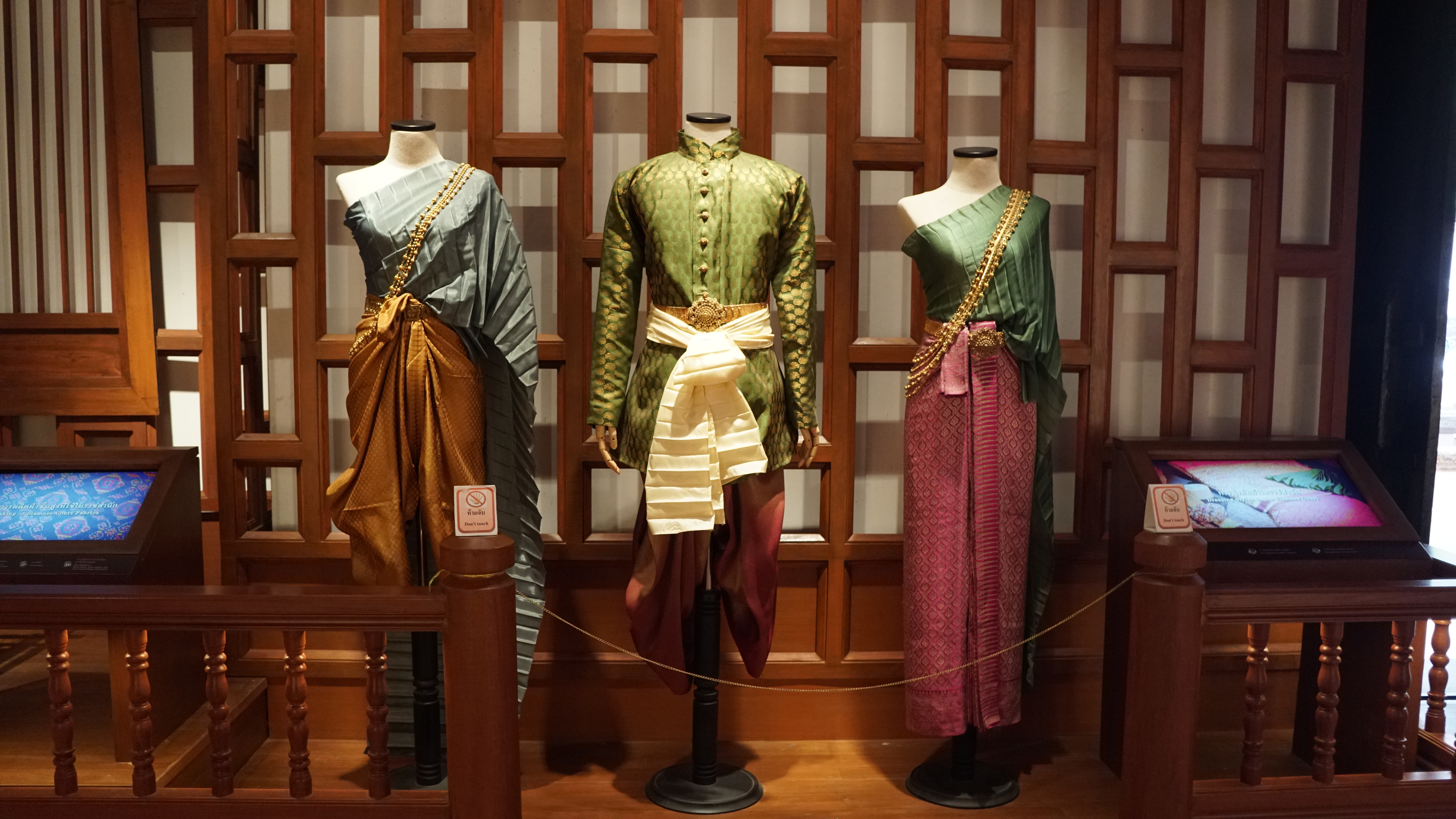
Traditional Thai clothing

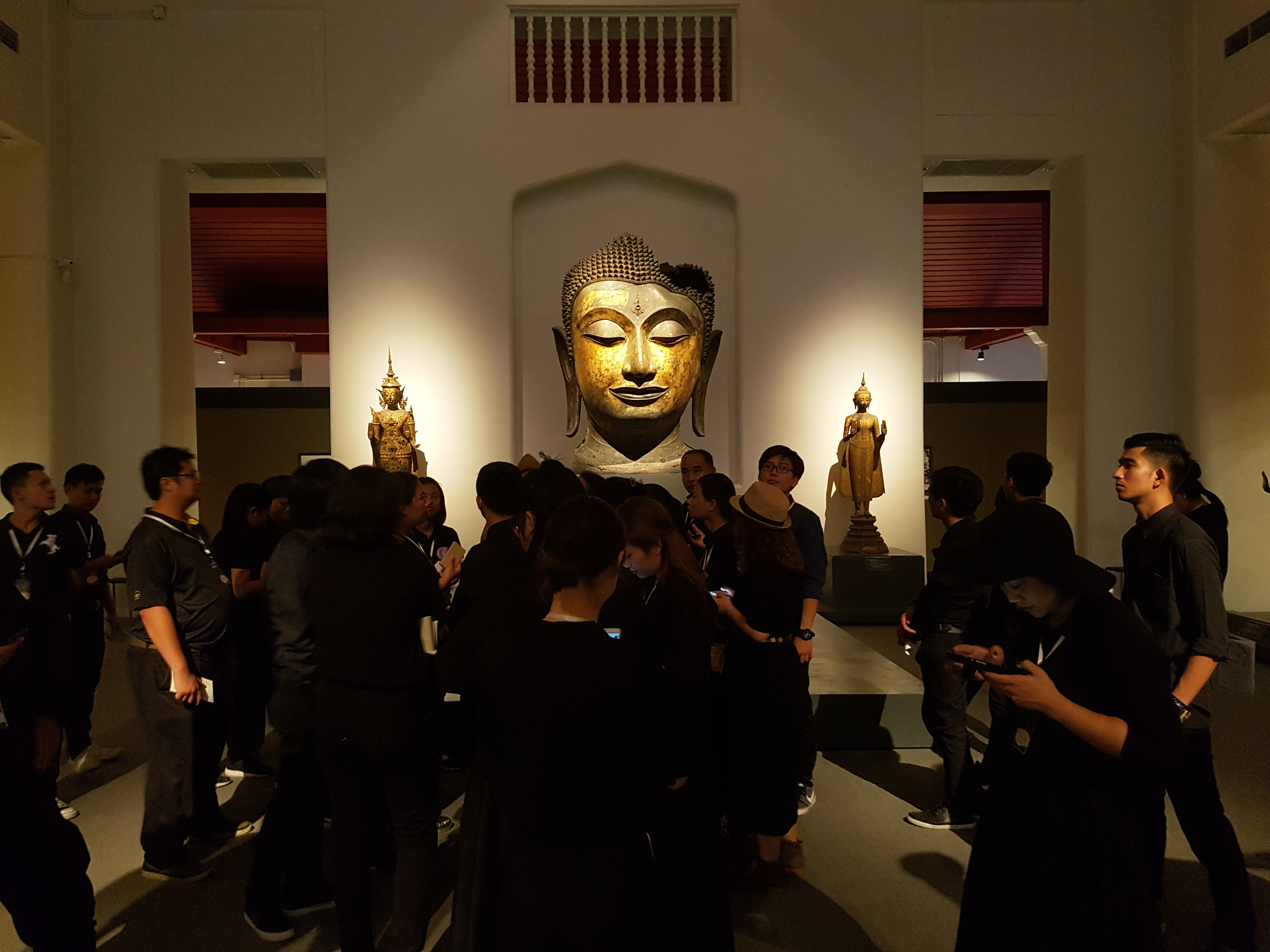
Inside Siwamokhaphiman Hall

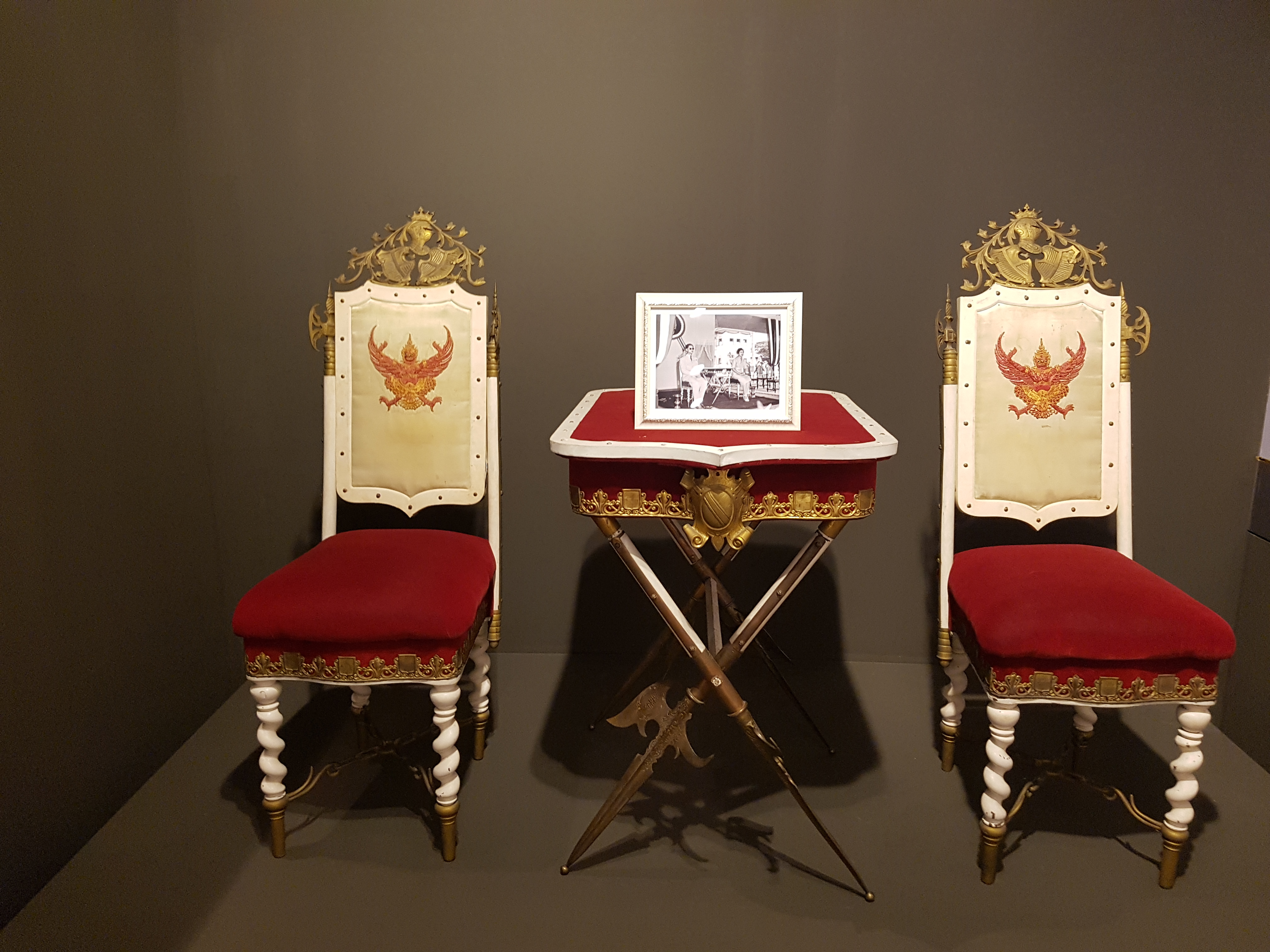
Chairs occupied by King Bhumibol Adulyadej and Queen Sirikit during their visit to Nakhon Ratchasima on 2 November 1955
