= Ram Khamhaeng Inscription =

Early Thai inscription

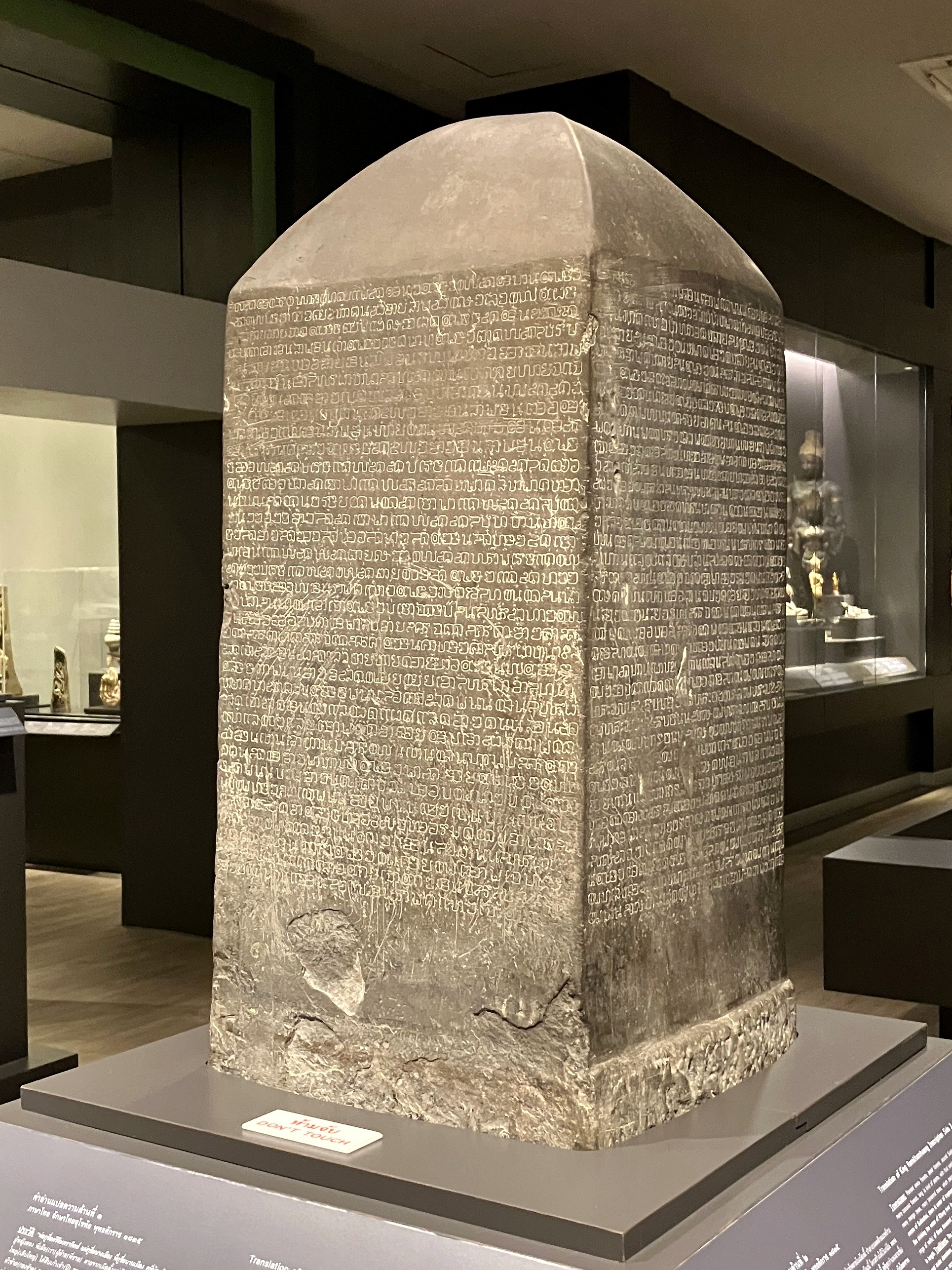
- The Ram Khamhaeng Inscription, on display at the Bangkok National Museum

General Information
- Dynasty: Phra Ruang
- Inscription type: stele
- Script: Lai Sue Thai
- Language: Thai
- Condition: Conserved

Discovery
- Place found: Noen Prasat (nowadays in Sukhothai Historical Park)
- Date discovered: 1833
- Current location: Bangkok National Museum

Contents of the Inscription
- Author: Ram Khamhaeng

Location and Status

The Ram Khamhaeng Inscription, formally known as Sukhothai Inscription No. 1, is a stone stele bearing inscriptions which have traditionally been regarded as the earliest example of the Thai script. Discovered in 1833 by King Mongkut (Rama IV), it was eventually deciphered and dated to 1292. The text gives, among other things, a description of the Sukhothai Kingdom during the time of King Ram Khamhaeng, to whom it is usually attributed. The inscription had immense influence over the development of Thai historiography from the early 20th century, which came to regard Sukhothai as the first Thai kingdom.

From the late 1980s to the 1990s, assertions that the stele was a forgery from a later date led to intense scholarly debate. This debate still has not been definitively settled, but subsequent electron microscopy has suggested that the stele is likely to be as old as originally claimed, and the majority of academics in the field today regard it as at least partly authentic. The inscription is widely regarded as the single most important document in Thai history, and was inscribed by UNESCO on its Memory of the World International Register in 2003.

== Description and discovery ==
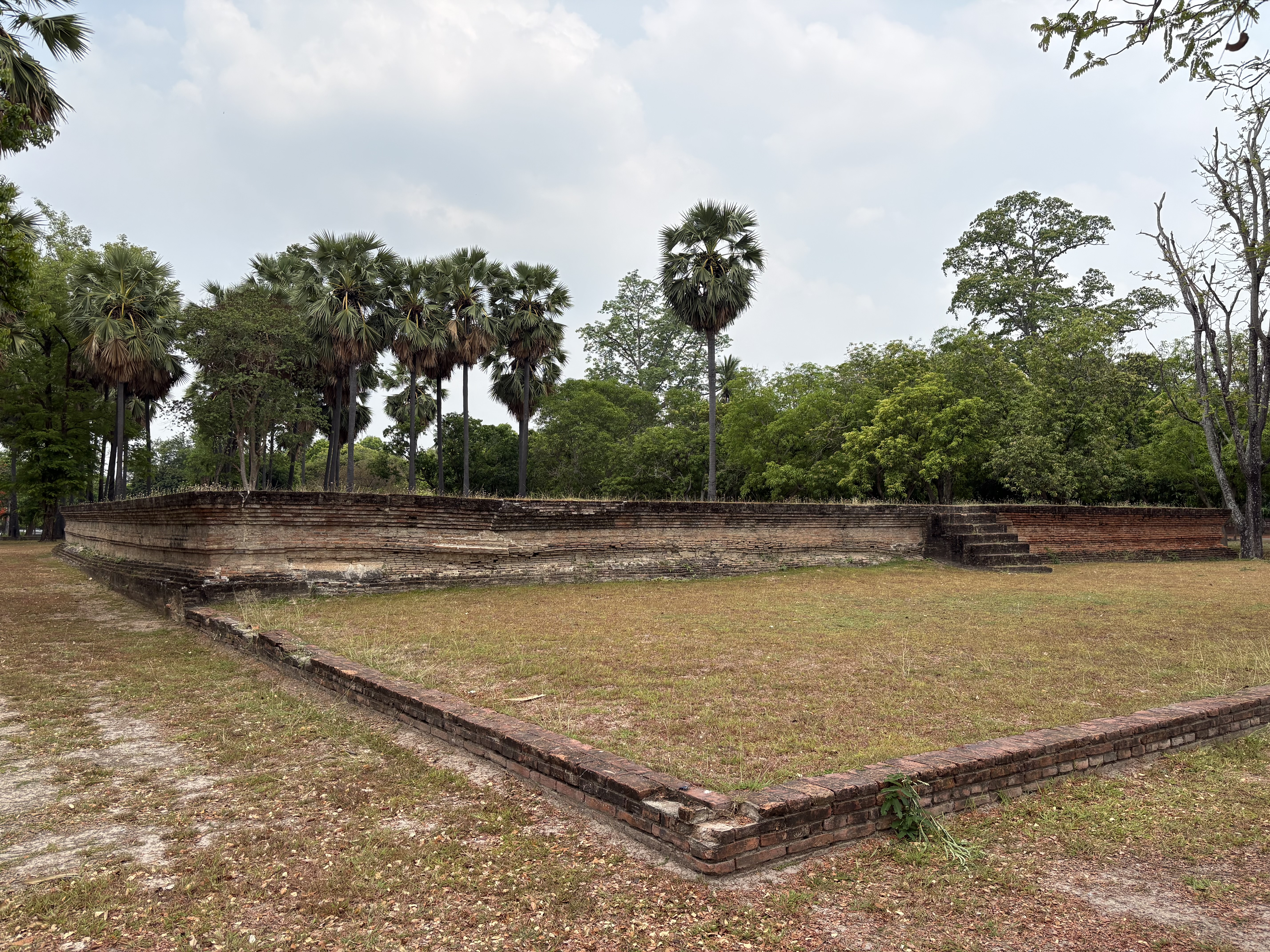
The inscription was discovered near Noen Prasat (pictured), then believed to be the site of the old palace, now in Sukhothai Historical Park.

The stele is in the shape of a four-sided pillar, mostly square and 35.50 centimetres (13.98 in) wide on each side, with a rounded pyramidal top. It is made of siltstone; the upper section which bears the inscriptions is polished, while the lower part, which probably fitted into a base, remains rough. It is 114.50 centimetres (45.08 in) in total height.

The stele was discovered in 1833 by Prince Mongkut, who would later become King in 1851 and was at the time ordained as a monk. Mongkut had made a pilgrimage to the ancient town of Sukhothai, where among the ruins of Noen Prasat, then believed to be the site of the old palace, he discovered the stele, as well as a carved stone slab believed to be the throne of the Sukhothai ruler. He had his retinue bring the objects back to Bangkok, and they were placed in Wat Samo Rai (now named Wat Rachathiwat) where he was residing. The inscription followed Mongkut to Wat Bowonniwet in 1836, and was later moved to the Grand Palace's Dusit Maha Prasat Throne Hall in 1911. It was again moved to the Vajirañāṇa Library in 1924, and was finally acquired by the Bangkok National Museum in 1968, where it is currently on permanent exhibition.

== Deciphering ==
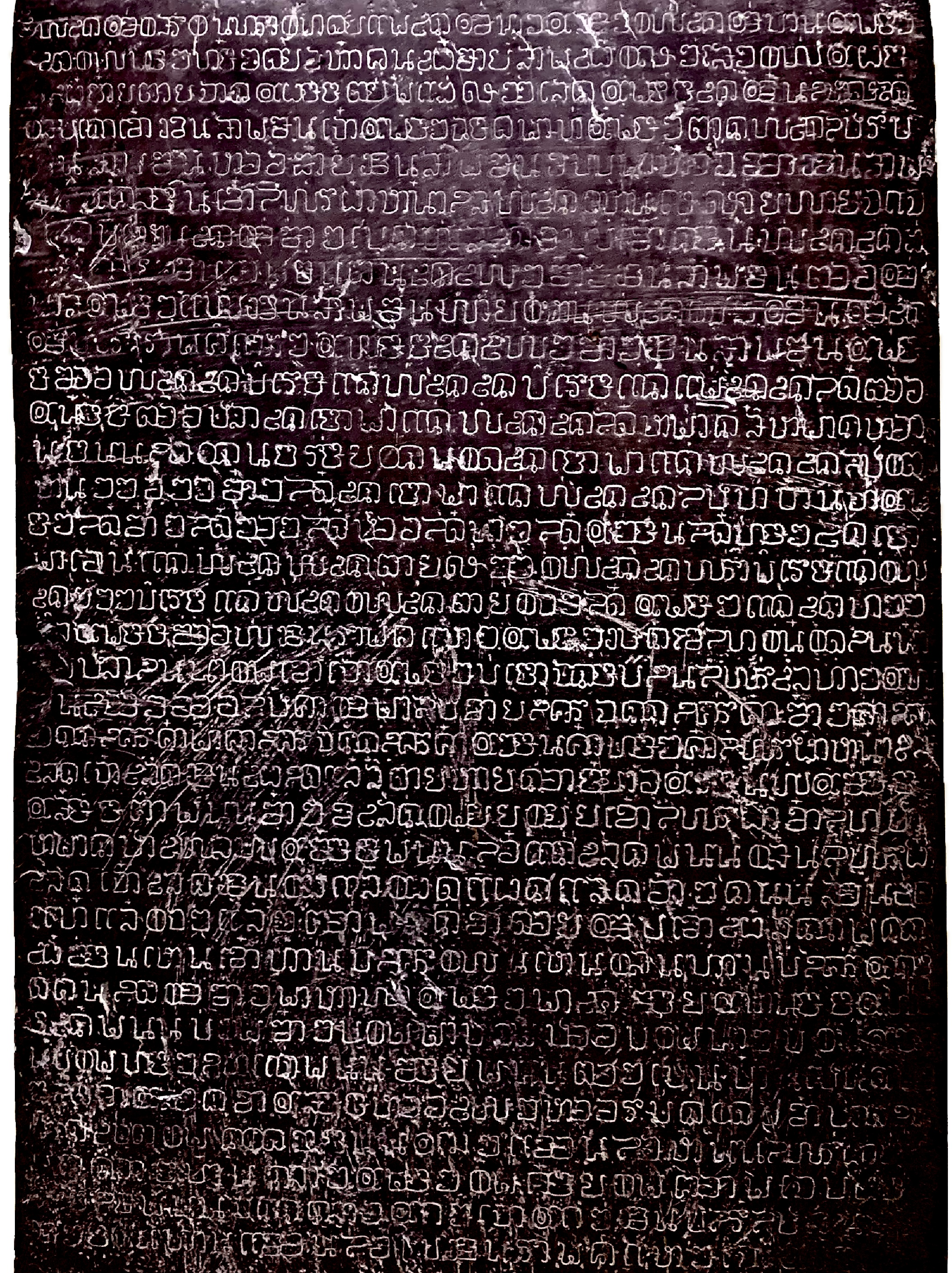
The first face of the inscription

Mongkut made initial studies of the inscription, and in 1836 established a commission, headed by monk-Prince Roek (who would later become Supreme Patriarch Pavares Variyalongkorn), to handle its deciphering. In 1855, Mongkut (now king) presented a lithographic copy of the inscription, with annotations giving partial translations and a letter explaining its significance, to the British envoy John Bowring, and another copy was presented to the French envoy Charles de Montigny in 1856.

The first attempted translation of the text into a Western language was published by the German polymath Adolf Bastian in 1864. French missionary Père Schmitt published his translation in 1884 and 1885, with further revisions in 1895 and 1898. Also in 1898, the first Thai-language work on the inscription was published in the Vajirañāṇa Magazine. A transliteration of the entire inscription into the modern Thai script was printed as a pamphlet for Crown Prince Vajiravudh's tour of the old Sukhothai Kingdom in 1908.

In 1909, Cornelius Beach Bradley, Professor of Rhetoric at the University of California and an expert on the Siamese language, published an English-language translation of the inscription, which was later described as "the first reasonably satisfactory translation" of the inscription into a Western language. An authoritative transcription and translation (into French) was later made by George Cœdès, and published in 1924. Revisions published by A.B. Griswold and Prasert na Nagara in 1971 and the National Library in 1977 improved upon Cœdès's version, and Winai Pongsripian published the most recent Thai transliteration in 2009.

== Text ==
My father's name was Si Inthărathĭt. My mother's name was Lady Süăng. My elder brother's name was Ban Müăng. We, elder and younger born from the same womb were five; brothers three, sisters two.

— Opening lines of the inscription, as translated by Cornelius Beach Bradley

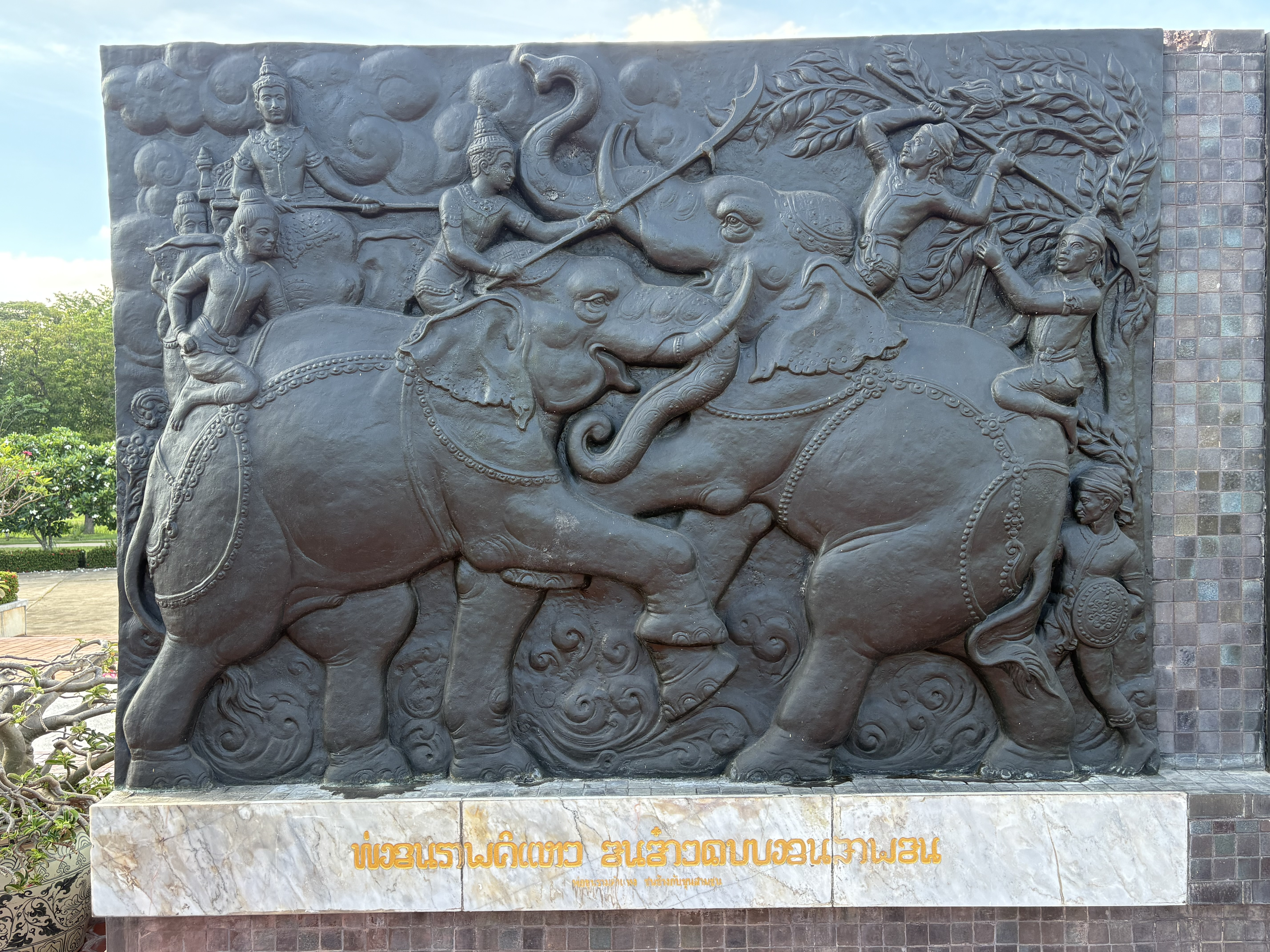
A modern relief accompanying a section of the inscription stating "I engaged Khŭn Sam Chŏn in elephant-duel. I myself thrust Khŭn Sam Chŏn's elephant"

The inscription contains 35 lines of text on its first and second sides, and 27 on the third and fourth. The script used, now known as the Sukhothai script, is an early form of the Thai script (also known as Siamese), which differs vastly from modern Thai and bears some resemblance to ancient Khmer, from which it is considered to have been adapted. Most significantly, the script contains no above- or below-line vowel marks, a feature seen in later Sukhothai inscriptions and modern Thai, as well as earlier Indic scripts.

The text consists of three sections written continuously without distinct breaks. The first (lines 1–18 of the first side), which is written in the first person, tells the personal history of Ram Khamhaeng's early life up until his becoming ruler. The second (line 18 of the first side to line 11 of the fourth side) describes various aspects of the city of Sukhothai and its customs, including its abundance, people's freedoms, the ruler's justice, religious practices, and physical and geographical features. It ends by telling of Ram Khamhaeng's installation of a stone throne in the year 1214 of the Saka era (MS; corresponding to 1292 CE), enshrinement of relics at Si Satchanalai in MS 1207 (1285 CE) and his invention of the script in MS 1205 (1283 CE). The section refers to Ram Khamhaeng by name throughout. The third section (lines 11–27 of the fourth side) contains praise of the king and describes the reach of his kingdom. This final epilogue, which may have served as a eulogy, is written in a different hand, with some differences in spelling, indicating that it was most likely a later addition.

According to Cœdès, the inscription was probably made to commemorate Ram Khamhaeng's installation of the stone throne in 1292, and this is the year to which it is generally dated. The inscription, which paints a picture of a plentiful kingdom ruled paternally by a benevolent king, was extremely influential in the development of Thai historiography. Based on works by Prince Damrong Rajanubhab during the 1910s–1920s, Sukhothai came to be regarded as the first Thai capital, a golden age during which Thai values flourished (as opposed to later Khmer-influenced Ayutthaya). This official view is taught in schools and formed the core of mainstream Thai history-writing throughout the 20th century.

== Controversy about authenticity ==
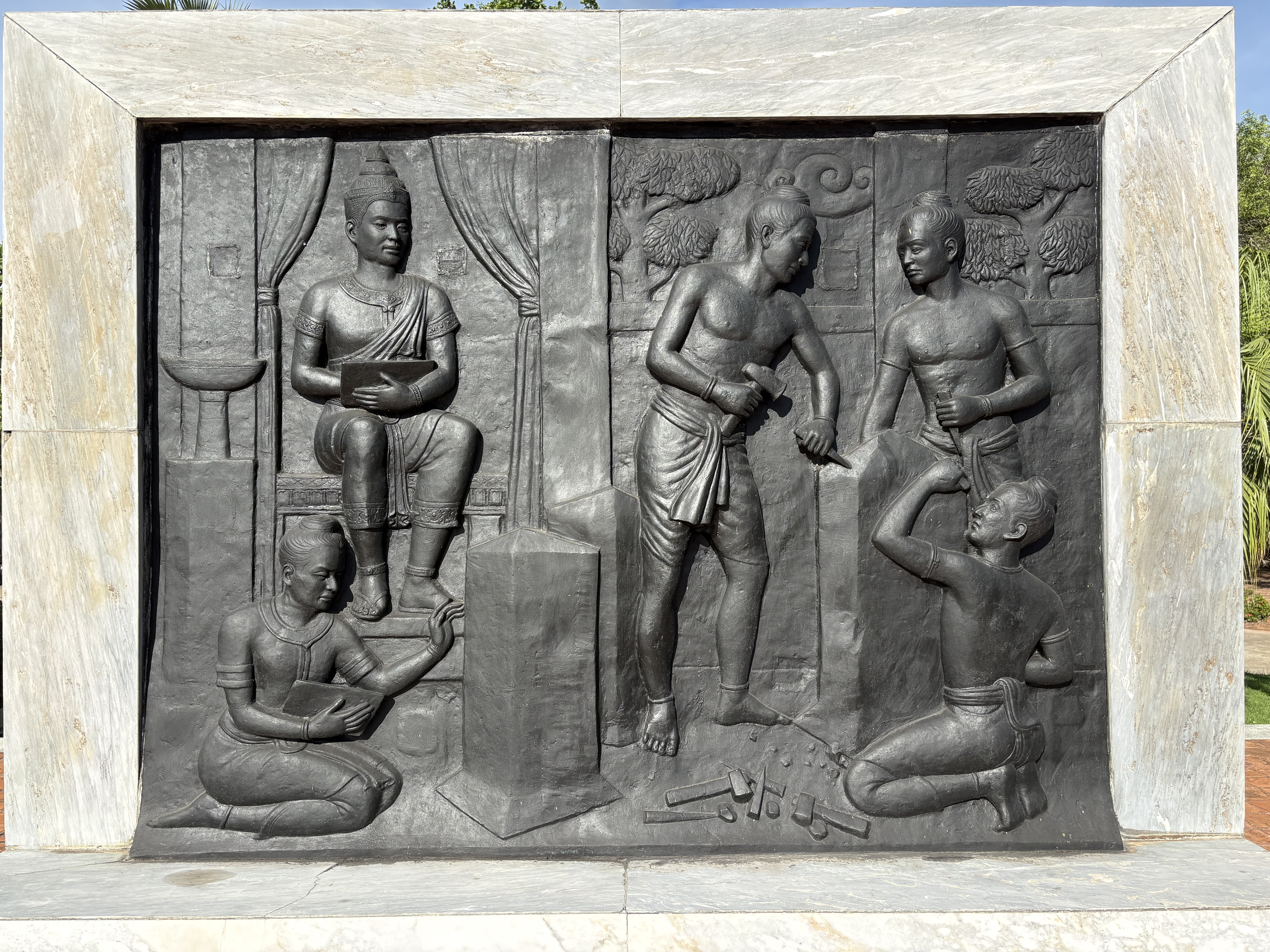
A relief at King Ramkhamhaeng the Great Monument in Sukhothai Historical Park, depicting Ramkhamhaeng overseeing of the creation of the inscription

In July 1987, historian Michael Vickery presented a paper titled "The Ram Khamhaeng Inscription: A Piltdown Skull of Southeast Asian History?" at the International Conference on Thai Studies at the Australian National University, in which he drew together the arguments made by himself and others casting doubt on the authenticity of the inscription. These included the script used in the inscription, its vocabulary, and its content. His position was supported, most notably, by art historian Piriya Krairiksh, who published, in Thai in August 1988, further arguments that the stele was a forgery by Mongkut himself. The claims—shocking for the implication that most of Thai history would have to be rewritten—led to intense, often heated, scholarly debate, joined by dozens of academics both making rebuttals as well as giving support. Numerous seminars were held, and the debate continued through several publications, including a special volume (in Thai) published by Art & Culture (Silpa Wattanatham) magazine in 1988 and a compilation of English-language articles published in 1991 by the Siam Society.

Although counter-arguments were made to address the claims, and a 1990 analysis using scanning electron microscopy and energy-dispersive X-ray spectroscopy found the Ram Khamhaeng stele to be the same age (700–500 years) as four other Sukhothai inscriptions, several proponents remain convinced of the forgery theory, and the debate has not been definitively settled. Nevertheless, the inscription was successfully submitted to UNESCO's Memory of the World Programme, and was inscribed on its international register in 2003.

The intense scrutiny and analysis also led to a much richer body of scholarship on the inscription, and several new theories have been proposed regarding its purpose and the exact circumstances of its creation. However, while historian Barend Jan Terwiel observed that while "the Thai academic world showed a refreshing open-mindedness" in its response to the claims, the public has sometimes responded with hostility. A 2004 publication in a Thai newspaper by Piriya and British expatriate author Michael Wright (also a proponent of the forgery theory) led to angry protests in Sukhothai and threats by a politician to have them prosecuted for defaming the kings and harming national security.

== See also ==
- History of Thailand
- Piltdown Man, the hoax alluded to in Vickery's paper title
