= Ayutthaya Kingdom =

Siamese kingdom in Southeast Asia (1351–1767)

Ayutthaya Kingdom อาณาจักรอยุธยา (Thai)
- 1351–1767
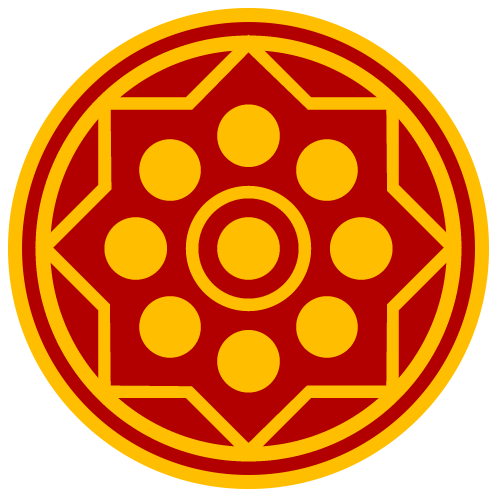
- Trade flag (1351–1767) Seal (1657–1688)

- Capital: Ayutthaya (1351–1463, 1488–early 1680s, 1688–1767); Phitsanulok (principal capital: 1463–c. 1488, secondary capital until c. 1590); Lopburi (early 1680s–1688)
- Common languages: Old Thai – official 1351–late 17th century; Early Modern Thai – official during late 17th century.; Mon – early common language; Khmer – early prestige language; spoken among ethnic Khmer; Malay – diplomatic language (predominant especially prior to the 16th century); spoken among ethnic Malays; Persian – diplomatic language (16th century; 1660s–1670s); Portuguese – diplomatic language (predominant from early 16th century); Various Chinese dialects (late Ayutthaya period; spoken among ethnic Chinese)
- Religion: Majority: Theravada Buddhism; Minority: Hinduism, Roman Catholicism, Islam
- Demonym: Krung Tai • Tai
- Government: Mandala kingdom: City-state confederation (1351–15th century); Mandala confederation (15th century–1600); Mercantile absolutism (1600–1767)
- Monarch
  - 1351–1369 (first): Uthong
  - 1758–1767 (last): Ekkathat
- Viceroy
  - 1438–1448 (first): Ramesuan (II)
  - 1757–1758 (last): Phonphinit
- Historical era: Post-classical era, early modern era
  - First tributary embassy to China: 1292 (Note: Before Ayutthaya's official foundation date. Ayutthaya was first referred to as "Xian" in Chinese records.)
  - Kingdom official establishment: 4 March 1351
  - Lopburi and Suphanburi rivalry: 1370–1409
  - Union with the Northern Cities: 1378–1569 (Note: "Northern Cities" (Mueang Nua) is often used by Thai historians to refer to Sukhothai and Phitsanulok.)
  - Vassal of the Toungoo dynasty: 1564–68, 1569–84
  - Golden Age of Ayutthaya: 1605–1767
  - Invasions from Konbaung: 1759–60, 1765–67
  - Fall of Ayutthaya: 7 April 1767

Area
  - Total: 400,000 km^{2} (150,000 sq mi)

Population
  - c. 1600: ~2,500,000
- Currency: Cowrie shell; Photduang
Preceded by
Northern Cities
Lopburi
Suphanburi
Phip Phli
Xiān
Succeeded by
Thonburi Kingdom
Phimai
Phitsanulok
Sawangburi
Nakhon Si Thammarat
- Today part of: Thailand; Myanmar; Malaysia; Cambodia; China; Laos; Vietnam

The Ayutthaya Kingdom (Note: /ɑːˈjuːtəjə/; Thai: (อาณาจักร)อยุธยา, RTGS: (Anachak) Ayutthaya, IAST: Ayudhyā or Ayodhyā, pronounced [(ʔāː.nāː.tɕàk) ʔà.jút.tʰá.jāː]) or the Empire of Ayutthaya was a Thai kingdom that existed in Southeast Asia from 1351 to 1767, centered around the city of Ayutthaya, in Siam, or present-day Thailand. European travellers in the early 16th century called Ayutthaya one of the three great powers of Asia alongside Vijayanagara and Ming China. (Note: Although the Chinese chronicles recognise the kingdom as one of its tributary states.) Ayutthaya is considered the precursor of modern Thailand.

The name derives from the Sanskrit Ayodhya, by way of the Ramakien, Thailand's national epic. The kingdom emerged in the late 13th and 14th centuries from a mandala of four maritime city-states in the lower Chao Phraya valley, including Ayodhya, Lavo, Phrip Phri, and Suphannaphum. The early kingdom was a maritime confederation oriented to post-Srivijaya maritime Southeast Asia, raiding it and drawing tribute from it. Two centuries of organization from the Northern Cities and a shift to a hinterland state followed, after which Ayutthaya centralized. From 1569 to 1584 it was a vassal of Toungoo Burma, then regained independence. In the 17th and 18th centuries it became a centre of international trade and its culture flourished. Under Narai (r. 1657–1688) Persian and then European influence was strong, and an embassy went to the court of Louis XIV in 1686. The late period saw the French and English leave and the Chinese rise, and has been called a "golden age" of Siamese culture, with Chinese trade and the introduction of capitalism into Siam continuing to grow in the centuries after the kingdom fell.

Ayutthaya's failure to settle a peaceful order of succession, and the arrival of capitalism, undermined the organization of its elite and the bonds of labour control on which its army and administration rested. In the mid-18th century, the Burmese Konbaung invaded Ayutthaya in 1759–1760 and 1765–1767. In April 1767, after a 14-month siege, the city fell and was destroyed, ending the 417-year-old kingdom. Siam recovered quickly, and within fifteen years the seat of authority had moved to Thonburi and Bangkok.

== Toponymy ==
=== Foreign names ===
In foreign accounts, Ayutthaya was called "Siam" but people of Ayutthaya called themselves Tai, and their kingdom Krung Tai (กรุงไท) meaning 'Tai country' (กรุงไท). The Fra Mauro map of the world, made in circa 1450, features Ayutthaya city under the Latin name "Scierno". This name was derived from the Persian "Shahr-I-Naw", meaning 'New City'. Early Iberian and Italian sources preserve several related variant spellings that also appear to refer to Ayutthaya, including forms such as Cernouem and Cernomé in Portuguese and Spanish compilations, and Xarnauz and Sarnau in other accounts. A handwritten nautical chart attributed to Vesconte de Maggiolo (c. 1508) labels Ayutthaya as Zerena. Some early Portuguese descriptions characterize Xarnauz as a "Christian" kingdom, a wording that may reflect European assumptions about non-Muslim states rather than local religion.

It was also referred to as Iudea (and Iudiad) in a c. 1662–1663 bird's-eye view painting of Ayutthaya attributed to Johannes Vingboons, commissioned by the Dutch East India Company. Alternative spelling is Iudia in a 1683 illustration by Alain Mallet.

=== Official name ===
The capital city of Ayutthaya is officially known as Krung Thep Dvaravati Si Ayutthaya (กรุงเทพทวารวดีศรีอยุธยา), as documented in historical sources. The Dvaravati element of that style is attested from the Ayutthaya period into the early Rattanakosin period. The preambles to three sections of the Three Seals Law, those on witnesses, on royal legislation, and on ordeal by water or fire, give the capital as Krung-deb-dvāravatī-śrī-ayudhyā-mahātilakabhaba-nabaratana-rājadhānī-purīramya (กรุงเทพทวารวดีศรีอยุธยา มหาดิลกภพ นพรัตน์ราชาธาณีบูรีรมย์). The same pairing appears in a letter from the governor of Tenasserim to the Danish court in 1620, in the Thai text of the 1664 treaty with the Dutch East India Company, in a Pāli letter to Kandy in 1757, in the chronicle compiled by Somdet Phra Phonarat at Wat Pho, and as late as 1842 in an inscription set up in Cambodia by Chaophraya Bodindecha.

The name was not used consistently, however: other sections of the same law code use forms of Ayutthaya without Dvāravatī, as do the Ratanabimbavaṃsa (1429), the Jinakalamali (c. 1516), the Yuan Phai and the Dansai inscription of 1560, and Prince Dhani Nivat, whose 1939 study in the Journal of the Siam Society remains the standard treatment of the question, observed that most official and literary works of the Ayutthaya and Bangkok periods name the capital simply as Ayutthaya or Krung Rattanakosin. Skilling has accordingly treated it as an open question whether the surviving instances preserve a continuous memory of Dvaravati or represent a later literary and diplomatic revival of the name. Even though Baker and Pasuk regard the use of Dvāravatī in Ayutthaya's official titles as a possible invention of tradition, a Burmese inscription on a bronze gun captured at the city's fall in 1767 also identifies Siam as Dvāravatī. This provides independent evidence for the use of the name for Siam at the end of the Ayutthaya period.

== History ==
=== Menam basin before Ayutthaya ===
==== Political geography ====
In the early second millennium, the lower central plain was anchored by Lavo to the east and Suphannabhum, a former Dvaravati centre, to the west, with Chen Li Fu between them. Lavo, conventionally described as under Angkorian suzerainty, occupied the eastern basin, while Suphannabhum in the west shows Angkorian cultural influence that need not imply direct political or military control. Evidence for varying degrees of Angkorian political and cultural involvement includes Suryavarman I's campaigns in the Kra Isthmus, Khmer-influenced architecture, the place of local elites in the Khmer hierarchy, and Jayavarman VII's patronage of cities in Ratchaburi and Phetchaburi. Kanjanajuntorn and colleagues nonetheless find the strongest Bayon influence in the Mae Klong valley, at Mueang Kosi Narai, Wat Maha That Ratchaburi and Wat Kamphaeng Laeng, while Dvaravati forms persisted along the Tha Chin, including Suphanburi. The evidence is consistent with Angkorian influence in the Mae Klong valley, but suggests selective borrowing rather than imposition.

Chen Li Fu, known from Chinese records and placed by Songsiri at Phraek, occupied the central position between Lavo and Suphannabhum. Songsiri notes, however, that archaeological evidence has not established when the settlement became its seat or whether it succeeded an earlier inland centre. It administered more than sixty settlements, appears in Chinese merchant records by about 1103–1115, and sent embassies to the Song in 1200, 1202 and 1205. Its ruler used the Angkorian title kamretan-an, and Chinese officials eventually excused the polity from further tribute. Songsiri proposes that after the first half of the 13th century its network developed into Suphannabhum, incorporating settlements around the Khwae rivers and the western basin, while Sing Buri and Phrom Buri belonged to the Lavo network.

==== Suzerainty and autonomy ====
Angkorian relationships with the basin polities have increasingly been interpreted in terms of a mandala, in which titles, cultural forms, and religious gifts circulated without necessarily implying sovereignty. The Preah Khan inscription of Jayavarman VII names cities of the western basin, including Suphanburi as Suvarnapura, Phetchaburi as Srijayavajrapuri, Mueang Kosi Narai as Samphukapatthana, and Ratchaburi as Srijayarajapura, but records no authority over them. Its record of sending Jayabuddhamahanatha images to western polities, together with the absence of Angkorian hospitals and fire houses west of Prachinburi, likewise suggests cultural diplomacy rather than direct rule.

The material and epigraphic record is similarly regionalized. Mueang Sing follows the Bayon style of Jayavarman VII's reign, but local irregularities and later inscriptions suggest local construction and modification rather than a wholly Angkorian foundation. Inscriptions from the basin, including the Dong Mae Nang Mueang inscription (K. 766) of 1167, the Phra Phuttharup Nak Prok inscription (K. 995) of 1213 and the Mueang Sing inscription, contain Thai lexical elements and script forms distinct from those of Phimai, Surin, Buriram and Angkor.

Titulature alone does not establish subordination. Wolters inferred from the Khmer title Kamrateng used by the rulers of Chen Li Fu that the polity was a Khmer dependency, but the comparable title used by the ruler of Phetchaburi in 1295, does not by itself demonstrate Khmer control. Songsiri notes that Chinese records apply kamrateng to rulers of Sukhothai, Phetchaburi and Chen Li Fu alike, whereas the settlements dependent on Chen Li Fu had rulers who did not bear the title. Charnvit Kasetsiri sees a Khmer-dominated east and broadly independent west as early as the eleventh century, while Vickery dates Angkor's loss of control later and interprets the fragmentation as part of internal Angkorian politics. By the mid-thirteenth century, however, the region's political autonomy is clearer: envoys sent to China presented their states independently, while local art styles increasingly diverged from the classical Khmer manner.

=== Pre-Ayutthaya period ===
On Kasetsiri's account, Ayutthaya emerged from the merger of four port polities of the lower basin: Lopburi, Suphanburi, Ayodhya and Phetchaburi. Each had sent missions to China in its own name, including Suphanburi to the Song in 1180 and Phetchaburi to the Yuan in 1294, with further missions to Vijayanagara between 1400 and 1500.

==== Ayodhya ====
The city that became Ayutthaya is known in the Thai chronicle tradition as Ayodhya (อโยธยา). The Northern Chronicle places its earliest settlement in the in the 930s–940s (Note: Calculated from the text given in the chronicle: "สิ้น 97 ปีสวรรคต ศักราชได้ 336 ปี พระยาโคดมได้ครองราชสมบัติอยู่ ณ วัดเดิม 30 ปี" which is transcribed as "…at the age of 97, he passed away in the year 336 of the Chula Sakarat. Phraya Kodom reigned in the Mueang Wat Derm for 30 years….") in the area around the Nong-sano Lake (หนองโสน), founded by Phuttha Sakhon (พระมหาพุทธสาคร), whose lineage was associated with Bang Pan in present-day Kamphaeng Phet. The settlement was then called Mueang Nong-sano (เมืองหนองโสน), and his son succeeded him in 974.

The son was subsequently deposed by Sindhob Amarin, also known as Phraya Kreak (พญาแกรก), ruler of Phraek or Indaprasthanagara, who brought Mueang Nong-sano under his authority; Lavo is likewise said to have come under his rule.

According to a later chronicle tradition, the Lavo court moved to the site in the 1080s. Narai I, son of Chandrachota of Lavo, was enthroned at Lavapura in 1082 and subsequently transferred his seat to Mueang Nong-sano, renaming it Ayodhya; the older capital thereafter became known as Lopburi. Proposed explanations for the move include changes in the course of the Lopburi River, political or religious divisions within the Lavo elite, and the recovery of Lavo from Angkorian influence by forces associated with Suphannabhum and Haripuñjaya.

Narai I died in 1087 without an heir, and nine amatya clans contested the throne until Phra Chao Luang prevailed in 1089. He married his only daughter to Sai Nam Peung, whose descendants are said to have ruled Ayodhya until 1351. A second line is interpreted by scholars as becoming connected to Ayodhya in 1205, when Uthong II, son of Phanom Thale Sri of Chen Li Fu–Phetchaburi, married a daughter of Dhammikaraja, who belonged to the earlier line. His descendants subsequently ruled Ayodhya for more than a century.

Rulers of Mueang Nong-sano and Ayodhya before 1351
Ruler	Reign	Note
As Mueang Nong-sano
Phra Maha Phuttha Sakhon	930s/940s–974	Of a lineage from Bang Pan; founded the town
Gotraboṅ	974–?	Deposed by Sindhob Amarin
Sindhob Amarin	?–996	Ruler of Indaprasthanagara; held both towns but ruled from Phraek
—N/a	996–1082	Under Mueang Phraek
As Ayodhya, from the 1080s
Narai I	1082–1087	Son of Chandrachota of Lavo; enthroned at Lavapura and transferred the seat to Mueang Nong-sano in the mid-1080s
Contested among nine amatya clans		1087–1089
Phra Chao Luang	1089–1111	Winner of the contest among the nine amatya clans
Sai Nam Peung	1111–1165	Son-in-law of the preceding
Dhammikaraja	1165–1224?	
Uthong II	1224?–1253	Son-in-law of the preceding; of the Phrip Phri–Phraek Si Racha line
Jayasena	1253–1289	Son-in-law of the preceding; abdicated
Suvarnaraja	1289–1301	Adopted son of the preceding
Dhammaraja	1301–1310	Son-in-law of the preceding
Baramaraja	1310–1344	Brother of the preceding; abdicated
Uthong V	1344–1369	Son of the preceding

==== Other three port polities ====
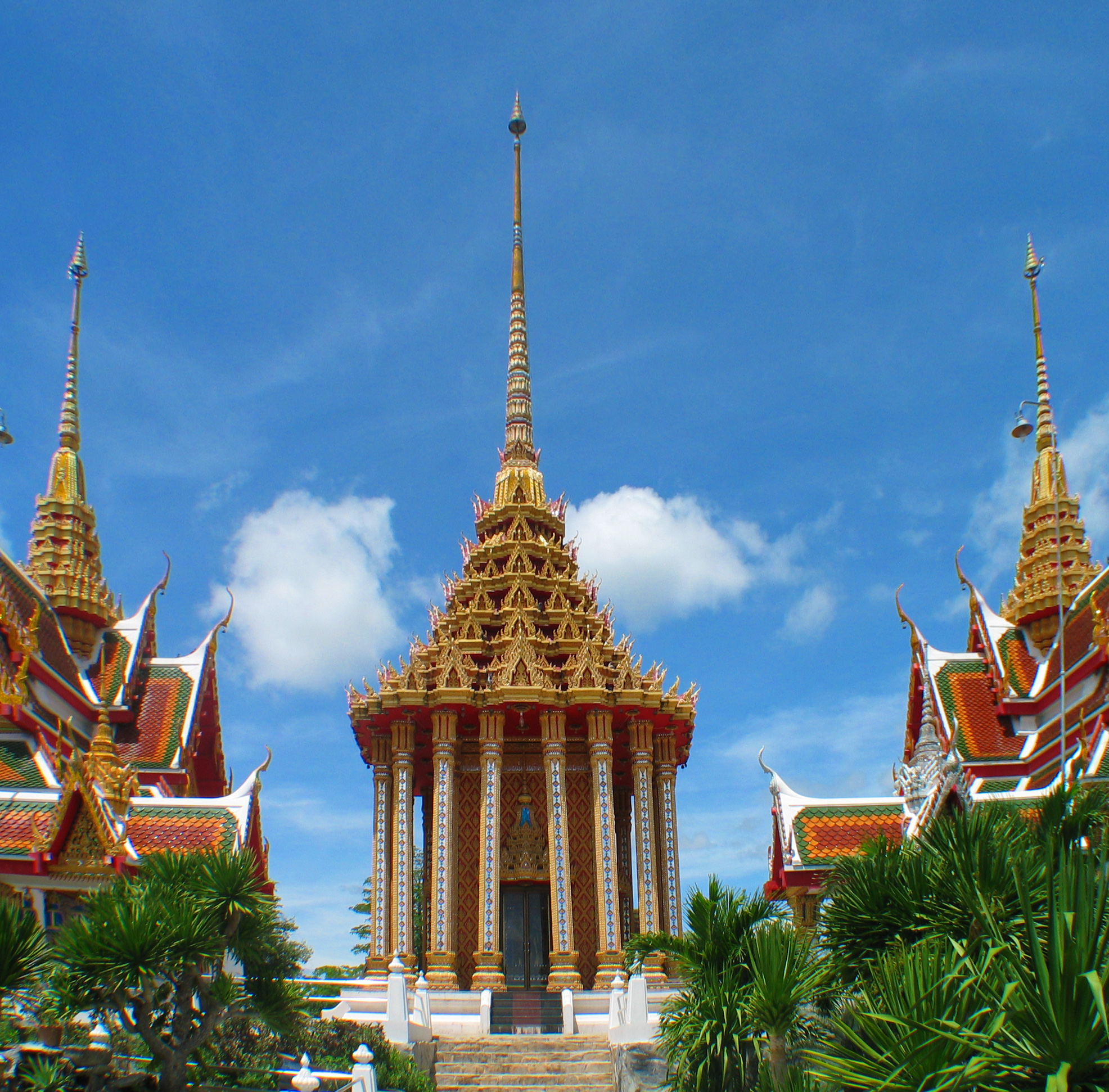
Wat Khao Phra Si Sanphetchayaram, which the Northern Chronicle state was initially built during the reign of Pansa of Suphannaphum.

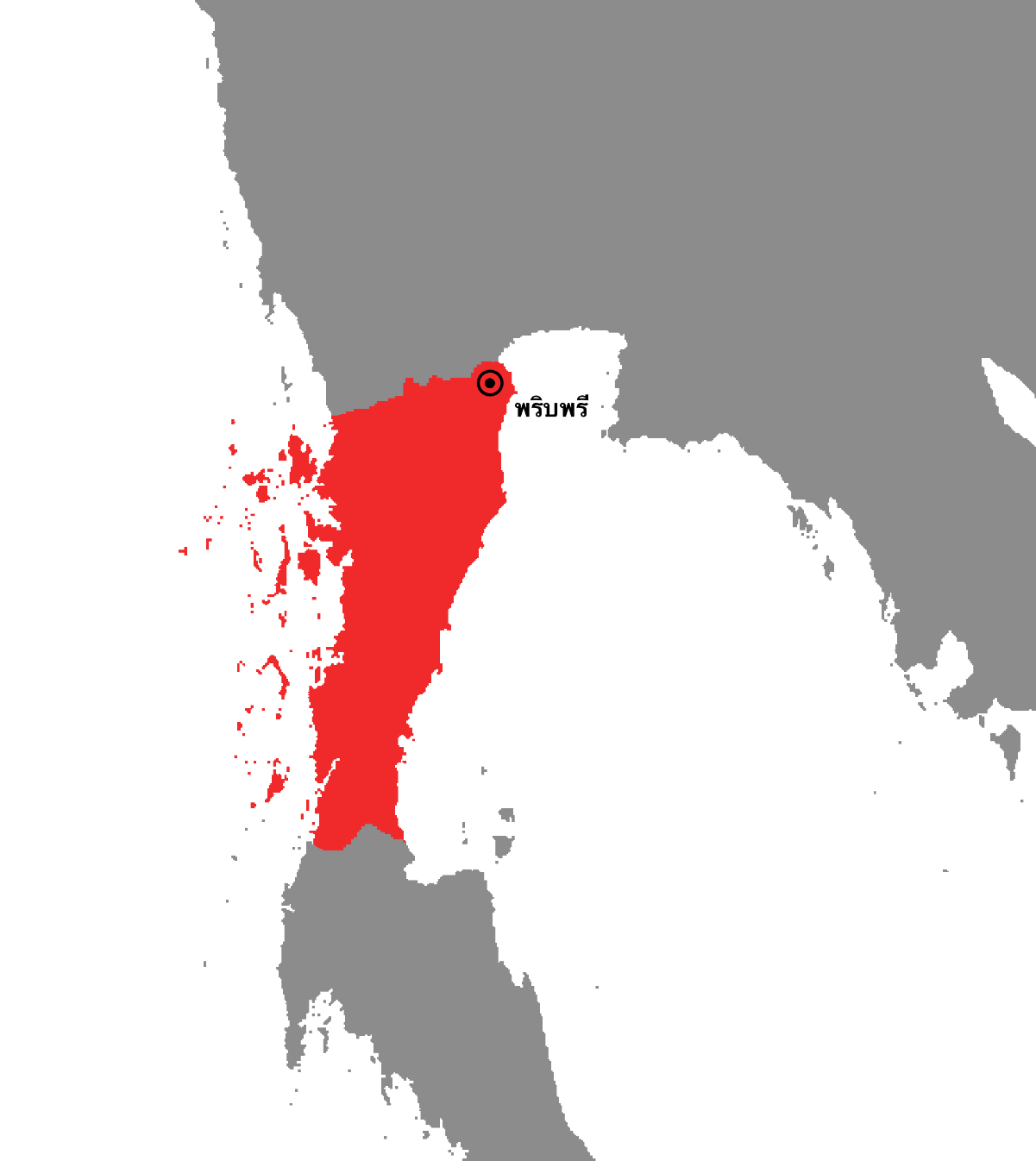
Proposed extent of the Phetchaburi polity in the late 12th century.

The three remaining polities of Kasetsiri's account had ruling lines of their own. At Suphannabhum, Pansa, a son of Balaraj of Dvaravati Nakhon Pathom, is said to have ruled at Phanthumburi (พันธุมบุรี) on the left bank of the Tha Chin before moving his seat to Uthong, dying in 1006, and was followed by Ramapandita (1006 – c. 1046) and Anga Indra (c. 1046–1081). The throne then passed to Kar Tayy, a Pagan noble, who ruled until about 1121 and moved the principal centre back to Phanthumburi, thereafter called Songphanuri. Mueang Uthong was abandoned during the 12th century, and Songphanuri stood vacant until Uthong I took it in 1163, conventionally the start of the Xiān period at Suphanburi. Baker and Pasuk attribute the abandonment of Mueang Uthong to a shift in the river that cut the town off from easy access to the gulf, and suggest that its people moved some 30 kilometres north-east to Suphan Buri, whose strictly rectangular moat of 1.9 by 0.7 kilometres and central relic stupa in Angkorian style may both date to the 12th century.

Phrip Phri, at present-day Phetchaburi, was re-established in the same generation by Uthong I's brother Phanom Thale Sri, dated 1157/58 in the Instructions Given to the Siamese Envoys Sent to Portugal of 1684 and 1188 in Du Royaume de Siam. The 1684 Instructions count four kings over 163 years, the last of them Uthong V. Phanom Thale Sri extended his reach north to Mueang Phraek in 1180, appointing his preceptor to govern, over territory that also covered the region proposed for Chen Li Fu; to the south, a dispute with Tambralinga in 1196 ended in negotiation and a lasting dynastic tie, which bore fruit late in the 13th century when princes of Phetchaburi revived that polity after its collapse, thereafter known as Nakhon Si Thammarat. Both were tributaries of Sukhothai between about 1283 and 1298 on the Ram Khamhaeng Inscription, and both broke away after Ramkhamhaeng's death. Phrip Phri's standing in Chinese eyes is telling: its ruler bore the Khmer-derived style Gan-mu-ding, yet the texts call the place chéng (城, "city" or "city-state") rather than guó (國, "country").

Lavo followed a separate course after Narai I moved the seat. Shridhammatripitaka of Ngoenyang Chiang Saen is thought to have seized Lopburi in 1106, after which it passed to Sri Dharmasokaraja I of Tambralinga–Suphannaphum in the 1110s and fell under Angkor in 1117; it recovered enough independence to send tribute to China in 1155, was retaken by Angkor under Jayavarman VII, and late in the century was governed by Nripendravarman, later enthroned at Angkor as Indravarman II. Five further tribute missions went to China between 1289 and 1299, and by the 1320s the seat is thought to have been held by the maternal grandfather of Ramesuan, Uthong V's son, which accounts both for the marriage by which Uthong V acquired Lavo and for Ramesuan's retreat there in 1370. Lavo was not fully incorporated into Ayutthaya's political order until 1388.

==== Xiān in Chinese and Vietnamese records ====
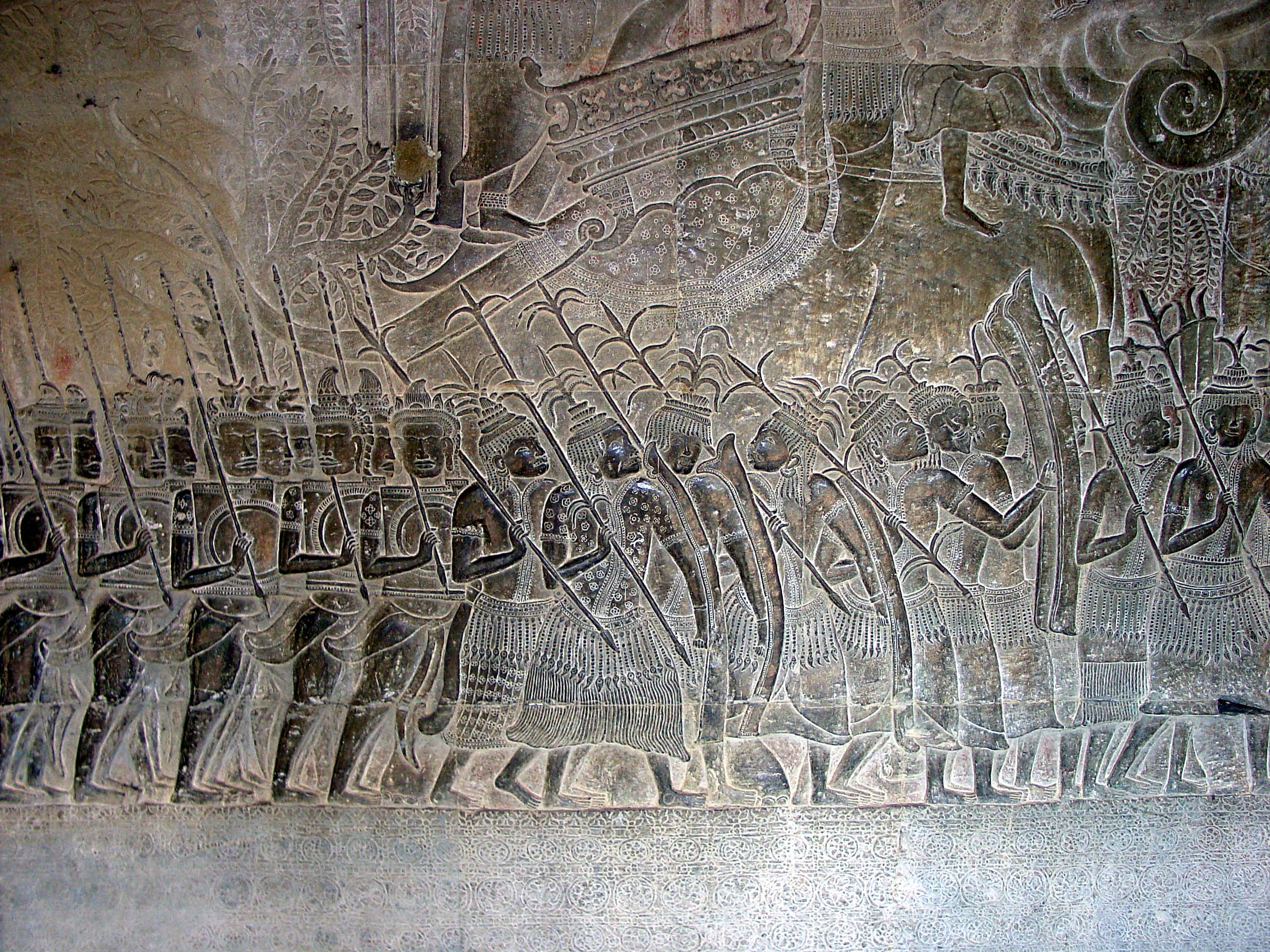
Siamese mercenaries of Xiān at Angkor Wat, 12th century; the Siamese later became Angkor's rival

Through this period the polity appears in foreign sources as Xiān (暹), from which the name Siam derives. The earliest surviving notices are Vietnamese. The Đại Việt sử ký toàn thư records merchants from Xiān reaching Hǎidōng in 1149 and seeking to trade and establish a post at Yún tún (雲屯), modern Vân Đồn, with further contacts in 1182, 1241, and 1360. In 1313–1315 Xiān attempted to attack Champa but was repulsed after Đại Việt intervened. The Ma Nhai inscription of 1335 likewise names Xiān among the polities bringing local products to the Trần court.

Chinese sources likewise place Xiān among the independent polities of mainland Southeast Asia. The Yuan sent a mission to Xiān in 1282, although its commander was killed in Champa before reaching his destination. Xiān sent its first embassy to the Yuan in 1292; after initial demands for submission, its king, Gan-mu-ding, appeared in person with tribute in 1295. G. H. Luce identified this ruler with the king of Pi-ch'a-pu-li, that is Phrip Phri. Further embassies followed through the early 14th century, while Lavo sent missions to the Yuan independently. Wang Dayuan's Daoyi Zhilue of 1351 describes Xiān as a trading polity supplying tropical products, while Zhou Daguan's account of Angkor in 1296–97 reports large numbers of Siamese at Yasodharapura, influence over Lavapura, and repeated conflict between Siamese and Khmer interests.

The identity of Xiān has been interpreted in several ways. Older scholarship identified it with the Sukhothai Kingdom or Suphanburi, while Chris Baker and Pasuk Phongpaichit argue that it referred to Ayodhya, noting that the Chinese later used the same name for Ayutthaya and that the Guangzhou gazetteer of 1297–1307 describes Xiān as controlling Shang-shui Su-gu-di, in which Su-gu-di is identified with Sukhothai. Vickery instead held that the Chinese term referred to the lower Chao Phraya basin as a whole, while Yoneo Ishii concluded that it could denote a group of port-polities around the Bay of Thailand, including Ayodhya and Suphanburi and possibly Ligor. The evidence therefore does not require Xiān to have denoted a single centralized kingdom throughout the period.

==== Archaeological and epigraphic evidence ====
The present island was shaped by a river system different from the modern one. The Lopburi River was formerly the main large stream, following a long meander around the settlement, while the Pa Sak and Chao Phraya lay farther away. Settlement occupied riverside levees and other slightly raised ground and was regularly exposed to flooding.

Archaeological evidence indicates a substantial settlement before 1351. Excavations beneath Wat Mahathat and nearby Wat Khun Mueang Chai have found structures predating the 1100s and pottery dating to the 1270s, while Khmer-style stones reused at Wat Mahathat may derive from an earlier structure. The presence of an earlier settlement is also reflected in textual and epigraphic evidence. The Tamnan mulasasana records monks at Ayutthaya in the 1320s, while the Luang Prasoet chronicle dates the Phananchoeng Buddha image to 1324/5 and the Sukhothai monk Si Sattha visited about 1344. Sujato, another Sukhothai monk, is likewise recorded as settling at Ayutthaya early in the 14th century after periods in Sri Lanka and Pagan. The Si Sattha inscription gives the city's name as Ayodhya Si Ramathepnakhon, associating it with the realm of Rama. The Wat Khao Kop inscription of the 14th–15th centuries and the Northern Chronicle preserve the related form Ayothaya Si Ram Thep Nakhon (อโยธยาศรีรามเทพนคร).

Other evidence is less securely connected with the pre-1351 settlement. An inscription of 937 (K.949) naming a dynastic line of Canasapura was recovered at Ayutthaya, although Skilling cautions that it may have been transported there later. A gold-leaf suphannabat from the crypt of Wat Ratchaburana, written in Khmer with Khom script and dated to about 1257, appoints Kamrateng Dhammabhinanda to the office of Sri Chandrabhanu Jayavaruddha Horathibodi. Chit Phumisak argued that it predated Ayutthaya and had been deposited in the crypt by the appointee's descendants when the prang was built in 1424. Phumisak also connected the office of Chandrabhanu with Tambralinga, arguing that the title and associated traditions were transferred north when Ayodhya brought its ruling house to the Chao Phraya court. The surviving evidence is less direct, however, and Chinese records do not record a Xiān campaign against Tambralinga.

Several sections of the later Three Seals Law preserve material attributed to before 1351, including the laws on slavery and debt and the closing portion of the Phra Aiyakan Betset (พระอัยการเบ็ดเสร็จ), which names Dhammikaraja as reigning king. Phumisak read its closing date as Shaka era 1156, or 1235. He dated section 3 of the Betset to 1343 and interpreted it as prohibiting retaliation and requiring compensation for injury to a straying animal. He contrasted this with the Mangrai Sat, which still permitted retaliation under specified circumstances.

Foreign traditions also preserve the name Ayodhya. The Burmese Hmannan Yazawin places a country called Ayoja to the south-east, associated with the Gywan, and Cœdès identified Ayoja with Ayudhya. Malay traditions likewise contain accounts of Siamese from Ayutthaya moving south into the Malay Peninsula before 1160.

==== Society before 1351 ====
The written record for the basin before 1351 is largely political and dynastic, with little information on social organisation. Phumisak, writing within a Marxist framework, argued that the lower valley consisted of small slave-holding states engaged in maritime trade and competition for regional primacy. He considered Lavo the longest-standing dominant polity, with the basin's most developed system of bound labour, while also describing it as a centre of learning and trade.

Contemporary Chinese accounts provide glimpses of Siamese society and economy. Zhou Daguan, writing at Angkor in 1296–97, noted that Siamese practised sericulture, produced textiles, and supplied skilled sewing labour, while also reporting that the population could be mobilised for warfare. Wang Dayuan, who travelled in the 1330s, described Xiān as dependent on Lavo for rice and capable of launching large naval expeditions against neighbouring polities. Lavo and Sumenbang also produced salt by boiling seawater.

Agriculture followed the seasonal flooding of the river, with rice sown according to the rise and fall of water levels rather than through conventional ploughing. The Daoyi Zhilue also records shared customs in Lavo and Xiān, including topknots, similar dress and the use of cowries, while noting that women in Lavo exercised considerable authority over economic and travel decisions.

=== The founding of 1351 ===
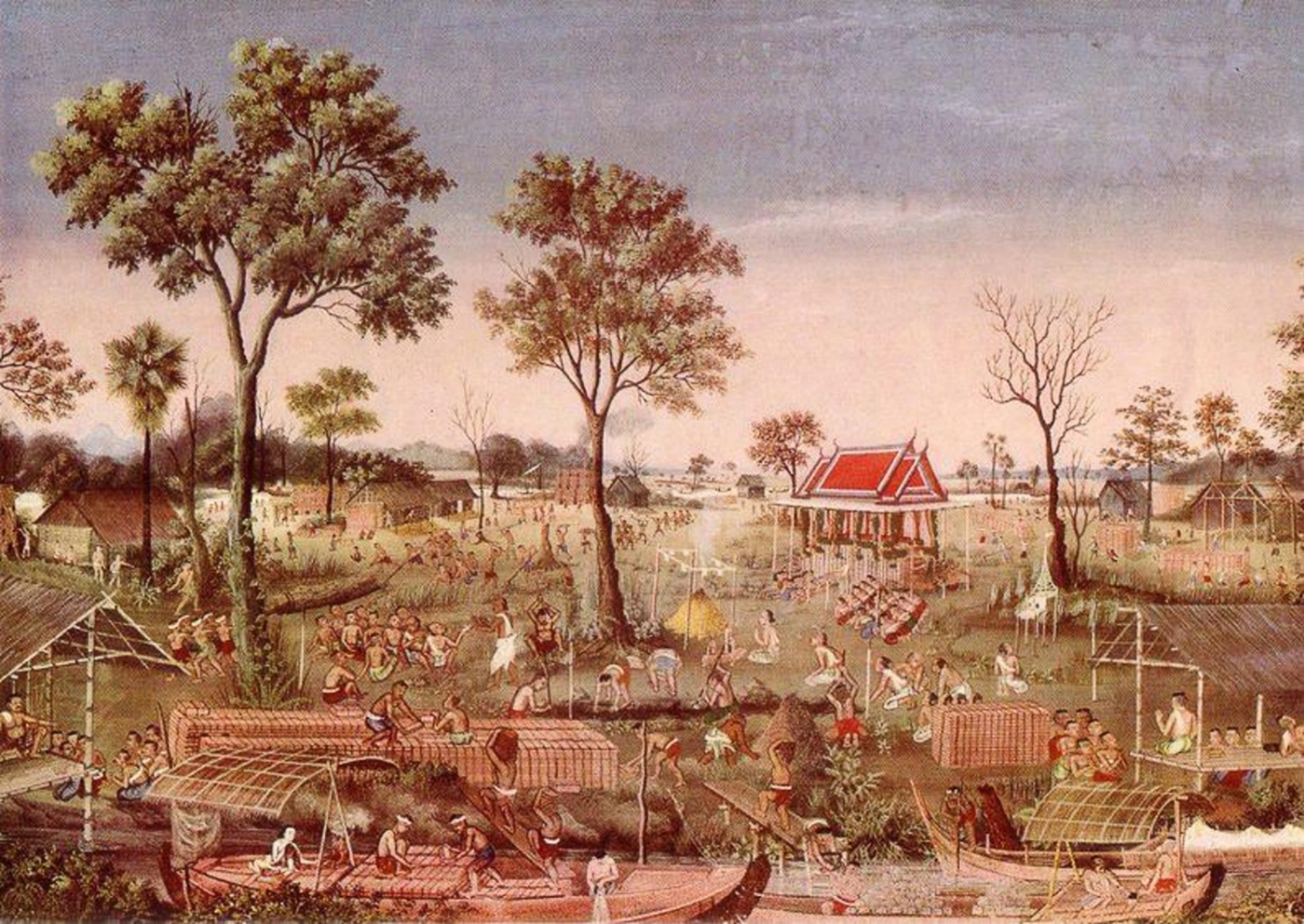
The founding of Ayutthaya by Ramathibodi I, painted by Nai Im in 1897 by decree of King Chulalongkorn

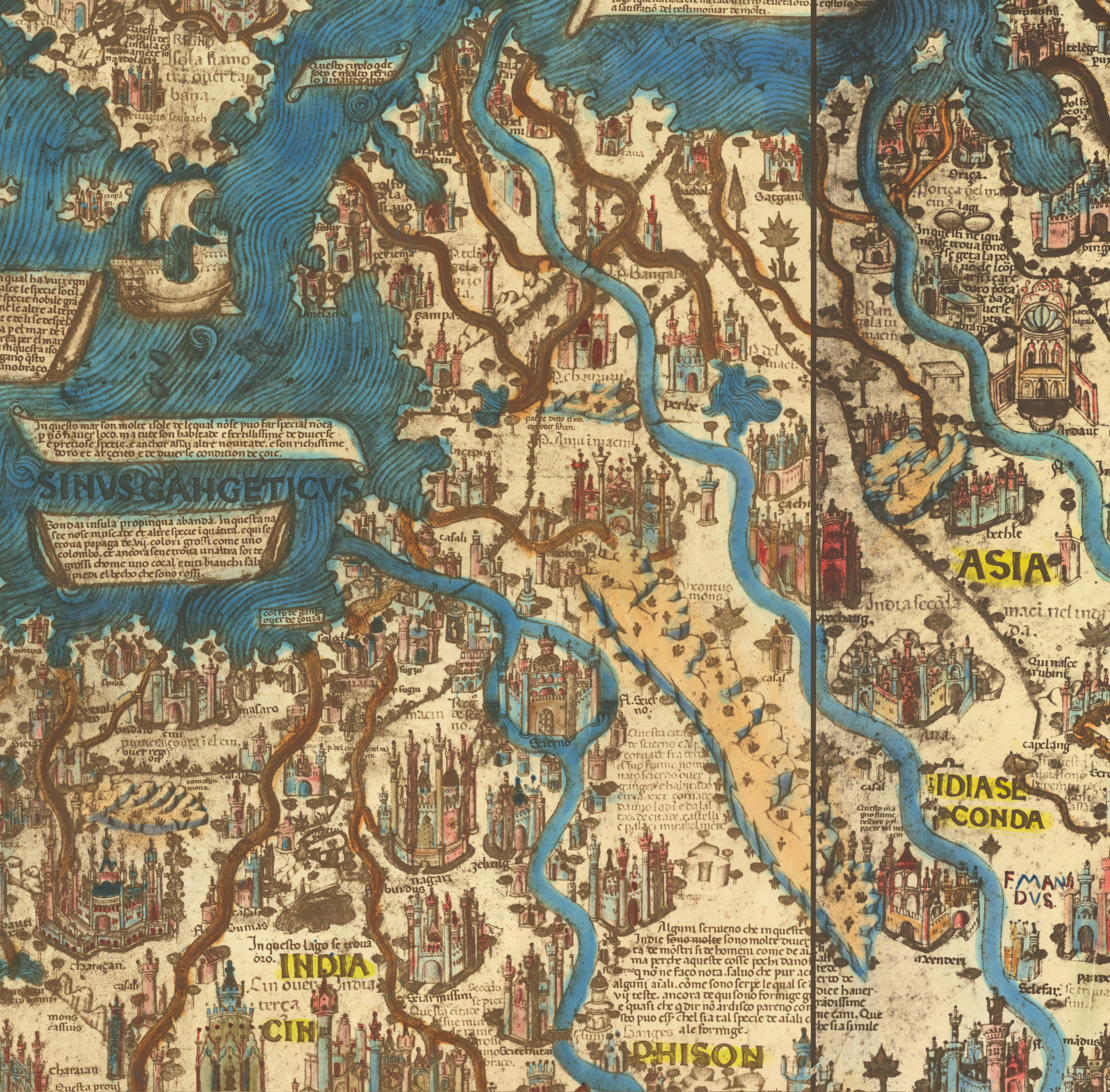
Ayutthaya on the Fra Mauro map (c. 1459) as "Scierno", from the Persian Shahr-i-Naw, meaning "New City"

Uthong V, son of Baramaraja, held Phetchaburi and Ayodhya by direct descent and acquired Suphannabhum and Lavo through marriage, bringing four major centres under one ruler. 4 March 1351 is conventionally given as the foundation of the Ayutthaya Kingdom. (Note: The date marks the transfer of the seat and the gathering of the four centres under one ruler, not the establishment of a city: Ayodhya appears in the chronicle tradition from the 930s or 940s.) Persian merchants knew the new centre as shahr-i naw (شهر نو), "new city", a name recorded on the Venetian Fra Mauro map of 1459. The settlement may have predated 1351: an analysis of the principal stupa of Wat Mahathat, based on photographs taken before its collapse, suggests a 12th- or 13th-century date, although the dating remains uncertain.

The union did not immediately produce a stable dynasty. In the Lavo account, Uthong V co-founded the city with the ruler of Suphannabhum, later Borommarachathirat I, and the two lines contested the throne for much of the following half-century. Ramesuan lost Ayutthaya to Borommarachathirat in 1370 but recovered it from Thong Lan in 1388, bringing Ayutthaya and Lavo under one ruler. The Suphannabhum line regained the throne under Intharacha in 1408, after which the Lavo Uthong line was reduced to a noble clan.

Uthong's origins are difficult to reconstruct, partly because the chronicles conflate different figures named Uthong from different periods. Baker and Pasuk record several traditions concerning his identity, including a northern Thai prince, a Chinese prince or merchant, a Indaprastha noble, a ruler from one of the Gulf cities, and a Chola. Gumpoan Champaphan counts seven such traditions and holds only four of them tenable: Phetchaburi, Ayodhya, Lopburi, and Indaprastha. These traditions may not all concern the founder of Ayutthaya: Uthong I, Uthong II and Uthong V are distinct figures whom later chronicles frequently conflate, carrying episodes from one period into another. (Note: Uthong I, Uthong II, and Uthong V are distinct figures whom the chronicles frequently conflate. The motif of flight from an epidemic to found a new capital, for instance, is attached both to Uthong II in 1205 and to Uthong V in 1351.) The resulting traditions have made the historical identity and origins of Uthong V difficult to establish. Other scholars argue that Ayodhya was already an important commercial centre several centuries before 1351.

Before the union, the lower valley had developed several competing mandalas. Archaeological evidence from the 12th and 13th centuries indicates migration from neighbouring regions, including Khmer from the east, Mon from the west and Tai–Mon from the north, while centres such as Suphannabhum, Phetchaburi, Sukhothai and Ayodhya developed their own spheres of influence.

=== Early maritime dominance ===
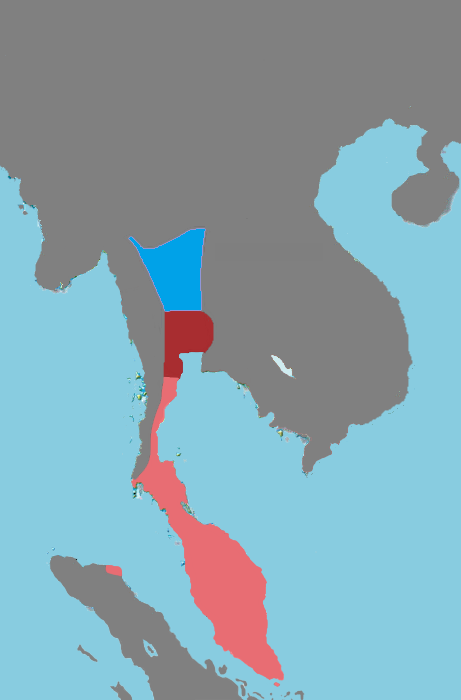
Ayutthaya heartland (red), invaded territories (light red), Northern Cities (blue), 14th century

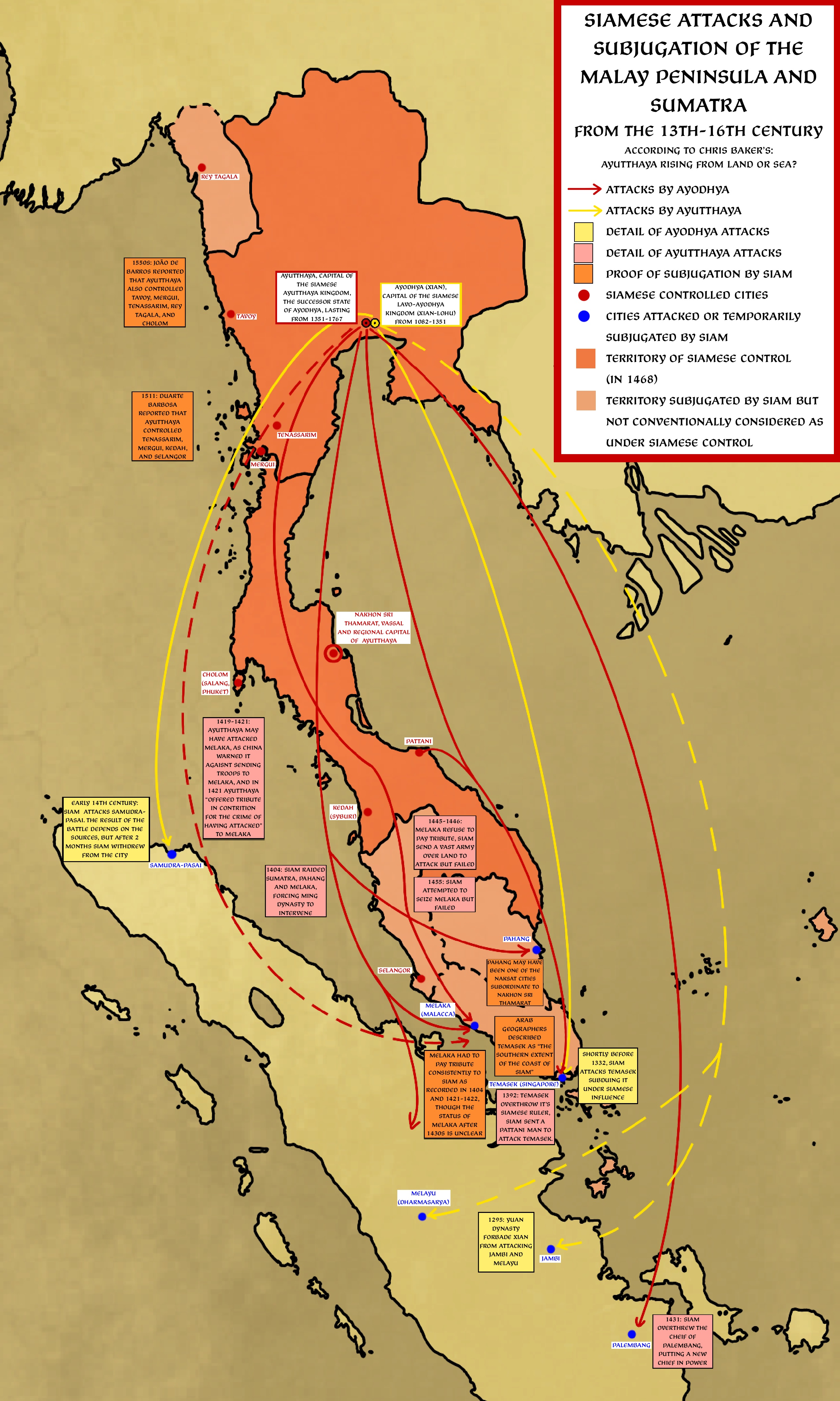
Ayutthaya expansion into the Malay Peninsula and Sumatra, 13th–16th centuries

In the 1290s through to the 1490s, Ayutthaya sent forces down to the peninsula and demanded tribute from the Malay principalities down to Temasek (Singapura; modern Singapore) and Sumatra. The early Ayutthaya polity was a maritime-oriented confederation, more in line with the Malay polities of Maritime Southeast Asia than with states inland like Sukhothai and the Northern Cities. Muslim and European maps labeled the Malay Peninsula to the Tenasserim as part of Ayutthaya in the 15th and early 16th centuries. Baker and Pasuk set the polity of these years beside the other trading centres that rose after Srivijaya, whose rulers were merchants rather than warriors, who held only the land they needed to feed themselves, and who left little or nothing as inscriptions. Early Ayutthaya did not keep records and their early dynastic chronology is likely fabricated by later Ayutthaya elites writing their histories: the early chronology in the palace chronicles does not correlate with the Ayutthaya temple chronicles nor the Chinese court chronicles.

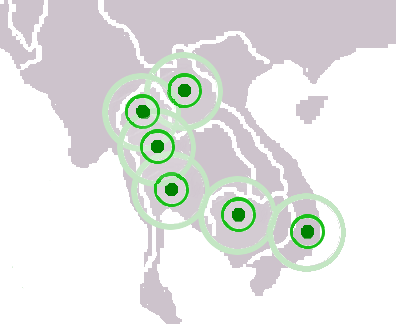
Intersecting mandalas circa 1360: from north to south: Lan Xang, Lanna, Northern Cities, Ayutthaya, Angkor and Champa

The integrity of the patchwork of cities of the early Ayutthaya Kingdom was maintained largely through familial connections under the mandala system. King Uthong had his son, Prince Ramesuan, the ruler of Lopburi, his brother, the ruler of Praek Sriracha (in modern Chainat), styled Somdet Phra Si Rachathirat (สมเด็จพระศรีราชาธิราช); and Khun Luang Pa-ngua, the ruler of Suphanburi, who became his brother-in-law through his own marriage into the Suphannabhum house. The king would appoint a prince or a relative to be the ruler of a city, and a city that was ruled by a prince was called Muang Look Luang (เมืองลูกหลวง). Each city ruler swore allegiance and loyalty to the King of Ayutthaya, but also retained certain privileges. Ayutthaya worked the Ming tribute system harder than any other sender. It despatched sixty missions between 1369 and 1429, against Champa's forty-eight, and the Ming Shih lists forty-four tribute goods from Siam, the longest such list. Ryukyu's Rekidai Hoan records sixty-four ships sent to Ayutthaya between 1425 and 1570, against twenty to Melaka and six to Java.

Early Ayutthayan politics was marked by rivalry between the two dynasties; the Uthong dynasty based on Lopburi and the Suphannabhum dynasty based on Suphanburi. Older accounts describe Ayutthaya as conquering Sukhothai and Angkor. Baker instead reads its growth as a merger of the cities at the head of the peninsula, extending northward along the Chao Phraya River basin to the Northern Cities. Each house also dealt separately with China. In 1373 the Hongwu emperor rejected two Siamese embassies at once, one sent for the reigning Borommarachathirat and one on behalf of the deposed Ramesuan's mother.

Within a few years of its founding, the young kingdom went to war with Angkor. Ramathibodi I first sent Prince Ramesuan, ruler of Lopburi, against the Khmer capital, but the force was routed by a counter-attack led by the Cambodian uparaja, and another royal son, Phra Si Sawat, was killed. Ramathibodi then called on his brother-in-law, Khun Luang Pa-ngua of Suphanburi, for reinforcement. The combined army captured Nakhon Thom (Yasodharapura), taking captives and goods rather than annexing the city; Cambodian tradition records that King Lampong Racha died in the battle. The chronicles give the cause only as the moment "the Khom turned traitor" (ขอมแปรพักตร์).

To the north-east, Fa Ngum founded Lan Xang in 1353. He and Ramathibodi I settled a frontier along Khao Sam Sao and Phu Phraya Pho (Dong Phraya Fai), the two addressing each other as descendants of a common ancestor, Khun Borom.

The culture of early Ayutthaya was described by Ma Huan, a scribe on Zheng He's voyages, in the early 15th century as that of a rowdy port town, whose men practised fighting on water and whose everyday affairs were arranged by women. Around this time, cities on the peninsula regularly complained to the Chinese court about constant Siamese attacks.

=== Age of warfare ===
The 1430s–1600 marked a period of rising warfare throughout Mainland Southeast Asia. In 1500, the Portuguese noted that Ayutthaya had 100 elephants; 50 years later, it reportedly had 50,000. Ayutthaya began launching military expeditions far to the west and east. In the west, it fought to acquire Tavoy, Mergui, Tenasserim, and Martaban in the late 15th century. Song China's growing interest in maritime commerce at the turn of the second millennium made trade between China and the Indian Ocean increasingly lucrative. In the 1430s, Ayutthaya attacked Angkor but did not sack the city, although it installed a short-lived puppet ruler.

Palace Law Codes under Borommatrailokkanat reflected a growing emphasis on warfare, specifying rewards based on the number of enemies beheaded. The introduction of elephants, guns, and mercenaries made warfare in Southeast Asia more frequent and deadly. By the late 16th century, Pegu (Bago) suffered a severe conscript revolt, while Ayutthaya's phrai fled into the forests or bribed conscription officers. The construction of stronger city walls also neutralized the offensive advantages of massive armies, transforming field battles into protracted sieges.

==== Transition to a hinterland state ====
The Ayutthaya Kingdom shifted from a maritime to a more hinterland-oriented state during the 15th and 16th centuries. Its absorption of the Northern Cities and the shift of trade toward inland routes with China facilitated this change. The reign of King Borommatrailokkanat marked the peak of this merger between the basin and the Northern Cities, following generations of intermarriage between their ruling families.

Although Borommatrailokkanat symbolized the merger of North and South, Lan Na, north of Ayutthaya in modern Northern Thailand, contested Ayutthaya's growing influence over the Northern Cities. The Ayutthaya-Lan Na War was fought over the Upper Chao Phraya valley for control of the Northern Cities. Whether because he favoured the Northern Cities or needed a capital closer to the war, Borommatrailokkanat moved his capital to Phitsanulok. Lan Na suffered setbacks, and Borommatrailokkanat eventually sued for peace in 1475.

Ayutthaya's sphere of influence down the peninsula was contested by the Malacca Sultanate. Ayutthaya launched several unsuccessful conquests against Malacca, which was strengthened diplomatically and economically by military support from Ming China. In the early 15th century, the Ming admiral Zheng He established a base in the port city, making it a strategic position China could not afford to lose to the Siamese. Under this protection, Malacca flourished, becoming one of Ayutthaya's chief foes until the Portuguese capture of Malacca. Ayutthaya's focus on portage routes across the upper peninsula meant it sent no military expedition to the lower peninsula or Malay states throughout the 16th century.

==== Centralization and dominance of the Northern lords ====
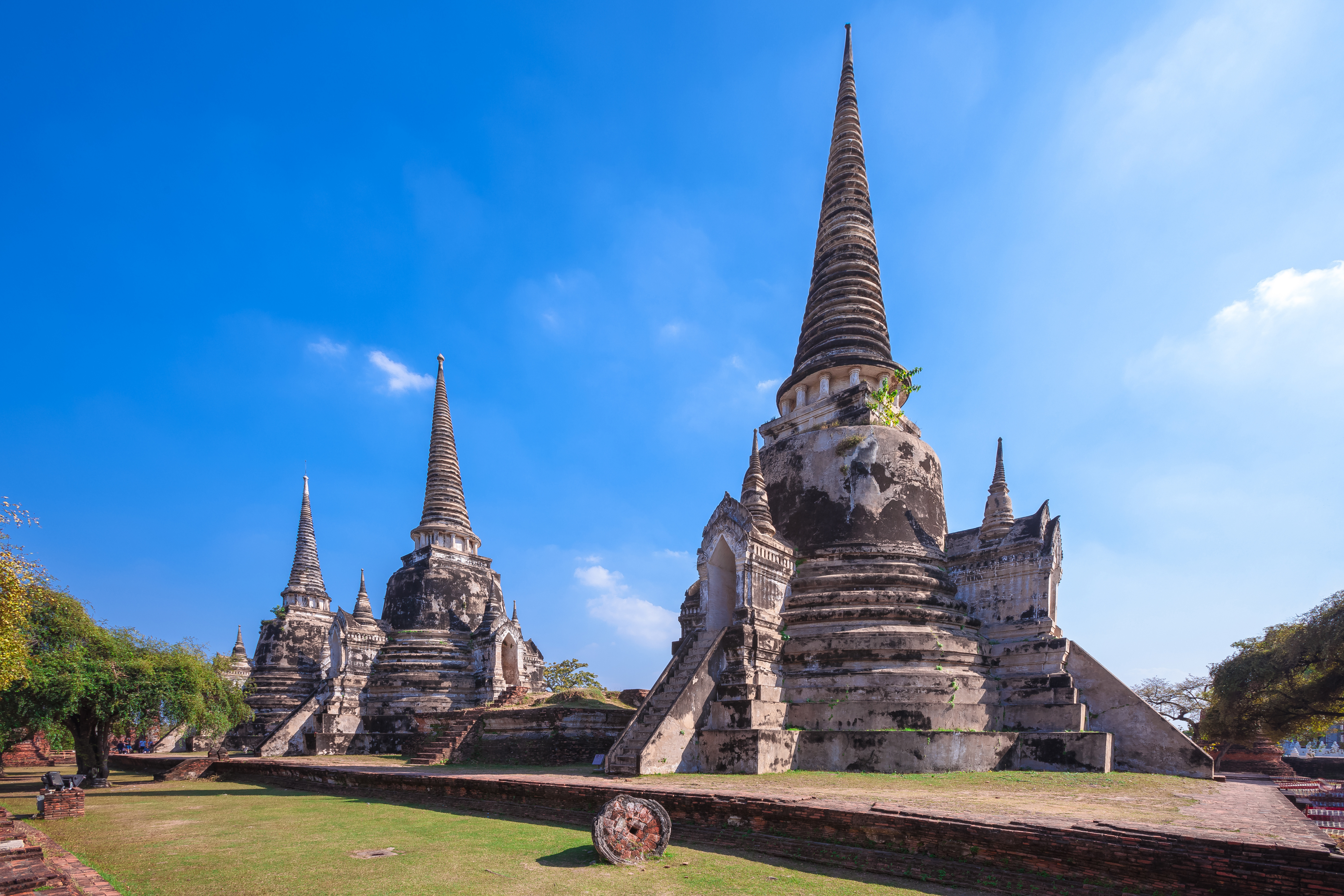
Three pagodas of Wat Phra Si Sanphet which house the remains of King Borommatrailokkanat, Borommarachathirat III, and Ramathibodi II

Ayutthaya's sphere of influence stretched from the Northern Cities to the Malay Peninsula, with its heartland centered on the old Ayutthaya-Suphanburi-Lopburi-Phetchaburi polity. The Muang Look Luang system was inadequate for governing such a vast territory. King Borommatrailokkanat centralized and institutionalized government through the Palatine Law of 1455, which served as Ayutthaya's constitution for the rest of its existence and, in altered forms, as Siam's until 1892. The central government was dominated by the Chatusadom system (จตุสดมภ์, lit. "Four Pillars"), in which two Prime Ministers led the court: the Samuha Nayok, the Civil Prime Minister, and the Samuha Kalahom, the Grand Commander of Forces, overseeing civil and military affairs respectively. The Samuha Nayok oversaw the Four Ministries. In the regions, the king appointed governors rather than "rulers" to govern cities. Cities were organized into four levels, with large cities exercising authority over secondary and lower-level cities. An inspector, the yokkrabat, was posted in each city and could take a complaint past the governor to the king.

Ayutthaya's growing wealth led to chronic succession struggles for the throne. In the absence of a stable succession law, princely governors and powerful dignitaries claiming royal merit gathered forces and marched on the capital to press their claims, resulting in several bloody coups from the 16th century onward. On Yoneo Ishii's reading of the Three Seals Law, Phitsanulok and Nakhon Si Thammarat ranked first and six towns second, among them Sawankhalok, Sukhothai and Kamphaeng Phet. As the Suphanburi clan consolidated its dominance, it faced increasingly powerful nobles from the Northern Cities, who came south seeking wealth and influence. The first major succession struggles emerged in the early 16th century, with Northern lords playing a prominent role. Under Maha Chakkraphat, the Lord of Phitsanulok, Maha Thammarachathirat, emerged as a kingmaker. The transition culminated in the overthrow of the Suphanburi clan following the 1569 Burmese capture of Ayutthaya, which placed Maha Thammarachathirat on the throne.

The 15th century marked a turning point in Ayutthaya's self-image. King Borommatrailokkanat performed a coronation ceremony, apparently the first in Ayutthaya, in the 1460s. Before the 15th century, Ayutthaya's palaces and temples were less grand than those of cities such as Sukhothai and Phitsanulok. By the early 16th century, Ayutthaya rivalled its regional competitors in grandeur, building magnificent wats and palaces for its kings and numerous tributary states.

==== First Burmese wars ====
King Tabinshwehti of Pegu's invasion of Ayutthaya in 1547–1549

Starting in the mid-16th century, the kingdom came under repeated attacks by the Taungoo dynasty of Burma. The Burmese–Siamese War (1547–1549) ended with a failed Burmese siege of Ayutthaya. A second siege (1563–1564) led by King Bayinnaung forced King Maha Chakkraphat to surrender in 1564. The royal family was taken to Pegu (Bago), while his second son Mahinthrathirat was installed as vassal king. In 1568, Mahinthrathirat revolted when his father returned from Pegu as a Buddhist monk. The ensuing third siege captured Ayutthaya in 1569, and Bayinnaung made Maha Thammarachathirat (also known as Sanphet I) his vassal king, establishing the Sukhothai dynasty. The chronicles leave the captured city with 10,000 inhabitants and 100 officials.

In May 1584, less than three years after Bayinnaung's death, Uparaja Naresuan (or Sanphet II), son of Sanphet I, proclaimed Ayutthaya's independence. Burma repeatedly invaded Ayutthaya, but the Siamese repelled the attacks. The war ended in an elephant duel at the fourth siege of Ayutthaya in 1593, in which King Naresuan killed the Burmese heir-apparent Mingyi Swa, though scholars such as Sulak Sivaraksa have questioned whether it took place. Today, this Siamese victory is observed annually on 18 January as Royal Thai Armed Forces Day. Later that year, warfare resumed (Burmese–Siamese War (1593–1600)) when the Siamese invaded Burma, first occupying Tanintharyi province in southeast Burma in 1593 and later Moulmein and Martaban in 1594. In 1599, the Siamese attacked Pegu but were ultimately driven out by Burmese rebels who had assassinated King Nanda Bayin and taken power.

In 1613, after King Anaukpetlun reunited Burma, the Burmese invaded Siamese-held Tanintharyi province and took Tavoy. In 1614, they invaded Lan Na, then a vassal of Ayutthaya. Fighting continued until a treaty ended the conflict in 1618. Burma gained control of Lan Na, while Ayutthaya retained southern Tanintharyi, south of Tavoy.

=== Peace and commerce ===
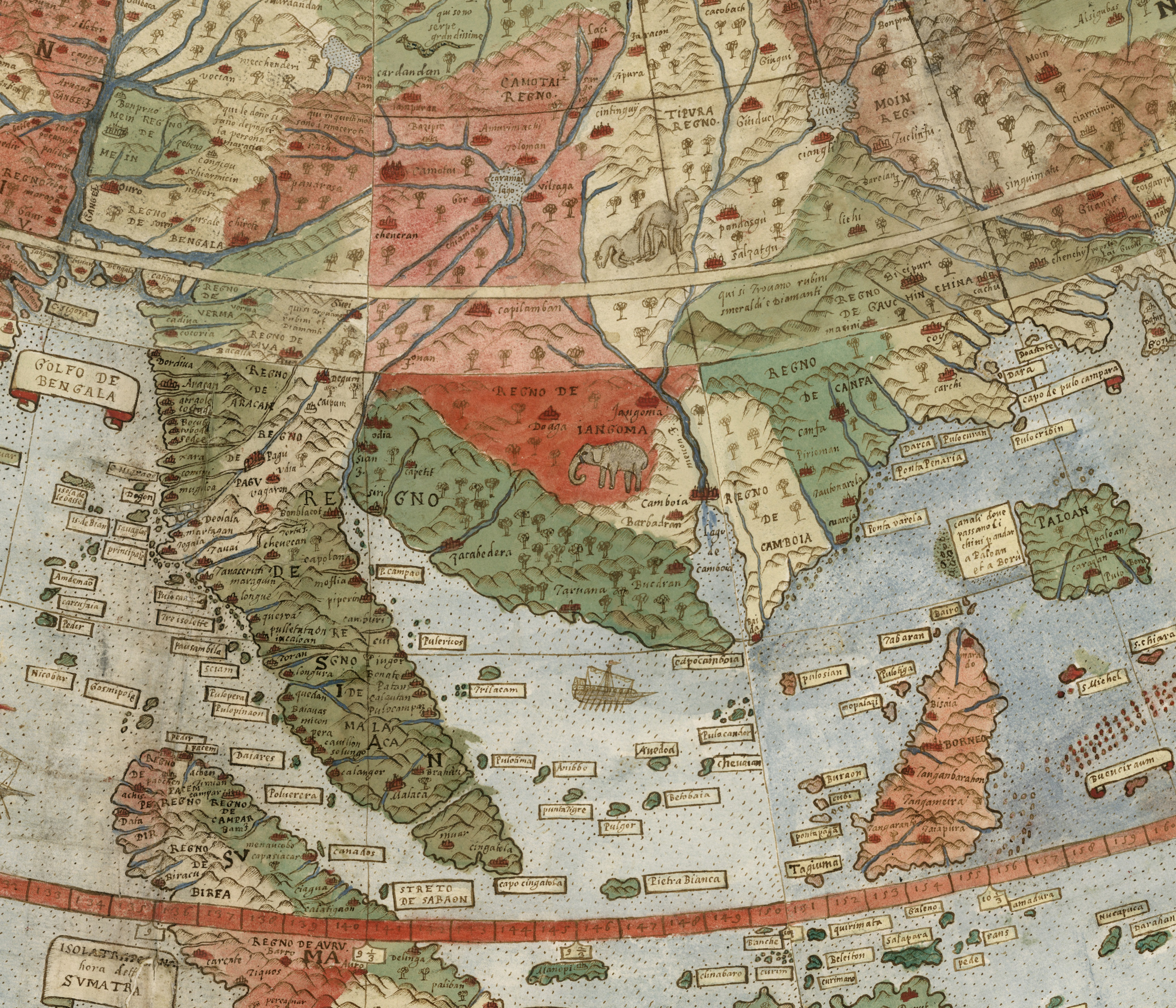
Urbano Monti's 1587 map. Regno de Sian (Siam) included the Malay Peninsula and the east coast of the Gulf of Siam. North Sumatra had tributary states of Siam.

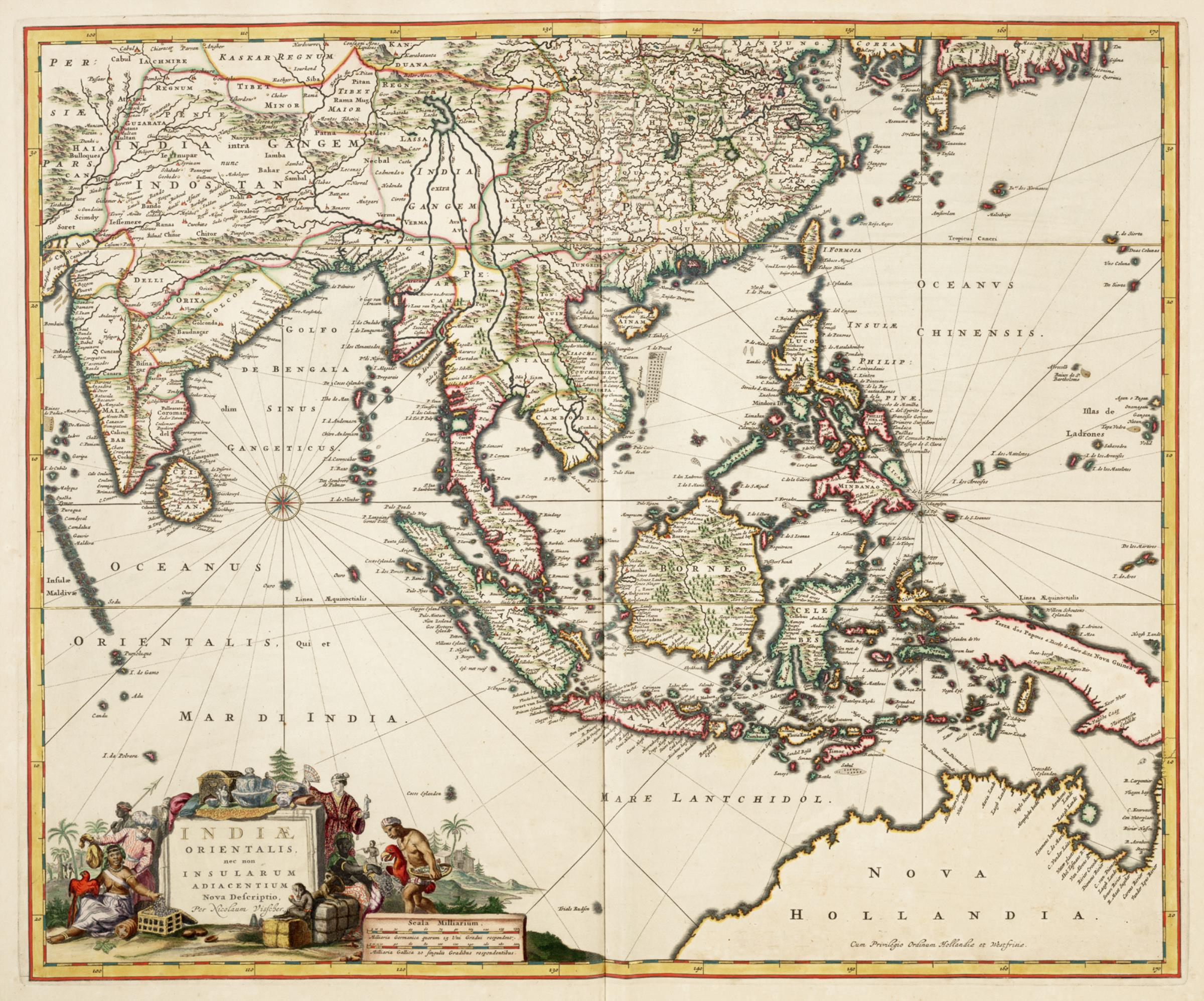
Nicolaas Visscher II's map of Southeast Asia, published in 1649–1702. It shows the trading region of the Dutch East India Company (VOC).

The cessation of warfare around 1600 gave way to a prolonged period of peace and commerce under Ekathotsorot. The Portuguese and Dutch conquest of Malacca encouraged Asian traders to bypass it via the mid-peninsula portage routes controlled by Ayutthaya. This was an era of great Asian empires: the Ottoman Empire, Safavid Empire, Mughal Empire, Ming and Qing China, and Tokugawa Japan. Ayutthaya became a lucrative intermediary between the global empires of the Early Modern World. With warfare subsiding, kings and nobles turned to hunting, trade, and competition for the throne.

The period also saw the emergence of mercantile absolutism. A virtual monopoly over the kingdom's income allowed the king to build temples and palaces, sponsor ceremonies, and surround the monarchy with ritual mysticism. The king could appoint city governors and ministers, making the throne more lucrative than before. Successfully placing a candidate on the throne could greatly reward those who facilitated his accession. The ability to appoint a Front Palace was effective in wartime but became a double-edged sword during peace. Foreigners, lacking connections within the kingdom, often rose to prominent positions at the Ayutthaya court.

==== Later Phitsanulok dynasty to early Prasat Thong dynasty ====
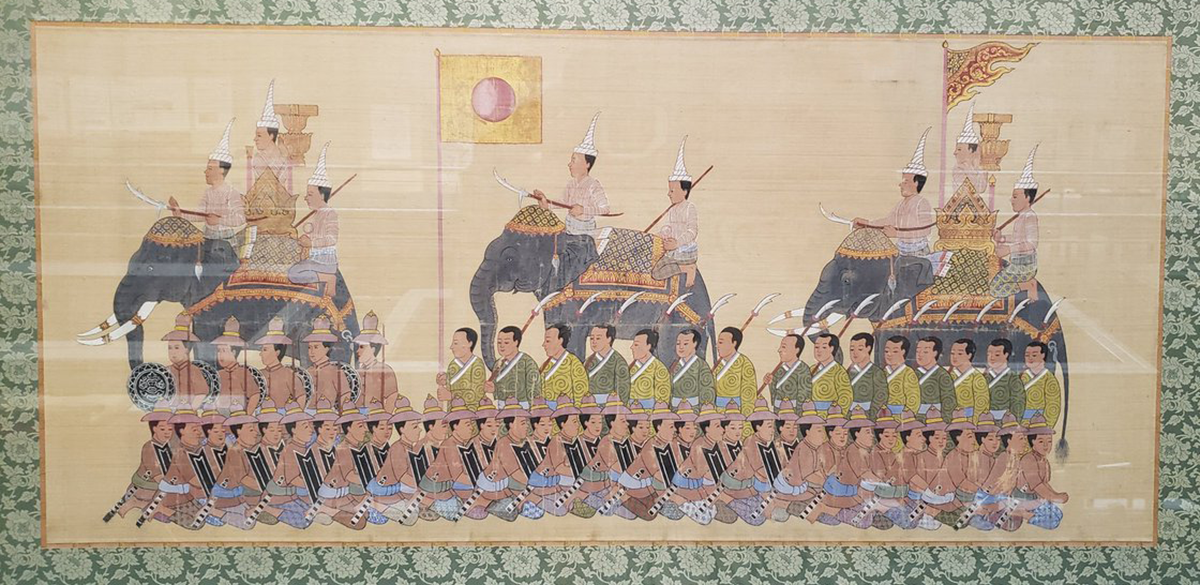
Yamada Nagamasa's Japanese mercenaries, a force in court intrigue in the first half of the 17th century

In 1605, Naresuan died of illness while on campaign against a Burmese spillover conflict in the Shan region, leaving a greatly expanded Siamese kingdom to be ruled by his younger brother, Ekathotsarot (Sanphet III). Ekathotsarot's reign was marked with stability for Siam and its sphere of influence, as well as increased foreign interactions, especially with the Dutch Republic, Portuguese Empire, and Tokugawa Shogunate (by way of the Red Seal Ships), among others. Indeed, representatives from many foreign lands began to fill Siam's civil and military administration – Japanese traders and mercenaries led by Yamada Nagamasa, for example, had considerable influence with the king.

Ekathotsarot's era ended with his death in 1610/11. The question of his succession was complicated by the alleged suicide of his eldest legitimate son, Suthat, while his second legitimate son, Si Saowaphak, was never legally designated as an heir by Ekathotsarot himself. Nonetheless, Si Saowaphak succeeded to the throne against his late father's wishes, and led a short and ineffective reign in which he was kidnapped and held hostage by Japanese merchants, and later murdered. After this episode, the kingdom was handed to Songtham, a lesser son born of Ekathotsarot and a first-class concubine.

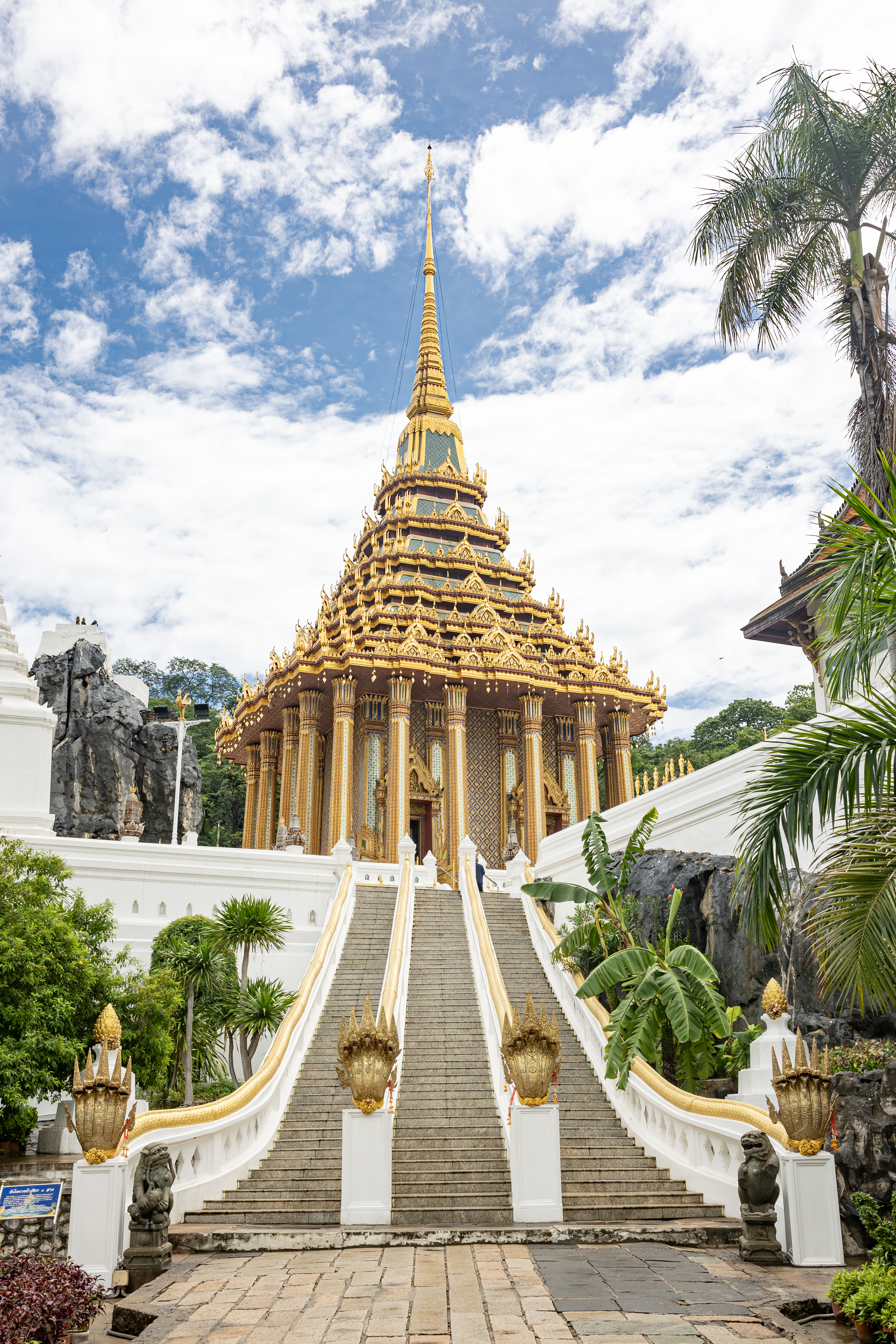
Wat Phra Phutthabat, Saraburi, constructed by King Songtham as a royal pilgrimage site

Songtham temporarily restored stability to Ayutthaya and focused on religious construction, most notably a great temple at Wat Phra Phutthabat. Abroad, he lost suzerainty over Lan Na, Cambodia, and Tavoy, expelled the Portuguese, and opened trade with the English East India Company and the French East India Company, alongside new merchant colonies from across Asia. Songtham also retained Yamada Nagamasa, whose Japanese mercenaries served as the king's royal guard.

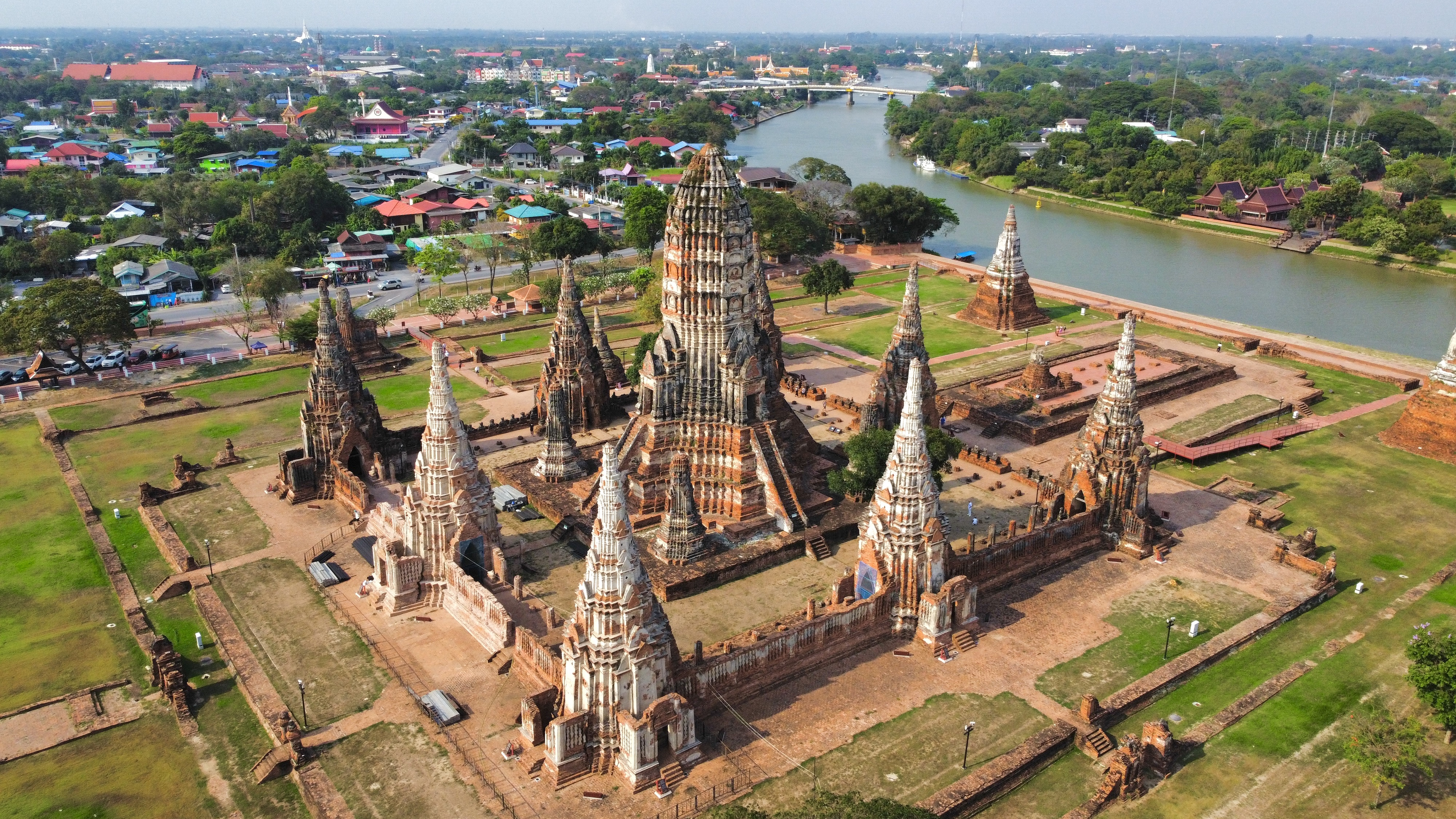
Wat Chaiwatthanaram, constructed by King Prasat Thong during the Age of Peace and Commerce (1600–1688)

As Songtham's life began to fade, succession again generated conflict when both his brother, Prince Sisin, and his son, Prince Chetthathirat, found support at court. Although Thai tradition typically favored brothers over sons in matters of inheritance, Songtham enlisted his influential cousin, Prasat Thong, to ensure his son would inherit the kingdom. When Songtham died in 1628, Prasat Thong used his alliance with Yamada Nagamasa's mercenaries to purge Sisin's supporters, eventually capturing and executing Sisin. Prasat Thong soon overshadowed the newly crowned Chetthathirat and staged a coup that deposed and executed him in favour of his younger brother Athittayawong, whom he intended to use as a puppet.

This arrangement quickly met resistance from elements of the Thai court dissatisfied with having two acting heads of state. Since Prasat Thong already ruled Siam in all but name as Kalahom, he orchestrated the final dethronement and execution of the child king in 1629. Prasat Thong had thus fully usurped the throne through double, perhaps triple, regicide, ending the Sukhothai dynasty 60 years after its installation by the Burmese. Many of his former allies abandoned him after his accession. In quelling the resistance, Prasat Thong assassinated his former ally Yamada Nagamasa in 1630, who had opposed the coup, and banished the remaining Japanese from Siam. Although a community of Japanese exiles was eventually welcomed back, the episode marked the end of the Tokugawa Shogunate's long-standing formal relationship with the Ayutthaya Kingdom.

==== Persian and French influences ====
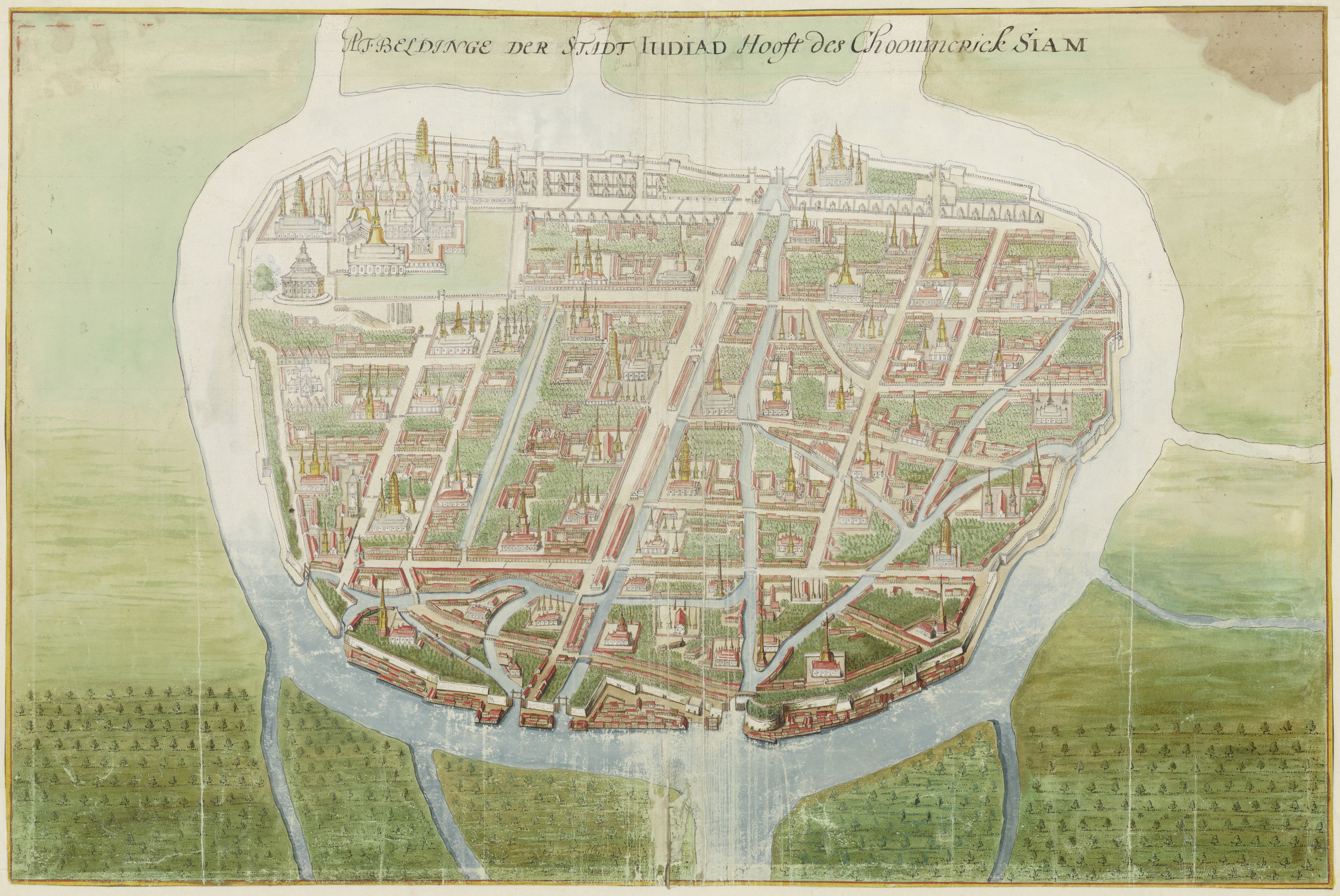
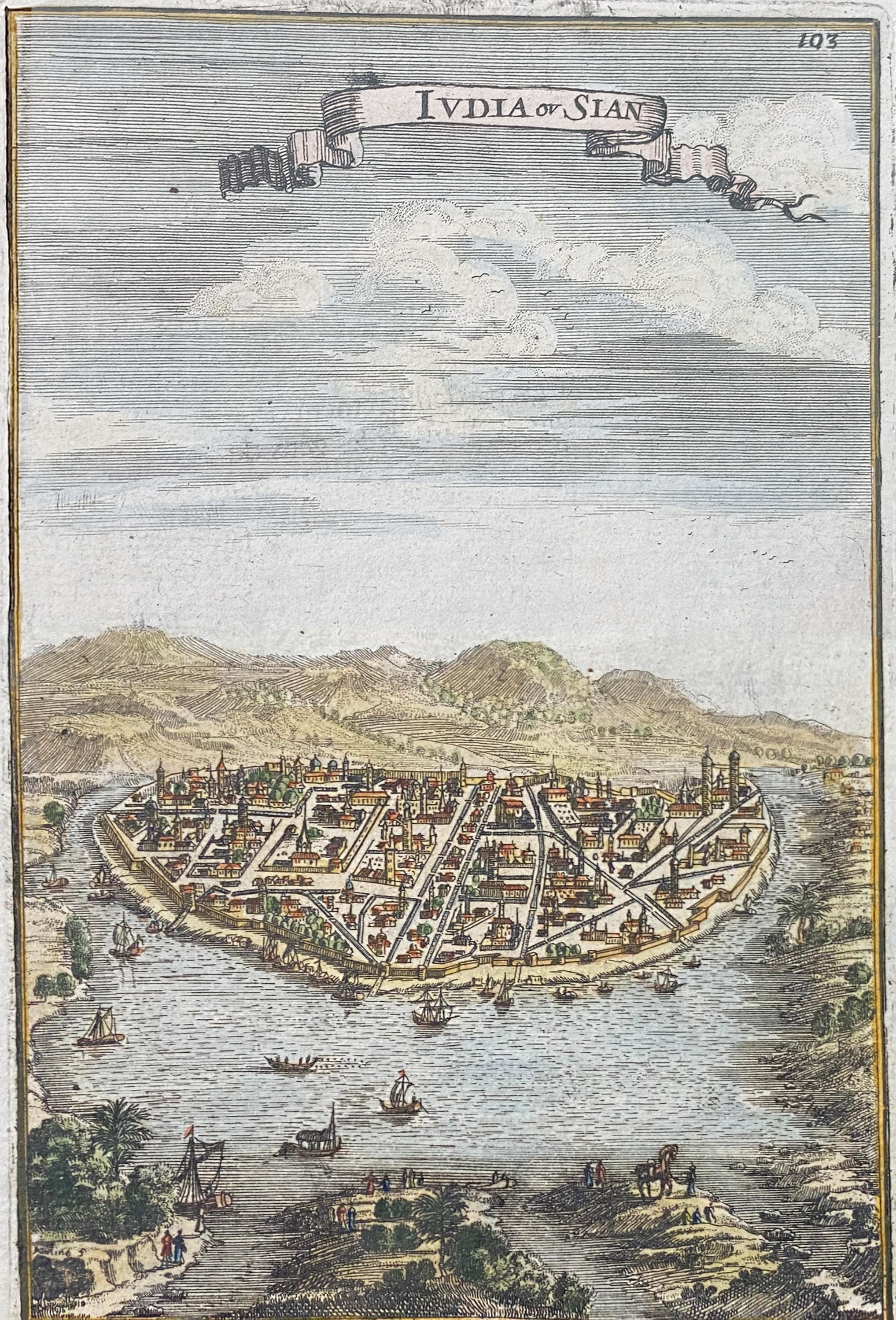
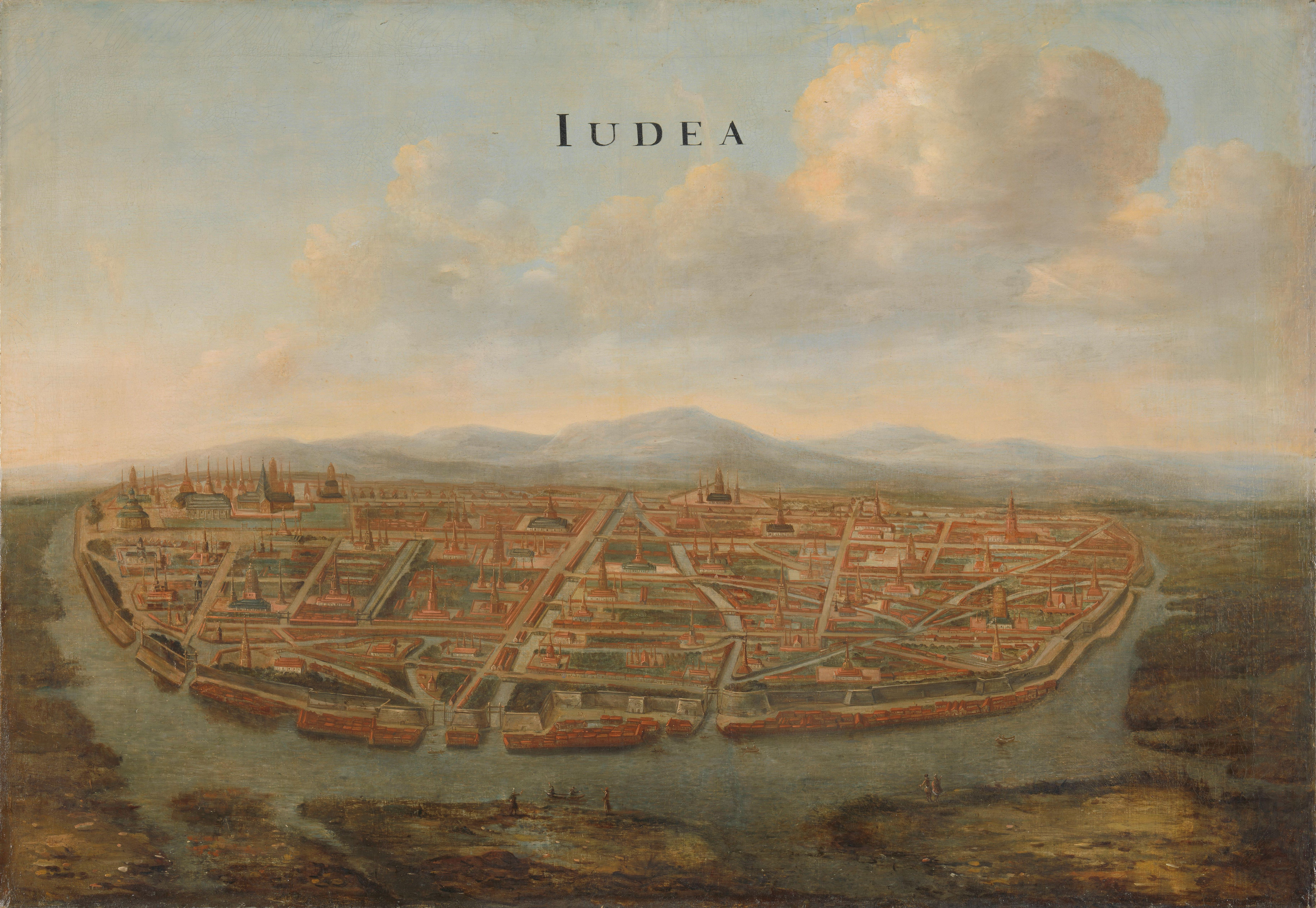
Clockwise: 1. Painting by Johannes Vingboons of Ayutthaya, c. 1665. 2. View of Ayutthaya City, by Alain Mallet 1683. 3. Painting of Ayutthaya c. 1665, painted by Johannes Vingboons, ordered by the Dutch East India Company.

Upon his death in 1656, King Prasat Thong was succeeded by his eldest son, Chai, who was almost immediately deposed and executed by the late king's brother, Si Suthammaracha, who was in turn defeated in single combat by his nephew, Narai. Narai secured the throne with the support of a mainly foreign court faction comprising groups marginalized under his father, including Persian, Dutch, and Japanese mercenaries. Ayutthaya consequently entered an era of greater openness to foreign trade, which brought luxury goods as well as new arms and weapons. In the mid-17th century, during Narai's reign, Ayutthaya became very prosperous.

In 1662, war between Burma and Ayutthaya erupted again when Narai sought to exploit unrest in Burma to seize Lan Na. Fighting along the border continued for two years, during which Narai seized Tavoy and Martaban. Ultimately, the Siamese ran out of supplies and withdrew behind their borders.

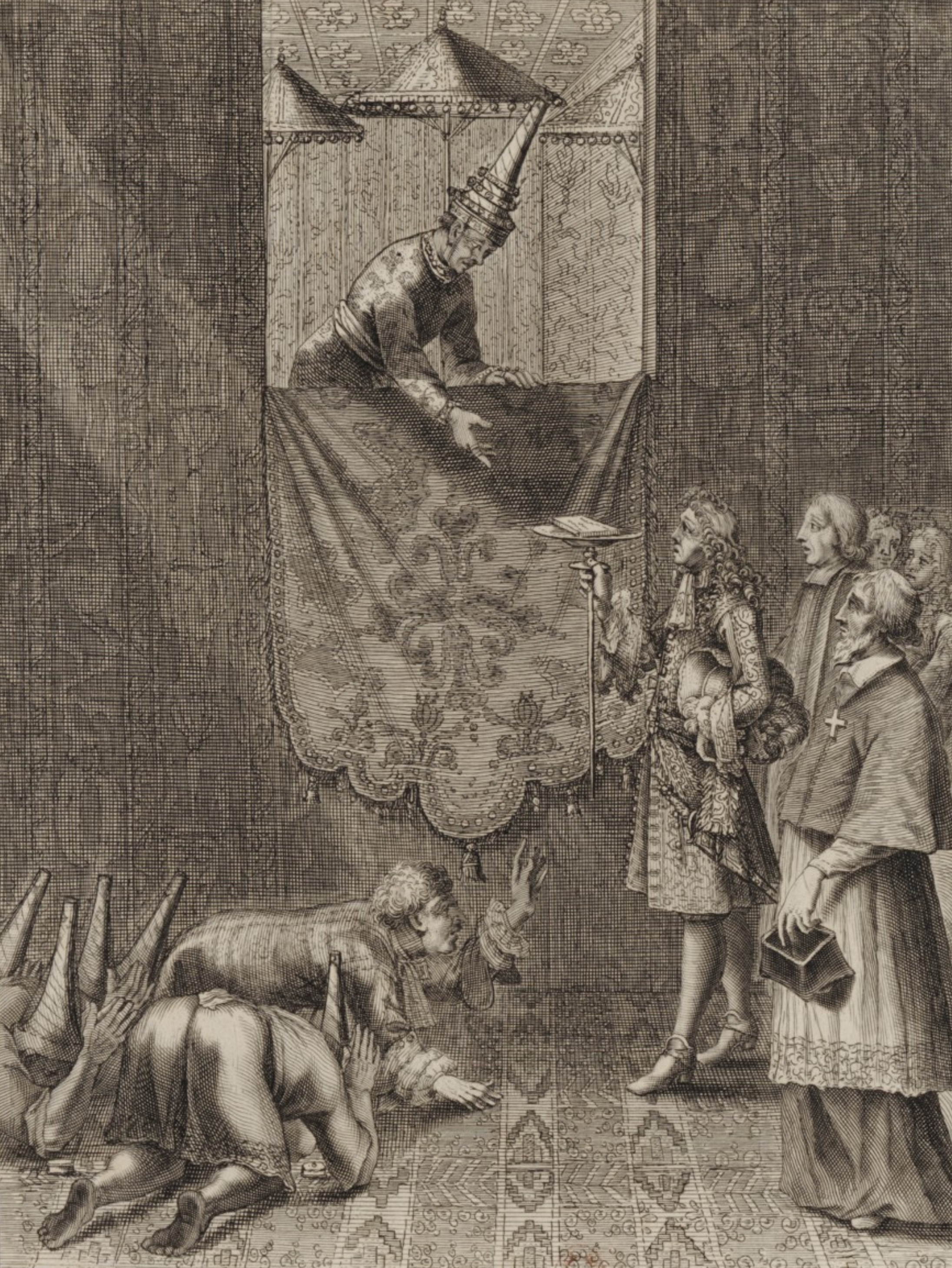
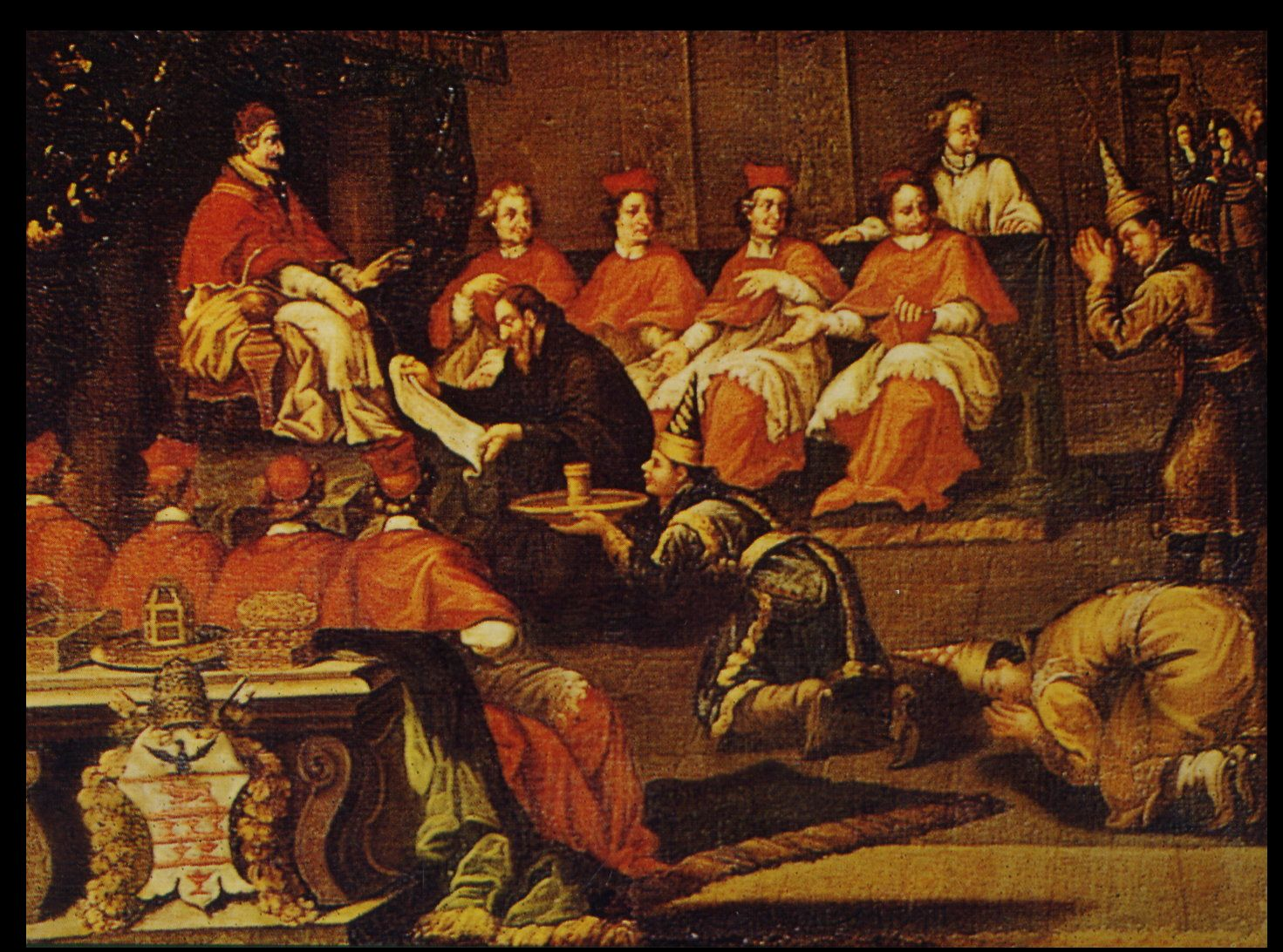
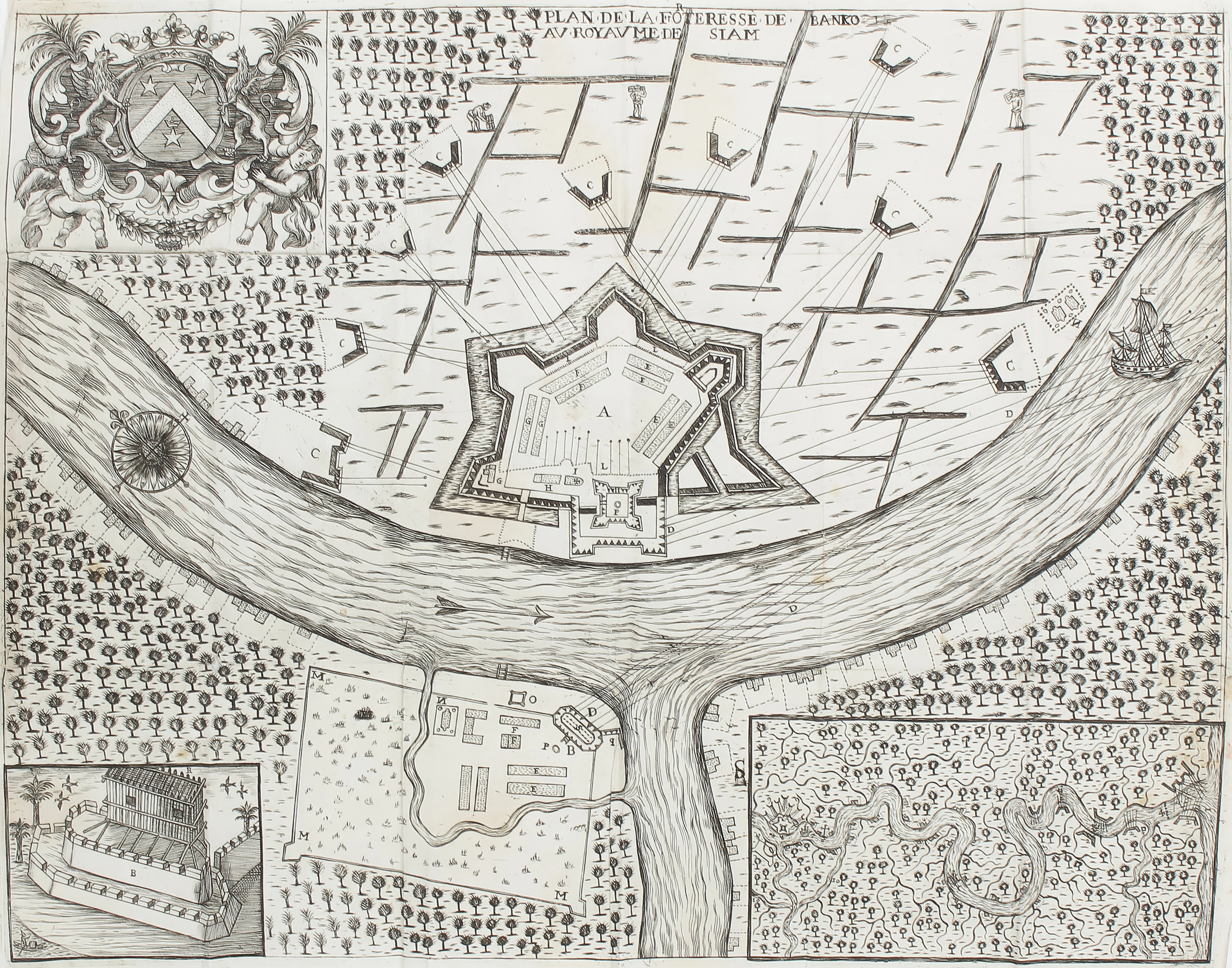
Clockwise: 1.The French ambassador Chevalier de Chaumont presents a letter from Louis XIV to King Narai. Constance Phaulkon is seen kowtowing in the lower left corner of the print. 2. The Siamese embassy, with Father Guy Tachard meeting with Pope Innocent XI, 23 December 1688. 3. The 1688 Siamese siege of the French fortress in Bangkok.

While commercially thriving, Narai's reign was also socially tumultuous. Much of this stemmed from competition among the Dutch, French, and English trading companies operating in Siam, whose role as a trade centre was fostered by Narai. Of these foreign powers, Narai favoured France, wary of growing Dutch and English colonial possessions in the South China Sea. He welcomed French Jesuits to his court and pursued closer relations with France and the Vatican. Narai also sent diplomatic missions to distant lands, among the most celebrated achievements of his reign. He leased the ports of Bangkok and Mergui to the French and incorporated French generals into his army to train it in Western strategy and oversee the construction of European-style forts. During this period, Narai abandoned the traditional capital of Ayutthaya for a Jesuit-designed palace in Lopburi.

As the Catholic presence grew and French forts were built and garrisoned on land leased to them, Siamese courtiers, Buddhist clergy, and other non-Catholic members of the court resented the favour shown to French interests. Their hostility was especially directed at Constantine Phaulkon, a Catholic Greek adventurer and advocate of French influence who rose to become Narai's prime minister and chief foreign-affairs adviser. Much of the turmoil was religious, as French Jesuits openly sought to convert Narai and the royal family to Catholicism.

Narai was courted not only by Catholic missionaries but also by proselytizing Muslim Persians, Chams, and Makassars, the latter of whom launched an unsuccessful revolt in 1686 to replace him with a Muslim puppet king. While the anti-foreign faction was primarily concerned with Catholic influence, evidence suggests that Narai was equally interested in Islam and had no desire to convert fully to either religion.

Nonetheless, a dissatisfied faction led by Narai's celebrated elephantry commander, Phetracha, had long planned a coup. When Narai fell seriously ill in May 1688, Phetracha and his accomplices arrested him, Phaulkon, and much of the royal family. All were executed except Narai, who died in captivity that July. With the king and his heirs removed, Phetracha usurped the throne and was crowned King of Ayutthaya on 1 August.

Phetracha soon took Mergui back from French control and began the pivotal Siege of Bangkok, which ended with a French retreat from Siam. His reign, however, was unstable. Many provincial governors refused to recognize his rule, while rebellions by Narai's supporters persisted for years. Phetracha's most important departure from Narai's policies was his refusal to continue foreign embassies. He instead reversed much of Narai's foreign policy and closed Thailand to almost all European interaction except with the Dutch.

=== Late Ayutthaya period ===
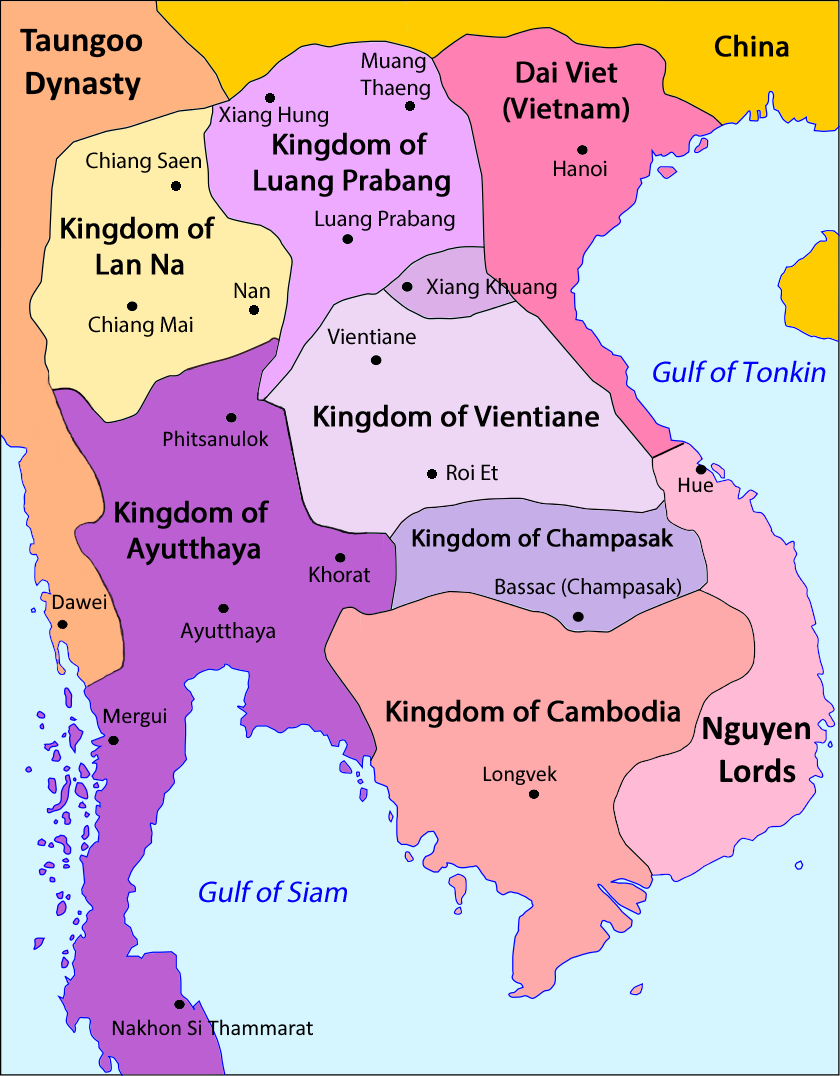
Ayutthaya and mainland Southeast Asia in 1707; political borders in the region remained undefined until modern times

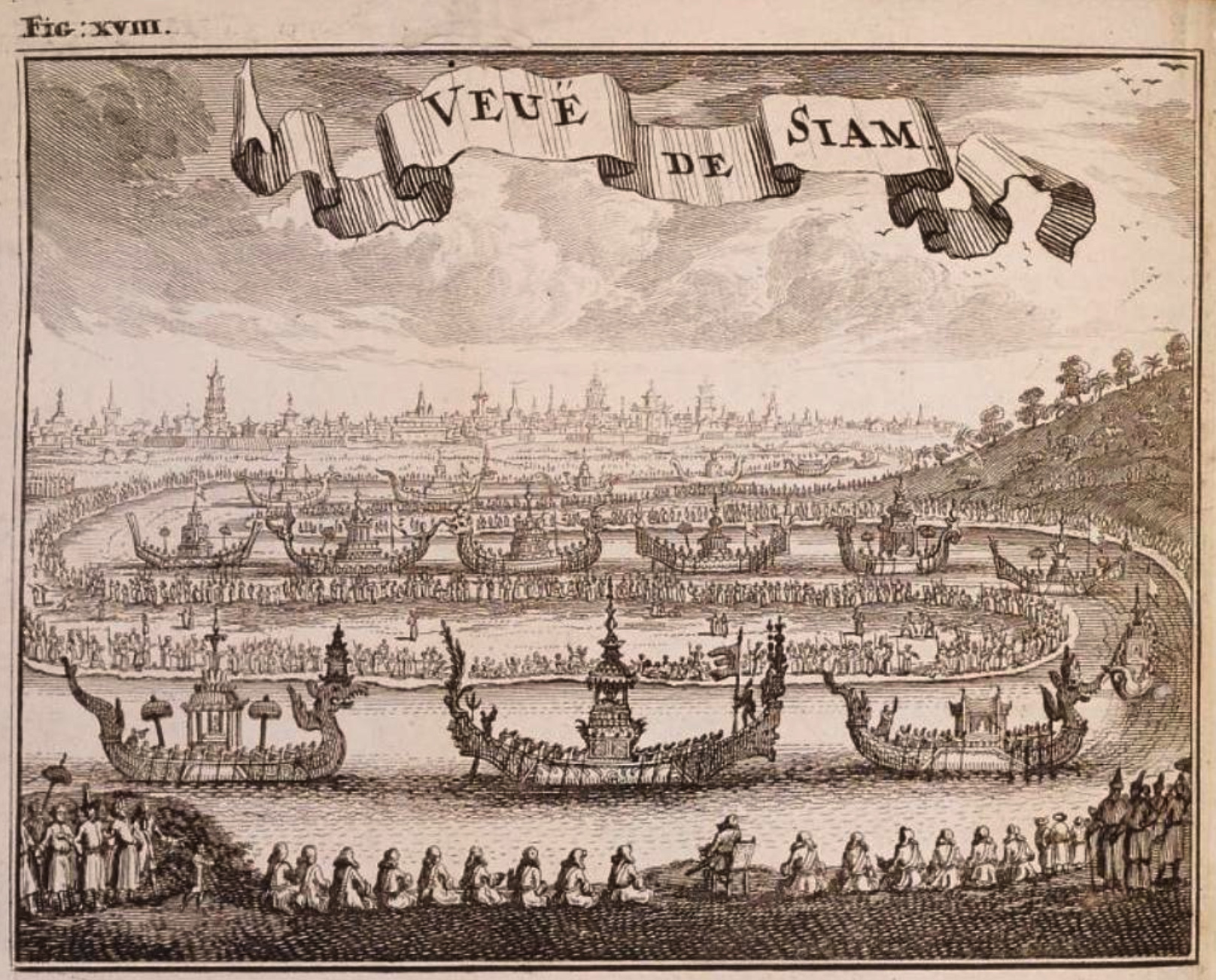
"Veuë de Siam" (View of Siam), engraving from Henri Abraham Chatelain's Atlas Historique (1719), depicting Ayutthaya

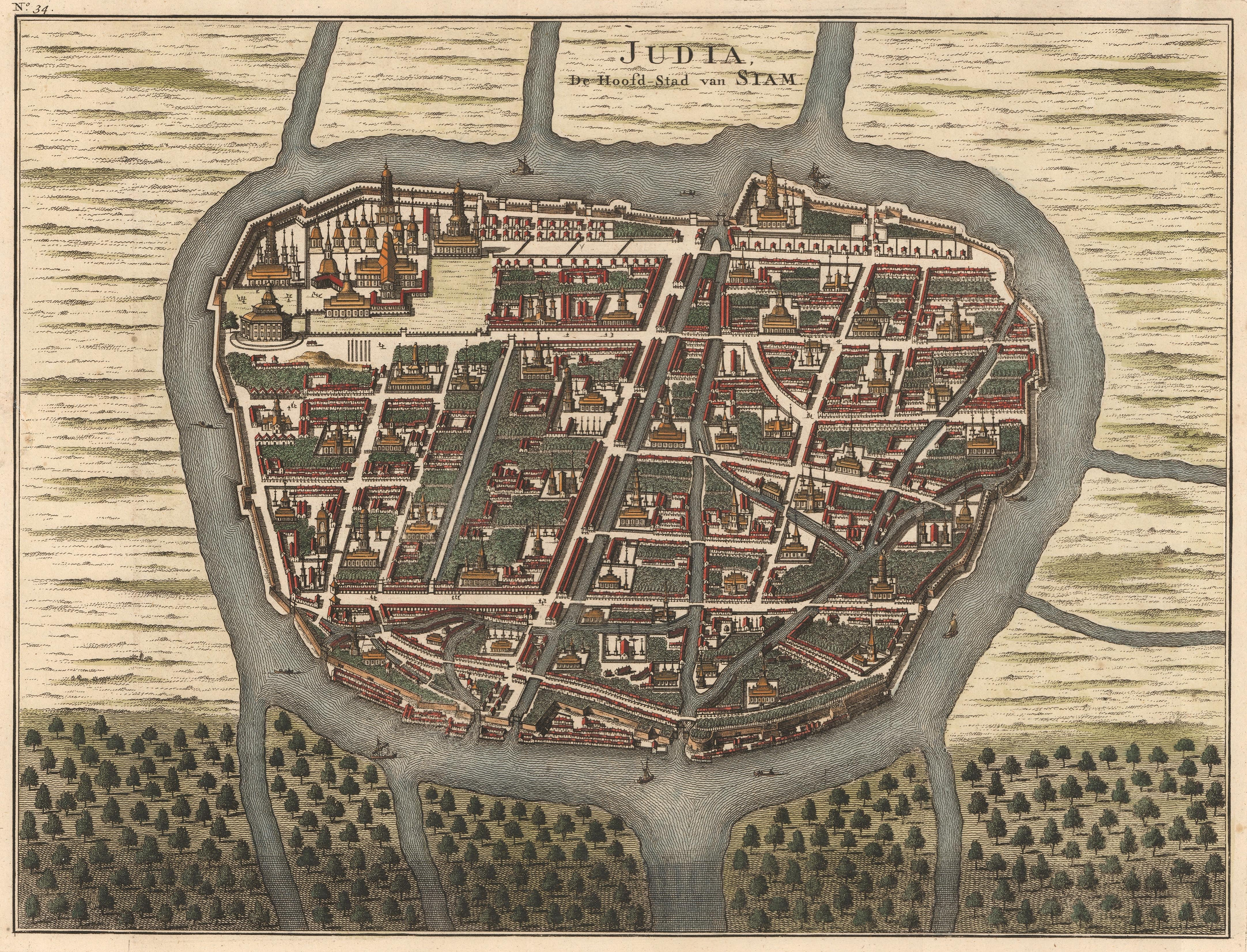
Map of Ayutthaya (Judia) during the golden age by Francois Valentijn 1726

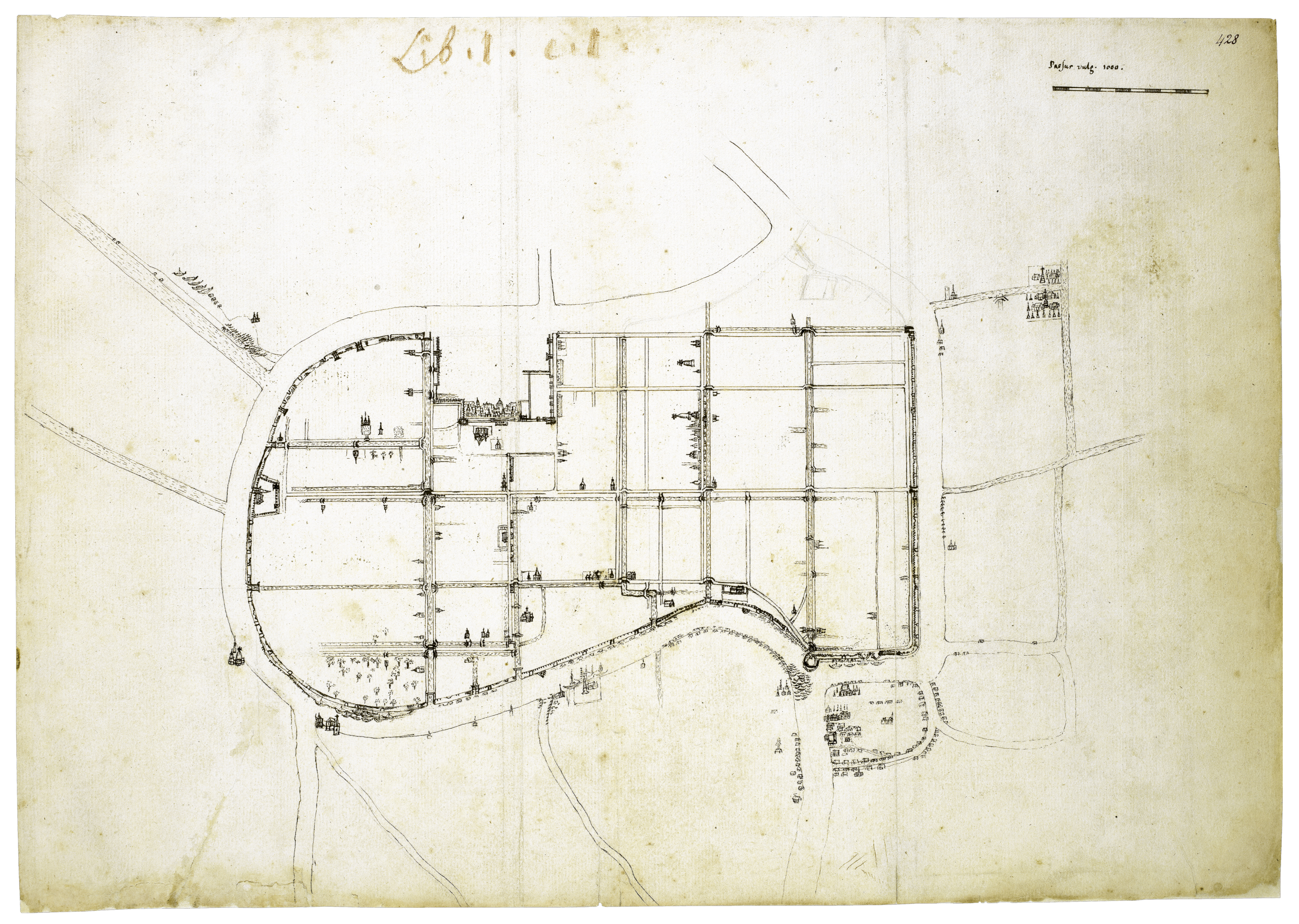
Ayutthaya City Plan Improved 1690

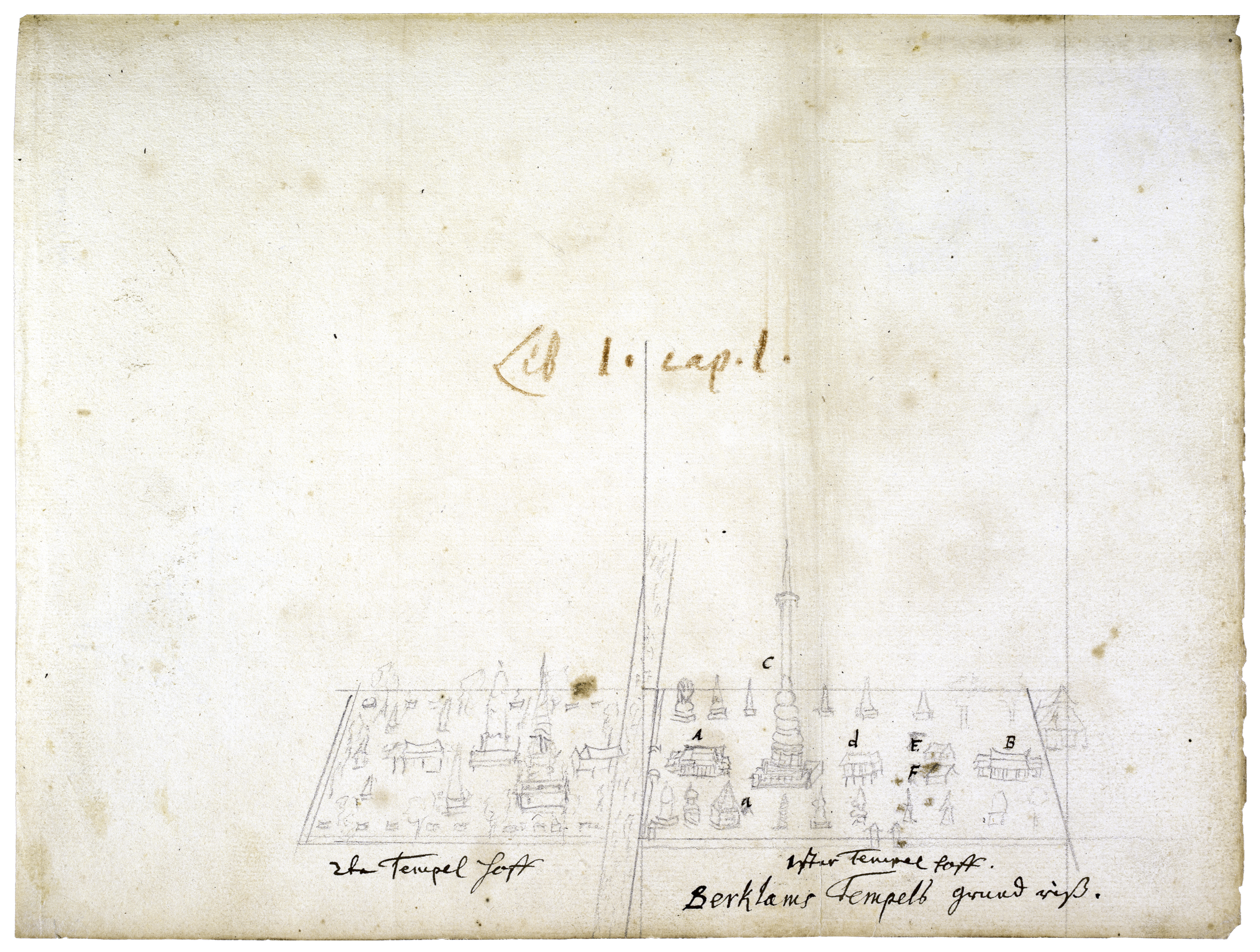
Plan of Phraklang's Temple at Ayutthaya 1690

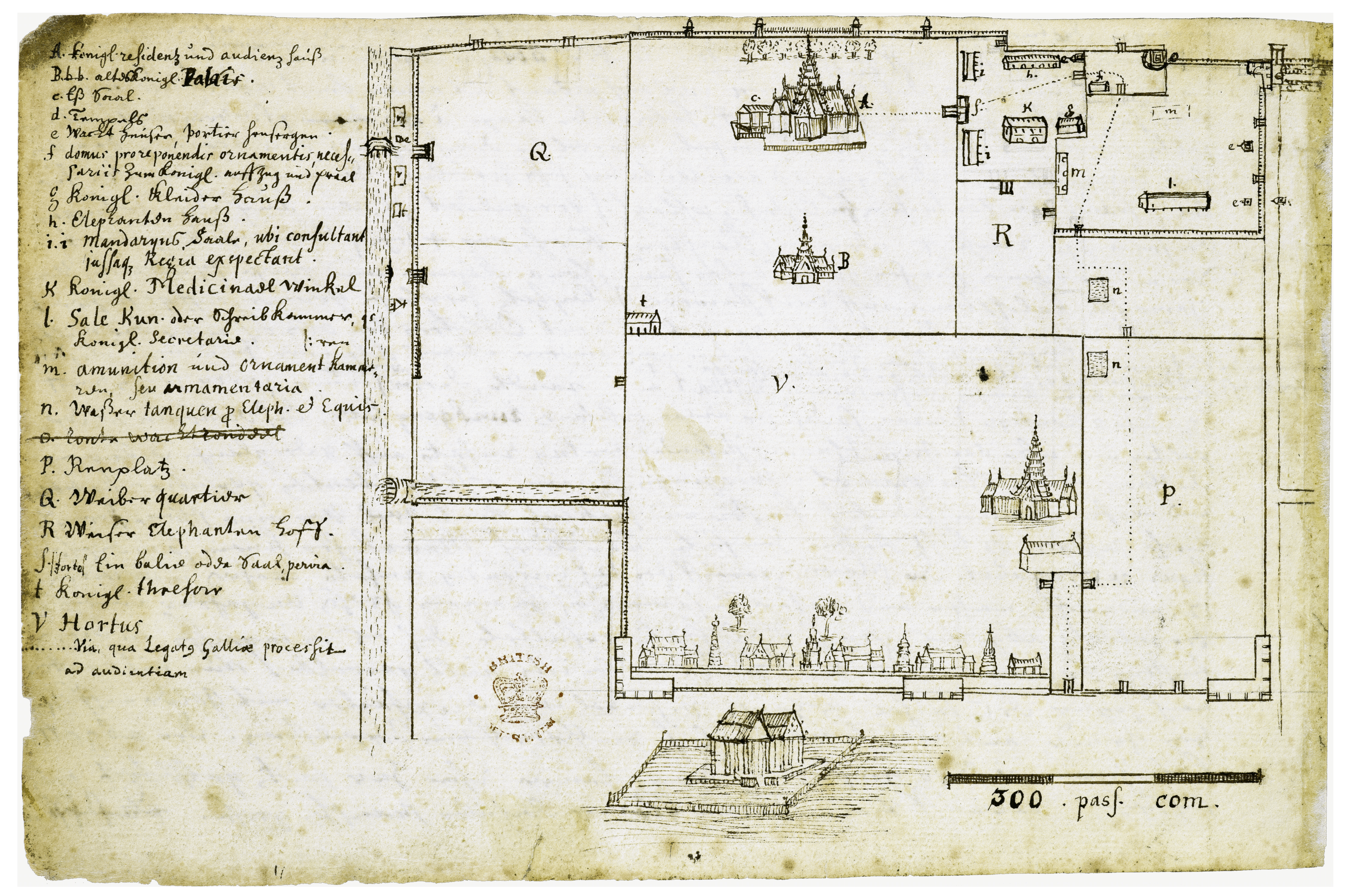
Plan of the Royal Palace at Ayutthaya 1690

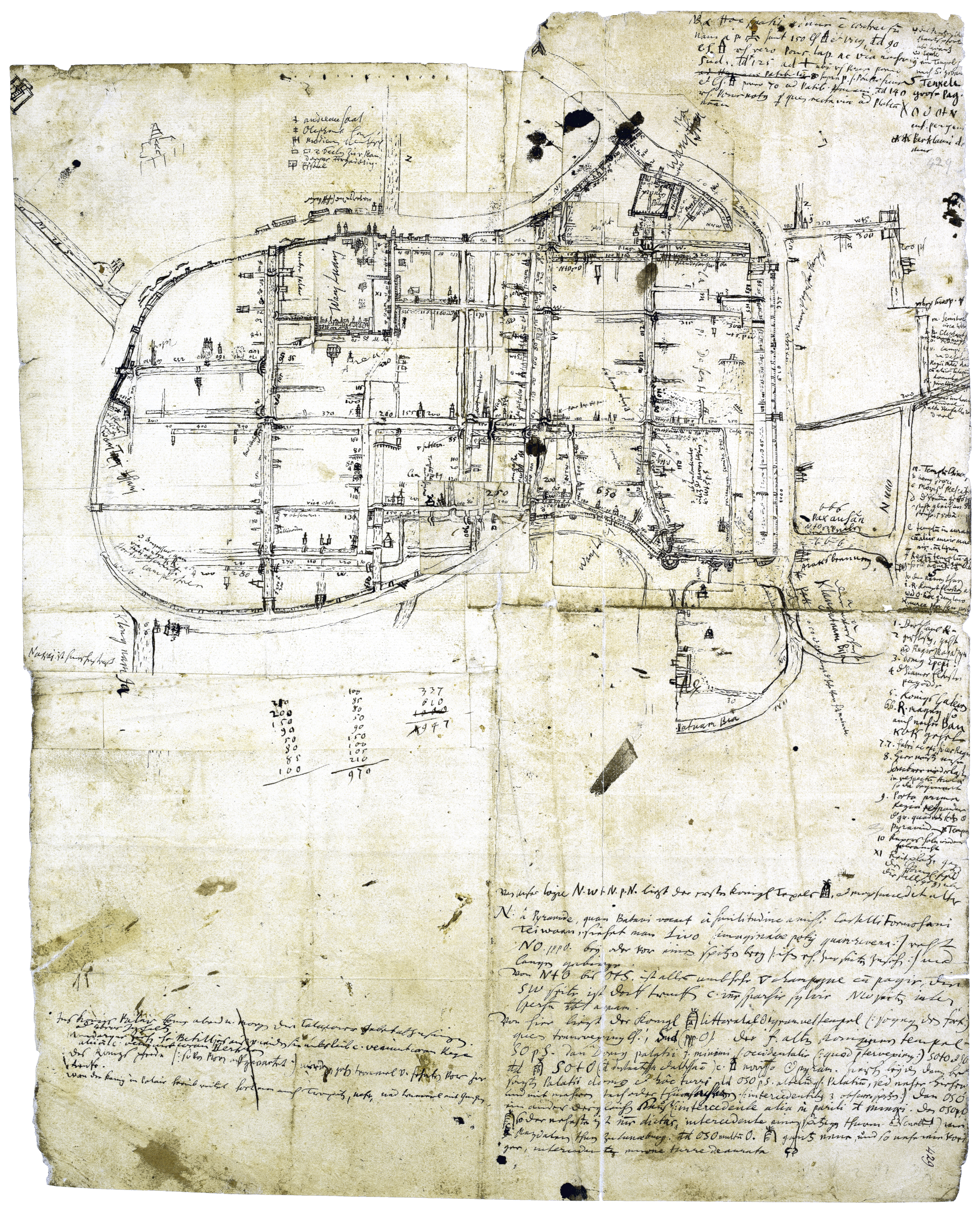
Ayutthaya City Plan Sketch 1690

German naturalist and explorer Engelbert Kaempfer visited Ayutthaya in June 1690 while en route to Japan. During his stay, he produced detailed maps, sketches, and observations regarding Siamese geography, government, and culture. His records were later published in 1906 in the three-volume work, The History of Japan, together with a Description of the Kingdom of Siam, 1690–92.

==== Continued prosperity and increased Chinese connections ====
Despite the departure of most Europeans from Ayutthaya, their economic presence was negligible compared with the city's China–Indian Ocean trade. Lieberman, later reinforced by Baker and Phongpaichit, rejected the view that Siam's supposed isolation from global trade after the French and English departure in 1688 led to Ayutthaya's gradual decline before its destruction by the Burmese in 1767, stating:

Clearly, however, the late 1600s and especially the early 1700s inaugurated a period not of sustained decline, but of Chinese-assisted economic vitality that would continue into the 19th century.

Instead, the 18th century was arguably the Ayutthaya Kingdom's most prosperous, particularly through trade with Qing China. China's population growth in the late 17th and 18th centuries, combined with rice shortages and famines in southern China, increased demand for rice imports from Ayutthaya and elsewhere. During the Late Ayutthaya Period (1688–1767), the Chinese population in Ayutthaya possibly tripled from 1680 to 1767, reaching 30,000. Chinese merchants drove the Ayutthaya economy during its final century and contributed to Siam's rapid recovery after the Burmese invasions of the 1760s. Both post-Ayutthaya monarchs, Taksin and Rama I, were connected by blood and political ties to the Sino-Siamese community.

==== Succession conflicts and corruption ====
Between 1600 and 1767, all but two royal successions were contested by mini civil wars in the capital. The throne became such a powerful and lucrative source of wealth during 150 years of prosperity that many royals sought to seize it. An 18th-century Ayutthaya noble lamented that many court officials and able generals had been killed in succession struggles over the previous 90 years. The last monarch, Ekkathat, and his brother Uthumphon undermined Prince Thammathibet, the Front Palace Uparaj and designated heir to their father, King Borommakot, by instigating or exposing his affair with two of his father's consorts. Prince Thammathibet was executed for his alleged crimes.

Corruption was rampant amid economic prosperity, with position buying and bribery for political offices becoming commonplace.

==== Introduction of capitalism, rise of commoners, and proto-nationalism ====
The mass arrival of Chinese farming settlers in 18th-century Siam contributed to the emergence of capitalist practices. The preceding 150 years of economic growth encouraged phrai to escape government control and become peasant farmers in the countryside, while others entered the monkhood or fled into the wilderness.

Late Ayutthaya records also introduced a new category of people, phrai mangmi, or rich "serfs".

From 1688 onwards, commoner revolts became increasingly severe. The mass revolt against French Catholicism that year was unprecedented in Ayutthaya history. The revolts also marked the emergence of proto-nationalism, as a proto-Siamese Buddhist identity began to form. Ayutthaya kings, however, only occasionally portrayed themselves as defenders of "the kingdom, people [sic], and Buddhism", a role that became more prominent under the Thonburi and Bangkok regimes following the traumatic destruction of the Siamese state in 1767.

==== Nobility and Buddhism ====
The 150 years of prosperity brought significant wealth to the Ayutthaya elite. They developed theatrical traditions, held elaborate celebrations and funerals, and received royal titles, privileges previously reserved for royalty.

Kings and nobles increasingly competed for control of a shrinking labour pool. Repeated Ayutthaya laws aimed at tightening labour controls reflected the elite's growing difficulty in controlling the population.

The turmoil accompanying increasing wealth led the Ayutthaya nobility to turn to Buddhist reform as a new source of social order. This was exemplified by King Borommakot (1733–1758), who was celebrated as a pious king embodying the virtues of a Bodhisattva. He built and restored temples and dramatically transformed the Ayutthaya skyline during his reign. In 1753, following a request from a delegation of Sri Lankan monks who had travelled to Ayutthaya, Borommakot sent two Siamese monks to reform Theravada Buddhism in Sri Lanka.

Only in the early Rattanakosin period did the surviving Ayutthaya nobility, under the future King Rama I, reform Buddhism in their own image and forge the enduring bond between the Siamese monarchy and Buddhism.

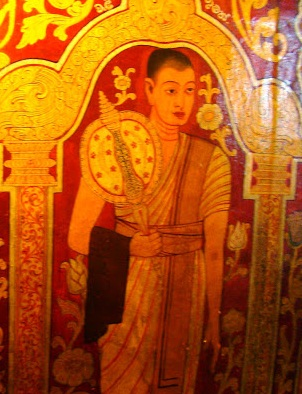
Weliwita Sri Saranankara Thero (1698–1778), the Sinhalese monk who led the revival of Buddhism in Sri Lanka and re-established the Upasampada there with help from the Mahasangha in Siam

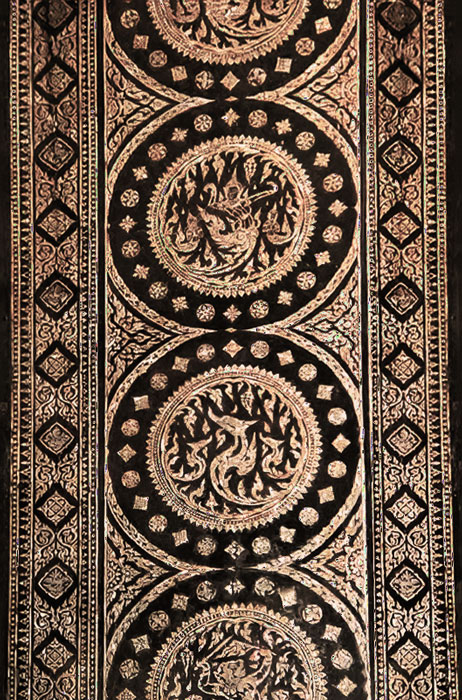
The mother-of-pearl doors of the Phra Phuttha Chinnarat vihara, Wat Phra Si Rattana Mahathat, Phitsanulok, made in 1756 under Borommakot and regarded as a masterpiece of late Ayutthaya art

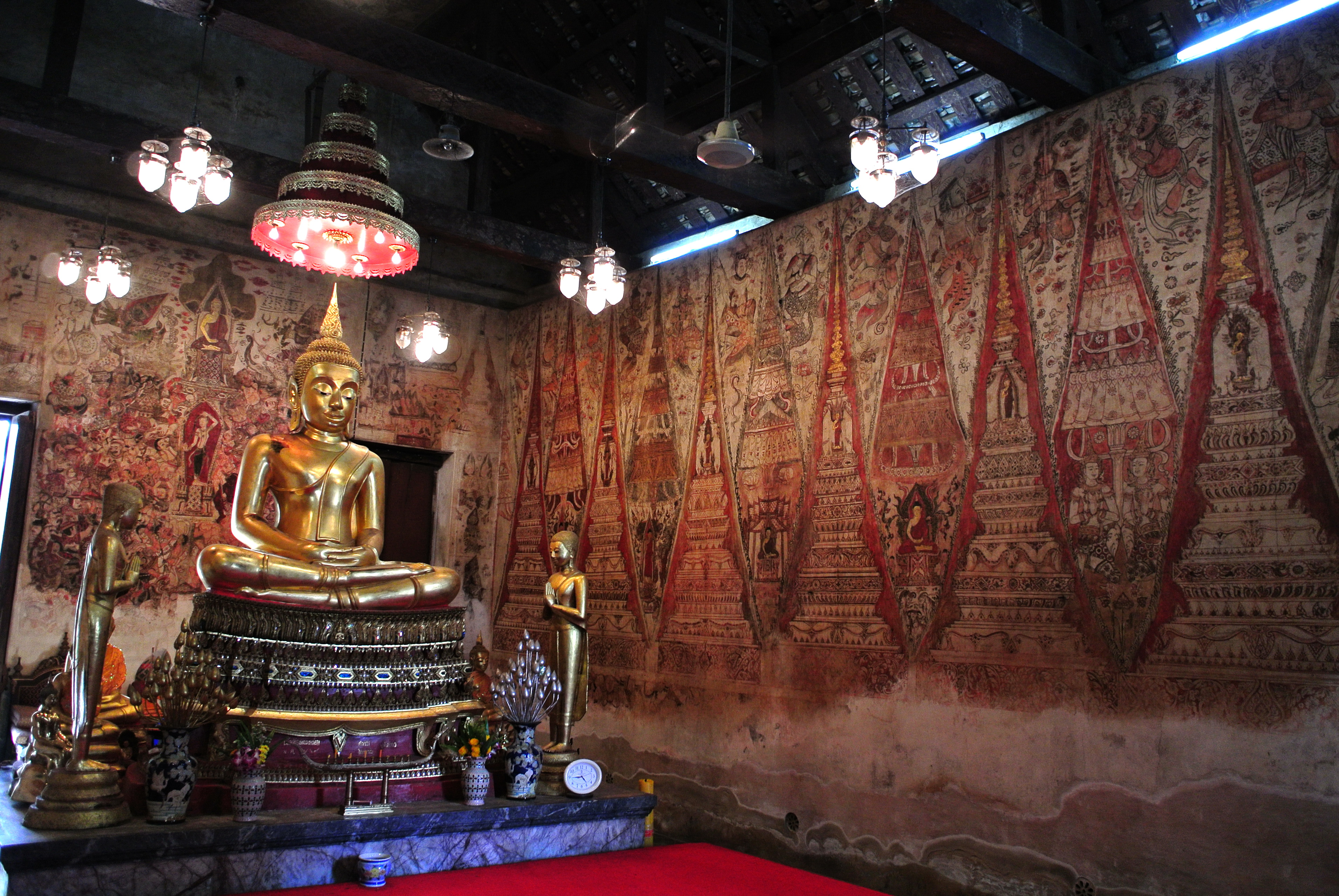
18th-century Ayutthaya temple murals in Wat Ko Kaew Suttharam, Phetchaburi, constructed by King Borommakot (r. 1733–1758)

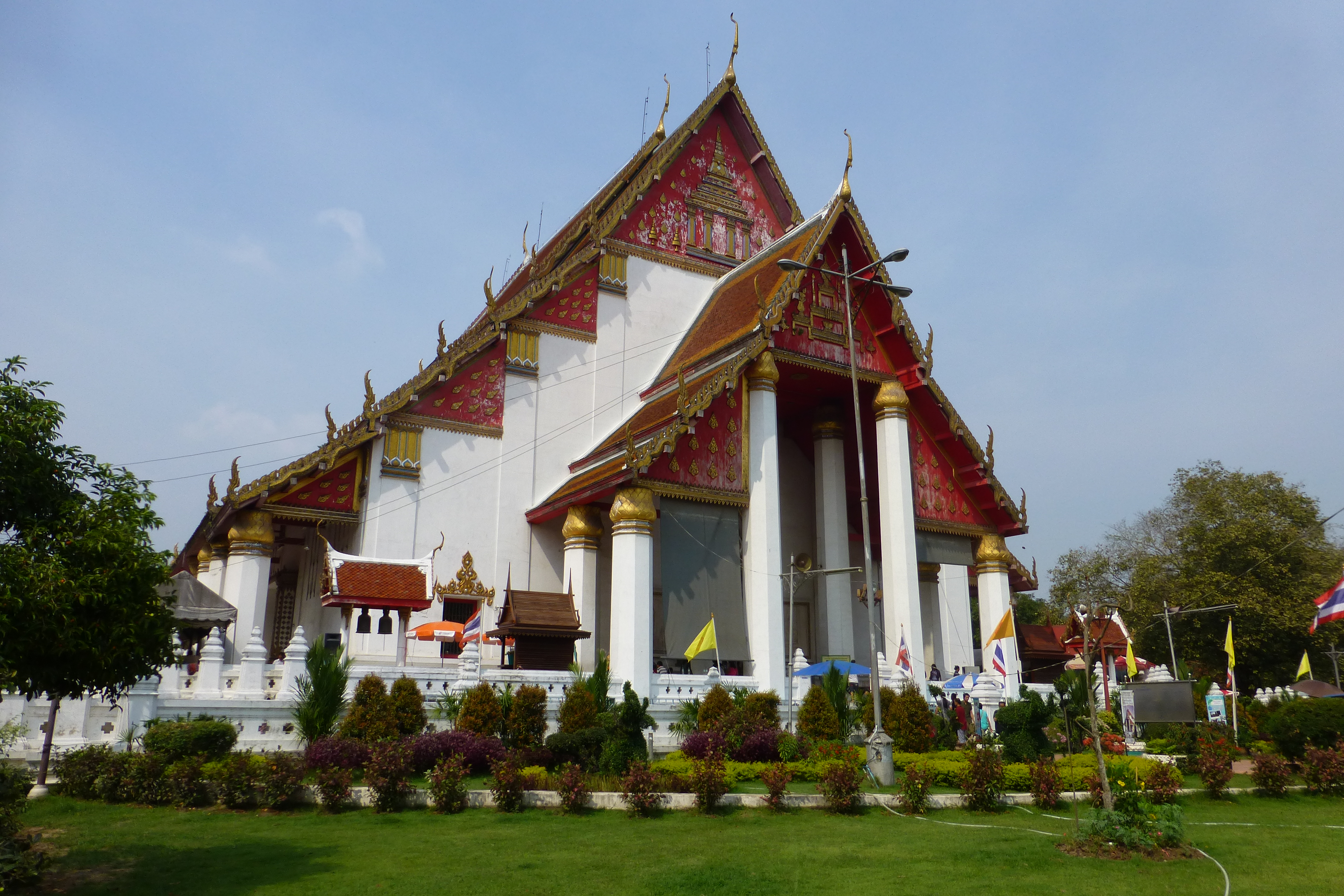
Wihan Phra Mongkhon Bopit, one of Borommakot's major projects, which transformed the 18th-century Ayutthaya skyline

==== Military and political situation to 1759 ====
Siamese Map of Central and Southern Thailand c1767

Between 1600 and 1759, warfare subsided compared with the preceding era. Narai tried unsuccessfully to capture Chiang Mai in the 1650s and 1660s. Ayutthaya fought the Nguyễn Lords of southern Vietnam for control of Cambodia from around 1715. By contrast, Ayutthaya and Restored Taungoo Burma generally maintained peaceful relations and exchanged embassies during the 17th century.

Ayutthaya's military organization remained largely unchanged for the next 150 years. The kingdom continued to rely heavily on mercenaries and failed to develop an elite military caste comparable to Japan's Samurai or the Sikh Rajputs, perhaps because its kings deliberately prevented the emergence of a warrior elite capable of challenging the throne. The city itself also benefited from the wet-season monsoons, which made it difficult to besiege for six months each year. Over time, Ayutthaya accumulated a vast stockpile of large cannons and arms that amazed the Burmese when they opened its treasury in 1767. It nevertheless lacked sufficient men to use them, as the corvée system weakened and economic integration gave phrai greater incentives to escape government control.

=== Fall of Ayutthaya ===
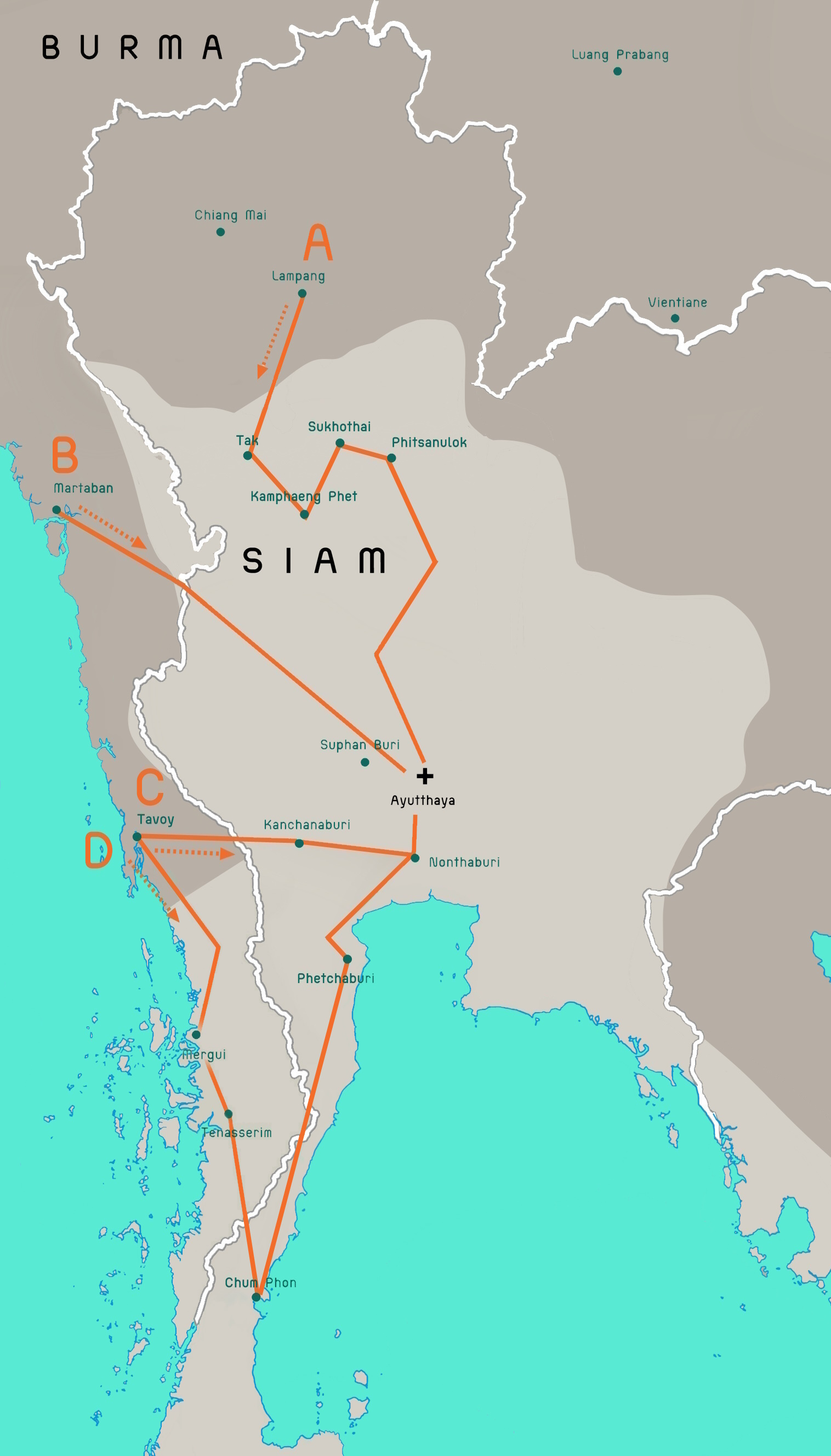
1765–1767 Burmese invasion routes

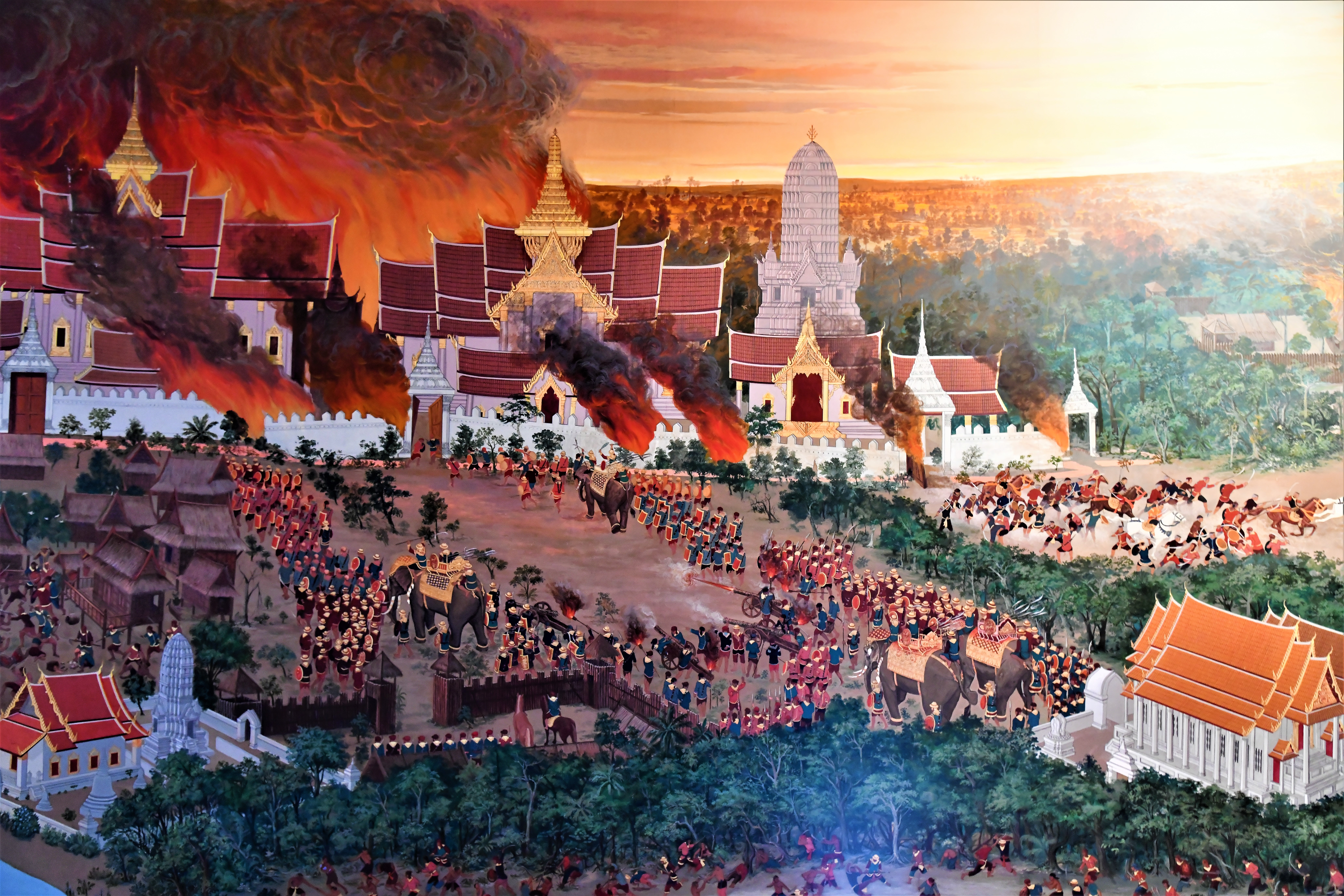
Modern depiction of the 1767 fall of Ayutthaya

The weakened Burmese Toungoo dynasty was overthrown by the Mons of Restored Hanthawaddy Kingdom in 1752. Aung Zeiya, a local Burmese leader, rebelled against the Mons, reconquered Upper Burma, proclaimed himself King Alaungpaya, and established the militaristic Konbaung dynasty. He conquered the Mons of Lower Burma in 1757, unifying Burma under his rule. In 1758, the Mons rebelled in Lower Burma against Alaungpaya but were defeated and took refuge in Siamese-held Tenasserim Coast. Alaungpaya demanded their repatriation, but Ayutthaya refused. Convinced that Siam supported the rebels, Alaungpaya also sought to expand his power and prestige in accordance with the Chakravartin ideology of universal rule.

In mid-1759, Alaungpaya marched his battle-hardened armies against Ayutthaya, conquering Tenasserim through the Singkhon Pass and reaching the northwestern outskirts of Ayutthaya city in early 1760. Ayutthaya was unprepared for war. Prolonged peace and economic prosperity had weakened the traditional conscription system, causing a shortage of manpower that undermined Siamese defenses. Panicked Ayutthayans urged the more capable temple king Uthumphon to leave the monkhood and lead the defense. Fortunately, the rainy season forced the Burmese to retreat. Alaungpaya himself was either ill or injured by a cannon explosion and died on his return to Burma in 1760. Ayutthaya was thus spared Burmese conquest for the last time.

After the Burmese retreat, Siam did little to reform its military against further invasions. Ekkathat pressured Uthumphon to return permanently to the monkhood in mid-1760 and resumed power. Prince Thepphiphit, exiled to Ceylon in 1758, became involved in a local rebellion and was repatriated to Siam in 1762, angering Ekkathat. The new Burmese king Hsinbyushin, who had participated in the 1759–1760 invasion, sought to complete his father Alaungpaya's unfinished conquest of Ayutthaya. Burma's conquest of Lanna (modern Northern Thailand) in 1763 and Laos in 1765 gave it access to substantial manpower. Hsinbyushin ordered a two-pronged invasion through the Tavoy-Tenasserim route, with 20,000 Burmese-Mon troops under Maha Nawrahta, and the Lanna route, with 20,000 Burmese-Lanna troops under Nemyo Thihapate. The armies were to converge on Ayutthaya. In early 1765, the Tavoy army conquered Western Siam, while Nemyo Thihapate invaded Northern Siam later that year. Internal rebellions and the suppression of peripheral governors left little support for the frontier defenses, and Siamese cities fell one by one. Maha Nawrahta then marched from Tavoy toward Ayutthaya in November 1765. William Powney, a British merchant trading in Ayutthaya, led British-Siamese forces against the Burmese at the Battle of Nonthaburi in December 1765 but was defeated.

The two Burmese armies converged on Ayutthaya in January 1766 and laid siege. Maha Nawrahta placed his forces at Siguk (modern Bang Ban district) west of the city, while Nemyo Thihapate occupied Paknam Prasop (Bang Pahan district) to the north. Ayutthaya initially held out because of abundant supplies and the expectation that the rainy season would force a Burmese retreat. The Burmese instead maintained their positions on flotillas and high ground. Bang Rachan camps, a group of self-defenders in Bang Rachan, resisted Burmese occupation for five months in early 1766. The Burmese reached Ayutthaya's walls in September. Meanwhile, the Qing dynasty invaded Burma in the Sino-Burmese War over the Shan States, prompting Hsinbyushin to order his commanders to complete the conquest so that troops could be diverted to the Chinese front. The besiegers constructed twenty-seven fort towers around Ayutthaya in January 1767, while surrender, anarchy, and starvation increasingly weakened the defenders. Phraya Tak, a Siamese military commander of Chinese heritage, broke through the siege in January 1767 with a group of followers and sought a new position in eastern Siam. French-Portuguese Christians and Chinese immigrants formed the last defensive line south of Ayutthaya. In March, Ekkathat's attempt to reach a truce failed. Shortly afterward, Maha Nawrahta died, leaving Nemyo Thihapate in command of the besieging forces. The Burmese then suppressed the remaining Chinese and Christian resistance in March 1767.

In April 1767, Nemyo Thihapate ordered an underground tunnel dug beneath Ayutthaya's walls and its foundations set alight, causing the northeastern section to collapse and allowing Burmese troops to enter. After fourteen months of siege, the four-century-old Siamese royal capital fell on 7 April 1767. Unlike the earlier fall of Ayutthaya in 1569, the 1767 conquest resulted in extensive and lasting destruction. Palaces and temples were burned, inhabitants were killed, and treasures and cultural artifacts were seized. Ekkathat, the last king of Ayutthaya, either died of starvation or was killed by a stray gunshot. The Buddha image of Phra Si Sanphet, which had stood at Wat Phra Si Sanphet Temple for two and a half centuries as the kingdom's palladium, was destroyed and melted for its gold.

An estimated 200,000 Siamese died during the war, while 30,000 to 100,000, including the temple king Uthumphon, members of the Ban Phlu Luang dynasty, and thousands of courtiers, were deported en masse from Central Thailand to Ava. The conquest left Siam depopulated for much of the following century. Nemyo Thihapate and the Burmese army left Ayutthaya in June 1767, leaving the Mon commander Thugyi, also called Suki, in command of a small Burmese garrison at Phosamton north of Ayutthaya. In the absence of central authority, local regimes emerged around various regional centres.

Lieberman states that "hundreds of thousands possibly died during the [1765–67] Burmese invasion." Many people were forcibly taken by the Burmese or fled into the forests, while movable objects were carried back to Burma and the rest burned. Baker and Pasuk describe the fall as both a failure of defence and of managing rising wealth. By 1767, Ayutthaya had become a prize sought by competing kingdoms. In a period when warfare was conducted more among rulers than along ethnic lines, some Siamese joined the Burmese in the sack of Ayutthaya. Ayutthaya nobles taken to Ava settled at the court according to their rank and, according to Burmese chronicles, integrated well. Historian Nidhi Eoseewong described the collapse by saying that the "kingdom fell even before the walls of Ayutthaya fell".

==== Aftermath ====
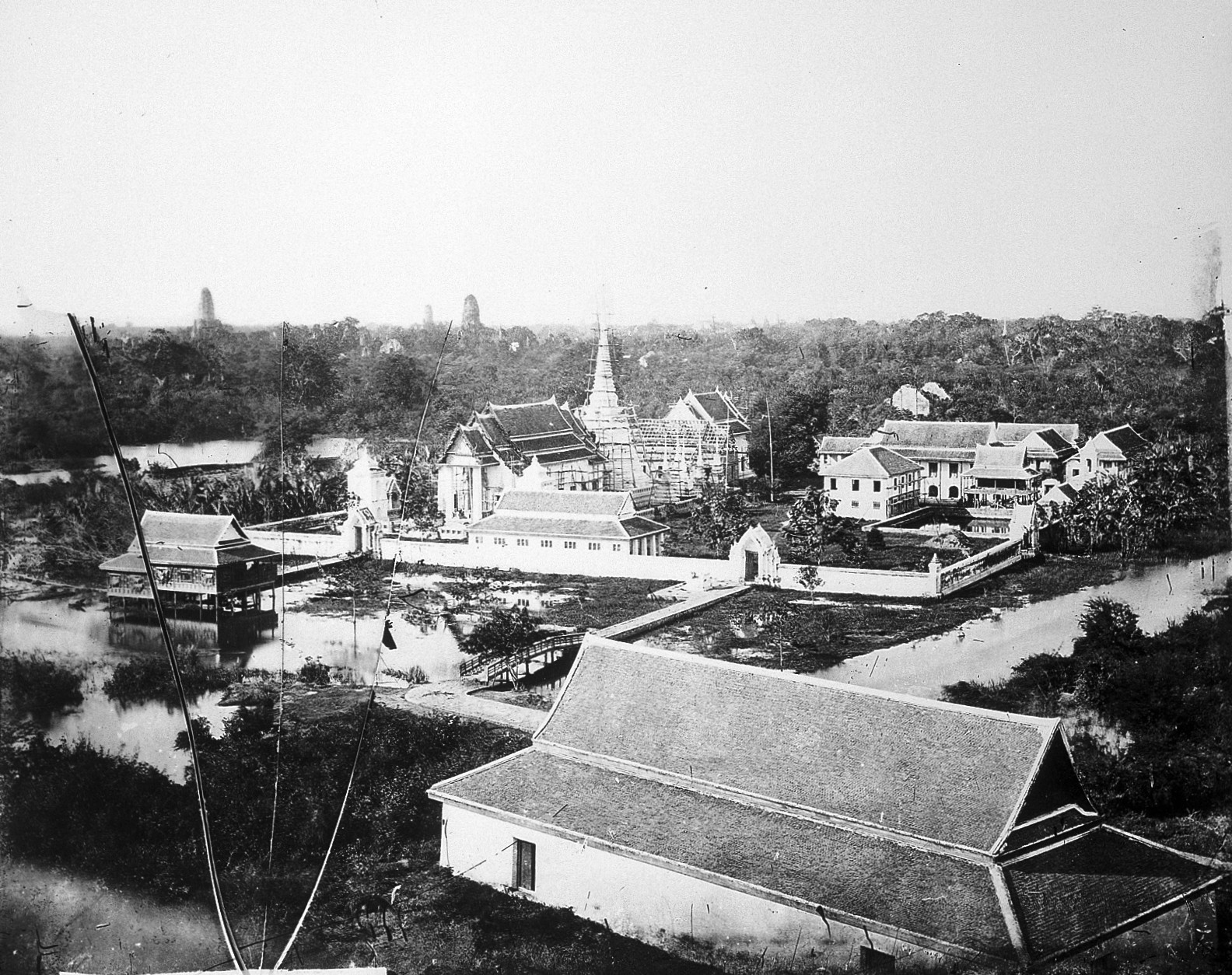
The skyline of Ayutthaya, photographed by John Thomson, early 1866

One general, Phraya Taksin, former governor of Tak and of Siamese-Chinese descent, began the reunification effort. He gathered his forces and retook Ayutthaya from the Burmese garrison at Pho Sam Thon in June 1767, using his connections with the Chinese community to gain resources and political support. He established a new capital at Thonburi, across the Chao Phraya River from present-day Bangkok, and became King Taksin. By 1771, he had defeated the local warlords and reunited Siam, except for Mergui and Tenasserim. (Note: Baker and Pasuk, and Terwiel, date the reunification to 1771, while Wyatt dates it to 1770.) The conflict with Burma continued for another 50 years, depopulating large areas of Siam, including the Northern Cities.

The palaces and temples of Ayutthaya were destroyed, and a Danish visitor described the city in 1779 as buried in undergrowth and inhabited by elephants and tigers. Yet Ayutthaya represented centuries of political and economic development that proved difficult to erase. The city was soon resettled, and its surviving temples were reused for festivals and celebrations. Post-Ayutthaya monarchs dismantled many surviving ruins to build the new capital at Bangkok, both for practical and symbolic reasons. The new elite viewed Bangkok as Ayutthaya's successor, and reusing Ayutthaya's bricks helped transfer its spiritual authority. The prospect of further Burmese invasions also left little time to build a capital by traditional methods.

== Government ==
=== Kings ===
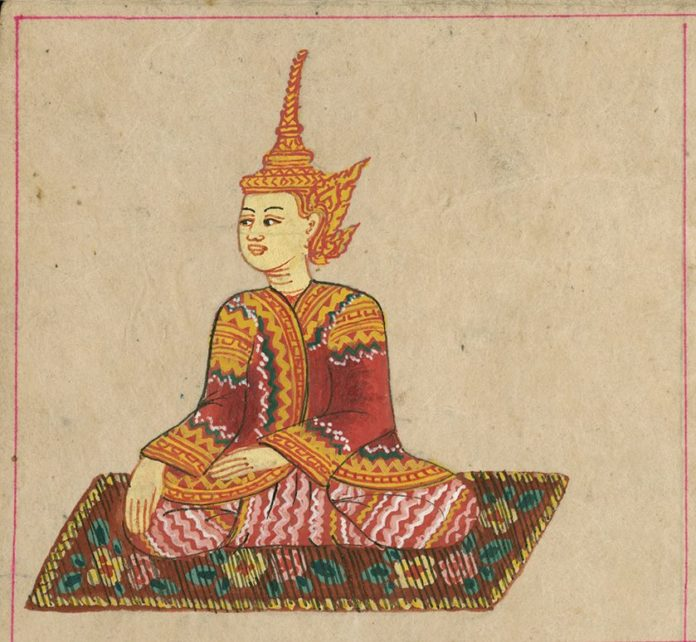
A Burmese depiction of an Ayutthaya king, either depicting Uthumphon or Ekkathat

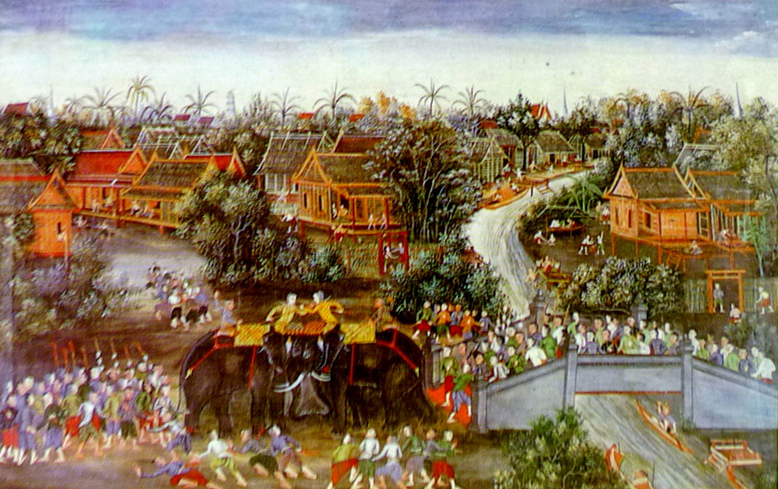
Two sons of King Intharacha fighting to the death on elephants at Pa Than Bridge

In its early maritime phase, Ayutthaya's rulers were primarily leaders of a port city. Ma Huan described the 15th-century ruler of Ayutthaya as wearing gold-trimmed pants and riding an elephant through the city with one attendant, while living in a modest residence. Ayutthaya's relationship with other cities was initially one of first among equals, requiring its rulers to balance their interests with those of their city vassals. As Ayutthaya incorporated the Northern Cities and adapted their governmental functions during the 15th and 16th centuries, its rulers became more regal and asserted greater authority over their vassals. By the 17th century, increasing wealth from trade enabled the kings to display their power through Angkorian and Brahmic rituals and symbolism.

From the 17th century onwards, Ayutthaya's kings were absolute monarchs with a semi-religious status. Their authority drew on both Hindu and Buddhist ideologies and the concept of natural kingship. At Sukhothai, Inscription 1 portrayed King Ramkhamhaeng as a paternal ruler who heard petitions from subjects who rang a bell at the palace gate.

At Ayutthaya, however, this paternal conception of kingship gave way to the ideal of the chakkraphat (Sanskrit chakravartin), a universal ruler whose adherence to the law caused the world to revolve around him. In Hindu tradition, the king was regarded as an avatar of Vishnu, the destroyer of demons and defender of the people. In Buddhist thought, he was a righteous ruler (dharmaraja) who followed the teachings of Gautama Buddha and sought the well-being of his people.

The kings' official names reflected both Hindu and Buddhist traditions. They were regarded as incarnations of Hindu deities such as Indra, Shiva, and Vishnu (Rama). The coronation ceremony was directed by brahmins, with Shiva regarded as the Hindu god and "lord of the universe". According to the codes, however, the king's ultimate duty was to protect the people and destroy evil.

In Buddhism, the king was also regarded as a bodhisattva, with temple and Buddha-image construction among his important duties as symbols of prosperity and peace. For local subjects, kingship also carried the conception of the "Lord of the Land" or "He who Rules the Earth" (Phra Chao Phaendin). Court etiquette required the use of Rachasap (Rājāśabda, "royal language") when communicating with or about royalty. Under the sakna or sakdina system, codified by King Borommatrailokkanat (1448–1488), the king was said to grant control over land to subjects ranging from nobles to commoners. The system was similar to, but distinct from, feudalism, under which the monarch did not own the land.

Although there is no concrete evidence that this land-management system constituted a formal palace economy, the French François-Timoléon de Choisy, who visited Ayutthaya in 1685, wrote that "the king has absolute power" and was regarded as a god by the Siamese. The Dutch writer Jan van Vliet similarly remarked in the 17th century that the king of Siam was "honoured and worshipped by his subjects second to god." The king issued laws and orders and sometimes served as the highest judge, deciding cases involving major criminals such as traitors and rebels.

In addition to the sakdina system, one of Borommatrailokkanat's institutional innovations was the adoption of the uparaja, translated as "viceroy" or "prince" and usually held by the king's senior son or full brother. The position was intended to regularise succession in a polygamous dynasty, but in practice it created inherent tensions between the king and uparaja and frequent succession disputes.

The power of the Ayutthaya throne nevertheless had limits. Royal authority depended heavily on the king's personal prestige, age, and network of supporters, and the absence of sufficient support could lead to violent coups. Generals, particularly the Kalahom, the minister of the military, were among the most powerful figures in the capital. During the last century of Ayutthaya, conflicts among princes and generals over the throne repeatedly destabilised the court.

With the exception of Naresuan's succession by Ekathotsarot in 1605, "the method of royal succession at Ayutthaya throughout the seventeenth century was battle." Although European visitors sought to identify rules governing Siamese succession, noting that the dead king's younger brother often succeeded him, this custom was not formally enshrined. The reigning king often designated a preferred successor as uparaja, but succession was effectively an "elimination process": any male member of the royal clan, usually the late king's brothers and sons, could claim the throne and prevail by defeating his rivals. Noble factions, foreign merchants, and foreign mercenaries also rallied behind preferred candidates in expectation of benefiting from the outcome.

=== Mandala system ===
Ayutthaya followed the mandala system, commonly used by Southeast Asian kingdoms before the 19th century. In the 17th century, its monarchs frequently appointed non-natives as governors of controlled towns and cities to limit competition from the nobility. By the late Ayutthaya period, the capital exerted strong influence over polities in the lower Chao Phraya plain, but its control weakened with distance from Ayutthaya. Thai historian Sunait Chutintaranond notes that "the view that Ayudhya was a strong centralized state" did not hold and that "in Ayudhya the hegemony of provincial governors was never successfully eliminated."

== Political development ==
=== Social classes ===
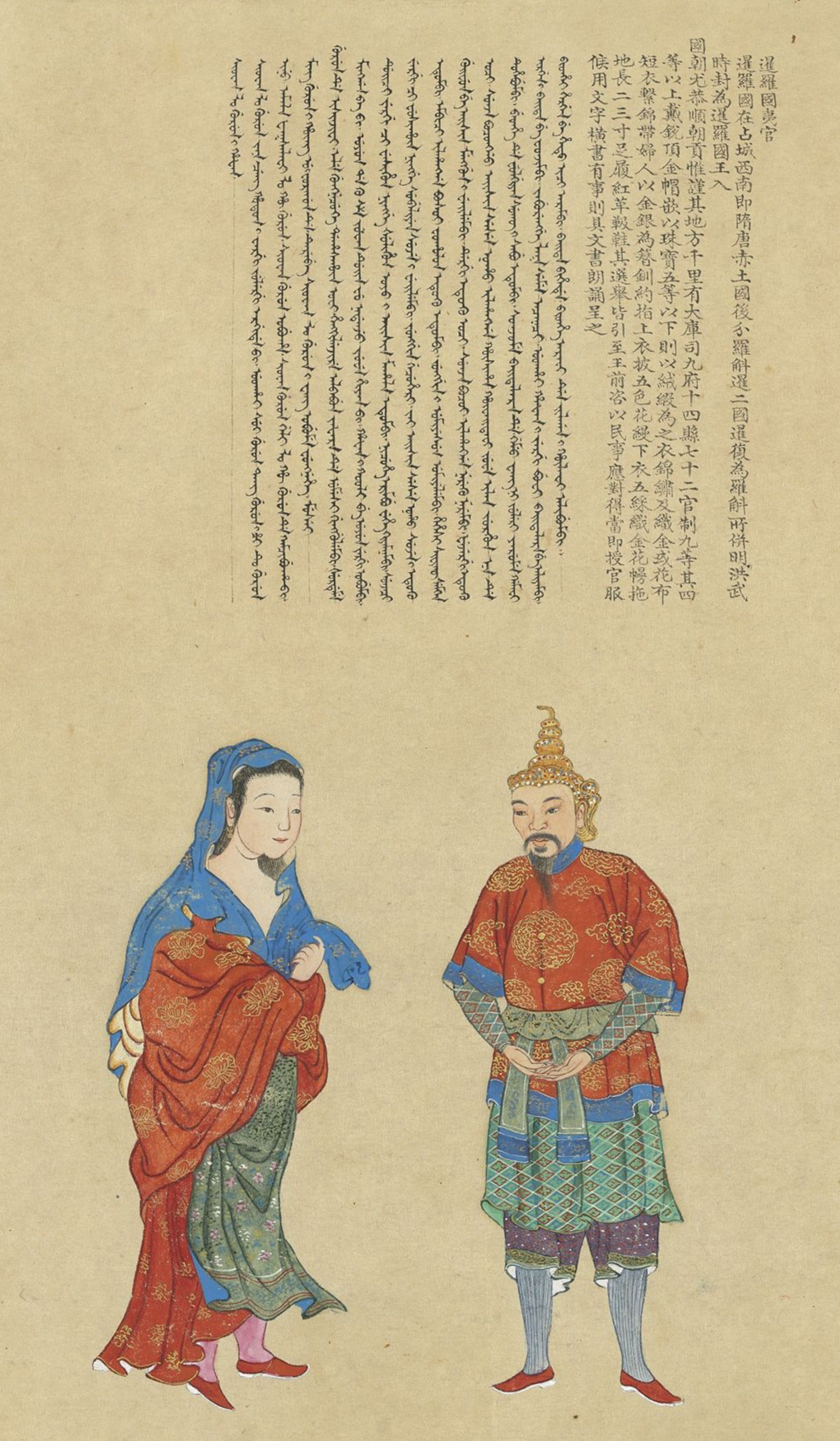
Siamese state officials, from Xie Sui's 18th-century Portraits of Periodical Offering of Imperial Qing, National Palace Museum, Taipei

The reforms of King Borommatrailokkanat (r. 1448–1488) placed the king of Ayutthaya at the centre of a highly stratified social and political hierarchy extending throughout the realm. Although evidence is limited, the basic unit of social organization is thought to have been the village community, composed of extended family households. Title to land resided with the headman, who held it on behalf of the community, while peasant proprietors retained its use as long as they cultivated it. Local lords gradually became courtiers (อำมาตย์) or tributary rulers of minor cities. The king came to be regarded as the earthly incarnation of Shiva or Vishnu and as the sacred focus of politico-religious cult practices conducted by royal court Brahmans within the Buddhist court establishment. In the Buddhist context, the devaraja (divine king) was regarded as a bodhisattva. Belief in divine kingship persisted into the 18th century, although its religious significance had by then diminished.

=== Ranking of social classes ===
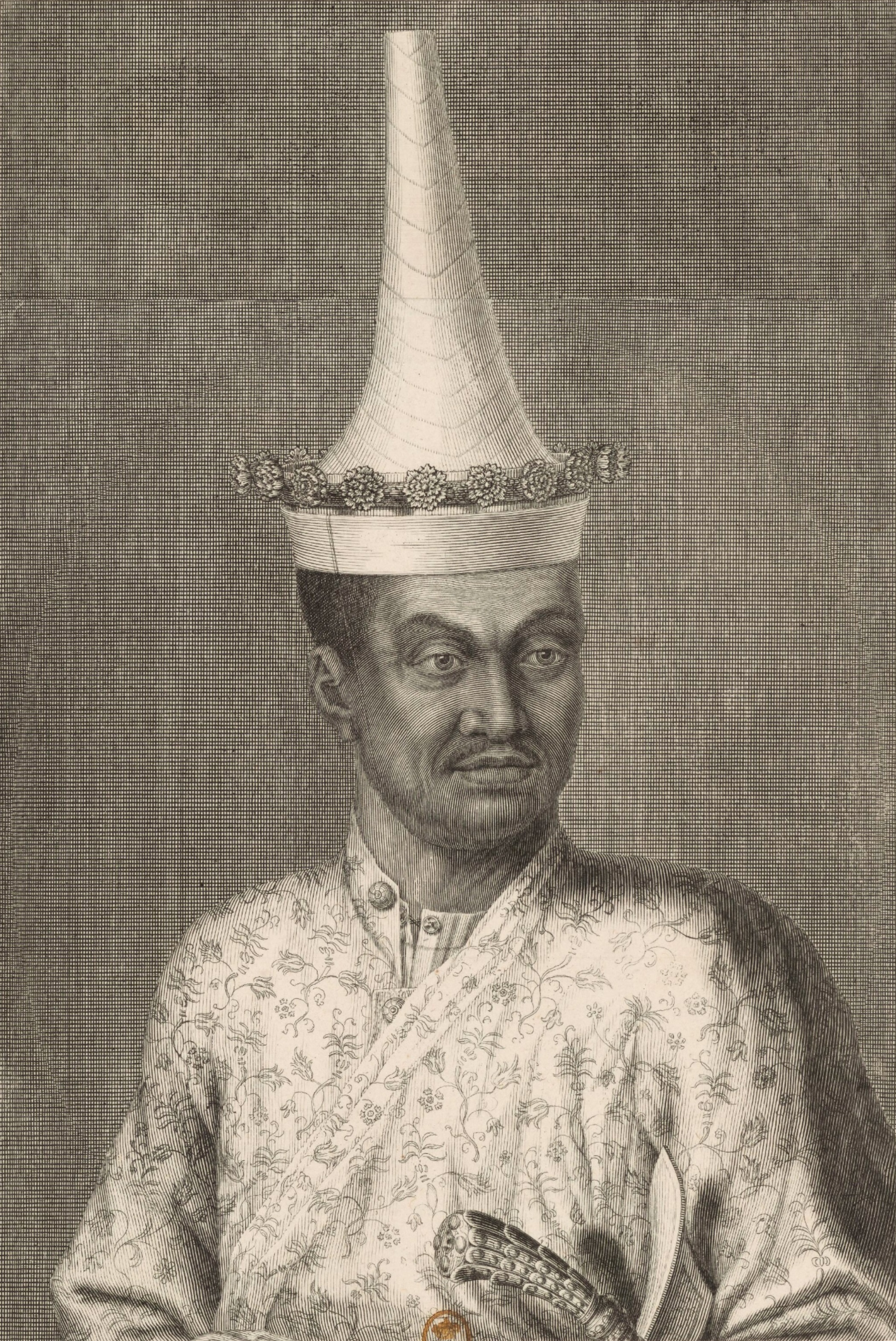
The Ayutthayan official Kosa Pan wearing Lomphok and Khrui signifying status

With ample land available for cultivation, the realm depended on securing sufficient manpower for agriculture and defense. Ayutthaya's expansion involved constant warfare, and because no regional power possessed a decisive technological advantage, battles were usually determined by army size. Victorious campaigns brought conquered people into Ayutthaya, where they were assimilated into the labour force. Ramathibodi II (r. 1491–1529) established a corvée system requiring every freeman to register as a phrai (servant) under a local lord, chao nai (เจ้านาย). A clause of the Law on the Institution of Litigation shows freemen already registered under a mun nai in 1356. In wartime, male phrai could be conscripted. Above the phrai was a nai (นาย), who was responsible for military service and corvée labour on public works and the land of his assigned official. Phrai Suay (ไพร่ส่วย) instead fulfilled their obligations through taxation. A phrai could also sell himself as a that (ทาส, "slave") to another lord, who compensated the former nai for the loss of corvée labour. Phrai constituted as much as one-third of the manpower supply into the 19th century.

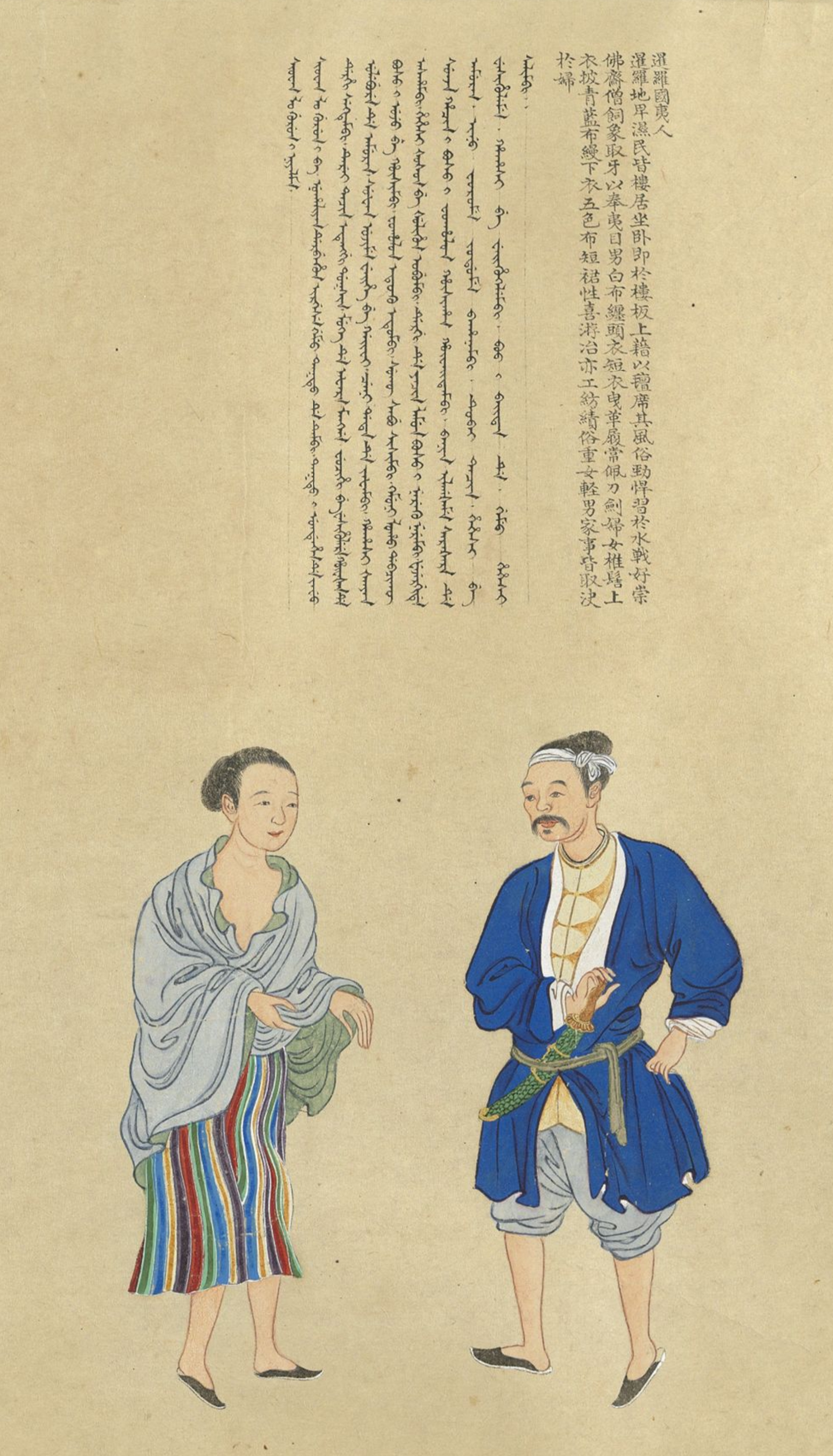
Siamese aristocrats, from Xie Sui's Portraits of Periodical Offering of Imperial Qing, National Palace Museum, Taipei

Wealth, status, and political influence were closely interrelated. Under the sakdina system, the king allotted rice fields to court officials, provincial governors, and military commanders in return for their services. Thai social scientists such as Jit Phumisak and Kukrit Pramoj have extensively examined the system. An official's allotment was determined by the number of commoners or phrai he could command, which in turn determined his status and wealth within the hierarchy. At its apex stood the king, symbolically the realm's largest landholder and, in theory, commander of the most phrai. These phrai luang ("royal servants") paid taxes, served in the royal army, and worked crown lands.

Military recruitment, however, depended on nai or mun nai, literally "lord", officials who commanded their own phrai som ("subjects"). These officials were required to answer the king's call in wartime, making them key figures in kingdom politics. At least two officials staged coups and seized the throne, while conflicts between kings and officials, followed by purges of court officials, were recurrent.

Borommatrailokkanat fixed those allotments by law in 1454, in the Law of the Civil Hierarchy and the Law of Military and Provincial Hierarchies. The scale ran from five sakdina for a slave and twenty-five for a freeman to ten thousand for a chief minister. The structure they set remained in place until officials began receiving salaries in the 19th century.

Social hierarchy in the Ayutthaya era of Siam

Social class	Description
munnai	Tax-exempt administrative elite in the capital and administrative centres.
phrai luang	Royal servicemen who worked a specified period each year (possibly six months) for the crown. They were normally prevented from leaving their village except to perform corvées or military services.
phrai som	Commoners with no obligation to the crown. They vastly outnumbered the phrai luang.

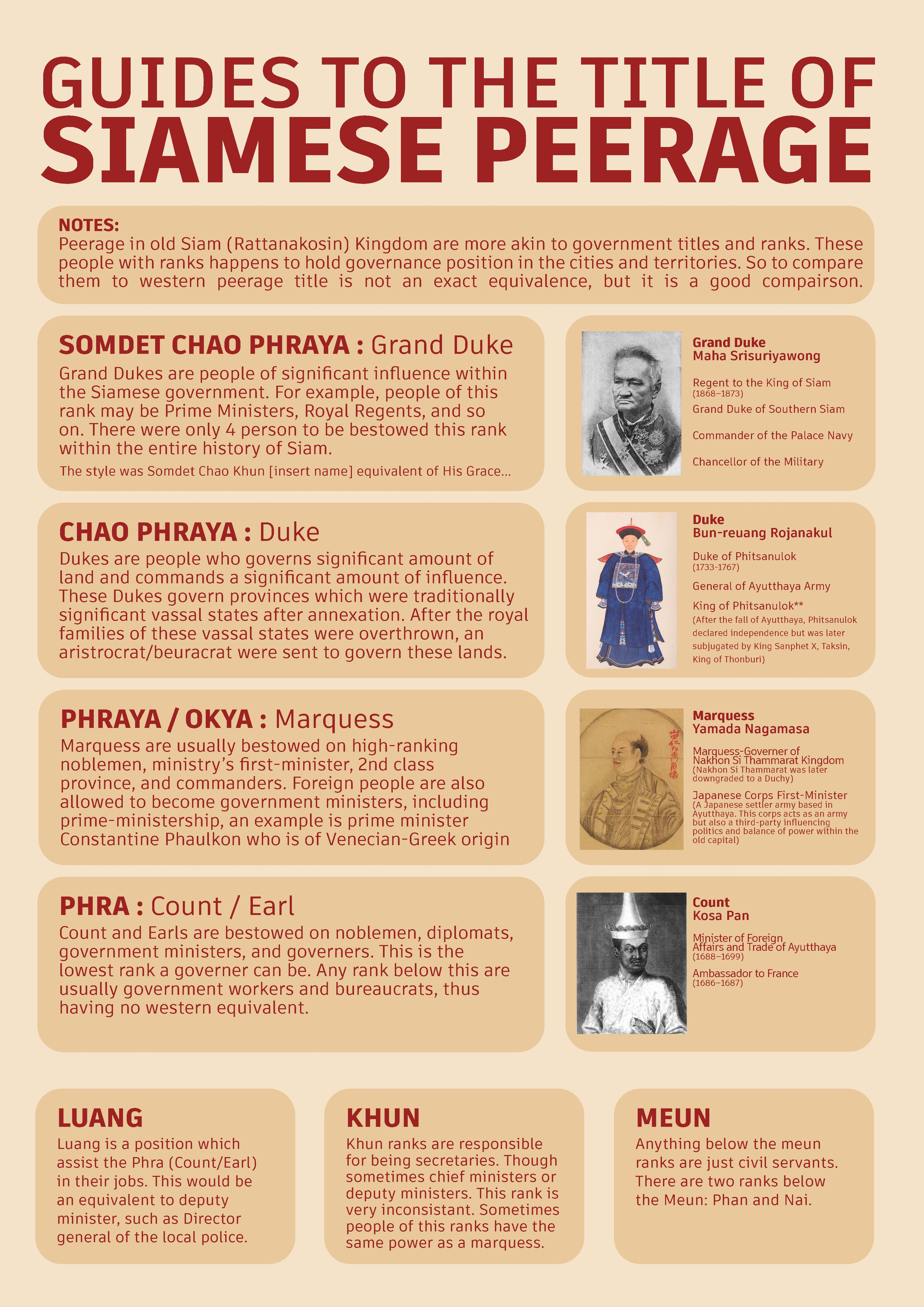
Ayutthayan peerage system

Outside this system to some extent were the sangha, the Buddhist monastic community, which all classes of men could join, and the overseas Chinese. The Chinese were not obliged to register for corvée and could move about the kingdom and trade at will. By the 16th century the Chinese controlled Ayutthaya's internal trade and held important places in civil and military service.

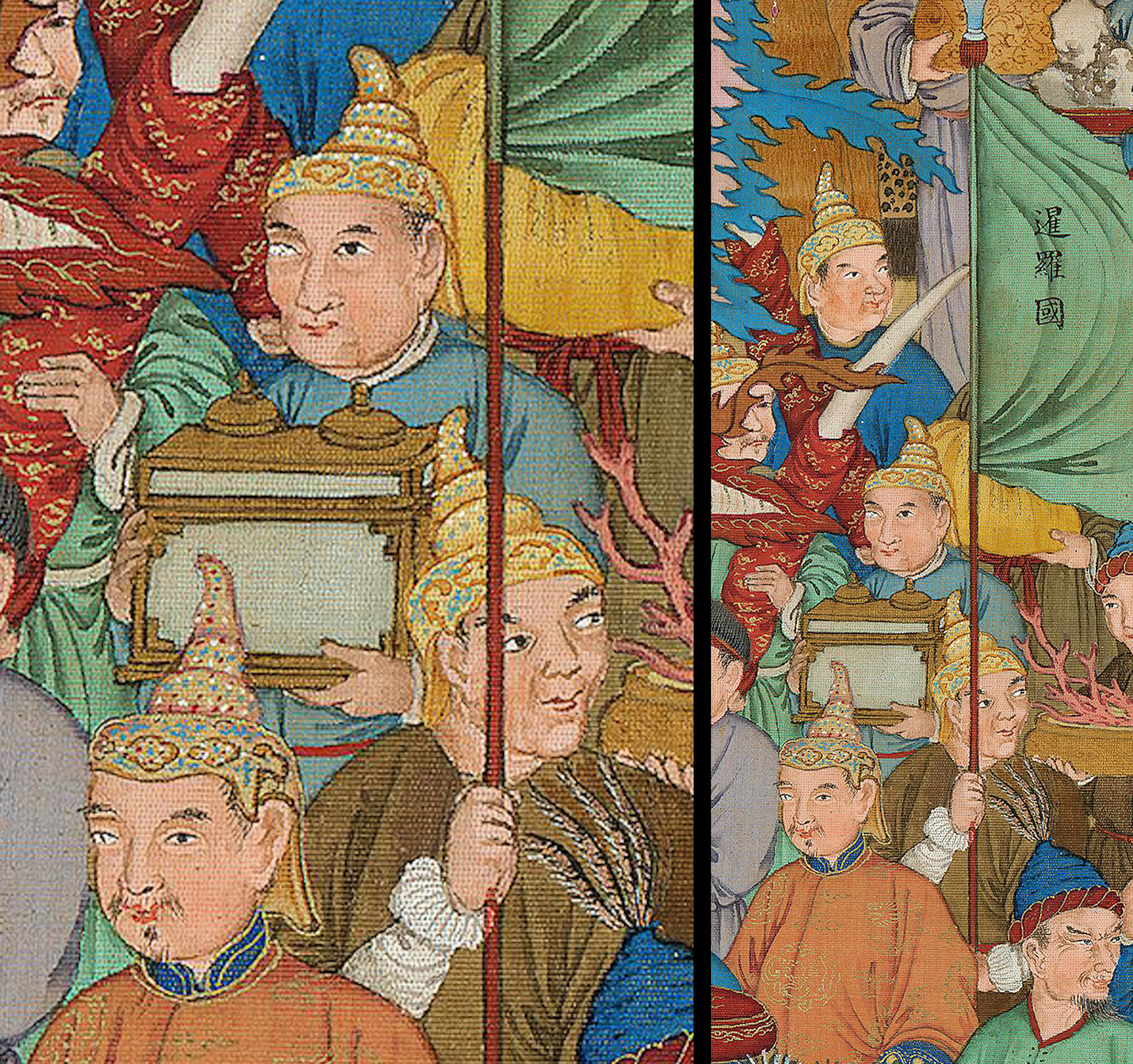
Siam delegates (暹罗国) in Peking in 1761. 万国来朝图.

Uthong was responsible for the compilation of a Dharmaśāstra, a legal code based on Hindu sources and traditional Thai custom. The Dharmaśāstra remained a tool of Thai law until late in the 19th century. A bureaucracy based on a hierarchy of ranked and titled officials was introduced, and society was organized in a related manner. However, the caste system was not adopted.

Determined to prevent another treason like his father's, Naresuan set about unifying the country's administration directly under the royal court at Ayutthaya. He ended the practice of nominating royal princes to govern Ayutthaya's provinces, assigning instead court officials who were expected to execute policies handed down by the king. Thereafter royal princes were confined to the capital. Their power struggles continued, but at court under the king's watchful eye.

To ensure his control over the new class of governors, Naresuan decreed that all freemen subject to phrai service had become phrai luang, bound directly to the king, who distributed the use of their services to his officials. This measure gave the king a theoretical monopoly on all manpower, and the idea developed that since the king owned the services of all the people, he also possessed all the land. Ministerial offices and governorships – and the sakdina that went with them – were usually inherited positions dominated by a few families often connected to the king by marriage. Indeed, marriage was frequently used by Thai kings to cement alliances between themselves and powerful families, a custom prevailing through the 19th century. As a result of this policy, the king's wives usually numbered in the dozens.

Even with Naresuan's reforms the royal government remained uneven. Royal power outside the crown lands was absolute in theory and limited in practice by a lax civil administration. It did not reach far beyond the capital, as the desertion of the provinces in the war of the late 18th century showed.

=== Military ===
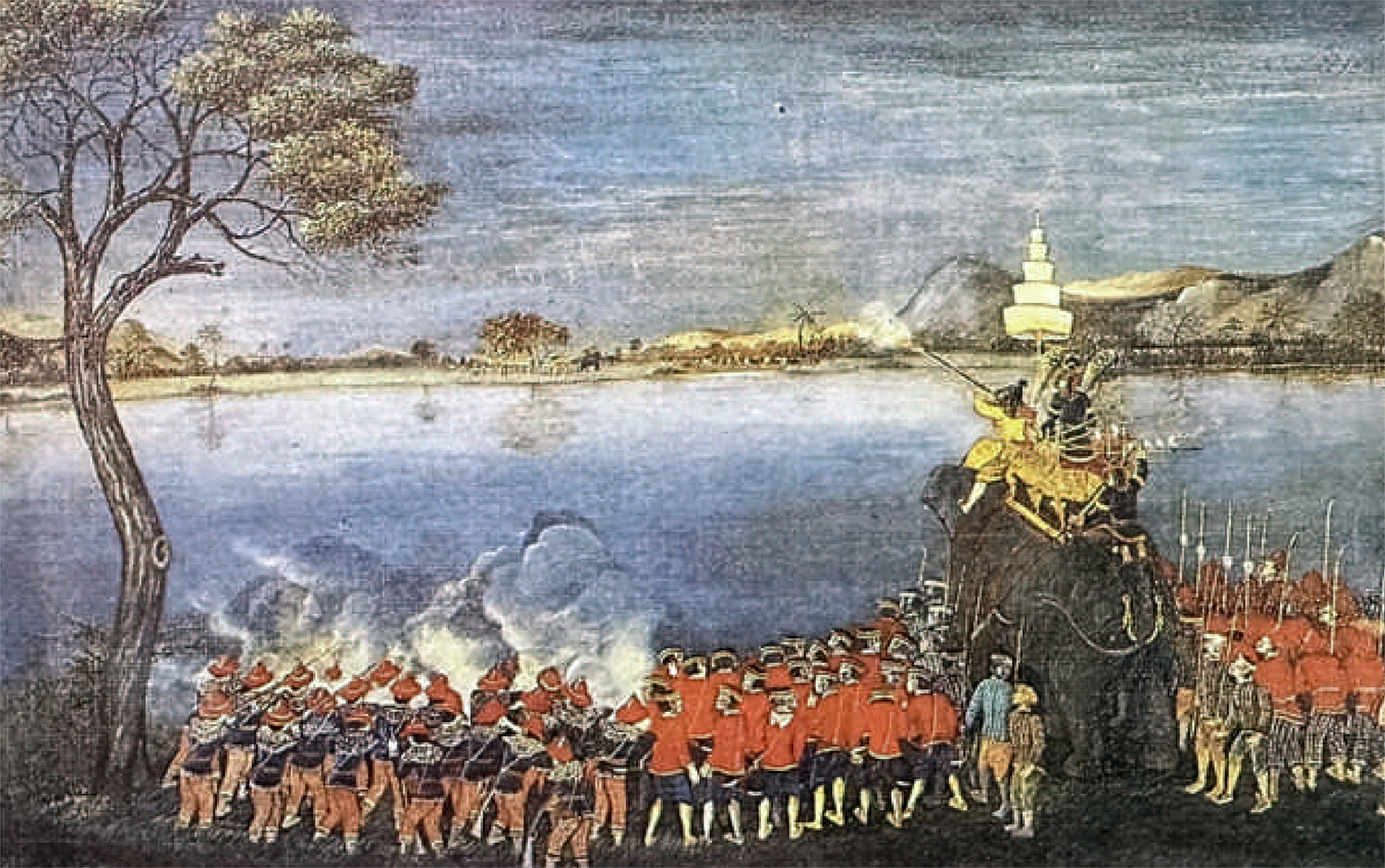
Illustration of King Naresuan firing at Surakamma across the Sittaung River. The painting depicts Naresuan sitting on an elephant, shooting and killing general Surakamma of the Taungoo Dynasty at the Sittaung river in Burma. Naresuan used his personal, custom matchlock musket in Battle of the Sittaung River 1584

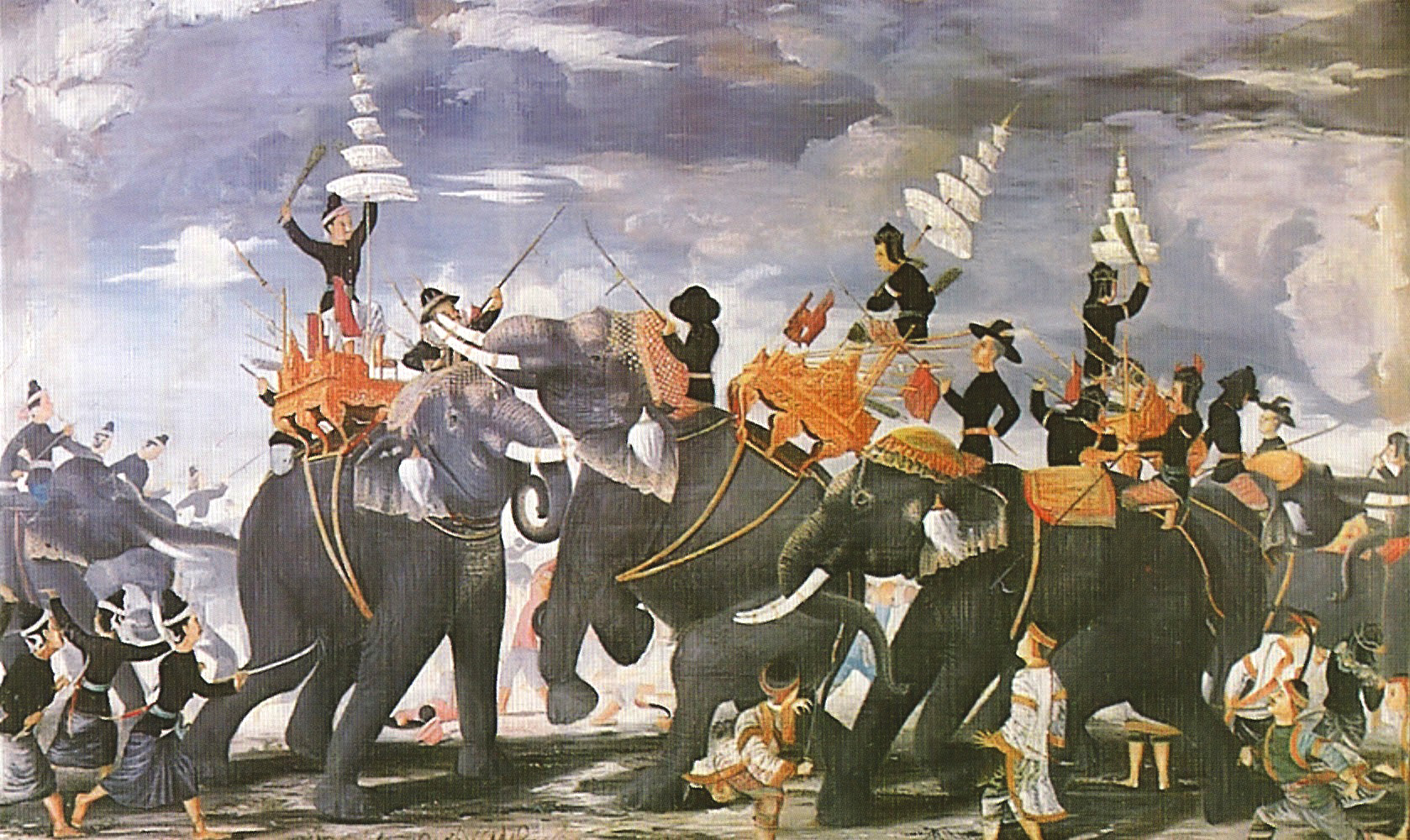
Painting of the battle between Queen Suriyothai and Thado Dhamma Yaza I of Prome in 1548 during the Burmese–Siamese War (1547–1549)

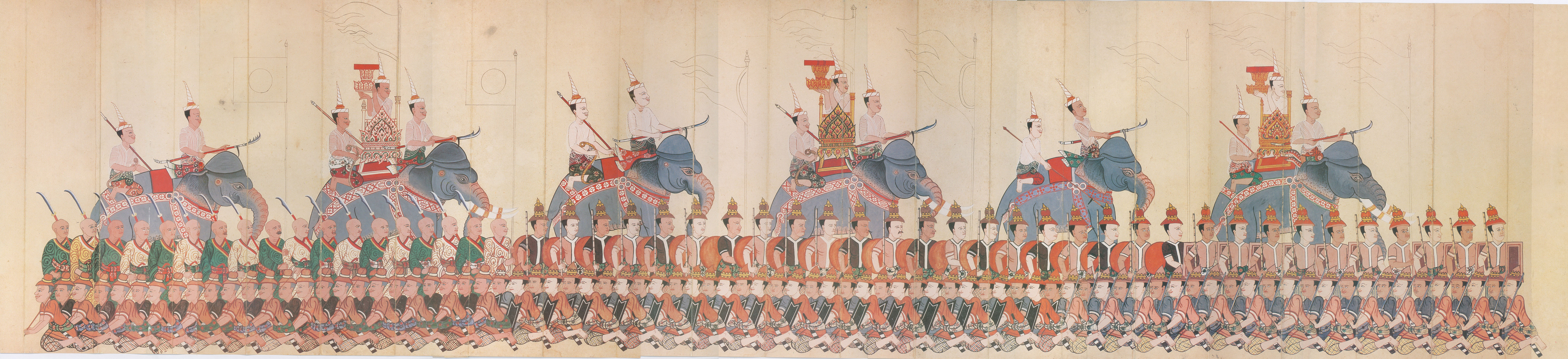
A royal procession ("Krabuan Phayuhayattra" (กระบวนพยุหยาตรา)) during the reign of King Narai the Great (1656–1688)

Ayutthaya's military was the origin of the Royal Thai Army. The army was organized into a small standing army of a few thousand, which defended the capital and the palace, and a much larger conscript-based wartime army. Conscription was based on the phrai system (including phrai luang and phrai som), which required local chiefs to supply their predetermined quota of men from their jurisdiction on the basis of population in times of war. This basic system of military organization was largely unchanged down to the early Rattanakosin period.

The main weaponry of the infantry largely consisted of swords, spears and bow and arrows. The infantry units were supported by cavalry and elephantry corps.

=== Territory ===
According to a French source, Ayutthaya in the 18th century included these principal cities: Martaban, Ligor or Nakhon Sri Thammarat, Tenasserim, Junk Ceylon or Phuket Island, Singora or Songkhla. Her tributaries were Patani, Pahang, Perak, Kedah and Malacca.

Particularly in the South, Ayutthaya's claims were often discredited or underplayed by the Malay sultanates, resulting in a number of military expeditions starting in the 17th and 18th centuries to subjugate querulous sultanates. These included King Narai's military expedition to the Sultanate of Singora in 1680.

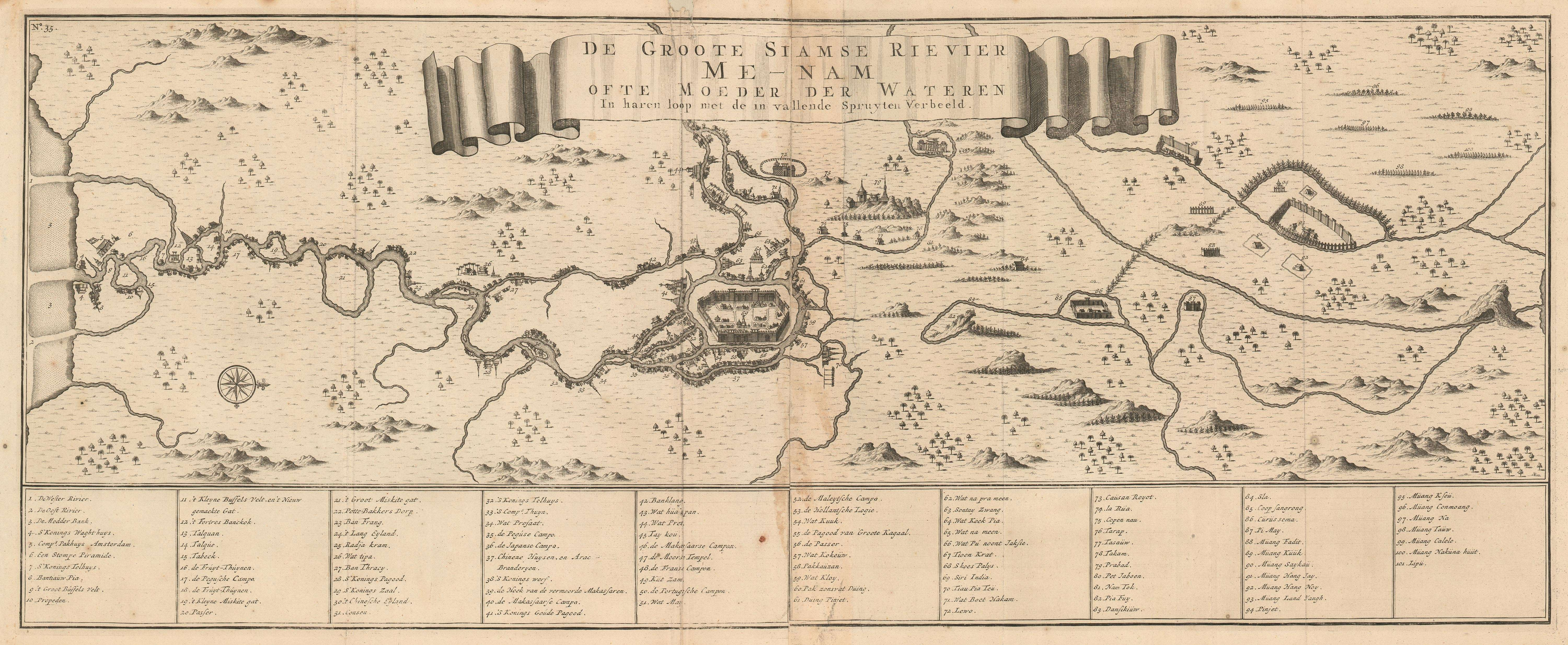
Chao Phraya River in Siam (Ayutthaya) map by Valentijn 1726

== Culture and society ==
=== Population ===
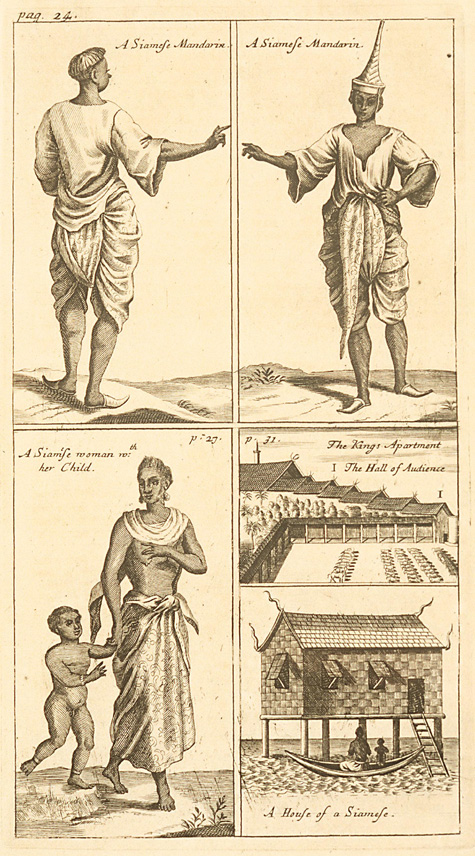
Siamese officials, a woman and child, and late 17th-century architecture, as drawn by Simon de la Loubère

Throughout its existence the kingdom was run by a service nobility of a few thousand, with the rest of the population serfs (phrai), a structure comparable to the contemporary Ancien Regime in France or Feudalism elsewhere in Europe. The social ladder existed during times of war and, particularly during the late Ayutthaya period, of rich commoners challenging the societal status quo of the Ayutthaya Kingdom as a result of commercial prosperity during the kingdom's last 150 years of peaceful existence.

According to the historian Baker, the Ayutthaya peasantry practiced commuter agriculturalism and largely lived in dense areas along the canals leading up to the city of Ayutthaya and other cities within the kingdom, producing homemade goods and textiles for the international market.

=== Language ===
What is now known as the Siamese (Thai) language was initially spoken only by the Ayutthaya elite, while everyday people throughout the Chao Phraya delta spoke a medley of Mon, Khmer, and Tai dialects. The Portuguese Tomé Pires described in the early 16th century that "The people [of Siam], and almost the language, are like those of [Mon] Pegu," which may suggest that many or most common people still did not identify with the Tai-language culture of the elites as late as 1515. By the Late Ayutthaya period (1688–1767), the Siamese language and culture had gradually grown to transcend social classes and had been adopted by many of the local people throughout the kingdom.

The Khmer language was an early prestige language of the Ayutthaya court, until it was supplanted by the Siamese language. However it was still continually spoken by the ethnic Khmer community living in Ayutthaya. Many variants of Chinese were spoken in the Ayutthaya Kingdom, with the Chinese becoming a large minority in the kingdom during the Late Ayutthaya period.

Various minor minority languages spoken in the Ayutthaya Kingdom included Malay, Persian, Japanese, Cham, Dutch, and Portuguese.

=== Religion ===
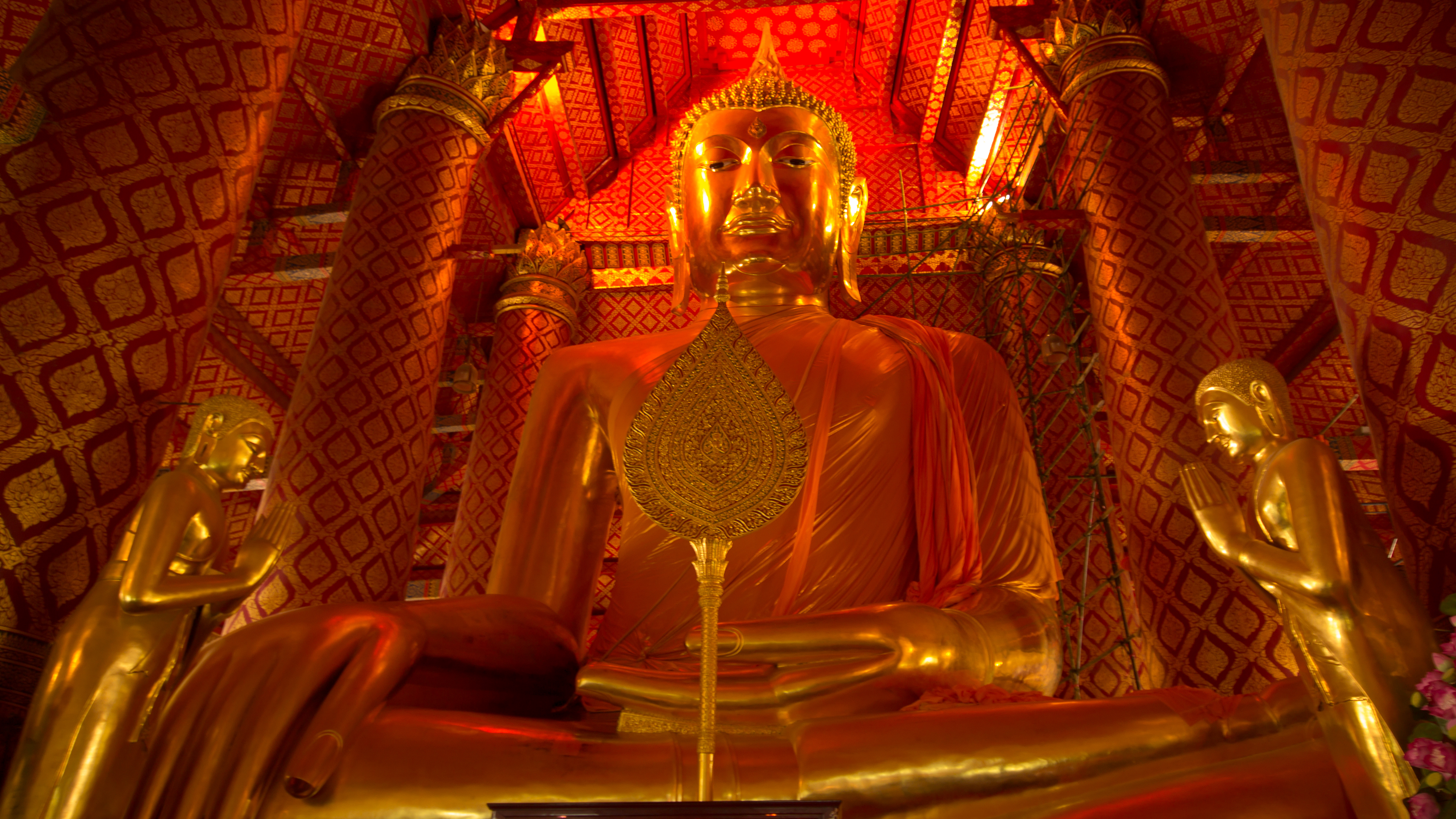
The 19-metre (62 ft) gold-covered seated Buddha of Wat Phanan Choeng, built in 1324 and so older than the city's traditional foundation date of 1351

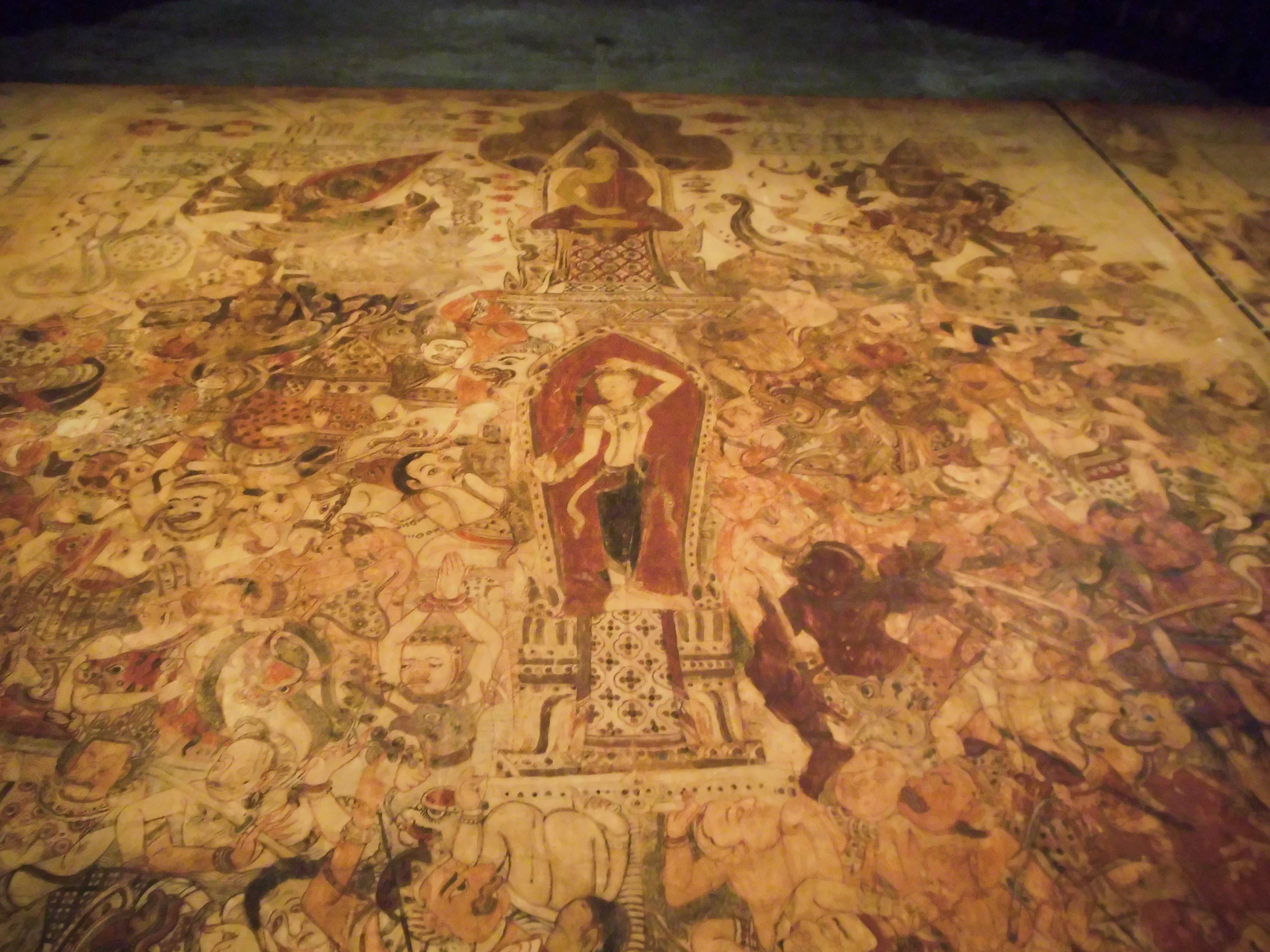
Buddhist mural at Wat Ko Kaew Suttharam, Phetchaburi; mural painting flourished in the late Ayutthaya period

Ayutthaya's main religion was Theravada Buddhism. However, many of the elements of the political and social system were incorporated from Hindu scriptures and were conducted by Brahmin priests. Many areas of the kingdom also practiced Mahayana Buddhism, Islam and Christianity, influenced by French Missionaries who arrived through China in the 17th century. Some small areas converted to Roman Catholicism. The influence of Mahayana and Tantric practices also entered Theravada Buddhism, producing a tradition called Boran Kammatthana.

The natural world was also home to a number of spirits which are part of the Satsana Phi. Phi (ผี) are spirits of buildings or territories, natural places, or phenomena; they are also ancestral spirits that protect people, or can also include malevolent spirits. The phi which are guardian deities of places, or towns are celebrated at festivals with communal gatherings and offerings of food. The spirits run throughout Thai folklore.

Phi were believed to influence natural phenomena including human illness and thus the baci became an important part of people identity and religious health over the millennia. Spirit houses were an important folk custom which were used to ensure balance with the natural and supernatural world. Astrology was also a vital part to understanding the natural and spiritual worlds and became an important cultural means to enforce social taboos and customs.

=== Arts and performances ===
==== Khon theatre ====
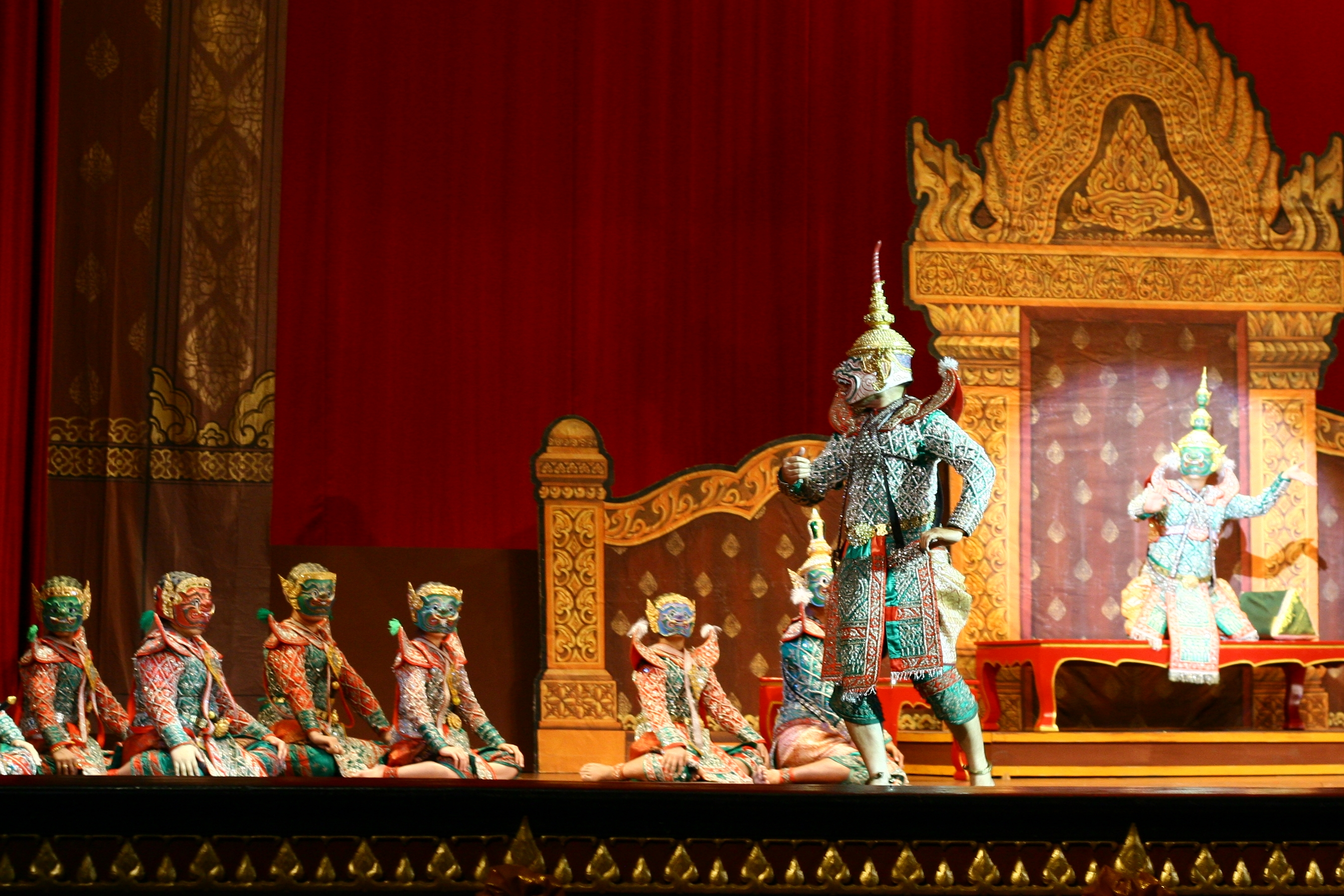
Khon performance, a famous dance in the Ayutthaya period

The myth and epic stories of Ramakien provide the Siamese with a rich source of dramatic materials. The royal court of Ayutthaya developed classical dramatic forms of expression called khon (โขน) and lakhon (ละคร). Ramakien played a role in shaping these dramatic arts. During the Ayutthaya period, khon, or a dramatized version of Ramakien, was classified as lakhon nai or a theatrical performance reserved only for aristocratic audience. The Siamese drama and classical dance later spread throughout mainland Southeast Asia and influenced the development of high-culture art in most countries, including Burma, and Laos.

Historical evidence shows that the Thai art of stage plays must have already been highly evolved by the 17th century. Louis XIV, the Sun King of France, had a formal diplomatic relation with Ayutthaya's King Narai. In 1687, France sent the diplomat Simon de la Loubère to record all that he saw in the Siamese Kingdom. In his famous account Du Royaume de Siam, La Loubère carefully observed the classic 17th century theatre of Siam, including an epic battle scene from a khon performance, and recorded what he saw in great detail:

The Siamese have three sorts of Stage Plays: That which they call Cone [khôn] is a figure dance, to the sound of the violin and some other instruments. The dancers are masked and armed, and represent rather a combat than a dance. And though every one runs into high motions, and extravagant postures, they cease not continually to intermix some word. Most of their masks are hideous, and represent either monstrous Beasts, or kinds of Devils. The Show which they call Lacone is a poem intermix with Epic and Dramatic, which lasts three days, from eight in the morning till seven at night. They are histories in verse, serious, and sung by several actors always present, and which do only sing reciprocally … The Rabam is a double dance of men and women, which is not martial, but gallant … they can perform it without much tying themselves, because their way of dancing is a simple march round, very slow, and without any high motion; but with a great many slow contortions of the body and arms.

Of the attire of Siamese Khôn dancers, La Loubère recorded that, "[T]hose that dance in Rabam, and Cone, have gilded paper-bonnets, high and pointed, like the Mandarins caps of ceremony, but which hang down at the sides below their ears, which are adorned with counterfeit stones, and with two pendants of gilded wood."

==== Muay Thai ====
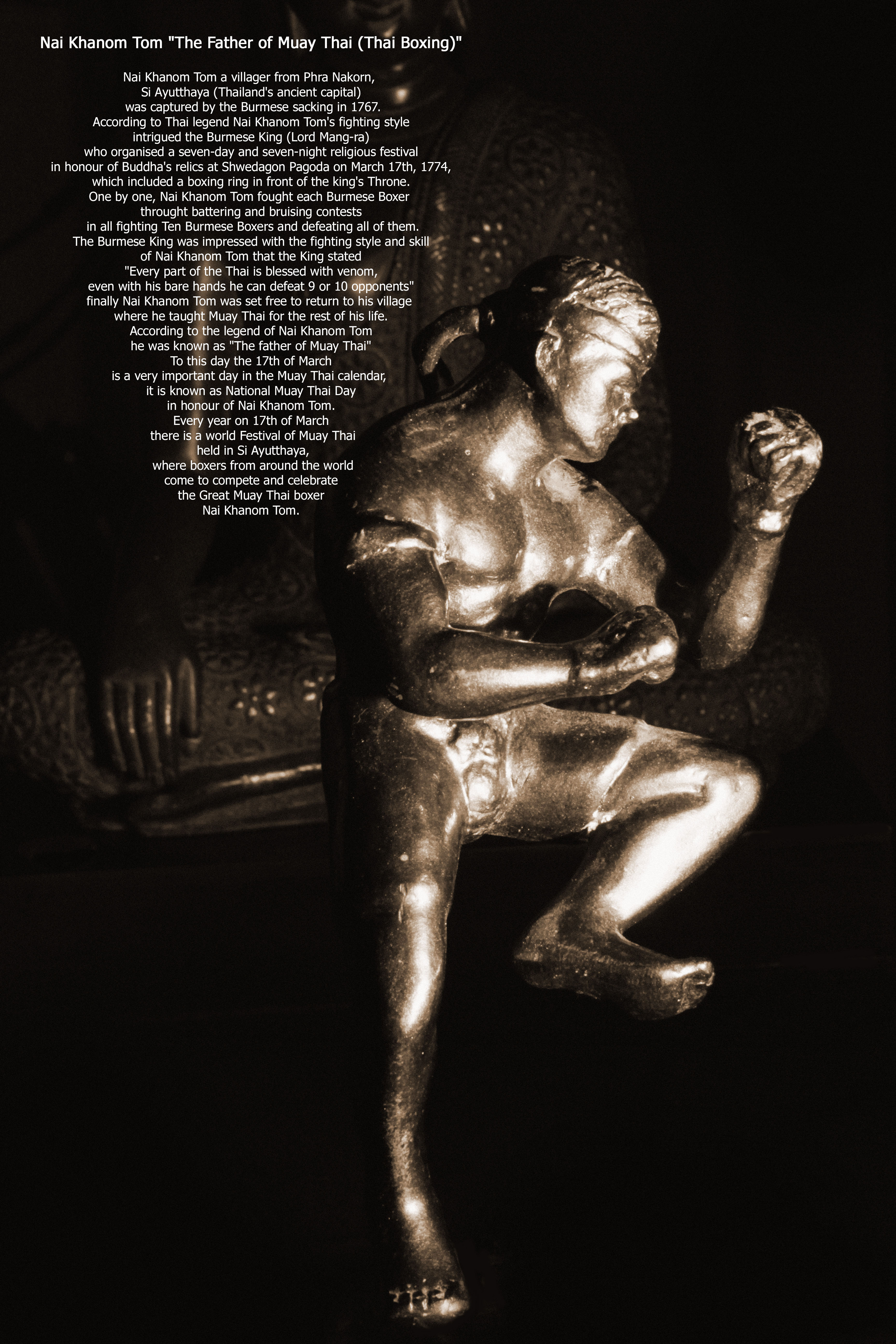
Nai Khanom Tom, the legendary Ayutthaya-era fighter celebrated as the Father of Muay Thai

La Loubère also observed the existence of muay Thai and muay Laos, noting that they looked similar (i.e., using both fists and elbows to fight) but the hand-wrapping techniques were different. Muay Thai from the Ayutthaya period (better known as Muay Boran) would greatly influence the modern sport of Muay Thai.

The accomplishment and influence of Thai art and culture, developed during the Ayutthaya period, on the neighboring countries was evident in the observation of James Low, a British scholar on Southeast Asia, during the early Rattanakosin era: "The Siamese have attained to a considerable degree of perfection in dramatic exhibitions – and are in this respect envied by their neighbours the Burmans, and Laos who all employ Siamese actors when they can be got."

Krabi-krabong is a form of sword fighting developed in Ayutthaya that is now recognized as an essential element of traditional Thai culture and arts. Wat Phutthaisawan, a major ancient temple in Ayutthaya, is considered to be the birthplace of krabi-krabong.

==== Barge procession ====
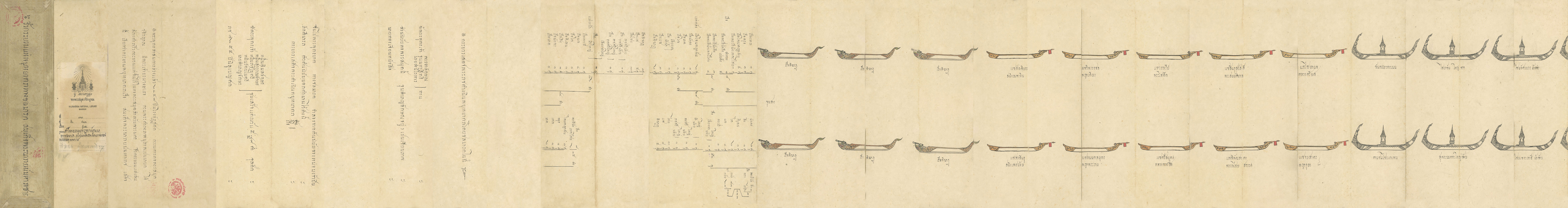
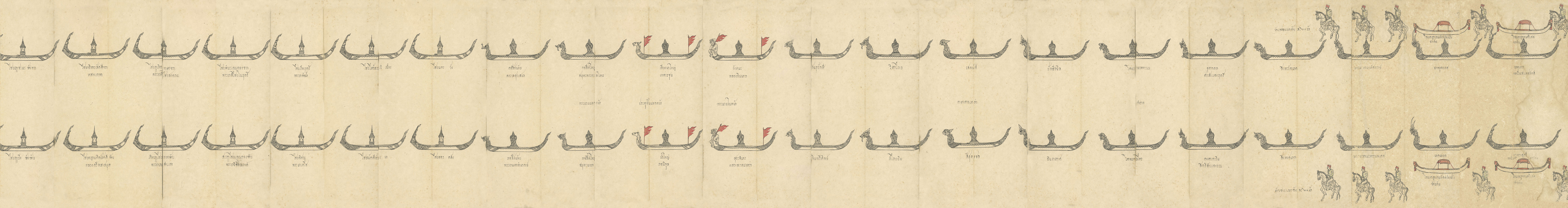
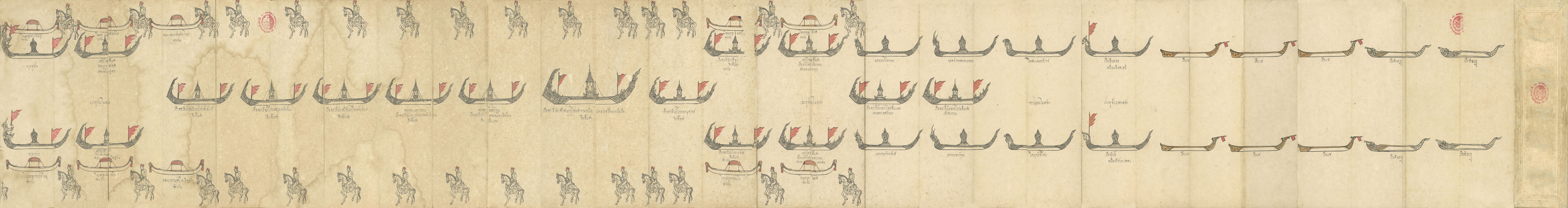
Royal Barge Procession of Ayutthaya Scroll

The Royal Barge Procession of Ayutthaya Scroll was made in 1797 by Chao Phraya Phra Khlang (Nhon) (1782–1805). The royal tradition of traveling in the Royal Barge Procession dates back to the Ayutthaya era. It has continued and been maintained to later eras until the present king's reign. The epic poem "Lilit Phayuhayatra Phetphuang" describes a detailed depiction of royal processions during the Ayutthaya era. It was composed by Chao Phraya Phra Khlang (Nhon) in 1797 under the royal command of King Phutthayotfa Chulalok Maharaj (1737–1809). It is based on memories of events witnessed during the late Ayutthaya period. The descriptions of the royal barges in "Lilit Phayuhayatra Phetphuang" are similar to those mentioned in accounts from the inhabitants of Ayutthaya.

==== Royal funeral ====
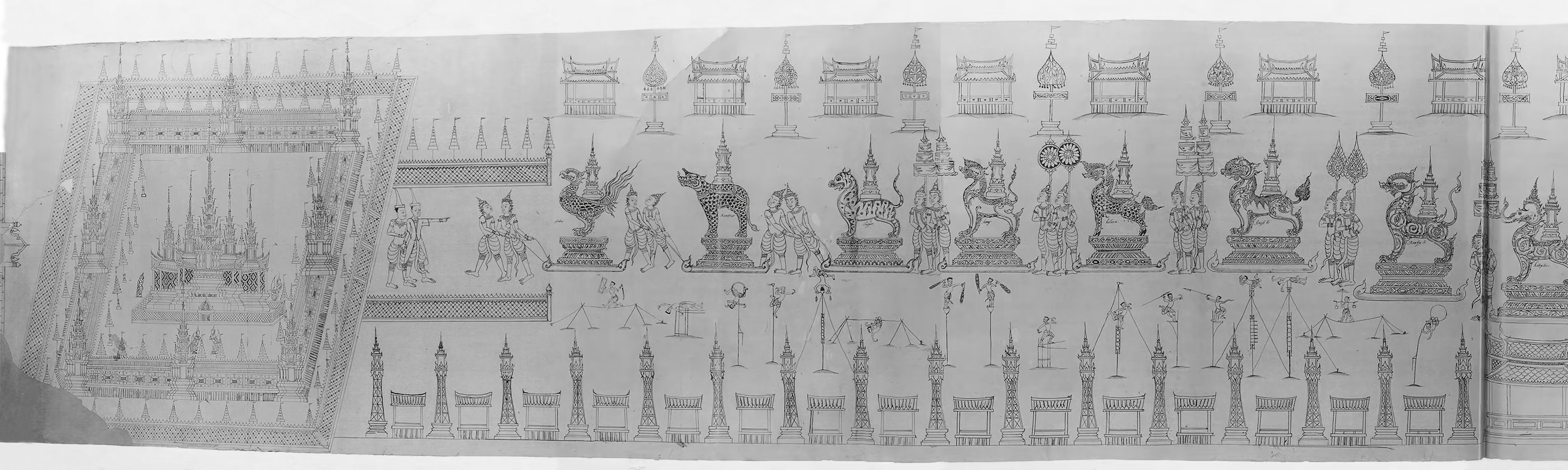
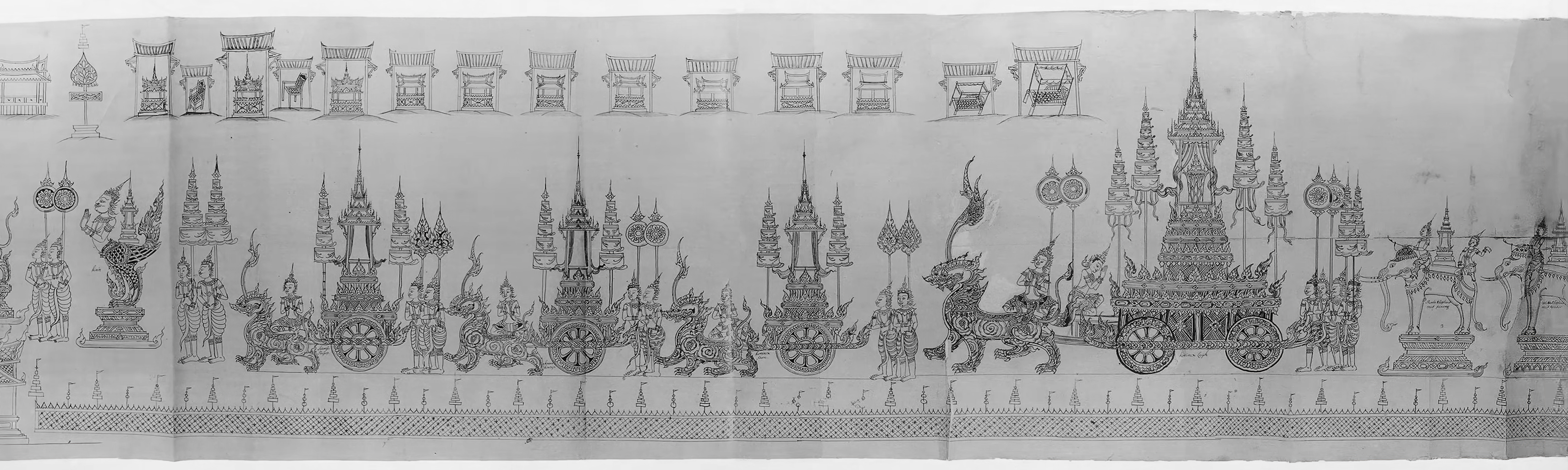
Royal funeral of King Phetracha in 1704 scroll

This scroll depicts the royal funeral procession of King Phetracha. The king died on 5 February 1703 and he was cremated nearly 22 months later on 26 December 1704. This is a typical two-dimensional Thai artwork with black ink and fine lines. It features mythical creatures of Buddhism and the royal urn. The large, ornate wheeled carts (Ratcharot (ราชรถ) are pulled by state officials in Siamese court uniforms. Some officials wear a lomphok. On the utmost left side is a large cremation building for the king called Phra Merumat (พระเมรุมาศ). On the sidelines (top and bottom) are various stalls. Many acrobats perform tricks to entertain the spectators and mourners.

This scroll was purchased in 1716 by Augustus II the Strong (1670–1733), King of Poland. Augustus II received two drawings from Egidius van den Bempden (1667–1737). Bempden was the mayor of Amsterdam and also director of the Dutch East India Company. The container with Bempden's drawings was rediscovered by a curator 300 years later. These drawings are among the few well-preserved Siamese documents of that era.

=== Literature ===
Ayutthaya was a kingdom rich in literary production. Even after the sack of Ayutthaya in 1767, many literary masterpieces in the Thai language survived. However, Ayutthayan literature (as well as Thai literature before the modern era) was dominated by verse composition (i.e., poetry), whereas prose works were reserved to legal matters, records of state affairs and historical chronicles. Thus, there are many works in the nature of epic poetry in the Thai language. The Thai poetical tradition was originally based on indigenous poetical forms such as rai (ร่าย), khlong (โคลง), kap (กาพย์) and klon (กลอน). Some of these poetical forms – notably khlong – have been shared between the speakers of tai languages since ancient time (before the emergence of Siam).

==== Sanskrit influence on the Siamese language ====
Through Buddhist and Hindu influence, a variety of Chanda prosodic meters were received via Ceylon. Since the Thai language is mono-syllabic, a huge number of loan words from Sanskrit and Pali are needed to compose these classical Sanskrit meters. According to B. J. Terwiel, this process occurred with an accelerated pace during the reign of King Borommatrailokkanat (1448–1488) who reformed Siam's model of governance by turning the Siamese polity into an empire under the mandala feudal system. The new system demanded a new imperial language for the noble class. This influence set Thai apart from the other tai languages. It brought in Sanskrit and Pali vocabulary in quantity, and required a writing system that preserved Sanskrit orthography for literary use. By the 15th century, the Thai language had evolved into a distinctive medium along with a nascent literary identity of a new nation. It allowed Siamese poets to compose in different poetical styles and mood, from playful and humorous rimed verses, to romantic and elegant klong and to polished and imperious chan prosodies modified from classical Sanskrit meters. Thai poets experimented with these different prosodic forms, producing innovative "hybrid" poems such as Lilit (ลิลิต, an interleave of khlong and kap or rai verses) or Kap hor Klong (กาพย์ห่อโคลง – khlong poems enveloped by kap verses). The Thai thus developed a keen mind and a keen ear for poetry. To maximize this new literary medium, however, an intensive classical education in Pali was required. This made poetry an exclusive occupation of the noble classes. However, B.J. Terwiel notes, citing a 17th-century text book Jindamanee, that scribes and common Siamese men, too, were encouraged to learn basic Pali and Sanskrit for career advancement.

==== Ramakien ====
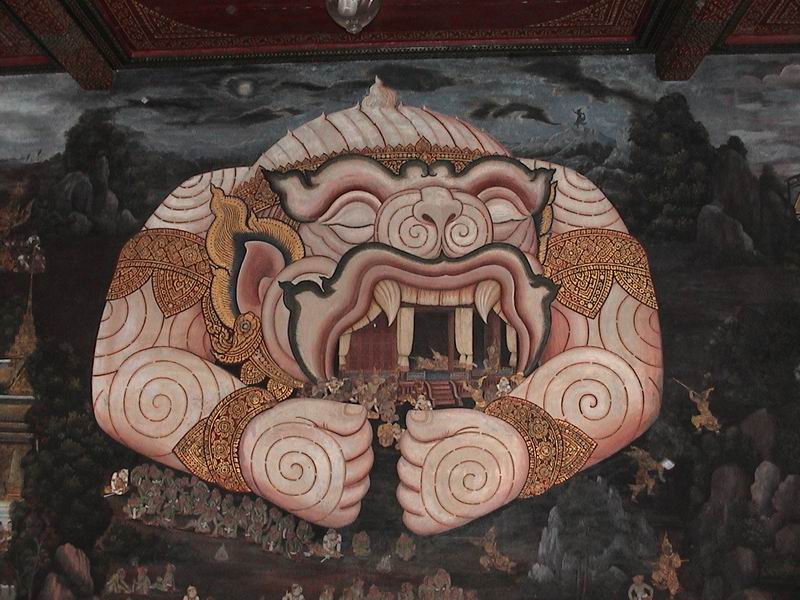
Hanuman protects Rama's pavilion (wall painting, "Room 53" of the gallery in the Wat Phra Kaew).

Most countries in Southeast Asia share an Indianised culture. Traditionally, therefore, Thai literature was heavily influenced by the Indian culture and Buddhist–Hindu ideology since the time it first appeared in the 13th century. Thailand's national epic is a version of the story of Rama-Pandita, as recounted by Gotama Buddha in the Dasharatha Jataka called the Ramakien, translated from Pali and rearranged into Siamese verses. The importance of the Ramayana epic in Thailand is due to the Thai's adoption of the Hindu religio-political ideology of kingship, as embodied by Rama. The Siamese capital, Ayutthaya, was named after the holy city of Ayodhya, the city of Rama. Thai kings of the current dynasty from Rama VI forward, and retroactively, have been referred to as "Rama" to the present day (relations with the west caused the crown to seek a brief name to convey royalty to both Thais and foreigners, following European styles).

A number of versions of the Ramakien epic were lost in the destruction of Ayutthaya in 1767. Three versions currently exist. One of these was prepared under the supervision (and partly written by) King Rama I. His son, Rama II, rewrote some parts for khon drama. The main differences from the original are an extended role for the monkey god Hanuman and the addition of a happy ending. Many of popular poems among the Thai nobles are also based on Indian stories. One of the most famous is Anirut Kham Chan which is based on an ancient Indian story of Prince Anirudha.

==== Khun Chang Khun Phaen: the Siamese epic folk poem ====
Modern performance of sepha oral recitation of Thai poetry

In the Ayutthaya period, folktales also flourished. One of the most famous folktales is the story of Khun Chang Khun Phaen (ขุนช้างขุนแผน), referred to in Thailand simply as "Khun Phaen", which combines the elements of romantic comedy and heroic adventures, ending in high tragedy. The epic of Khun Chang Khun Phaen (KCKP) revolves around Khun Phaen, a Siamese general with superhuman magical powers who served the King of Ayutthaya, and his love-triangle relationship between himself, Khun Chang, and a beautiful Siamese girl named Wan-Thong. The composition of KCKP, much like other orally-transmitted epics, evolved over time. It originated as a recitation or sepha within the Thai oral tradition from around the beginning of the 17th century (c. 1600). Siamese troubadours and minstrels added more subplots and embellished scenes to the original story line as time went on. By the late period of the Ayutthaya Kingdom, it had attained the current shape as a long work of epic poem with the length of about 20,000 lines, spanning 43 samut thai books. The version that exists today was composed with klon meter throughout and is referred to in Thailand as nithan Kham Klon (นิทานคำกลอน) meaning a 'poetic tale'.

=== Architecture ===
The Ayutthaya Buddhist temple falls into one of two broad categories: the stupa-style solid temple and the prang-style (ปรางค์). The prangs can also be found in various forms in Sukhothai, Lopburi, Bangkok (Wat Arun). Sizes may vary, but usually the prangs measure between 15 and 40 meters in height, and resemble a towering corn-cob like structure.

Prangs essentially represent Mount Meru. In Thailand Buddha relics were often housed in a vault in these structures, reflecting the belief that the Buddha is a most significant being, having attained enlightenment and having shown the path to enlightenment to others.

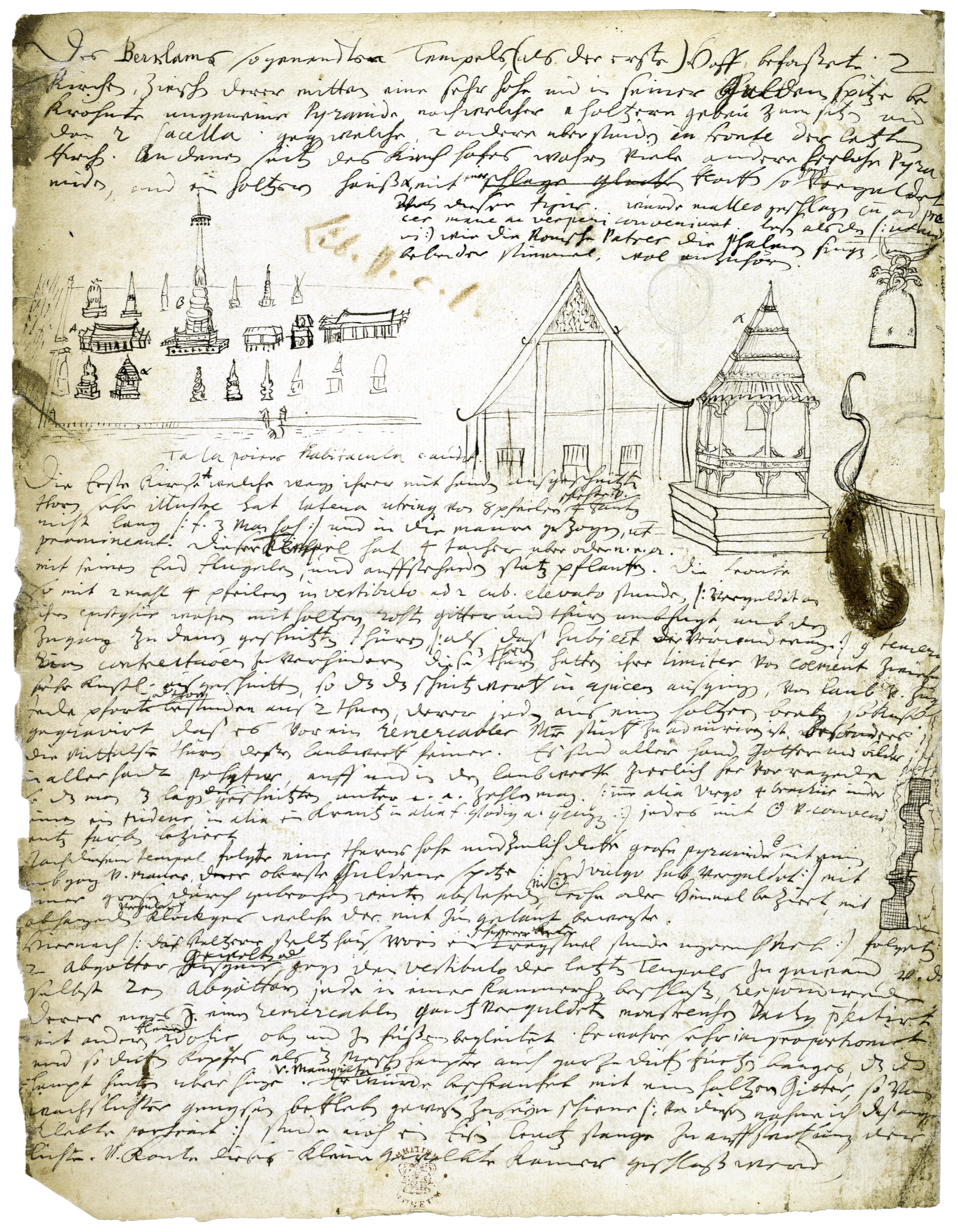
Sketches of Buildings and Phraklang's Temple at Ayutthaya, 1690

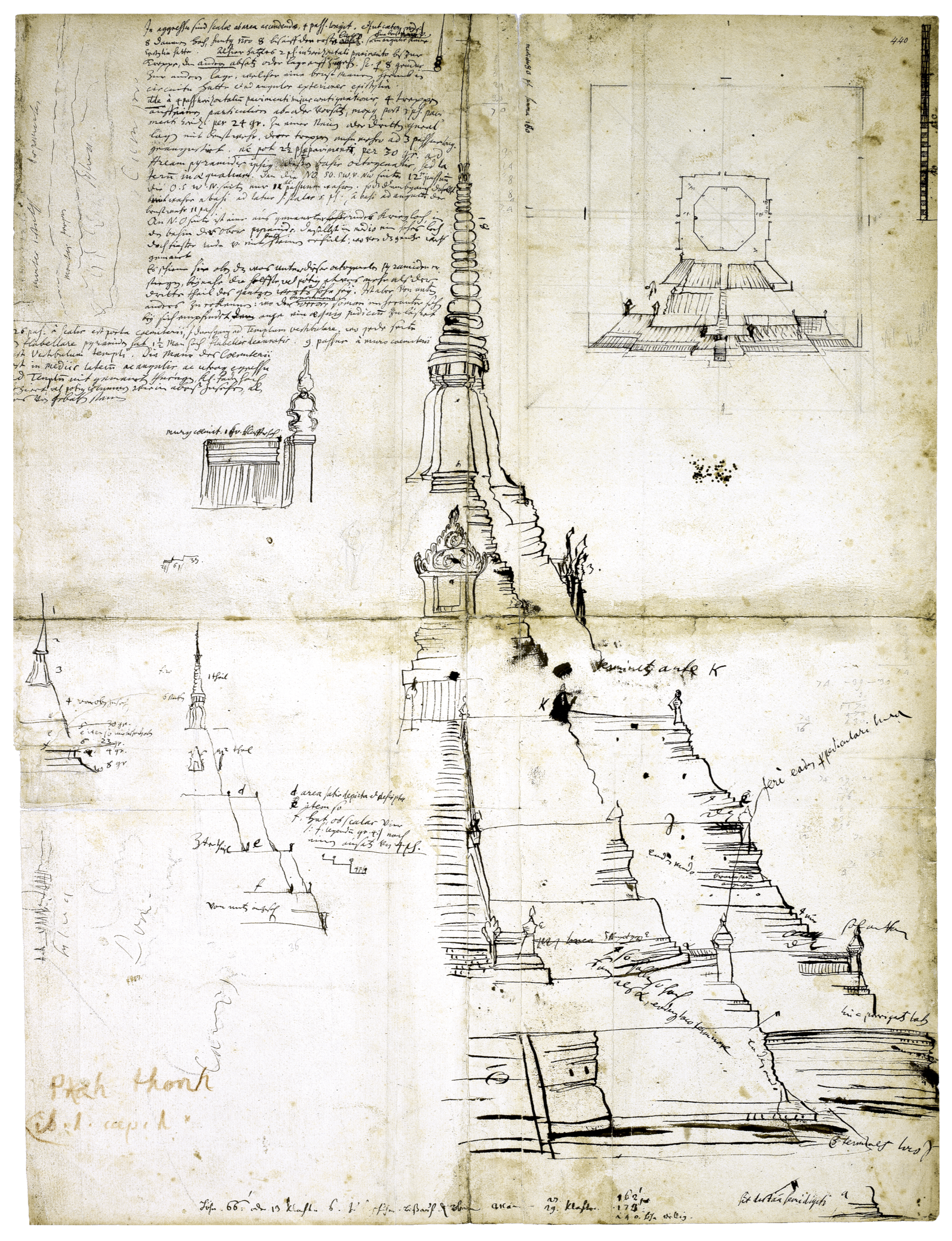
Architectural Details Sketches and Temple Plan, 1690

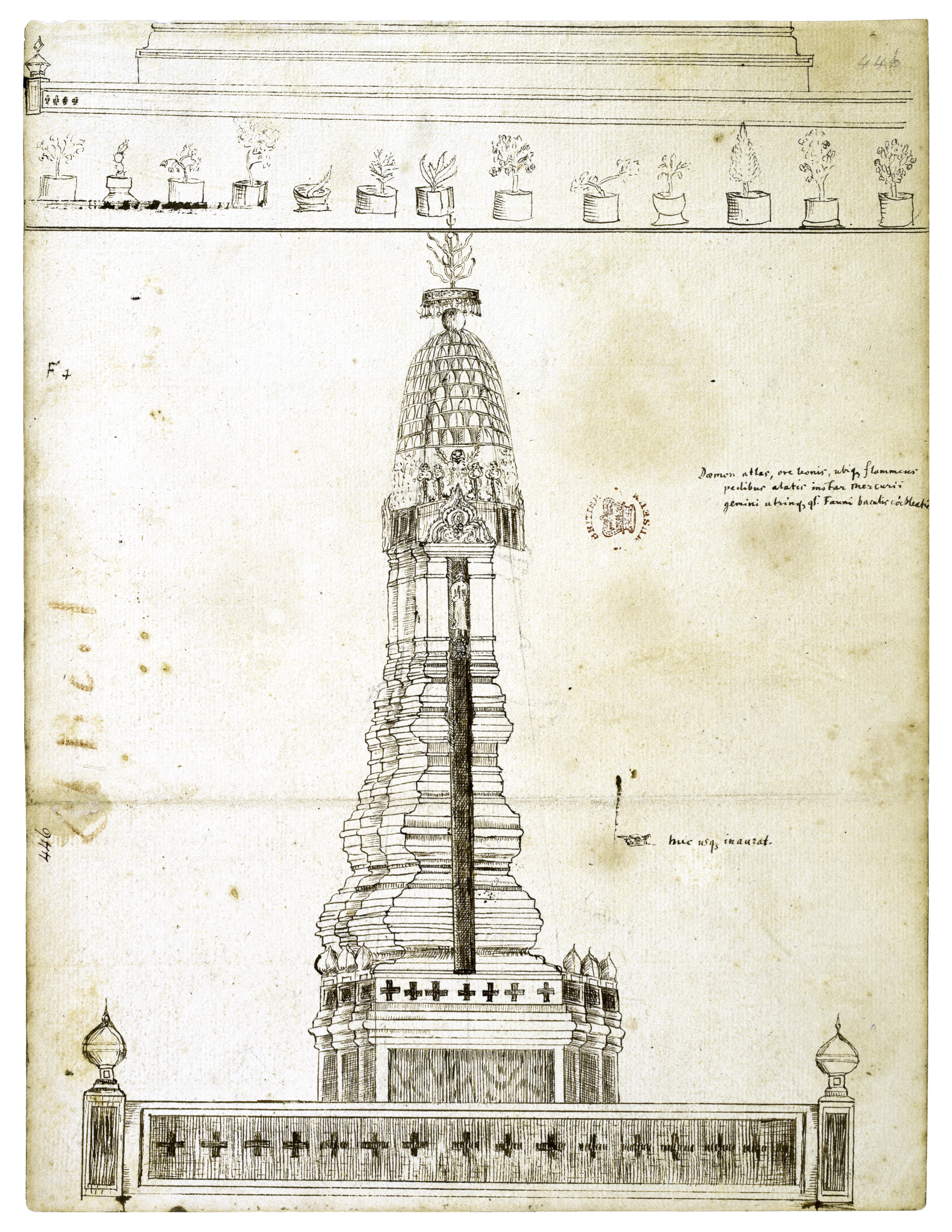
Architectural Details Sketches of Temple, 1690

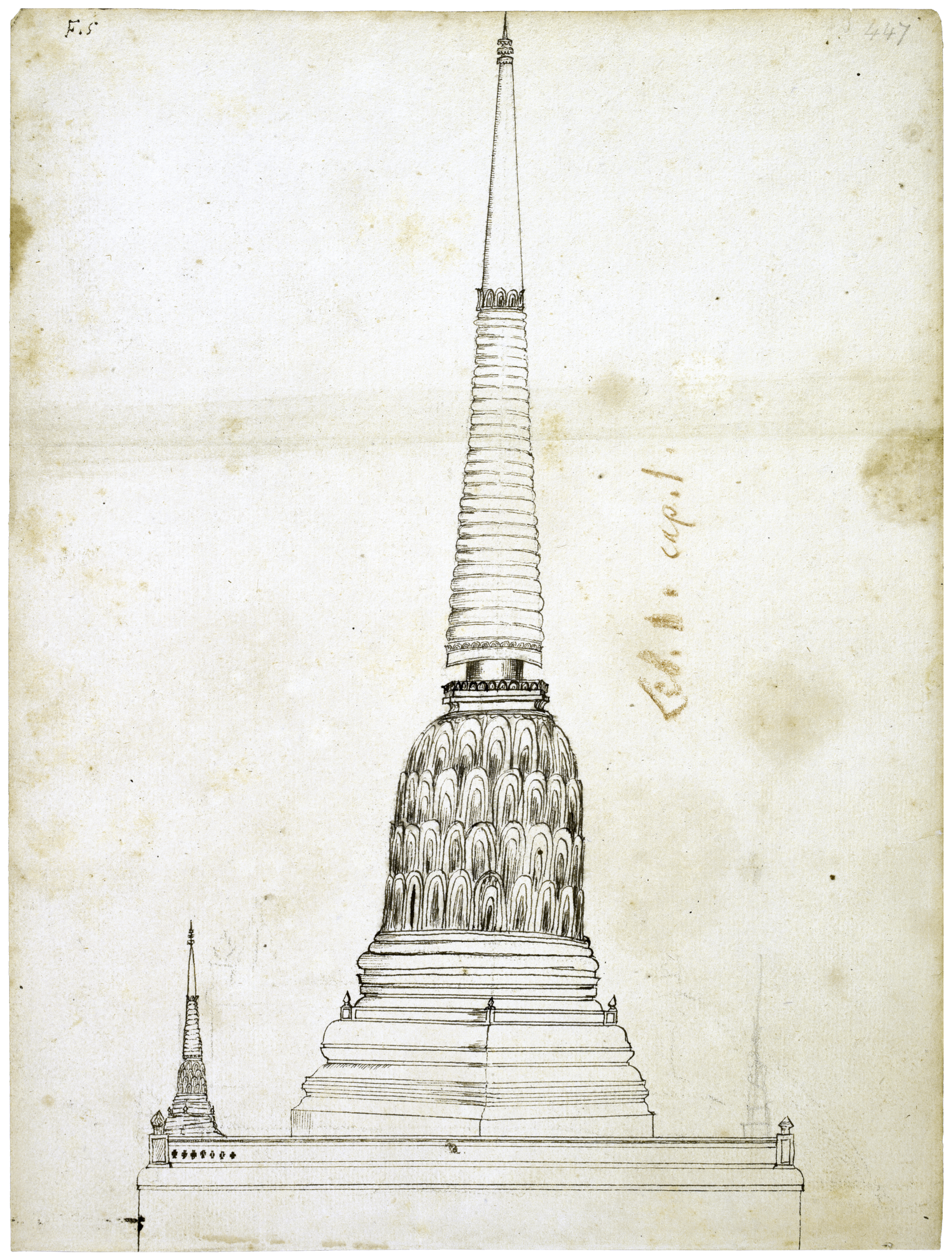
Sketch of Chedi in Phraklang's Temple, 1690

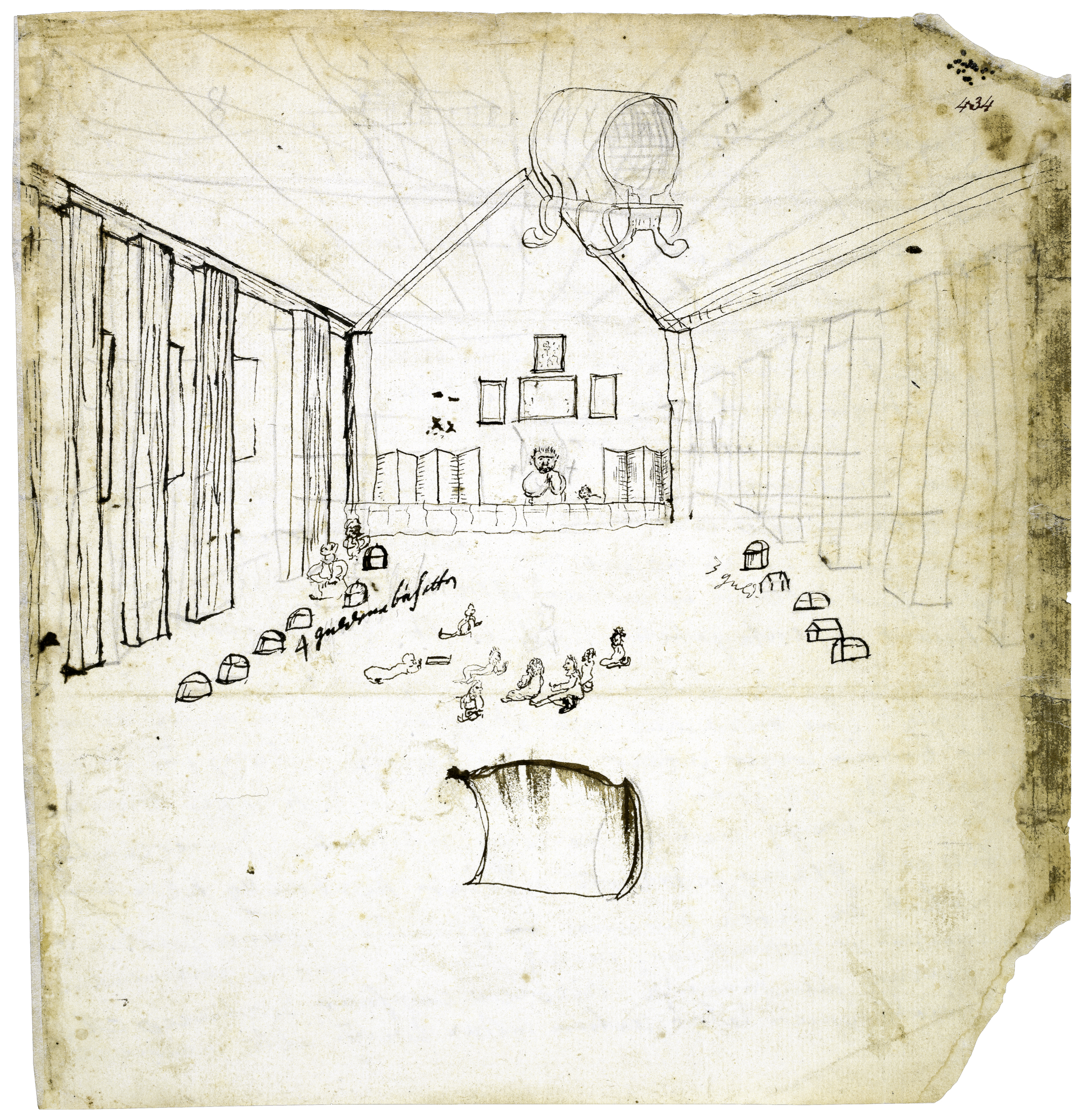
Audience Hall Sketch, 1690

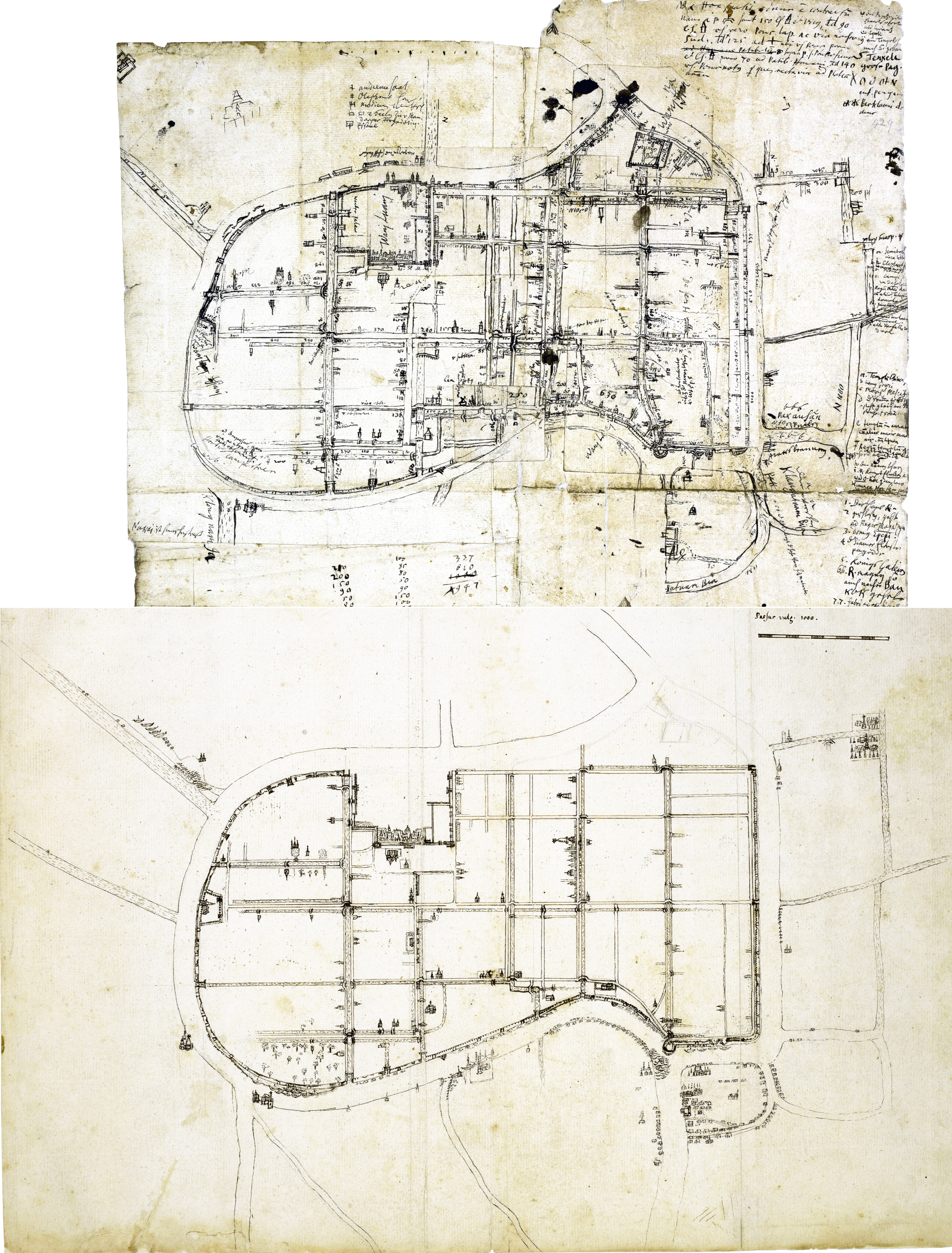
Ayutthaya City sketch and improved map, 1690

German naturalist and explorer Engelbert Kaempfer visited Ayutthaya in June 1690 while en route to Japan. During his stay, he produced detailed maps, sketches, and observations regarding Siamese geography, government, and culture. His records were later published in 1906 in the three-volume work, The History of Japan, together with a Description of the Kingdom of Siam, 1690–92.

=== Notable archeological sites ===
Name	Picture	Built	Sponsor(s)	Notes
Chan Palace, Phitsanulok		Built during the Sukhothai period (1238–1438)	King Li Thai of Sukhothai	Former royal residence of the Front Palaces of Ayutthaya: King Borommatrailokkanat, and King Naresuan. Used as a royal residence from the Sukhothai period until it was abandoned by Naresuan.
Wat Phanan Choeng		1324	King Sai Nam Peung of Ayodhya	Built 27 years before the founding of Ayutthaya; revered temple, still in use
Wat Phutthaisawan		Before 1351	King Uthong	Built before Ayutthaya was founded; birthplace of Thai krabi-krabong sword fighting
Wat Thammikarat		Before 1351		
Wat Phra Si Sanphet		1351	King Uthong	
Wat Yai Chai Mongkhon		1357	King Uthong	
Wat Phra Ram		1369	King Ramesuan	
Wat Mahathat		1374	King Borommarachathirat I	
Wat Ratchaburana		1424	King Borommarachathirat II	
Front Palace, Ayutthaya				Main residence of the Front Palaces of Ayutthaya. Restored by King Mongkut. Currently houses the Chan Kasem National Museum.
Elephant Kraal Pavilion		16th century		Royal elephant kraal formerly used by Ayutthaya monarchs, one of the few still existing in Thailand. Used as an elephant camp today.
Wat Na Phra Men		1503	King Ramathibodi II	One of the best preserved Ayutthaya temples. Survived the Fall of Ayutthaya in 1767. Restored during the reign of Nangklao (r. 1824–51).
Chedi Phukhao Thong		1587 (rebuilt in 1744)	Prince (later King) Naresuan; King Borommakot	Built to commemorate a battle victory following Ayutthaya's liberation from Burma in 1584
Wat Phra Phutthabat, Saraburi		1624	King Songtham	Pilgrimage site in Thailand up to the present.
Wat Chai Watthanaram		1630	King Prasat Thong	
Prasat Nakhon Luang		1631	King Prasat Thong	Mostly reconstructed during the reign of King Chulalongkorn.
King Narai's Palace, Lopburi		1666	King Narai	Palace of King Narai from 1666 until his death in 1688
Wat Kudi Dao		Before 1711	Prince, later King Borommakot	A good example of 18th-century Late Ayutthaya architecture. Partially restored.
Wat Ko Kaew Suttharam, Phetchaburi		1734	King Borommakot	One of the best examples of 18th-century Ayutthaya temple (wat) murals
Wihan Phra Mongkhon Bophit		Heavily renovated during the reign of King Borommakot (r. 1733–1758)	King Borommakot	Heavily damaged by the Burmese sack in 1767, the wihan's current appearance is largely from King Borommakot's major renovations of the temple in the 18th century. Largely reconstructed in the mid-20th century.
Sanphet Prasat Palace		15th century (original). Replica built in 2000s.	King Baromatrai Lokanat	The original Sanphet Prasat palace was in Ayutthaya City. The replica is in Mueang Boran (The Ancient City) Museum in Bangkok.

=== Daily life ===
==== Clothing ====
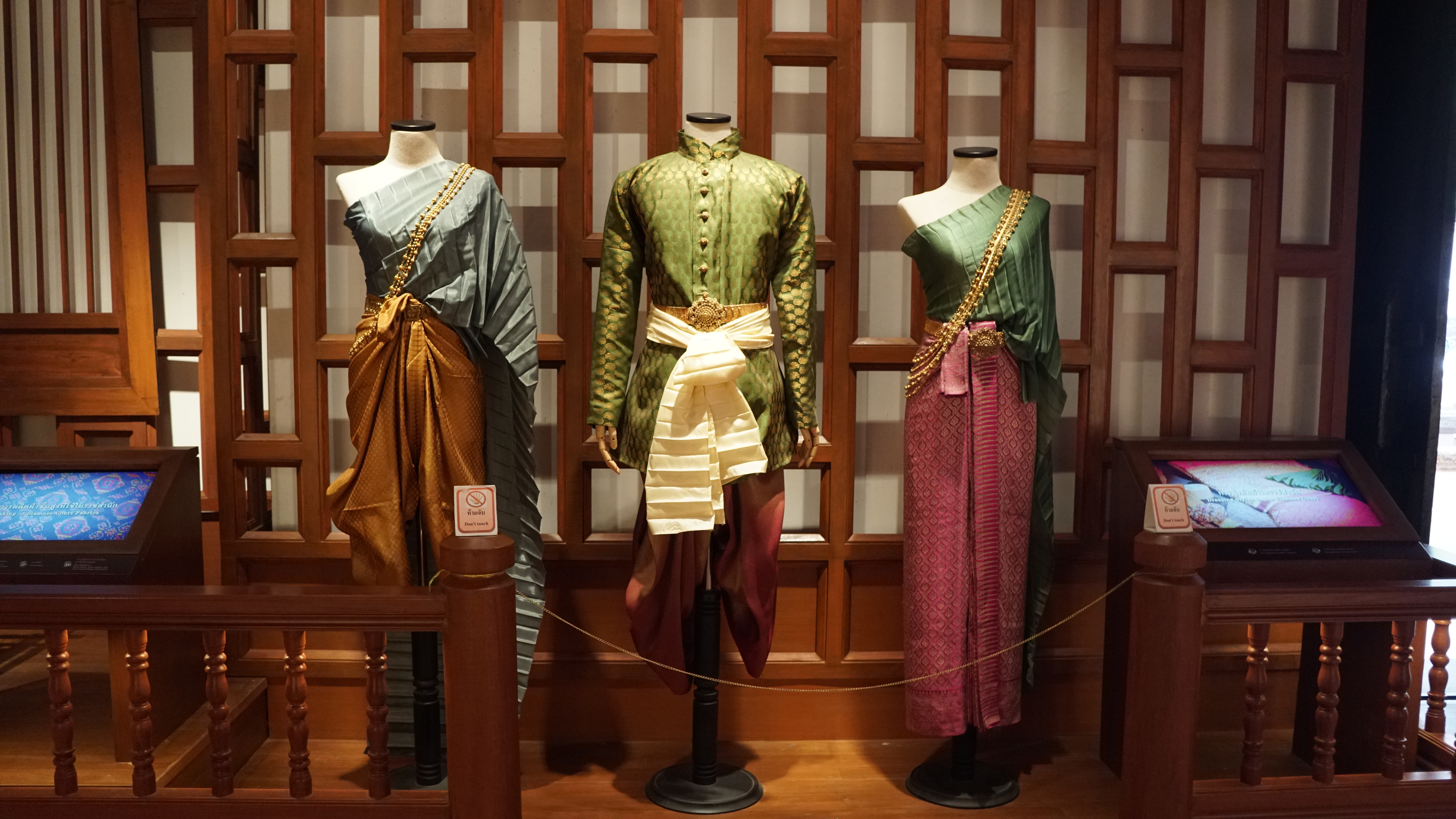
Thai traditional costumes in Bangkok National Museum

Three clothing styles were evident in the Ayutthaya period. Each style depended on social class.

1. Court clothing (worn by the king, queen, concubines, and senior government officials):

- Men: The king wore mongkut (มงกุฎ), as headgear, round Mandarin collar with khrui and wore chong kben (โจงกระเบน), as trousers.
  - Court officers, (who served in the royal palace) wore lomphok, as headgear, khrui, and wore chong kben.
- Women The queen wore chada (ชฎา), as headgear, sabai (สไบ), (a breast cloth that wrap over one shoulder around chest and back) and wore pha nung (ผ้านุ่ง), as a skirt.
  - Concubines wore long hair, sabai, and pha nung.

2. Nobles (rich citizens):

- Men: wore mandarin collar shirt, a mahadthai hair style (ทรงมหาดไทย), and wore chong kben.
- Women: wore the sabai and pha nung.

3. Villagers:

- Men: wore a loincloth, displayed a naked chest, a mahadthai hair style, sometimes wore sarong or chong kben.
- Women: wore the sabai and pha nung.

== Economy ==
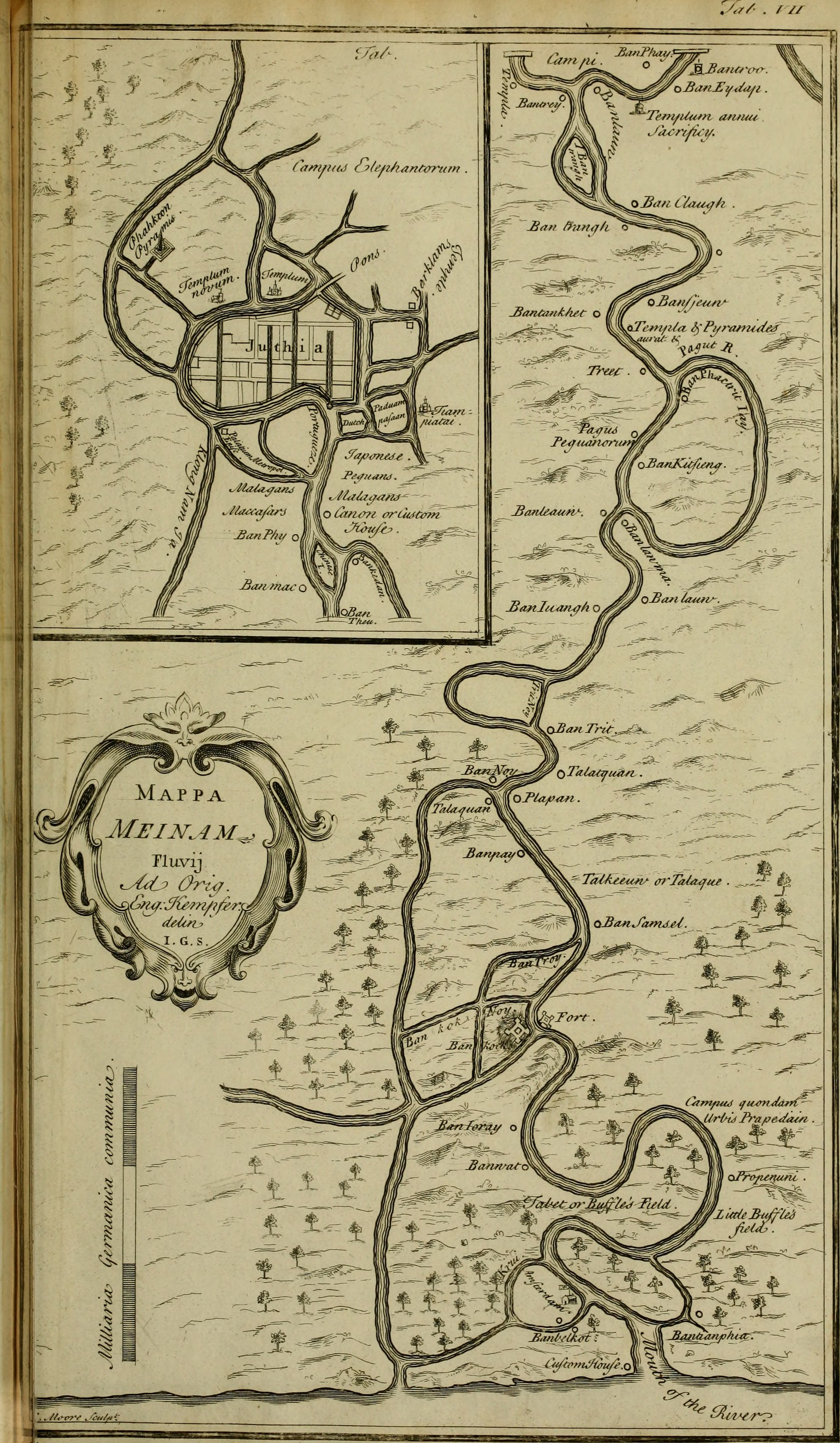
Map of Ayutthaya Chao Phraya River course in the 17th century

The Thais never lacked a rich food supply. Peasants planted rice for their own consumption and to pay taxes. Whatever remained was used to support religious institutions. From the 13th to the 15th centuries, however, a transformation took place in Thai rice cultivation. In the highlands, where rainfall had to be supplemented by a system of irrigation to control water levels in flooded paddies, the Thais sowed the glutinous rice that is still the staple in the geographical regions of the north and northeast. But in the floodplain of the Chao Phraya, farmers turned to a different variety of rice – the so-called floating rice, a slender, non-glutinous grain introduced from Bengal – that would grow fast enough to keep pace with the rise of the water level in the lowland fields.

The new strain grew easily and abundantly, producing a surplus that could be sold cheaply abroad. Ayutthaya, at the southern extremity of the floodplain, thus became the hub of economic activity. Under royal patronage, corvée labour dug canals on which rice was brought from the fields to the king's ships for export to China. In the process, the Chao Phraya delta – mud flats between the sea and firm land hitherto considered unsuitable for habitation – was reclaimed and cultivated. Traditionally the king had a duty to perform a religious ceremony to bless the rice planting.

Although rice was abundant in Ayutthaya, rice exports were banned from time to time when famine occurred because of natural calamity or war. Rice was usually bartered for luxury goods and armaments from Westerners, but rice cultivation was mainly for the domestic market and rice export was evidently unreliable.

=== Trade and currency ===
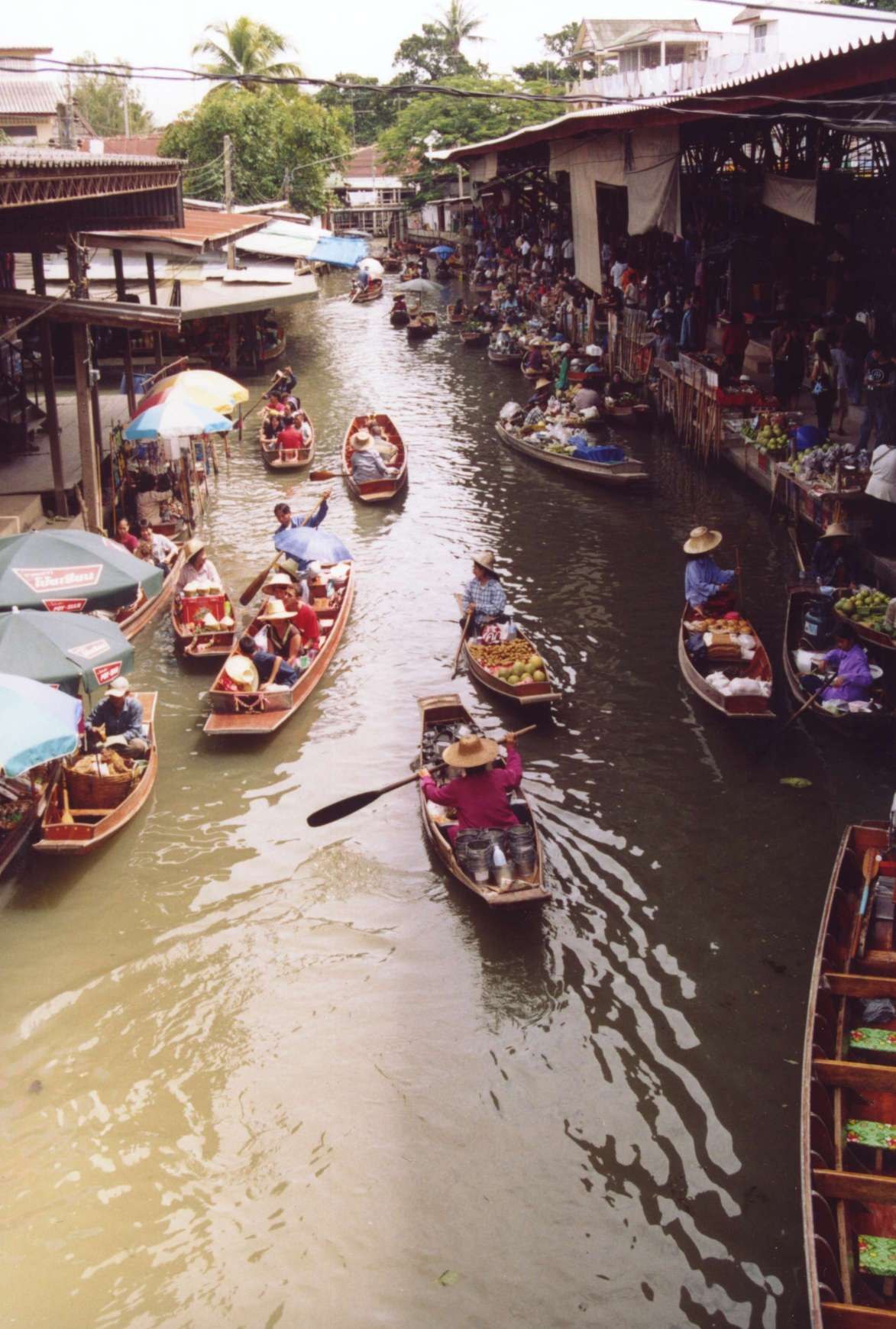
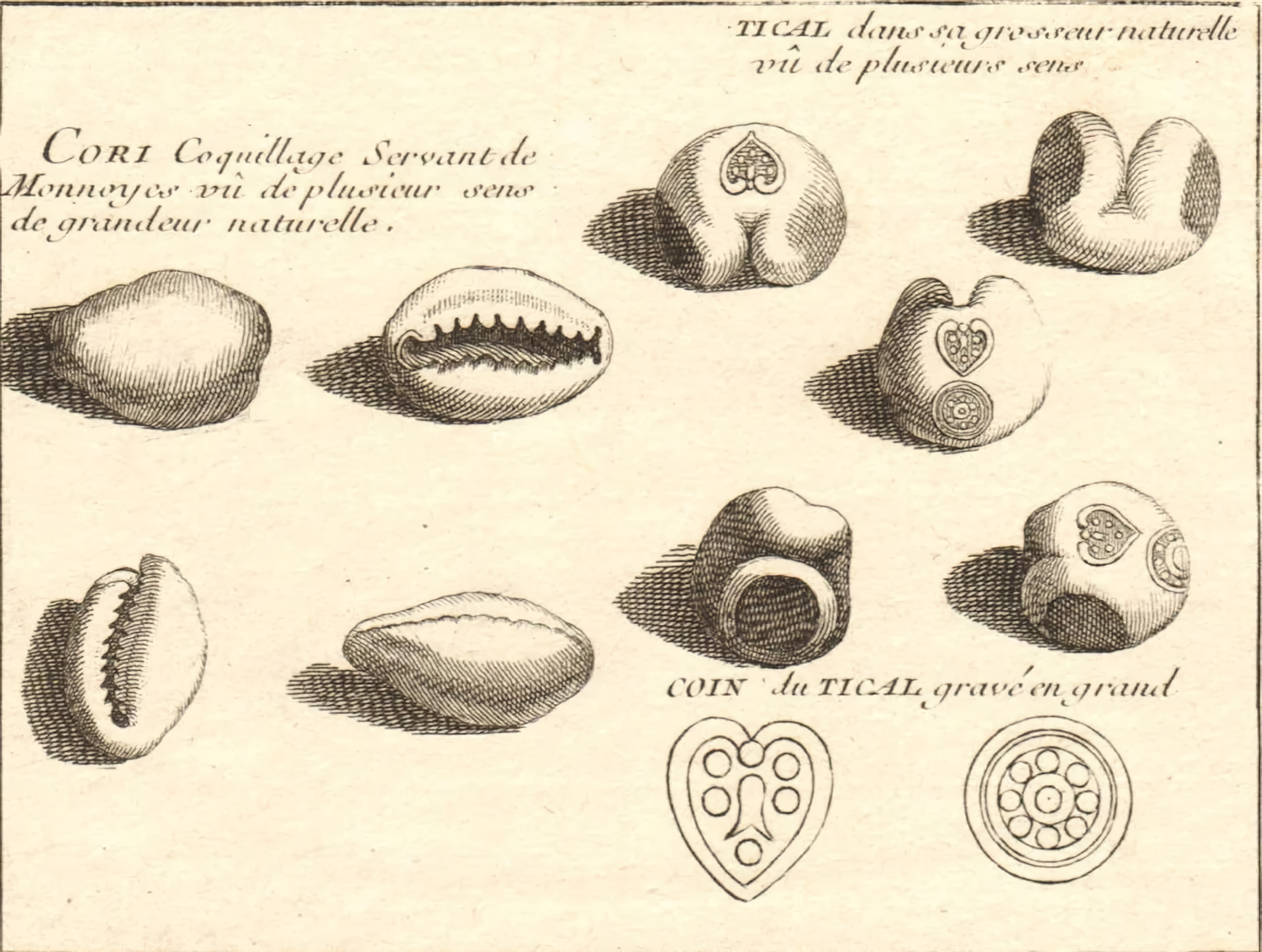
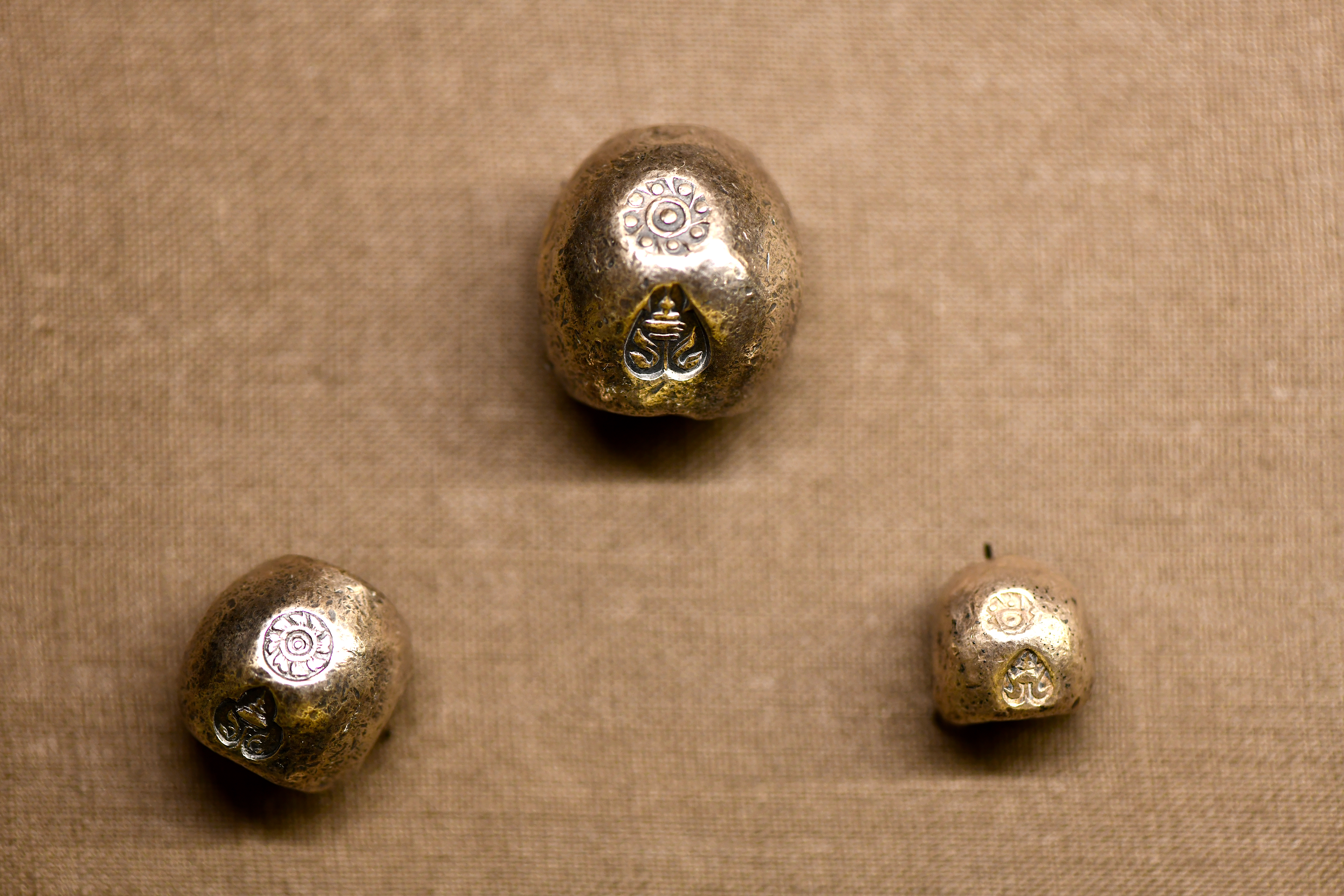
Clockwise: 1. Floating market, a marketplace in Ayutthaya period, where goods are sold from boats. 2. Cowrie and tical phot duang money of Siam 1751. 3. Phot duang coins at Coin Museum Thailand

Ayutthaya officially used cowrie shells, prakab (baked clay coins), and pod duang as currencies. Pod duang became the standard medium of exchange from the early 13th century to the reign of King Chulalongkorn. Foreign trade was run by two departments of the crown, the Krom Tha Sai (กรมท่าซ้าย) and the Krom Tha Khwa (กรมท่าขวา). Reported duty rates differ from one observer to another rather than forming a series. Tomé Pires gives an export duty of about 6.7 per cent in the early 1500s, with Chinese importers paying about 16.7 per cent against 22.2 per cent for others; Peter Floris puts the rate at about 5 per cent each way a century later; and a late compilation gives 3 per cent for friendly states and 5 per cent for the rest, together with a tonnage duty of 6 or 10 baht per metre levied on vessels of at least 8 m in the beam.

The late 17th-century Phanna phumisathan records 61 markets inside the walls, 40 of them open daily and 21 part-time, with four floating markets and about thirty street markets outside, and some twenty thousand rafts moored along the moats and waterways as houses and shops. Carts brought hides, horn and forest produce from Khorat and from Battambang to temporary market huts. Suthipob Chantrapakajee argues that the traffic ran both ways: deer and ray hide went to Japan and armour and sword-hilts came back, ivory and horn went to China and medicines containing them returned, and patterns were sent to India for textiles and to China for bencharong ware made to Siamese design. Copper ingots have been recovered from three wrecks in the gulf, at Rang Kwian, Bang Krachai and Ko Si Chang, each with a datable ceramic cargo; he notes that no evidence shows Ayutthaya smelting copper or iron ingots from domestic ore for export, and that Dutch and Japanese lists treat both as imports.

=== Ayutthaya as international trading port ===
Trade with Europeans was lively in the 17th century. In fact European merchants traded their goods, mainly modern arms such as rifles and cannons, for local products from the inland jungle, such as sappan, woods, deerskin, and rice. Tomé Pires, a Portuguese voyager, mentioned in the 16th century that Ayutthaya, or Odia, was "rich in good merchandise". Most of the foreign merchants coming to Ayutthaya were European and Chinese, and were taxed by the authorities. The kingdom had an abundance of rice, salt, dried fish, arrack, and vegetables.

Trade with foreigners, mainly the Dutch, reached its peak in the 17th century. Ayutthaya became a main destination for merchants from China and Japan. It was apparent that foreigners began taking part in the kingdom's politics. Ayutthaya's kings employed foreign mercenaries who sometimes joined the wars with the kingdom's enemies. However, after the purge of the French in the late 17th century, the major traders with Ayutthaya were the Chinese. The Dutch from the Dutch East Indies Company (Vereenigde Oost-Indische Compagnie or VOC), were still active. Ayutthaya's economy declined rapidly in the 18th century, until the Burmese invasion caused the total collapse of Ayutthaya's economy in 1767.

==== Contacts with the West ====
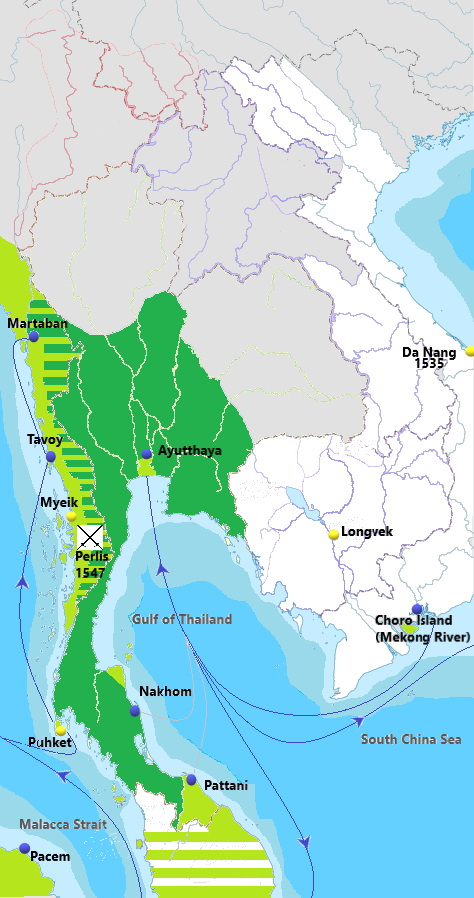
Portuguese in Thailand Gulf 16th and 17th century: Light green – territories conquered or ceded; Dark green (Allied) – Ayutthayan territories; Yellow – Main Portuguese factories

In 1511, immediately after having conquered Malacca, the Portuguese sent a diplomatic mission headed by Duarte Fernandes to the court of King Ramathibodi II of Ayutthaya. Having established amicable relations between the Kingdom of Portugal and the Kingdom of Siam, they returned with a Siamese envoy who carried gifts and letters to the King of Portugal. The Portuguese were the first Europeans to visit the country. Portuguese mercenaries would also play a major role in the invasion of Lanna in 1539 by King Chairachathirat, and Portuguese soldiers would be considered a respected fighting force for the Kingdom across its existence. Five years after that initial contact, Ayutthaya and Portugal concluded a treaty granting the Portuguese permission to trade in the kingdom. A similar treaty in 1592 gave the Dutch a privileged position in the rice trade.

Foreigners were cordially welcomed at the court of Narai (1657–1688), a ruler with a cosmopolitan outlook who was nonetheless wary of outside influence. Important commercial ties were forged with Japan. Dutch and English trading companies were allowed to establish factories, and Thai diplomatic missions were sent to Paris and The Hague. By maintaining these ties, the Thai court skillfully played off the Dutch against the English and the French, avoiding the excessive influence of a single power.

In 1664, however, the Dutch used force to exact a treaty granting them extraterritorial rights as well as freer access to trade. At the urging of his foreign minister, the Greek adventurer Constantine Phaulkon, Narai turned to France for assistance. French engineers constructed fortifications for the Thais and built a new palace at Lopburi for Narai. In addition, French missionaries engaged in education and medicine and brought the first printing press into the country. Louis XIV's personal interest was aroused by reports from missionaries suggesting that Narai might be converted to Christianity.

The French presence encouraged by Phaulkon, however, stirred the resentment and suspicions of the Thai nobles and Buddhist clergy. When word spread that Narai was dying, a general, Phetracha (reigned 1688–1693) staged a coup d'état, the 1688 Siamese revolution, seized the throne, killed the designated heir, a Christian, and had Phaulkon put to death along with a number of missionaries. He then expelled the remaining foreigners. Some studies said that Ayutthaya began a period of alienation from European traders, while welcoming more Chinese merchants. But other recent studies argue that, due to wars and conflicts in Europe in the mid-18th century, European merchants reduced their activities in the East. However, it was apparent that the Dutch East Indies Company or VOC was still doing business in Ayutthaya despite political difficulties.

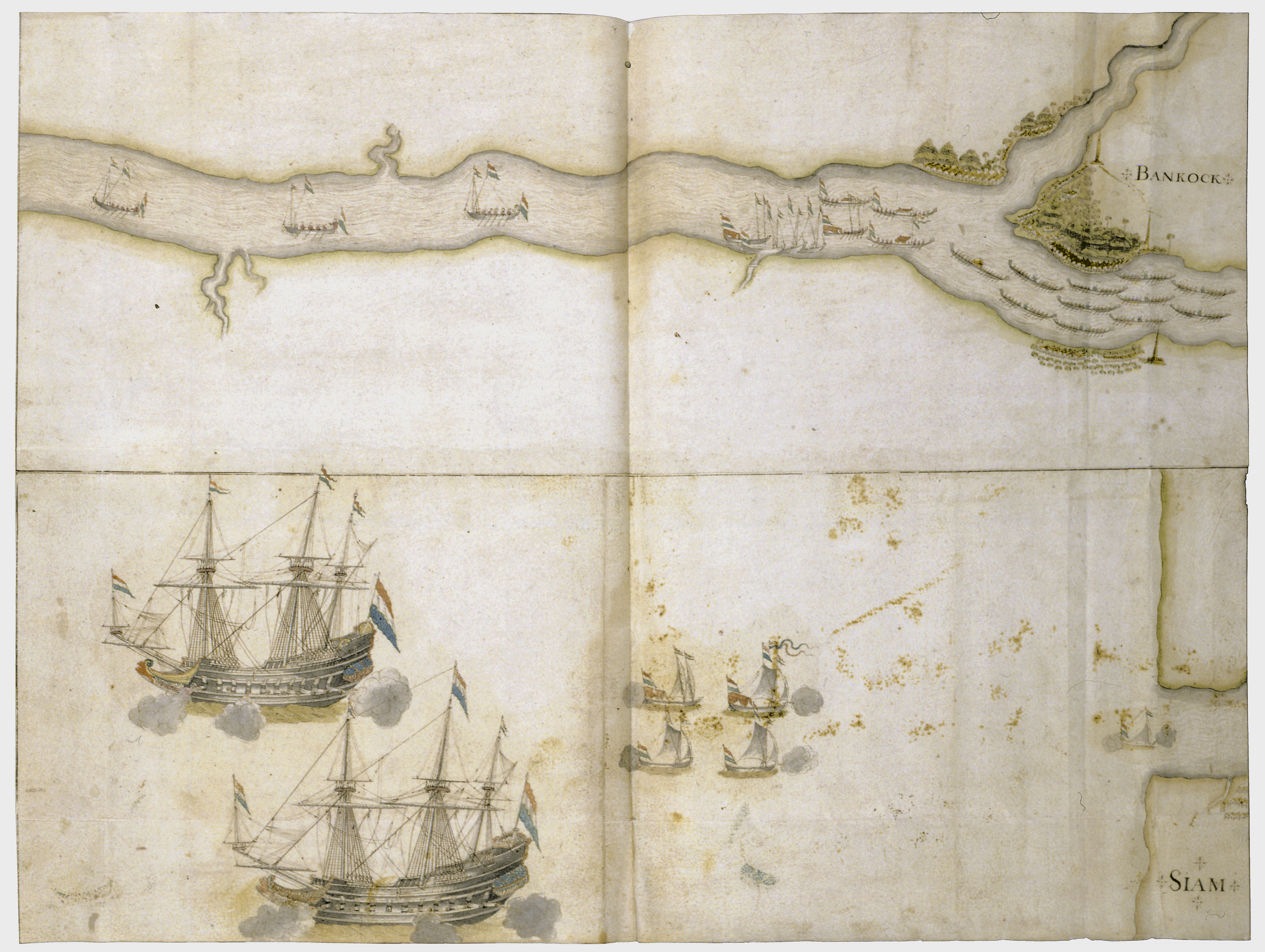
Dutch East India Company merchant ships to Bangkok

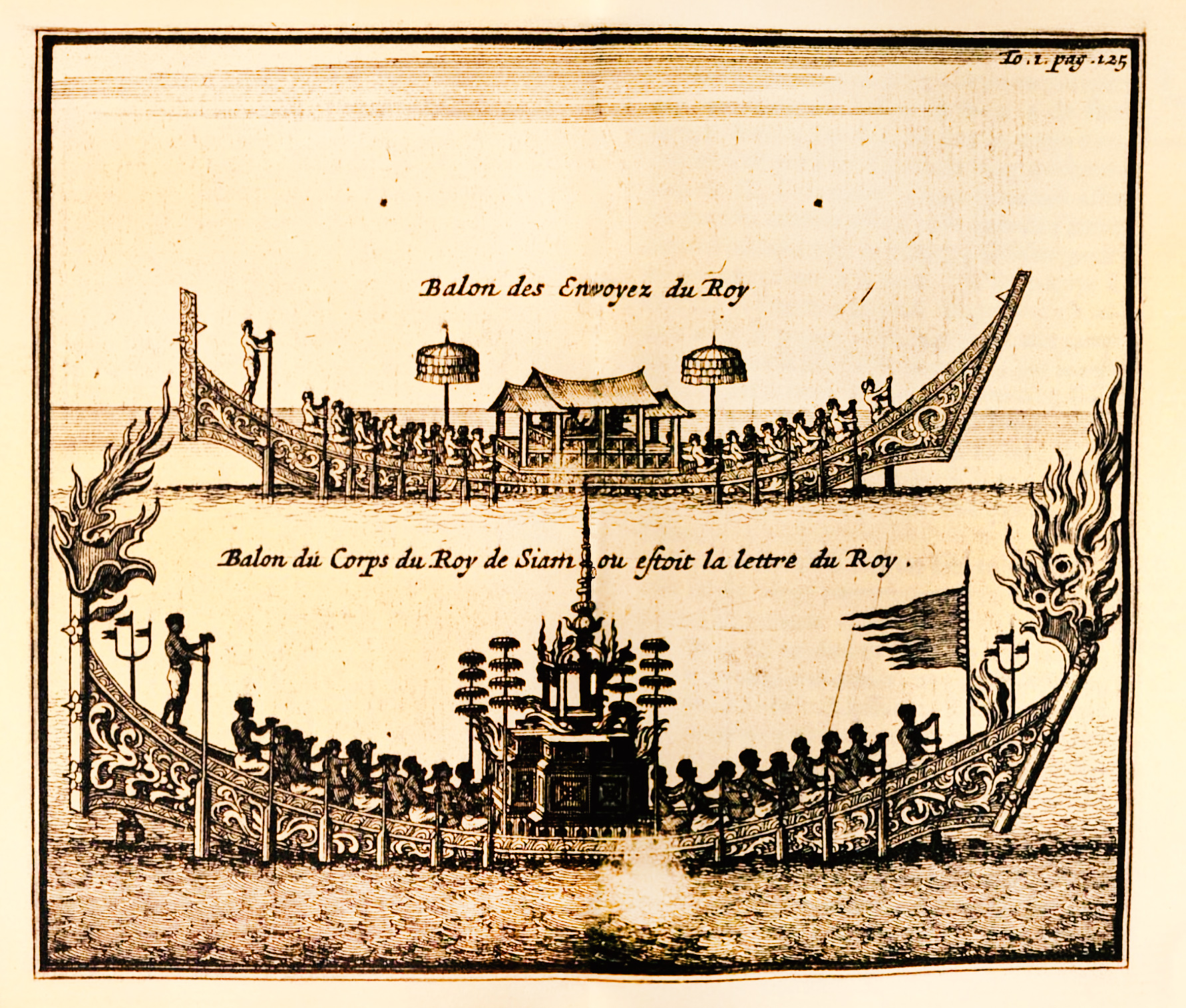
The royal barge of the king of Siam, 1687–1688, drawn by La Loubère, French envoy under Louis XIV

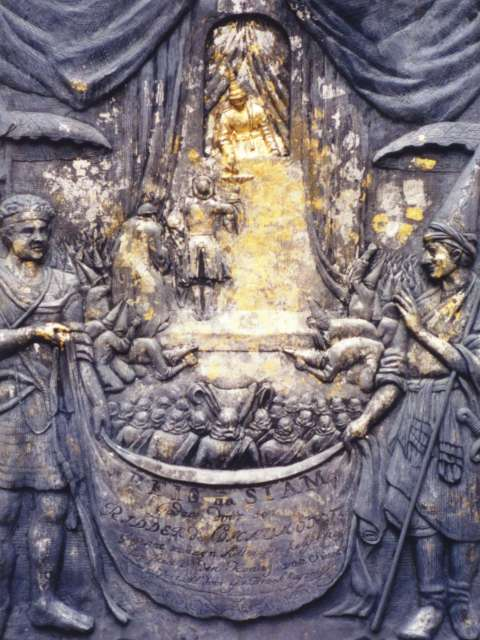
Memorial plate in Lopburi showing King Narai with French ambassadors

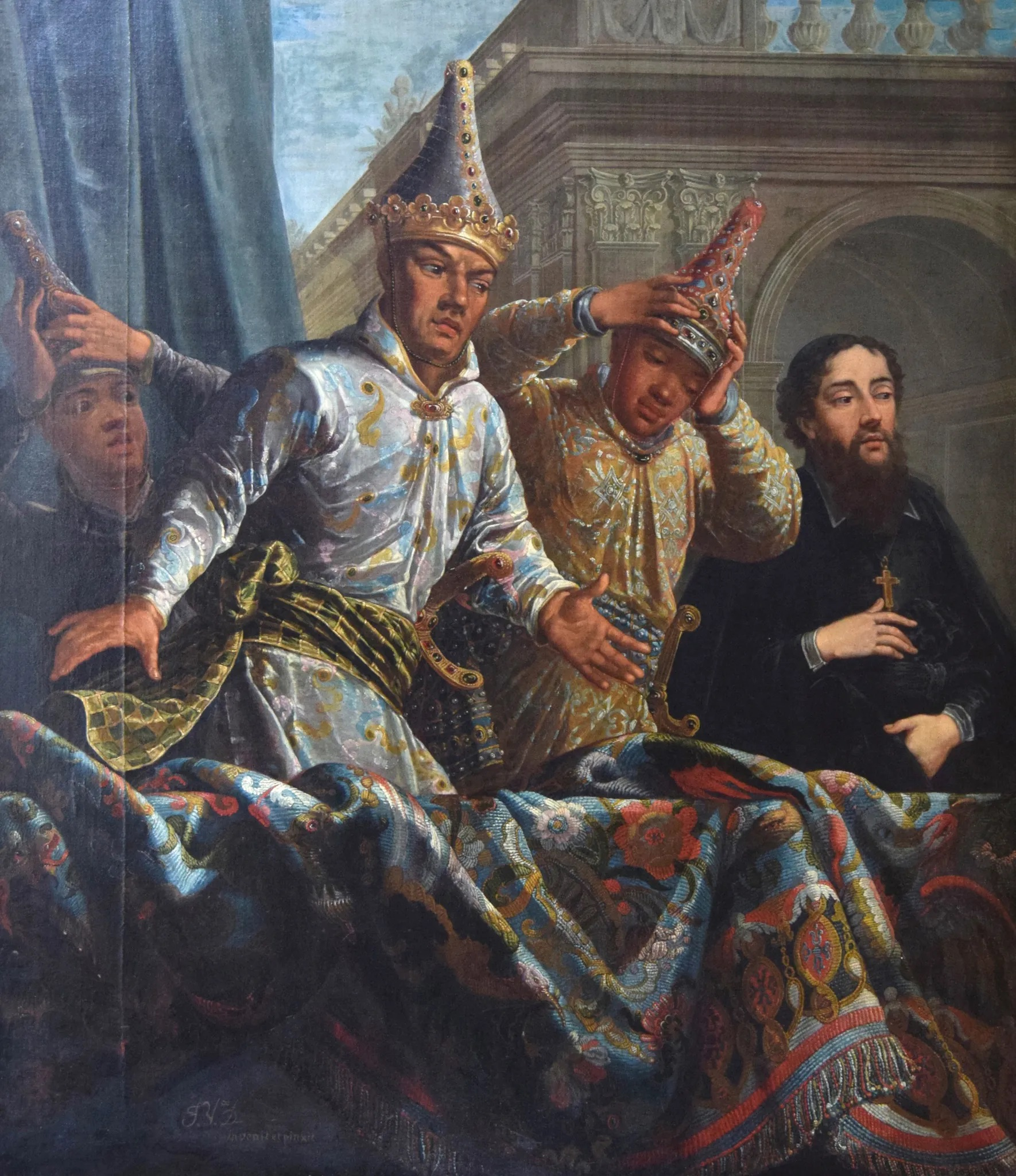
The 1686 Siamese embassy, accompanied by their translator, Abbot Artus de Lionne. Painted by Jacques Vigouroux Duplessis (c. 1680–1732).

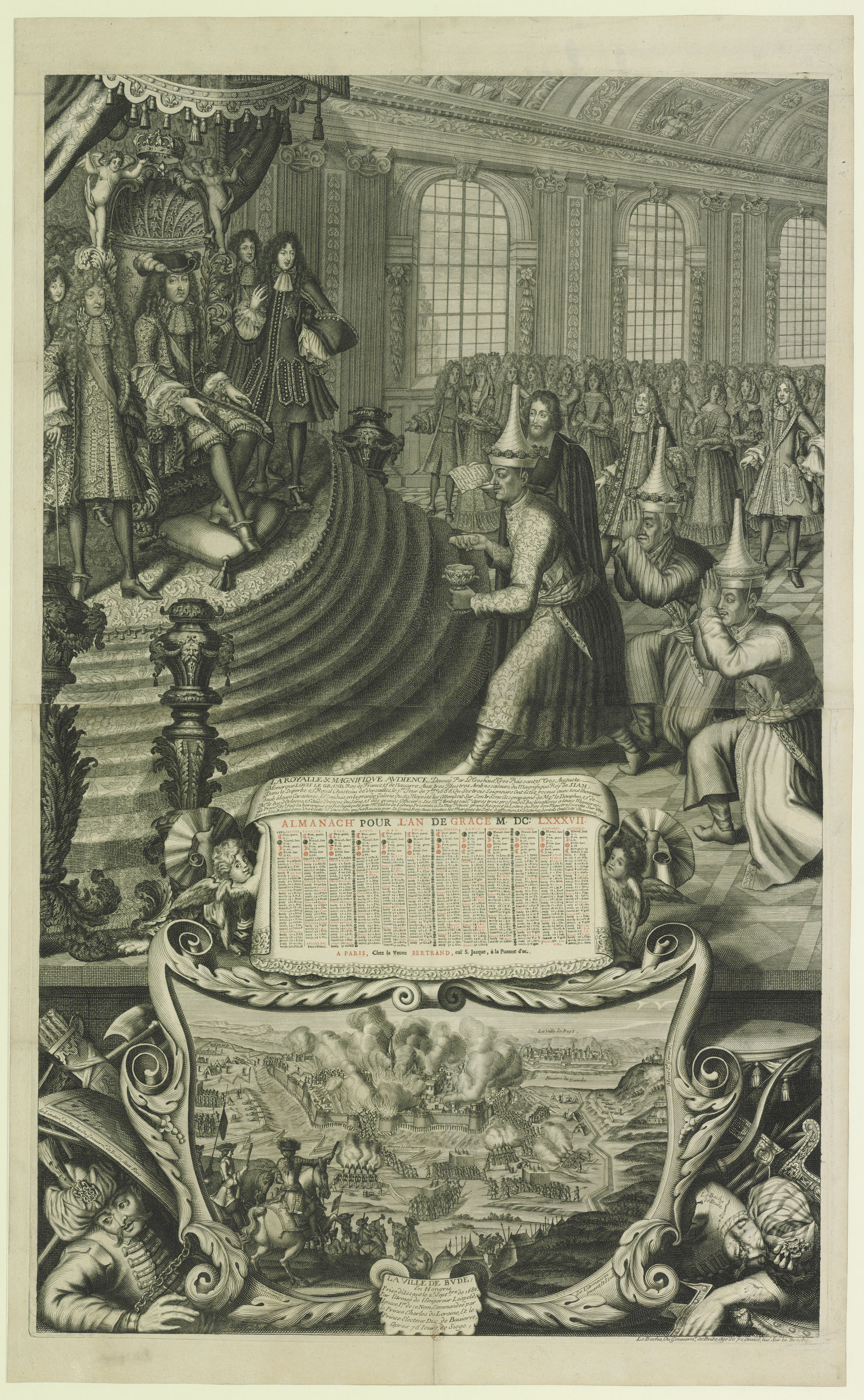
Siamese embassy to Louis XIV in 1686, by Nicolas de Larmessin

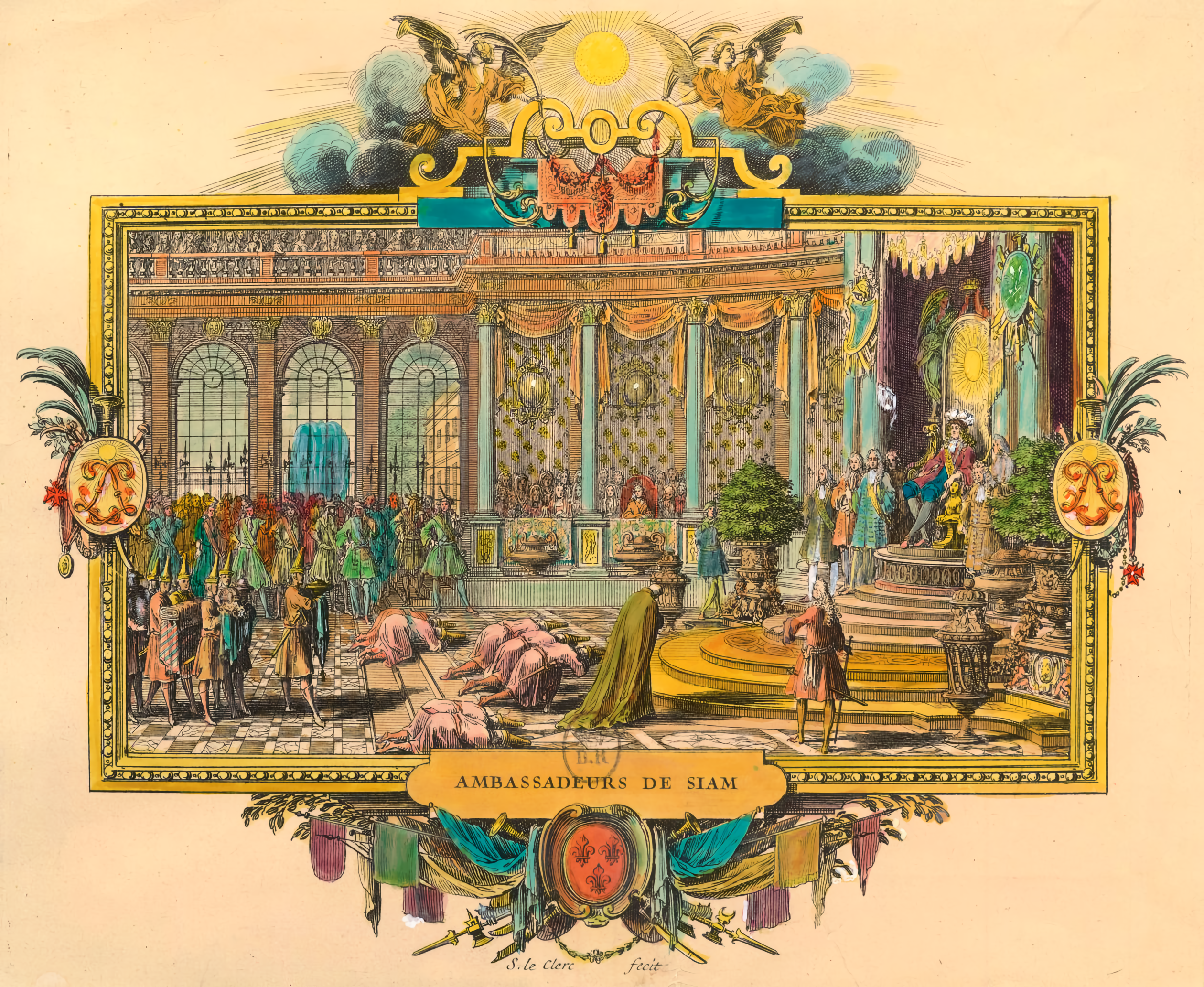
Siamese ambassadors led by Kosa Pan at the court of Louis XIV, Versailles, 1686; engraving by Sébastien Le Clerc

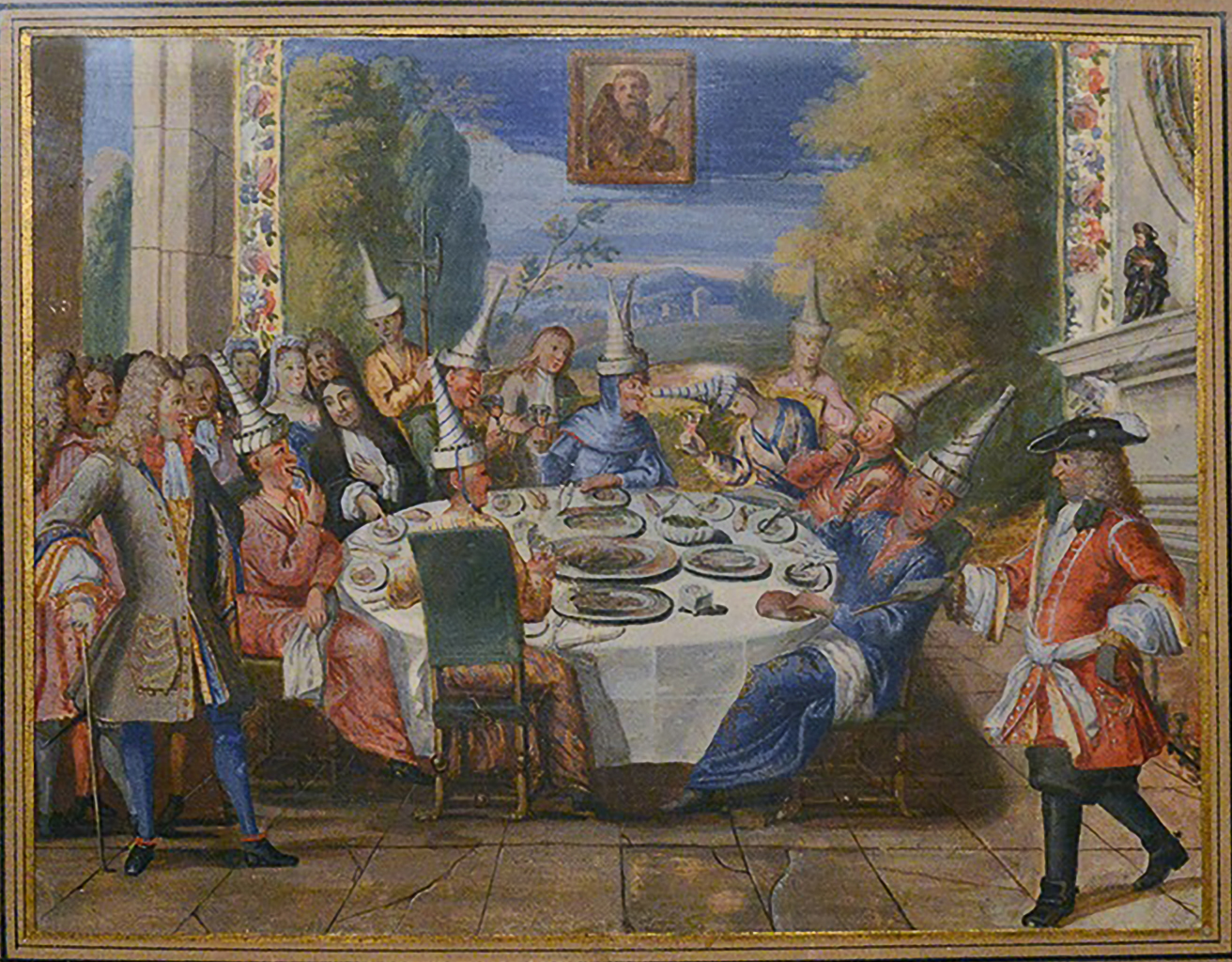
The Siamese embassy received at the Missions étrangères de Paris, December 1686; the diplomats wear Lomphok headgear and Kosa Pan is among them

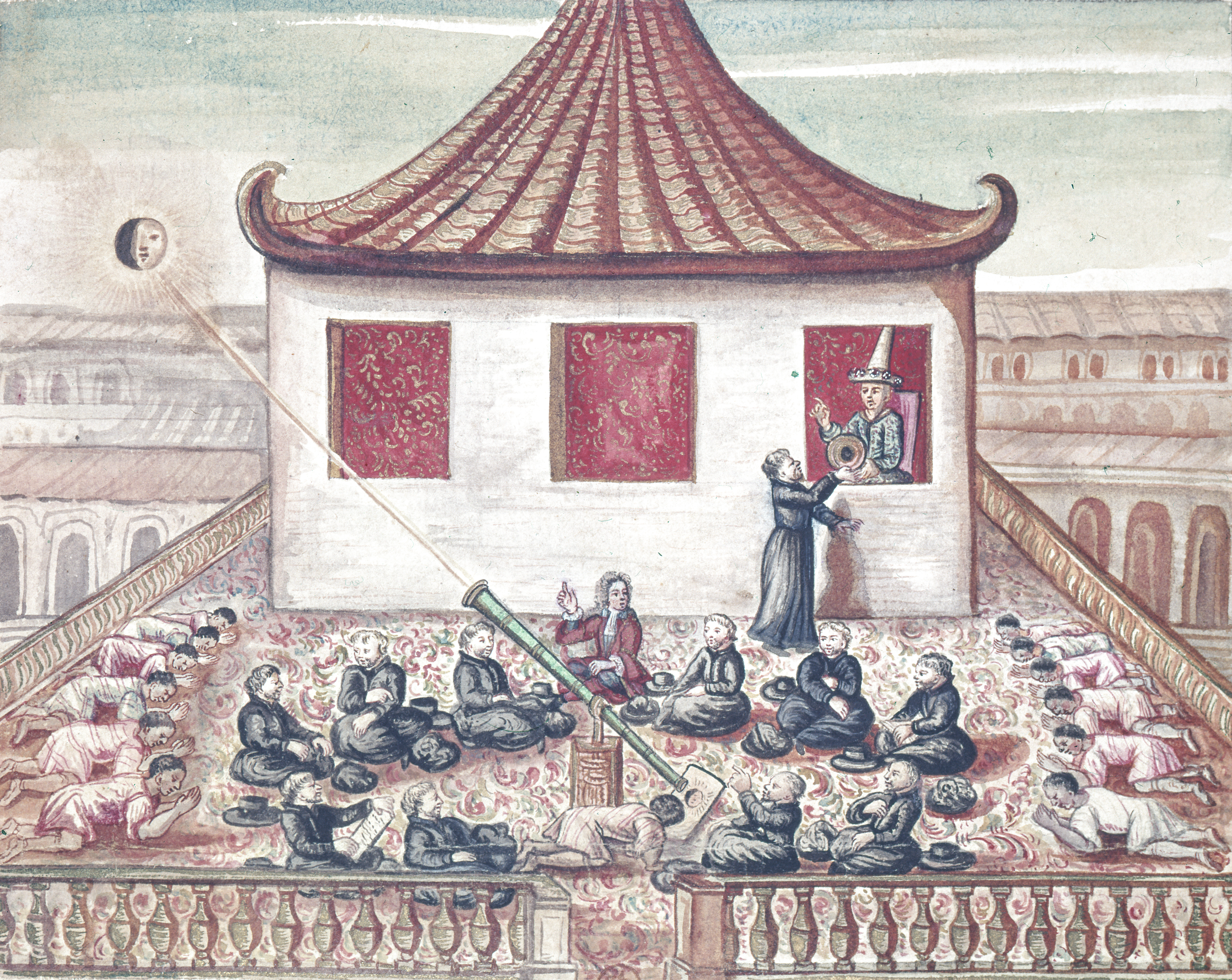
French Jesuits observing an eclipse with King Narai and his court in April 1688, shortly before the Siamese revolution

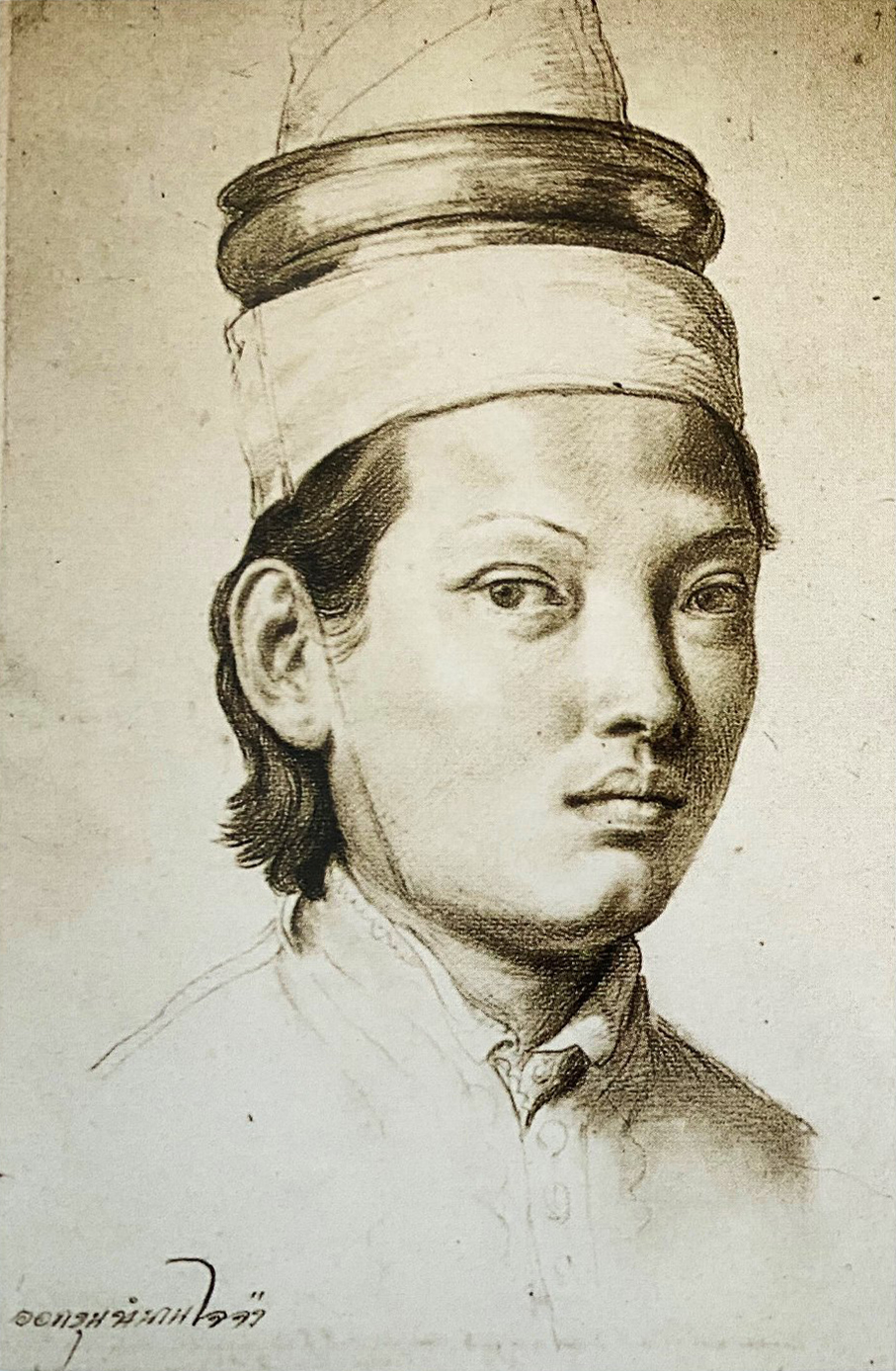
Ok-khun Chamnan, a Siamese ambassador who visited France and Rome on an embassy in 1688

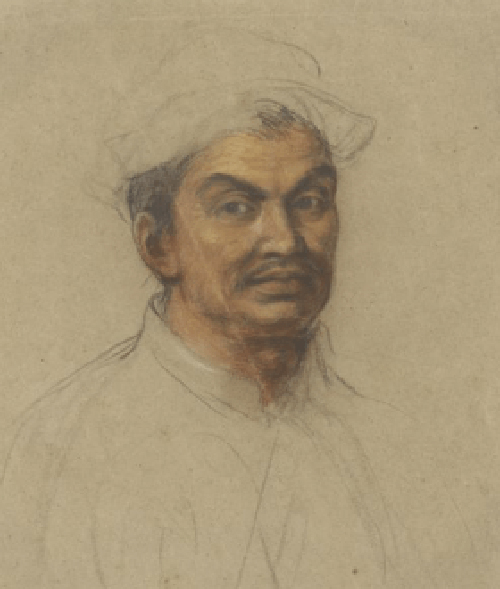
Kosa Pan, Narai's ambassador to the court of Louis XIV, by Charles Le Brun, 1686

==== Contacts with East Asia ====
Between 1405 and 1433, the Chinese Ming sponsored seven naval expeditions. Emperor Yongle aimed to establish a Chinese presence, assert imperial control over trade, and impress foreign peoples in the Indian Ocean basin, and may also have sought to extend the tributary system. The fleet under Admiral Zheng He is believed to have travelled up the Chao Phraya River to Ayutthaya on three occasions.

Meanwhile, a Japanese colony was established in Ayutthaya and became active in trade, particularly exporting deer hides and saphan wood to Japan in exchange for Japanese silver and handicrafts such as swords, lacquerware, and high-quality paper. Japan also imported Chinese silks, deerskin, and ray or shark skins from Ayutthaya, the latter used to make shagreen for sword handles and scabbards.

The Japanese quarters of Ayutthaya housed about 1,500 Japanese inhabitants, with some estimates reaching 7,000. Known in Thai as Ban Yipun, the community was headed by a Japanese chief appointed by Thai authorities. It comprised traders, Christian converts (Kirishitan) fleeing the persecutions of Toyotomi Hideyoshi and Tokugawa Ieyasu, and unemployed former samurai who had fought for the losing side at the battle of Sekigahara.

Padre António Francisco Cardim reported administering the sacrament to about 400 Japanese Christians in Ayutthaya in 1627 ("a 400 japoes christaos"). Japanese communities also existed in Ligor and Patani.

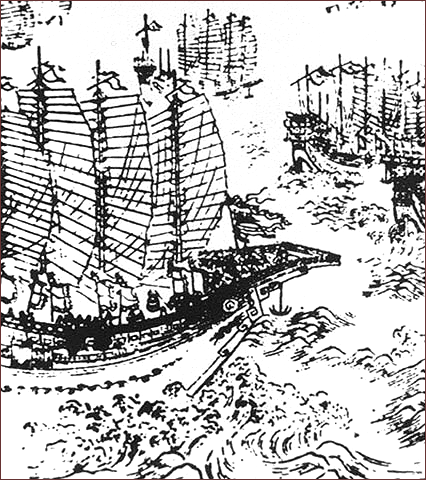
Early 17th-century Chinese woodblock print, thought to represent Zheng He's ships

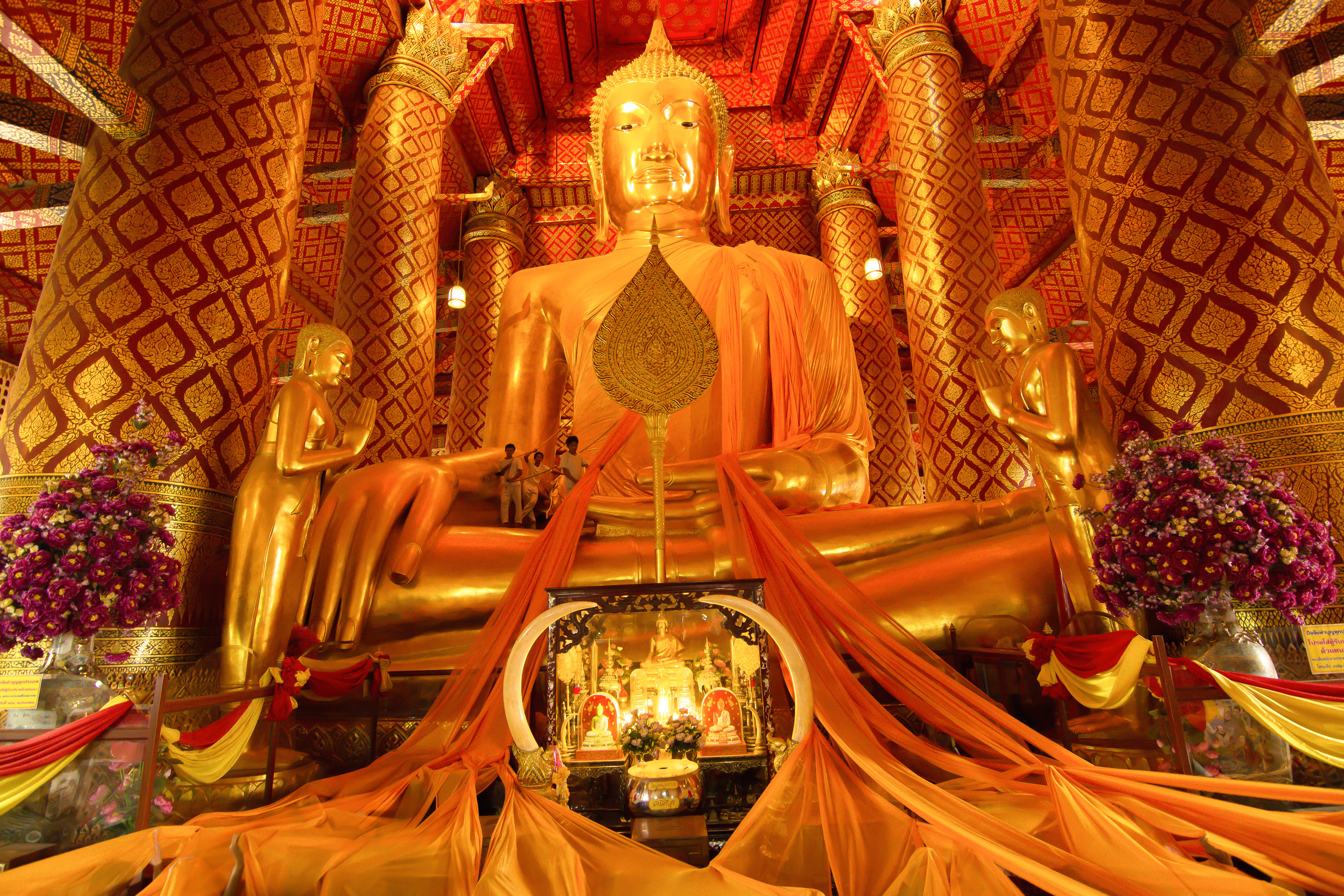
Luang Pho Tho or Sam Pao Kong, the highly revered Buddha statue in Wat Phanan Choeng temple, was visited in 1407 by Zheng He during the naval expedition.

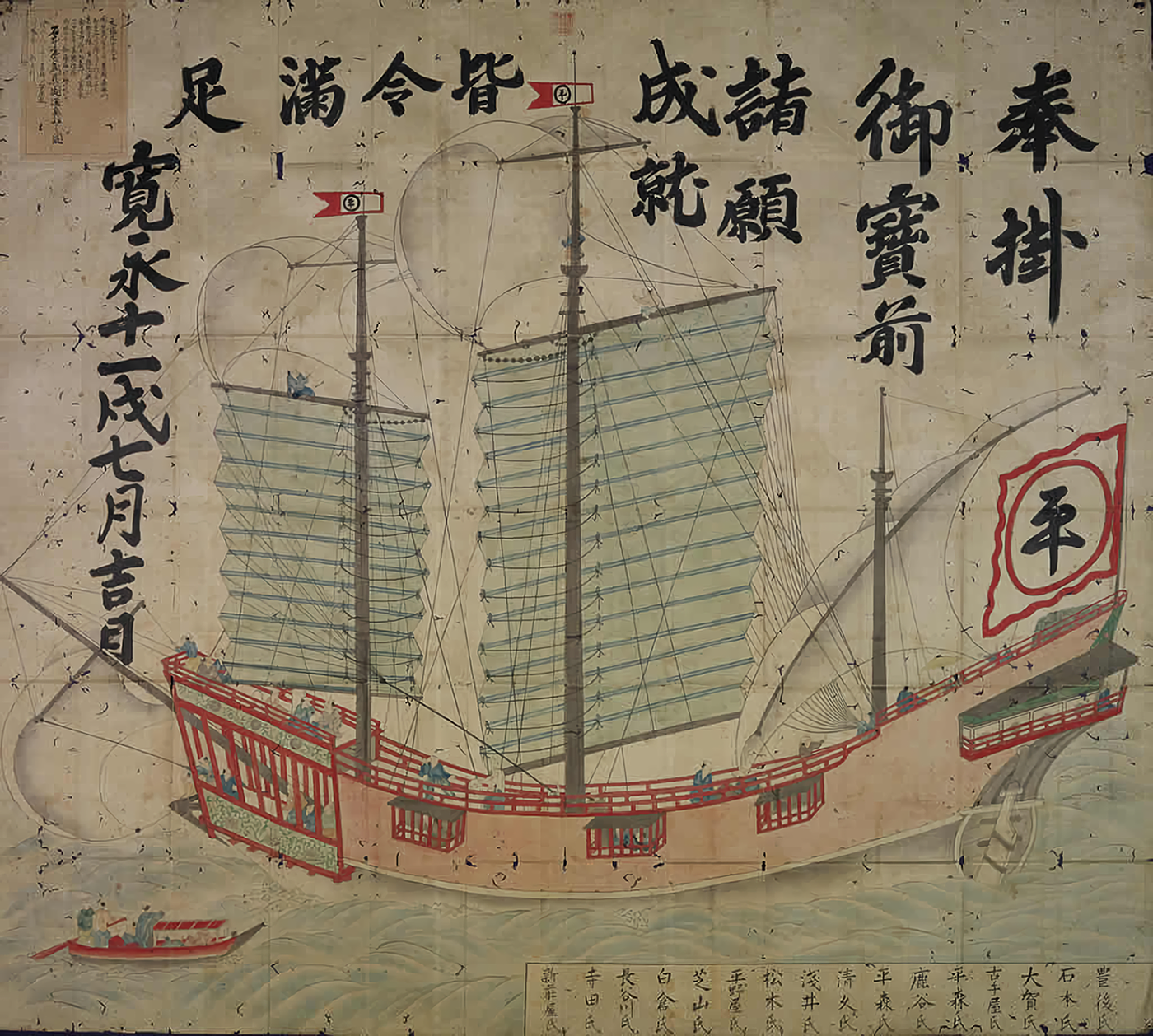
A 1634 Japanese Red seal ship. Tokyo Naval Science Museum.

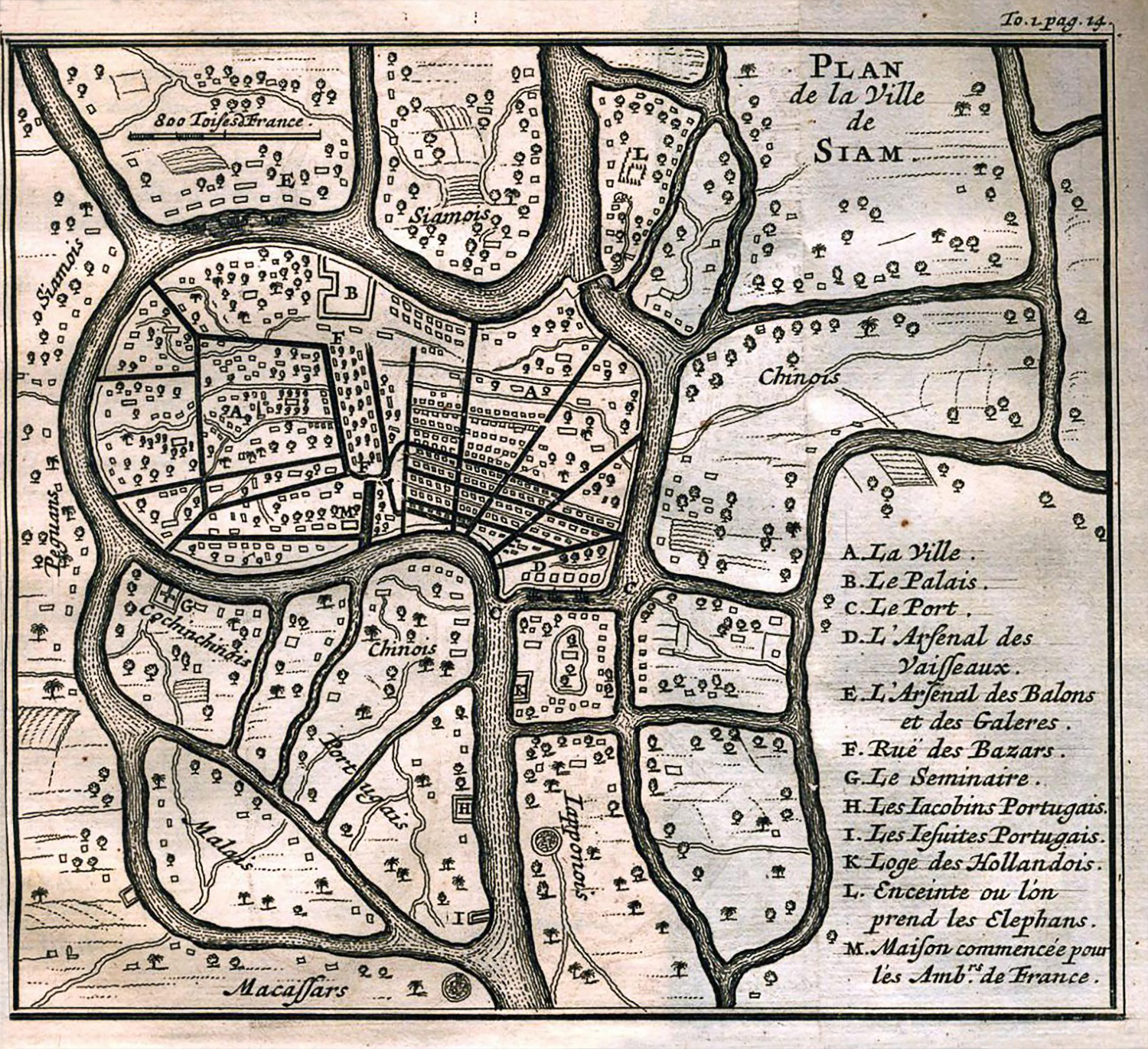
The Japanese quarter in Ayutthaya is indicated at the bottom center ("Japonois") of the map, 1691.

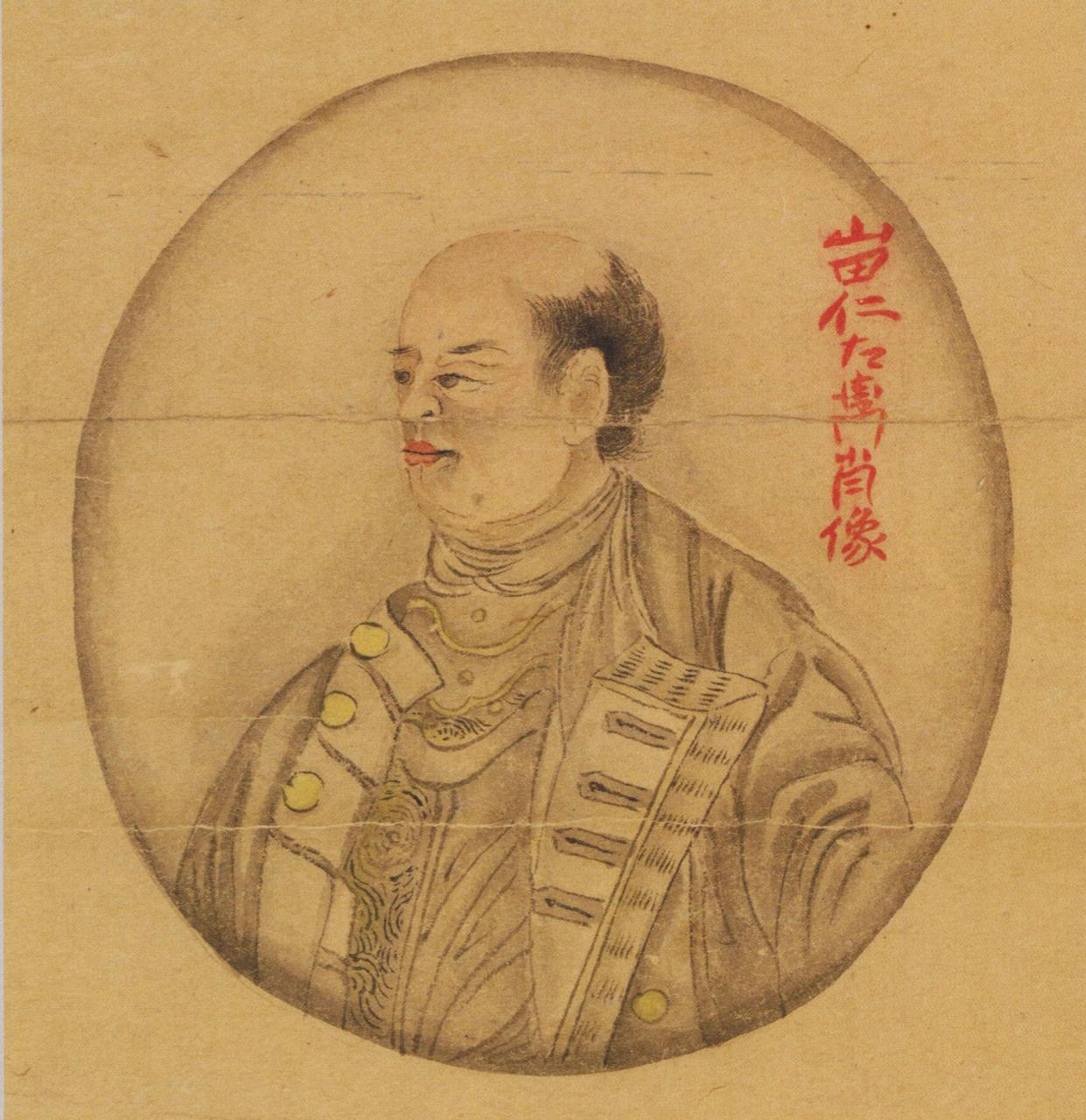
Portrait of Yamada Nagamasa c. 1630

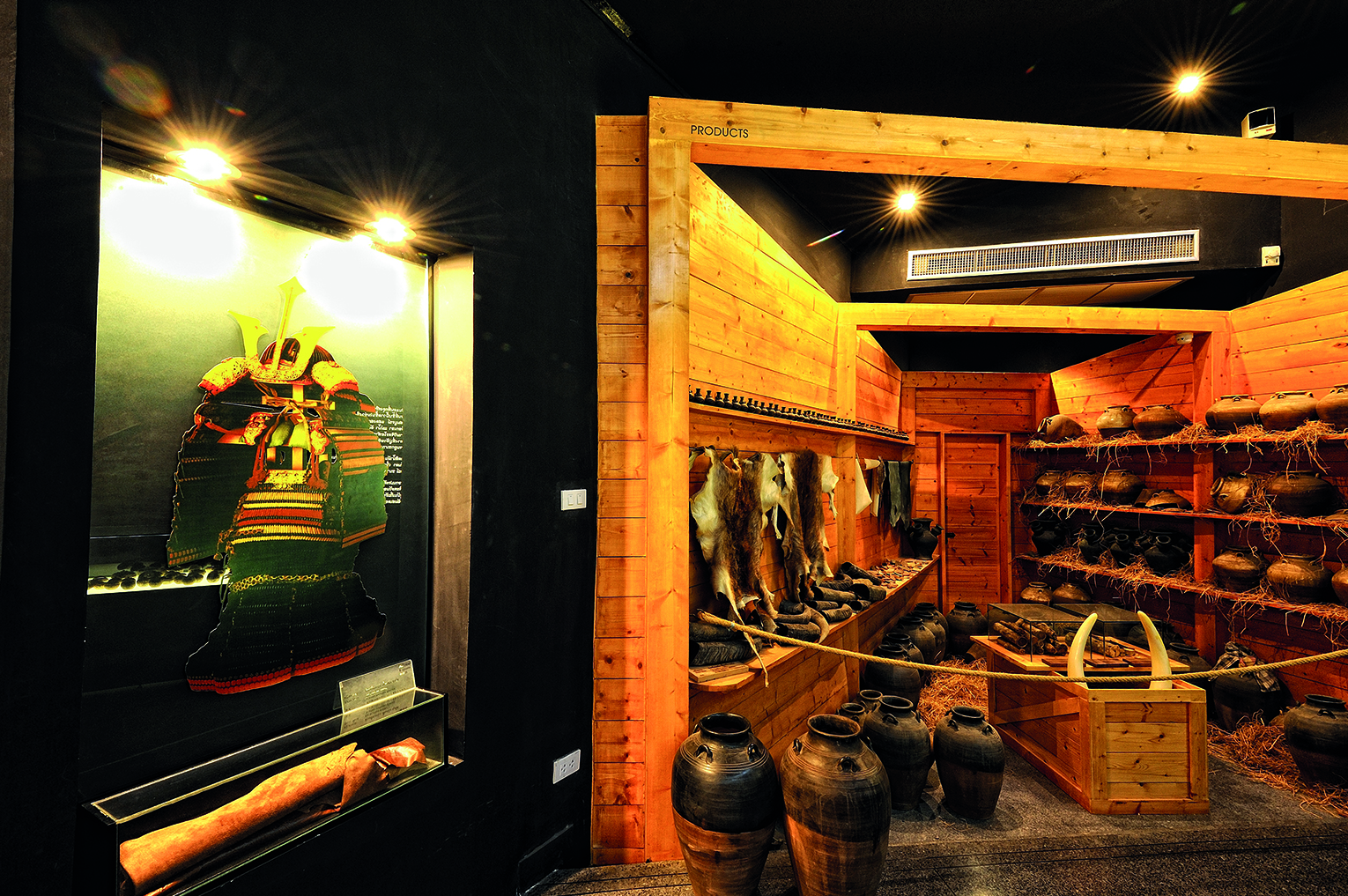
Interior of the Japanese Village museum in Ayutthaya

==== Notable foreigners in 17th-century Ayutthaya ====
- François-Timoléon de Choisy
- Claude de Forbin, French admiral
- Louis Laneau, apostolic vicar of Siam
- Yamada Nagamasa, Japanese adventurer who became the ruler of the Nakhon Si Thammarat
- Constantine Phaulkon, Greek adventurer and first councillor of King Narai
- Father Guy Tachard, French Jesuit writer and Siamese ambassador to France (1688)
- Jeremias van Vliet, Dutch Opperhoofd
- George White, English merchant

== Historiography ==
=== Contemporary accounts of Ayutthaya ===
The amount to which Ayutthaya texts were destroyed in the Burmese sack of 1767 varies greatly. Van Vliet's written records on Siam is the earliest written history of Siam and Ayutthaya, which date from the early to mid 17th century and likely used the religious temple chronicles as his source. The earliest surviving palace chronicle is the Luang Prasoet chronicle, which dates from 1681. The histories of Ayutthaya was not regarded as important until the age of commerce and peace in the 17th and 18th centuries. The religious chronicles are also important to understanding Ayutthaya, which date as early as the 16th century. Early Ayutthaya did not write down its history. A significant portion of written evidence must therefore come from outside accounts. Aside from Van Vliet, a number of Europeans in the 17th and early 18th century wrote surviving accounts of Siam. The Chinese palace chronicles are also instrumental in analyzing Ayutthaya's history.

The Ayutthaya Testimonies are another important account of the Ayutthaya Kingdom. Based on the testimonies of the former inhabitants of the Ayutthaya Kingdom and survived by three different documents, these accounts attests to the description of the city of Ayutthaya and the Ayutthaya Kingdom prior to and during its fall in 1767.

=== Post-Ayutthaya historiography ===
The history of the Ayutthaya Kingdom has been relatively neglected in Thai and foreign historiography, despite extensive research on particular periods of its four-century history. Baker and Pasuk's A History of Ayutthaya: Siam in the Early Modern World, published in 2017, was the first English-language academic book to examine the entire four centuries of the kingdom's history. Southeast Asian historiography developed largely around post-colonial capitals. Because Thailand was never fully colonized, it lacked a European patron through which a national history might have been constructed until the arrival of American influence in the 1960s.

In the early Rattanakosin period, King Rama I compiled surviving Ayutthaya legal records into the Three Seals Law in 1805. Early Rattanakosin documents traced their "national" origins to the founding of Ayutthaya in 1351. In the early 20th century, however, Thai elites drew on European nationalism to construct a nationalist history that diminished Ayutthaya's role. Sukhothai was presented as the first "Thai" kingdom and a golden age of "Thai-ness", associated with Buddhism, Thai-style democracy, free trade, and the abolition of slavery; Rattanakosin represented the "rebirth"; and Ayutthaya the period of decline between them. Ayutthaya consequently remained largely neglected in Thai historiography for much of the half-century following the works of Prince Damrong in the early 20th century.

The nationalist histories of Ayutthaya pioneered by Prince Damrong focused primarily on kings, warfare, and the territorial subjugation of neighbouring states. These themes remain influential in Thailand and in popular historical narratives. From the 1970s onward, however, a new generation of scholars in Thailand and abroad challenged this historiography, beginning notably with Kasetsiri's The Rise of Ayudhya (1977). These scholars increasingly examined the commercial and economic dimensions of Ayutthaya that older accounts had neglected. Newly published sources and translations, including Chinese and Dutch materials, further broadened access to the subject over the following decades.

In 1999, Kasetsiri argued that "Ayutthaya was the first major political, cultural, and commercial center of the Thai."

=== The "General Crisis" hypothesis ===
The idea that Ayutthaya declined after the Europeans left in the late 17th century was first advanced by the Rattanakosin court to legitimise the new dynasty against the Ban Phlu Luang line, and revived in recent decades by Anthony Reid's "Age of Commerce" thesis. Victor Lieberman, followed by Baker and Phongpaichit, challenged Reid's hypothesis. Lieberman argues that Reid extrapolated from a maritime example to the mainland, and instead points to the Qing revocation of the maritime ban and the resulting growth of China–Siam trade. On this view, Ayutthaya's importance lay in its role as a regional Asian trade centre rather than in European dominance.

== Gallery ==
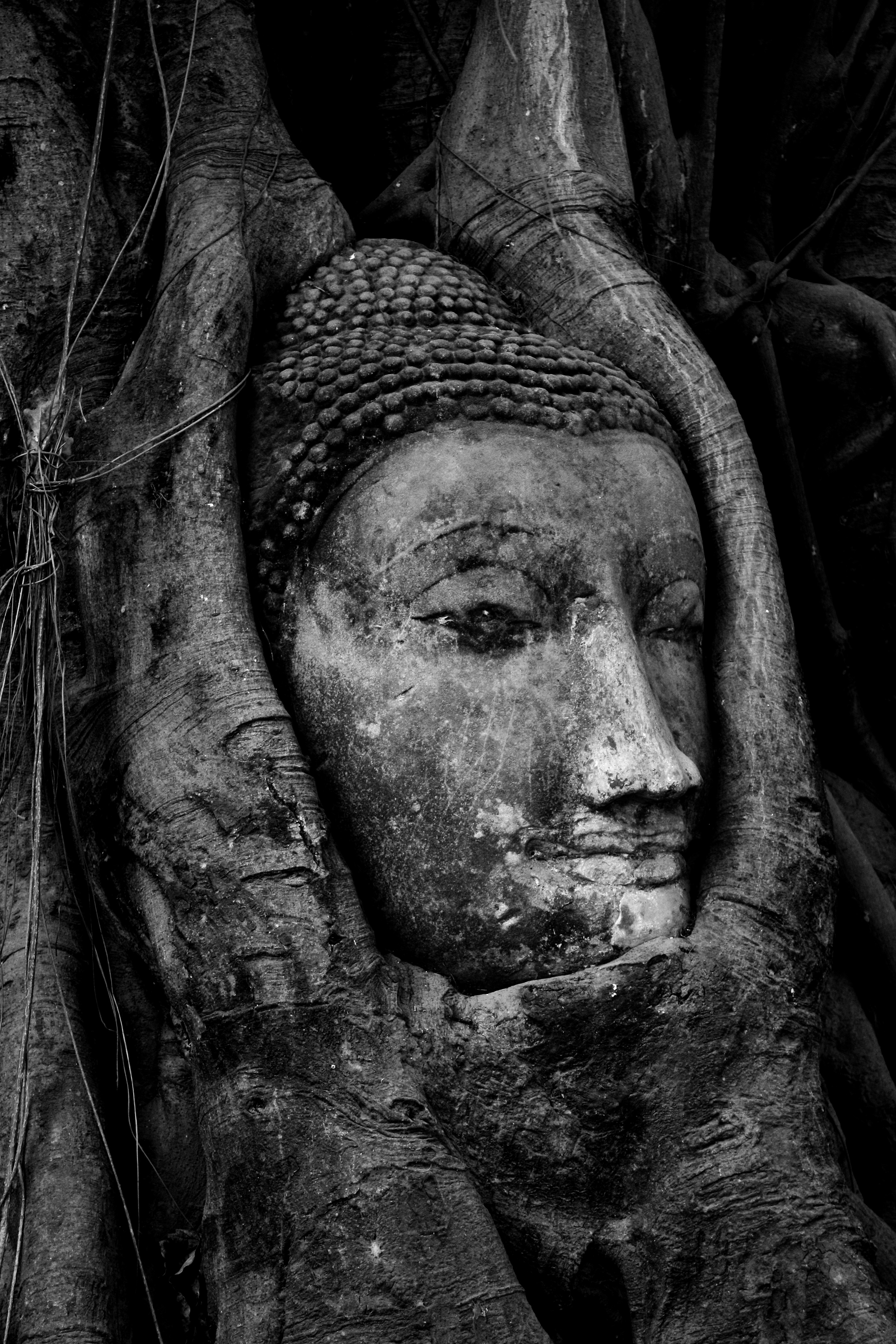
Detached Buddha head encased in fig tree roots

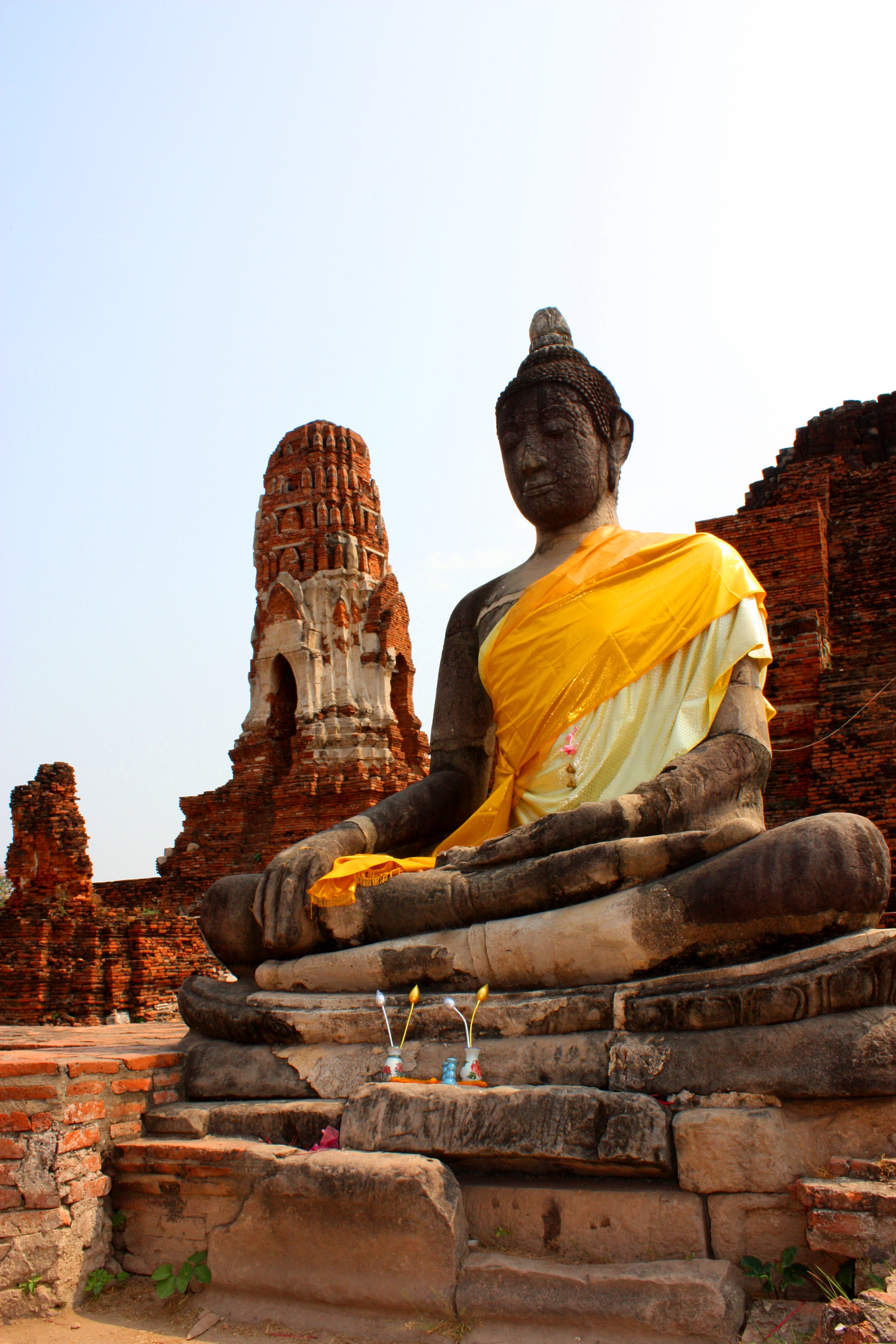
Seated Buddha, Ayutthaya

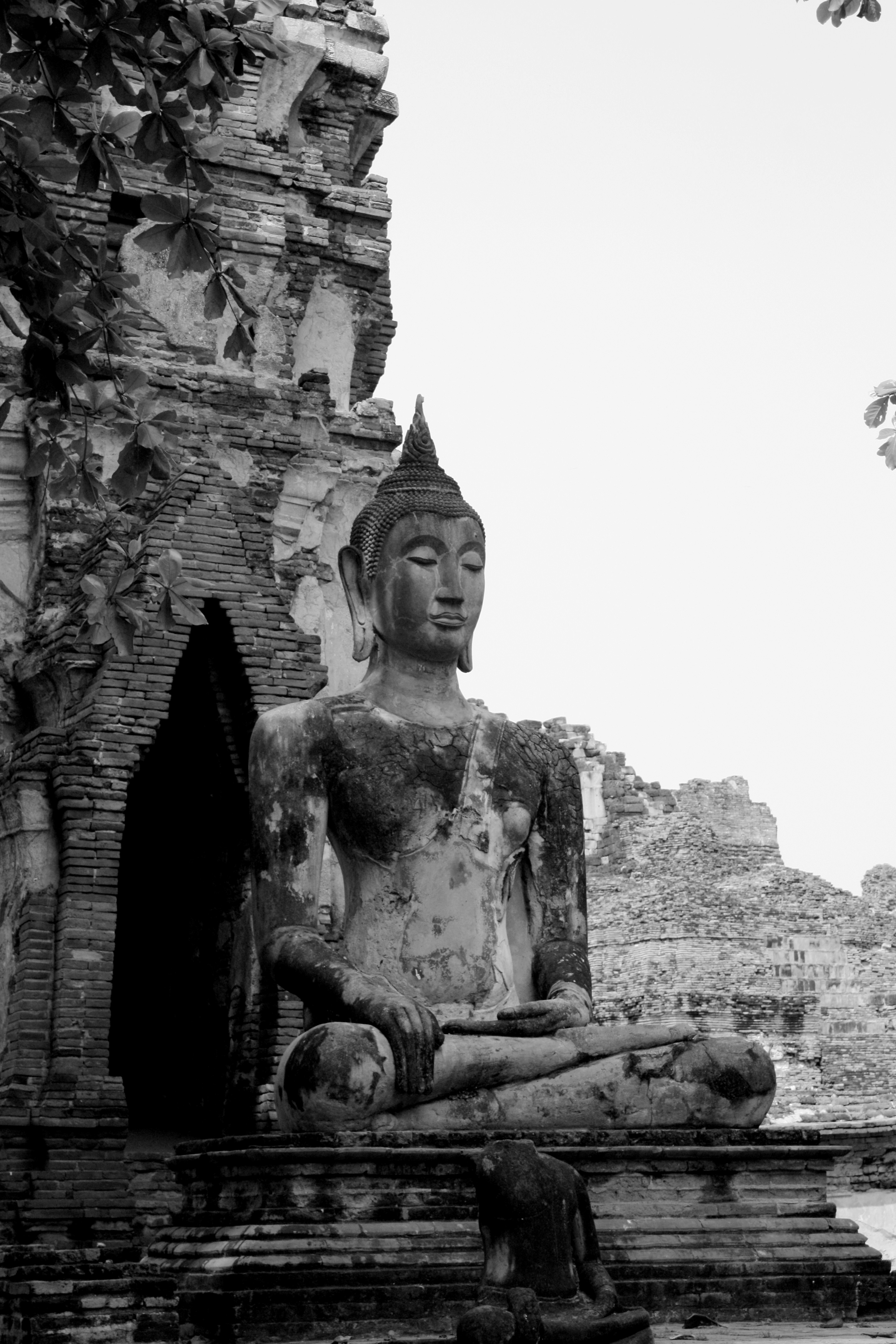
Seated Buddha, Ayutthaya

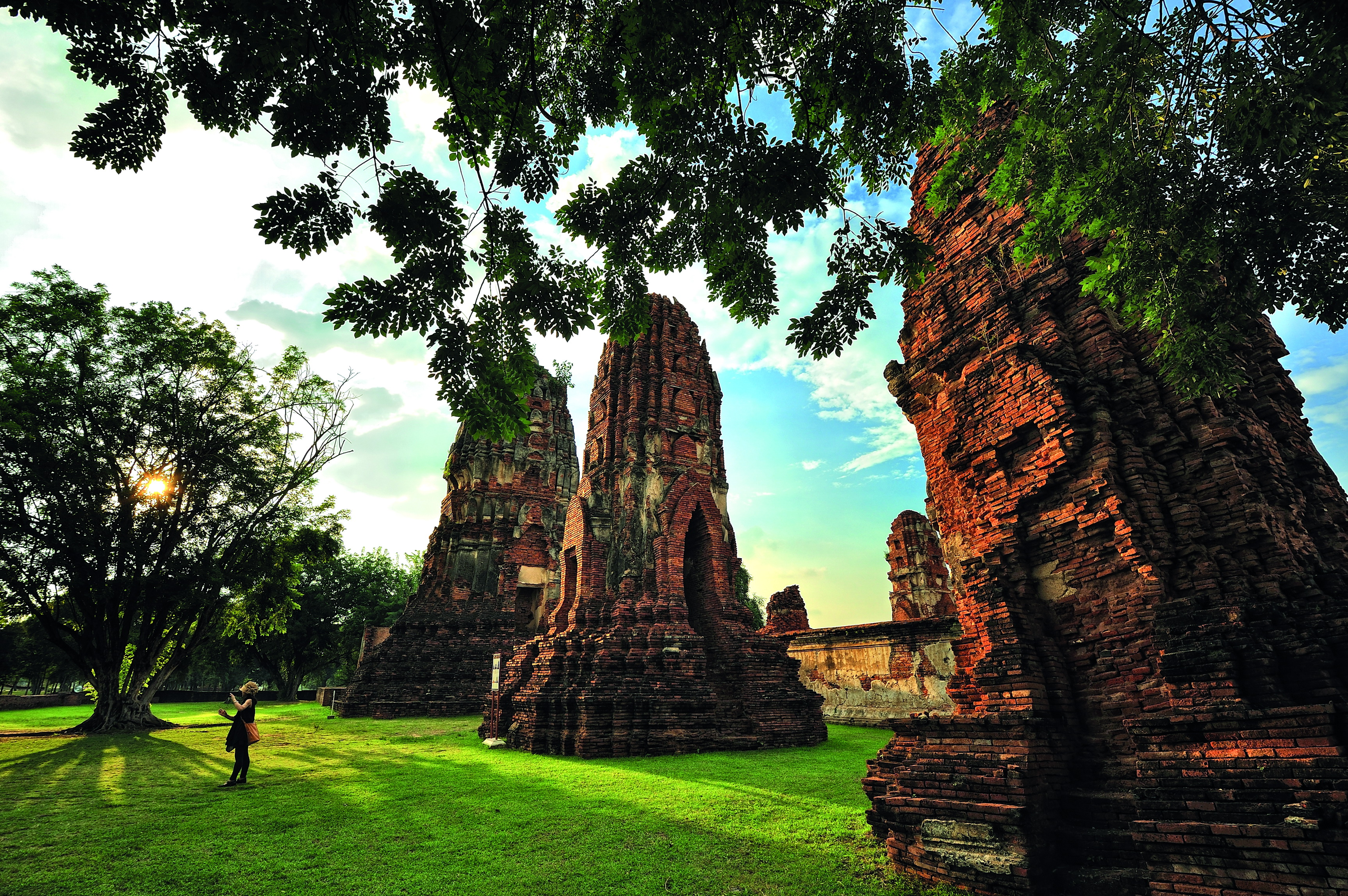
Ayutthaya Historical Park

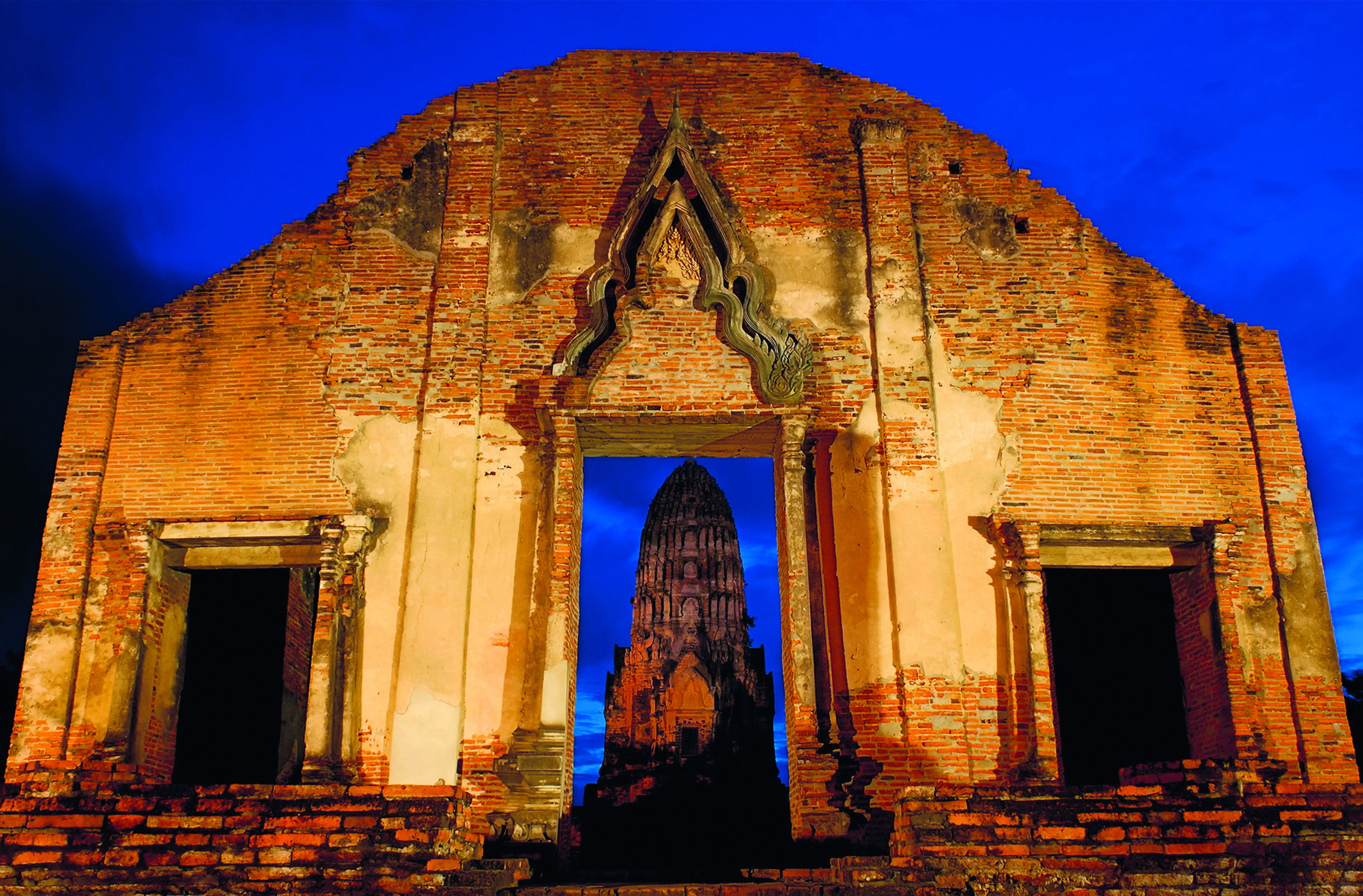
Ayutthaya Historical Park

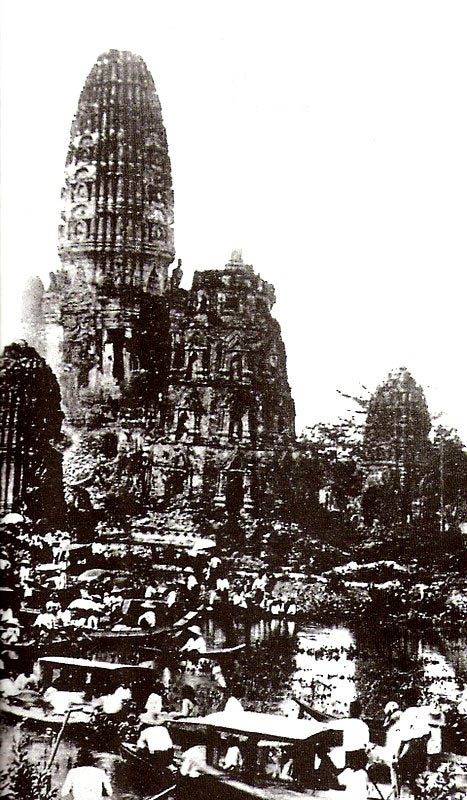
The main prang of Wat Mahathat, collapsed in 1904, photographed in the early twentieth century

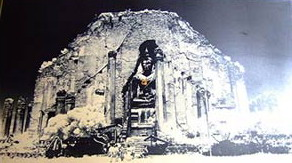
Wihan Phra Mongkhon Bophit before restoration in the late nineteenth and early twentieth century

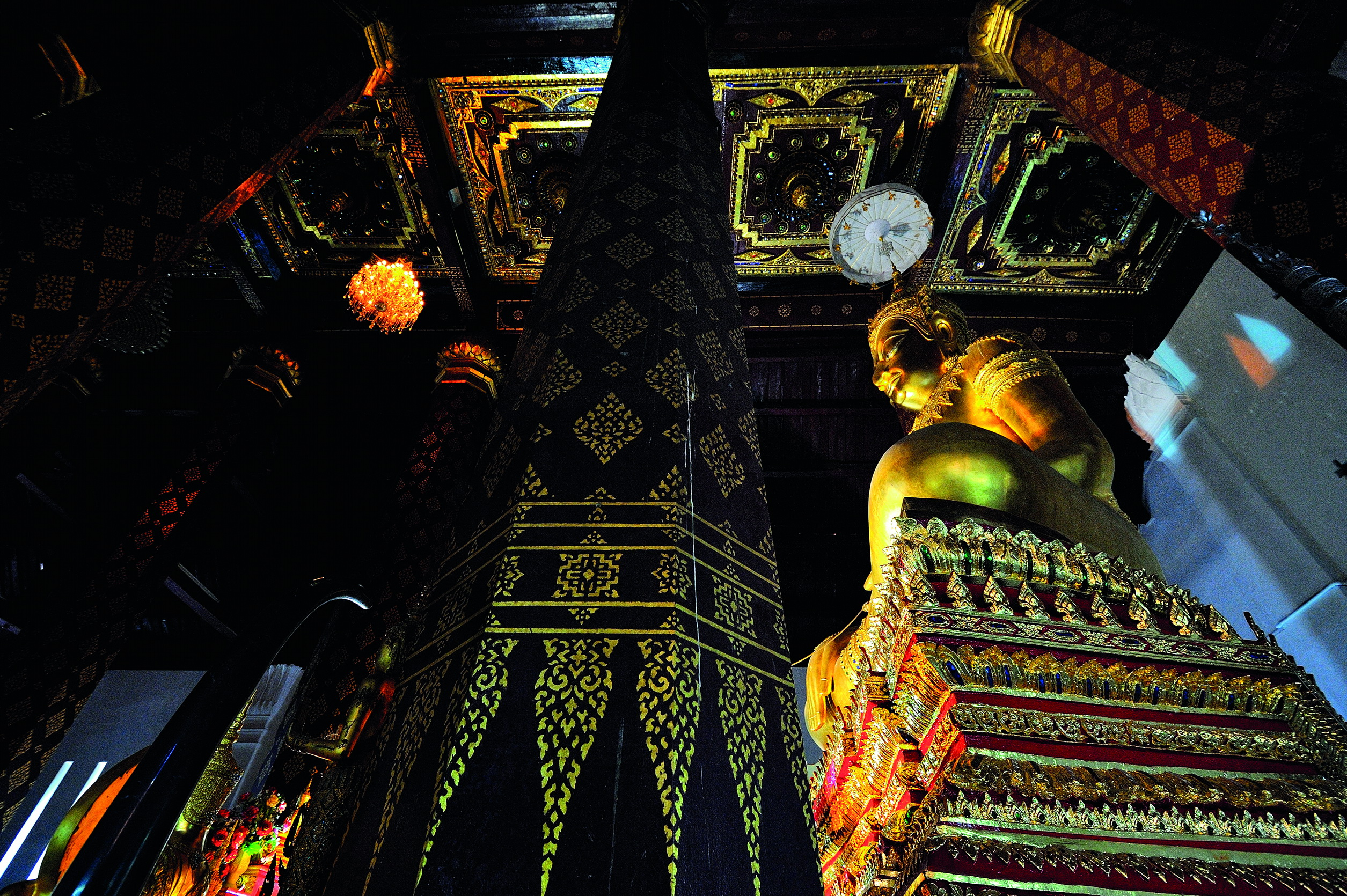
Interior of Wat Na Phra Men

== In popular culture ==
- Love Destiny (TV series) (บุพเพสันนิวาส; Bupphesanniwat), 2018 Thai historical television series
- The Legend of Suriyothai, 2001 Thai biographical historical drama film series about Queen Suriyothai
- King Naresuan, 2007–2015 Thai biographical historical drama film series about King Naresuan

== See also ==
- Ayutthaya Historical Park
- Ayutthaya Province
- Baan Hollanda
- Bang Rajan
- Family tree of Ayutthaya kings
- History of Thailand
- List of Ayutthaya kings

== General references ==
- Original text adapted from the Library of Congress Country Study of Thailand
- Baker, Chris; Phongpaichit, Pasuk (2017). A History of Ayutthaya: Siam in the Early Modern World. Cambridge, England: Cambridge University Press. ISBN 978-1-316-64113-2.
- Higham, Charles (1989). The Archaeology of Mainland Southeast Asia. Cambridge, England: Cambridge University Press. ISBN 0-521-27525-3.
- Kohn, George Childs (1999). Dictionary of Wars (Revised ed.). New York: Facts on File, Inc. ISBN 0-8160-3928-3.
- Lieberman, Victor (2003). Strange Parallels: Volume 1, Integration on the Mainland: Southeast Asia in Global Context, c. 800–1830 (Studies in Comparative World History). Cambridge University Press. ISBN 978-0521800860.
- Marcinkowski, M. Ismail (2005). From Isfahan to Ayutthaya: Contacts between Iran and Siam in the 17th Century. Singapore: Pustaka Nasional. ISBN 9971-77-491-7.
- Rajanubhab, Prince Damrong (2001). Our Wars with the Burmese. Bangkok: White Lotus. ISBN 974-7534-58-4.
- Syamananda, Rong (1990). A History of Thailand. Chulalongkorn University. ISBN 974-07-6413-4.
- Wood, William Alfred Rae (1924). A History of Siam. London: Fisher Unwin Ltd.
- Tossa, Wajupp; Nattavong, Kongdeuane; MacDonald, Margaret Read (2008). Lao Folktales. Libraries Unlimited. ISBN 978-1-59158-345-5.
- Wyatt, David K. (2003). Thailand: A Short History. New Haven, Connecticut: Yale University Press. ISBN 0-300-08475-7.
- Thepthani, Phra Borihan (1953). Thai National Chronicles: the history of the nation since ancient times (in Thai). S. Thammasamakkhi. Archived from the original on 5 November 2023.

— Royal house — Ayutthaya dynasty Founding year: 1351
Preceded by Sukhothai Kingdom	Ruling dynasty of the Ayutthaya Kingdom; 1351–1767	Succeeded by Thonburi Kingdom
