= Wat Thammikarat =

Buddhist temple in Ayutthaya, Thailand

Coordinates: 14.3590°N 100.5617°E

- วัดธรรมิกราช
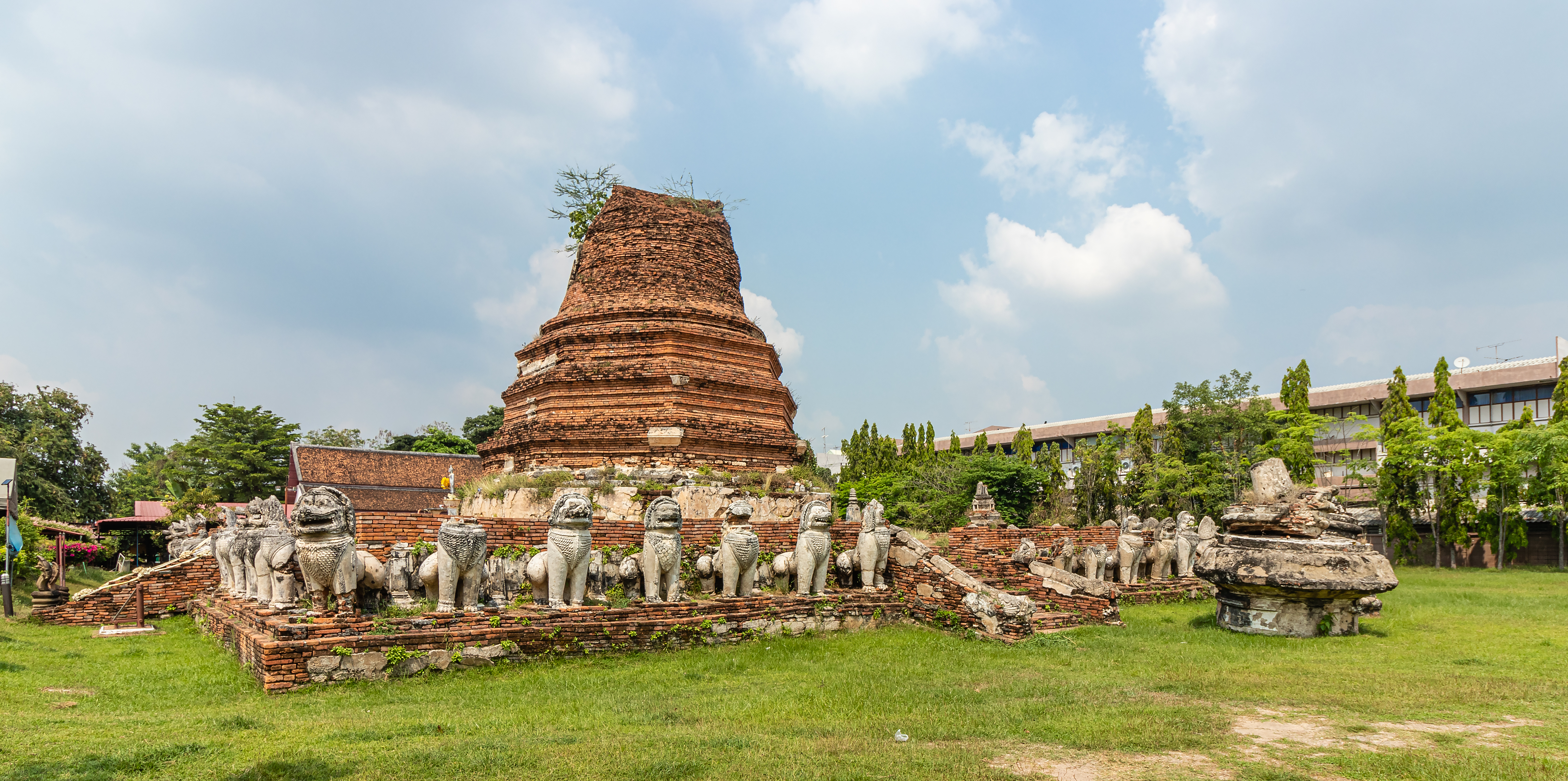

Religion
- Affiliation: Buddhism
- Sect: Theravada
- District: Ayutthaya
- Province: Ayutthaya

Location
- Location: Ayutthaya Historical Park
- Country: Thailand
- Interactive map of Wat Thammikarat
- UNESCO World Heritage Site
- Type: Cultural
- Criteria: iii
- Designated: 1991 (15th session)
- Reference no.: 576
- Region: Asia-Pacific

Wat Thammikarat (Thai: วัดธรรมิกราช, romanized: Wat Dhammikaraj) is temple ruin preserve as historical site on the city island near U-Thong Road, just outside the Ayutthaya Historic Park, in Phra Nakhon Si Ayutthaya, Thailand. The temple had undergone multiple restorations. Though many structures remain in ruins, new buildings have been added as it is now an active temple.

Key features include Chedi Singh Lom (Thai: เจดีย์สิงห์ล้อม, lit. 'Lion Surrounded Chedi') a large, bell-shaped chedi with an octagonal base, surrounded by detailed lion figures made of brick and mortar with stucco decorations. This chedi also includes multi-headed Naga figures, and remnants of smaller monuments and spires are scattered around it.

== History ==
Wat Thammikarat likely predates Ayutthaya Kingdom's founding in 1351, linked to an older Khmer settlement named Ayodaya. Archaeological evidence suggests a pre-12th-century Dvaravati town existed near the site, with Khmer-style stone lions around the chedi and a bronze Buddha head in U Thong Style. Northern Thai chronicles also mention that Phraya Thammikarat, son of King Sai Nam Phung, built the monastery, giving it its name.

In 1610, Somdet Phra Boromma Trailokkanat restored a significant site by constructing a nine-room viharn called Harn Song Dhamma for listening to Buddhist sermons. This viharn originally housed a bronze Buddha head from the U-Thong period, but now was relocated to be kept at the Chao Sam Phraya Museum. Another viharn was built to honor a royal recovery from illness of the queen. The site contains a 12-meter-long reclining Buddha with toes covered in gold-leafed and mirror pieces. On the south there is also the main chedi nearby with bell-shaped and octagonal base, encircled by 52 mortar singha (lion) statues, differ from other chedis commonly surrounded by elephant statues.

The temple's ubosot houses a white Buddha image in the subduing Mara posture, believed to date back to the early Rattanakosin period. The temple is notable for its pre-Ayutthaya art, making it a recommended destination for art enthusiasts. Visitors can access Wat Thammikaraj via the same route as Wat Phra Mongkhon Bophit and Wat Phra Si Sanphet

== Gallery ==
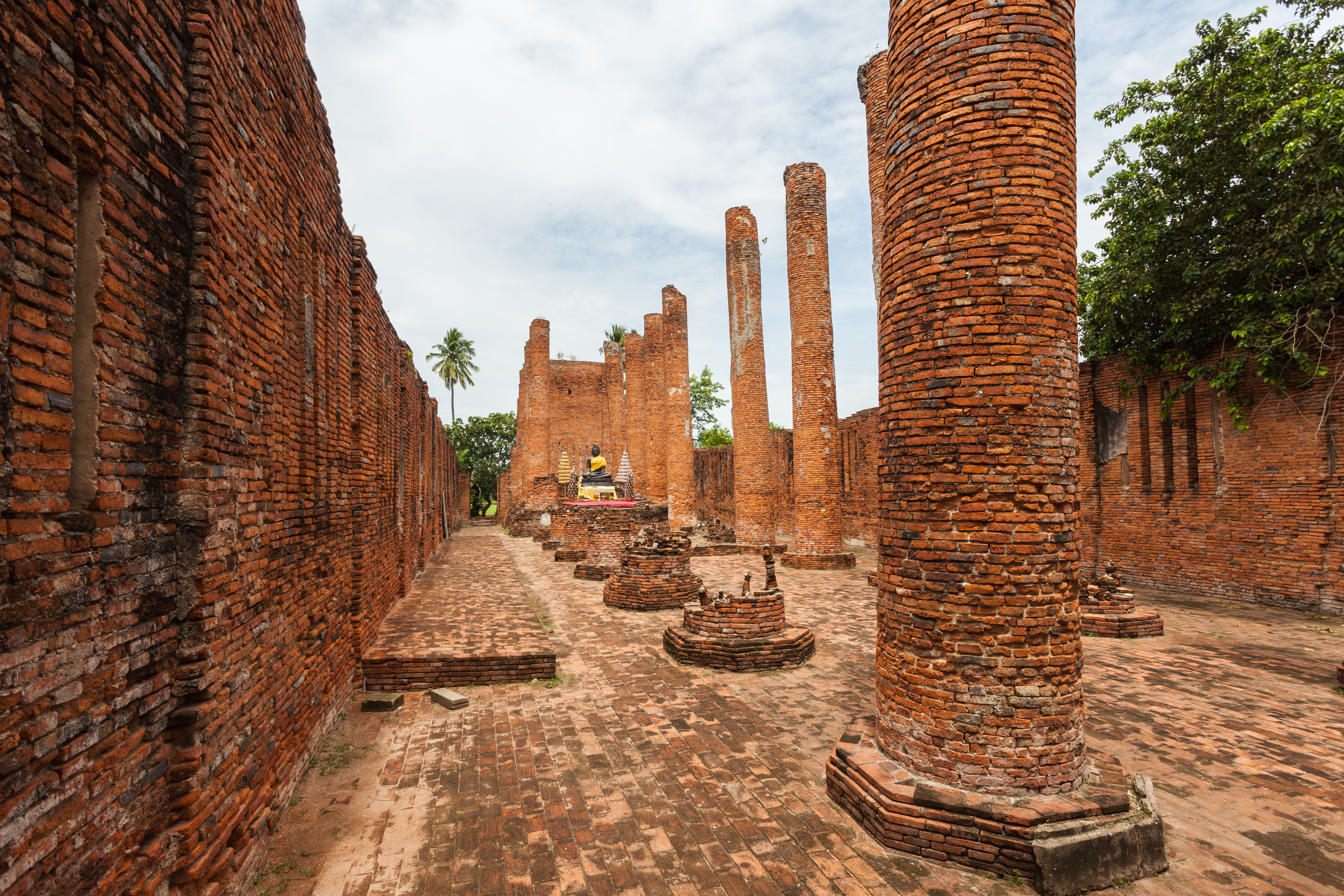
Nine-room Viharn, October 2013

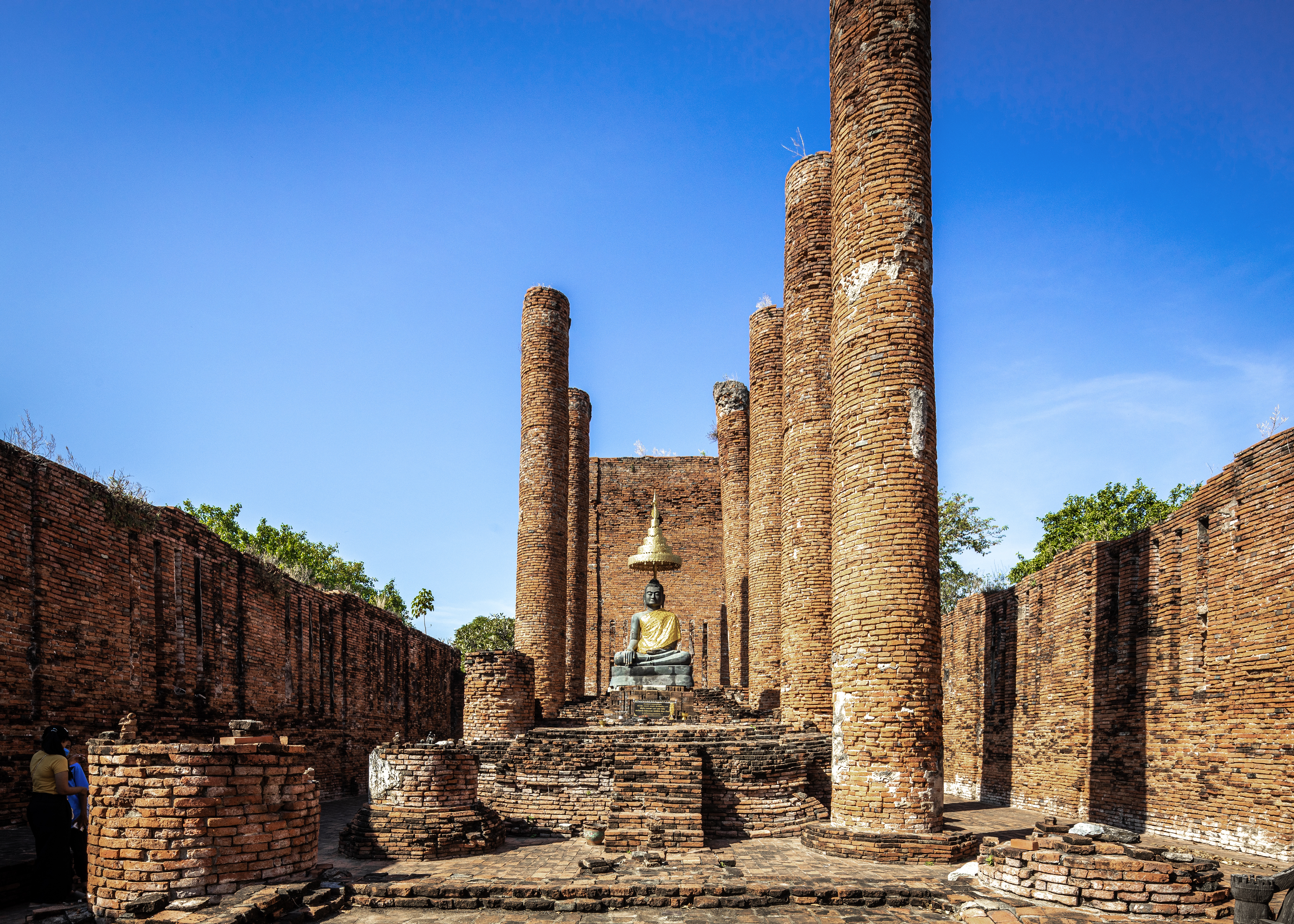
Nine-room Viharn, December 2023

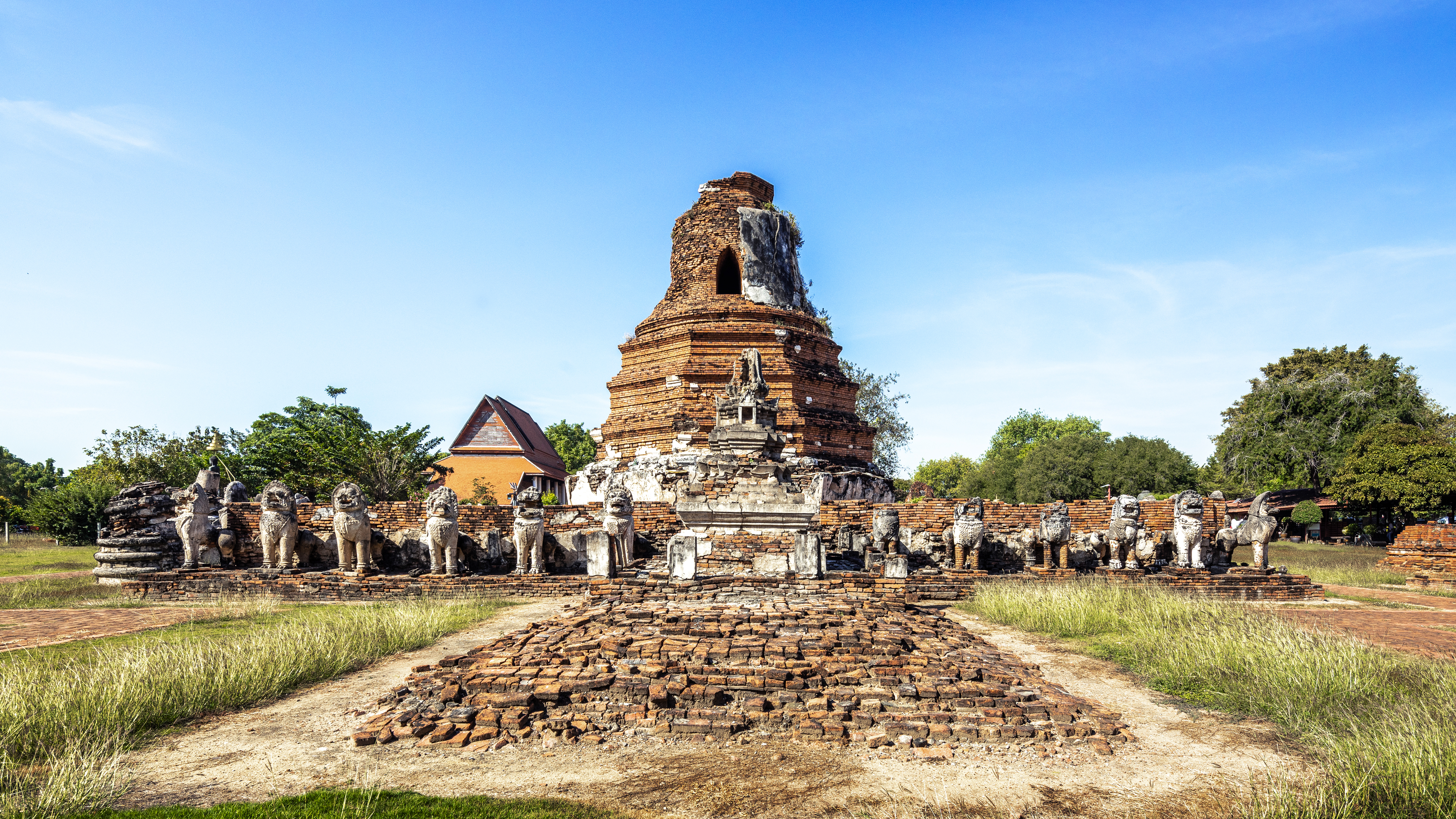
Chedi Singha Lom

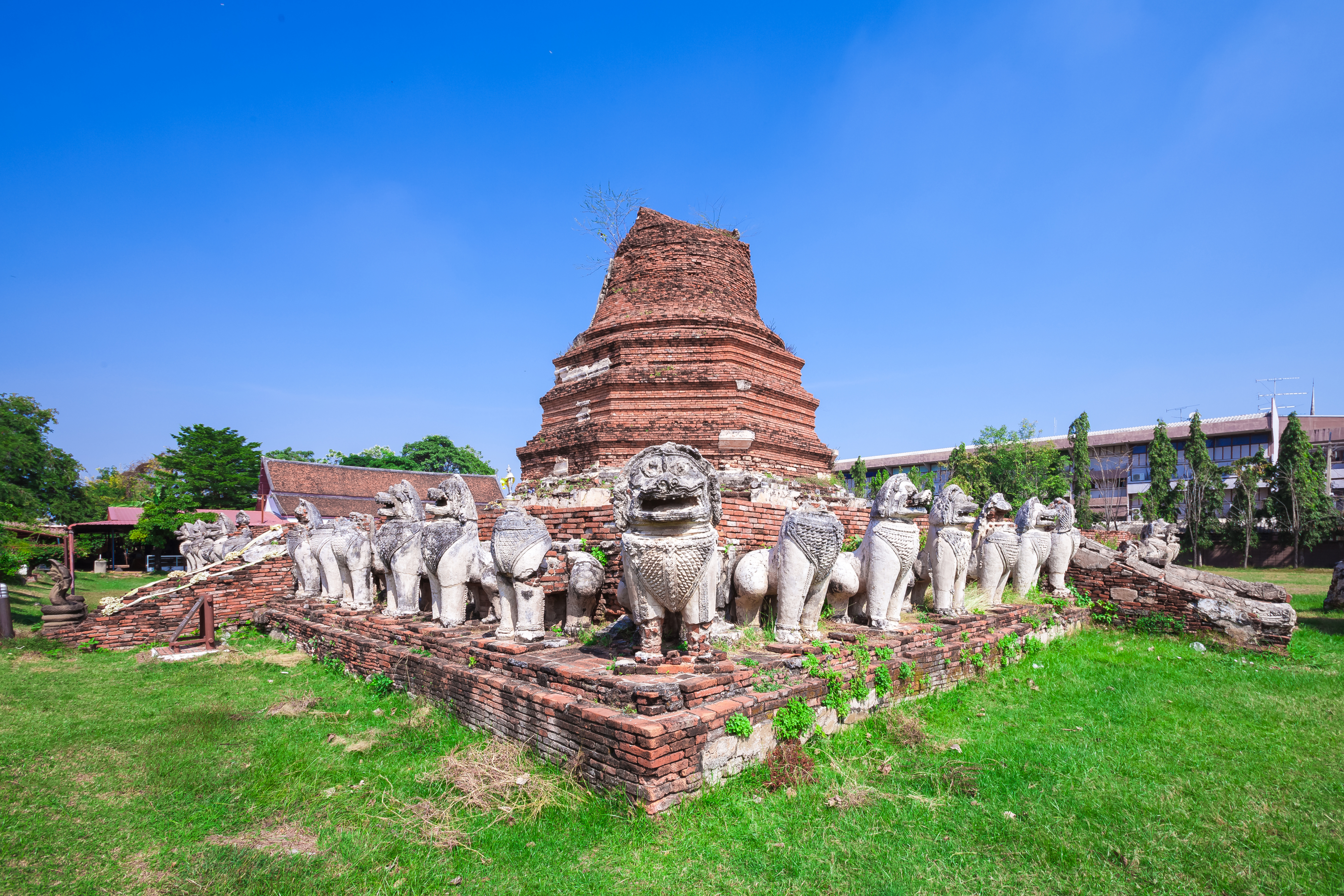
Chedi Singh Lom from west side

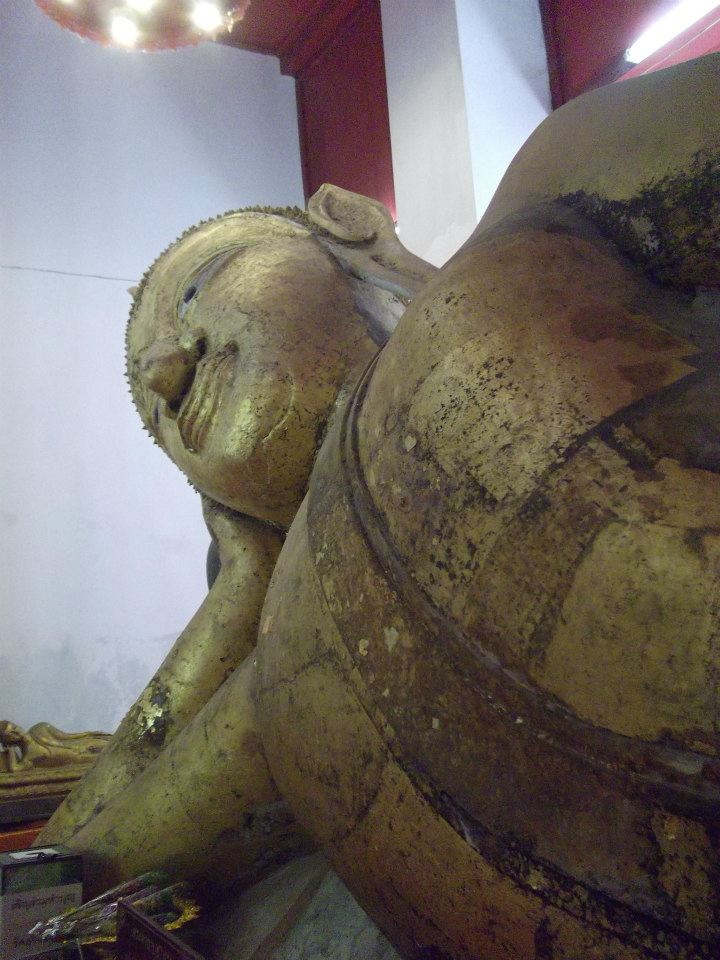
Inclined Buddha statue

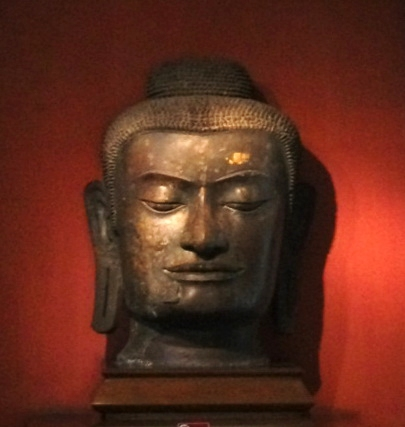
Bronze Buddha Head kept in national museum
