= Phra Nakhon Si Ayutthaya (city) =

City in Ayutthaya, Thailand

Phra Nakhon Si Ayutthaya พระนครศรีอยุธยา
- City Municipality
- City of Phra Nakhon Si Ayutthaya เทศบาลนครพระนครศรีอยุธยา
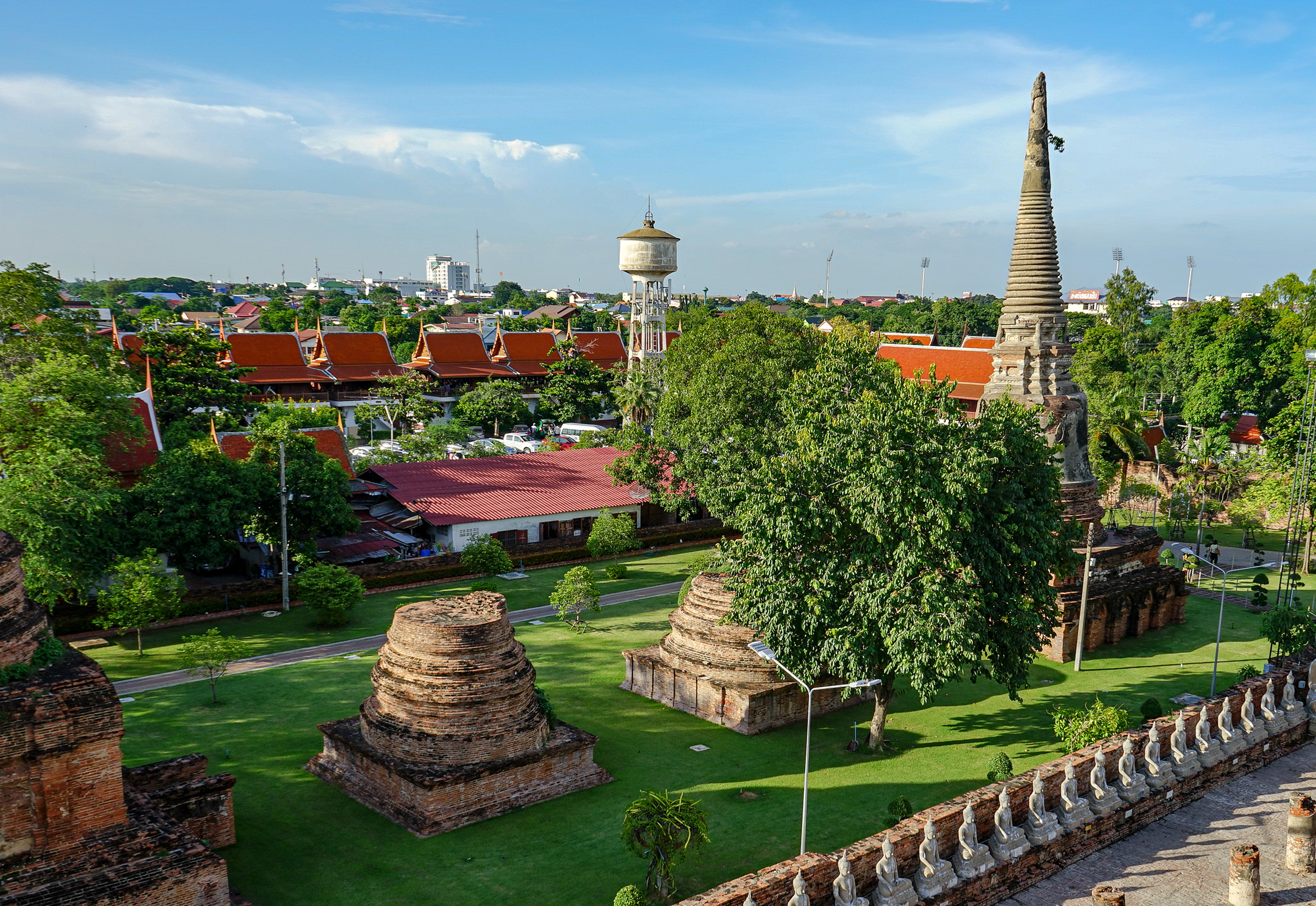
- View of the Ayutthaya Historical Park, Phra Nakhon Si Ayutthaya, Thailand.

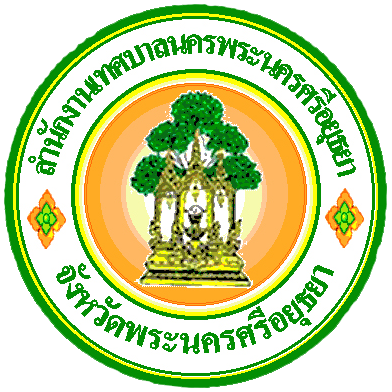
- Seal
- Nickname(s): Ayodhya, Krung Kao
- Location in Thailand
- Coordinates: 14°20′52″N 100°33′38″E
- Country: Thailand
- Province: Phra Nakhon Si Ayutthaya
- District: Phra Nakhon Si Ayutthaya
- Founded as Krung Thep Dvaravati Si Ayutthaya: 1351
- Became municipality: 1935
- Founder: Ramathibodi I
- Named for: Ayodhya, Uttar Pradesh, India

Government
  - Type: City Municipality
  - Mayor: Somsong Sappakosonlakul

Area
  - Total: 14.84 km^{2} (5.73 sq mi)

Population (2020)
  - Total: 50,830
  - Density: 3,425/km^{2} (8,871/sq mi)
- Registered residents only
- Time zone: UTC+7 (ICT)
- Postcode: 13xxx
- Area code: (+66) 35
- Website: ayutthayacity.go.th/

Historic City of Ayutthaya
UNESCO World Heritage Site
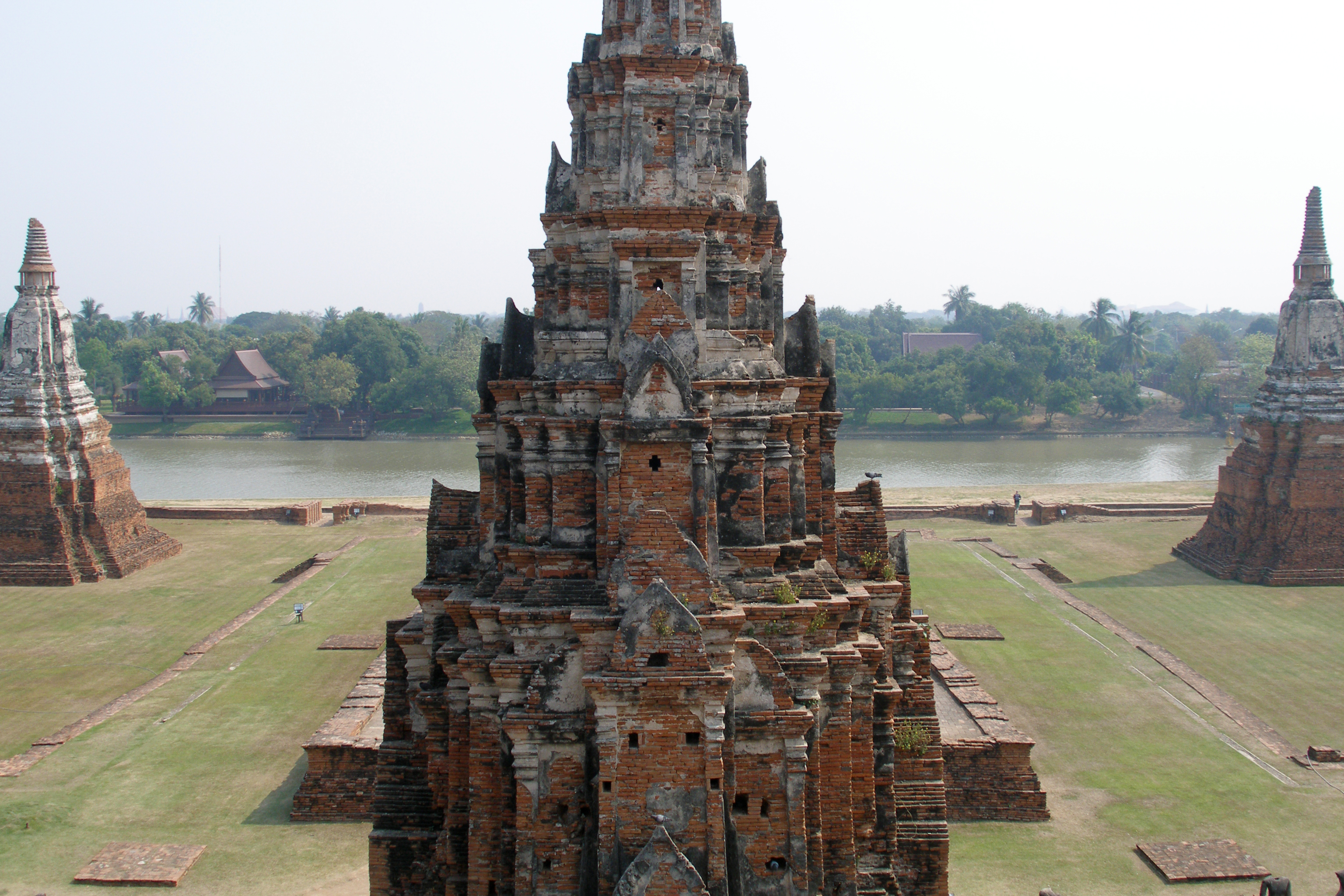
- Interactive map of Historic City of Ayutthaya
- Criteria: Cultural: III, IV
- Reference: 576
- Inscription: 1991 (15th Session)

Phra Nakhon Si Ayutthaya (Note: Thai: พระนครศรีอยุธยา, pronounced [pʰráʔ ná(ʔ).kʰɔ̄ːn sǐː ʔà.jút.tʰá.jāː]), commonly known locally as Ayutthaya, is the capital of Phra Nakhon Si Ayutthaya province in Thailand. It lies on an island at the confluence of the Chao Phraya and Pa Sak rivers. Ayutthaya was the capital of the Ayutthaya Kingdom and, between the 14th and 18th centuries, grew into one of the world's largest cities and a major hub of diplomacy and commerce, before its destruction during the Burmese invasion of 1767.

Today, Ayutthaya is a major centre of cultural tourism, while the surrounding area forms part of Thailand's industrial and transport corridor north of Bangkok; its historic core is protected as the Ayutthaya Historical Park, a UNESCO World Heritage Site.

== Etymology ==
The city's formal name at its founding was Krung Thep Dvaravati Si Ayutthaya (Note: Thai: กรุงเทพทวารวดีศรีอยุธยา, RTGS: Krung Thep Thawarawadi Si Ayutthaya, IPA: [kruŋ tʰêːp tʰá.waː.rá.wá.diː sǐː ʔà.jút.tʰá.jaː]), a title carrying profound historical and cosmological significance. Krung Thep (กรุงเทพ) translates to "City of Angels" or the "Abode of Celestial Beings," reflecting the capital's status as a divine center. Dvaravati (ทวารวดี) refers to the ancient civilization that flourished in the Chao Phraya River basin between the 6th and 11th centuries CE, asserting Ayutthaya as its rightful successor. Ayutthaya (อยุธยา) is derived from Sanskrit अयोध्या (Ayodhya), the invincible city of Rama in the Hindu epic Ramayana (adapted as the Thai national epic, Ramakien). Following the foundation of Bangkok in 1782, King Rama I initially adopted this same ceremonial title for the new capital to symbolize its continuity from Ayutthaya.

In the name Phra Nakhon Si Ayutthaya (พระนครศรีอยุธยา), the word phra (from Khmer: preah ព្រះ) is a prefix denoting royalty or divinity, while nakhon (from Pali: nagara) signifies an important or capital city.

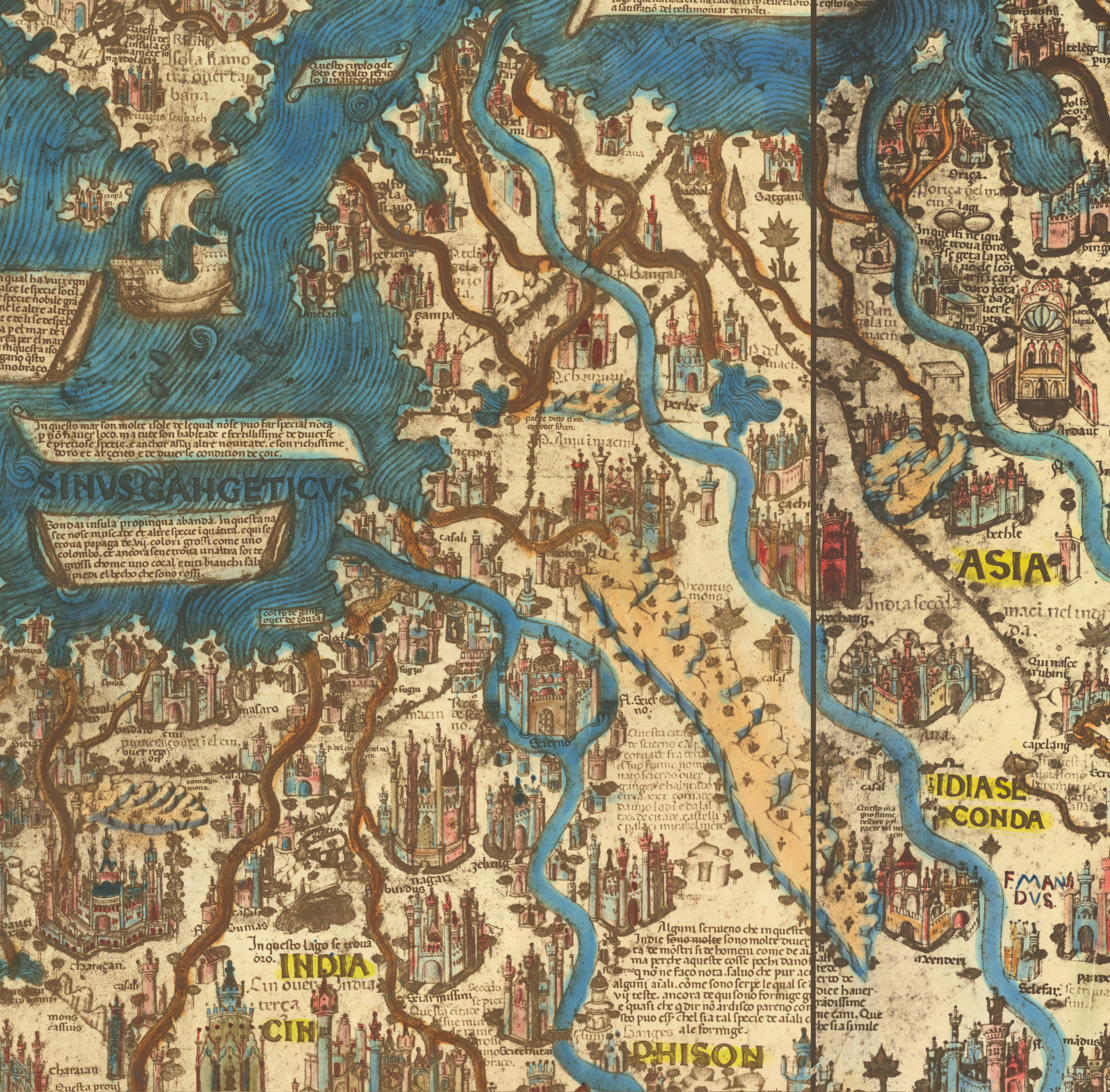
Ayutthaya is shown in the Fra Mauro map of the world (approximately 1450 CE, with south at the top) under the name "Scierno", derived from the Persian "Shahr-i Naw", meaning "New City"

== History ==
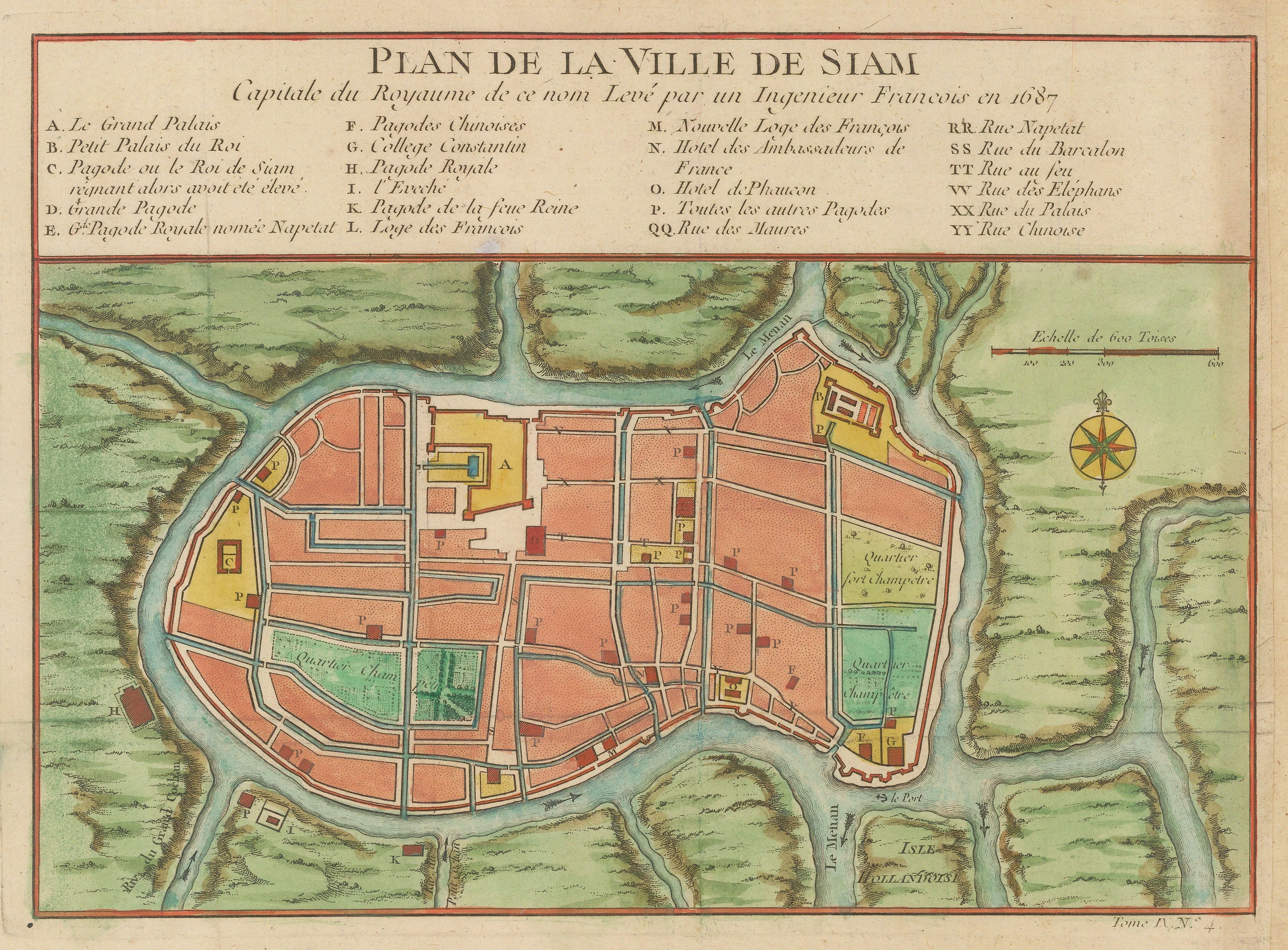
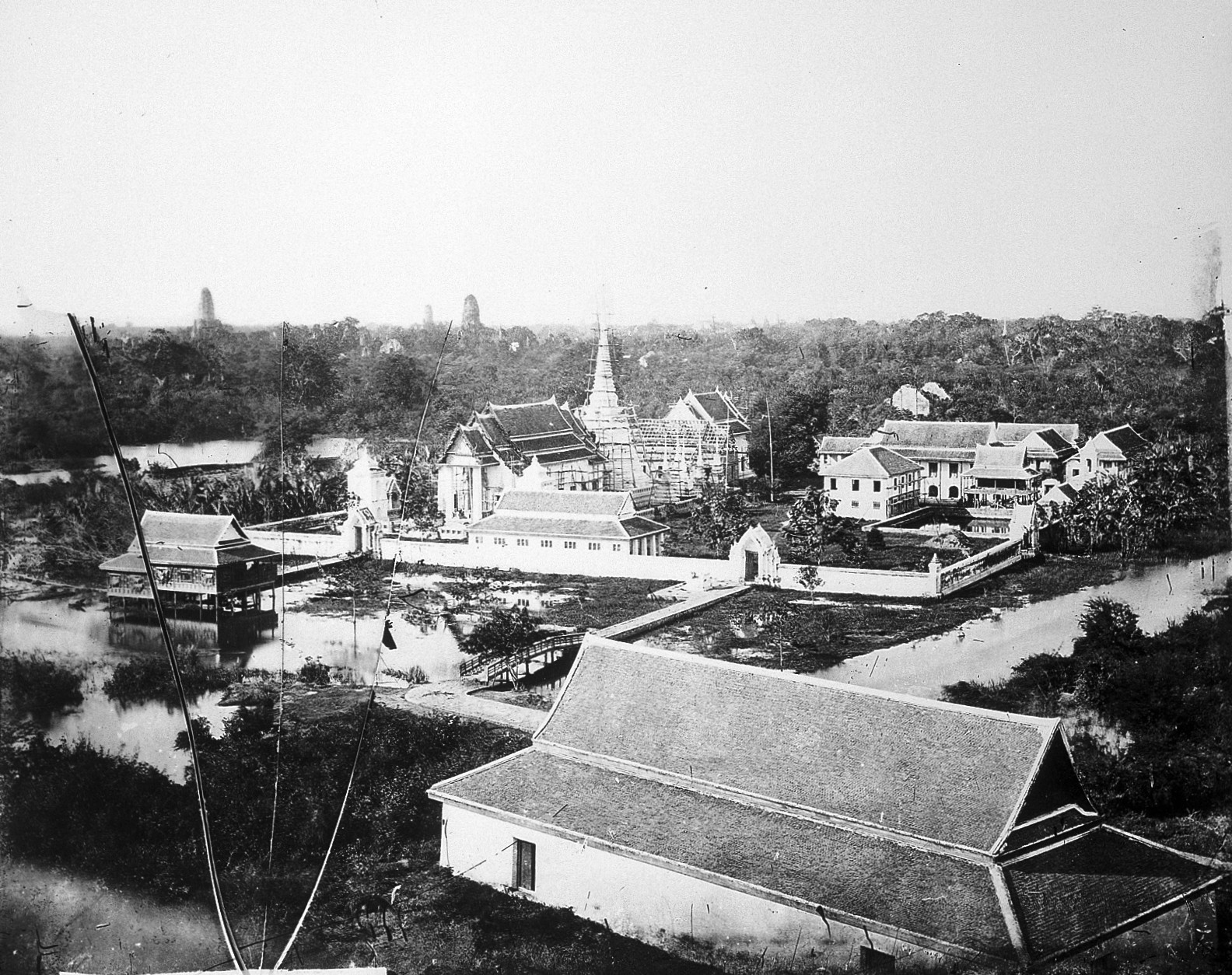
City Map of Ayutthaya in 1687 (left) Ayutthaya skyline, photographed by John Thomson, early 1866 (right)

Ayutthaya was officially founded in 1351^{[a]} by King Uthong, who went there to escape a smallpox outbreak in Lopburi and proclaimed it the capital of his kingdom, often referred to as the Ayutthaya Kingdom or Siam. Archaeological and written evidence has revealed that Ayutthaya was inhabited as early as the late 13th century, before the arrival of Uthong. Further evidence of this can be seen with Wat Phanan Choeng, which was founded in 1324.

Ayutthaya became the second Siamese capital after Sukhothai. Early Western accounts describe Ayutthaya as a "noble" and "wealthy" city. In the late Ayutthaya period, European visitors described it as among the world's wealthiest and most cosmopolitan cities. It is estimated that by the year 1600, Ayutthaya had a population of about 300,000, with the population perhaps reaching 1,000,000 around 1700, making it one of the world's largest cities at that time, a period during which UNESCO describes Ayutthaya as flourishing into one of the world's largest and most cosmopolitan urban areas and a center of global diplomacy and commerce.

In 1767, the city was destroyed by the Burmese army, resulting in the collapse of the kingdom. The ruins of the old city are preserved in the Ayutthaya Historical Park, which is recognised internationally as a World Heritage Site. The ruins, characterised by the prang (reliquary towers) and gigantic monasteries, give an idea of the city's past splendour.

Modern Ayutthaya was refounded a few kilometres to the east. Although the former royal capital never regained its previous political prominence, the area remained inhabited and gradually developed into a provincial capital. Over time, conservation and archaeological work concentrated on the ruined core of the old city, while the modern urban centre expanded beyond the island. Today, Ayutthaya's historic monuments and cultural landscape continue to shape the city's identity and economy, particularly through heritage tourism and religious pilgrimage.

== Population ==
Since 2005, the population of Ayutthaya has been declining.

Estimation date	31 Dec 2005	31 Dec 2010	31 Dec 2015	31 Dec 2019
Population	55,097	54,190	52,940	50,830

== Geography ==
The city is located about 40 miles (64 km) north of Bangkok, at the confluence of the Chao Phraya, Lopburi and Pa Sak rivers, and on the main north–south railway linking Chiang Mai to Bangkok. The old city is on an island formed by a bend of the Chao Phraya on the west and south sides, the Pa Sak on the east side and the Klong Muang canal on the northern side.

=== Urban Planning and Canal System ===
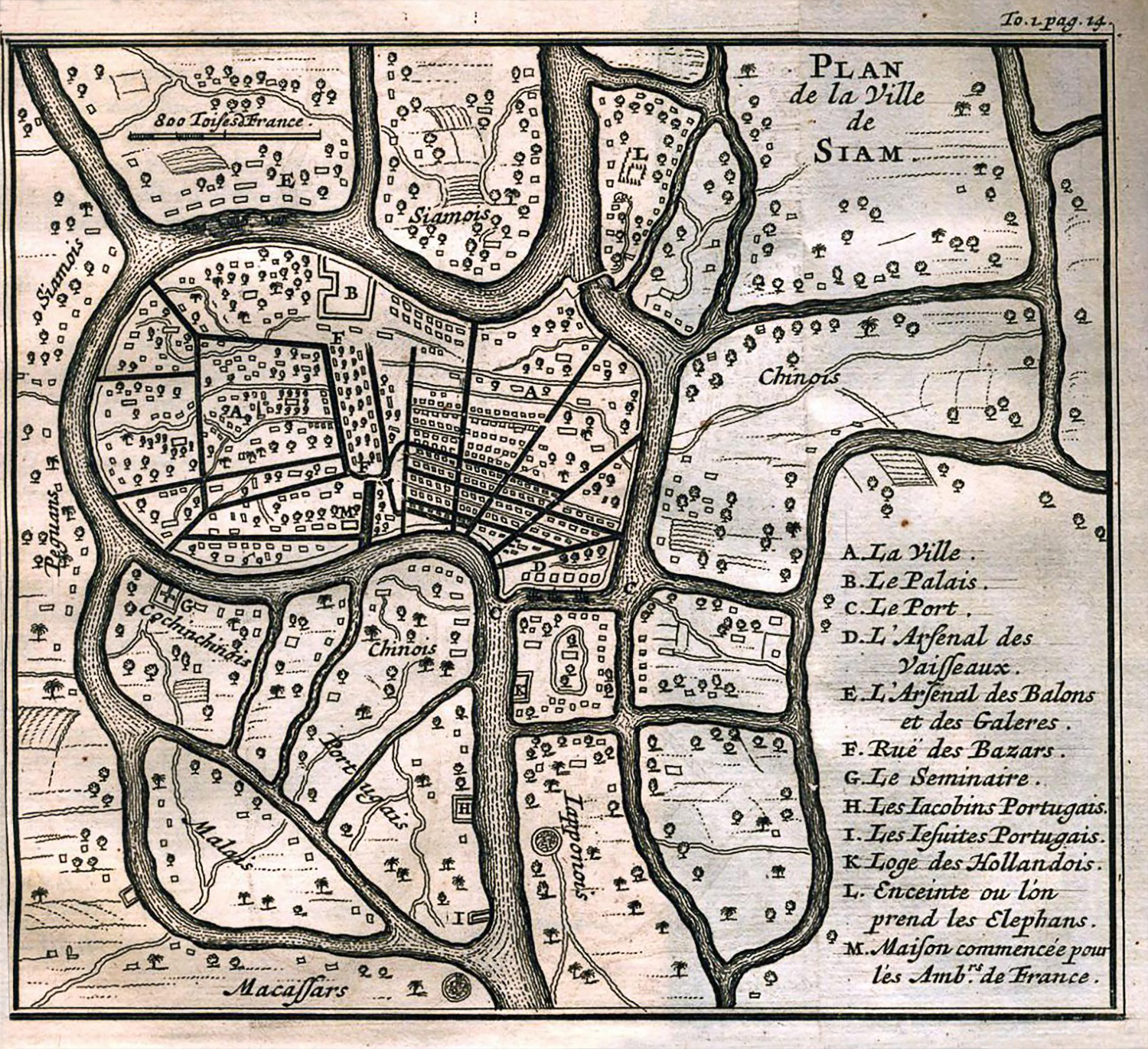
Simon de la Loubère's 1691 map of Ayutthaya.

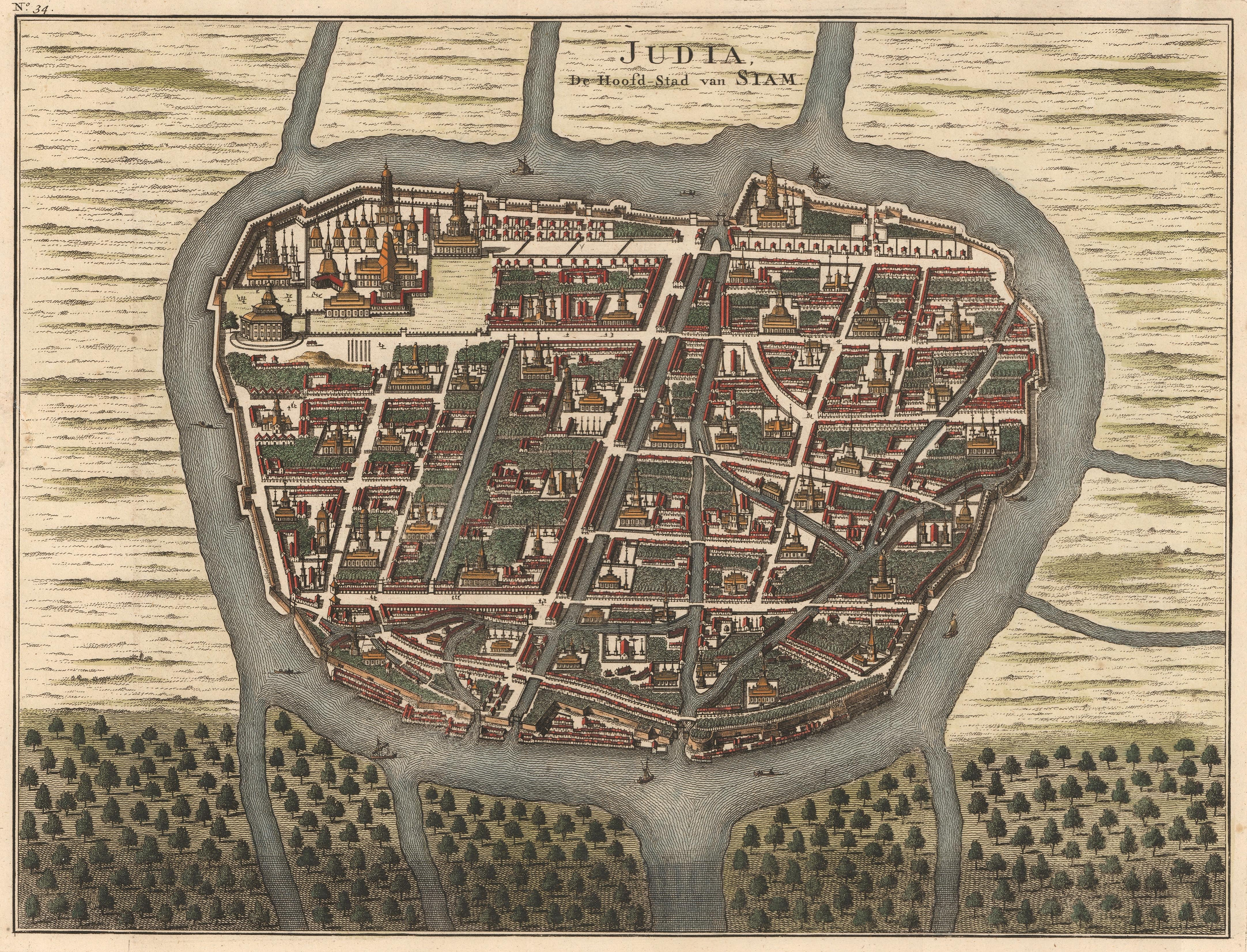
1726 map of Ayutthaya by François Valentijn, depicting the city during its late Ayutthaya-period peak. The map shows the island city surrounded by rivers and intersected by a network of canals and waterways.

Ayutthaya is geographically characterized as an island city surrounded by three major rivers: the Lopburi River to the north, the Pa Sak River to the east, and the Chao Phraya River to the south and west. The city's layout demonstrates sophisticated hydraulic engineering and urban planning, featuring an extensive network of man-made canals excavated for transportation, flood drainage, and domestic water supply. According to UNESCO, Ayutthaya was characterized by a systematic city-planning grid of roads, canals, and moats, supported by an extremely advanced hydraulic water-management system during the Ayutthaya period. During this period, the city was sometimes known as the "Venice of the East".

The internal canal system consisted of three primary north-south arteries that served as the backbone of the city's functional zones:

- Khlong Chakai Yai (Khlong Tho): Located in the western part of the island, this canal played a vital role in administration and governance. It bordered the Grand Palace, with archaeological evidence indicating a sophisticated water diversion system that fed palace reservoirs, such as Sa Kaeo and Sa Rakhang, as well as the moats surrounding the Banyong Rattanaat Throne Hall.
- Khlong Pratu Khao Pluak (Khlong Pratu Chin): Traversing the center of the island city, this waterway served as the primary link to the religious heart of the capital. It passed through major temple complexes, including Wat Mahathat and Wat Ratchaburana, which functioned as the spiritual and educational centers of the kingdom.
- Khlong Nai Kai (Khlong Makham Riang): Situated in the east, this canal was the principal economic and commercial artery. It connected key international trading districts, such as the Chinese quarter (Nai Kai and Sam Ma districts) and the maritime markets near Pom Phet fortress, where foreign merchants and local artisans converged for trade.

The synergy between the surrounding natural rivers and the internal canal network established Ayutthaya as a major international port city, shaping its political, religious, and socio-economic landscape for centuries.

=== Climate ===
Ayutthaya, located in the central plains, is affected by three seasons:

- Hot Season: March – May
- Rainy season: June – October
- Cool season: November – February

Climate data for Ayutthaya
Month	Jan	Feb	Mar	Apr	May	Jun	Jul	Aug	Sep	Oct	Nov	Dec	Year
Mean daily maximum °C (°F)	31.6 (88.9)	34.0 (93.2)	36.7 (98.1)	37.4 (99.3)	36.8 (98.2)	34.2 (93.6)	33.8 (92.8)	32.8 (91.0)	32.3 (90.1)	32.3 (90.1)	32.0 (89.6)	30.9 (87.6)	33.7 (92.7)
Mean daily minimum °C (°F)	18.4 (65.1)	20.2 (68.4)	24.4 (75.9)	25.6 (78.1)	26.4 (79.5)	26.3 (79.3)	25.5 (77.9)	24.8 (76.6)	24.4 (75.9)	23.5 (74.3)	21.6 (70.9)	19.4 (66.9)	23.4 (74.1)
Average rainfall mm (inches)	2.4 (0.09)	18.8 (0.74)	43.5 (1.71)	67.9 (2.67)	208.0 (8.19)	223.0 (8.78)	180.8 (7.12)	260.0 (10.24)	213.9 (8.42)	167.6 (6.60)	37.1 (1.46)	0.8 (0.03)	1,423.8 (56.05)
Average rainy days	0	1	4	6	15	16	17	19	17	12	3	1	111
Source: Thai Meteorological Department

== Ayutthaya city sites ==
=== Notable cultural sites ===
Name	Picture	Built	Sponsor(s)	Notes
Wat Yai Chai Mongkhon		1357	King Ramathibodi I	One of the most famous temples in Ayutthaya
Wat Mahathat		1374	King Borommaracha I	
Wat Chai Watthanaram		1630	King Prasat Thong	One of the most famous temples in Ayutthaya
Wat Phanan Choeng		1324		
Wat Phra Si Sanphet		1350	King Ramathibodi I	
Wihan Phra Mongkhon Bophit		c. 1637 (restored c. 1742/20th century, on multiple occasions)	King Chairachathirat; King Borommakot	Restored once or twice in the 18th century. Reduced to ruins after the Fall of Ayutthaya in 1767. Restored in the 20th century.
Wat Na Phra Men		1503	King Ramathibodi II	One of the best preserved temples to survive after the Fall of Ayutthaya in 1767. Restored during the reign of Rama III (r. 1824–51).
Wat Ratchaburana		1424	King Borommarachathirat II	
Wat Pradu Songtham			Under royal patronage from King Songtham (r. 1611–28) until the fall of Ayutthaya in 1767	King Uthumphon entered the monkhood at this temple following his forced abdication in 1758
Wat Lokaya Sutharam		1452	King Intharacha	
Wat Phra Ram		1369	King Ramesuan	
Wat Phutthaisawan		Before 1350	King Ramathibodi I	Built before Ayutthaya was founded
Chedi Phukhao Thong		c. 1569, 1587 (rebuilt in 1744)	King (then-Prince) Naresuan; King Borommakot	Built to commemorate a battle victory following Ayutthaya's liberation from Burma in 1584
Wat Thammikarat		Before 1350	King of Lavo	Built before Ayutthaya was founded
Wat Kudi Dao		1711 or earlier	Prince, later King Borommakot	A good example of 18th-century Late Ayutthaya wat architecture. Partially restored.

=== Museums ===
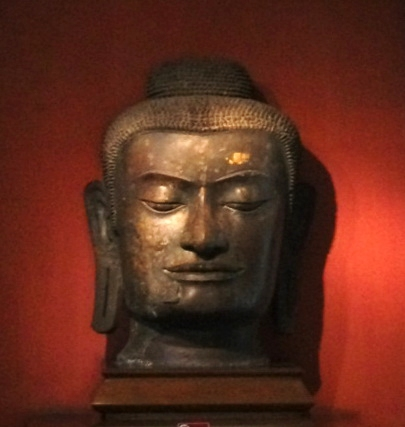
Head of the principal Buddha image from Wat Thammikarat on display at Chao Sam Phraya National Museum

- Ayutthaya Historical Study Centre: A research-oriented museum and interpretation centre focusing on the history, urban development, and archaeology of Ayutthaya. It provides background information on the Ayutthaya Kingdom and serves as an educational hub for both scholars and the general public.
- Chao Sam Phraya National Museum: A national museum established to house and display high-value artifacts excavated primarily from Wat Ratchaburana and Wat Mahathat. Its collections include Buddhist relics, gold regalia, jewellery, votive tablets, and sculptures from the Ayutthaya period, as well as later historical periods.

=== Other tourism sites ===
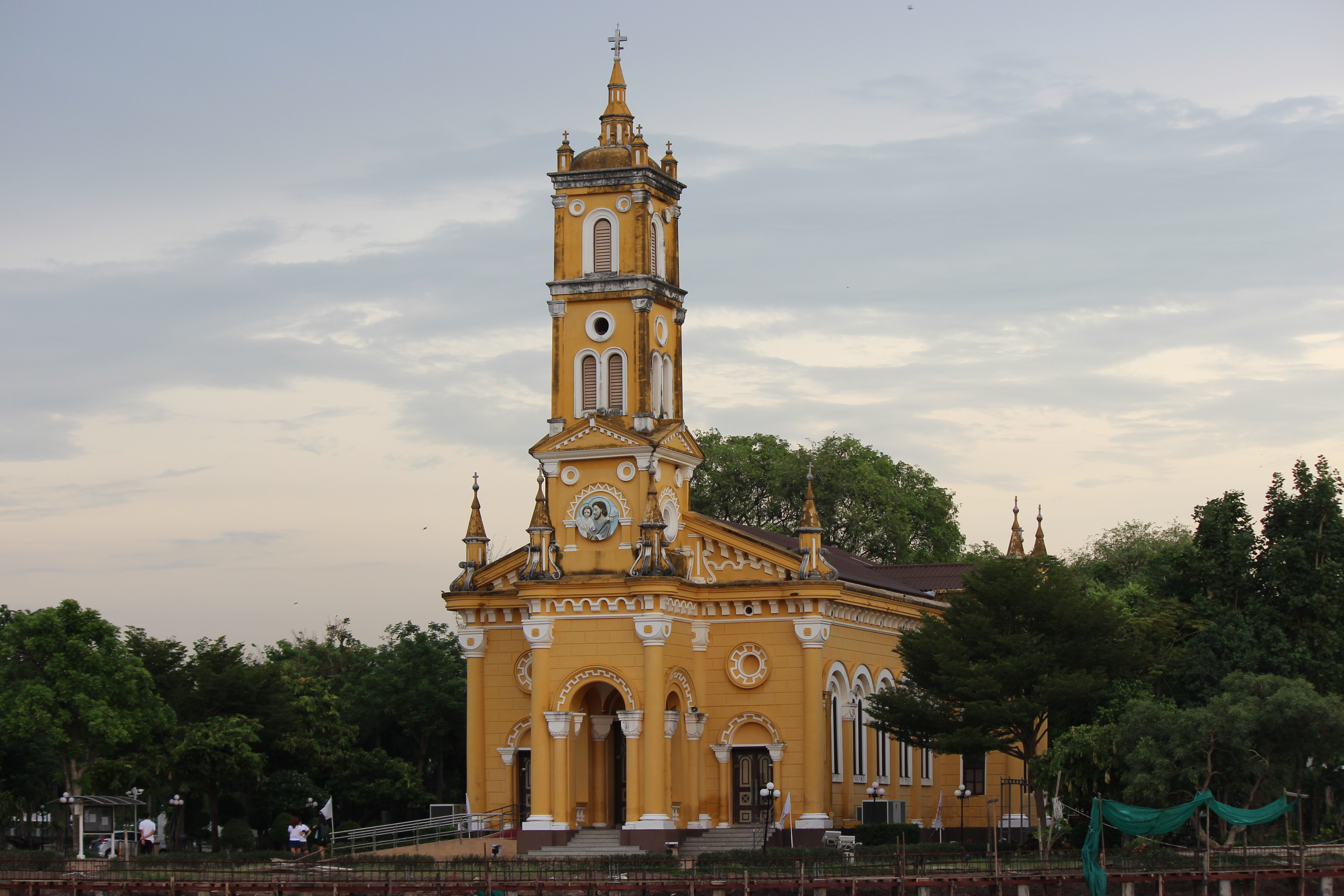
St. Joseph's Church

- Wang Luang
- Wat Suwan Dararam Ratchaworawihan
- St. Joseph's Church
- Baan Hollanda
- Japanese Village

The Ayutthaya Night Market offers a plethora of shopping opportunities, including a wide variety of food, clothing, and handicrafts. Visitors can enjoy traditional Thai dishes such as pad Thai, mango sticky rice, and tom yum soup, as well as a range of international cuisine. The market is also famous for its array of souvenirs, including handmade bags, jewelry, and textiles. Street performers, music, and colorful lights adding to the festive ambiance.

Khlong Sabua is a floating market in Ayutthaya; it is more popular with Thai tourists than foreign travellers. The main attraction is a Water Theatre featuring live performances of Thai folk tales and musicals.

== Transport ==
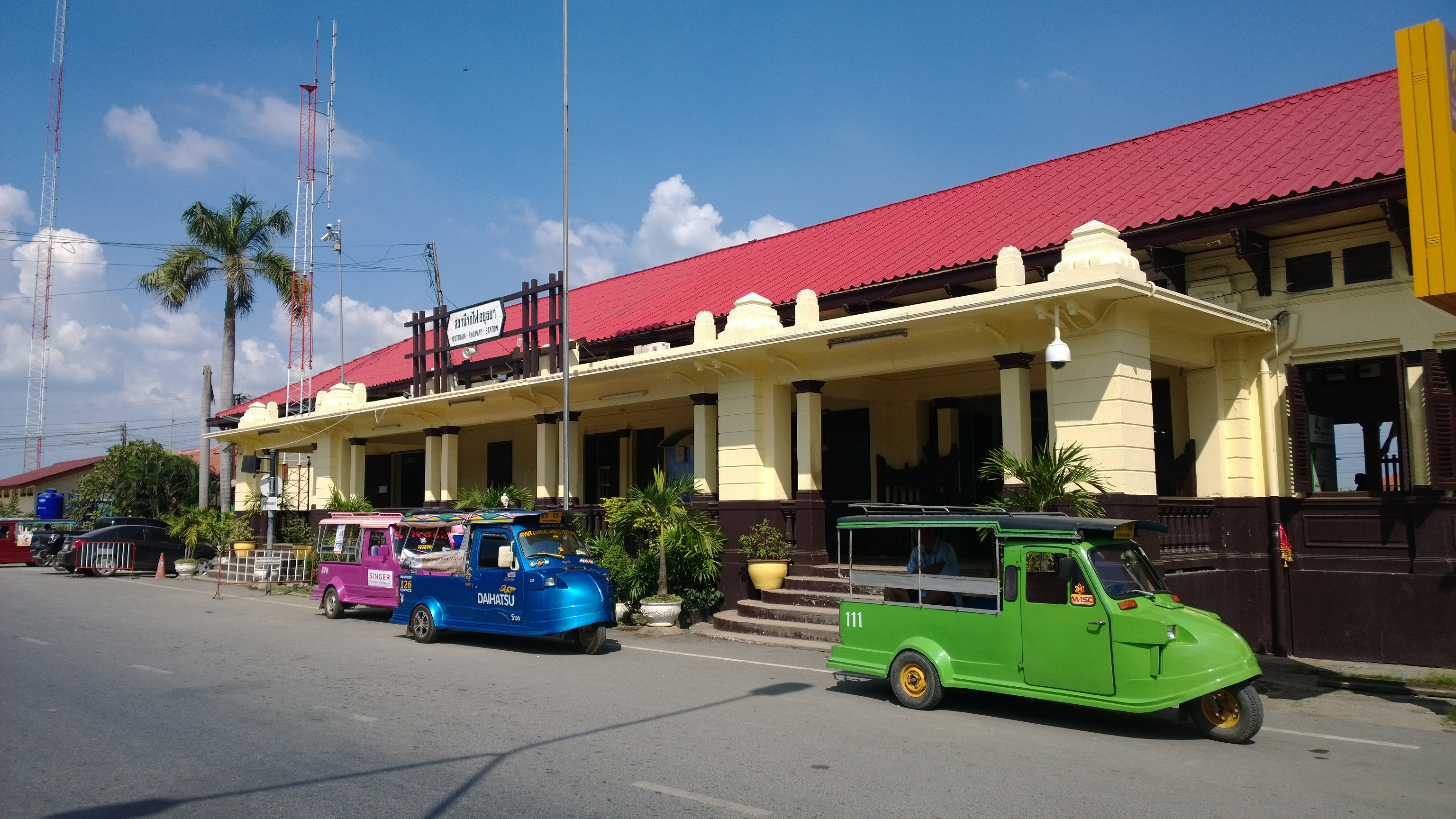
Ayutthaya railway station

Ayutthaya is accessible by air and rail.

=== Air ===
The closest airport is Bangkok's Don Mueang International Airport, a hub for regional budget carriers. An elevated walkway connects Terminal 1 to the Don Muang Train Station, where Ayutthaya-bound trains regularly roll through.

=== Rail ===
Trains to Ayutthaya leave Bangkok's Hua Lamphong Station approximately every hour between 04:20 am. and 10:00 pm. The 3rd class fare is 20 baht for the 1.5 hour trip. Train schedules are available from the information booth at Hua Lamphong Station, Bangkok.

== Government ==
The city municipality of Ayutthaya is a thesaban nakhon which covers 10 tambon in Phra Nakhon Si Ayutthaya Province. The legislative body, the Ayutthaya City Municipal Council, is composed of 24 councillors elected every four years. The executive body consists of five executives and is headed by the mayor. The current mayor of Ayutthaya city is Dr. Somsong Sappakosonlakul.

== Education ==
Ayutthaya Wittayalai School and Chomsurang Upatham School are the principal secondary schools located in Ayutthaya city.

Phranakhon Si Ayutthaya Rajabhat University and Rajamangala University of Technology Suvarnabhumi are the two universities located in the city proper.

== Culture ==
=== Literature ===
The Ayutthaya period is considered a formative era for Thai literature, characterized by the development of diverse poetic forms such as klong (Thai: โคลง), chan (Thai: ฉันท์), and lilit (Thai: ลิลิต). Early works were primarily religious or ceremonial, such as the Lilit Ongkan Chaeng Nam (Incantation of the Water of Allegiance).

The reign of King Narai (1656–1688) represented a major literary peak, during which the first Thai textbook, Chindamani (Thai: จินดามณี), was produced to formalize the language against increasing foreign influence. Other significant courtly works from this era include the epic poem Lilit Phra Lo and the development of nirat (travel poetry), which merged romantic themes with observations of journeys.

Beyond courtly literature, the period saw the emergence of popular oral traditions, most notably the epic of Khun Chang Khun Phaen. Although its modern written form was compiled later, the story originated as folk ballads (sepha) during the late Ayutthaya period, providing insights into contemporary social customs and daily life. The late Ayutthaya period under King Borommakot experienced a further resurgence of literature, focusing on Buddhist jataka tales and refined courtly poetry, and the Ramakien (the Thai version of the Ramayana), which became a foundational text for royal Khon (masked dance) performances.

=== Architecture ===
Ayutthaya architecture is generally categorized into three distinct phases. The early period (1350–1488) was heavily influenced by Khmer and Lopburi art, characterized by the prominent use of the tall prang as the principal monument of the temple complex, such as at Wat Ratchaburana.

During the middle period (1488–1629), the influence of Sukhothai architecture became more pronounced. The bell-shaped Sinhalese stupa (Thai: เจดีย์ทรงระฆัง) emerged as the dominant structure, replacing the prang as the center of the temple, most famously seen at the three iconic stupas of Wat Phra Si Sanphet.

The late period (1629–1767) is noted for the refinement of architectural proportions and the introduction of the redented stupa (a stupa with indented corners, Thai: เจดีย์ย่อมุม), which reflected a uniquely mature Ayutthayan aesthetic.

At its peak, Ayutthaya's skyline was characterized by glittering, gold-gilded spires and multi-tiered, elegantly curved roofs (Thai: ช่อฟ้า). The sheer scale and visual impact of these structures left a profound impression on foreign visitors.

Accounts from 17th-century European travelers and diplomats consistently emphasize the city's architectural wealth. Joost Schouten, an agent of the Dutch East India Company who resided in Ayutthaya in the 1630s, noted that the city was filled with hundreds of magnificent temples, gilded statues, and geometrically precise urban planning.

Later, during the reign of King Narai and King Phetracha, European envoys such as the French diplomat Alexandre, Chevalier de Chaumont and the German physician Engelbert Kaempfer recorded their astonishment at the architecture. Kaempfer noted that while the interior sizes might not match European cathedrals, the exterior beauty, marked by sweeping multi-layered roofs and countless golden spires, was unparalleled in Asia. The royal palaces, too, were heavily adorned with gold leaf, reflecting the kingdom's immense prosperity before its fall.

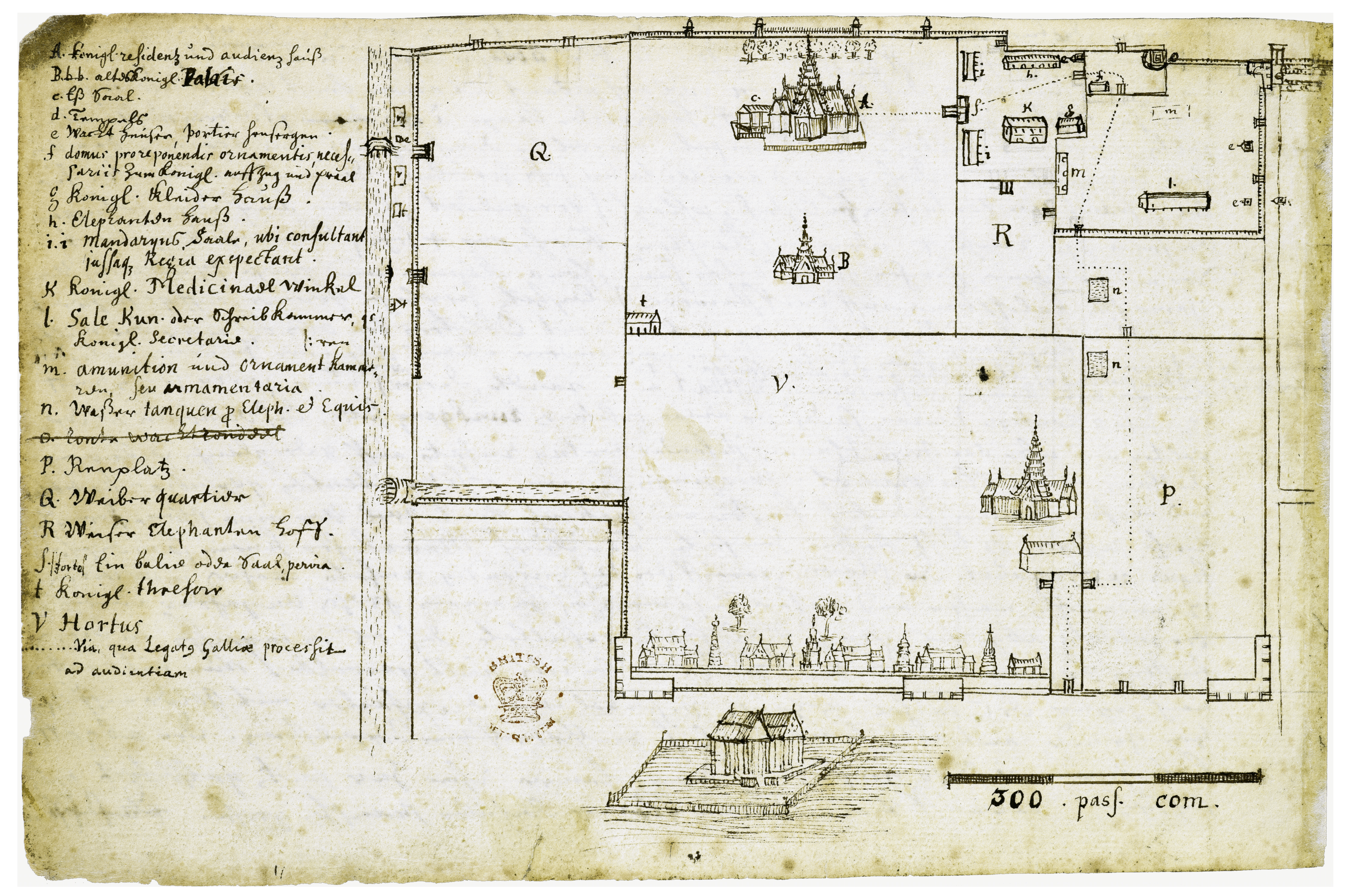
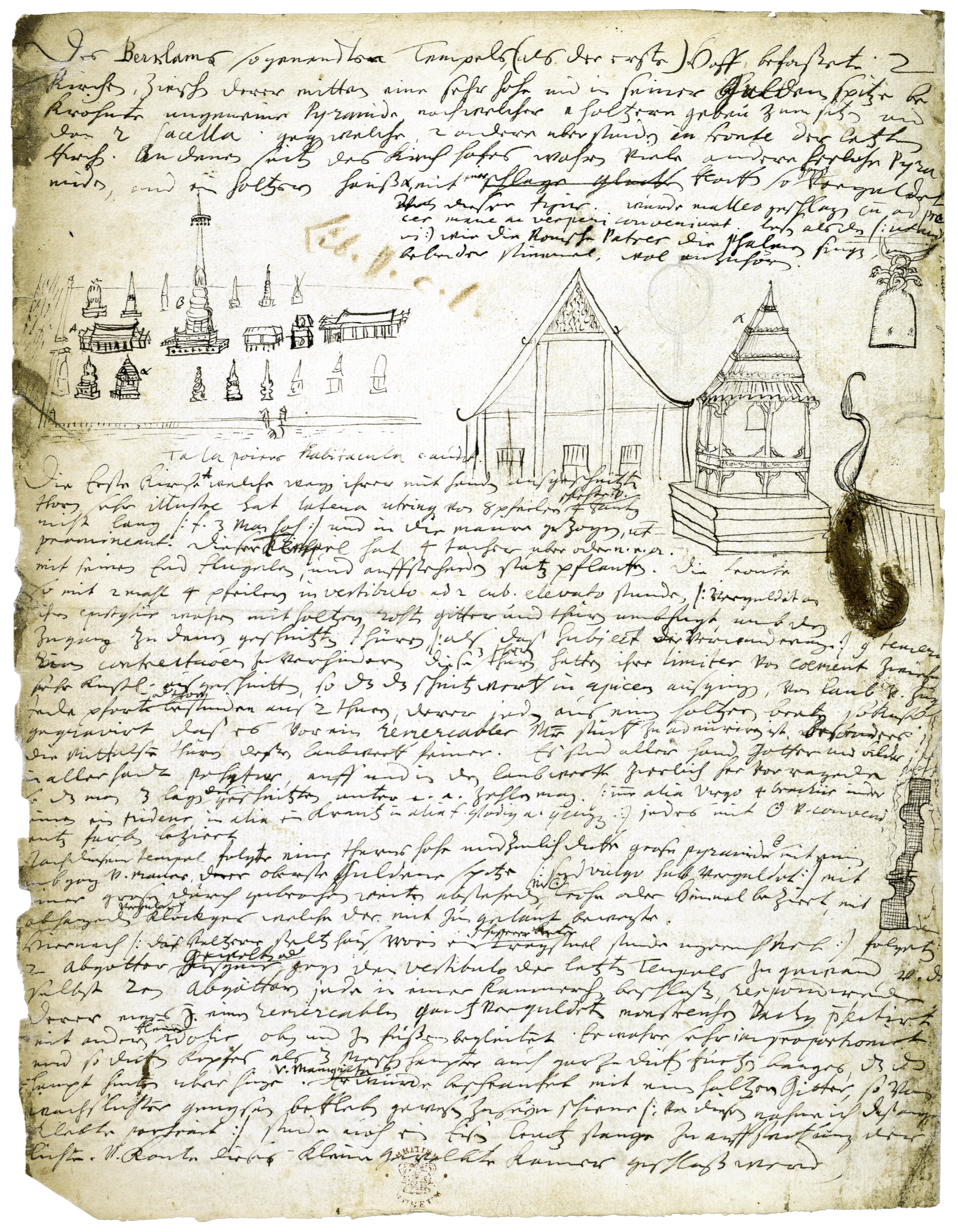
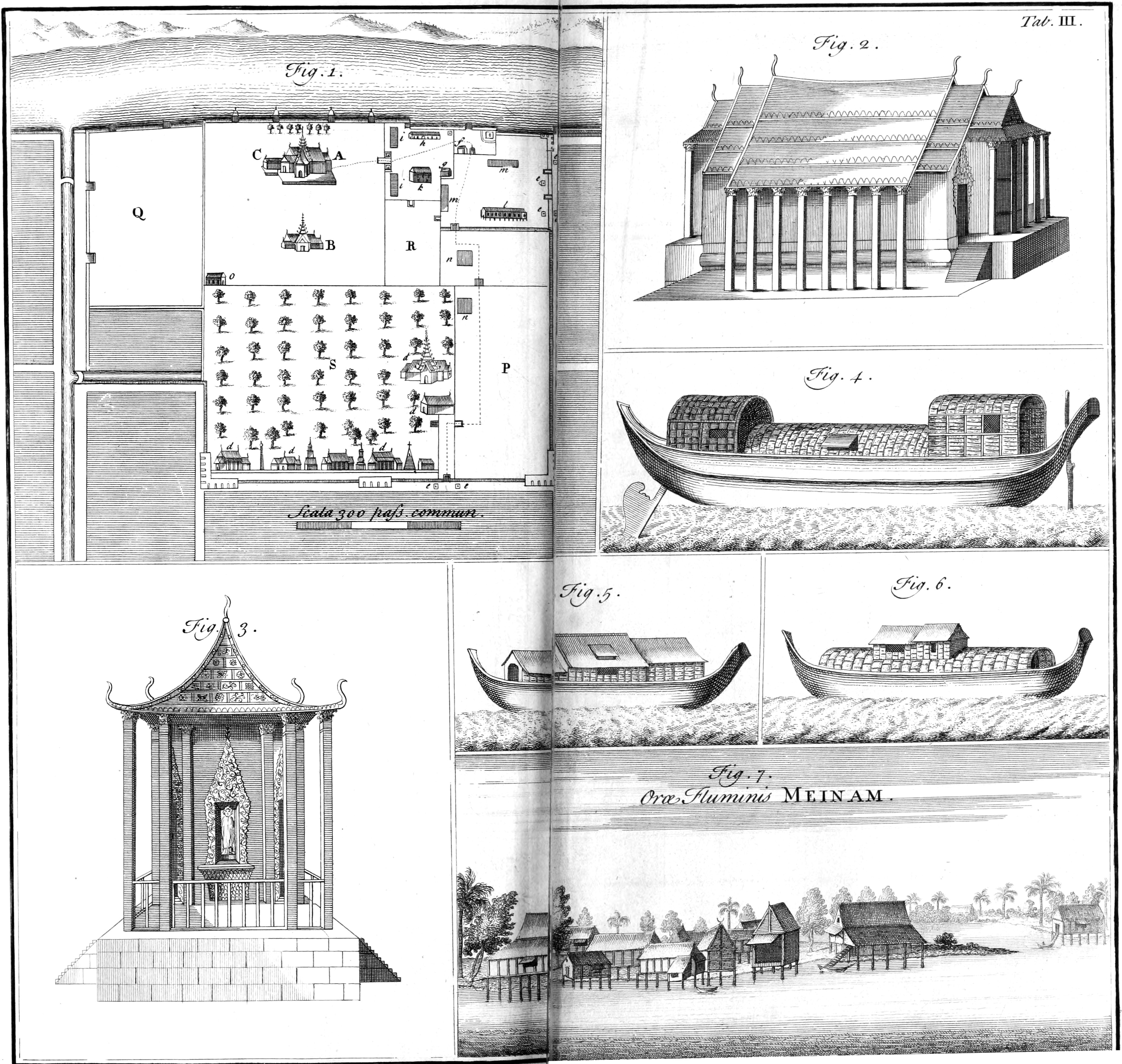
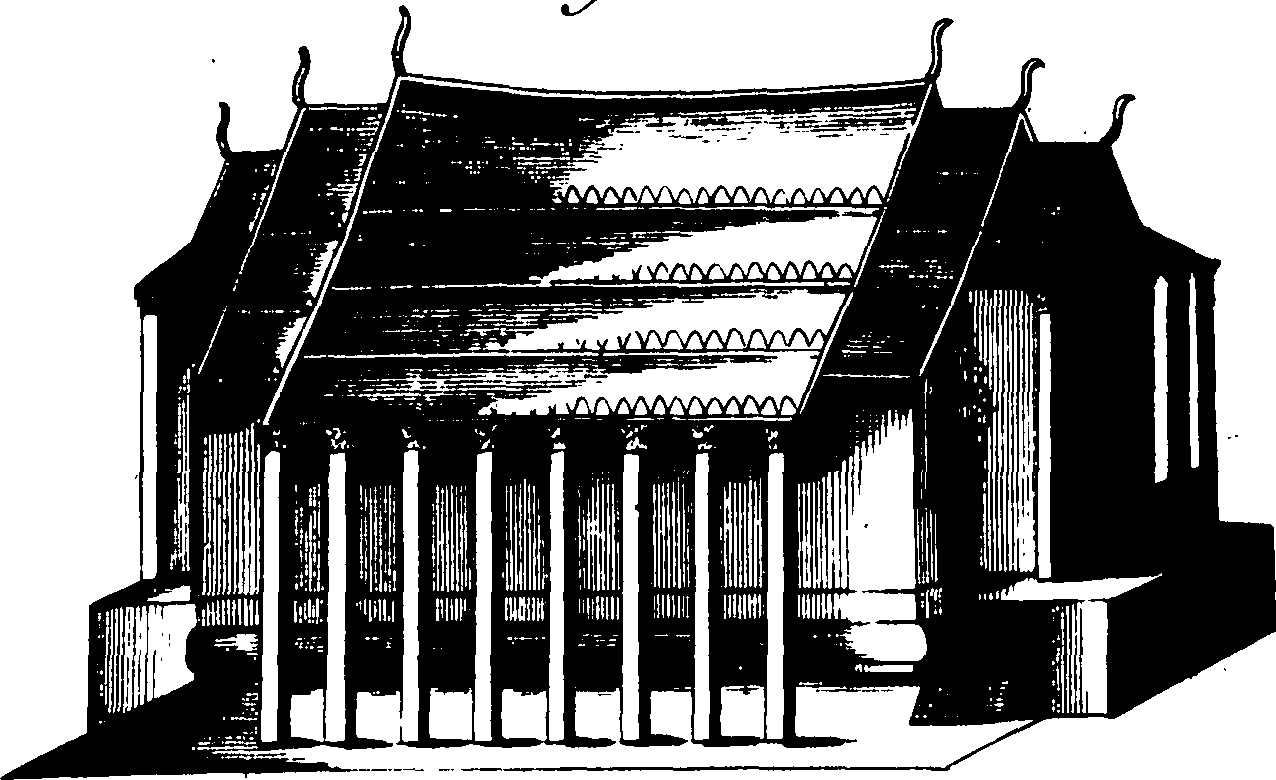
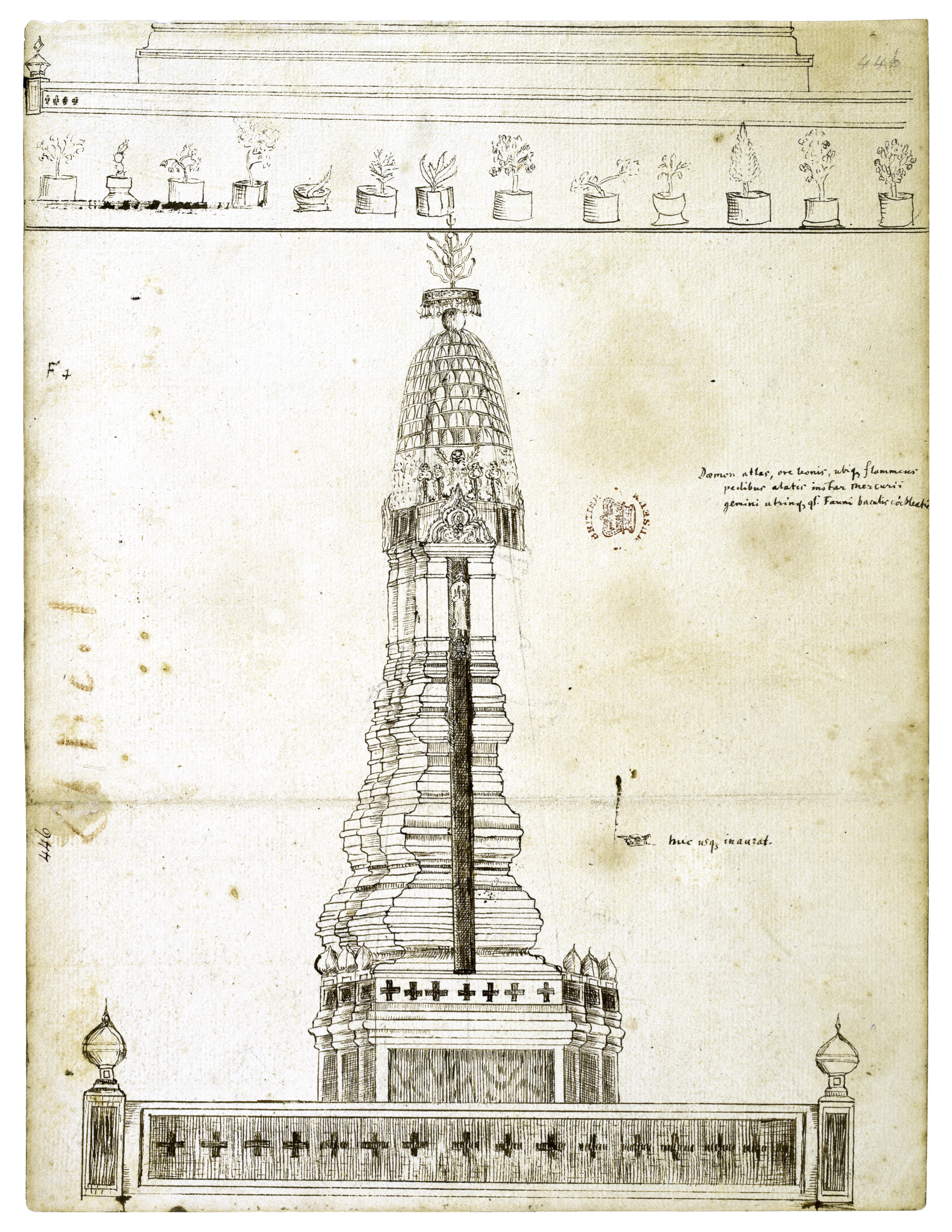
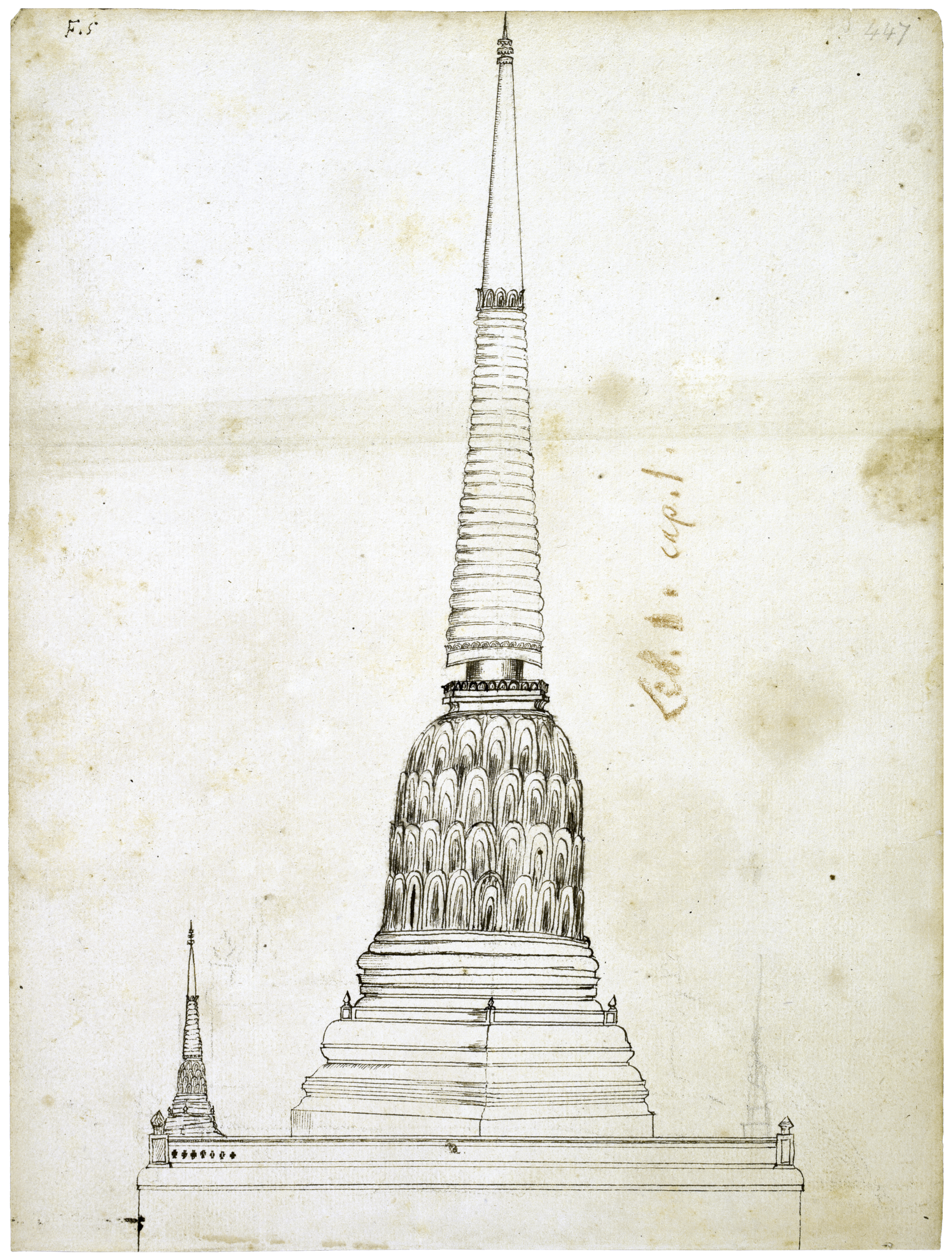
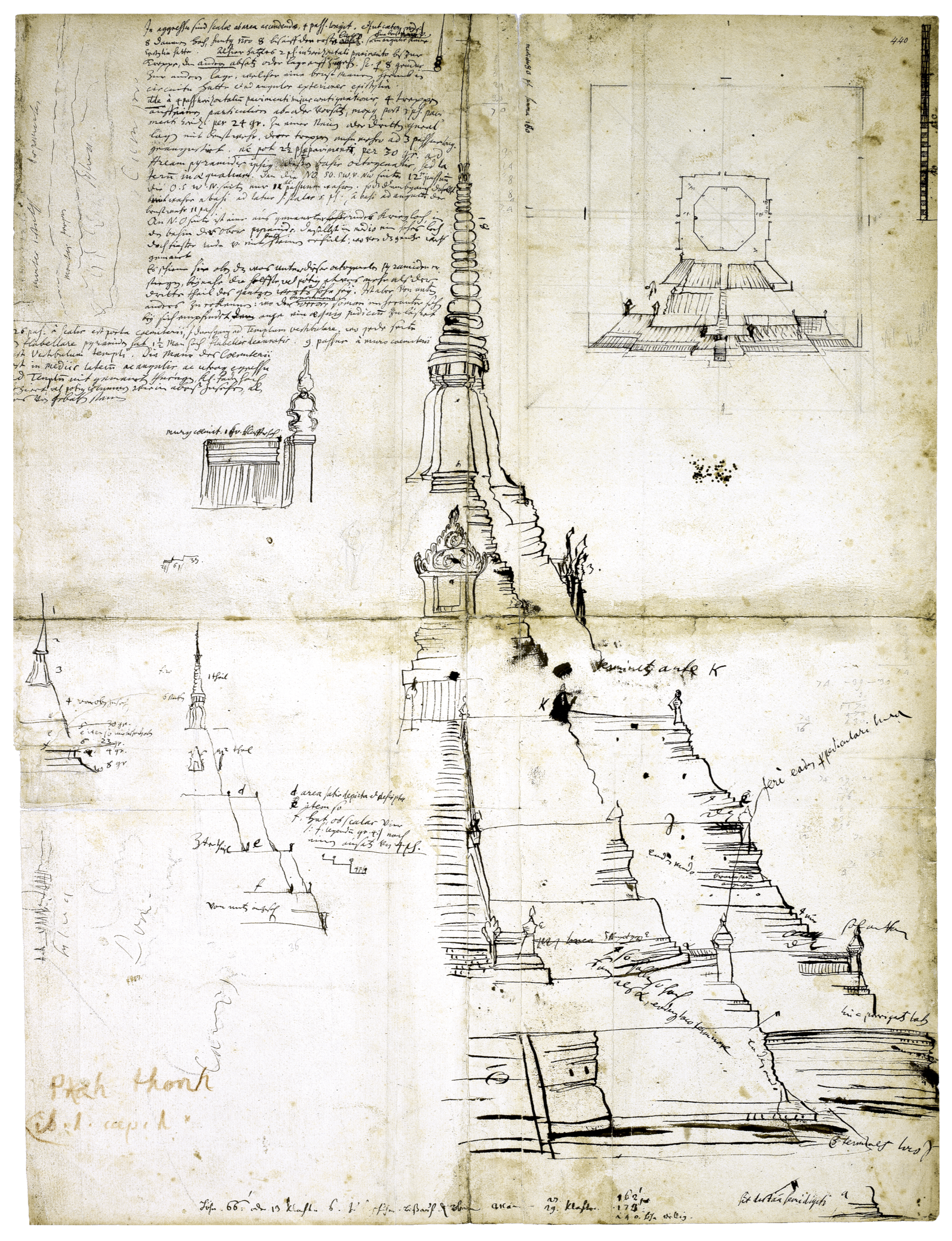
Architectural sketches and city plans of Ayutthaya by Engelbert Kaempfer (1690), illustrating the late Ayutthaya period's urban layout and religious monuments.

=== In fiction ===
- A Thailand-themed town named "Ayothaya" appears in the personal computer MMORPG Ragnarok Online.
- Ayutthaya is a stage in Soul Calibur II.
- The temples in Wat Phra Si Sanphet and Wat Ratchaburana from Ayutthaya appear in Street Fighter II, Kickboxer (as "Stone City"), Mortal Kombat, Mortal Kombat Annihilation, and throughout Mortal Kombat Conquest.
- The lying Buddha statue from the Ayutthaya ruins appears in Sagat's stage in most of the Street Fighter games.
- It was featured in the 2005 movie "The King Maker".
- The 1630 destruction of the Japanese quarter of Ayutthaya at the orders of Prasat Thong and its consequences is central to one of the stories in the 1632 series anthology Ring of Fire III, "All God's Children in the Burning East" by Garrett W. Vance.
- In the 2010 Nintendo DS game Golden Sun: Dark Dawn, the main characters visit the city of 'Ayuthay', which draws heavily on Thai culture and architecture.
- A Thailand-themed map named "Ayutthaya" appears in the video game Overwatch.
- Ayutthaya was featured in the 2016 video game Civilization VI as a non-playable city-state, boosting culture point generation in whichever civilization it is currently allied with.

== Notable people ==
- Taksin the Great (1734–1782), reunifier of Siam and founder of the Thonburi Kingdom
- Rama I (1737–1809), founder of Bangkok and the Rattanakosin Kingdom
- Pridi Banomyong (1900–1983), revolutionary and the 7th prime minister of Thailand
- Thawan Thamrongnawasawat (1901–1988), 8th prime minister of Thailand
- Maria Guyomar de Pinha (1664–1728), palace cook known for introduction of Portuguese-Siamese cuisine
- Constantine Phaulkon (1647–1688), Greek adventurer who became a politician in the city
- Narongnoi Kiatbandit, Muay Thai fighter
- Surasak Phancharoenworrakul, current Minister of Tourism and Sports of Thailand

== Gallery ==
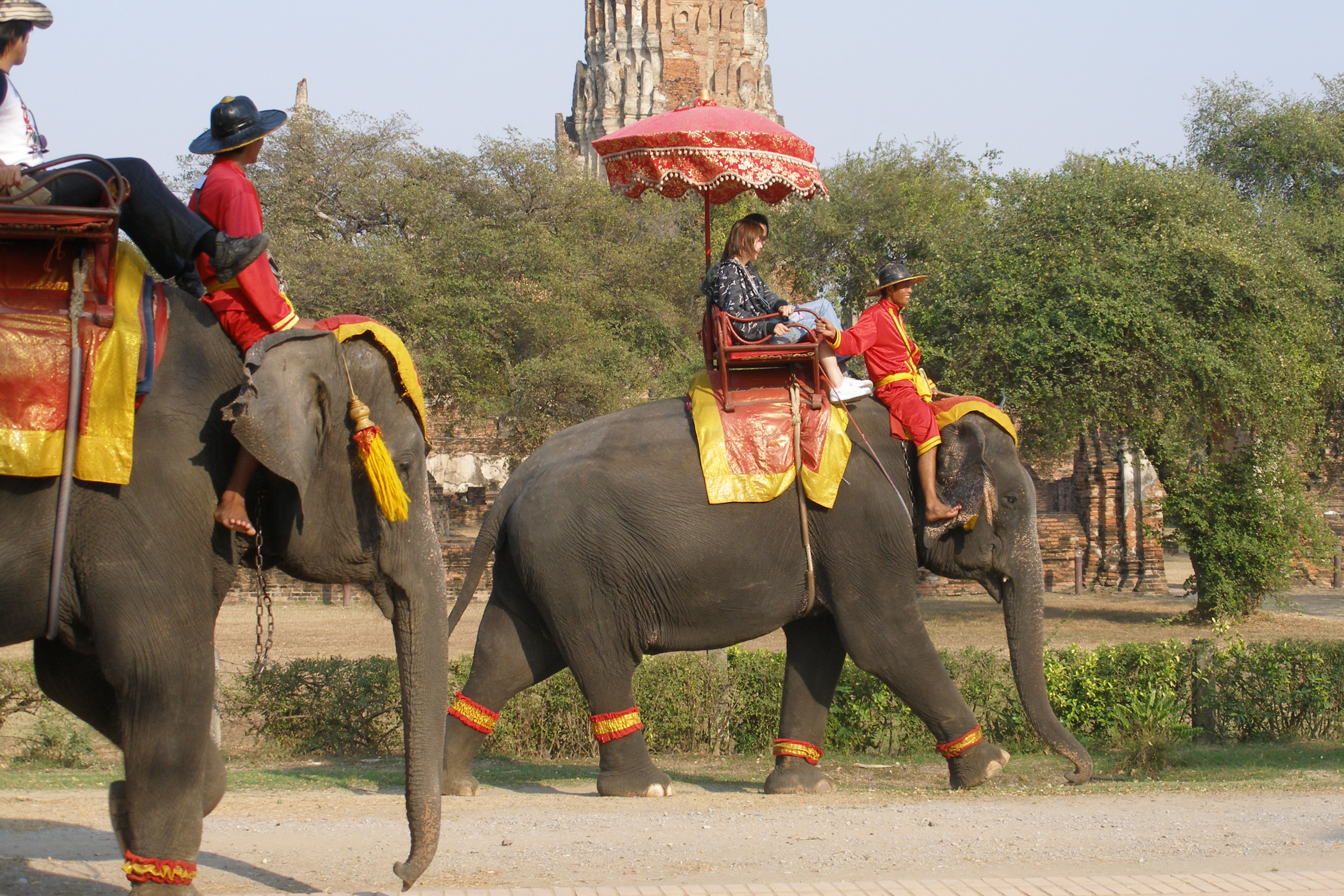
Elephants

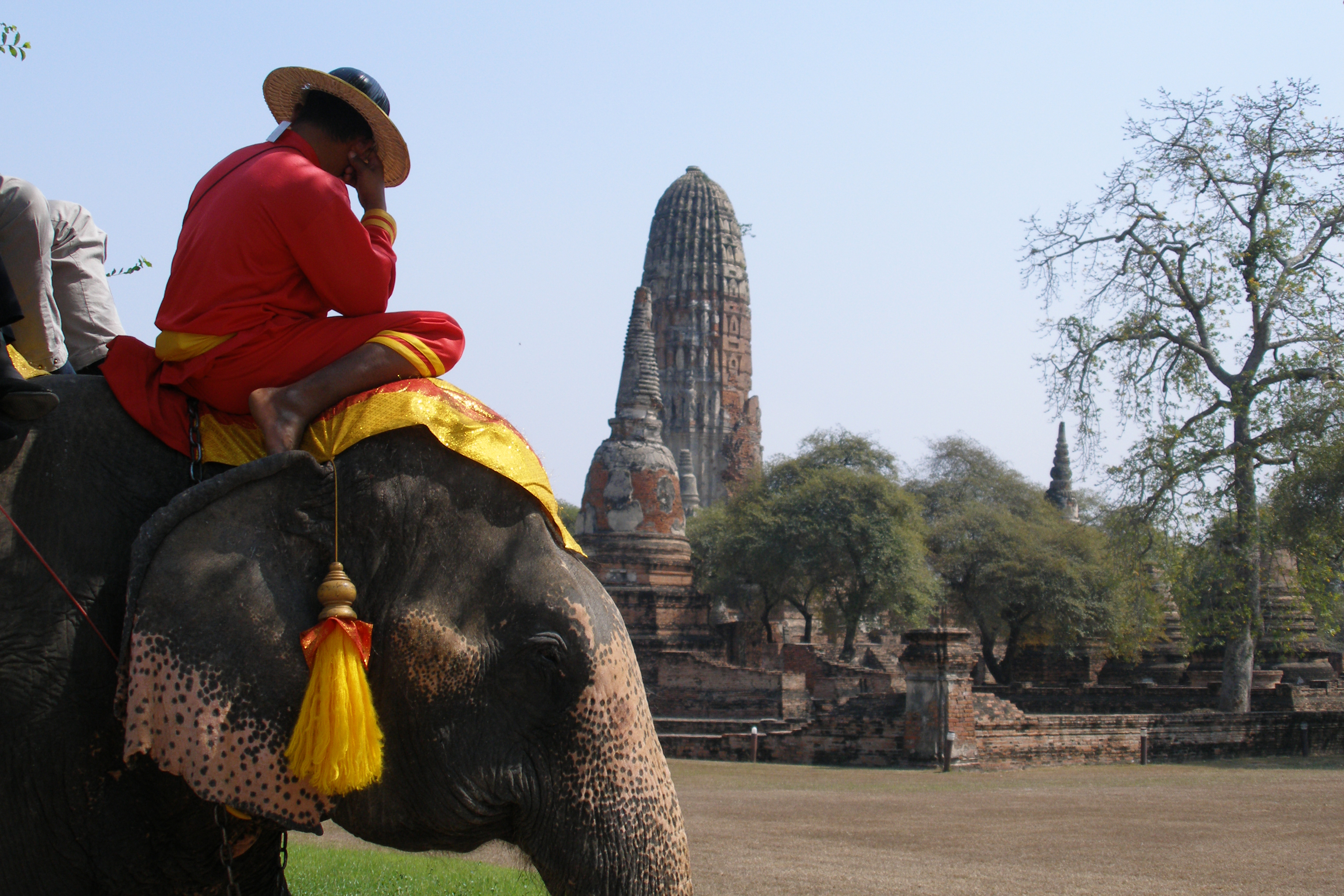
Elephant

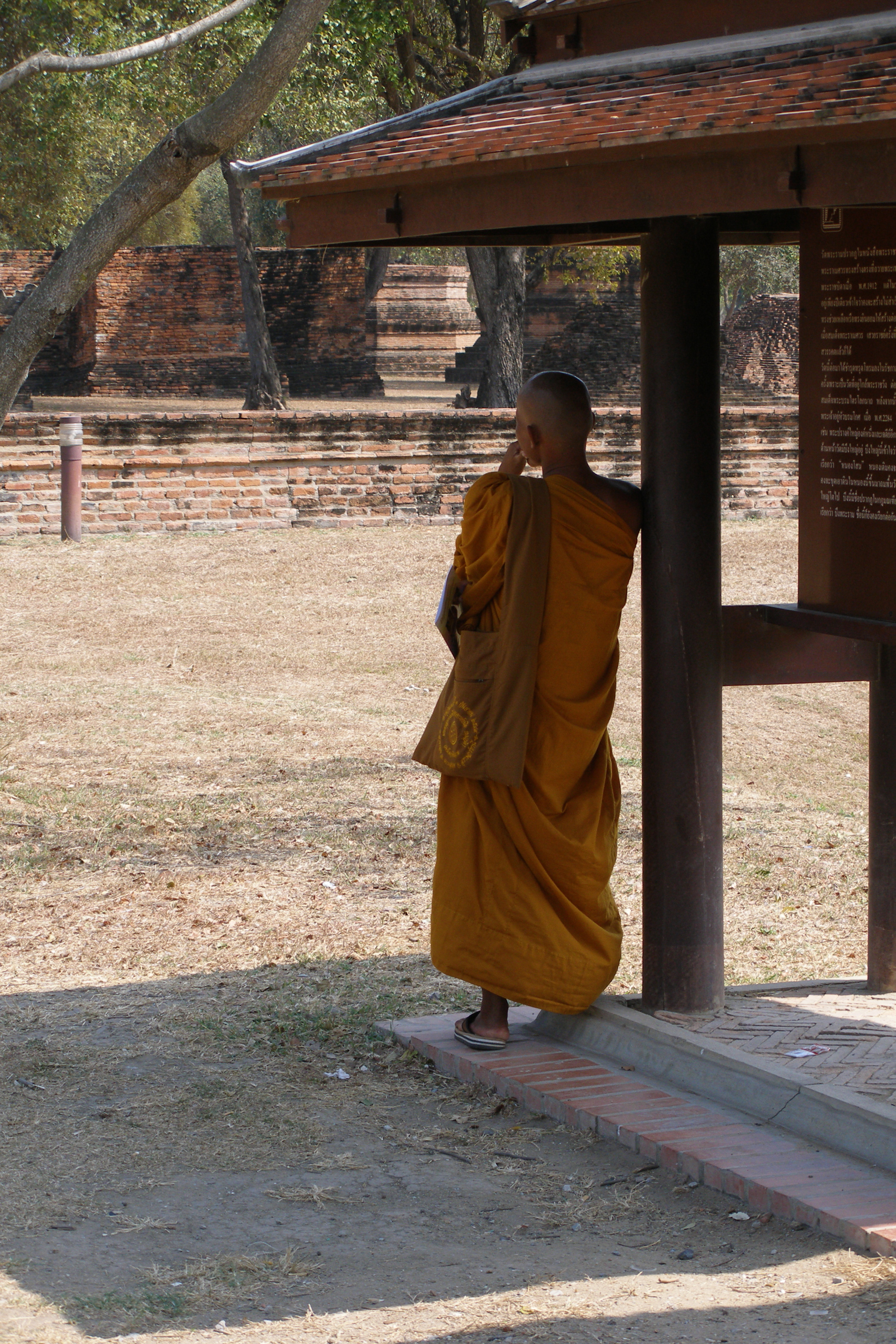
Buddhist monk in Ayutthaya

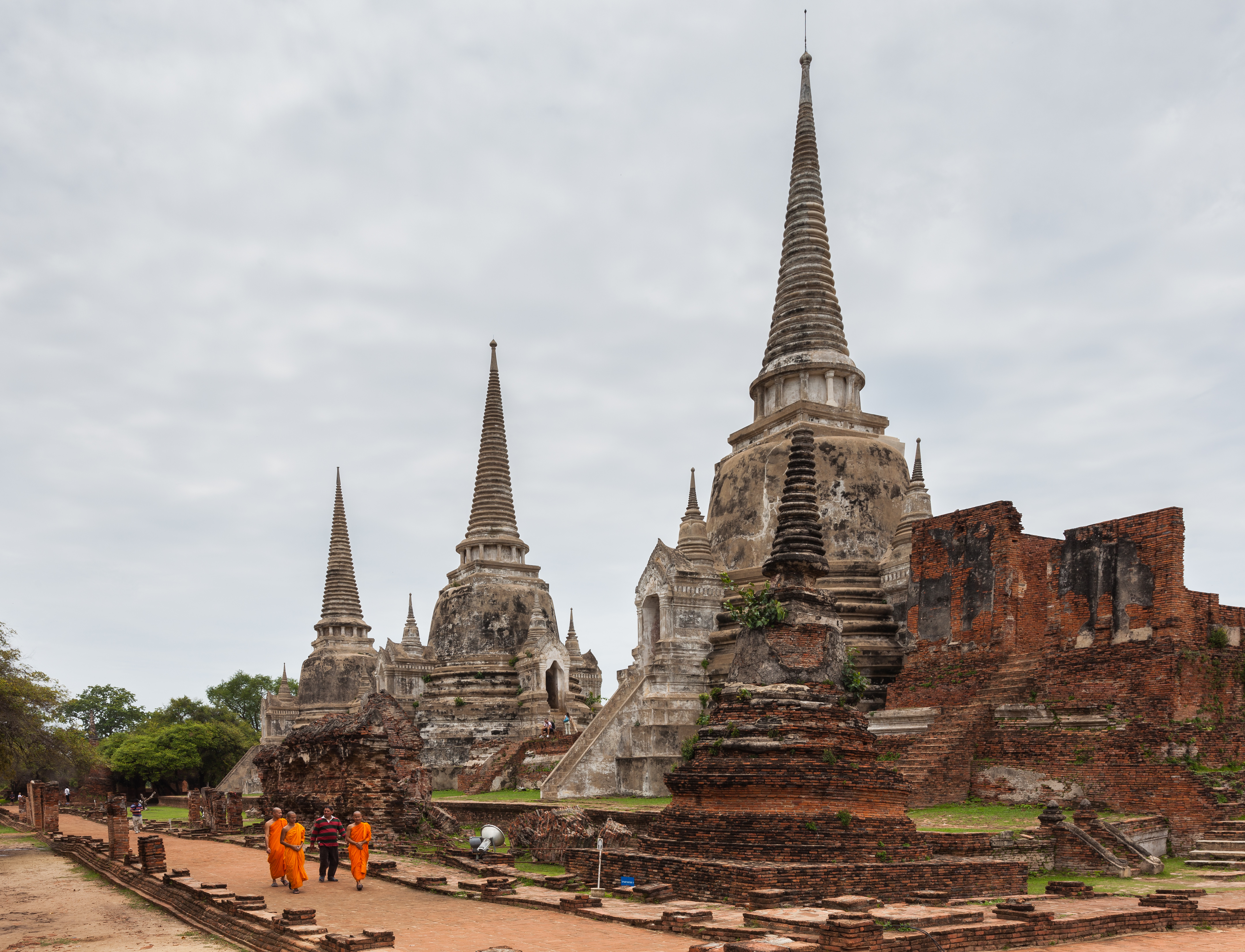
Wat Phra Si Sanphet

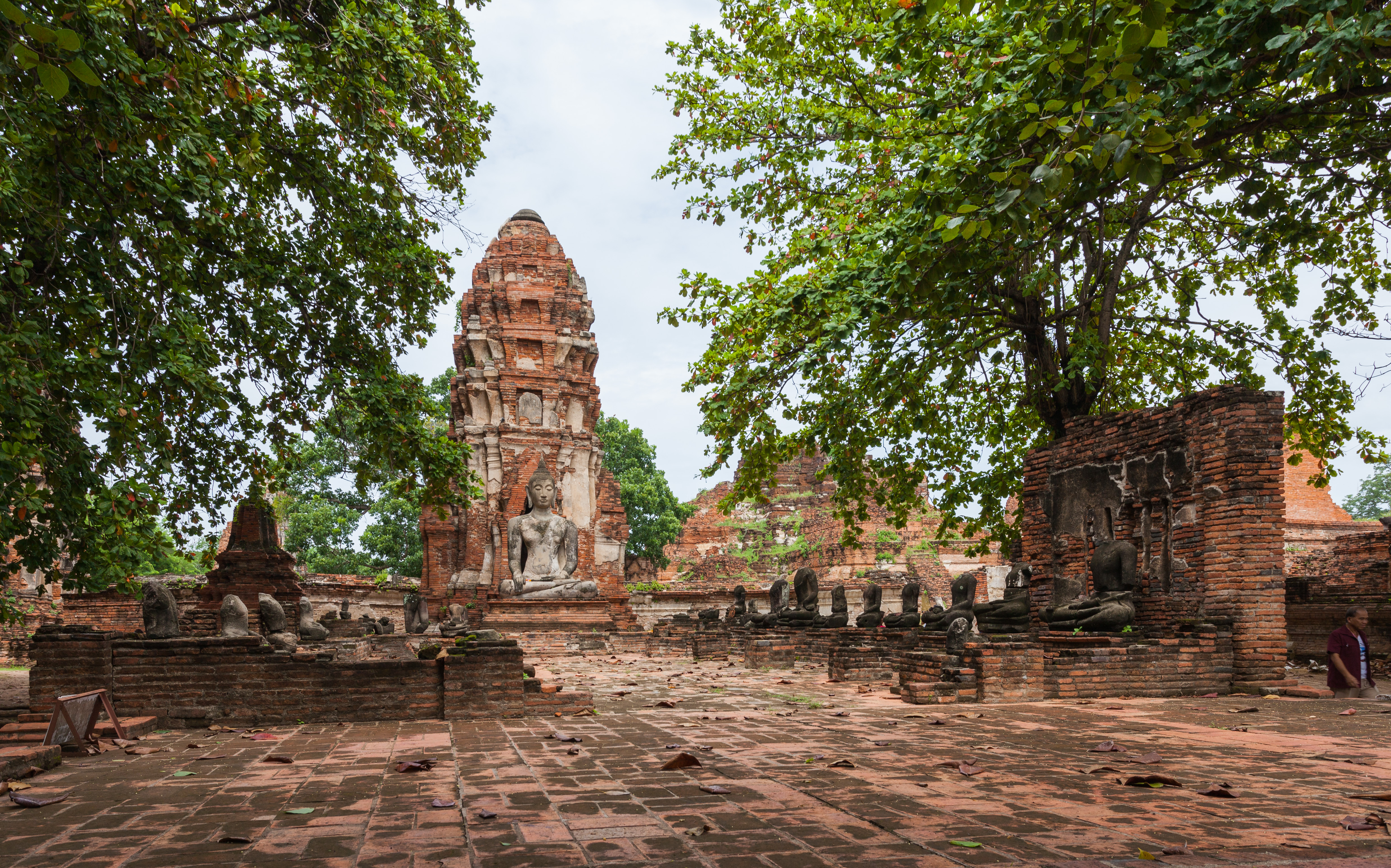
Mahathat, Ayutthaya historical park

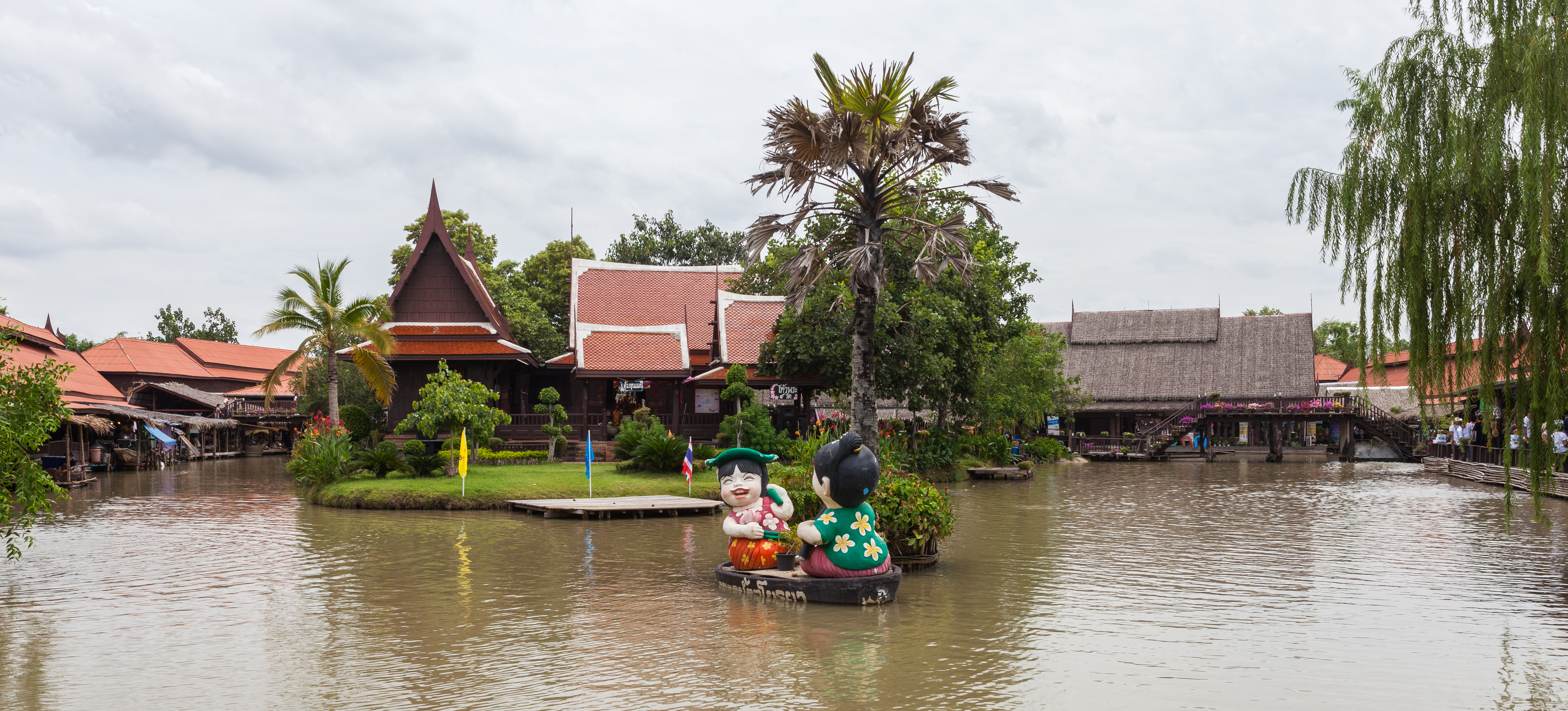
Floating market of Ayutthaya

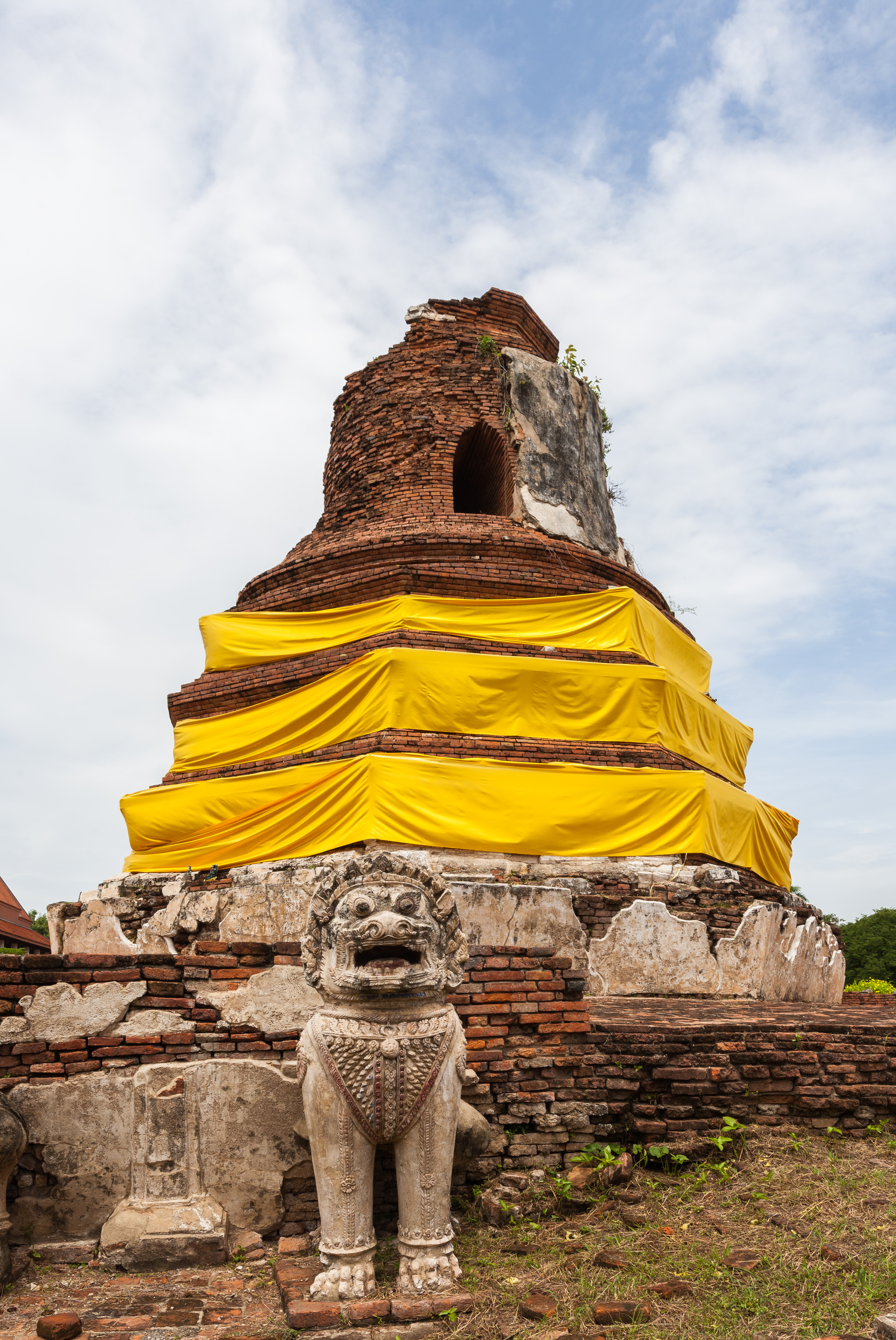
Thammikarat temple

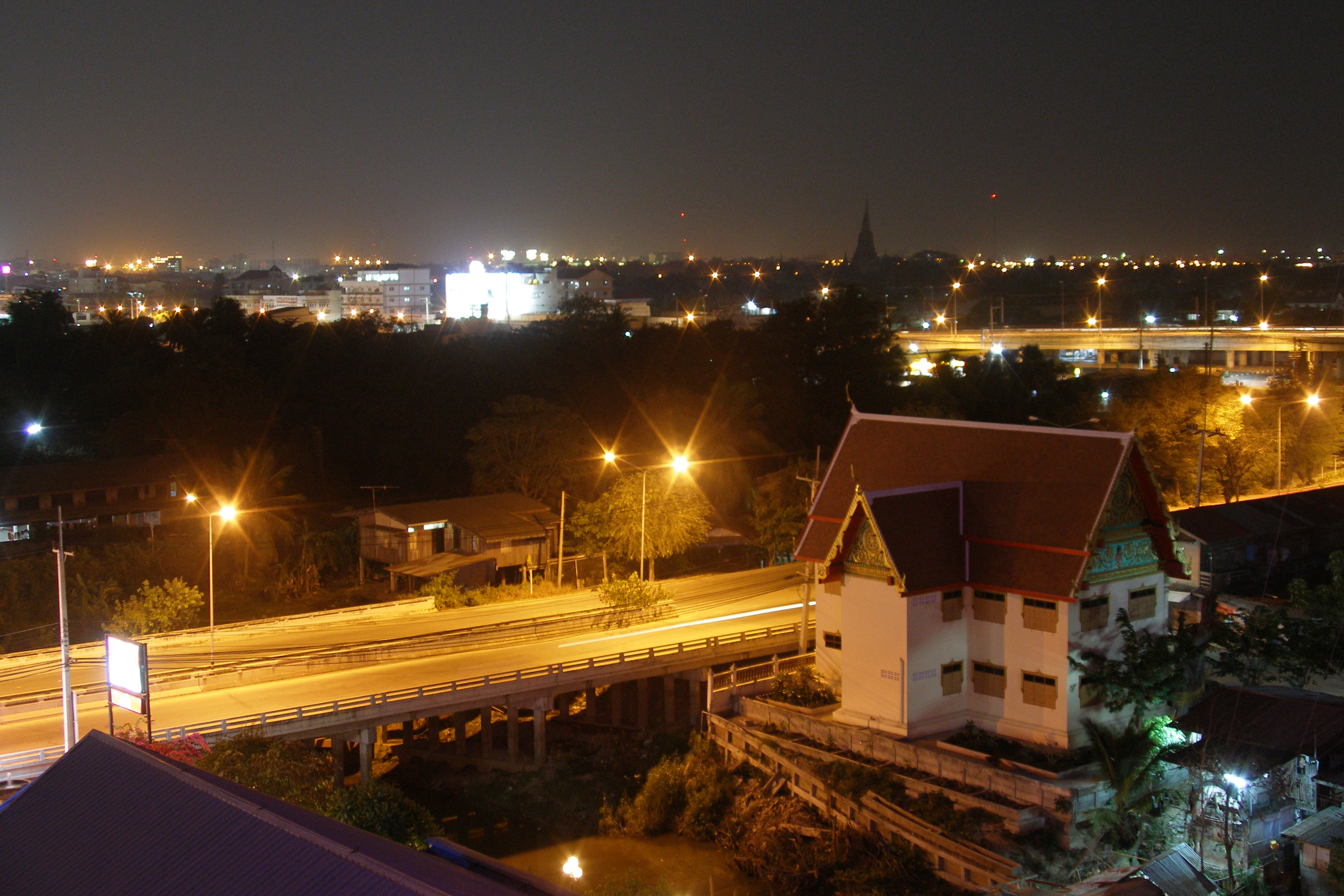
Ayutthaya city centre at night

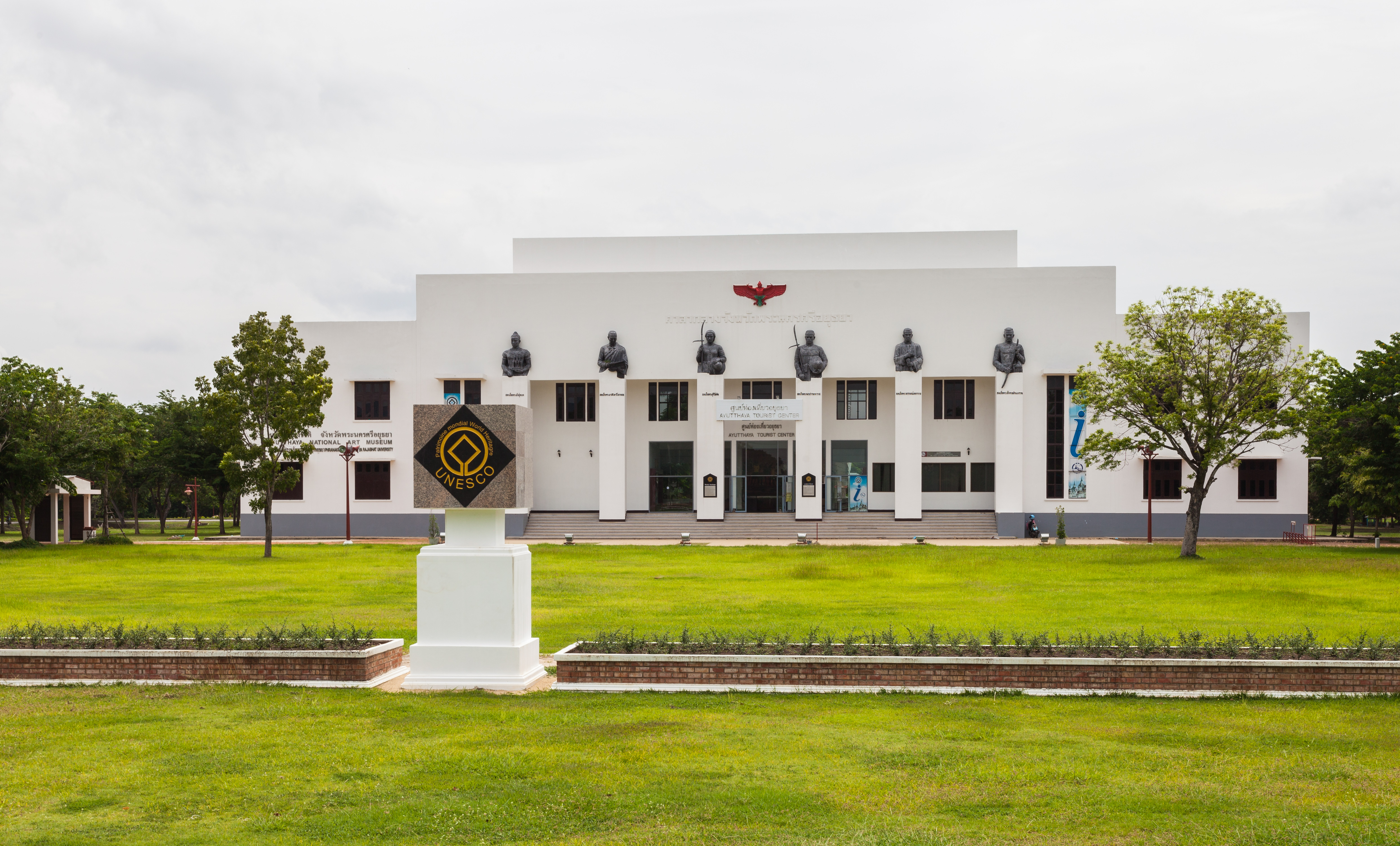
Ayutthaya Tourist Center

== Notes ==
^{a} The city was founded on Friday, the 6th day of the waxing moon of the 5th month, 1893 Buddhist Era, corresponding to Friday, 4 March 1351 Common Era, according to the calculation of the Fine Arts Department of Thailand.

== See also ==
- Ayutthaya Historical Park
