= Pom Phet =

Fortification in Thailand

Coordinates: 14.346198°N 100.576526°E

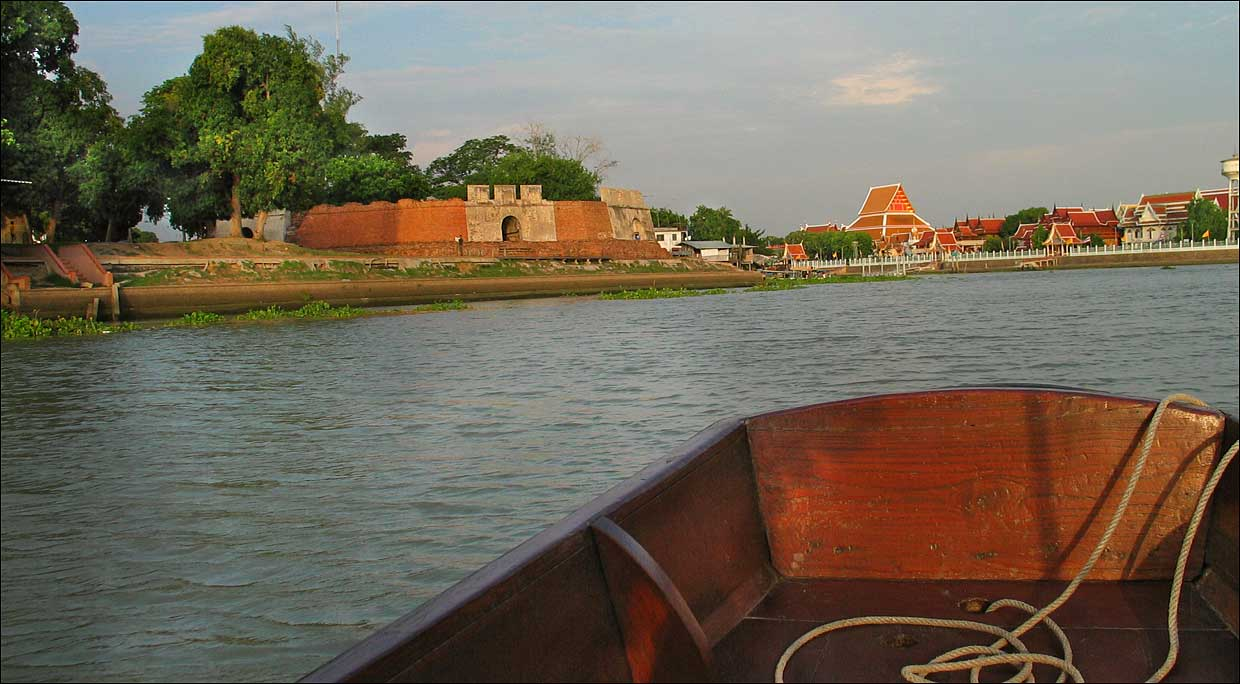
Pom Phet as seen from the Chao Phraya River

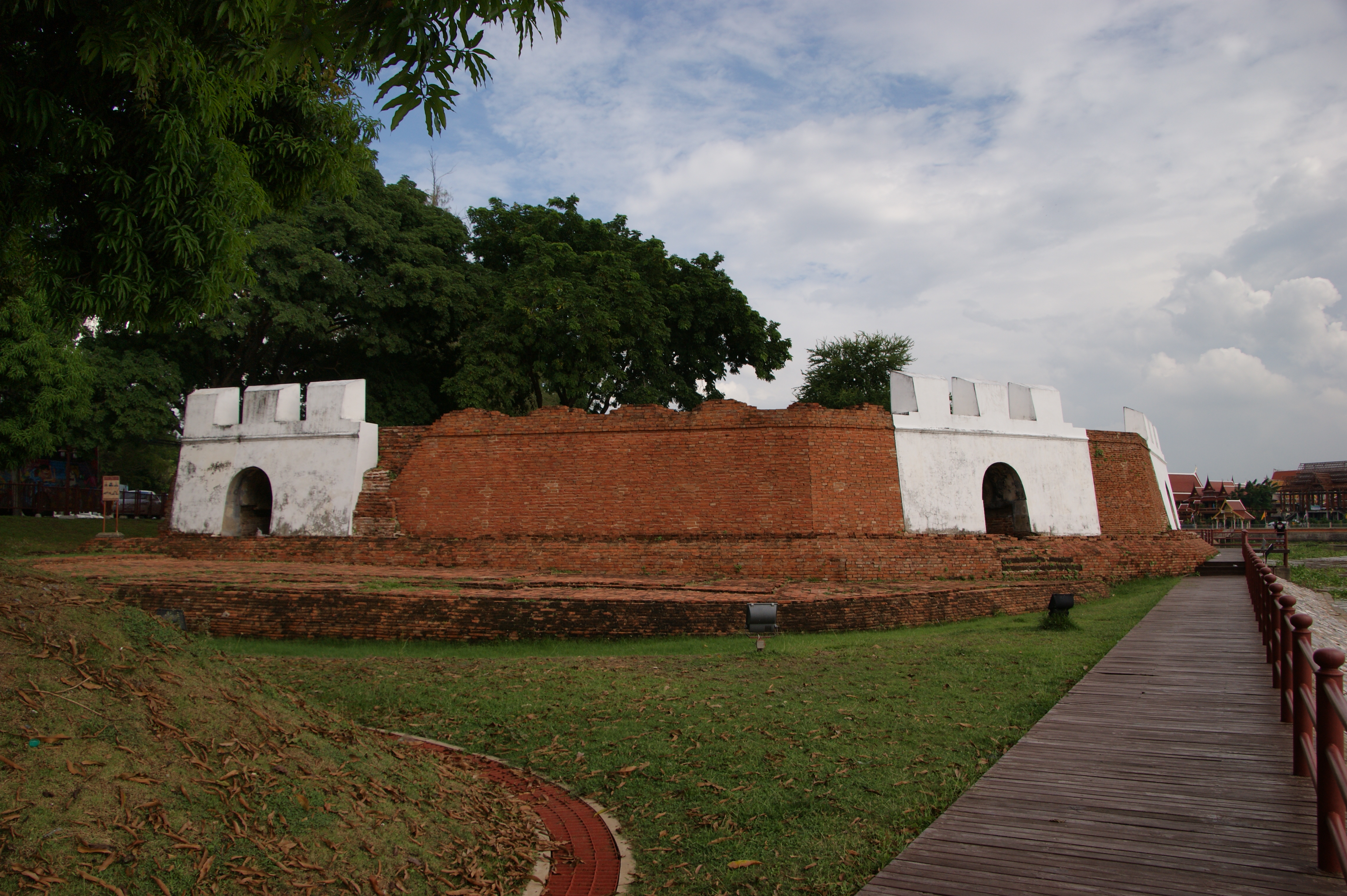
The fort outside

Pom Phet (Thai: ป้อมเพชร, pronounced [pɔ̂m pʰét]) is a historic fort along the city walls of Ayutthaya, in Phra Nakhon Si Ayutthaya, Thailand. It is one of only two surviving fortresses of Ayutthaya's 29 forts.

The fort was built during the reign of King Maha Chakkraphat in the middle Ayutthaya period, after the first great war between Ayutthaya and Burma (Burmese–Siamese War; 1547–1549). Pom Phet is considered the strongest and most important fort, hence the name "Pom Phet" (literally: "diamond fort"). It is located at the point where the Pa Sak River joins the Chao Phraya and the Lop Buri Rivers (now the Chao Phraya River) known as Bang Kaja (บางกะจะ, pronounced [bāːŋ kā.t͡ɕā]).

It was made of brick and laterite, built 14 m (45.9 ft) thick, with a boundary marker 6.50 m (21.3 ft) high, and 8 openings for cannons.

In the Ayutthaya period, the area around the fort included a significant trading centre where people of different nationalities resided. One person who used to live in this quarter was Thongdi, a Mon nobleman who was the father of King Rama I, the founder of Rattanakosin Kingdom and the first monarch of Chakri dynasty.

The fort's location has now been renovated into a waterfront public park. It is located in the southeast part of Ayutthaya island close to Wat Phanan Choeng on the opposite bank of the Chao Phraya River; and is considered one of the important archaeological sites and a historical attraction.

Moreover, its name was also given as the surname "Na Pombejra" by King Rama VI to a nobleman whose ancestors settled at Pom Phet. He was the origin of Na Pombejra family. Family members who are public figures include Poonsuk Banomyong (née Na Pombejra), the wife of late Senior Statesman and Thai Prime Minister Pridi Banomyong, and Potjaman Na Pombejra, the ex-wife of former Thai Prime Minister Thaksin Shinawatra.

== See more ==
- Ayutthaya Historical Park
