= Wat Ratchaburana, Ayutthaya =

Buddhist temple in Ayutthaya Historical Park, Thailand

Wat Ratchaburana
- วัดราชบูรณะ (จังหวัดพระนครศรีอยุธยา)
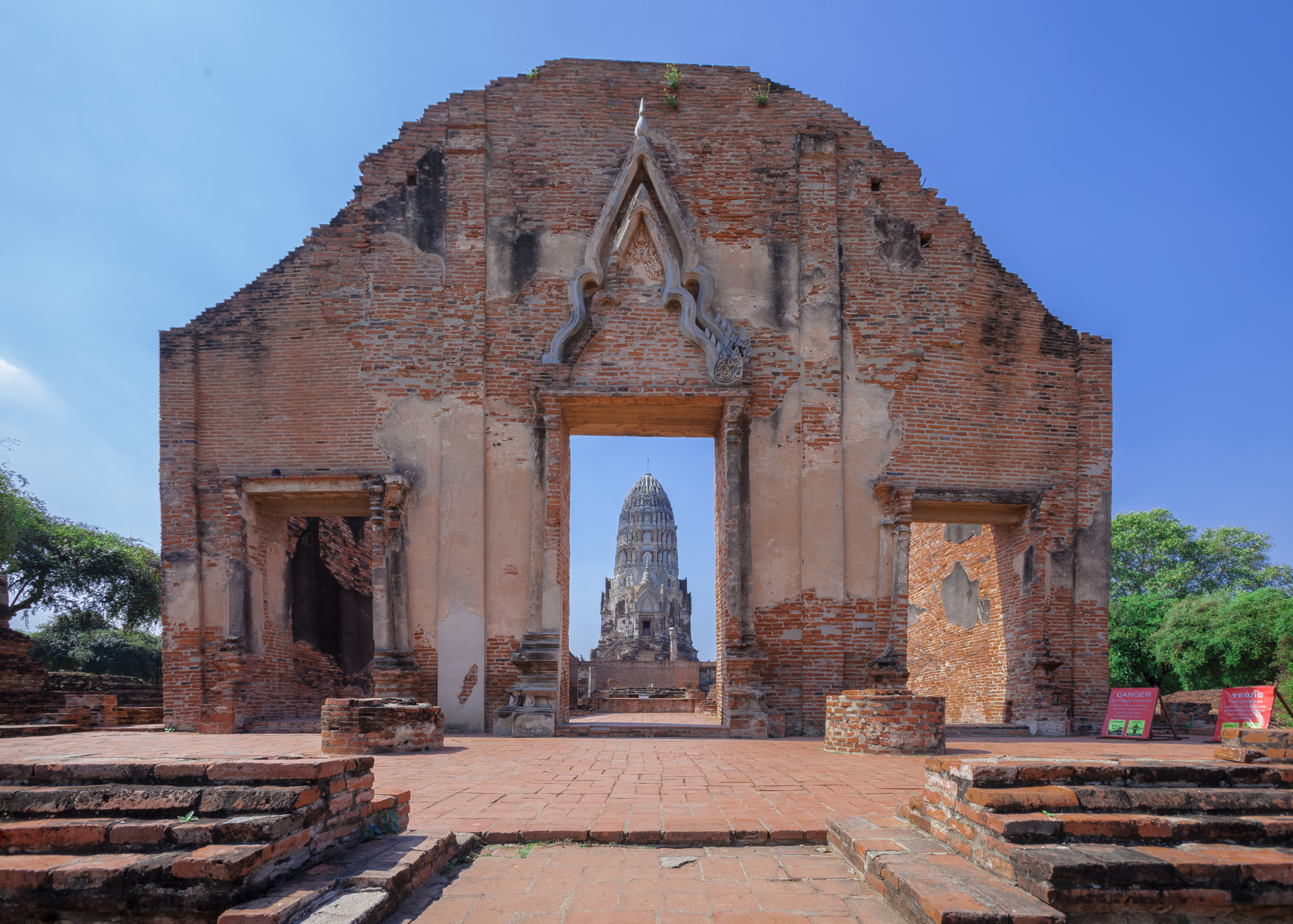
- Entrance of Wat Ratchaburana

- Location in Thailand

Religion
- Affiliation: Theravada Buddhism

Location
- Location: Ayutthaya, Ayutthaya Province
- Country: Thailand
- Coordinates: 14°21′32″N 100°34′4″E

Architecture
- Founder: Borommarachathirat II
- Completed: 1424
- UNESCO World Heritage Site
- Official name: Historic City of Ayutthaya
- Type: Cultural
- Criteria: iii
- Designated: 1991
- Parent listing: Historic City of Ayutthaya
- Reference no.: 576
- Region: Asia and the Pacific

Wat Ratchaburana (Thai: วัดราชบูรณะ) is a Buddhist temple (wat) in the Ayutthaya Historical Park, Ayutthaya, Thailand. The temple's main prang is one of the finest in the city. Located in the island section of Ayutthaya, Wat Ratchaburana is immediately north of Wat Mahathat.

== History ==
According to official Thai historiography, which is based on the research of the Royal Chronicles of Ayutthaya by Prince Damrong Rajanubhab, Wat Ratchaburana was founded in 1424 by King Borommarachathirat II of the Ayutthaya Kingdom to house the ashes of his elder brothers, Chao Ai Phraya and Chao Yi Phraya, who had previously killed each other in an elephant duel for the throne after the death their father King Intha Racha. The temple's name can be translated as "Royal Fulfillment."

Wat Ratchaburana was severely damaged by the floods of autumn 2011, as the water remained approximately one meter deep in large parts of the Ayutthaya Historical Park for several weeks. From December 2011 to 2013 a restoration project jointly conducted by the Thai Department of Fine Arts and the“German Wat Ratchaburana Safeguarding Project” (GRASP) , which included the Cologne University of Applied Sciences, Institute for Restoration and Conservation Science (CICS) conserved the delicate stucco and plaster decorations and conducted emergency stabilization measures on building foundations.

== Architecture and art ==
The design of the temple is derived from the Khmer prasat of earlier periods but is loftier with a higher base and a taller central tower. The central prang is anchored at the four corners by tapering chedi, all of which have survived. This ensemble (the tower and the four chedis) is a representation of Mount Meru, the world-mountain at the center of the Buddhist cosmos.

The ruin of a cloister encircles the central tower and the four chedi. To the east is a long, narrow building that served as the primary viharn (assembly hall). Its counterpart to the west was the monastery's ubosot, or ordination hall. A number of satellite chedi and smaller viharns are scattered about the grounds in varying states of ruins.

The temple's centraprang]] has undergone restoration. Original stucco work can be seen, for example Garuda swooping down on nāga. Other mythical creatures as well as lotus are featured.

The prang's crypt, accessible by steep stairs, houses faded frescoes. These comprise some of the rare such examples from the early Ayutthaya period. The crypt's Buddha images, now housed in the Chao Sam Phraya National Museum , exhibit both Khmer and Sukhothai influences.

== Looting of the crypt ==
The discovery of the temple's crypt in 1956 became nationwide news. In 1957, a large group of thieves illegally excavated the crypt and looted artifacts. These included including royal regalia made of gold and jewels, antique jewelry, and several golden Buddha statues. The perpetrators were later arrested, but only a portion of the stolen items was recovered; some of the recovered objects are now housed in the nearby Chao Sam Phraya Museum. Subsequent official excavations by Thailand's Fine Arts Department uncovered a total of three rooms, which are decorated with murals. The rooms were filled with over 100,000 neatly stacked votive tablets bearing images of Buddha from Thailand, India, Burma, Indonesia, and Nepal. Among the votive tablets are three with Chinese inscriptions and a gold plaque with Chinese characters. A total of 2000 offerings and more than 100 kilograms of gold were discovered, including two gold pieces from Kashmir, three Buddha images from Sri Lanka, a stone Buddha from India, and another from Nepal. These finds are now kept at the Chao Sam Phraya National Museum.

== In popular culture ==
The 1995 music video for Bon Jovi's "This Ain't a Love Song" was filmed at Wat Ratchaburana in Ayutthaya Historical Park, Thailand, and was directed by British commercial, film, and music video director Andy Morahan.

== Image gallery ==
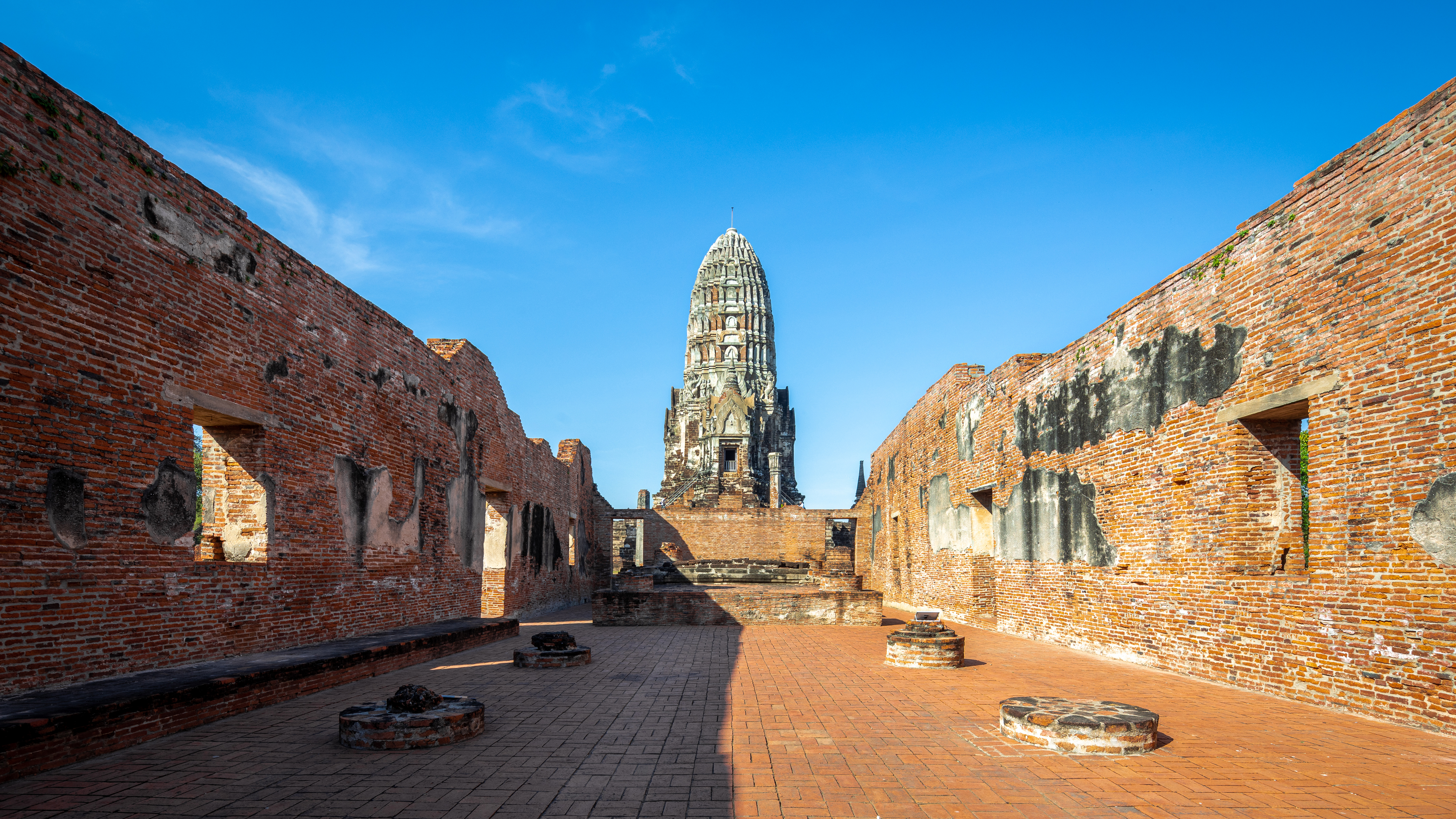
The main stupa

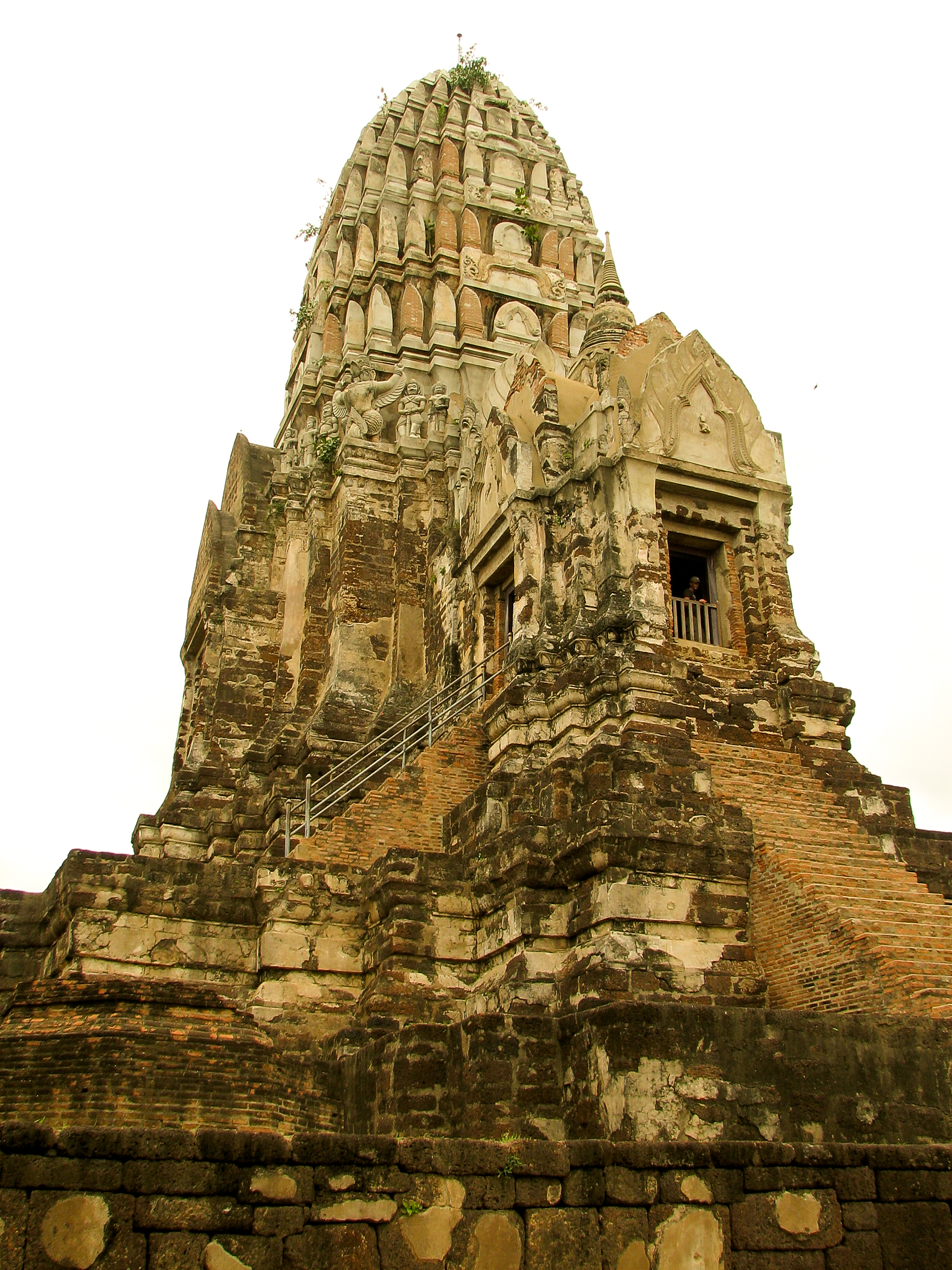
Central prang of Wat Ratchaburana

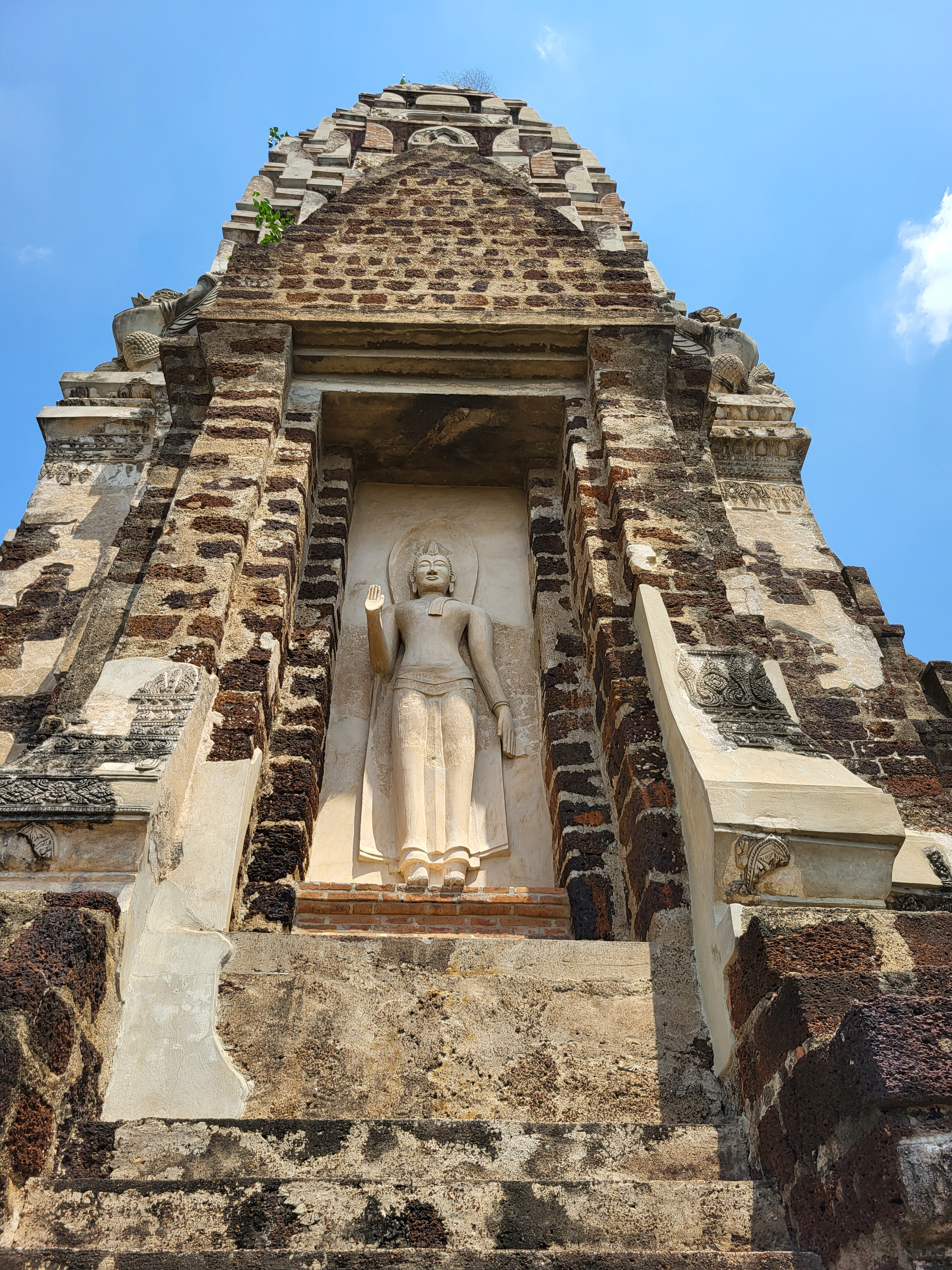

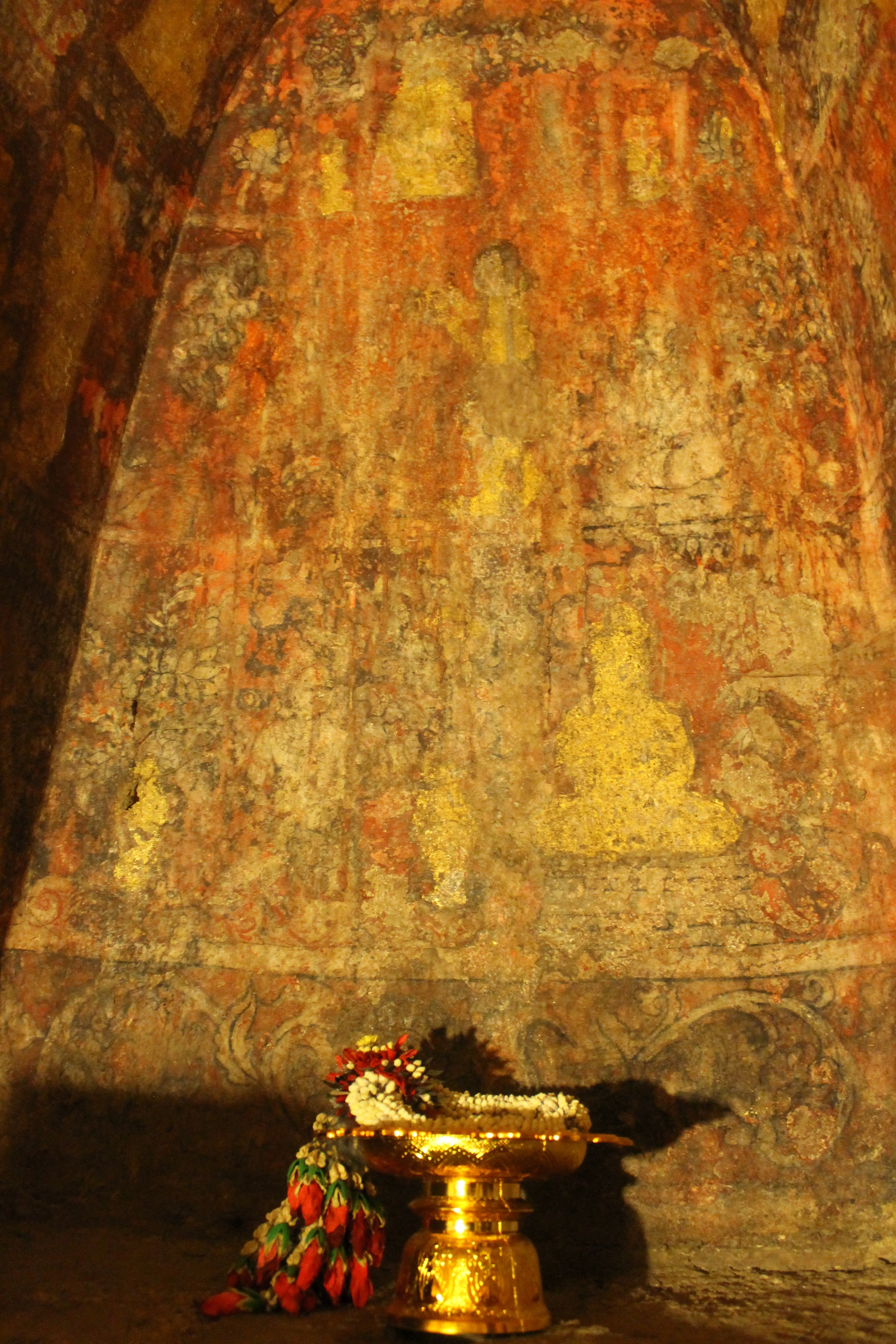
Elaborate mural inside the crypt of Wat Ratchaburana

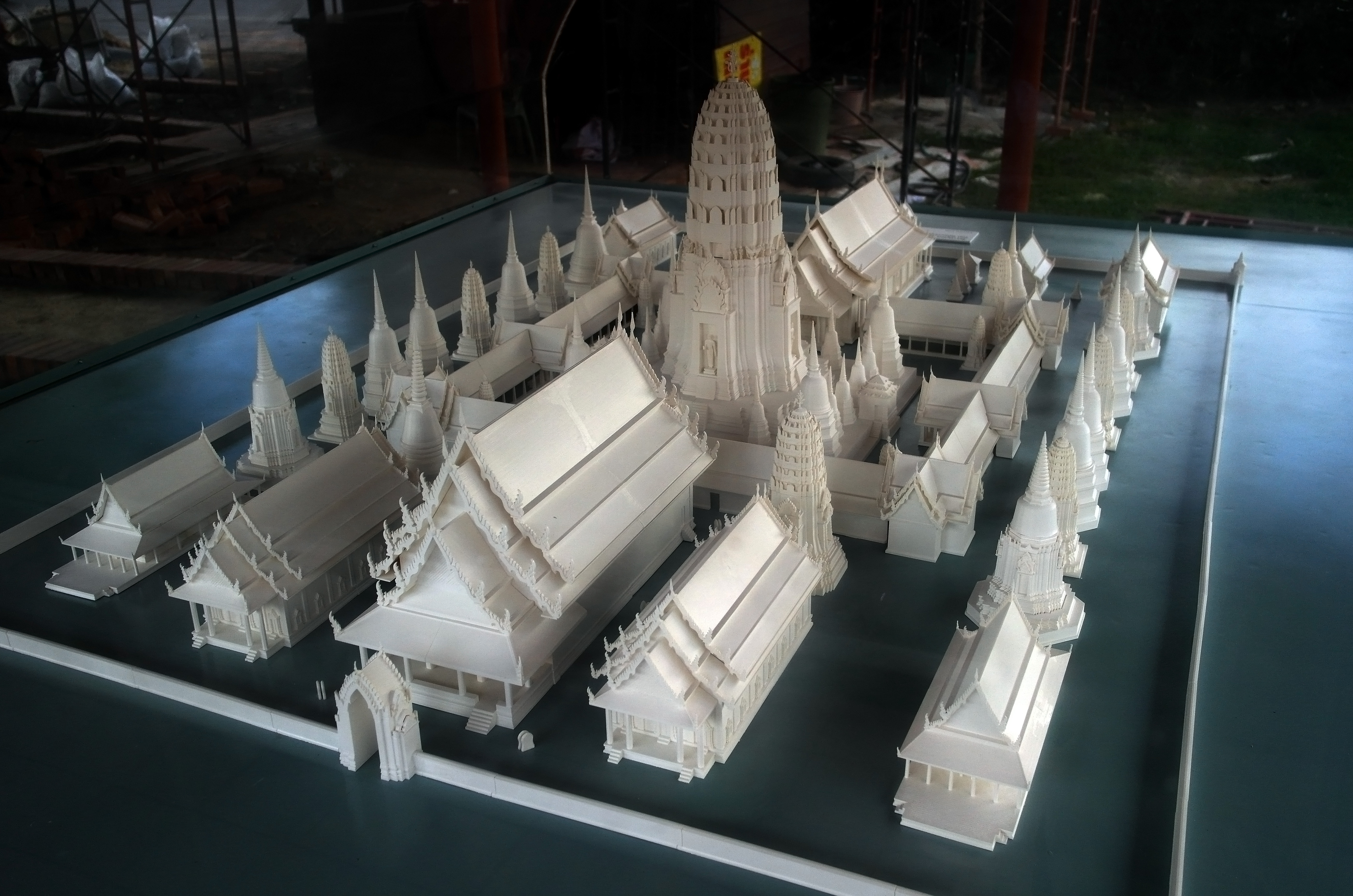
Wat Ratchaburana model
