= List of museums in Thailand =

This is a list of museums in Thailand.

Name	Province
List of museums in Bangkok	Bangkok
Ancient Siam	Samut Prakan
Chiang Mai National Museum	Chiang Mai
Erawan Museum	Samut Prakan
Golden Jubilee Museum of Agriculture	Pathum Thani
Hellfire Pass	Kanchanaburi
Highland People Discovery Museum	Chiang Mai
HTMS Maeklong	Samut Prakan
JEATH War Museum	Kanchanaburi
Khon Kaen National Museum	Khon Kaen
Lanna Folklife Museum	Chiang Mai
Nakhon Si Thammarat National Museum	Nakhon Si Thammarat
National Science Museum	Pathum Thani
Phu Wiang Dinosaur Museum	Khon Kaen
Princess Maha Chakri Sirindhorn Natural History Museum	Songkhla
Rare Stone Museum	Pathum Thani
Ripley's Believe It or Not!, Pattaya	Chonburi
Southeast Asian Ceramics Museum	Pathum Thani
The Supreme Artist Hall	Pathum Thani
Thai Human Imagery Museum	Nakhon Pathom
Thailand–Burma Railway Museum	Kanchanaburi
USS Gallup (PF-47)	Rayong
USS Glendale (PF-36)	Nakhon Nayok
Oub Kham Museum, Chiang Rai	Chiang Rai

== See also ==
- List of provinces of Thailand
- List of natural history museums in Thailand
- Tourism in Thailand
- Culture of Thailand
