= Wat Choeng Tha, Phra Nakhon Si Ayutthaya =

Buddhist temple in Ayutthaya, Thailand

Wat Choeng Tha
- วัดเชิงท่า
- Vihara and principal chedi of Wat Choeng Tha

Religion
- Affiliation: Theravada Buddhism
- Sect: Maha Nikaya

Location
- Location: Tha Wasukri Subdistrict, Phra Nakhon Si Ayutthaya District, Phra Nakhon Si Ayutthaya Province, Thailand
- Country: Thailand
- Interactive map of Wat Choeng Tha
- Coordinates: 14.3621°N 100.5554°E

Wat Choeng Tha (วัดเชิงท่า) is a Buddhist temple and historic site in Tha Wasukri sub-district, Phra Nakhon Si Ayutthaya District, Thailand. It is located near the former Lopburi River.

== History ==
The exact date of the temple's construction and its founder are unknown. A local story says that a wealthy man built a house for his daughter. She later left with her lover and did not return. The man eventually gave the house to a temple. The temple was then known as Wat Khoi Tha (วัดคอยท่า).

During the reign of King Narai, court minister Kosa Pan, who had recently returned from France as an ambassador, restored the temple and gave it the name Wat Kosa Wat (วัดโกษาวาส). It was later restored again during the reign of King Borommakot.

According to a local historical account, the future Taksin studied at Wat Kosa Wat under Phra Ajarn Thongdi when he was a child. The account says that he was later ordained as a monk under the same teacher at the temple at the age of 21 and remained there for three years.

== Architecture ==
Sermon Hall

Pulpit inside the Sermon Hall

Mural paintings inside the sermon hall.

The temple has several historic buildings. The main structure is a brick prang in the Ayutthaya style. A vihara is attached to the southern side of the prang. The temple also has an ubosot, a sermon hall and a bell tower.

The sermon hall was rebuilt during the reign of King Mongkut. It contains mural paintings with Buddhist stories and scenes of life in the period.

The bell tower has a mandapa-style structure with four open sides and stucco decoration.

== Royal barge dock ==
From July to October 2020, the Fine Arts Department carried out archaeological excavations at an old canal and along the riverbank near the temple. The area, known as Khu Mai Rong (คูไม้ร้อง), was used for keeping and mooring royal barges during the Ayutthaya period, according to old maps and historical records.

The location of the royal barge house under Wat Choeng Tha corresponds to the location described by the French envoy Simon de la Loubère during the reign of King Narai. The source suggests that the royal barge house may have existed since at least the reign of King Narai.

During the Second Fall of Ayutthaya in 1767, King Ekkathat ordered the royal barges to be moved to the rear of the canal. The Burmese army later attacked the area and burned many of the royal barges.

The 2020 excavation found an old landing place beside the Lopburi River. It was about 2.5 metres (8 ft 2 in) below the present ground level. Bricks at the landing place were arranged in a herringbone pattern. Some ancient objects, including earthenware pots, were also found near the temple's ubosot.

A Garuda boat prow (โขนเรือครุฑ) was found underwater near the former royal barge area. It is now kept at the Chao Sam Phraya National Museum in Ayutthaya. The source says that a shrine had previously been established for it and that the shrine collapsed in 1902 during the reign of Chulalongkorn.

A local tradition says that people later heard strange sounds around Khu Mai Rong and believed that they were the sounds of a female spirit believed to be linked with the former royal barge house. Local people later gave the area the name Khu Mai Rong. Local stories also say that people later tried to dig and build houses at the site but experienced strange events and were unable to build there.
