= National museums of Thailand =

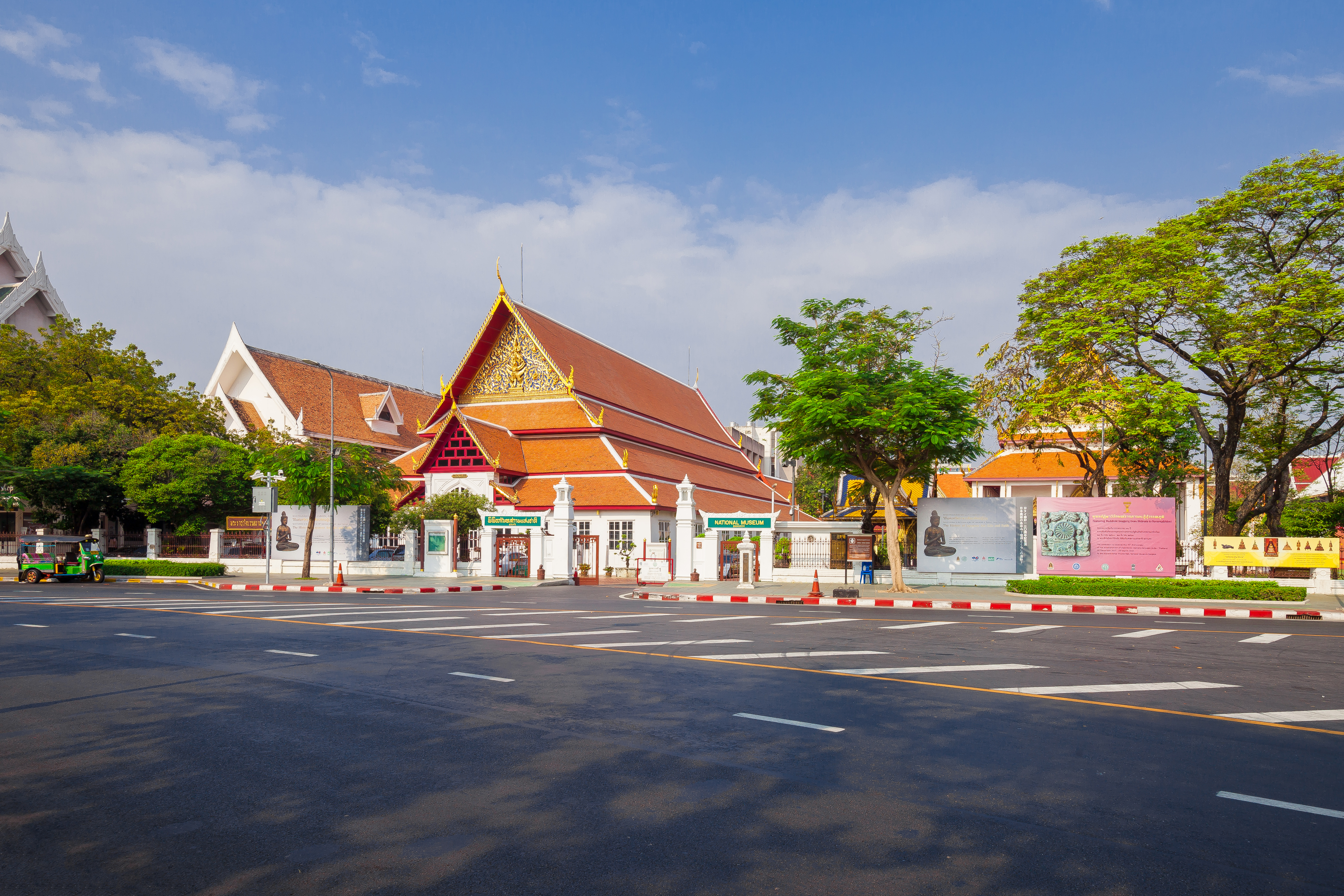
Bangkok National Museum

The national museums (Thai: พิพิธภัณฑสถานแห่งชาติ, RTGS: phiphitthaphanthasathan haeng chat) of Thailand are operated by the Fine Arts Department under the Ministry of Culture. They are responsible for safeguarding state-owned historical and cultural artefacts.

In 1926, King Prajadhipok established the Royal Institute of Art, Literature and Archaeology, which subsequently opened the national museum in Bangkok at the Front Palace. As of as of 2016, there are 43 national museum branches operating across the country.

== List of museums ==
=== Central ===
Bangkok

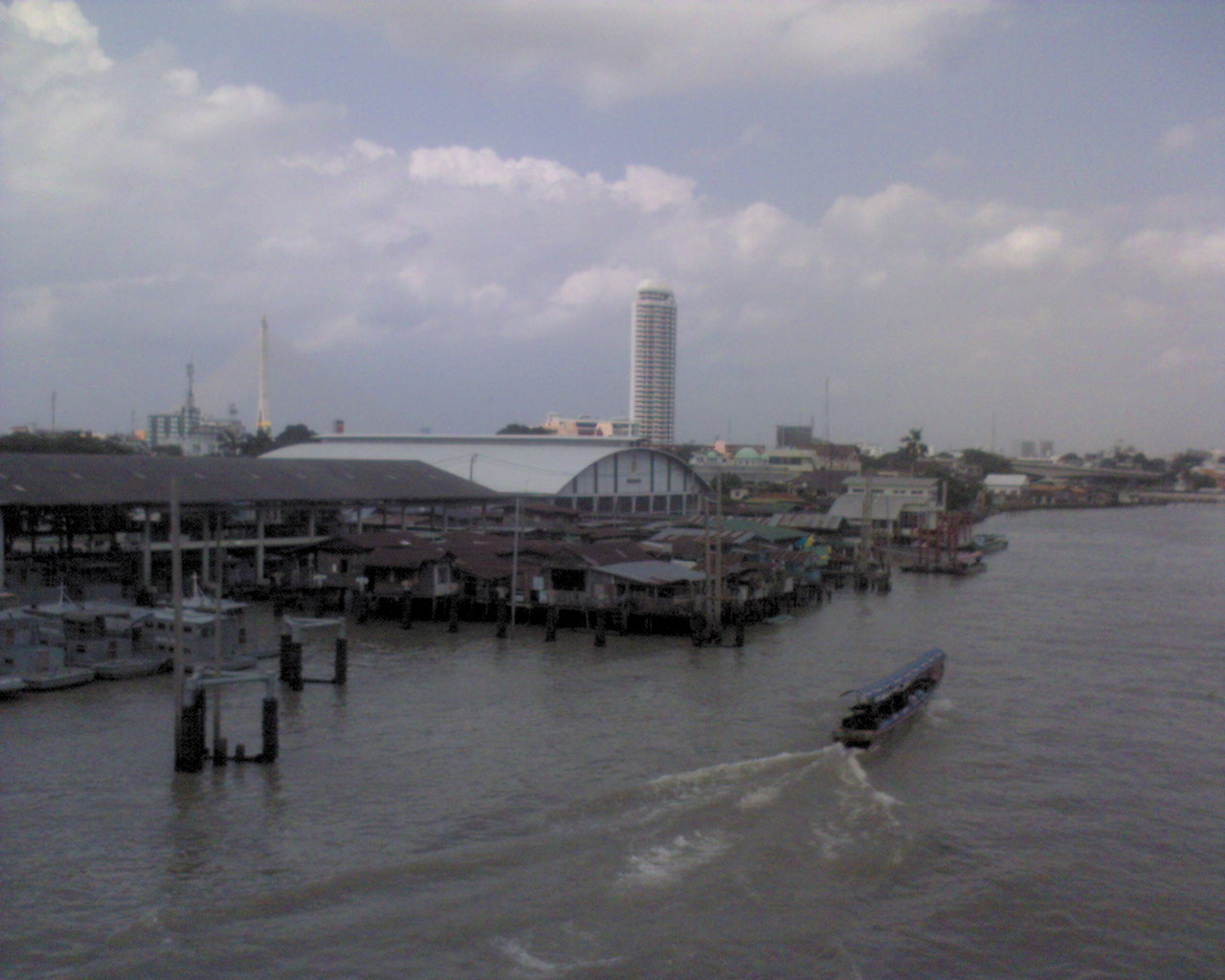
National Museum of Royal Barges

- Bangkok National Museum
- National Museum of Royal Barges
- Royal Elephant National Museum
- Benchamabopit National Museum
- The National Gallery
- Silpa Bhirasri National Museum

Pathum Thani

- Kanchanaphisek National Museum

Ayutthaya

- Chao Sam Phraya National Museum
- Chantharakasem National Museum

Lopburi

- Narai National Museum

Singburi

- Inburi National Museum

Chai Nat

- Chai Natmuni National Museum

Suphan Buri

- U Thong National Museum
- Suphanburi National Museum
- Thai Rice Farmers National Museum

Nakhon Pathom

- Phra Pathommachedi National Museum

Phetchaburi

- Phra Nakhon Khiri National Museum

Kanchanaburi

- Bankao National Museum

Ratchaburi

- Ratchaburi National Museum

Prachinburi

- Prachinburi National Museum

Chanthaburi

- National Maritime Museum

=== North ===
Sukhothai

- Ramkhamhaeng National Museum
- Sawanworanayok National Museum

Kamphaeng Phet

- Kamphaeng Phet National Museum

Phitsanulok

- Phra Phutthachinnarat National Museum

Chiang Mai

- Chiang Mai National Museum

Chiang Rai

- Chiang Saen National Museum

Lamphun

- Hariphunchai National Museum

Nan

- Nan National Museum

=== Northeast ===
Nakhon Ratchasima

- Phimai National Museum
- Mahaviravong National Museum

Roi Et

- Roi-Et National Museum

Surin

- Surin National Museum

Ubon Ratchathani

- Ubon Ratchathani National Museum

Khon Kaen

- Khon Kaen National Museum

Udon Thani

- Ban Chiang National Museum

=== South ===
Nakhon Si Thammarat

- Nakhon Si Thammarat National Museum

Surat Thani

- Chaiya National Museum

Phuket

- Thalang National Museum

Songkhla

- Songkhla National Museum
- Muchimavas National Museum

Chumphon

- Chumphon National Museum

Satun

- Satun National Museum
