= Wat Mahathat (Ayutthaya) =

Buddhist temple in Ayutthaya, Thailand

Coordinates: 14.3569°N 100.5675°E

- วัดมหาธาตุ
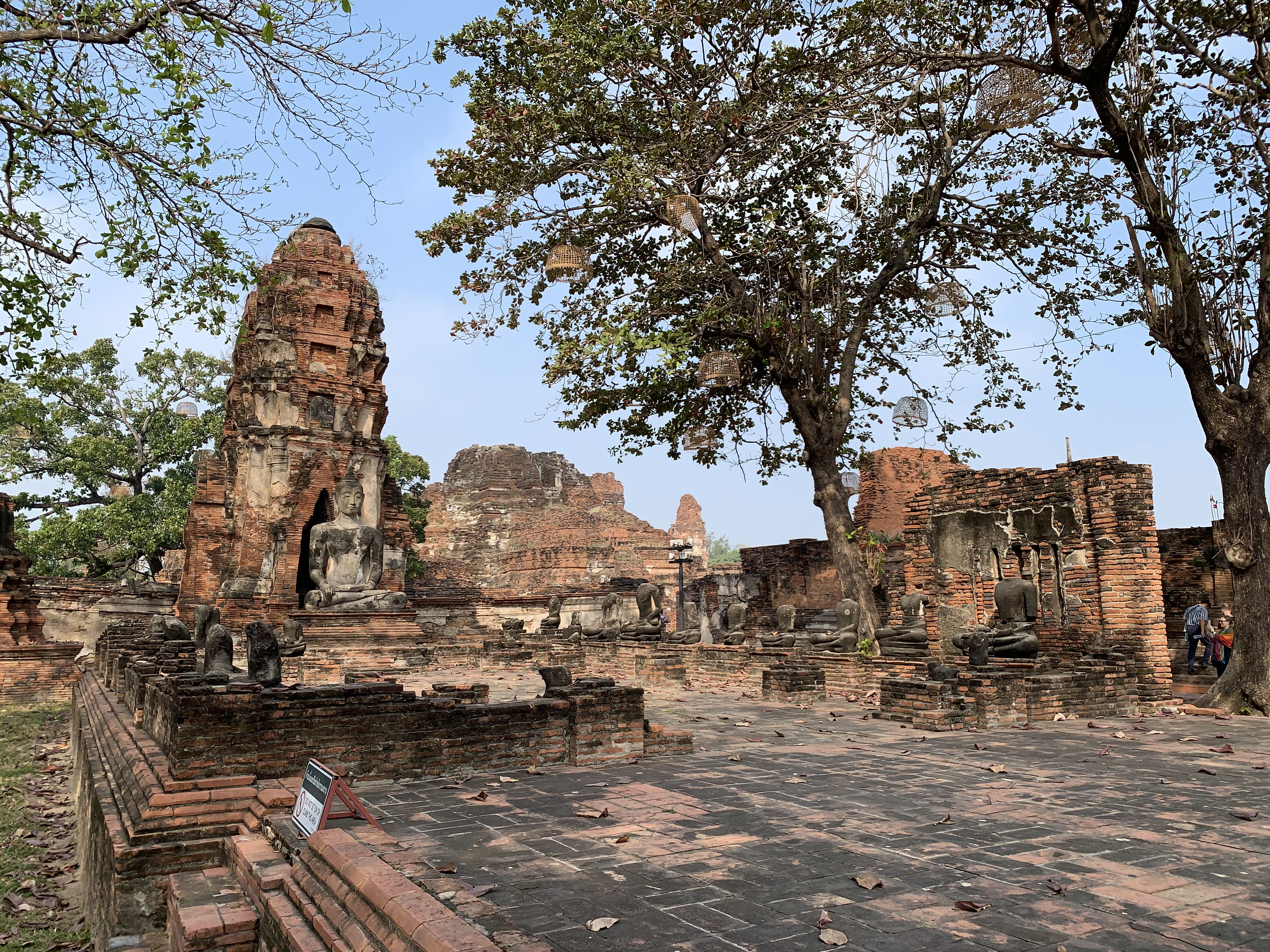

Religion
- Affiliation: Theravada Buddhism
- District: Ayutthaya
- Province: Ayutthaya

Location
- Country: Thailand
- Interactive map of Wat Mahathat

Architecture
- Founder: Borommarachathirat I
- Completed: 1374
- UNESCO World Heritage Site
- Official name: Historic City of Ayutthaya
- Type: Cultural
- Criteria: iii
- Designated: 1991
- Parent listing: Historic City of Ayutthaya
- Reference no.: 576
- Region: Asia and the Pacific

Wat Mahathat (Thai วัดมหาธาตุ พระนครศรีอยุธยา, Temple of the Great Relic) is a Buddhist temple in Ayutthaya, Thailand.

== Location ==
The Wat Mahathat is located in the center of Ayutthaya Historical Park, between Chi Kun Road and Naresuan Road in the northeast corner of Phra Ram Park.

== History ==
According to official Thai historiography, which is based on the research of the Royal Chronicles of Ayutthaya by Prince Damrong Rajanubhab, the history of Wat Mahathat begins around 1374, when King Borommaracha I had a temple built on this site, which initially bore a different name:

"In the Year of the Tiger 736 C.S. Somdet Phra Borommarachathirat and Phra Mahathera Thammakanlayan built the great, glorious, holy, jewelled reliquary (Phra Si Rattana Mahathat) east of the palace (the Royal gable of the lion). He rose 19 wa in height and equipped with a nine-membered tip that is another 3 wa in height."

His nephew and successor, Ramesuan (1369-1370, 1388-1395), expanded the structure into a large temple in 1384 while residing there as a monk between his royal duties. It was during this time that the temple received its current name.

However, Jeremias van Vliet, a Dutch merchant and chronicler of the Dutch East India Company (VOC) , attributed the temple's founding to King Ramathibodi I. In 1636, the same author wrote that, besides Wat Mahathat, Wat Phra Sri Sanphet, Wat Doen, and Wat Chao Phraya Thai were among the four principal temples in the entire country. The Supreme Patriarch of the Thai Buddhists resided at Wat Mahathat at that time. Furthermore, the temple was said to be fabulously wealthy; "people say that with the riches beneath the Buddha statues of Wat Mahathat and Wat Phra Sri Sanphet, a ruined kingdom could be restored." Jacques de Coutre, during his visit in 1596, also counted the temple among the "three most important pagodas" in the city.

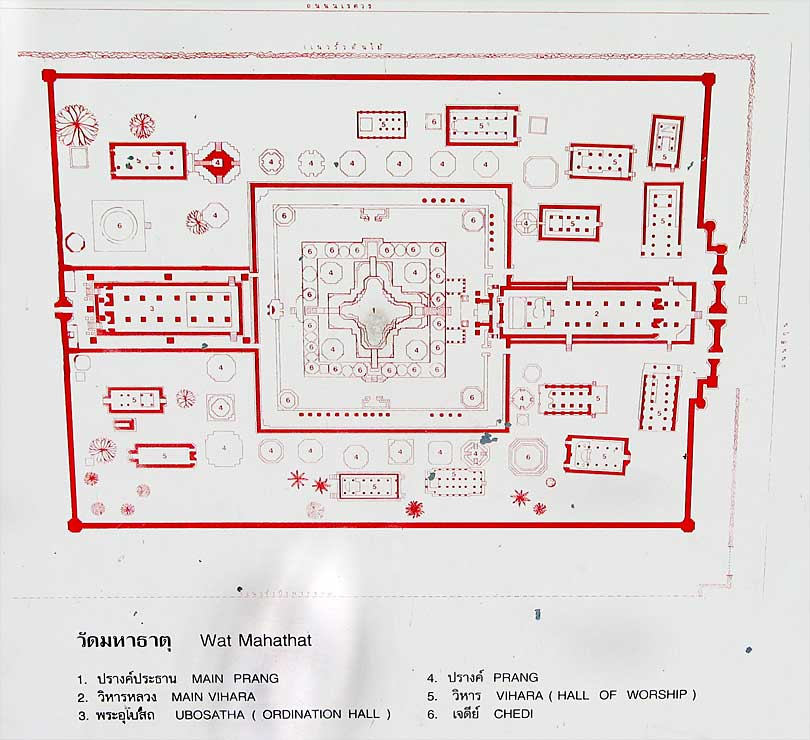
Ground plan of the ruins, Wat Mahathat

In 1631, during the reign of King Prasat Thong, the tall, central Khmer-style Golden Prang at Wat Mahathat suddenly collapsed "without storm, thunder, or lightning." The king immediately ordered its reconstruction, but shortly before completion, the scaffolding collapsed during a thunderstorm. It was not until two years later that the repairs were completed. The new prang was 1 sen and 5 wah (approximately 50 meters) high, topped with a metal spire six meters high. Around 1637, the temple was restored and expanded to commemorate the Millennium (C.S. 1000). The prang surrounded by a covered, inward-facing cloister. To the east, the back wall of a viharn projected into the cloister. A group of five chedi stood to the north of the viharn, and two more to the south.

The temple was painted around 1650 by a Dutch artist as the centerpiece of his painting of the capital city of Ayutthaya (now in the Rijksmuseum in Amsterdam).

In the period after 1750, further structures must have been added, as they were not mentioned by a Sinhalese delegation that visited the temple in 1750 and left a detailed report:

- the eight prang with gilded tips outside the gallery,
- the low platform with 10 chedi on each side around the central prang,
- the prang in each of the four corners on the upper platform,
- the extension of the central prang with four "arms," each supporting a smaller prang.

== Sights ==
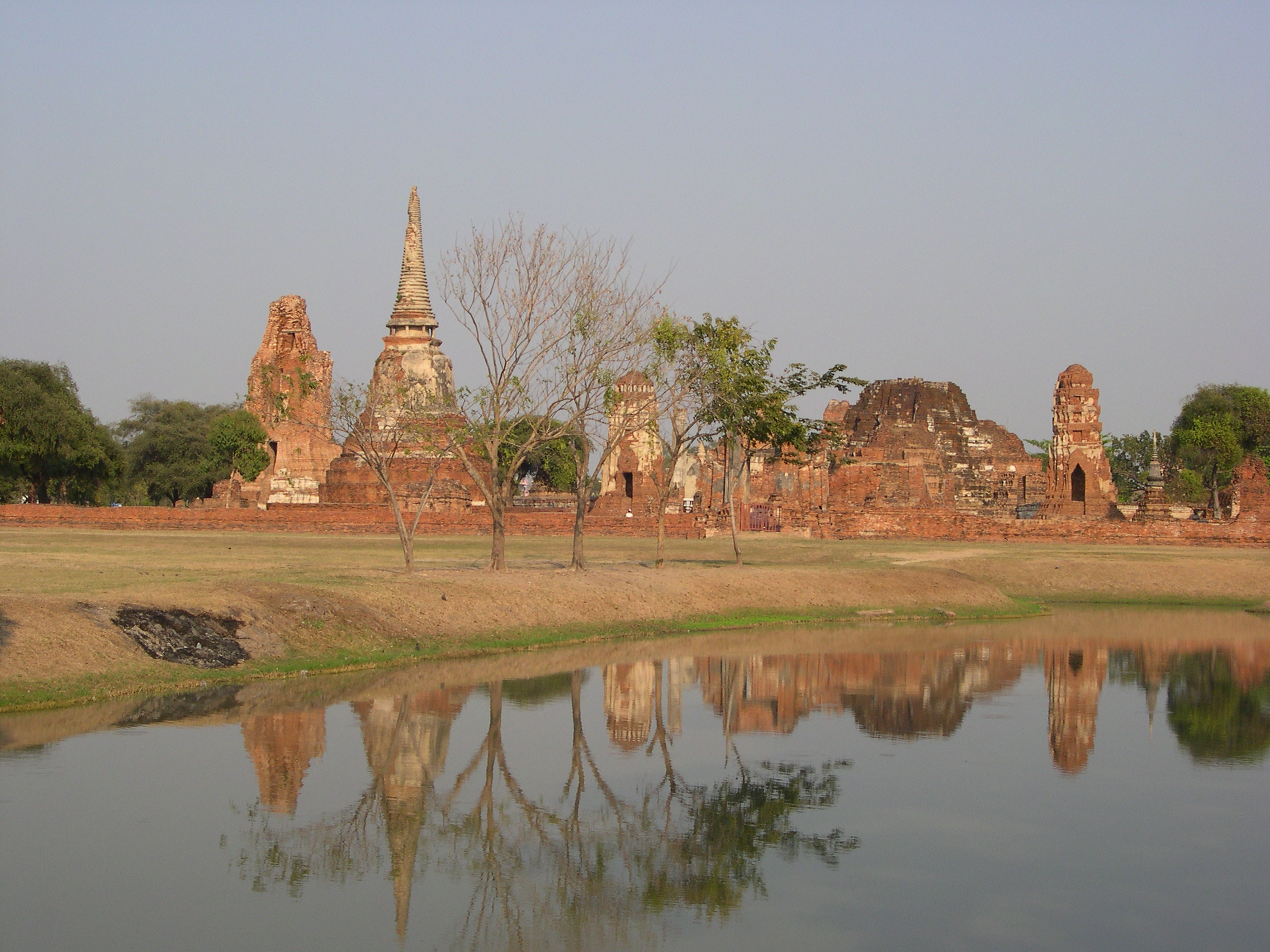
Sri Lankan-style chedi and ruins of the large prang, Wat Mahathat

The temple largely withstood arson by the Burmese conquerors who captured and virtually destroyed Ayutthaya in 1767 during the Burmese–Siamese War. The ruins visible today mostly date from the late 17th to the late 18th century.

The prang remained in good condition for a long time, but it collapsed again in 1911 during the reign of King Vajiravudh (Rama VI, r. 1910–1925) and was not rebuilt.

During extensive reconstruction work carried out by the Thai government in Ayutthaya in 1956, a buried treasure chest was unearthed at the prang. This chest contained a Buddha relic in a golden urn, several golden Buddha statues of various sizes, and other items. These are now kept at the Chao Sam Phraya National Museum in Ayutthaya.

== Gallery ==
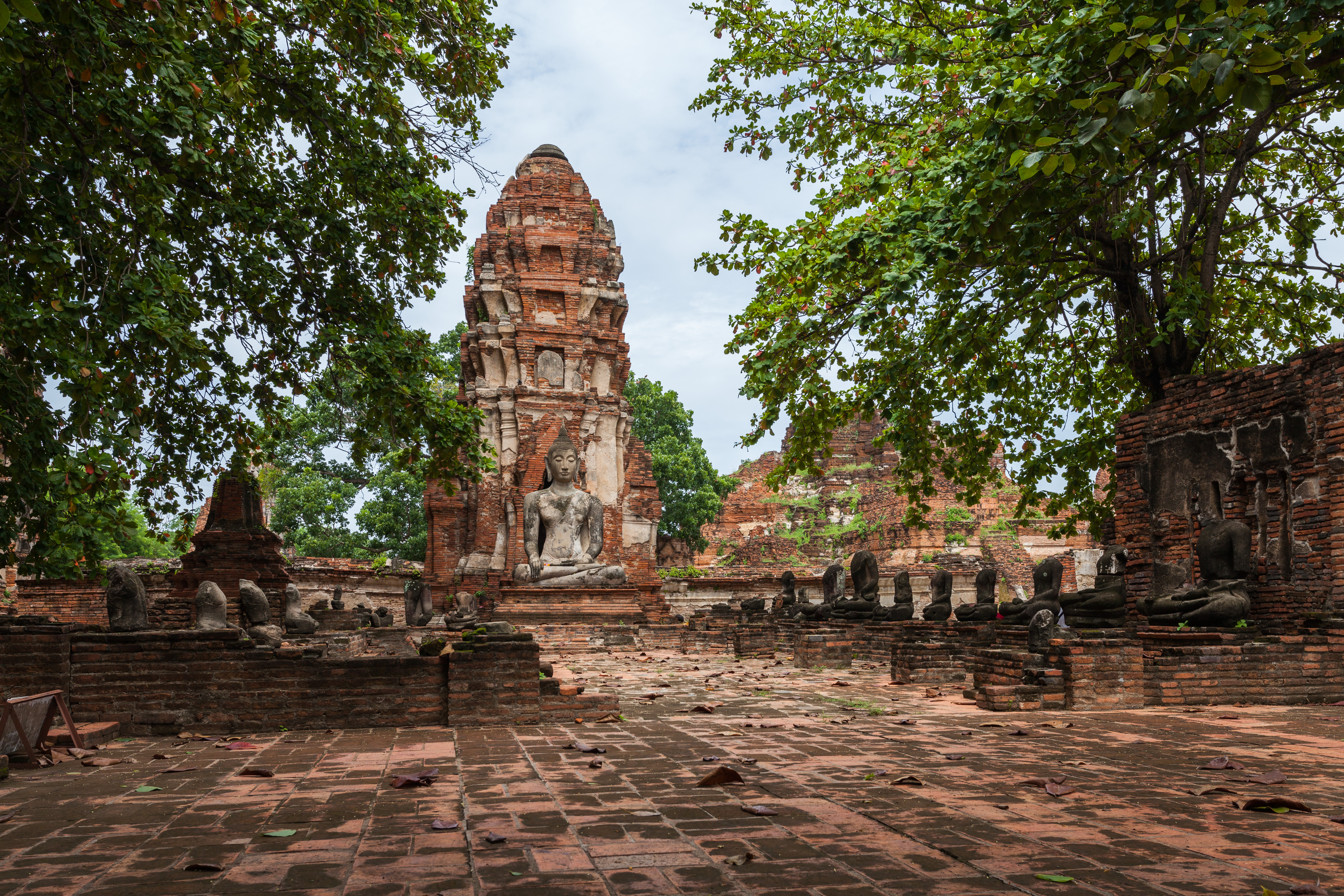
Prang and statue of Buddha, Wat Mahathat, Ayutthaya

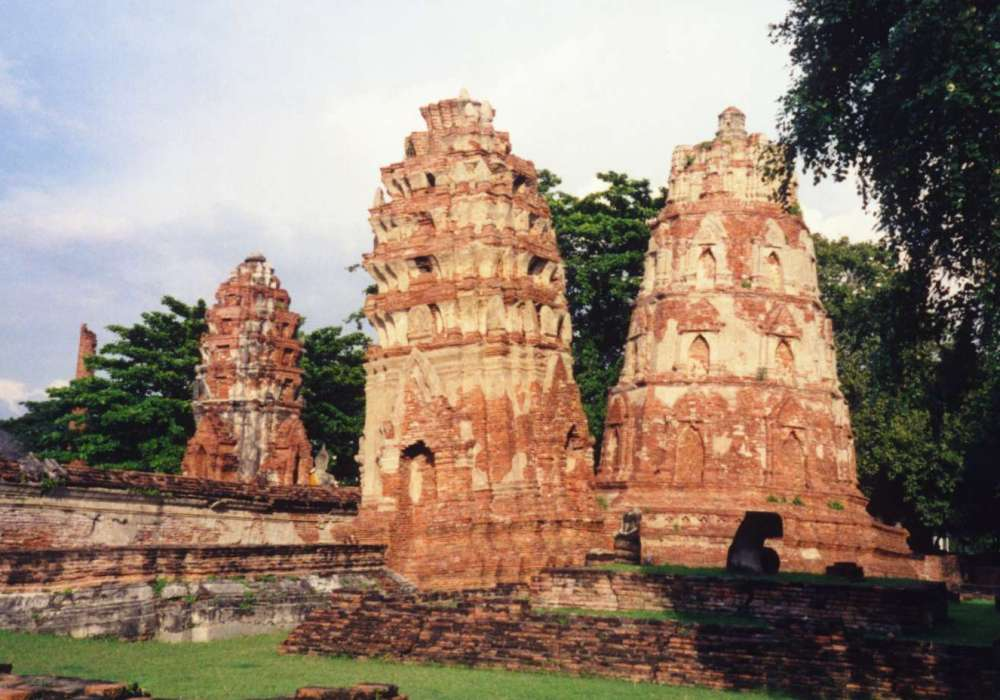
Wat Phra Mahathat, Ayutthaya

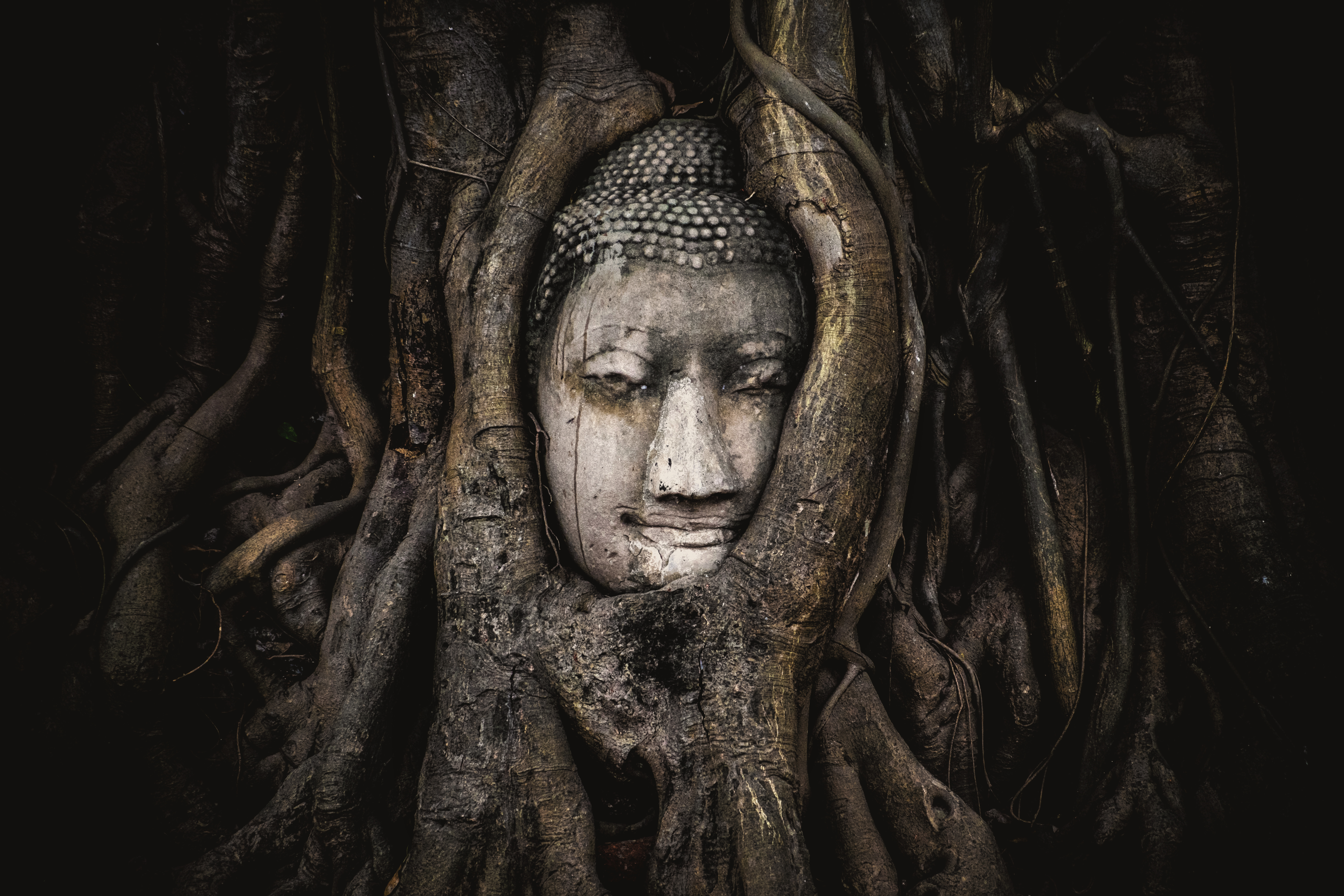
Probably the most photographed object in the area

== See also ==
- Ayutthaya Historical Park
