= Prachinburi National Museum =

Museum in Prachinburi, Thailand

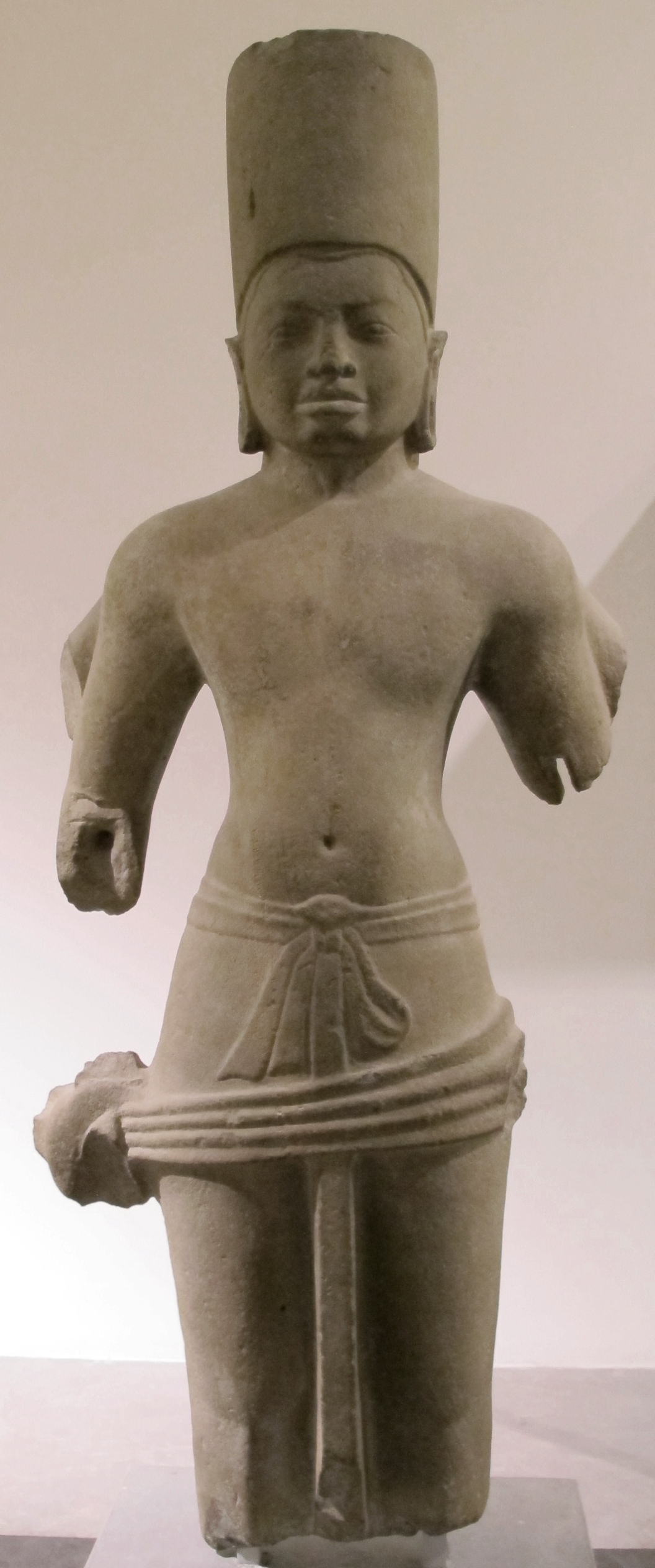
Viṣṇu from the province of Prachinburi (6th-7th century).

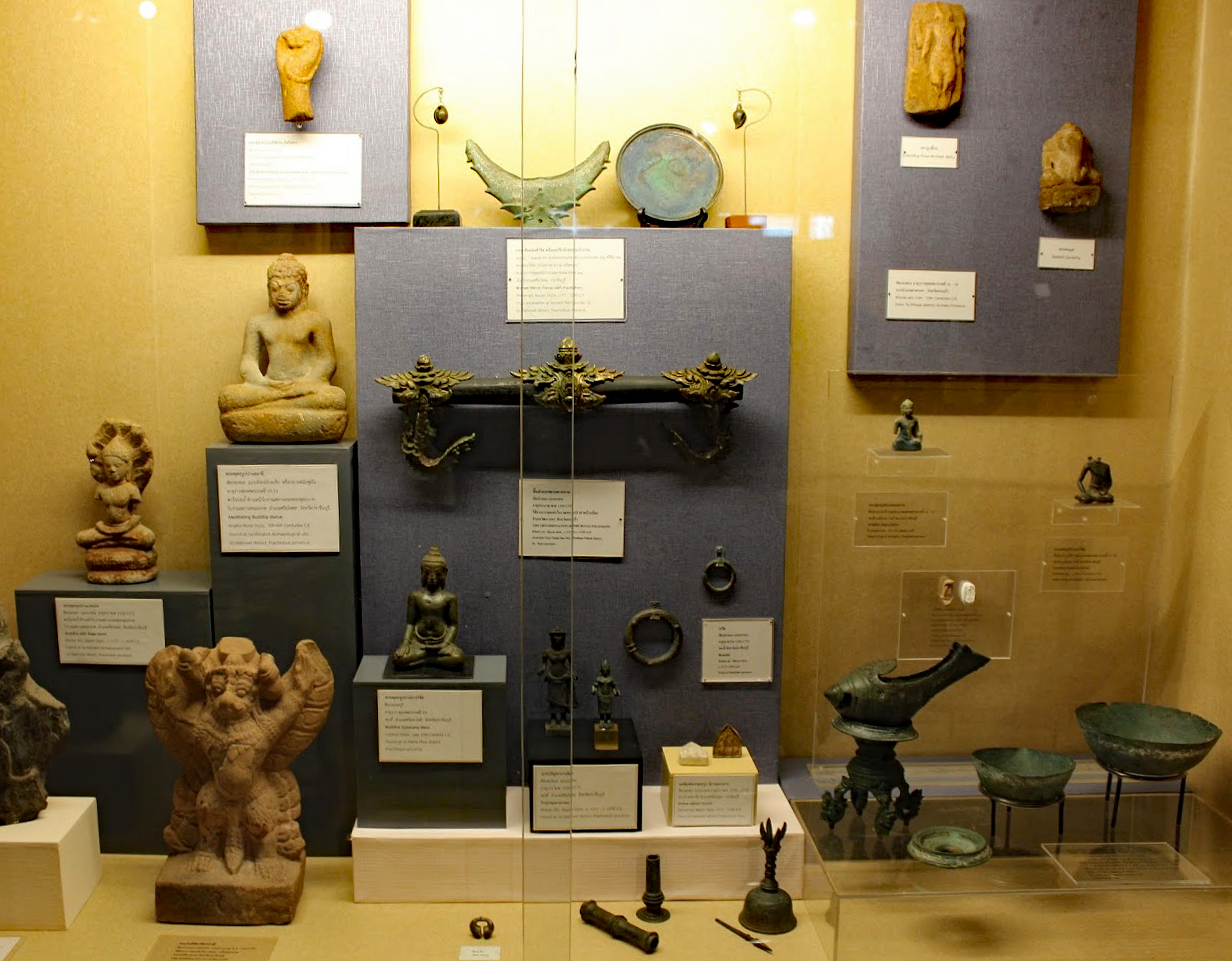
Prachinburi National Museum. Collections from Si Mahosot and other sites.

Prachinburi National Museum (Thai: พิพิธภัณฑสถานแห่งชาติ ปราจีนบุรี) is located in Prachinburi in the central province of Thailand. It is part of the network of National museums of Thailand operated by the Fine Arts Department of the Ministry of Culture which is responsible for the safeguarding of state-owned historical and cultural artefacts. In 1926, King Prajadhipok created the Royal Institute of Art, Literature and Archaeology which then opened the museum in Bangkok at the Wang Na palace. Since that time the network has expanded substantially and today there are total of forty three national museum branches across the country.

== Collections ==
The collections at the museum come from the seven districts (amphoe) of Prachinburi Province and are especially notable for early Buddhist and Hindu sculptures of the Dvaravati period.

== Virtual Museum ==
Highlights of the collection are available on the National Museums database.
