= Lanna Folklife Museum =

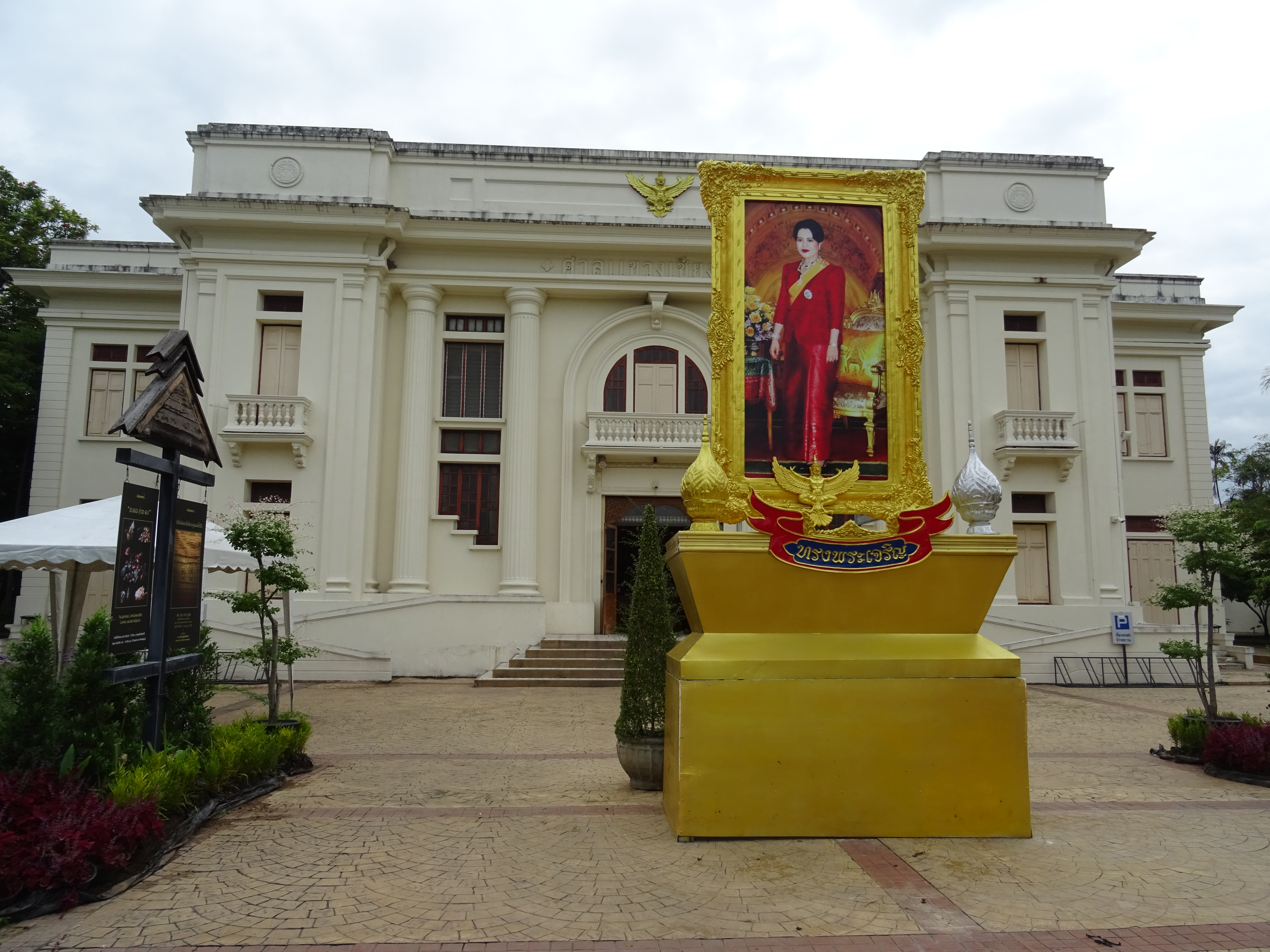
- Established: December 18, 2012; 13 years ago
- Location: Chiang Mai, Thailand
- Coordinates: 18.790222°N 98.988437°E
- Type: Ethnographic museum

The Lanna Folklife Museum (Thai: พิพิธภัณฑ์พื้นถิ่นล้านนา) is a museum in Chiang Mai, Thailand. The museum is dedicated to the culture of Northern Thailand.

== History ==
The building once belonged to the eighth ruler of Chiang Mai, Chao Intavaroros Suriyavongse. The building was used as a Provincial Courthouse dating from 1935. The Department of Treasury and the Court of Justice decided to renovate the building into a museum. In 2012, the museum opened for the first time.

== Collections ==
The museum contains information about Lanna traditions, Buddhist art and relics, ceremonial utensils, handicrafts (lacquerware, woven basketry, pottery, etc.), sculptures, paintings and murals of the Northern Thai people. In 2019, the museum presented an exhibition of Phra Upakut amulet statues made of different materials such as wood, stone, bronze, silver and gold, as well as traditional northern Thai costumes.

== Gallery ==
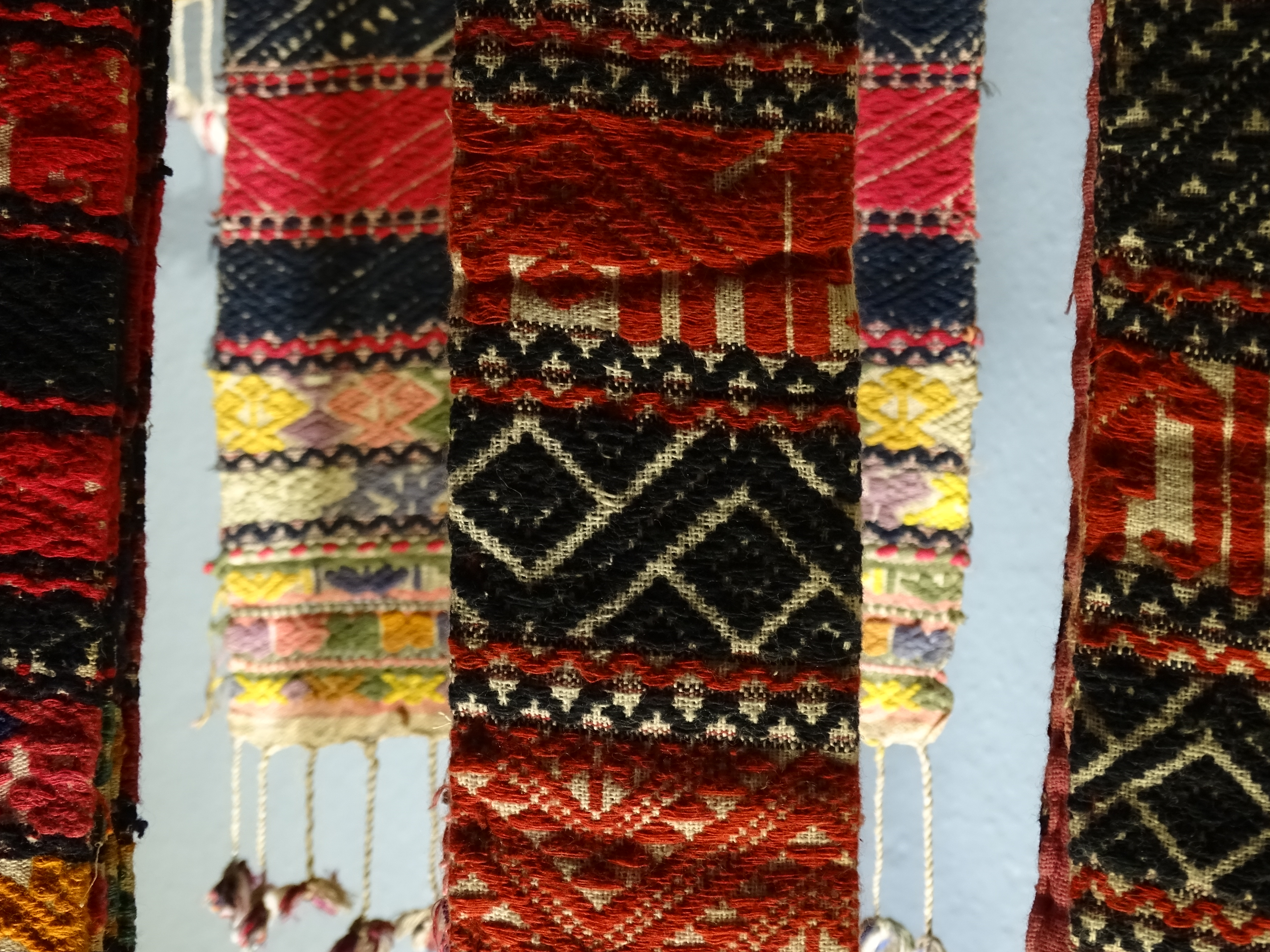

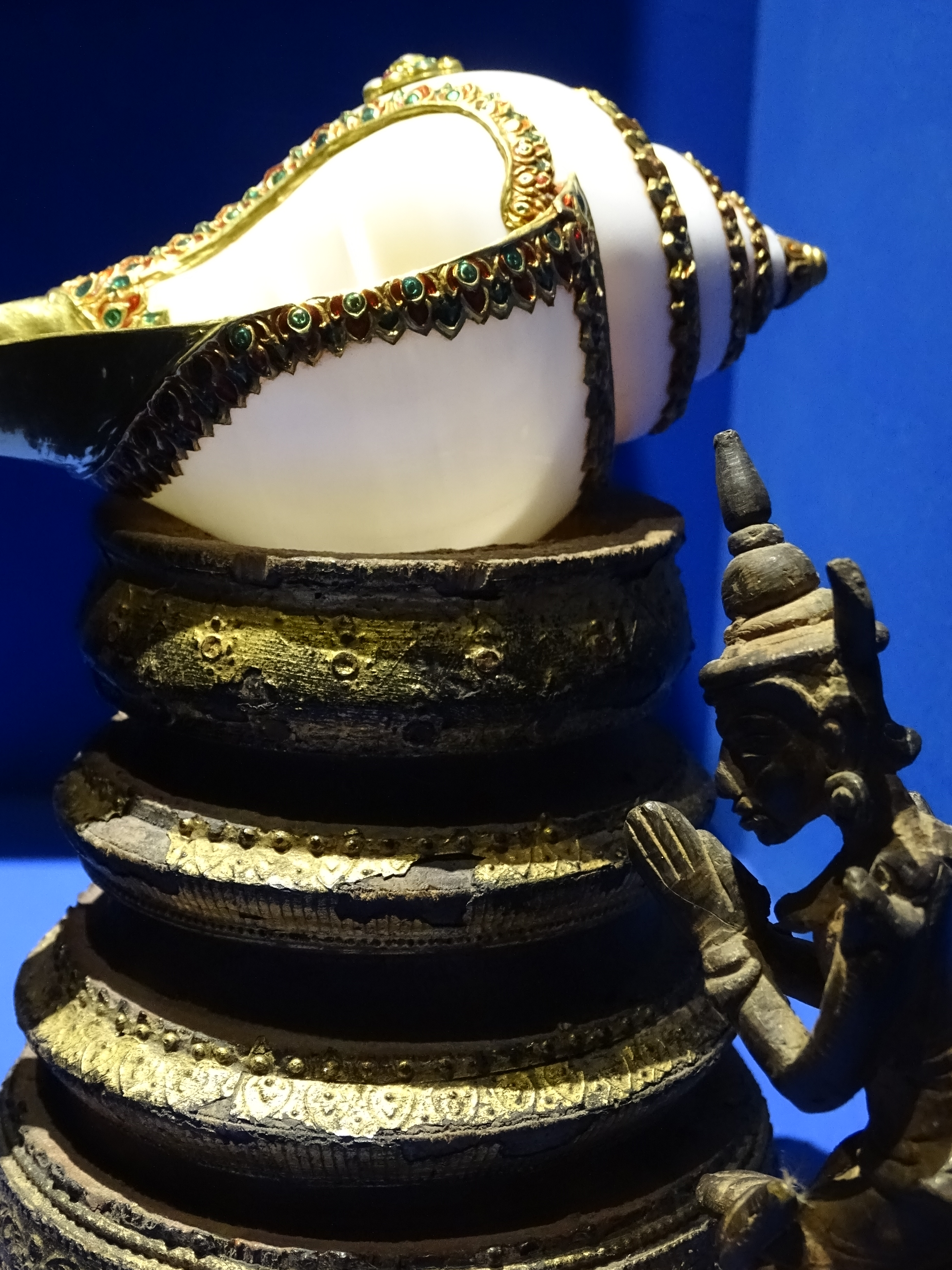

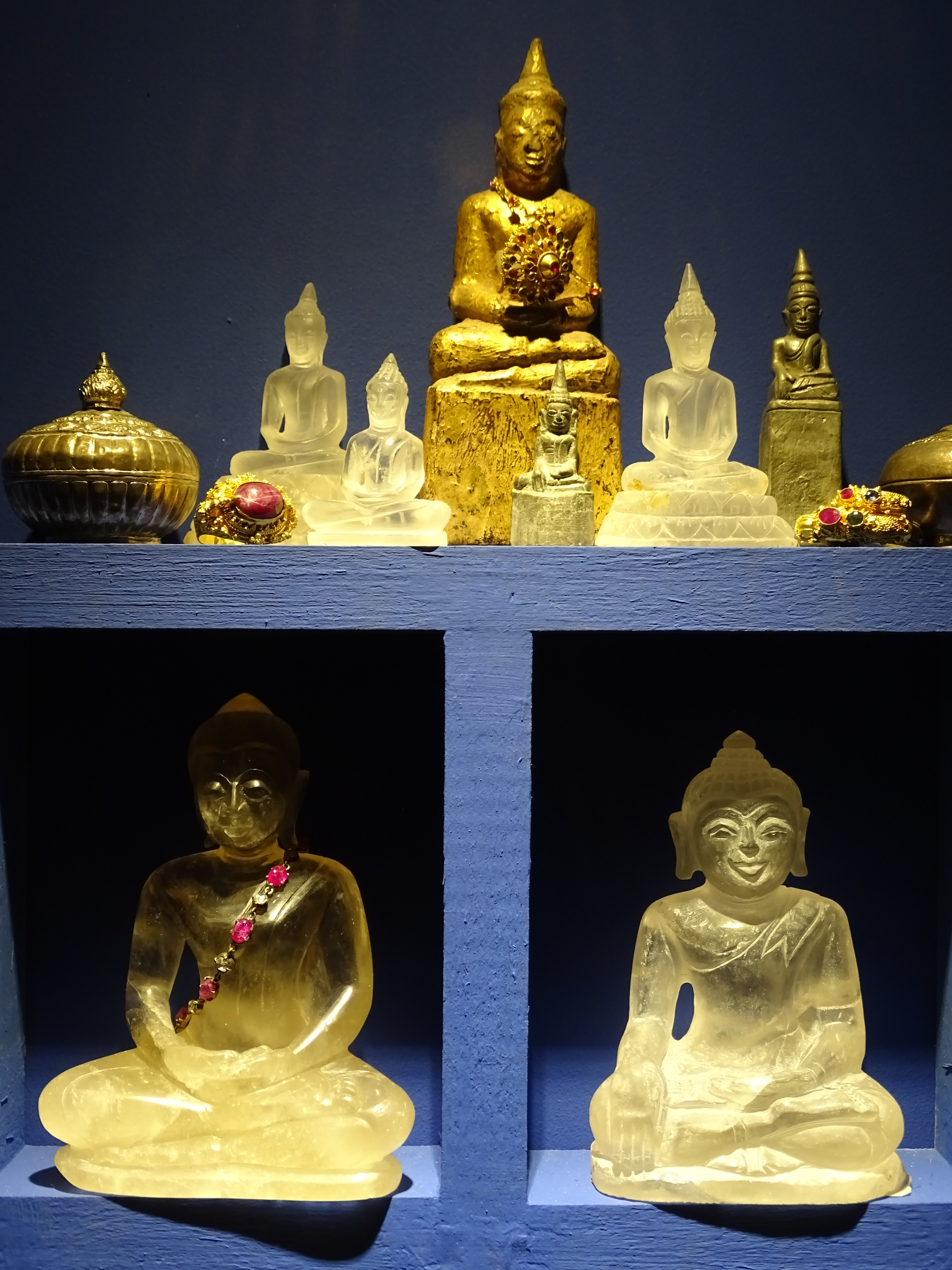

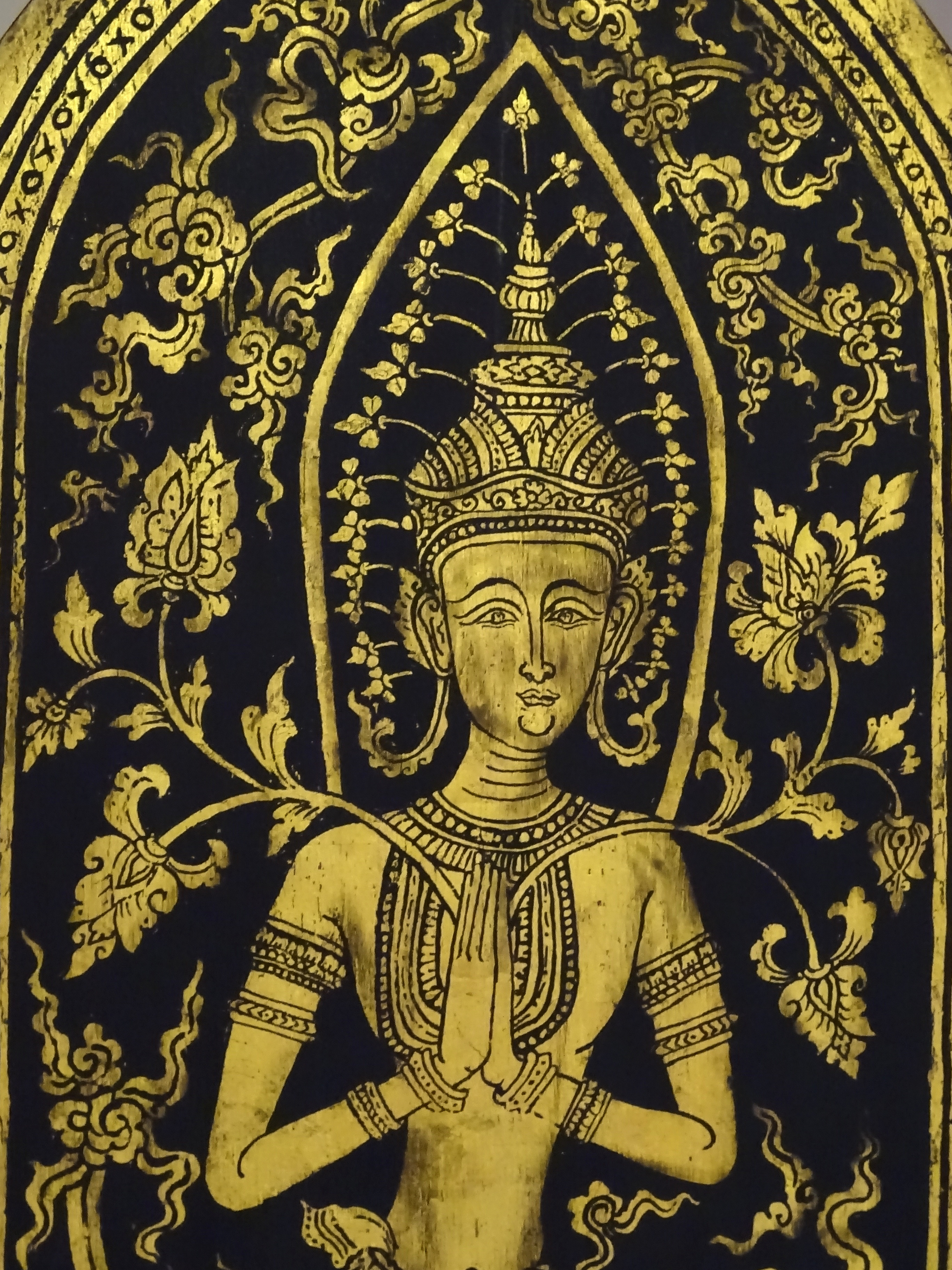
