= Chao Sam Phraya National Museum =

Museum in Ayutthaya, Thailand

- พิพิธภัณฑสถานแห่งชาติ เจ้าสามพระยา
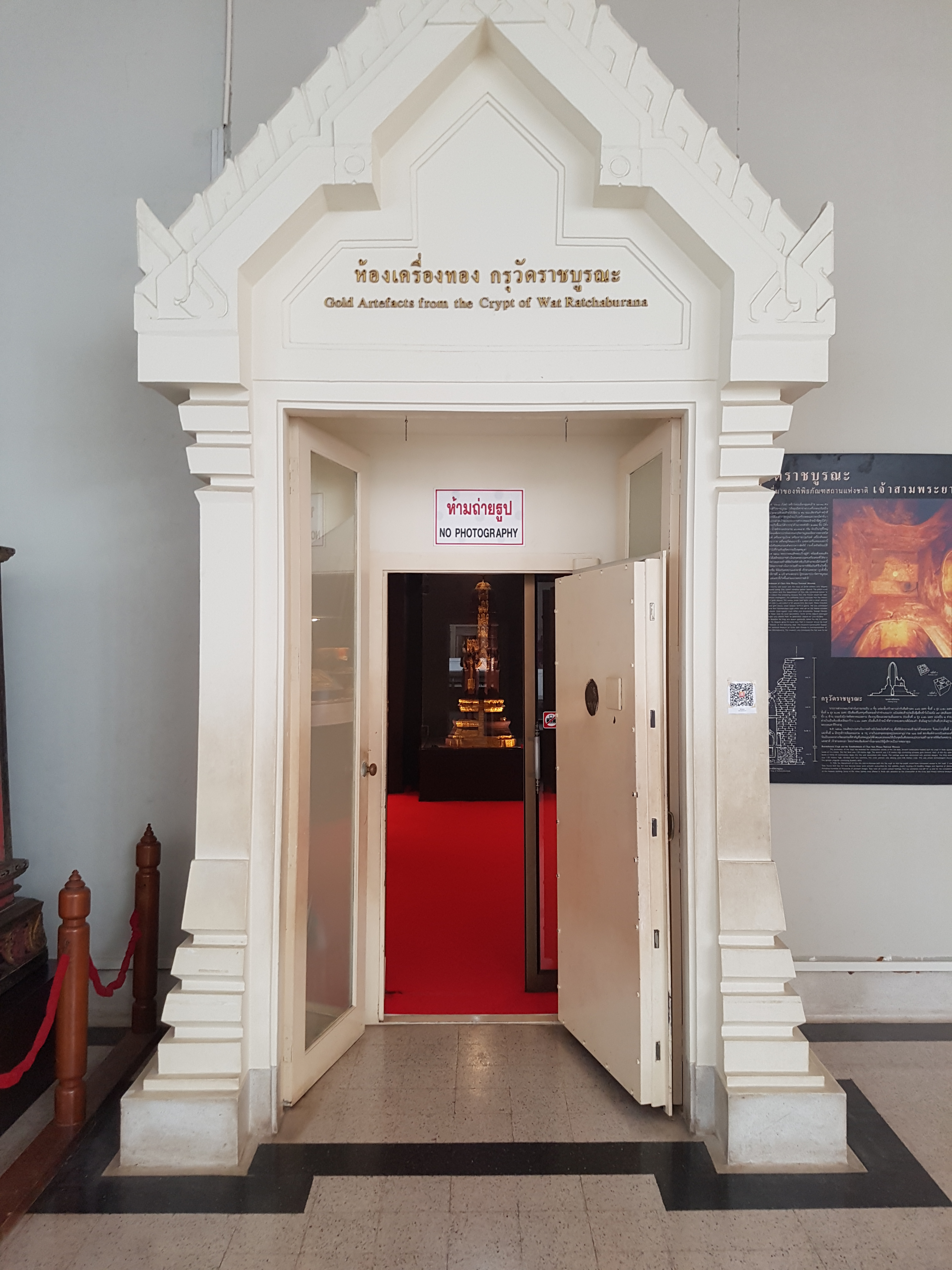
- Room housing items derived from Wat Ratchaburana's crypt, at Building 1, Chao Sam Phraya National Museum
- Established: 26 December 1961
- Location: Pratuchai, Phra Nakhon Si Ayutthaya 13000
- Curator: Fine Arts Department
- Owners: Fine Arts Department, Ministry of Culture
- Website: www.thailandmuseum.com/chawsampraya/history.htm

Chao Sam Phraya National Museum (Thai: พิพิธภัณฑสถานแห่งชาติ เจ้าสามพระยา) is a national museum in Phra Nakhon Si Ayutthaya, Thailand. It opened in 1961 and was created to house treasures discovered in the crypts of Wat Ratchaburana and Wat Mahathat, including Buddhist relics, jewellery, gold objects, and votive tablets, alongside a broader collection of sculpture and other artworks from historic sites in Ayutthaya.

As part of a Fine Arts Department redevelopment, the museum added an Ayutthaya Gold exhibition building to present gold finds from archaeological sites in Ayutthaya Province, displaying 2,244 objects.

== History ==
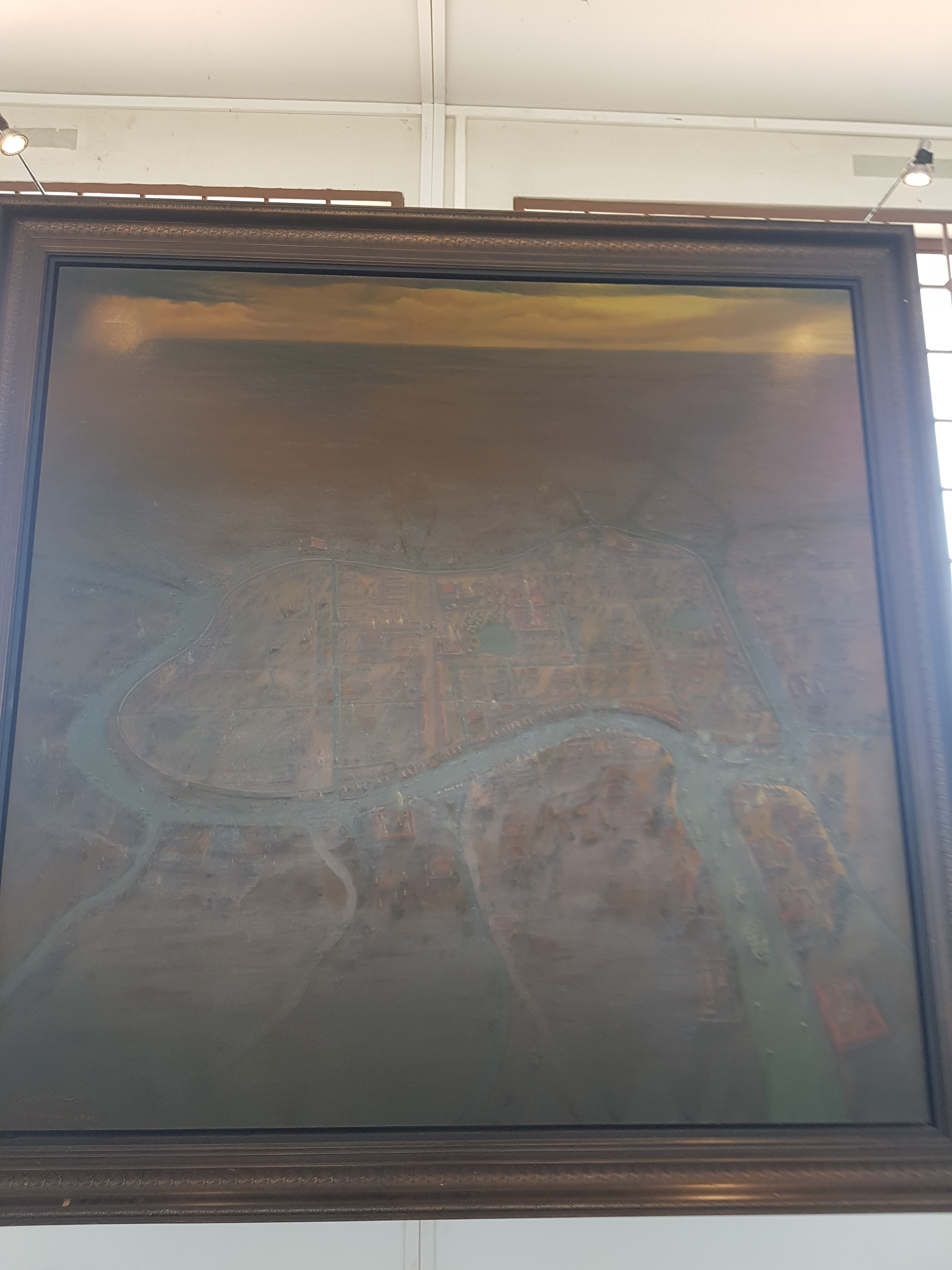
Painting of the isle where the Kingdom of Ayutthaya was located, now part of Phra Nakhon Si Ayutthaya Province, by Phit Taengphan

Following archaeological excavations and restoration work in Ayutthaya in the late 1950s, the Fine Arts Department established a new national museum to preserve and display high-value finds from temple sites in the province, especially material recovered from Wat Ratchaburana and Wat Mahathat. The museum was inaugurated on 26 December 1961.

Later development expanded the museum complex, including additional exhibition buildings added in 1970 and 1984.

In 2014, the Fine Arts Department adopted a policy to upgrade and further develop the museum by constructing a new Ayutthaya Gold exhibition building to display Ayutthaya-period gold objects found at archaeological sites in Phra Nakhon Si Ayutthaya Province. The foundation stone was laid on 2 August 2017, and the two-storey building (approximately 3,275 m^{2}) was organised into three main exhibition sections; it displays 2,244 objects.

== Notable objects ==
Highlighted items include:

- A large seated Buddha statue from the Dvaravati period.
- A bronze Buddha head in U Thong–style from Wat Thammikarat.
- Objects highlighted in the museum's Ayutthaya Gold exhibition building include:
  - The Sword of Victory (พระแสงขรรค์ชัยศรี)
  - A Gold Vessel (พระสุวรรณภิงคาร)
  - A miniature royal elephant (พระคชาธารจำลอง)
  - A coronet (จุลมงกุฎ)
  - A gold bonnet (พระสุวรรณมาลา)
  - A reliquary stupa containing Buddha relics (สถูปบรรจุพระบรมสารีริกธาตุ)
  - A lion-shaped box (ตลับรูปสิงโต)
- Selected sculptures displayed for comparative study include an image of Avalokitesvara and an image of Ganesha.
