= Chedi =

Chedi may refer to:

- Chedi (Thai: เจดีย์), an alternative term for a Buddhist stupa, mainly used in Thailand
  - Cetiya, a sacred place or object in Buddhism, from which the above is derived
  - Chaitya, a shrine in Indic religions, cognate with the above
- Chedi Kingdom, an early kingdom in central India
  - Cedī (tribe), an ancient Indian tribe
- Chedi, U Thong, a subdistrict of U Thong District, Suphan Buri Province, Thailand
- The Chedi, brand name of GHM Hotels
