= Khon Kaen National Museum =

Coordinates: 16.4462°N 102.8386°E

- พิพิธภัณฑ์แห่งชาติขอนแก่น
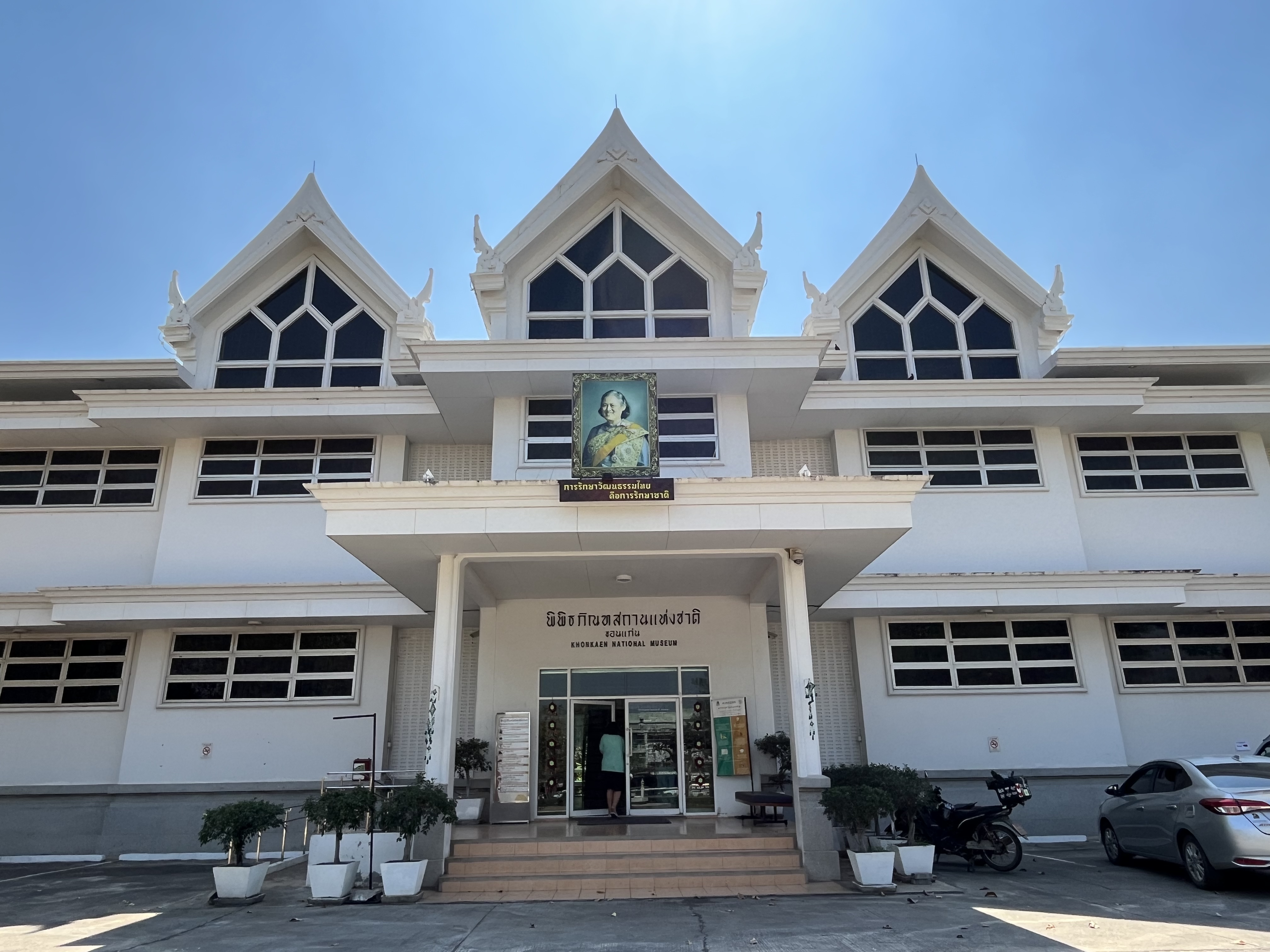
- Established: 1972
- Location: Mueang Khon Kaen, Khon Kaen, Thailand
- Type: National museum

The Khon Kaen National Museum (Thai: พิพิธภัณฑ์แห่งชาติขอนแก่น; RTGS: phiphitthaphan haeng chat khonkaen) was opened by King Bhumibol Adulyadej on 20 December 1972. Most of the exhibits are concerned with history, art, and archaeology. Besides the museum's permanent collection, temporary exhibitions are shown throughout the year.

== Collections ==
Exhibits in the museum include:

- The geography and geology of the prehistoric period
- Settlements, utensils, burial rituals, and major archaeological findings
- Ancient cities and communities
- Dvaravati culture
- Bai sema boundary markers, religion and beliefs, costumes, script, architecture, Votive offering tablets, archaeological objects taken from the Mueang Fa Daet Song Yang excavation site, Kamalasai District, Kalasin Province.
- Khmer or Lopburi culture
- Ancient cities and communities, religion and beliefs, ceramics, Thai-Lao culture
- Evolution of art in Thailand
- Traces of the past, history of the city, way of life, folk culture

The museum gathered its collection from archaeological sites in north and east Thailand, in particular, finds from Ban Chiang in Udon Thani Province, which has been given UNESCO heritage site status. Isan (or northeastern Thailand), once home to Ban Chiang, Dvaravati, Lopburi and Khmer civilizations.

The museum exhibits a range of architectural items, including marble slabs (sema), ancient bas reliefs, stuccoes and ancient tools. Among its other exhibits are dinosaur fossils, human skeletal remains, ancient musical instruments, pottery, and Buddha images.
