= Prang (architecture) =

Tower-like Buddhist architectural element

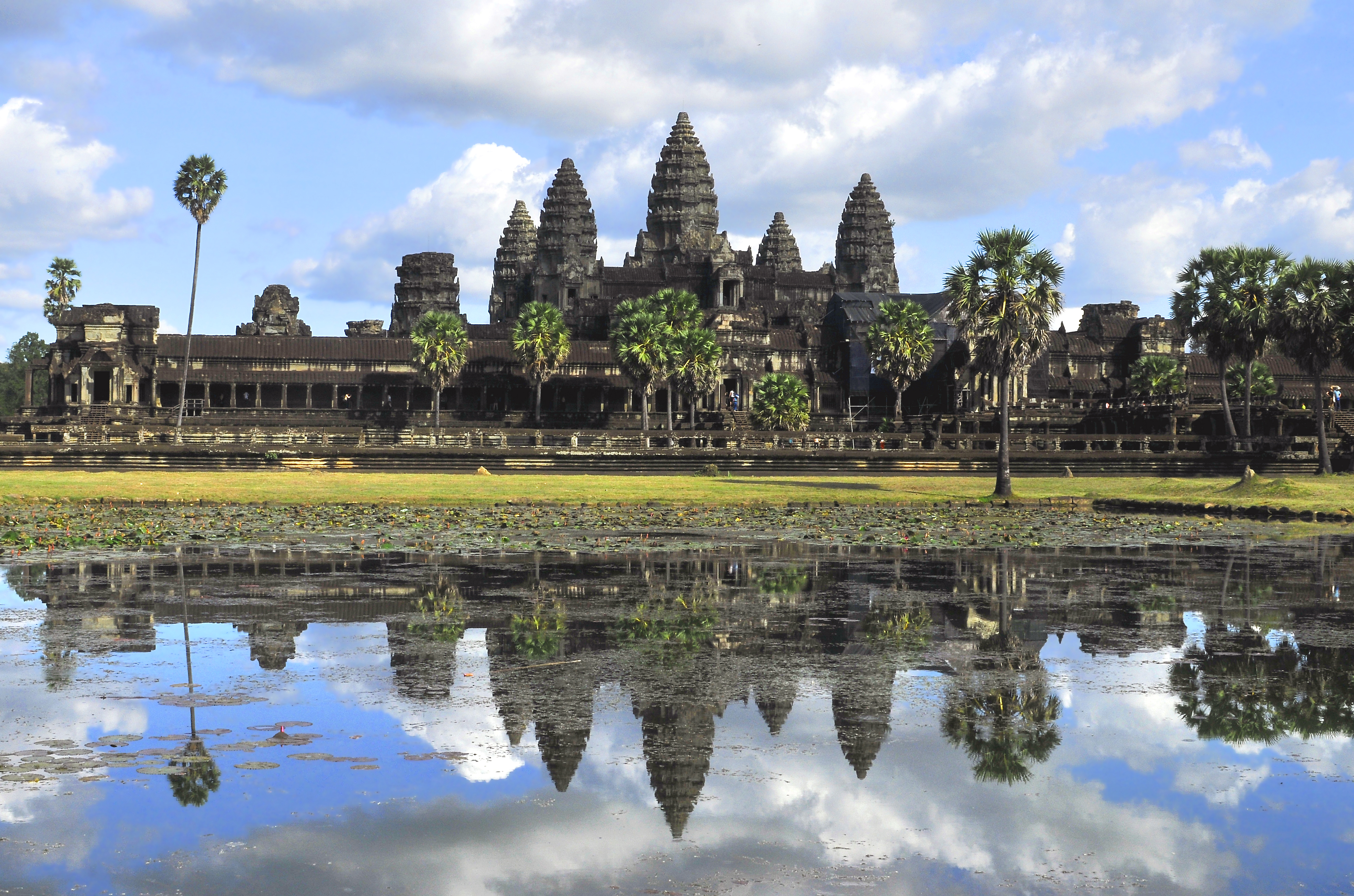
The five prang towers of Angkor Wat in Cambodia.

A prang (Khmer: ប្រាង្គ, UNGEGN: brangk, ALA-LC: prāṅg [praːŋ]; Thai: ปรางค์, RTGS: prang [prāːŋ]) is a tall tower-like spire, usually richly carved. They were a common shrine element of Hindu and Buddhist architecture in the Khmer Empire (802–1431). They were later adapted by Buddhist builders in Thailand, especially during the Ayutthaya Kingdom (1350–1767) and Rattanakosin Kingdom (1782–1932). In Thailand it appears only with the most important Buddhist temples.

== Etymology ==
The term prang is a compound of the Sanskrit terms pra- ('forward, in front') and aṅga (limb of the body), with the contacting vowels united by sandhi.

== Structure ==
A Prang tower takes the form of a multi-tiered structure with receding size as it ascends. The receding size of almost identical roof structures of the stepped pyramidal tower, creates a perspective illusion as if the tower is taller than it actually is. The form of the tower is reminiscent of the Indic shikhara of Hindu temples, although slightly different in design. On each cardinal point, a prang usually has richly adorned tympanum and lintels above doorways or blind doors. The prang follows a plan of multiple rectangular corners, which on top of each roof step are adorned with antefixes, which mostly take the theme of multi-headed Nāgas, Garudas or deities.

== History ==
=== Khmer temples ===
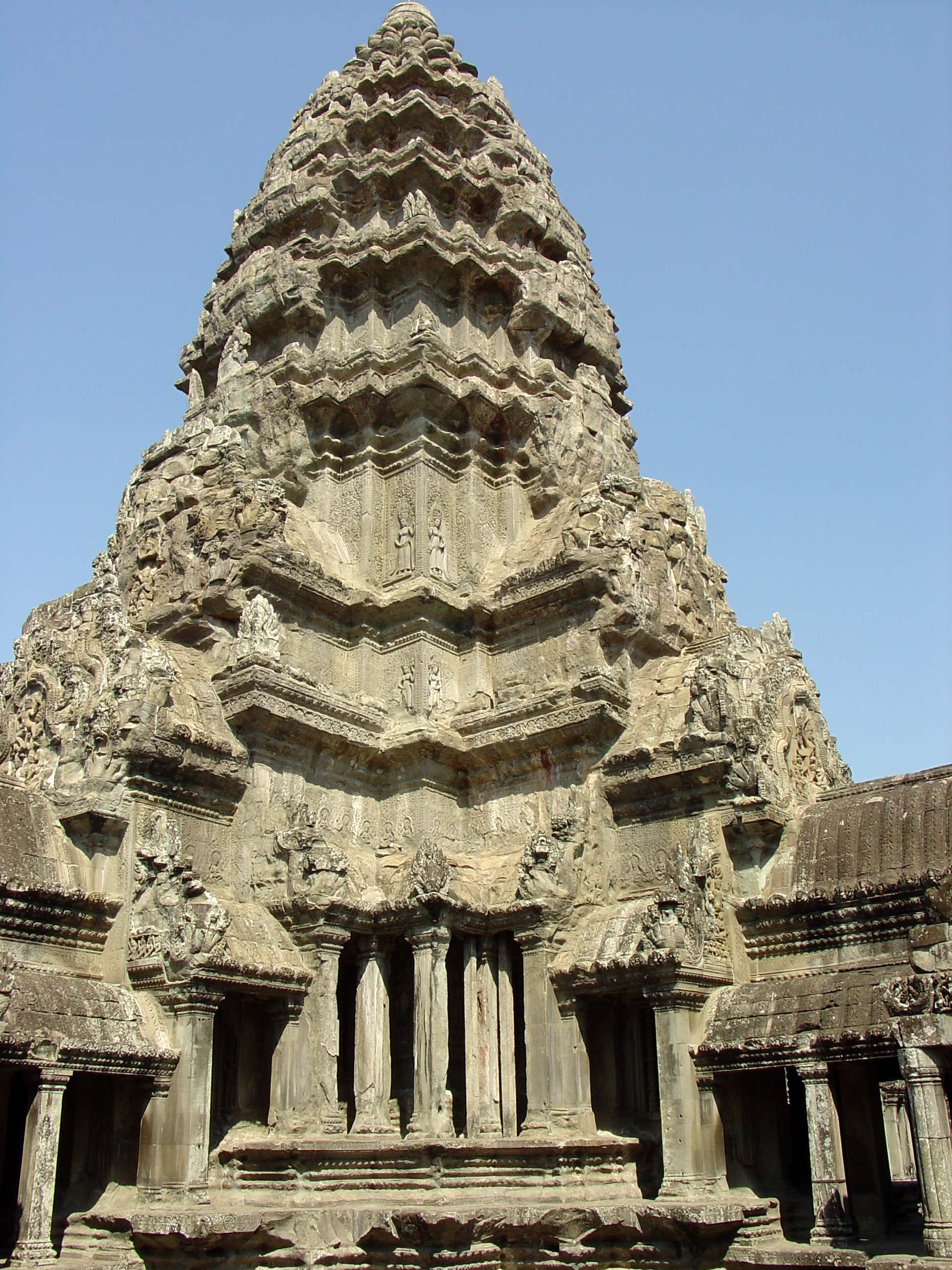
The central prang of Angkor Wat temple symbolizes the mount Meru.

Originally the Khmer prang temples were for the worship of the Hindu gods, such as Shiva and Vishnu. The space within the prang tower, the cella, was relatively small for two reasons:

1. The rituals which were held in them were reserved for a small elite (in the capital of the Khmer only the god king could enter the shrine).
2. The technology of the Khmer could not yet make large airy halls. (Ringis, 1990)

The cella was entered via a small porch, usually aligned to the east, which was called the Mandapa. Over the cubic cella rose the central tower, the bud-shaped prang, modeled after the cosmic mountain Meru, crowned by a top stone in the form of a lotus bud.

The Khmer prangs resembled north Indian temples' shikhara and rekha (temple towers) elements. The early 10th century and the late 12th century prangs in Thailand were influenced by the Khmer architects of the great temple complexes of Angkor Wat and Angkor Thom.

=== Thai temples ===
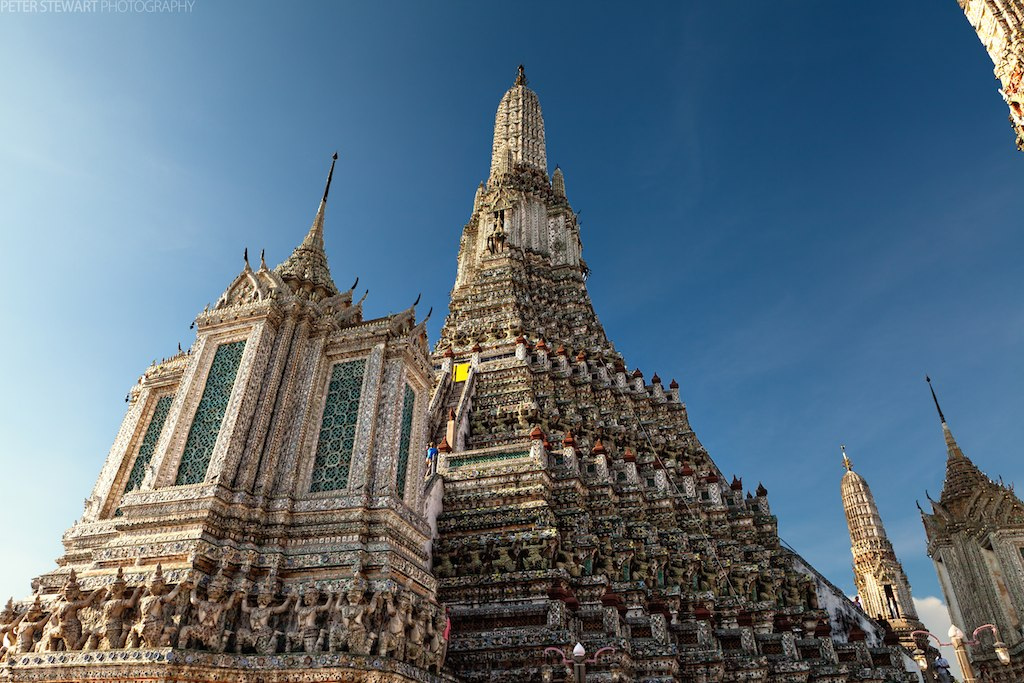
Wat Arun, a "modern" Thai style prang.

The first prangs in Thailand were built in Phimai and Khao Phnom Rung and Lopburi between the early 10th century and the late 12th century, when the Khmer kingdom was dominant.

After the Khmer Empire collapsed, the Thai building masters of the Sukhothai Kingdom adapted the Prang form. They extended and developed it. The building material was no more separate small sandstone blocks, instead the Thais built the Prang in brick or laterite covered with stucco. And the cella could be reached only by stairs. An example for this is the Prang of the Wat Mahathat in Phitsanulok. Later developments of the Prang suggested the cella only. The entrance door became a niche, in which was placed the Buddharupa (Buddha statue), which had originally taken the central position inside. For reasons of symmetry the niche was repeated on all four sides. On its pinnacle was a Trishul, the "weapon of Indra".

A "more modern" Prang is a slim construction, like an ear of corn. The best example is Wat Arun, the Khmer style landmark of Bangkok. Also Wat Phra Kaeo has six thin Prangs arranged in a row. Another example is the four Prangs arranged in all four directions around Wat Pho in Bangkok, and the five Prangs in Wat Pichayart in Thonburi.

== See also ==
- Pyatthat
- Candi of Indonesia

== Literature ==
- Rita Ringis: Thai Temples And Temple Murals. Oxford University Press 1990, ISBN 0-19-588933-9
- K.I. Matics: Introduction To The Thai Temple. White Lotus Bangkok 1992, ISBN 974-8495-42-6
