= Ayutthaya Historical Park =

Historical park in Thailand

Historic City of Ayutthaya
UNESCO World Heritage Site
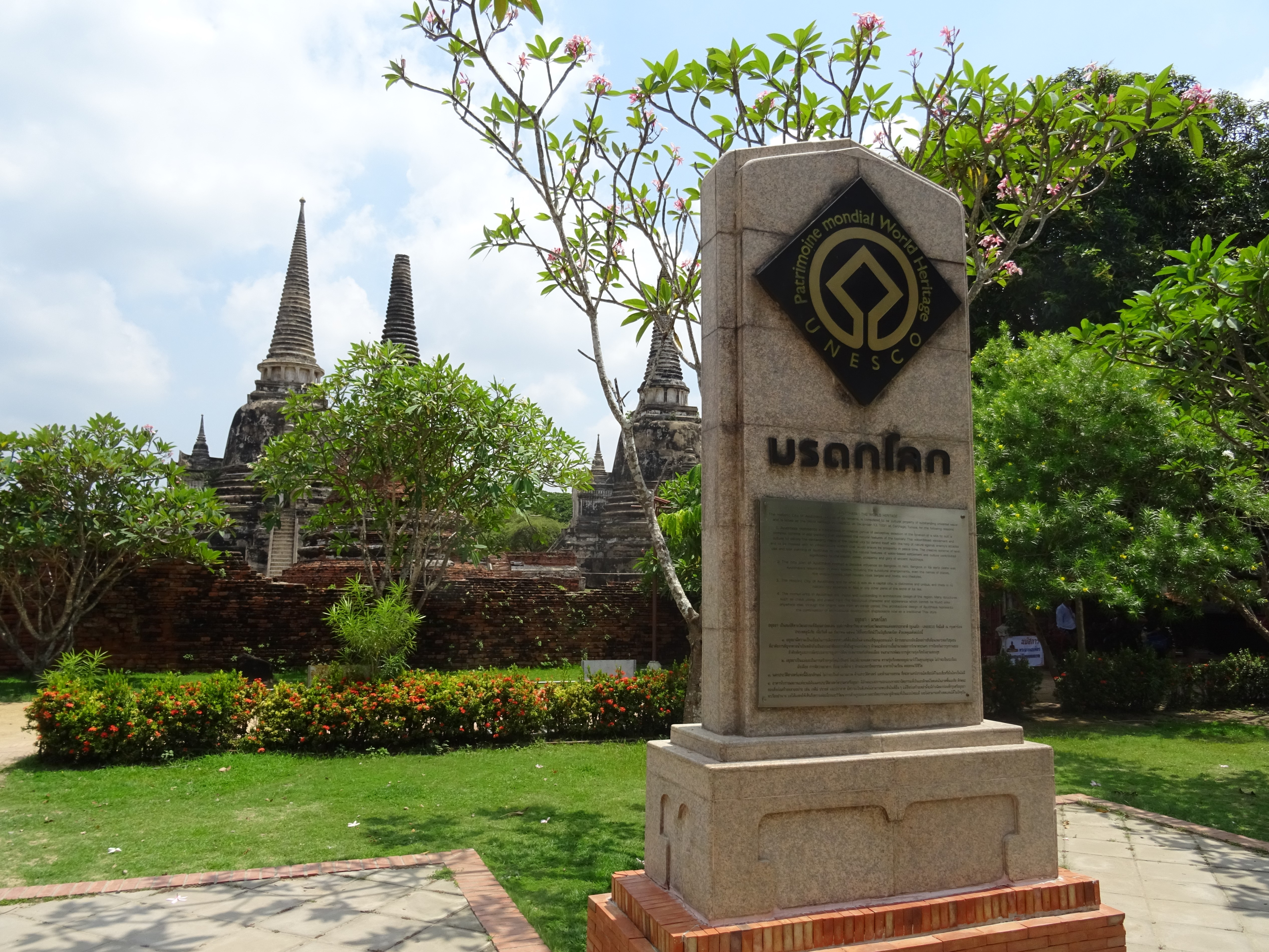
- UNESCO sign at the Ayutthaya Historical Park

- Location within Thailand
- Location: Ayutthaya, Thailand
- Criteria: Cultural: iii
- Reference: 576
- Inscription: 1991 (15th Session)
- Area: 289 ha (710 acres)
- Coordinates: 14°20′52″N 100°33′38″E

A map showing major temples and palaces within Ayutthaya Historical Park

Ayutthaya Historical Park (Thai: อุทยานประวัติศาสตร์พระนครศรีอยุธยา (Pronunciation)) covers the ruins of the old city of Ayutthaya, Phra Nakhon Si Ayutthaya province, Thailand. The city of Ayutthaya was founded by King Ramathibodi I in 1351,^{[a]} though it is likely to be significantly older, based on evidence showing that the area was already populated during the Mon Dvaravati period. Sources further mention that around 850 AD, the Khmers occupied the area and established a stronghold there, naming it Ayodhya, after one of the holiest Hindu cities in India of the same name. The early history of Ayutthaya is connected to this Khmer settlement. Additionally, Prince Damrong has also attested to the existence of a city named Ayodhya, founded by the Khmers ruling from Lopburi at the point where the three rivers meet. An excavation map shows traces of an ancient baray (water reservoir) close to the southwestern tip of Wat Yai Chai Mongkhon, which could have been built on a former important Khmer temple complex.

The city was captured by the Burmese in 1569. Though not pillaged, it lost "many valuable and artistic objects". It was the capital of the country until its destruction by the Burmese army in 1767.

In 1969, the Fine Arts Department of Thailand began renovations of the ruins, scaling up the project after the site was declared a historical park in 1976. Part of the park was declared a UNESCO World Heritage Site in 1991.

== Park sites ==
=== World Heritage core zone ===
The following monuments are located within the inscribed core zone of the Historic City of Ayutthaya, a UNESCO World Heritage Site since 1991.

- Wat Mahathat
- Wat Ratchaburana, Ayutthaya
- Wat Phra Si Sanphet
- Wat Phra Ram
- Wat Thammikarat
- Wat Lokayasutharam
- Wihan Phra Mongkhon Bopit
- Phra Chedi Suriyothai
- Ayutthaya Historical Study Centre

=== Park sites (buffer zone) ===
The following sites lie outside the inscribed area but within the Ayutthaya Historical Park.

- Wat Chaiwatthanaram
- Wat Kasattrattrathirat
- Wat Kudi Dao
- Wat Phanan Choeng
- Wat Yai Chai Mongkhon
- Wat Phu Khao Thong
- Japanese village
- Baan Hollanda (Dutch village)
- Elephant camp

== Gallery ==
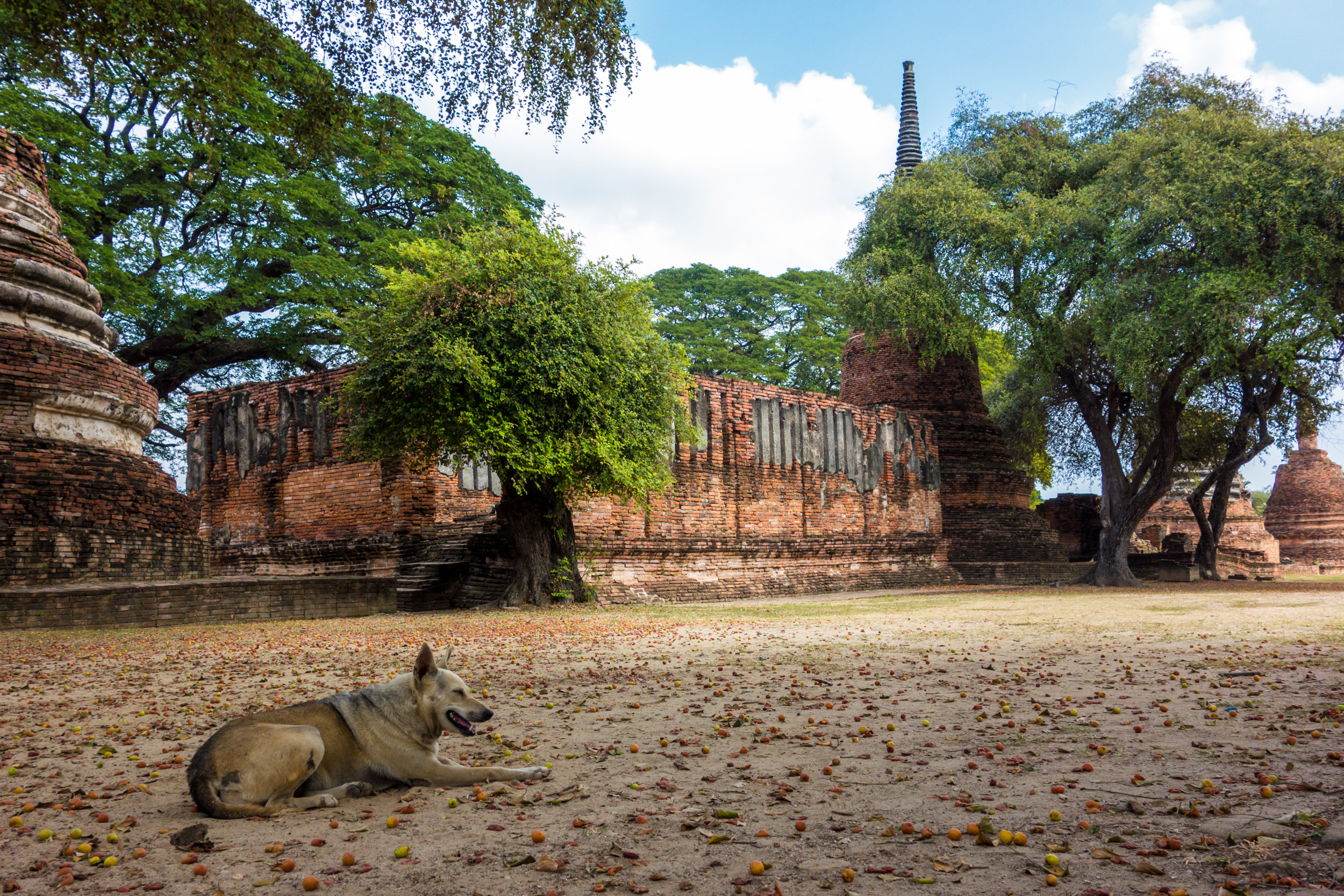
Ruins inside Ayutthaya Historical Park

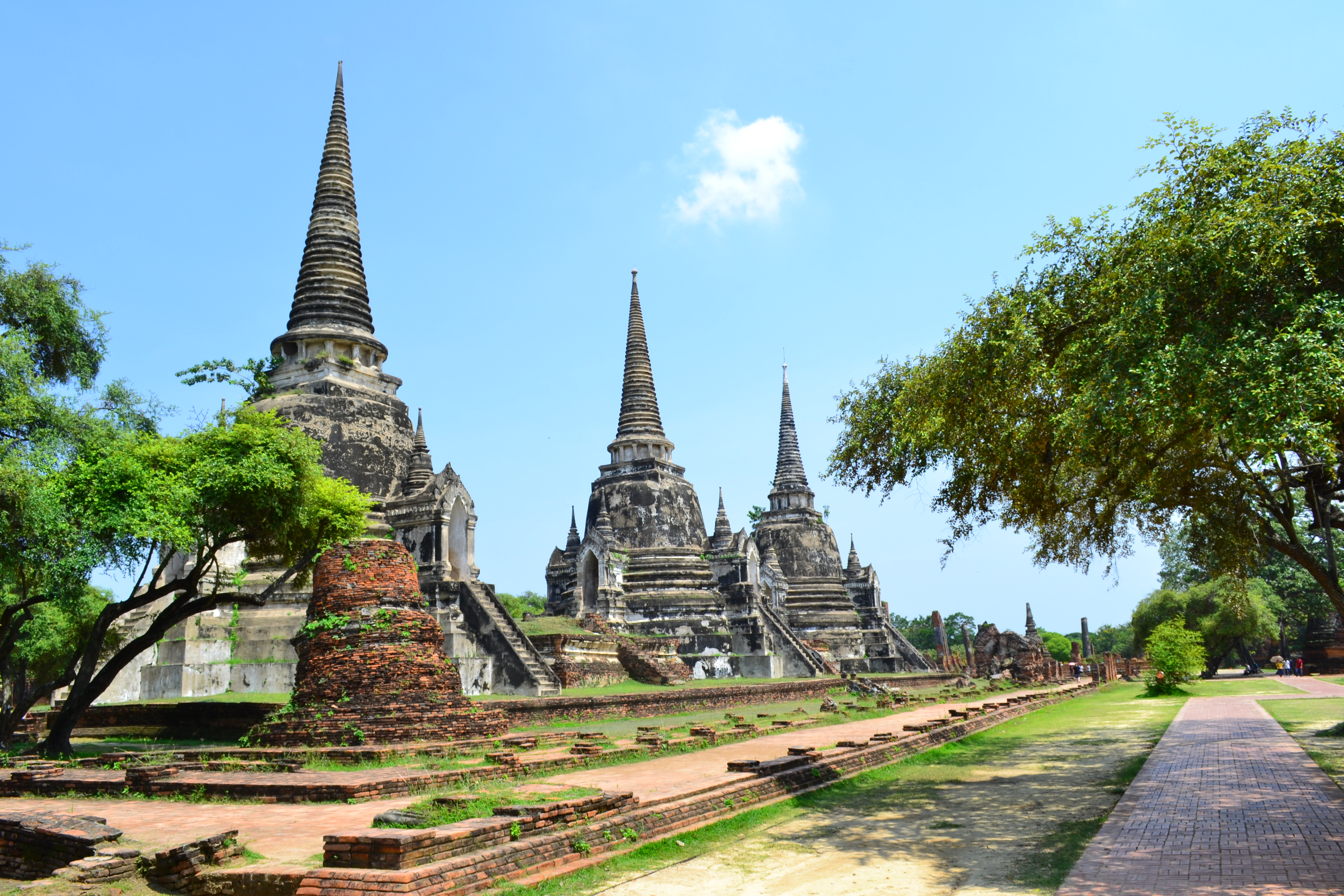
Wat Phra Si Sanphet

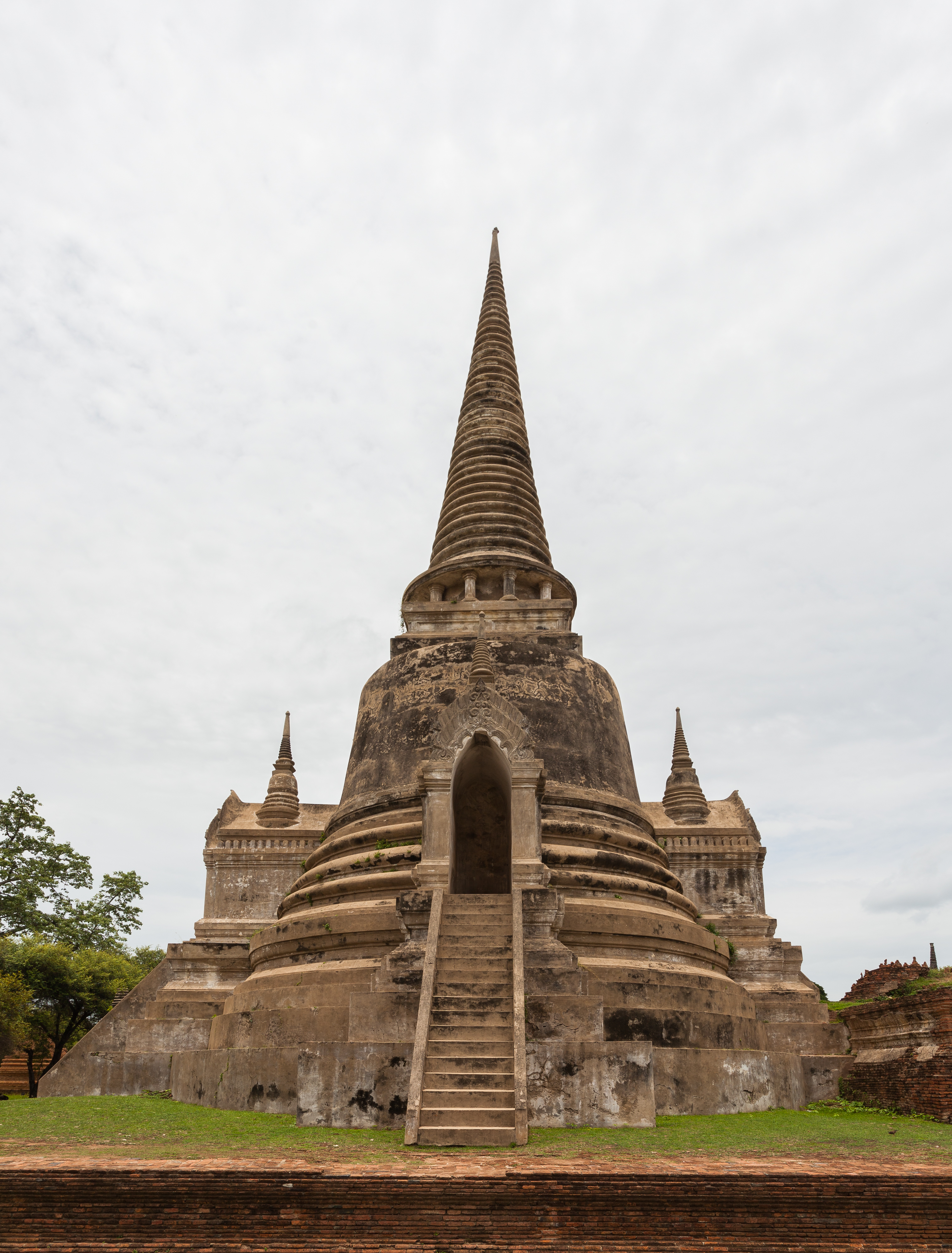
Chedi of Wat Phra Sri Sanphet

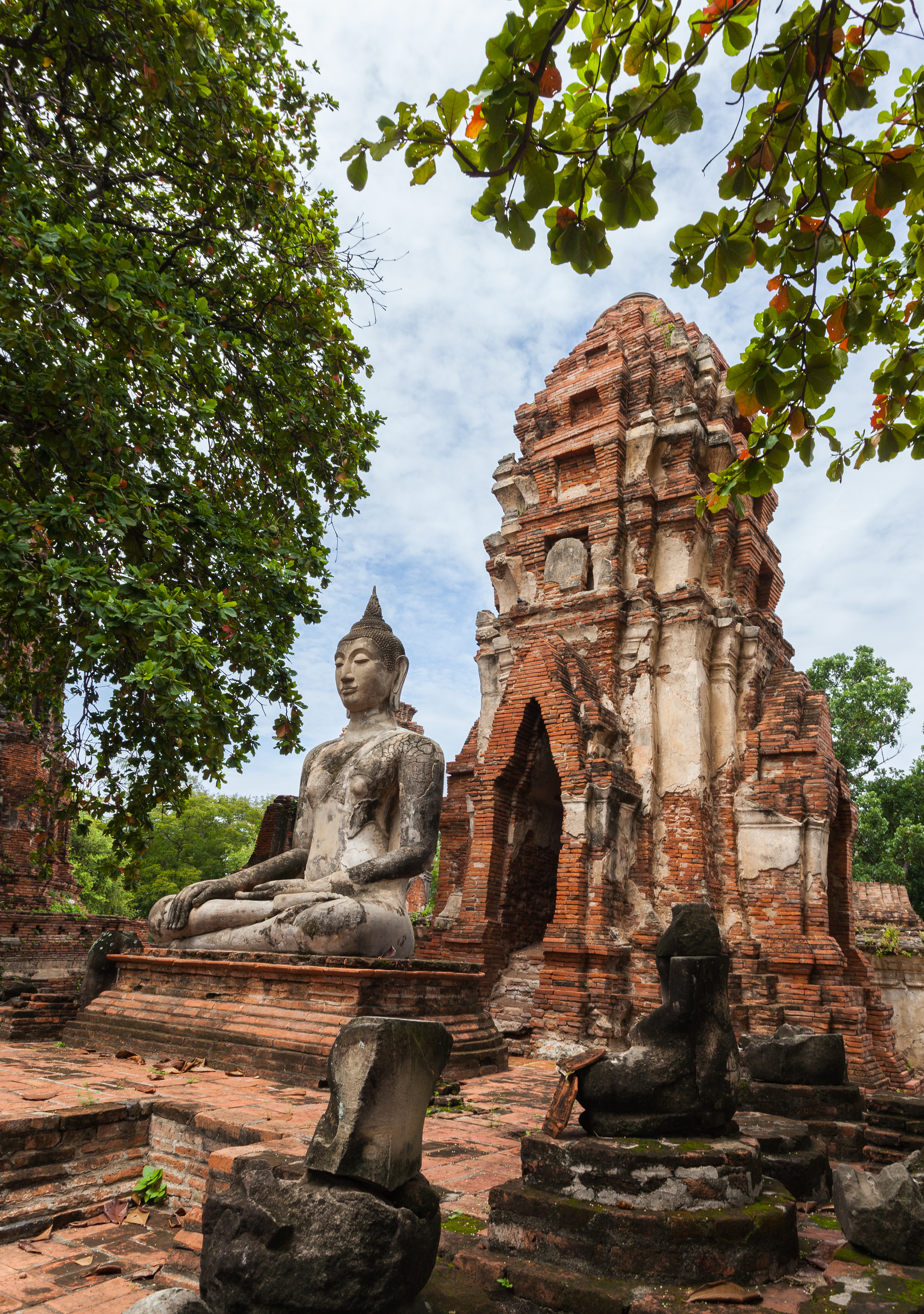
Wat Mahathat

The head of Buddha, Wat Mahathat

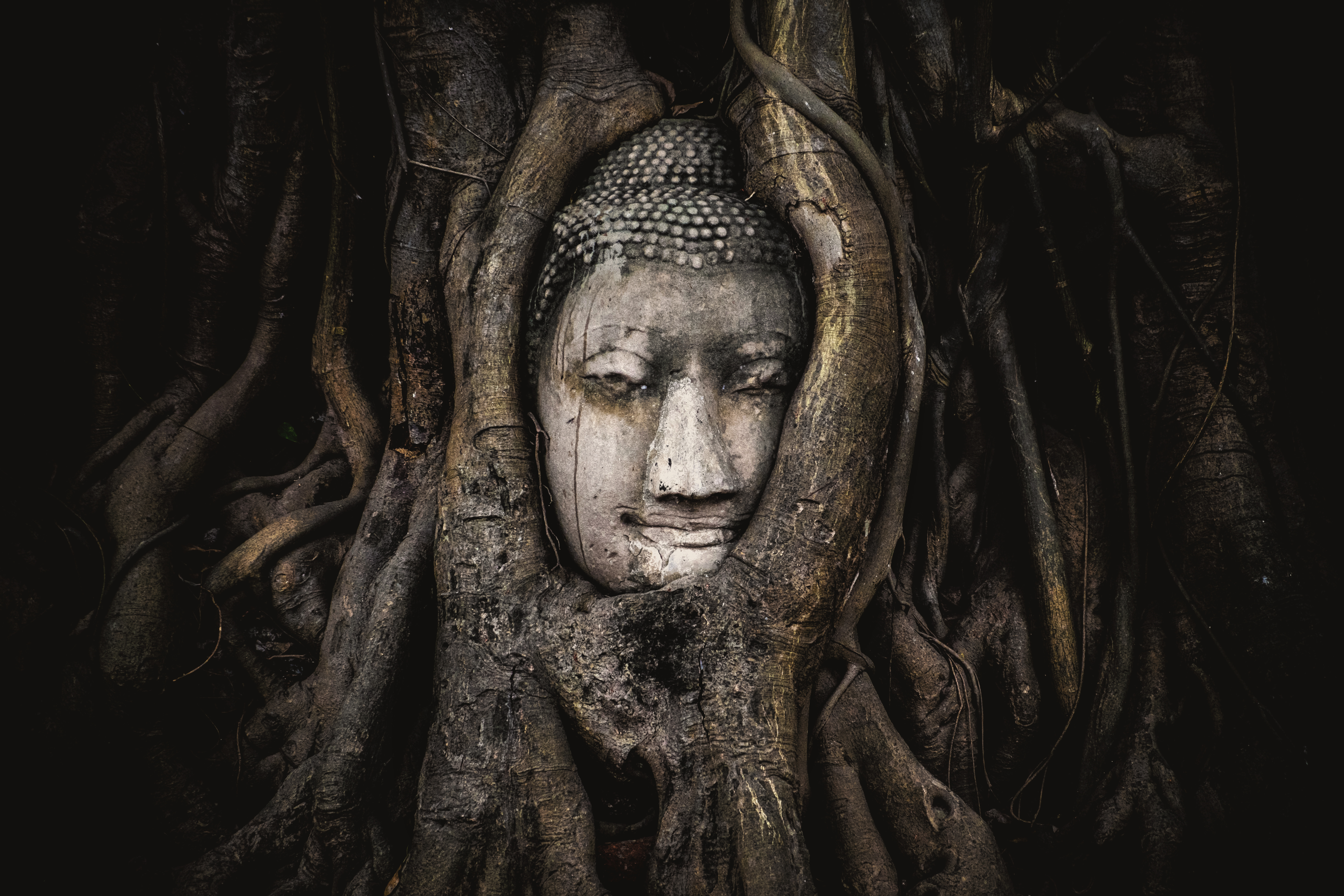
The Buddha head in tree roots

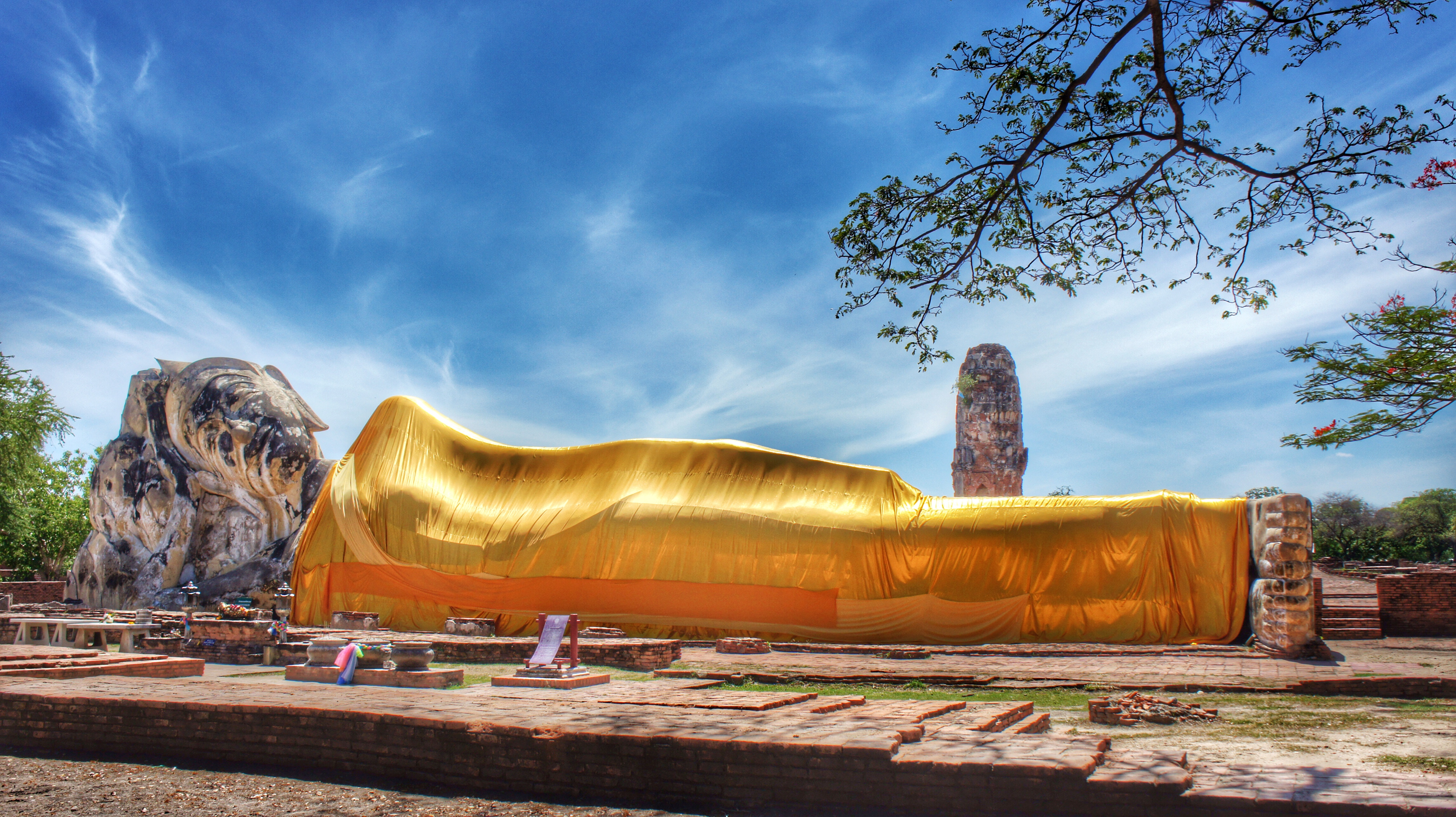
Reclining Buddha at Wat Lokayasutharam

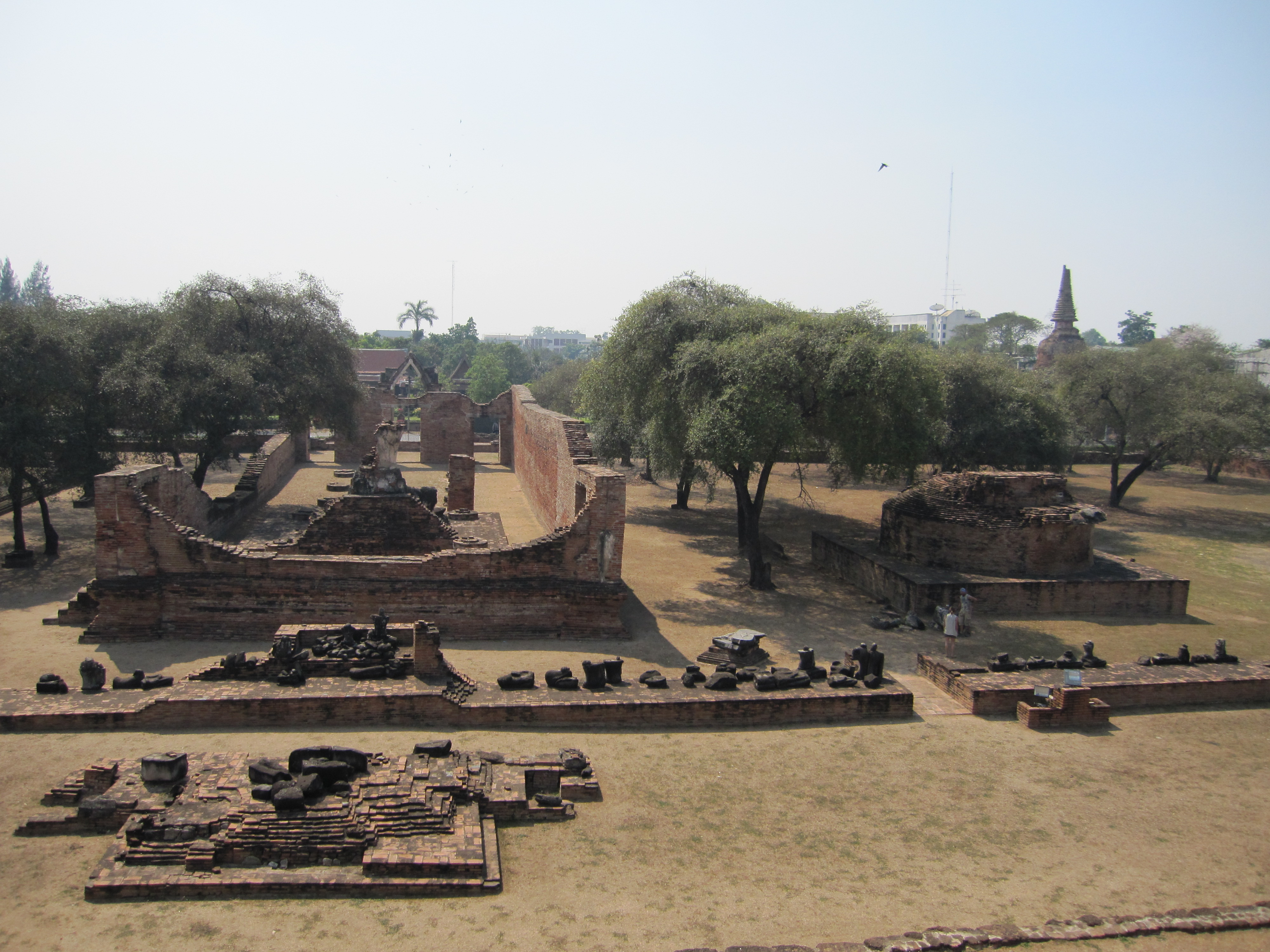
Wat Ratchaburana

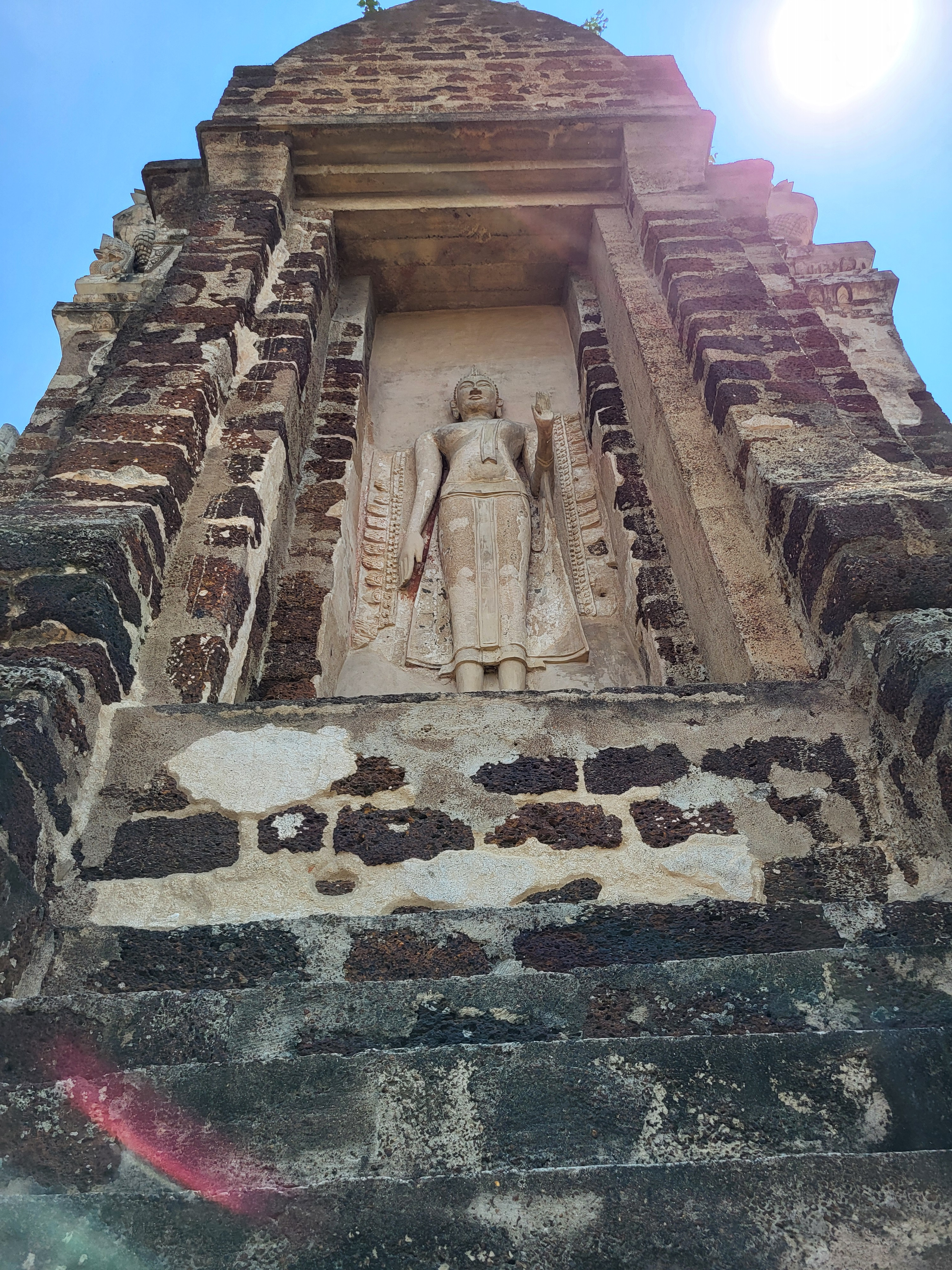
Buddha on the prang of Wat Ratchaburana

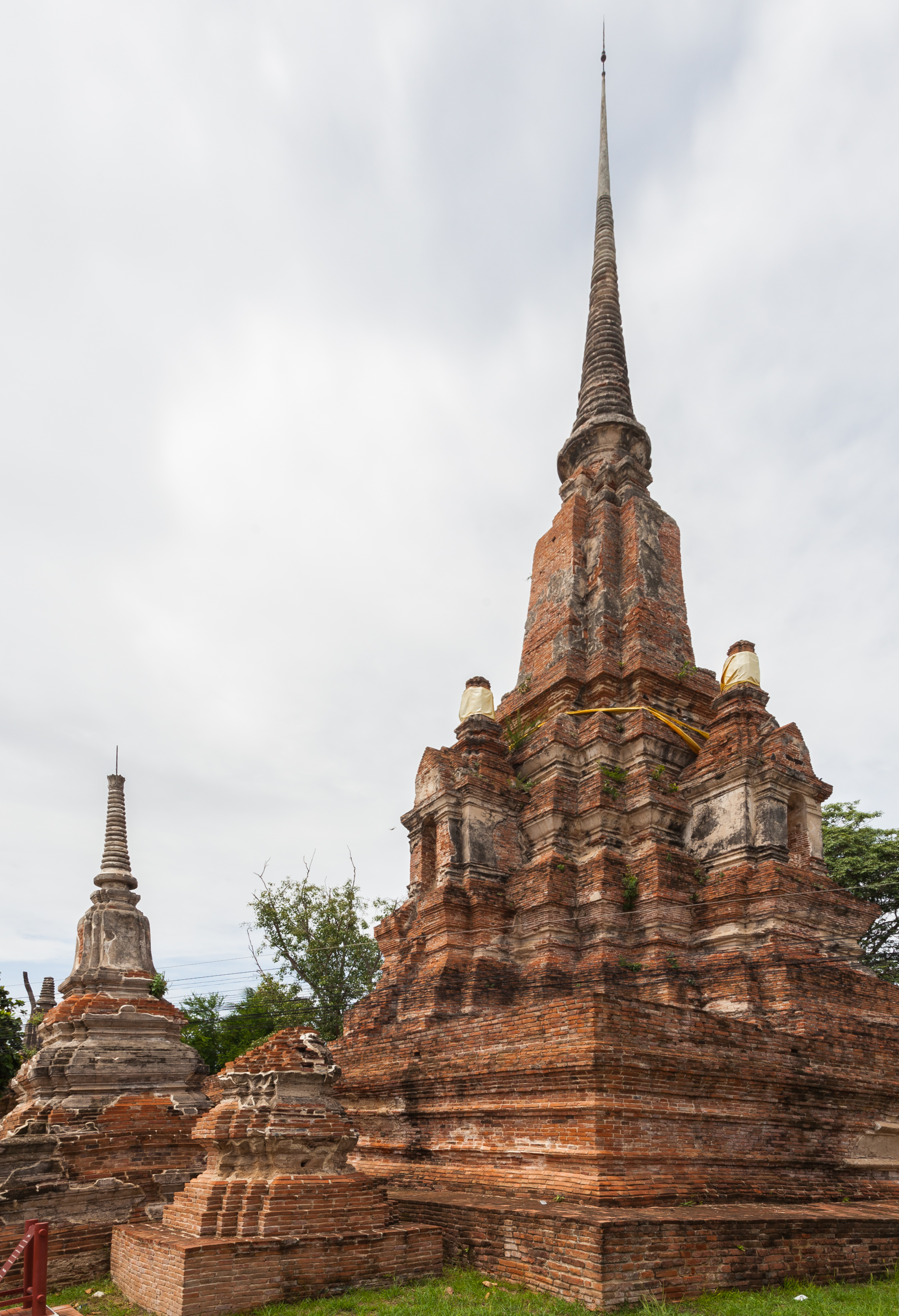
Wat Yanasen

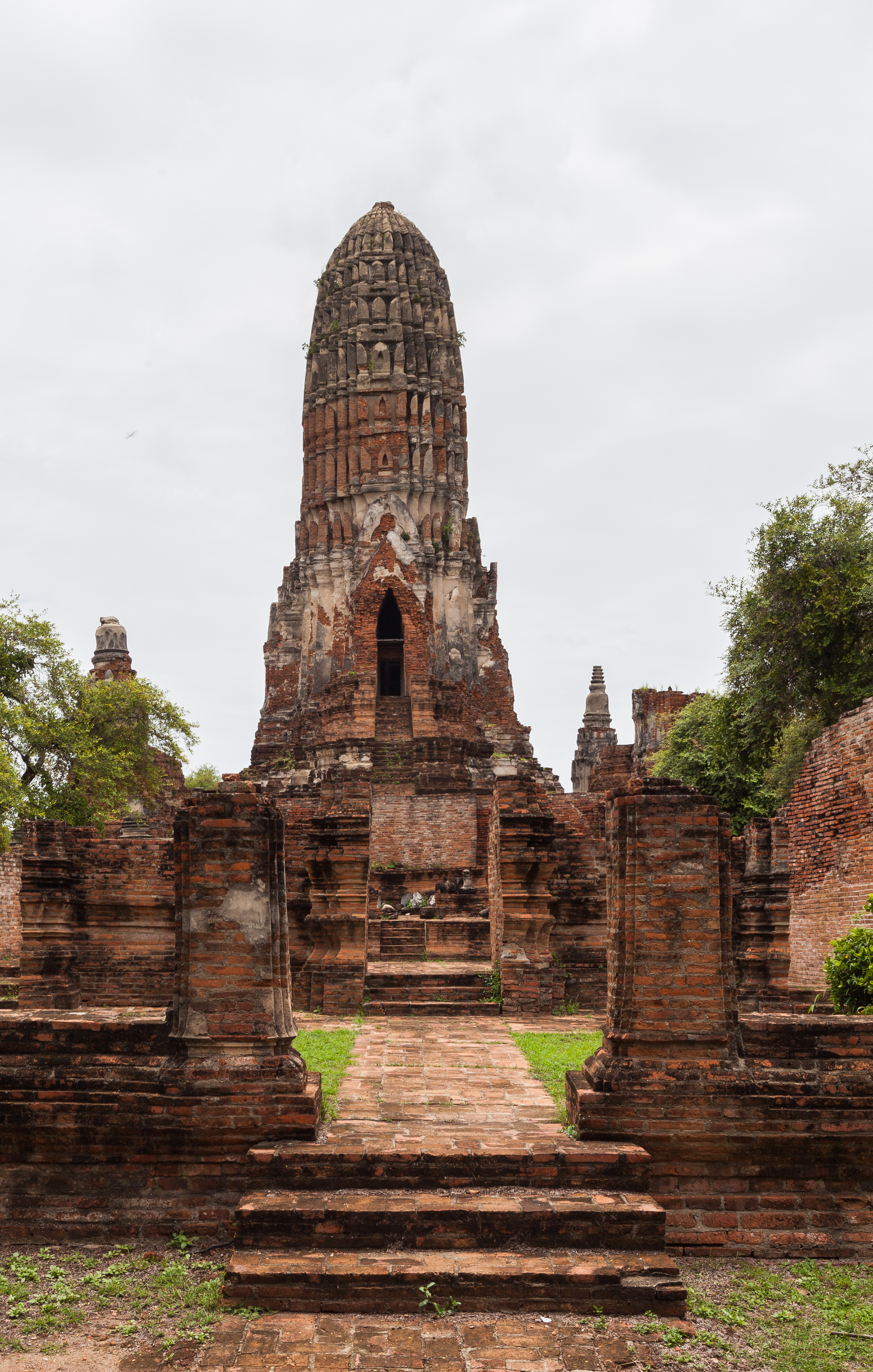
Wat Phra Ram

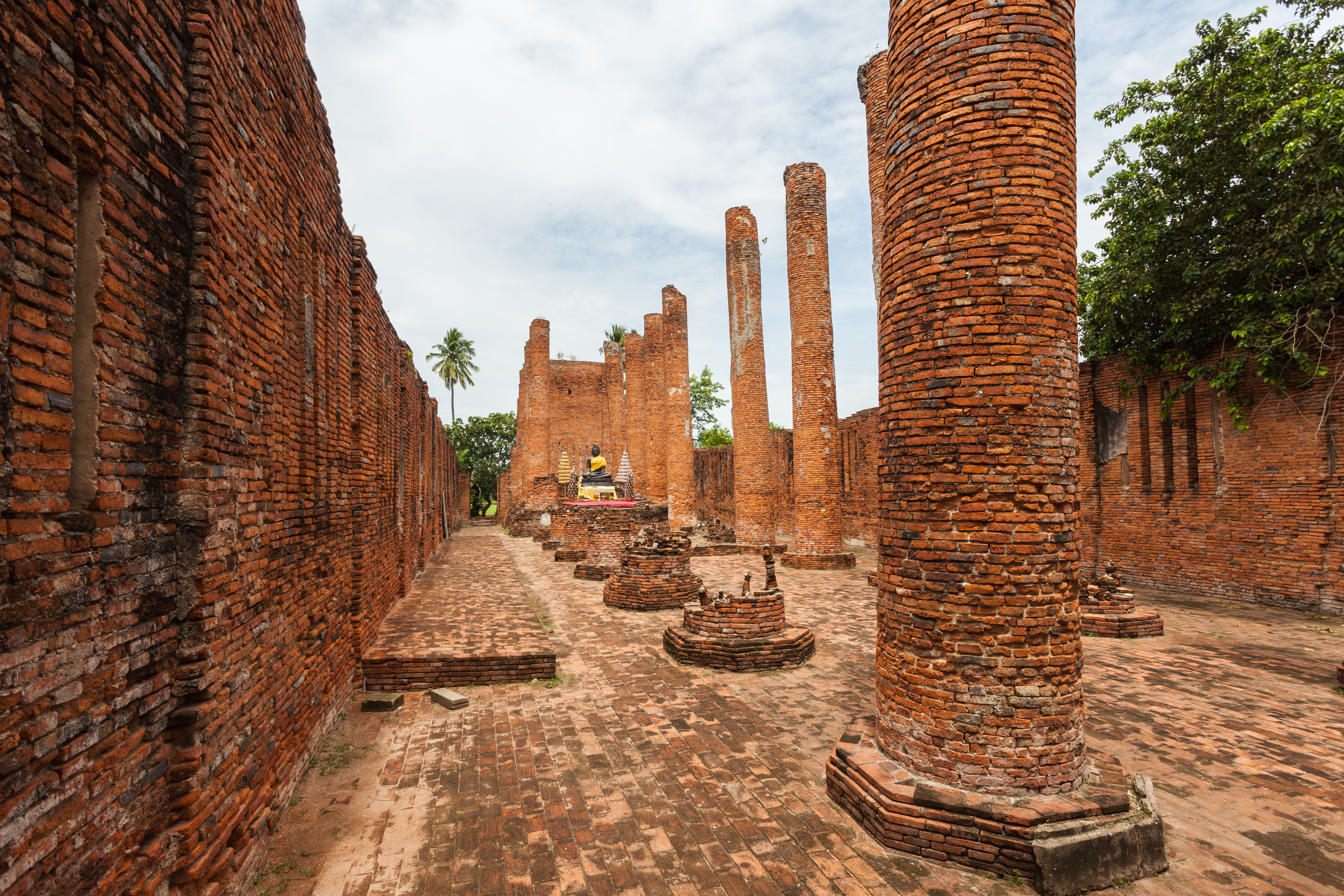
Wat Thammikarat

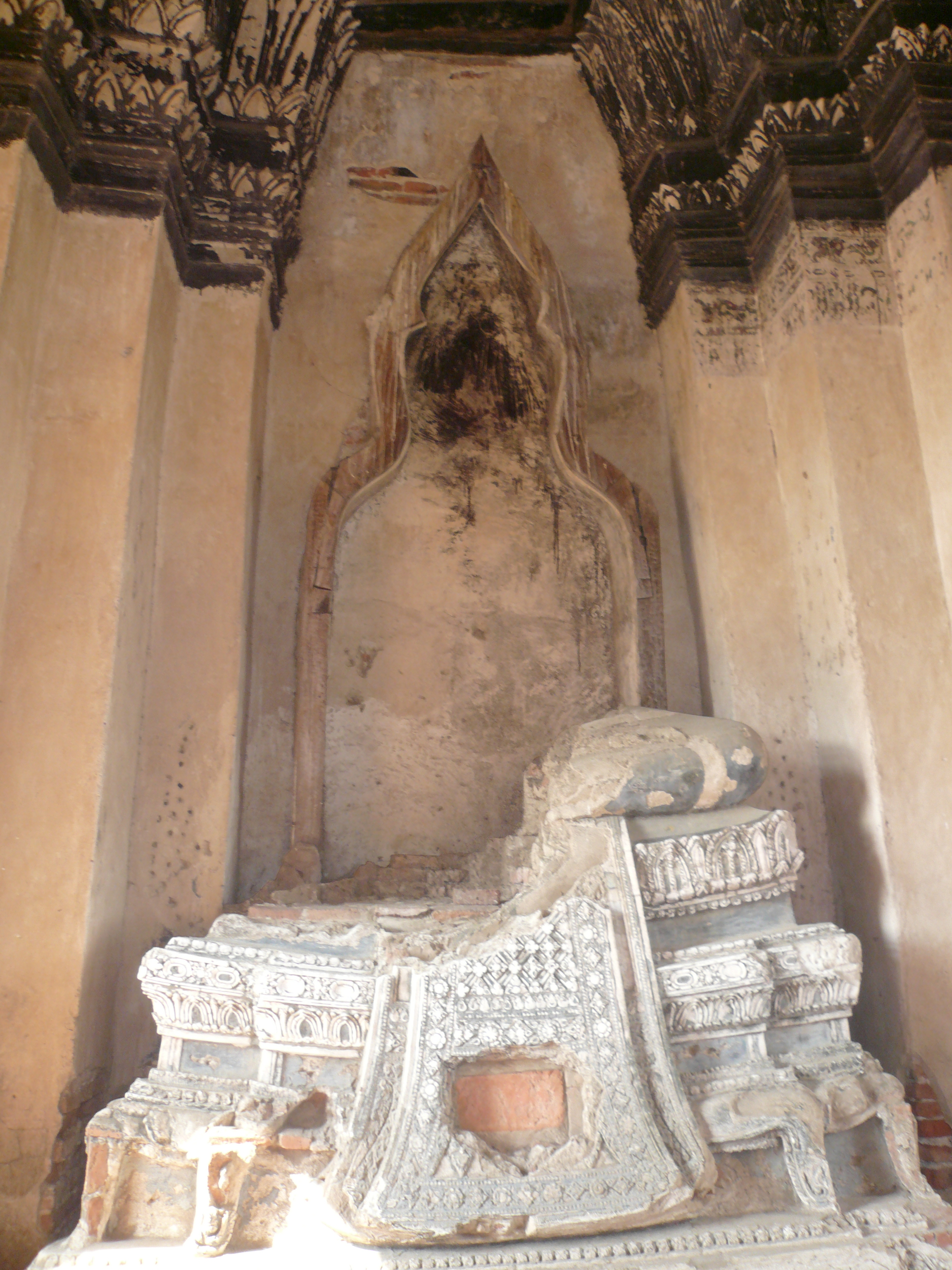
Altar in Wat Chaiwatthanaram

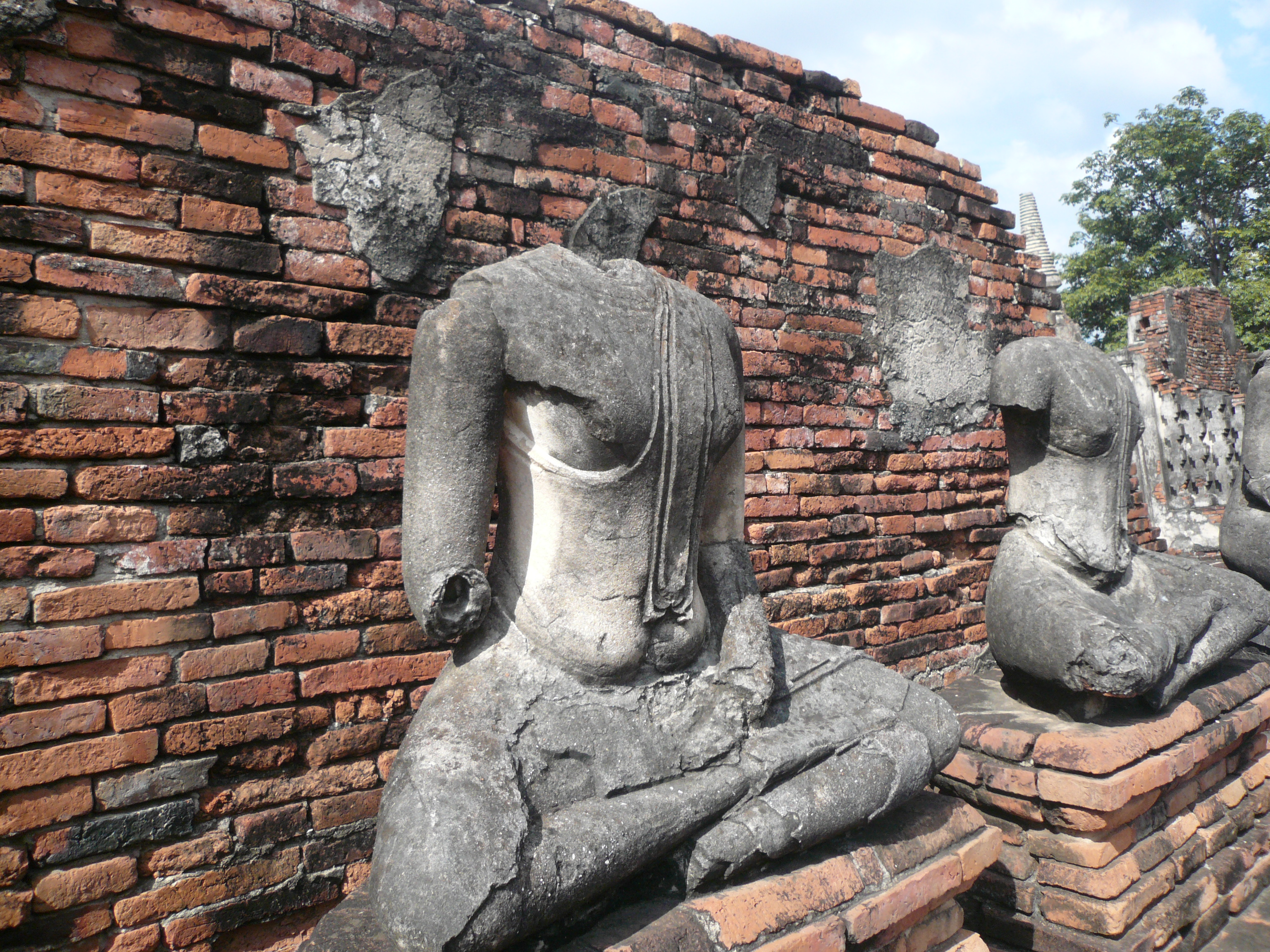
Headless statues

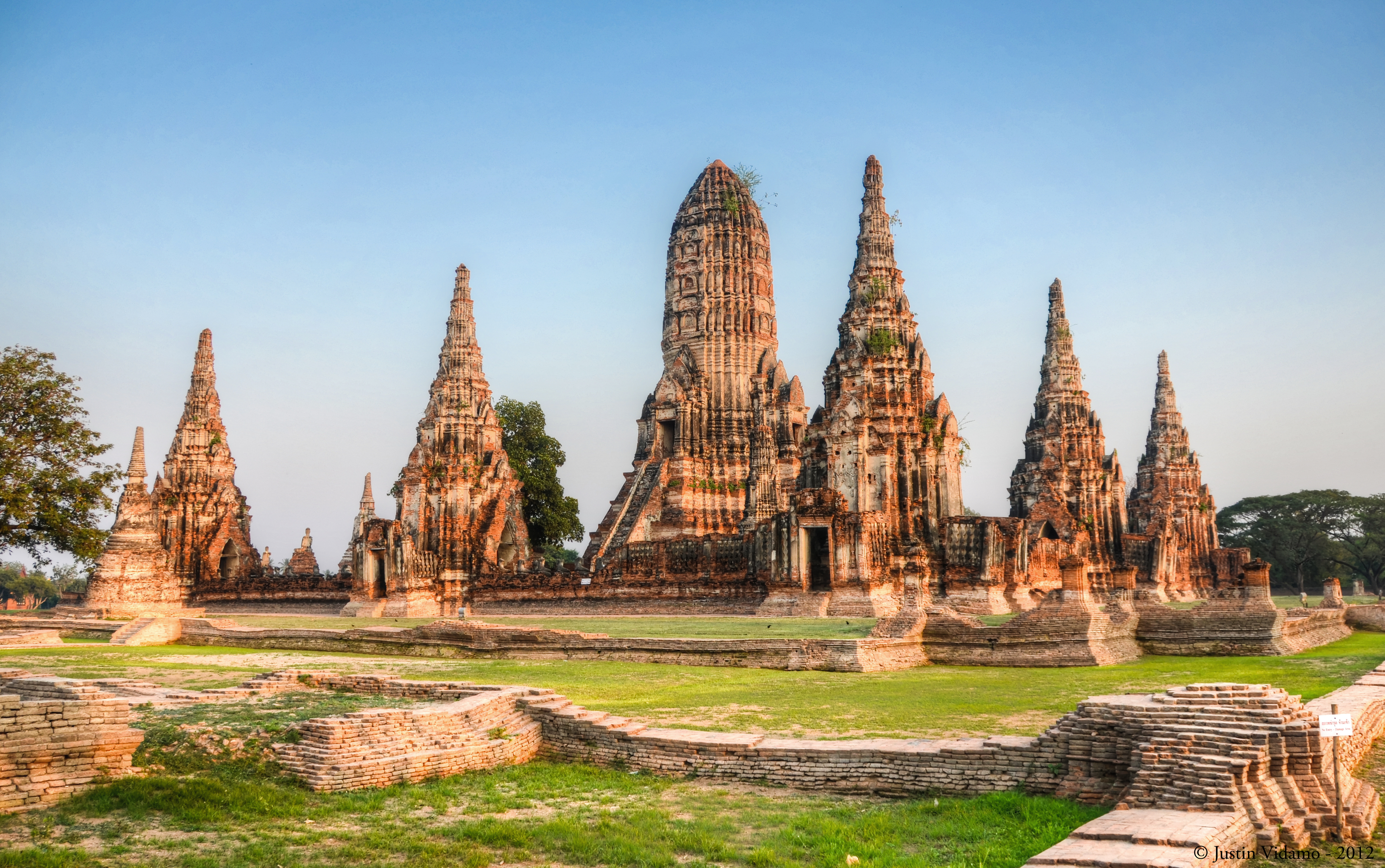
Wat Chaiwatthanaram

== See also ==
- History of Thailand
- List of World Heritage Sites in Thailand
- Ayutthaya Kingdom
- Si Satchanalai Historical Park
- Sukhothai Historical Park
- Si Thep Historical Park
- Phu Phra Bat Historical Park
- Ban Chiang

== Notes ==
- ^{a} The city was founded on Friday, the 6th day of the waxing moon of the 5th month, 1893 Buddhist Era, corresponding to Friday, 4 March 1351 Common Era, according to the calculation of the Fine Arts Department of Thailand.
