= Wihan Phra Mongkhon Bophit =

Buddhist temple in Ayutthaya province, Thailand

- วิหารพระมงคลบพิตร
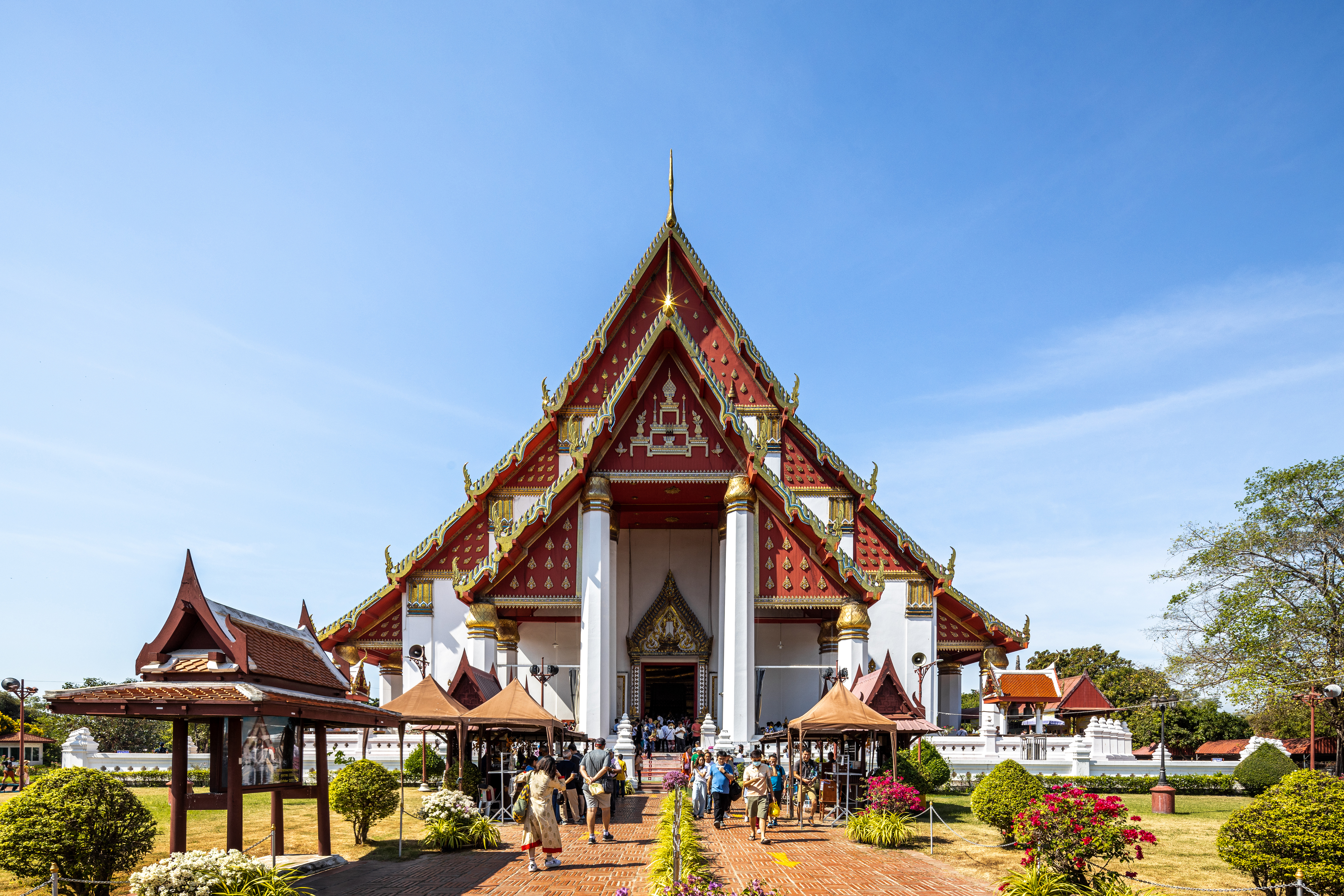

Religion
- Affiliation: Buddhism

Location
- Location: Pratu Chai, Phra Nakhon Si Ayutthaya District, Phra Nakhon Si Ayutthaya
- Country: Thailand
- Interactive map of Wihan Phra Mongkhon Bophit
- Coordinates: 14°21′18″N 100°33′28″E

Architecture
- Founder: Unknown

Wihan Phra Mongkhon Bophit (Thai: วิหารพระมงคลบพิตร), is a Buddhist temple in Phra Nakhon Si Ayutthaya district, Phra Nakhon Si Ayutthaya province. Located south of Wat Phra Si Sanphet, it is part of the Ayutthaya Historical Park.

The seated Buddha image, Phra Mongkhon Bopit (Thai: พระมงคลบพิตร), enshrined in the chapel, is approximately 13 meters high. The statue is made of brick and bronze and is currently covered in gold leaf.

== Gallery ==
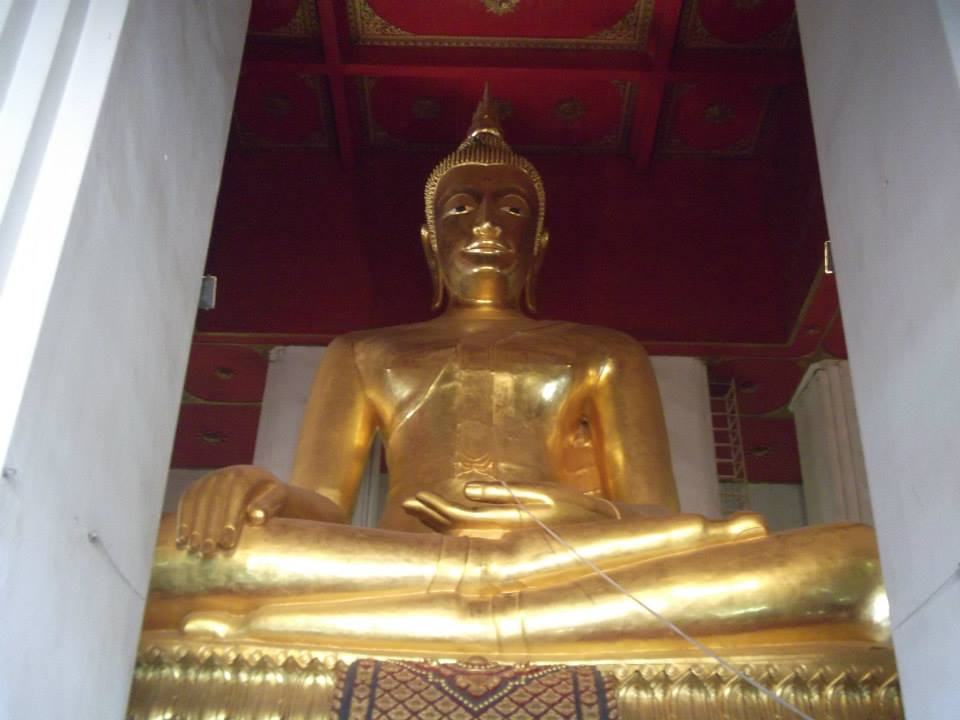

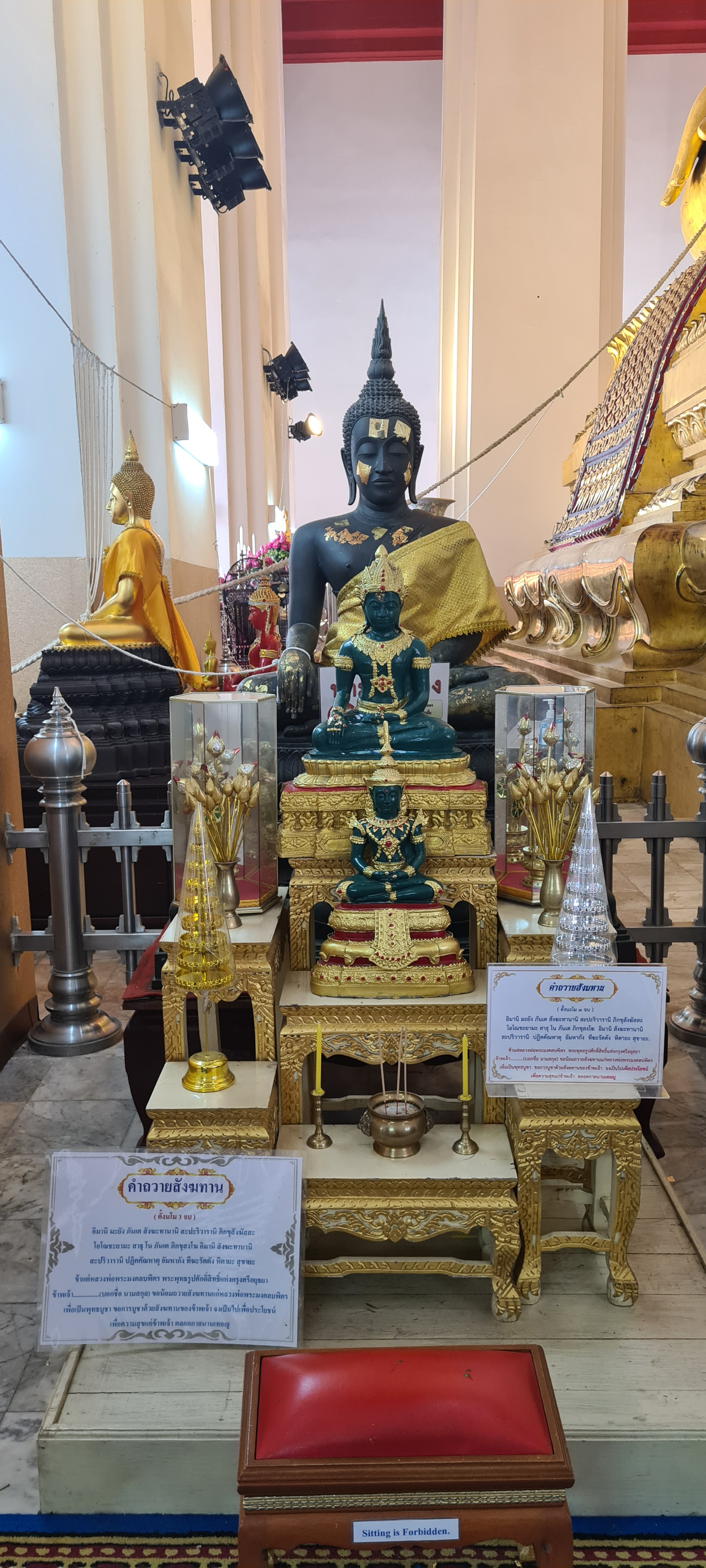
