= Wat Lokayasutharam =

Buddhist temple in Ayutthaya province, Thailand

- วัดโลกยสุธาราม
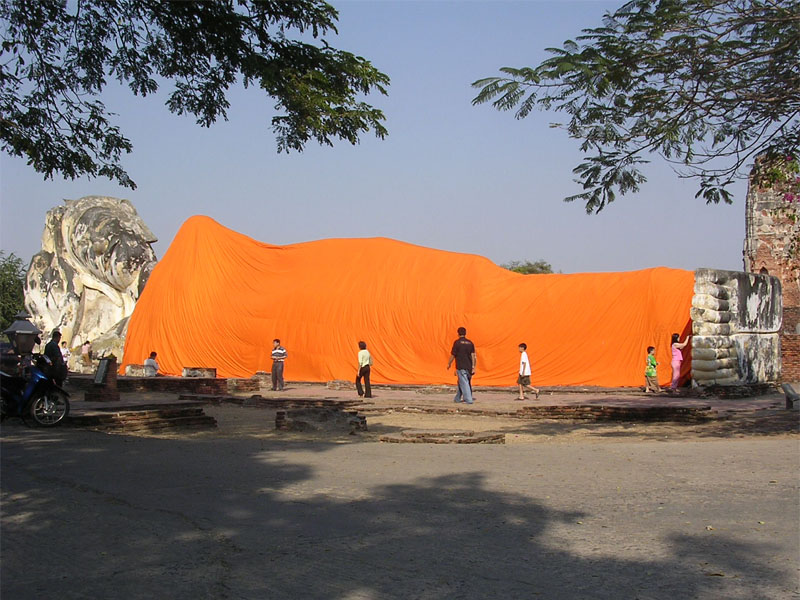

Religion
- Affiliation: Buddhism

Location
- Location: Pratu Chai, Phra Nakhon Si Ayutthaya District, Phra Nakhon Si Ayutthaya
- Country: Thailand
- Interactive map of Wat Lokayasutharam
- Coordinates: 14°21′20″N 100°33′09″E

Architecture
- Founder: Unknown

Wat Lokayasutharam, also written as Wat Lokkayasutha or Wat Lokaya Sutha (Thai: วัดโลกยสุธาราม), is a Buddhist temple in Phra Nakhon Si Ayutthaya district, Phra Nakhon Si Ayutthaya province. There is a Buddha statue that is 37 meters long and 8 meters high.

== Gallery ==
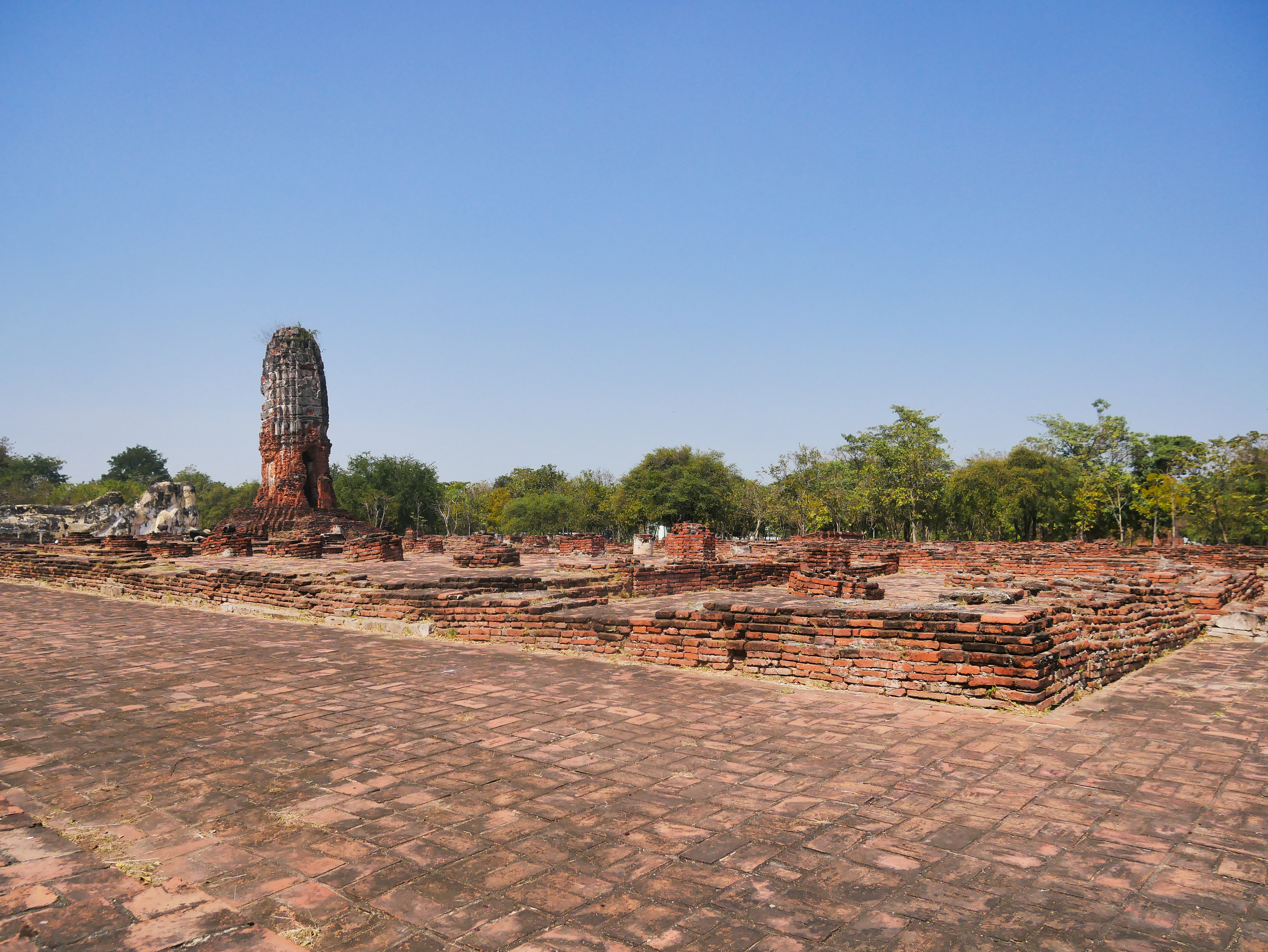

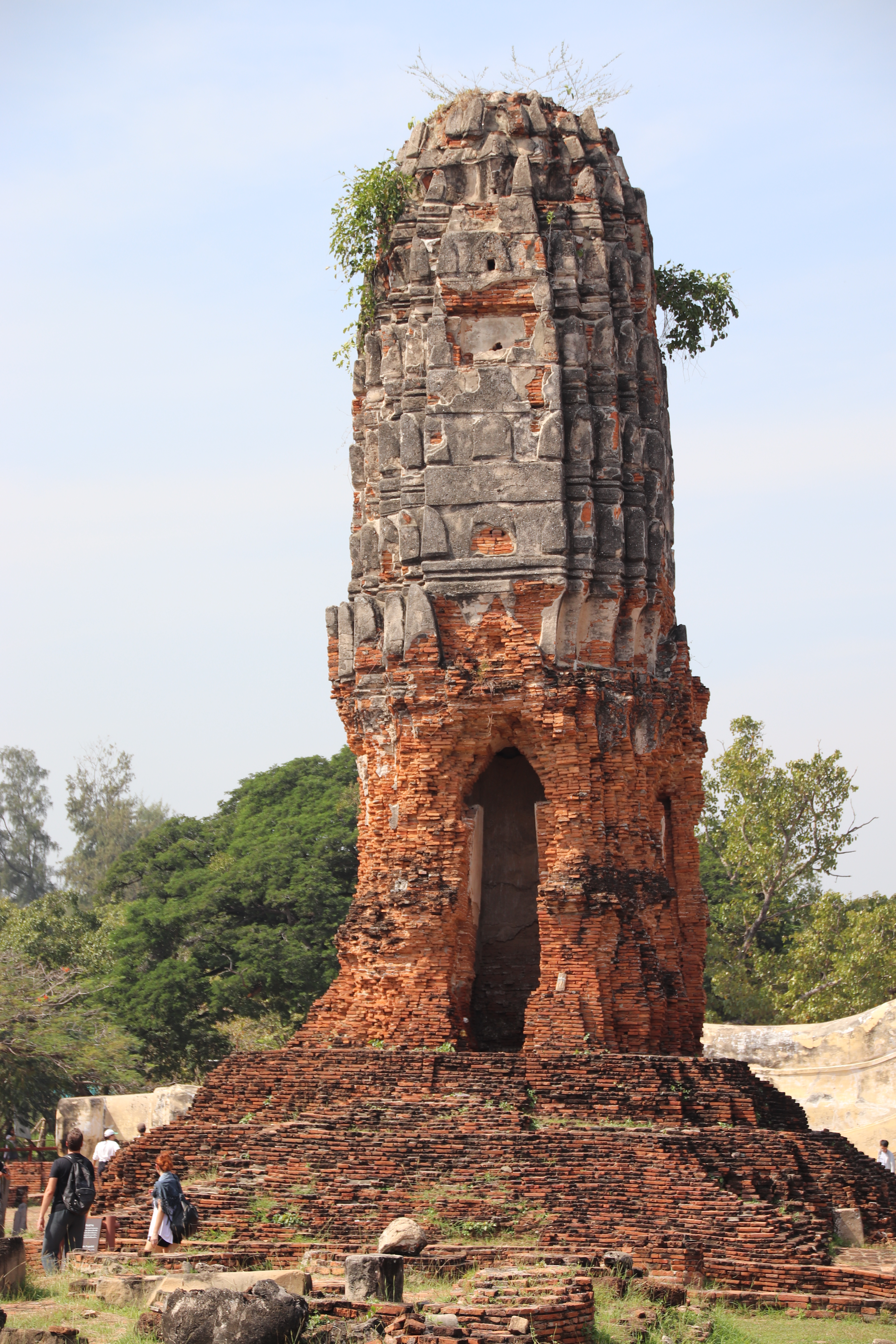
