= Wat Yai Chai Mongkhon =

Buddhist temple in Ayutthaya, Thailand

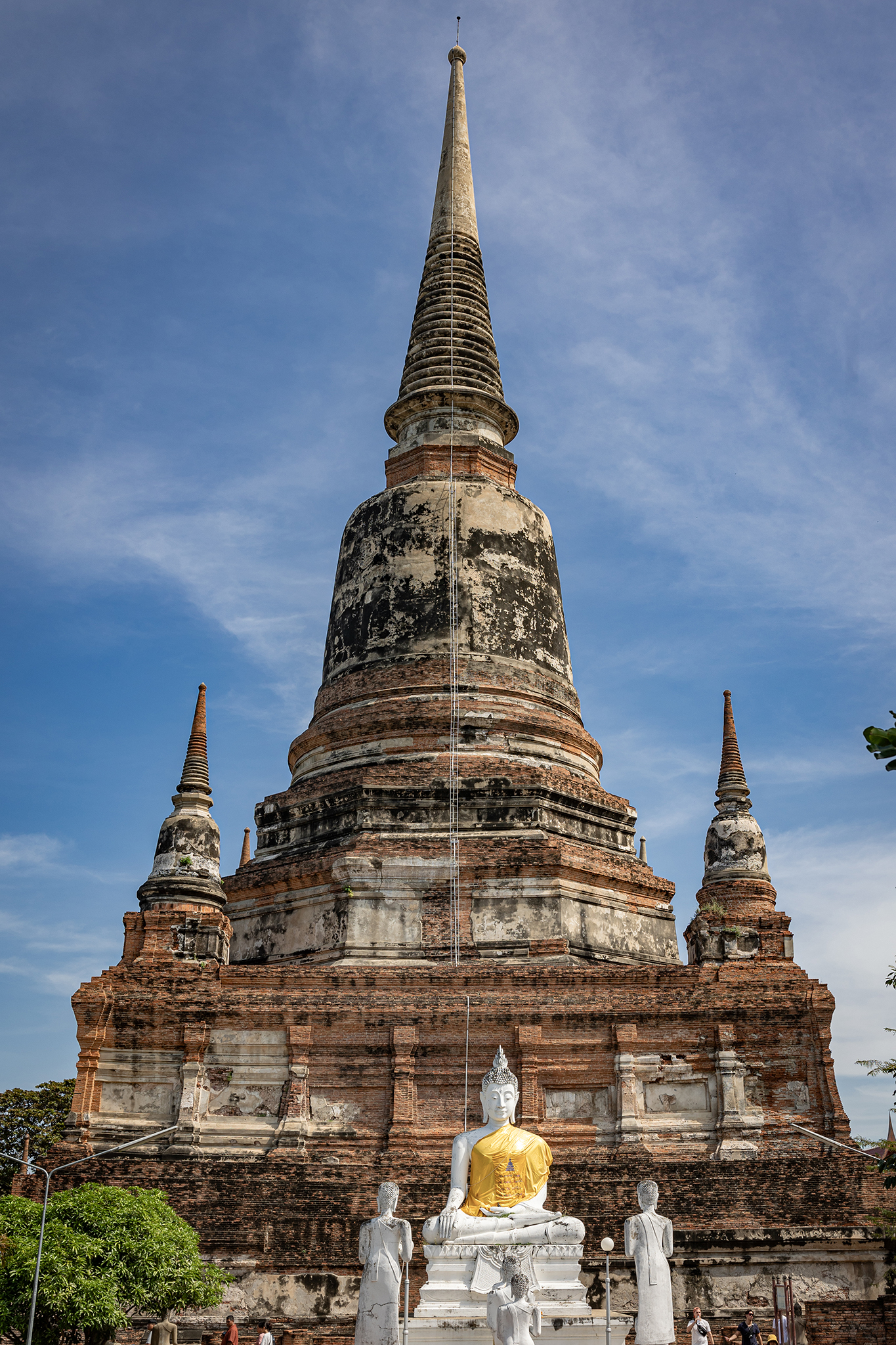

- Location within Thailand

Religion
- Affiliation: Buddhism

Location
- Location: Ayutthaya
- Country: Thailand
- Interactive map of Wat Yai Chai Mongkhon
- Coordinates: 14°20′43″N 100°35′33″E

Wat Yai Chai Mongkhon (Thai: วัดใหญ่ชัยมงคล) is a Buddhist temple located in Ayutthaya, Thailand. It is notable for having the tallest chedi (pagoda) in the city.

== History ==
The monastery was constructed by King U-Thong in 1357 AD to accommodate the monks that were ordained by Phra Wanratana Mahathera Burean. This monastery was named "Wat Pakaew".

Afterwards, Phra Wanratana of Wat Pa Kaew suggested to King Naresuan the Great to build a Chedi (pagoda). He decided to construct a large Chedi in this monastery in 1592 AD. This monastery became known as Wat Yai Chaimongkhon.

== Wihan Phraphutthasaiyat ==
Wihan Phraphutthasaiyat (the name of the ordination hall) was constructed in the reign of King Naresuan the Great for religious adoration and royal meditation. The Buddha Image was restored in 2508 B.E (1965), according to a publication of the Wat.

== Wat Yai Chai Mongkhon ==
The ubosot (buddhist temple) and vihara (monastery) have their rear sections extended through the gallery. The satellite stupas of varied structural forms and contemporary with the main stupa are lined up outside the gallery.

== Phra Chedi Chaimongkhon ==
King Naresuan the Great had an order to construct this Chedi as the memorial for his victory over Maha Uparacha (crown prince) of Burma.

== The Ubosatha Hall ==
The Uposatha Hall is the main hall for Sangha (Brotherhood of monks). It is used to hold important religious ceremonies. It was first built by King U-thong who proclaimed this as the royal monastery of the forest order.

== Gallery ==
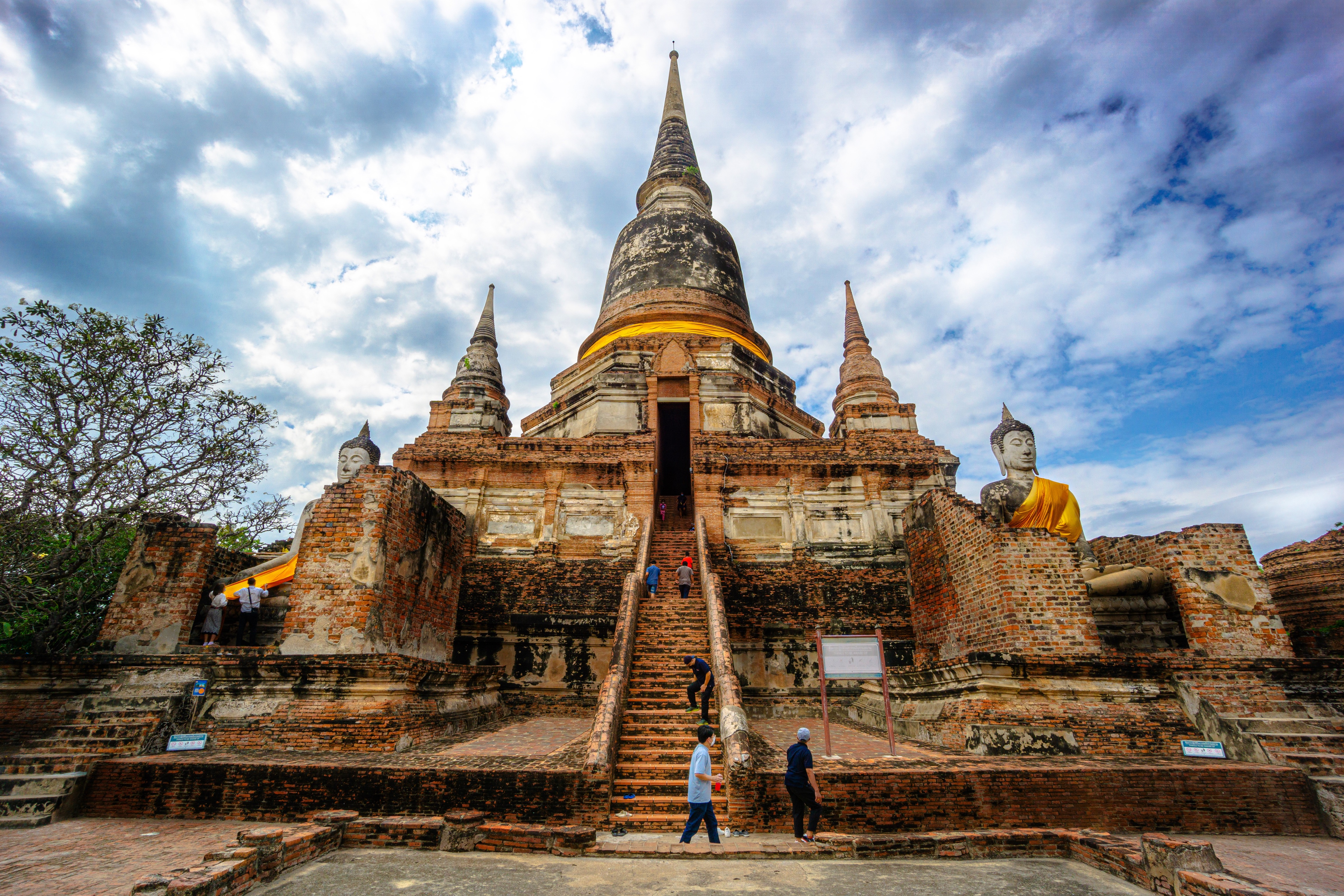

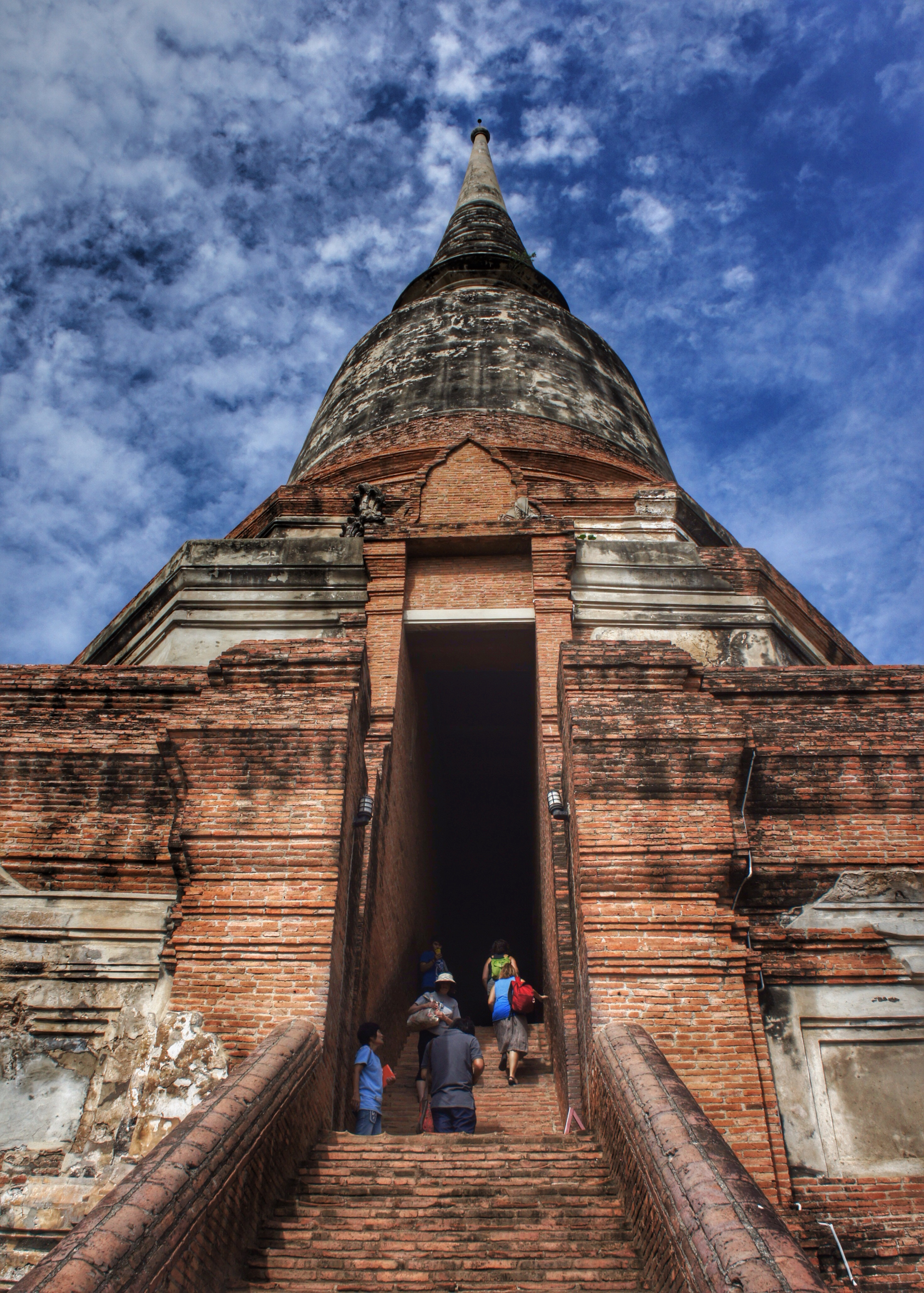

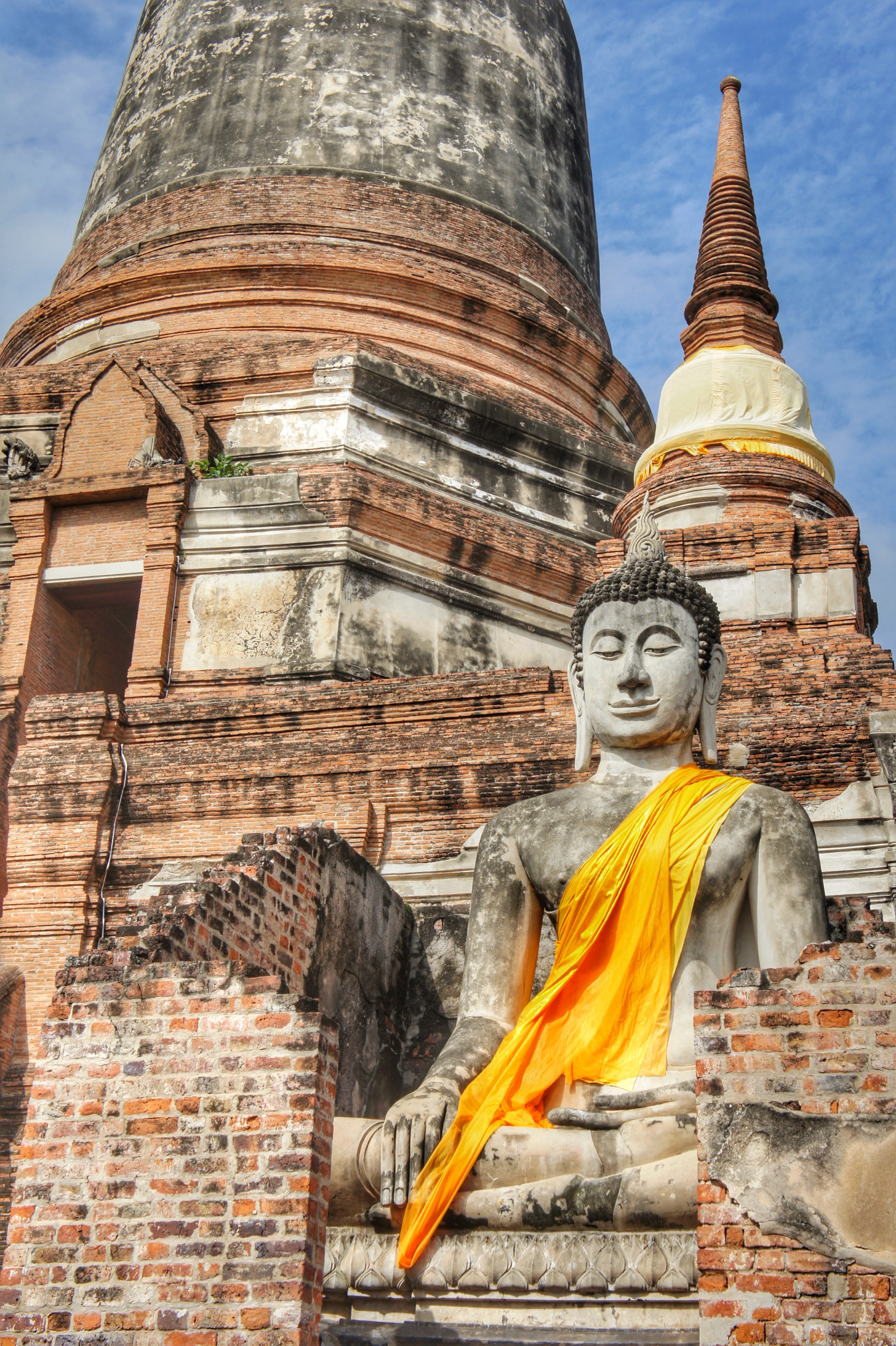

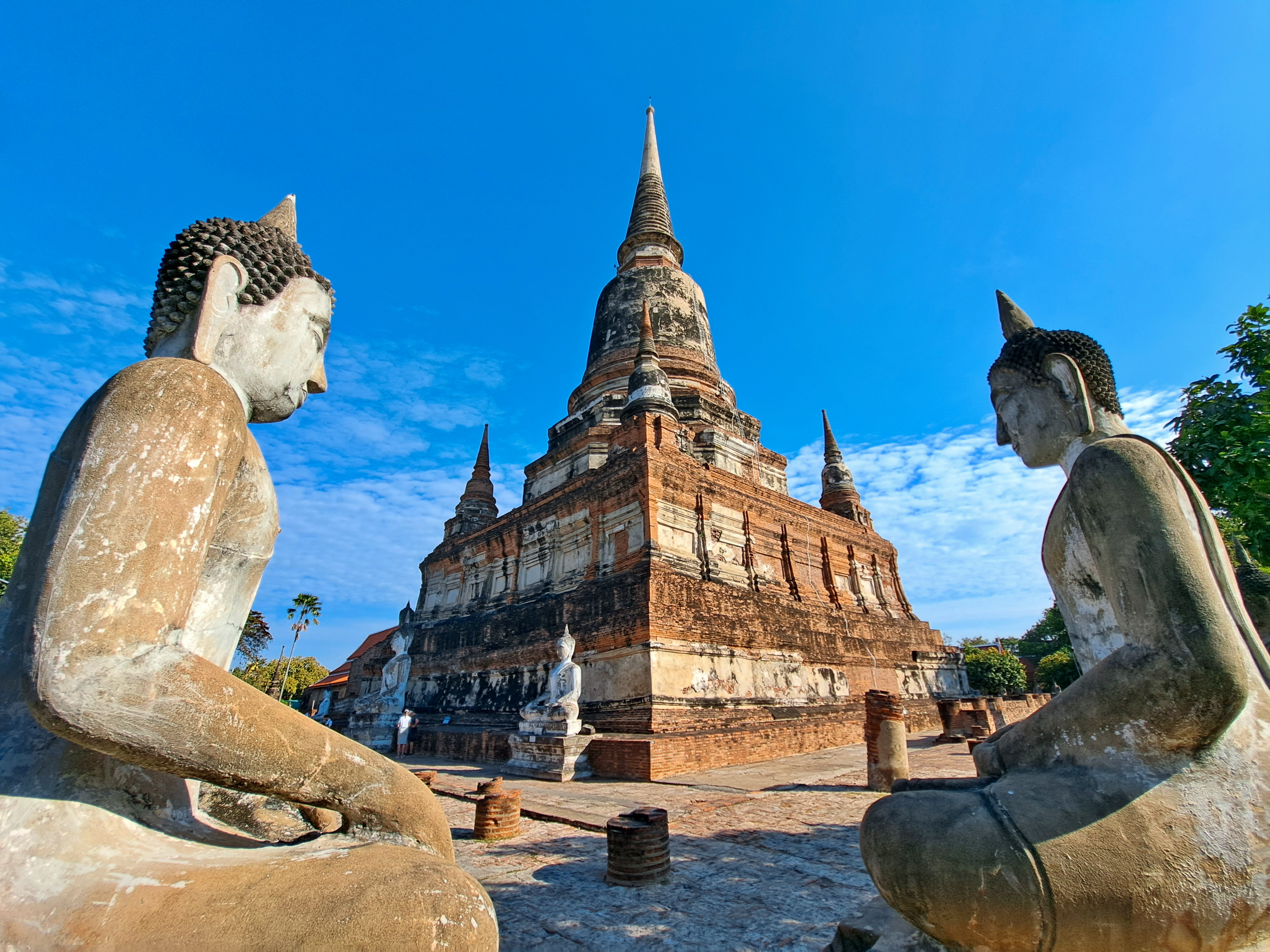

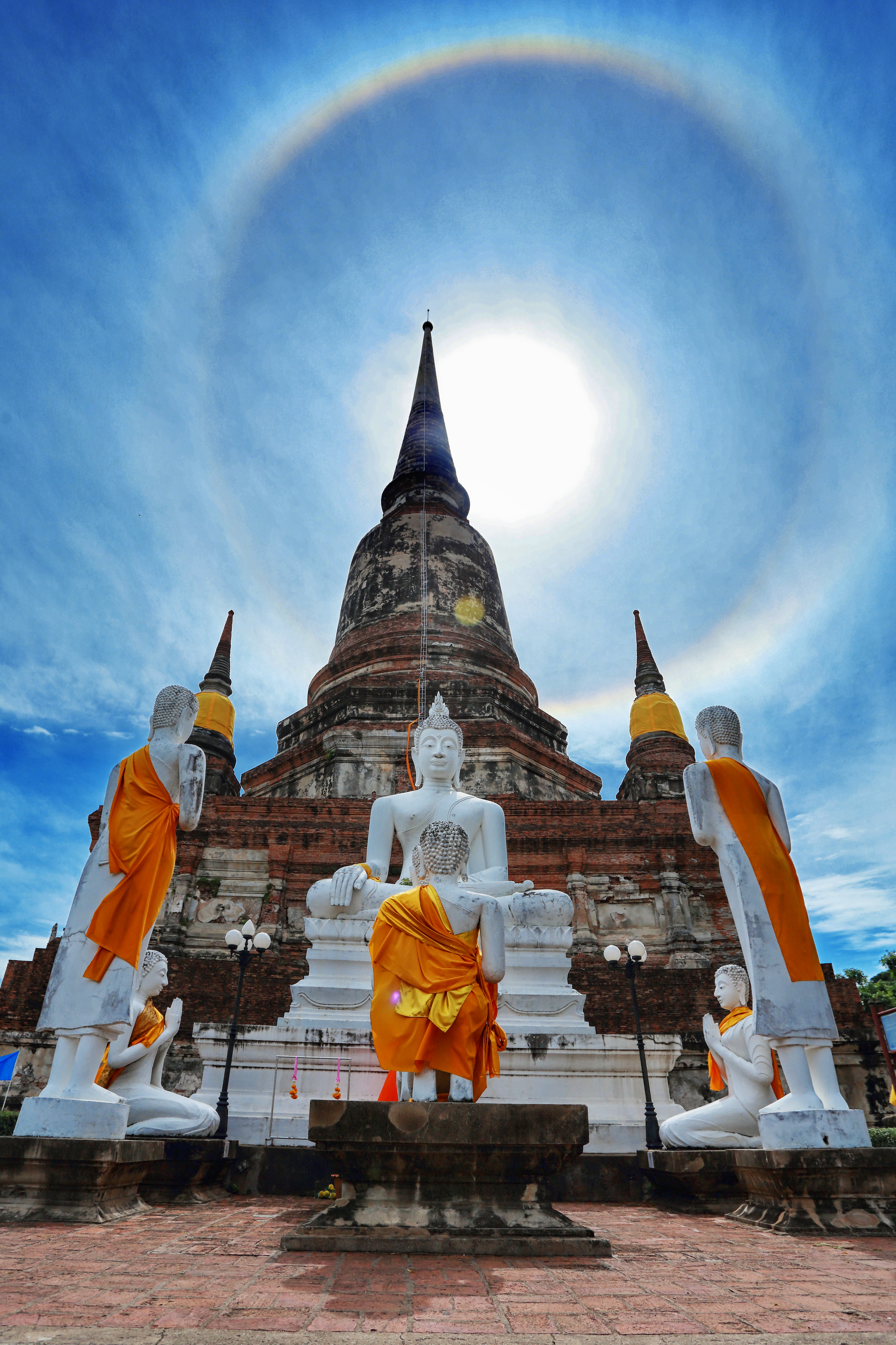

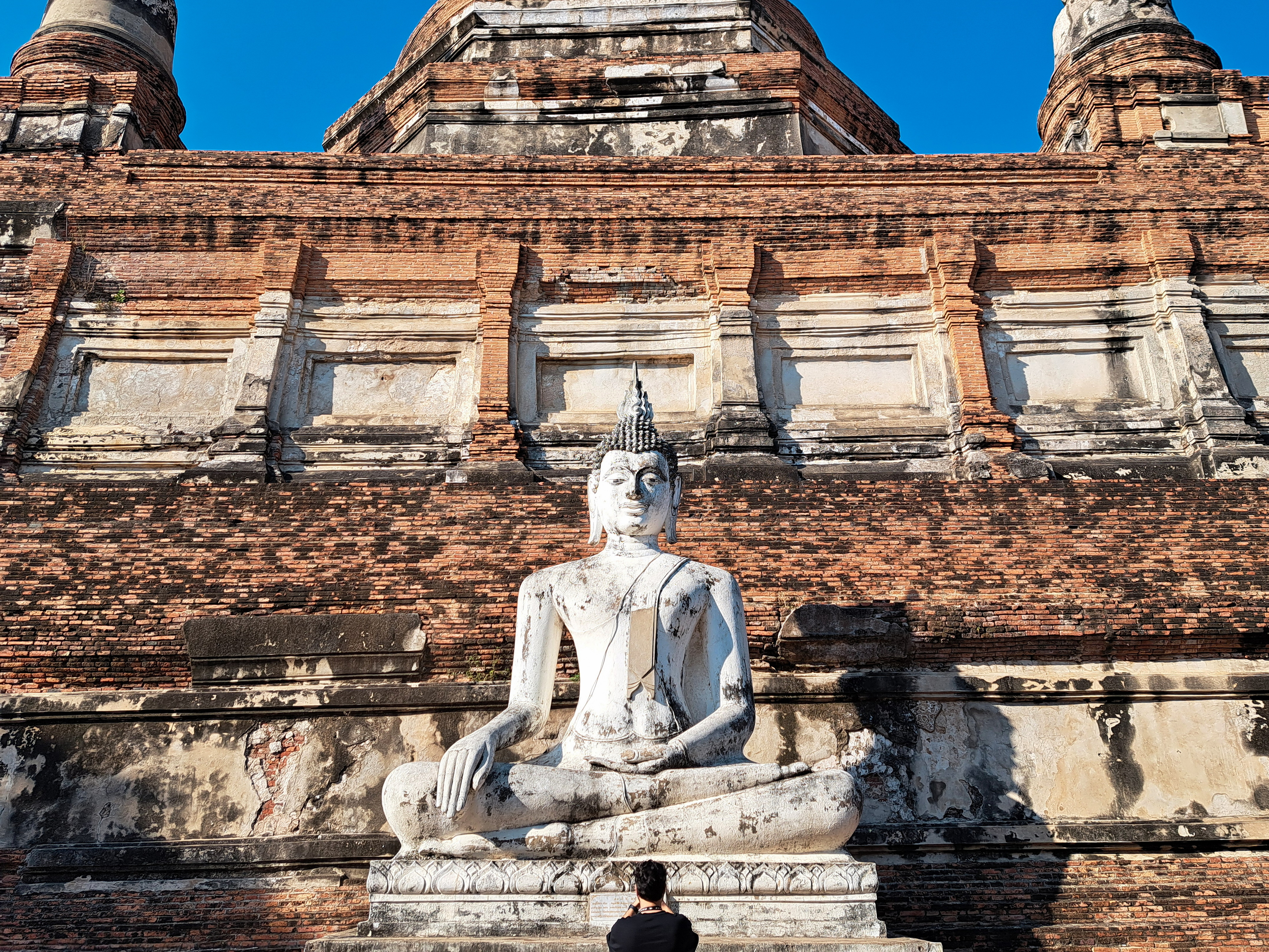
