= Wat Phra Ram =

Buddhist temple in Ayutthaya province, Thailand

- วัดพระราม
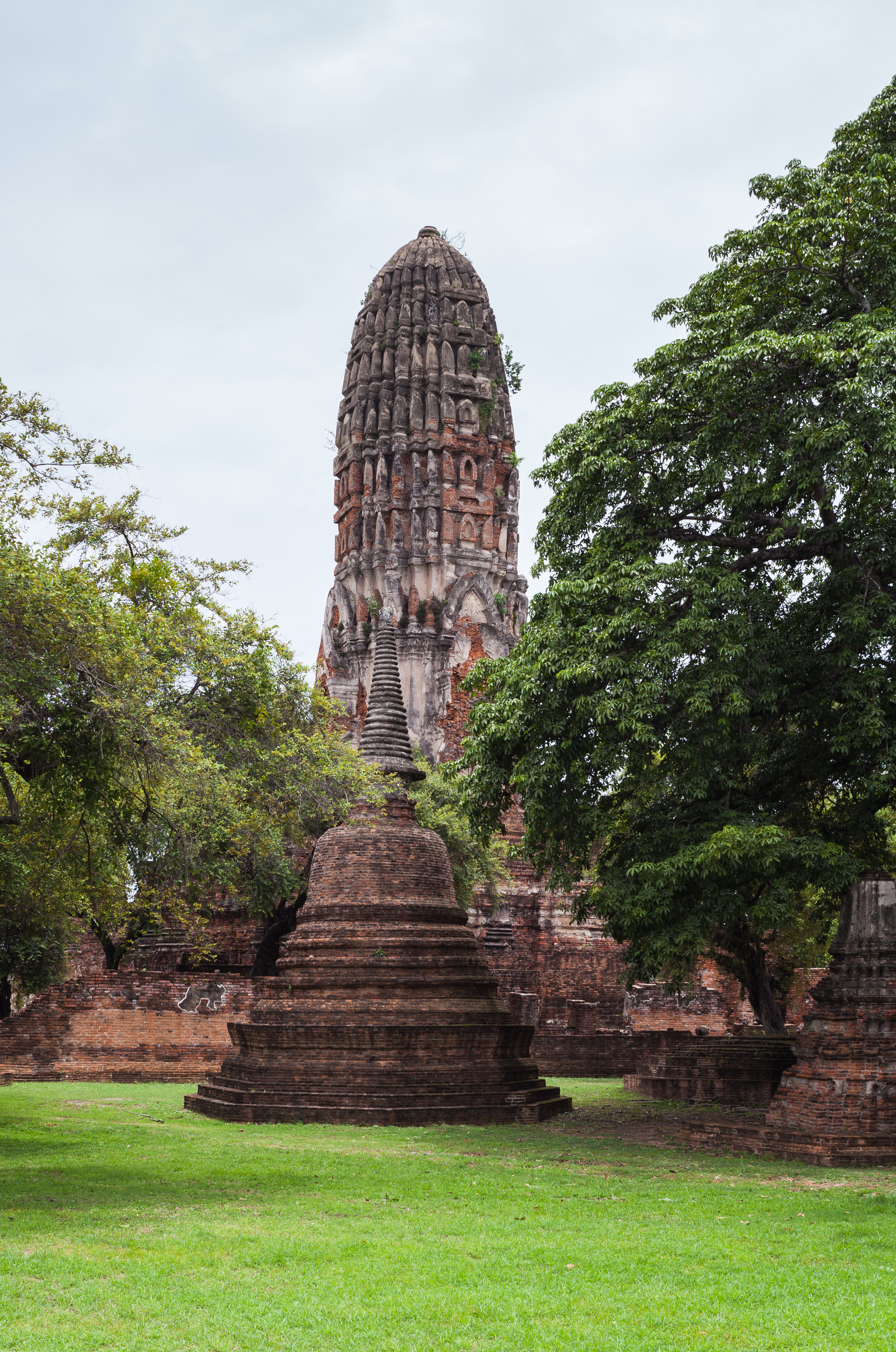

Religion
- Affiliation: Buddhism

Location
- Location: Pratu Chai, Phra Nakhon Si Ayutthaya District, Phra Nakhon Si Ayutthaya
- Country: Thailand
- Interactive map of Wat Phra Ram
- Coordinates: 14°21′15″N 100°33′42″E

Architecture
- Founder: Unknown

Wat Phra Ram (Thai: วัดพระราม), is a Buddhist temple in Phra Nakhon Si Ayutthaya district, Phra Nakhon Si Ayutthaya province. Wat Phra Ram is located in the heart of the old Ayutthaya, surrounded by the river, east of Wat Phra Si Sanphet and southeast of Wang Luang. Wat Phra Ram, like the main temples of Ayutthaya, faces east.

== Gallery ==
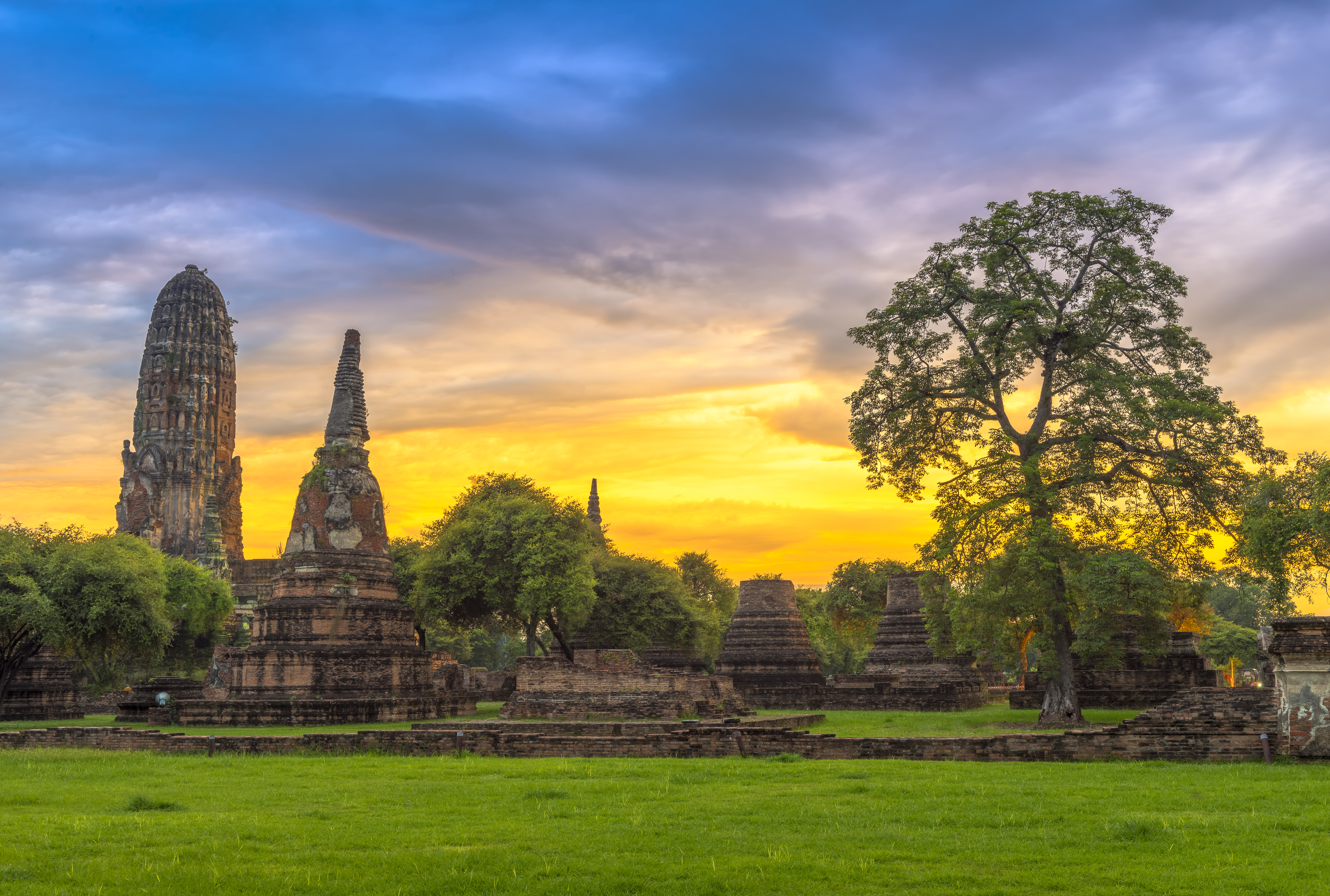

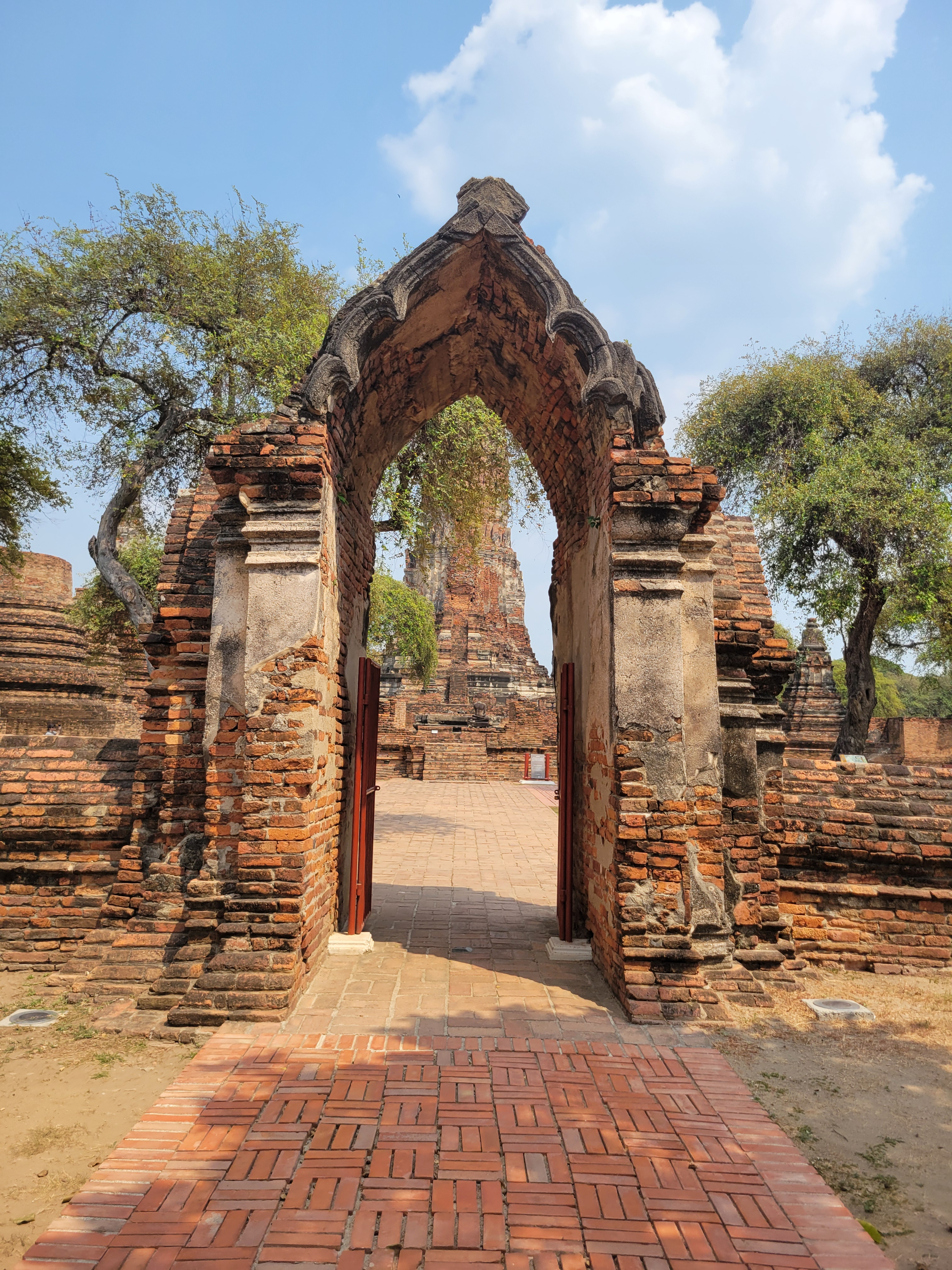
