= Twp =

TWP, twp or Twp. may refer to:

== Arts and media ==
- Truth & Wisdom Press, a Chinese publisher
- The Washington Post, an American newspaper
- The Women's Philharmonic, an American orchestra

== Finance ==
- Thomas Weisel Partners, an American investment bank

== Government and politics ==
- The Wikileaks Party, Australia
- Township (United States), a type of administrative area (abbreviated Twp.)
- Traditionalist Worker Party, United States
- True Whig Party, Liberia

== Language ==
- twp, in Welsh English
- Ere language, spoken on Manus, Papua New Guinea (ISO 639:twp)

== See also ==
- DWP (disambiguation)
- Toop, a surname and boat
- Township (disambiguation)
- Tup (disambiguation)
- Tupe (disambiguation)
