= DWP =

DWP may refer to:

== Arts and entertainment ==
- The Devil Wears Prada (film), a 2006 American comedy drama
- Djakarta Warehouse Project, an Indonesian festival of electronic dance music since 2008

== Businesses and organisations ==
=== Government and politics ===
- Democratic Workers Party, United States (1971–1987)
- Department for Work and Pensions, United Kingdom (formed 2001)
- Los Angeles Department of Water and Power, United States (formed 1902)

=== Other bodies ===
- Design Worldwide Partnership, pan-Asian architects (formed 1994)
- Diving With a Purpose, a maritime archaeology non-profit (formed 2005)
- Duluth, Winnipeg and Pacific Railway, Canada

== See also ==
- Doop (disambiguation)
- Dup (disambiguation)
- Dupe (disambiguation)
- DWB (disambiguation)
- Twp (disambiguation)
