= Money Weekly =

Weekly business magazine in China

- Categories: Business magazine
- Frequency: Weekly
- First issue: 18 March 2001
- Based in: Shanghai
- Language: Chinese
- Website: www.moneyweekly.com.cn
- ISSN: 1009-9832
- OCLC: 191334655

Money Weekly
- Traditional Chinese: 理財週刊
- Simplified Chinese: 理财周刊
Transcriptions
Standard Mandarin
- Hanyu Pinyin: Lǐcái zhōukān

The Money Weekly (simplified Chinese: 理财周刊; traditional Chinese: 理財週刊; pinyin: Lǐcái zhōukān) is a Chinese investment and financial management magazine established on 18 March 2001 and headquartered in Shanghai. It is the first financial management magazine catering to investors in Mainland China.

Presented by Shanghai Johnson Group and Shanghai Century Publishing Group, Money Weekly is published every Monday in Shanghai and is distributed throughout China.

Money Weekly annually hosts financial management fairs in Shanghai and surrounding cities.
