= Tupper =

Tupper may refer to:

== People ==
- Anselm Tupper (1763–1808), Continental Army officer, pioneer to the Ohio Country, son of Benjamin Tupper
- Archelaus Tupper (died 1781), Vermont militia sergeant, whose death in a skirmish with a British military unit caused a scandal when it became known that Vermont was engaged in separate peace negotiations with the British
- Benjamin Tupper (1738–1792), Continental Army officer, and pioneer to the Ohio Country
- Charles Tupper (1821–1915), Prime Minister of Canada
- Charles Hibbert Tupper (1855–1927), Solicitor General and Minister of Justice of Canada, son of the Canadian prime minister
- Charles F. Tupper (1852–1929), American lawyer and politician
- Charles H. P. Tupper (1887–1950), Canadian politician, MLA for British Columbia
- Charles Tupper Jr. (born 1942), American politician
- Clarrie Tupper (1908-1985), Australian rugby league footballer
- Earl Tupper (1907–1983), American businessman, inventor of Tupperware
- Edward Tupper (1871 or 1872–1942), British Trade unionist
- Ferdinand Brock Tupper (1795–1874), British historian
- Frances Tupper (1826–1912), wife of Charles Tupper
- Henry Martin Tupper (1831–1893), American Baptist minister and founder of Shaw University
- Jeff Tupper, the creator of Tupper's self-referential formula
- Loretta Clemens Tupper (1906-1990), American singer, pianist, vaudevillian and radio actress
- Martin Farquhar Tupper (1810–1889), English poet and novelist
- Mike Tupper, American politician
- Reginald Tupper (1859–1945), British Royal Navy admiral
- Stanley R. Tupper (1921–2006), American politician and lawyer
- Tullius Cicero Tupper (1809–1866), American lawyer, newspaper publisher and Civil War major general of the Mississippi State Troops
- William Tupper (born 1933), Canadian politician
- William Johnston Tupper (1862–1947), Lieutenant-Governor of Manitoba, son of the Canadian prime minister

== Fictional characters ==
- Alf Tupper, comic strip character
- Amos Tupper, sheriff on the American television series Murder, She Wrote
- George Tupper, in P.G. Wodehouse's stories
- Hannah Tupper, in The Witch of Blackbird Pond
- Martin Tupper, from the American television series Dream On
- Tommy Tupper, from the British television series The Benny Hill Show
- Tupper the Bulldog, mascot of Bryant University
- Tupper, a meth dealer from the 2011 film The Green Hornet

== Geography ==
- Tupper Lake (New York)
- Tupper Creek, West Virginia

== Other uses ==
- CCGS Tupper
- Tupper baronets, a title in the Baronetage of the United Kingdom
- Sir Charles Tupper Secondary School, Vancouver, British Columbia, Canada

== See also ==
- Tup (disambiguation)
