= Design Worldwide Partnership =

Global architectural and design firm

dwp | Design Worldwide Partnership

Practice information
- Founded: 1994 (dwp)
- No. of employees: 250
- Location: Bahrain; Bangkok; Dubai; Ho Chi Minh City; Hong Kong; Manila

Significant works and honors
- Awards: 2017; CID Awards, Sustainable Interior Design Initiative; Luxury Residence Global Award; BCI Asia Award, Interior Design; AIA Award Newcastle, Educational Architecture, Winner; 2016; Living Building Challenge; AIA Award NT, Commercial Architecture; AIA Award WA, Public Architecture; Victorian Healthcare Assn Award

Website
- http://dwp.com/

dwp | Design Worldwide Partnership provides architectural and interior design services across Asia, Europe and the Middle East. Founded in Thailand in 1994, DWP grew to a consortium that was launched in 2001, as a partnership of design businesses on across Asia and The Middle East with offices in such countries as Vietnam, Malaysia, UAE, Bahrain, Thailand, Singapore, Hong Kong. The business focus is architecture and interior design for global brands and fortune 500 businesses.

== Sirocco restaurant ==
DWP designed the Sirocco restaurant in the State Tower in Bangkok, featured in the movie The Hangover Part II. Other projects include facilities for multinationals clients including Citigroup, InterContinental Hotels Group and Microsoft.

== See also ==
- Architecture of Thailand
- Architecture of Vietnam
