= DWB =

DWB and variations may refer to:

== Publications ==
- Deutsches Wörterbuch, a comprehensive German dictionary (since 1854)
- Dictionary of Welsh Biography, about people from Wales (since 1959)
- Doctor Who Bulletin, a British sci-fi and fantasy fanzine (1983–1989)
- DW B, a literary magazine in Flanders (since 1900)

== Other uses ==
- Deutscher Werkbund, a German Arts and Crafts Movement, founded as an association in 1907, with sister associations in Austria (Österreichischer Werkbund founded in 1912), Switzerland (Schweizerischer Werkbund since 1913), and in Italy, a predecessor to the Bauhaus
- members of the present-day Deutscher Werkbund who are entitled to use "dwb" as post nominals
- Driving while black, a sardonic description of racial profiling of African-American motor vehicle drivers
- Warm summer subtype (Dwb), a category of humid continental climate
- Doctors Without Borders, also known as Médecins Sans Frontières, international humanitarian organisation
- "DWB", a ninth-season episode of the American police procedural and legal drama Law & Order

== See also ==
- Doob (disambiguation)
- DWP (disambiguation)
