= Shanghai Century Publishing Group =

Chinese publishing company

Shanghai Century Publishing (Group) Co., Ltd
- Native name: 上海世纪出版（集团）有限公司
- Industry: Publishing
- Founded: February 24, 1999
- Headquarters: Shanghai, China
- Website: www.shcpg.com.cn

Shanghai Century Publishing (Group) Co., Ltd (Chinese: 上海世纪出版（集团）有限公司) is a state-owned publishing company based in Shanghai, China.

== History ==
It was created on February 24, 1999.

== Shanghai People's Publishing House ==
It is the parent company of Shanghai People's Publishing House, Wenjing (Beijing Century Wenjing Culture and Media Co. Ltd.), Shanghai Educational Publishing House, Shanghai Translation Publishing House, Truth & Wisdom Press, etc.
