= Truth & Wisdom Press =

Chinese educational publisher

- Type: Subsidiary
- Industry: Publishing
- Genre: Education
- Founded: 2005
- Headquarters: Shanghai, China
- Key people: Weiwen Fan (范 蔚文), President & Editor-in-Chief; Yanxiang Xin (忻 雁翔), Vice Editor-in-Chief
- Website: www.hibooks.cn

Truth & Wisdom Press (TWP or "格致出版社" in Chinese) is an educational publisher based in Shanghai, China. It is an imprint of Shanghai Century Publishing Group, which is also the parent company of Shanghai People's Publishing House and Shanghai Translation Publishing House. Their publications cover the studies of business, economics, and humanities.

== Publications ==
One of TWP's publications is the 30 Years of China's Reform Studies Series ("中國改革30年研究叢書" in Chinese), which aims to be a resource for people interested in learning about China's economy. In October 2008, Cengage Learning bought the English language copyright of this series.

The English language edition of the 30 Years of China's Reform Studies Series
