= Tup =

Tup or TUP may refer to:

== Arts and entertainment ==
- Tup (album), 1993, by Loppybogymi
- Tup, a Star Wars character

== Technology ==
- Telephone User Part, a protocol
- Tup, the head of a steam hammer or pile driver

== Other uses ==
- Ṭup (cuneiform), a sign in cuneiform writing
- Technological University of the Philippines
- Tupelo Regional Airport, Mississippi, United States
- Tup, an uncastrated male sheep
  - Tupping, copulation in sheep, also the sheep mating season

== See also ==
- Dup (disambiguation)
- Top (disambiguation)
- Tupe (disambiguation)
- Twp (disambiguation)
