= Indented corners (Thai architecture) =

Thai architectural feature

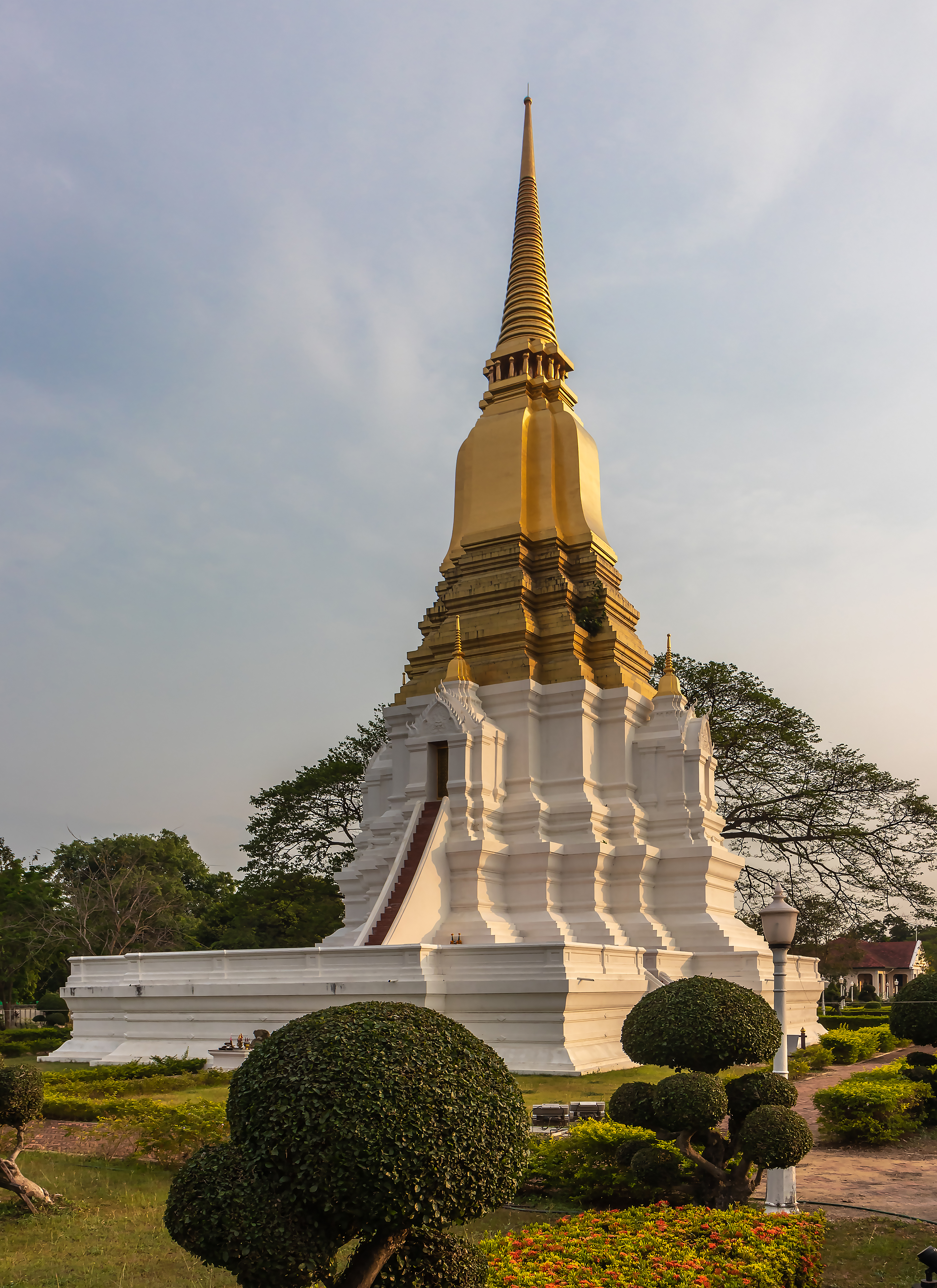
Chedi Si Suriyothai in Ayutthaya, an example of the twelve indented corners form

Indented corners, known in Thai as yo mum (ย่อมุม, pronounced [jɔ̂ː.mūm]), are a feature of traditional Thai architecture where the corners of a rectangular structure are broken up into multiple recessed corners. The most common form features three angles at each of the structure's four corners, and is referred to as twelve indented corners, or yo mum mai sip song (ย่อมุมไม้สิบสอง). The form is featured extensively in the religious architecture of the late Ayutthaya period, and can be found in stupas (chedi), building columns, and the tiered spires of the prasat architectural form.
