= Shanghai People's Publishing House =

Printing and publishing house based in China

Shanghai People's Publishing House 上海人民出版社
- Parent company: Shanghai Century Publishing Group
- Founded: March 1, 1951; 75 years ago
- Country of origin: China
- Headquarters location: Century Publishing Park, Lane 159, King Road, Minhang District
- Publication types: Publishing
- Official website: www.spph.com.cn

The Shanghai People's Publishing House (Chinese: 上海人民出版社) abbreviated as SPPH, is a printing and publishing house based in Shanghai. It was established in 1972, replacing the Shanghai Publishing Bureau which was reinstated on January 1, 1978.

== History ==
The Shanghai People's Publishing House is the predecessor of the East China People's Publishing House, established in March 1951 by the Editorial and Publication Departments of the Xinhua Bookstore East China General Branch and the Publicity Department of the Chinese Communist Party of the East China Bureau, originally located at No. 1 Xinxiang Road.

In July 1951, the East China People's Publishing House relocated to No. 54 Shaoxing Road. The East China Newspaper Society merged with the East China People's Publishing House in August 1951, leading to the establishment of a fine arts editorial section. The East China People's Publishing House relocated and established the art editorial department as the independent East China People's Fine Arts Publishing House (now known as the Shanghai People's Fine Arts Publishing House) in August 1952.

In January 1955, the East China Region was dissolved, and the East China People's Publishing House was renamed Shanghai People's Publishing House.

In April 2001, the Publishing House was moved to No. 193, Fujian Road, Shanghai Book City. In September 2021, the Press relocated to Century Publishing Park, Lane 159, King Road, Minhang District.

== See also ==
- People's Publishing House
