= Toop =

Notable people with the surname Toop include:

- David Toop (born 1949), English musician and academic
- Ernest Toop (1895–1976), New Zealand politician and businessman
- Mike Toop, American football coach, retired in 2021
- Richard Toop (1945–2017), English-Australian musicologist

== See also ==
- "Toop Toop", 2006 song by French duo Cassius
- Toop (boat), type of boat in the East-Indies
