= Architecture of Thailand =

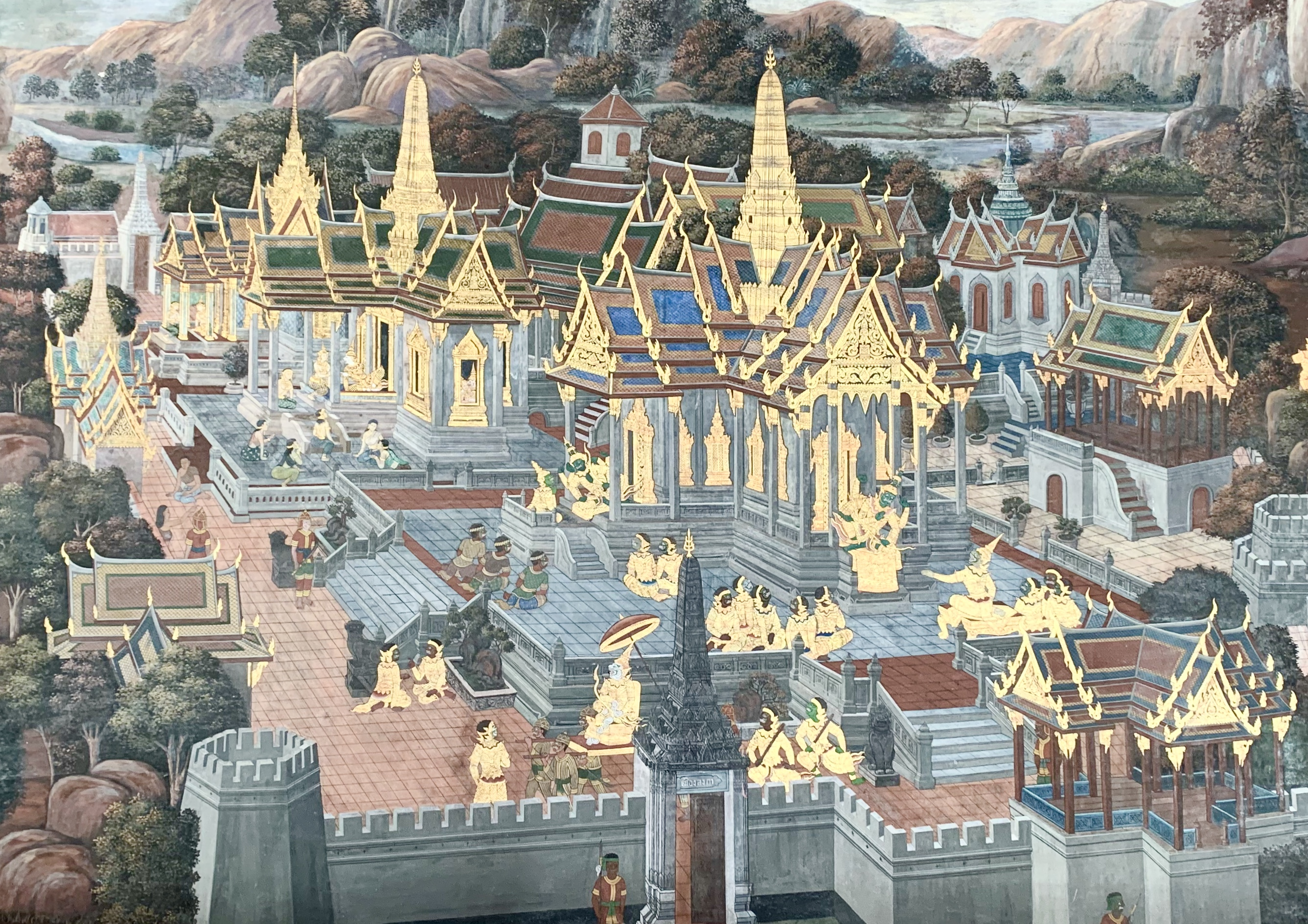
Murals in Wat Phra Kaew depicting a palace complex built in Thai architecture

The architecture of Thailand (Thai: สถาปัตยกรรมไทย) is a major part of Thailand's cultural legacy and reflects both the challenges of living in Thailand's sometimes extreme climate as well as, historically, the importance of architecture to the Thai people's sense of community and religious beliefs. Influenced by the architectural traditions of many of Thailand's cultures, it has also developed significant regional variation within its vernacular and religious buildings. Although Siam urged to identify themselves as a modernized state, Western culture and influence was undesirable and inevitable. In an attempt to become distinguished, Thailand's ruling elite gravitated toward selective Modernization to avoid the undesired Western influence.

== History ==
=== Dvaravati era (7th–11th century CE) ===
The architecture of Dvaravati appears in the central region of Thailand. It used clay bricks and sometimes laterite. The construction of pagodas had a square base and an inverted-bell shape topped with a spire. The Lavo Kingdom existed in modern-day Thailand during this time period.

=== Angkor era (11th–13th century CE) ===
The Khmer Empire occupied the Lavo Kingdom during this time period. The architecture of this era adopted the style of the Khmer and can be seen in the Shrines of Ganesh. This style preferred to use brick, sandstone, and laterite. Originally brick and sandstone were used to build houses or castles and laterite for bases.

=== Sukhothai era (13th to 14th century CE) ===
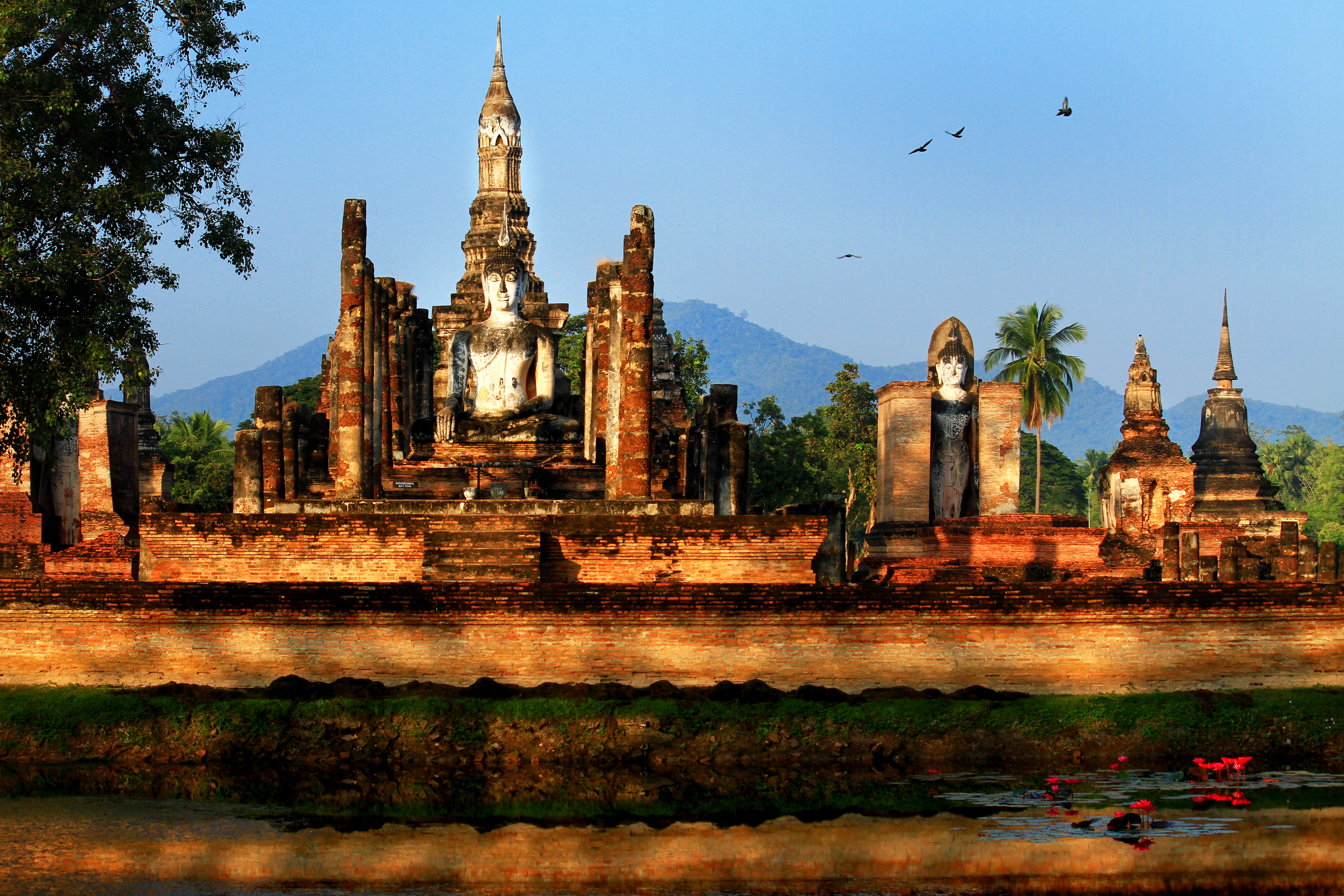
Phum Khao Bin Chedi of Wat Mahathat, Sukhothai Historical Park

The art of Sukhothai began in B.E 1780 when King Indraditya established the Sukhothai Kingdom. The identity of the architecture in Sukhothai is decorations in order to display the Buddhist faith by building the buildings in symbolic shapes.

=== Uthong Ayutthaya era (14th–15th century CE) ===
The architecture of Uthong integrated the art of Tawaravadee civilization such as the building style of Phra Prang in Wat Sri Rattana Mahathat, Lopburi.

=== Ayutthaya era (15th–18th century CE) ===
The identity of architecture in the Ayutthaya period is designed to display might and riches, so it has great size and appearance. The temples in Ayutthaya seldom built eaves stretching from the masterhead. The dominant feature of this style is sunlight shining into buildings. During the latter part of the Ayutthaya period, architecture was regarded as a peak achievement that responded to the requirements of people and expressed the gracefulness of Thainess. But the development of architecture had to stop because Ayutthaya was defeated in the Burmese–Siamese War of 1765–1767.

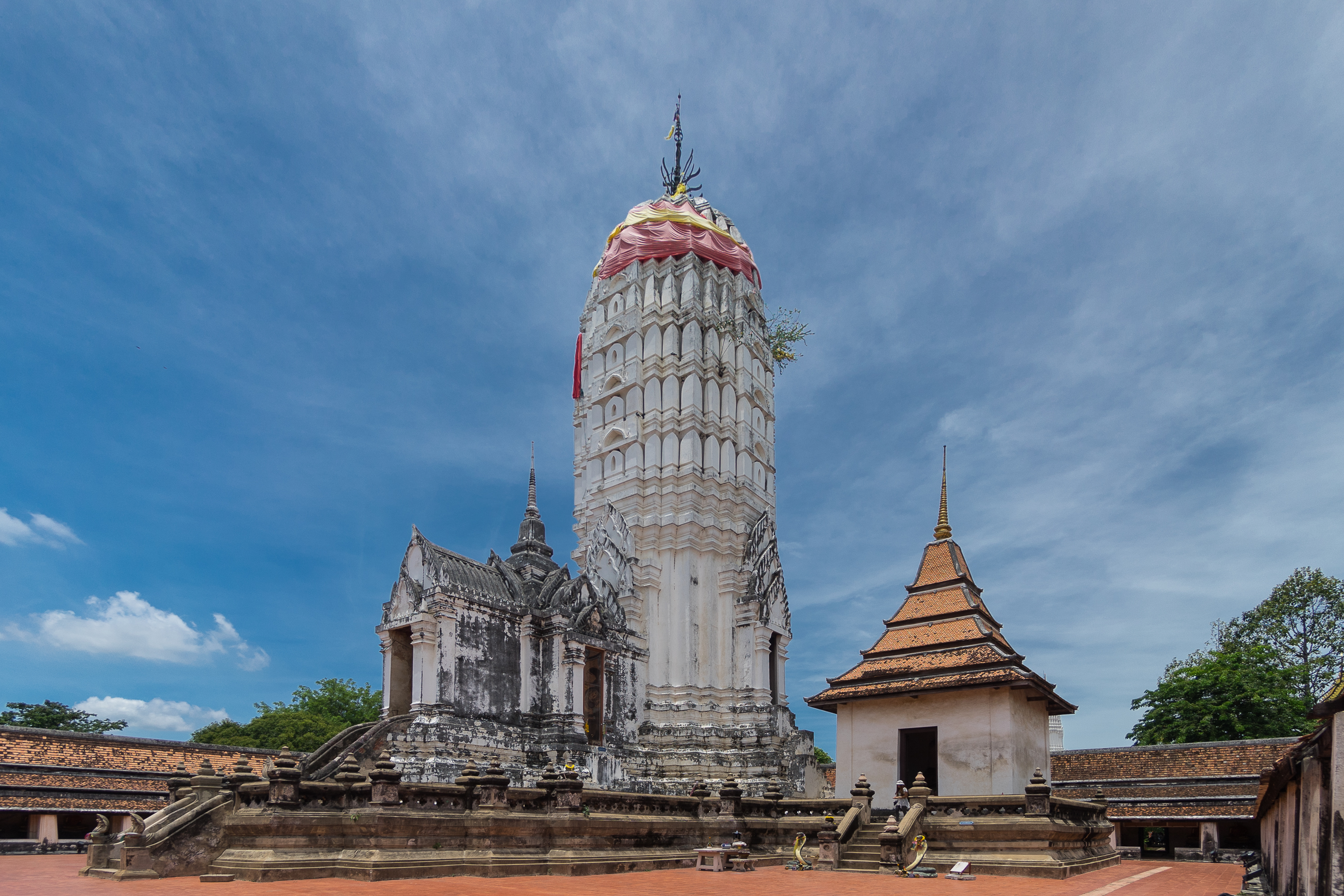
Wat Phutthaisawan, Ayutthaya

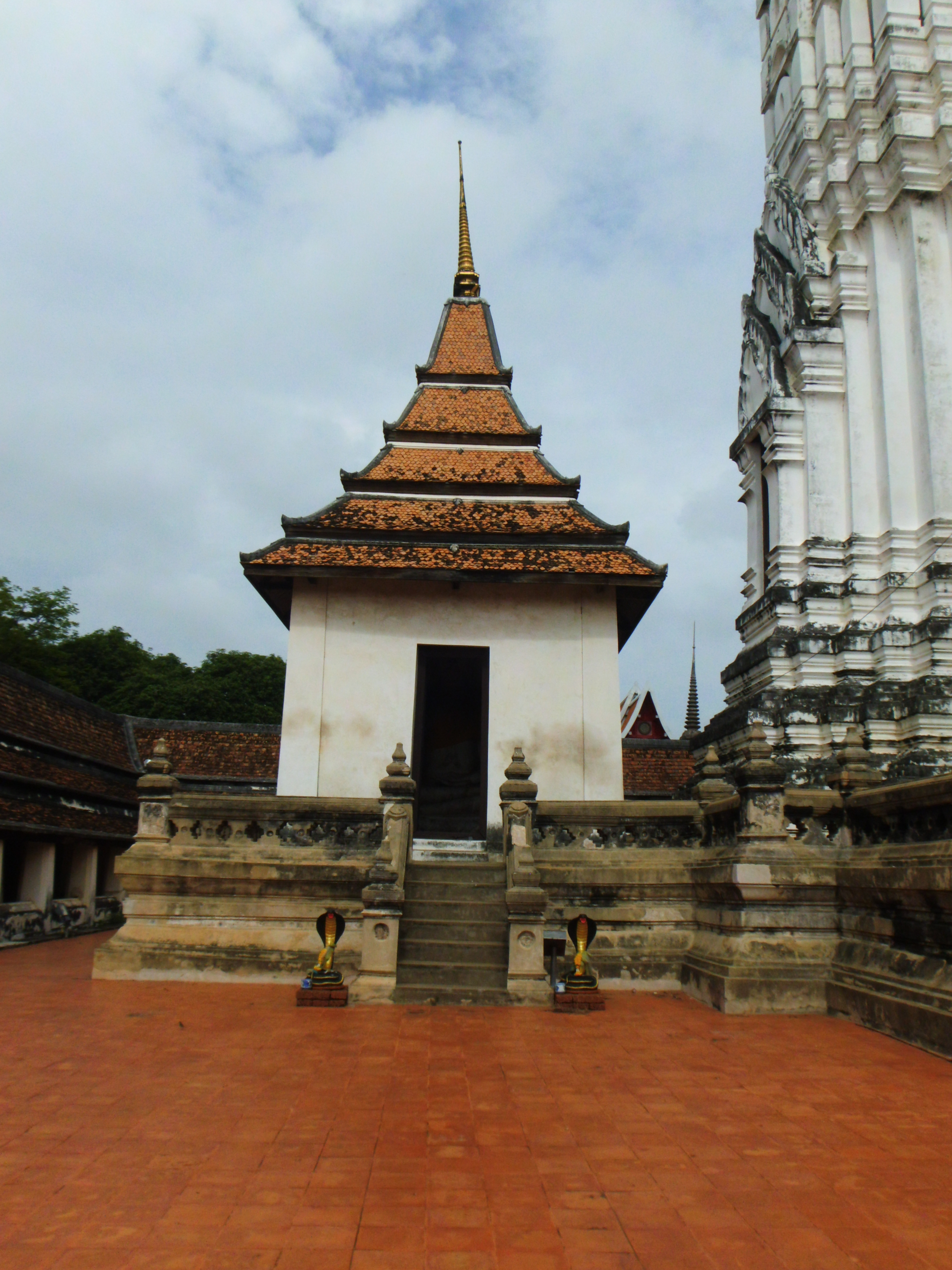
Wat Phutthaisawan

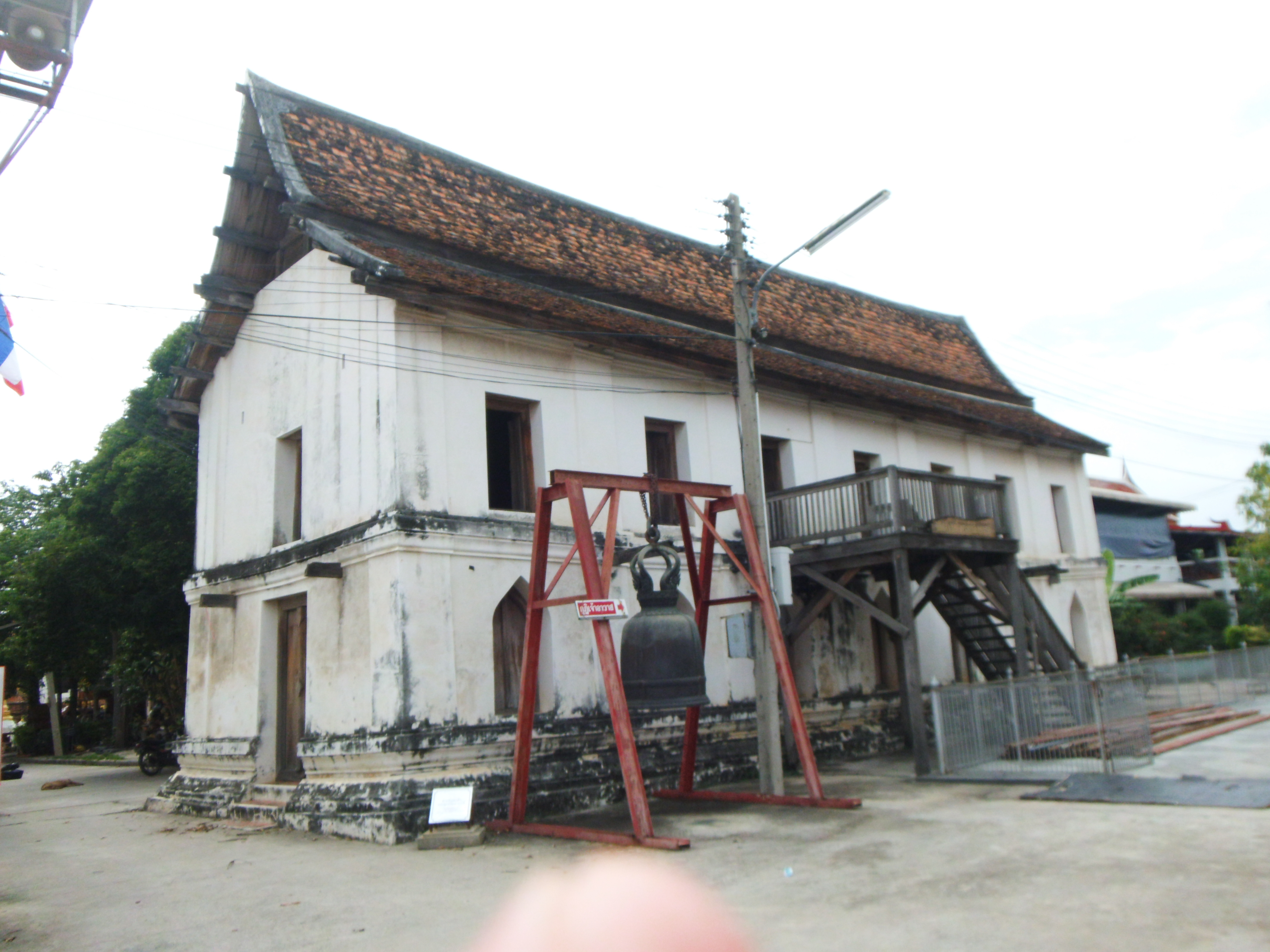
Wat Phutthaisawan

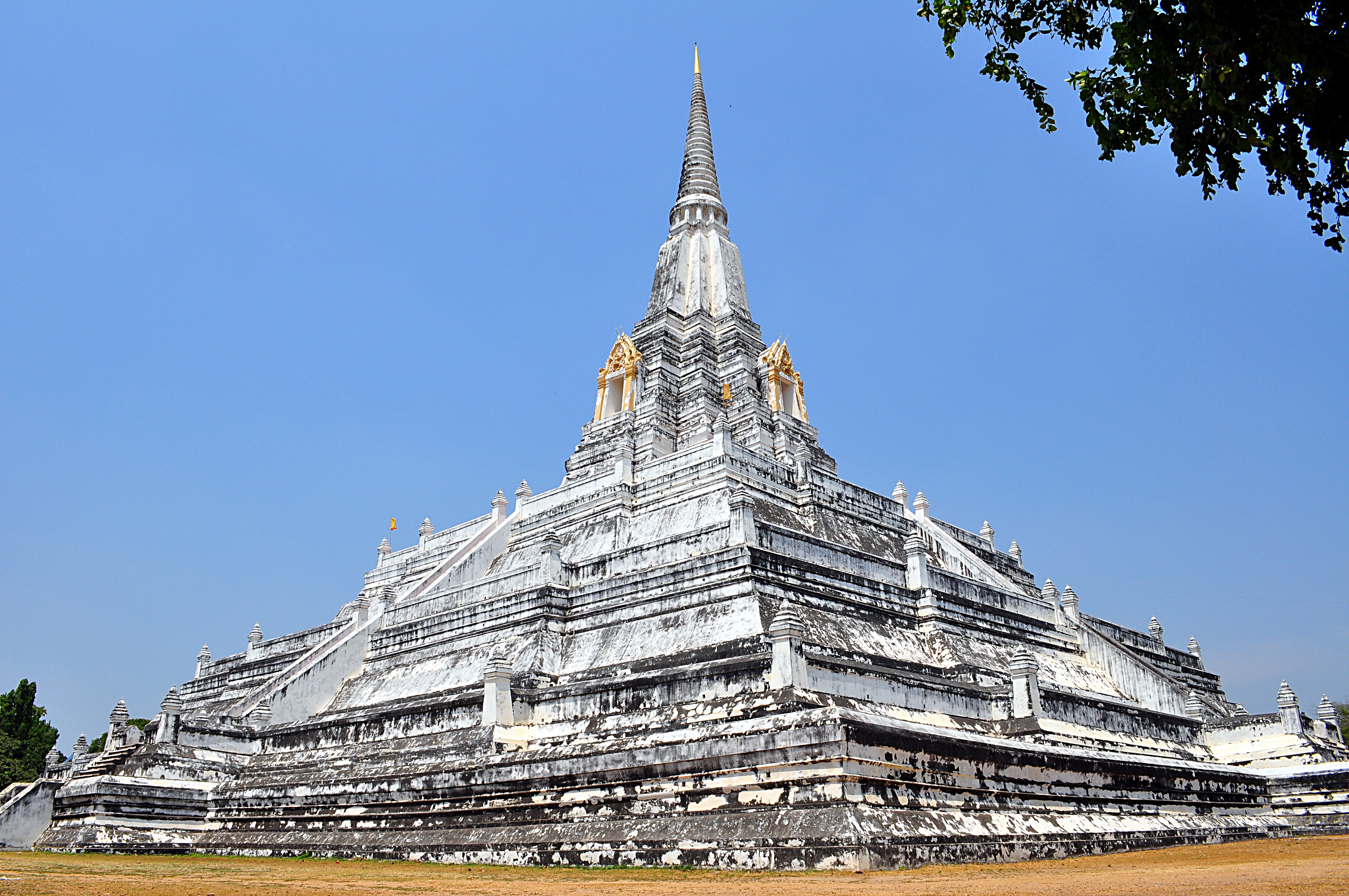
Wat Phu Khao Thong, Ayutthaya

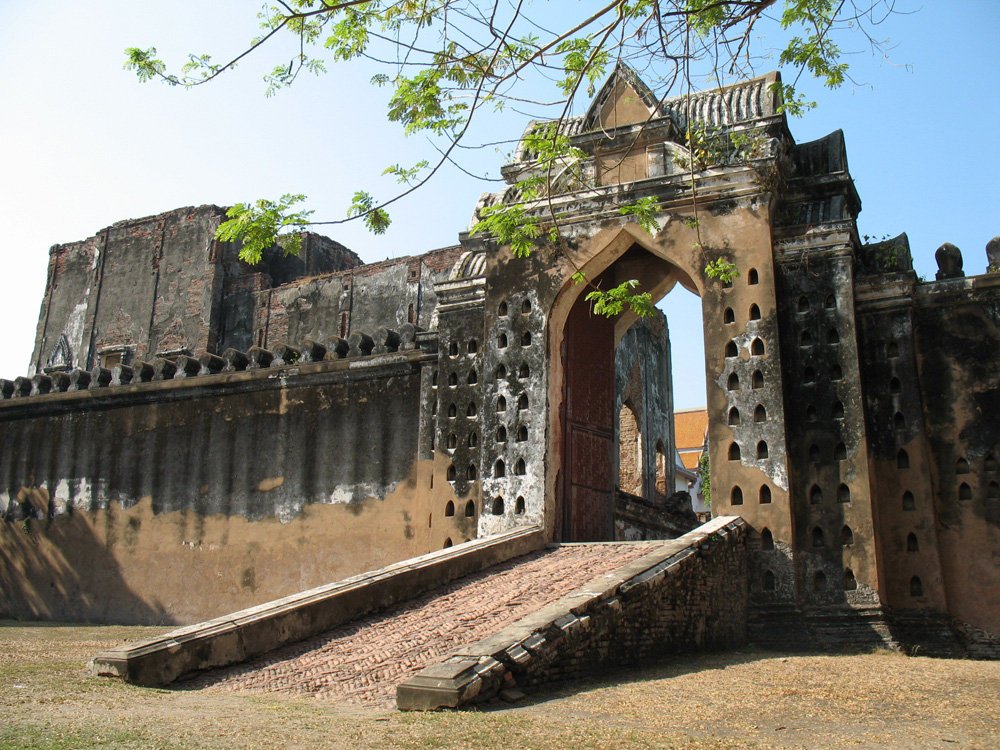
King Narai's Palace, Lopburi

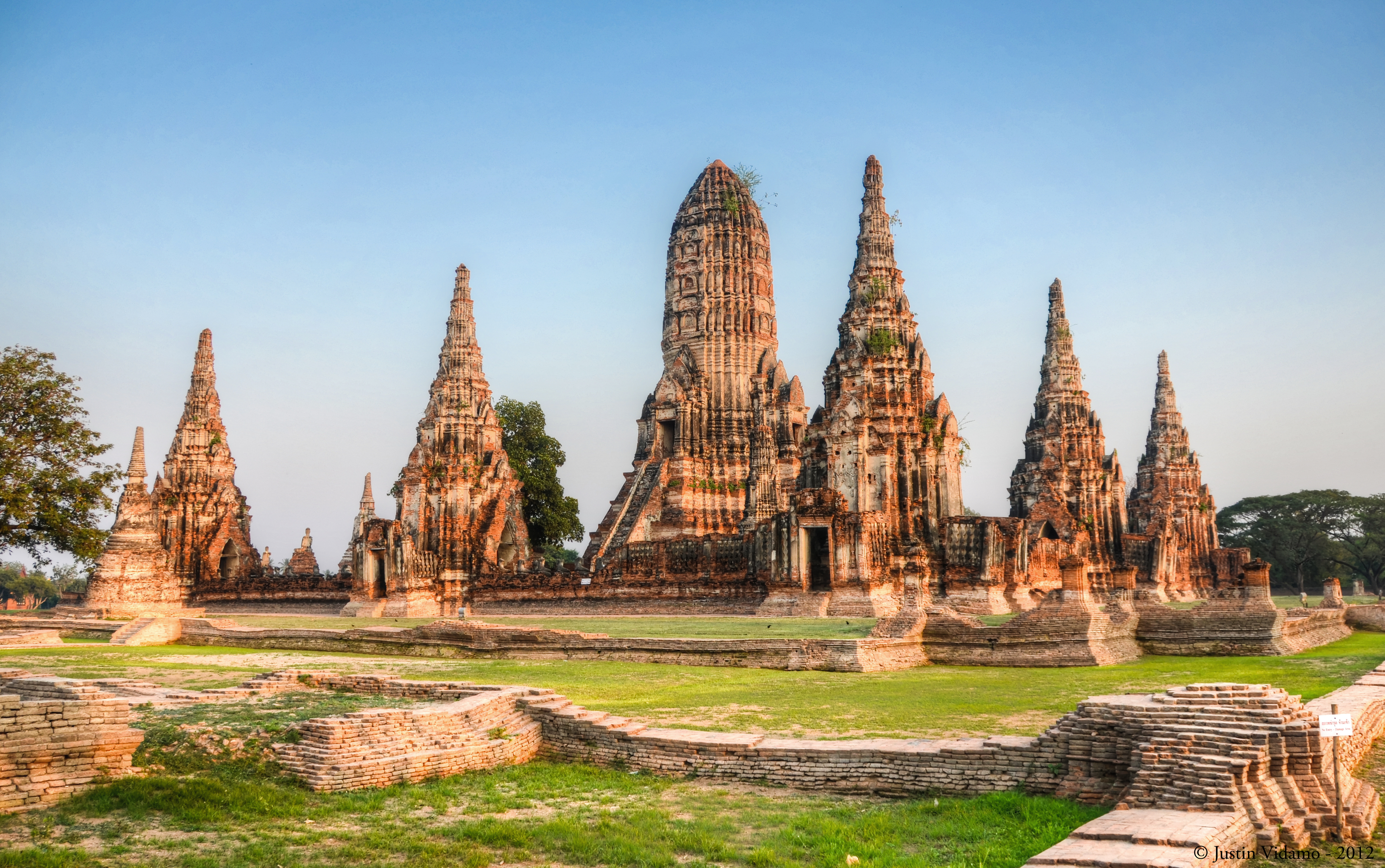
Wat Chaiwatthanaram, Ayutthaya

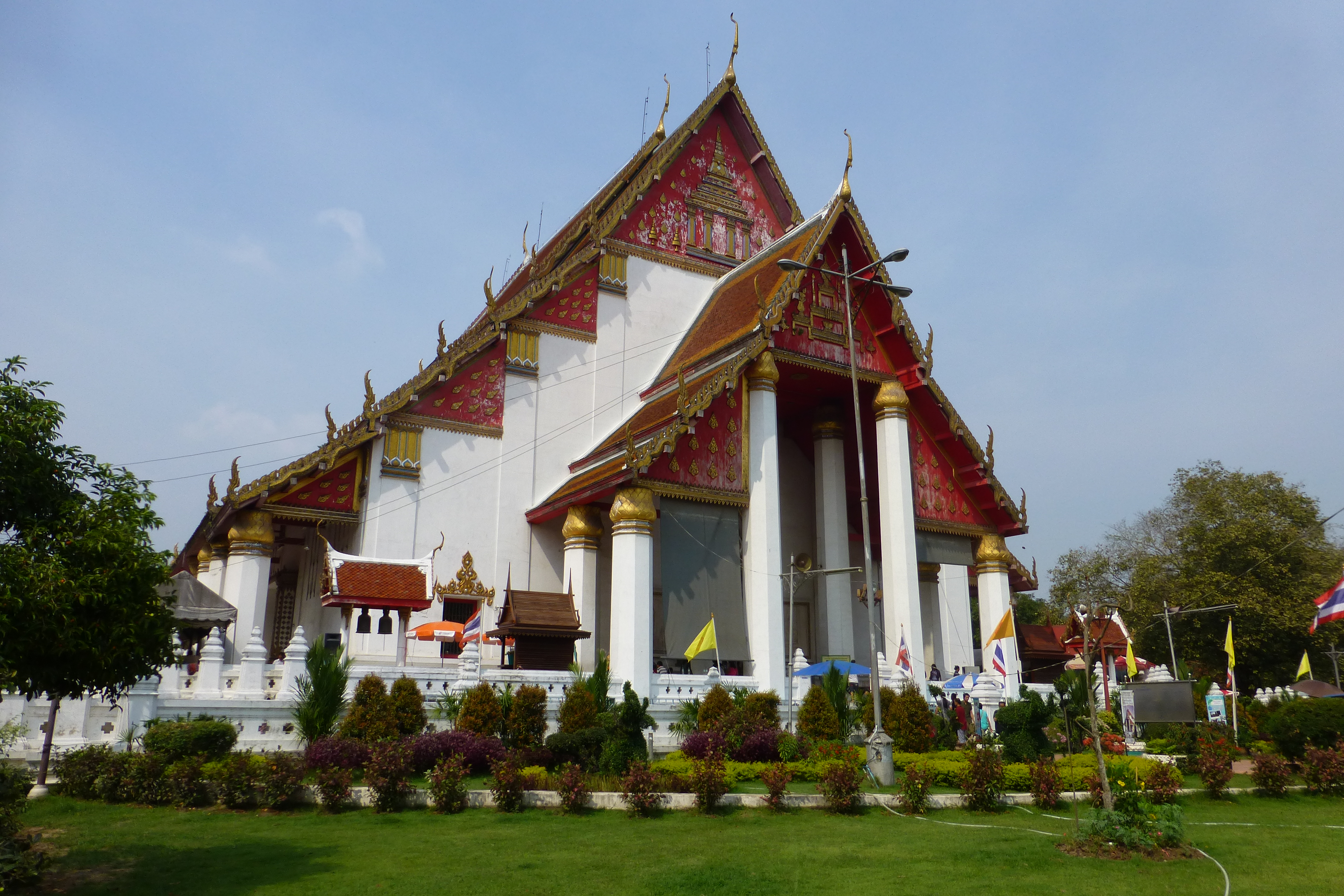
Wihan Phra Mongkhon Bopit, Ayutthaya

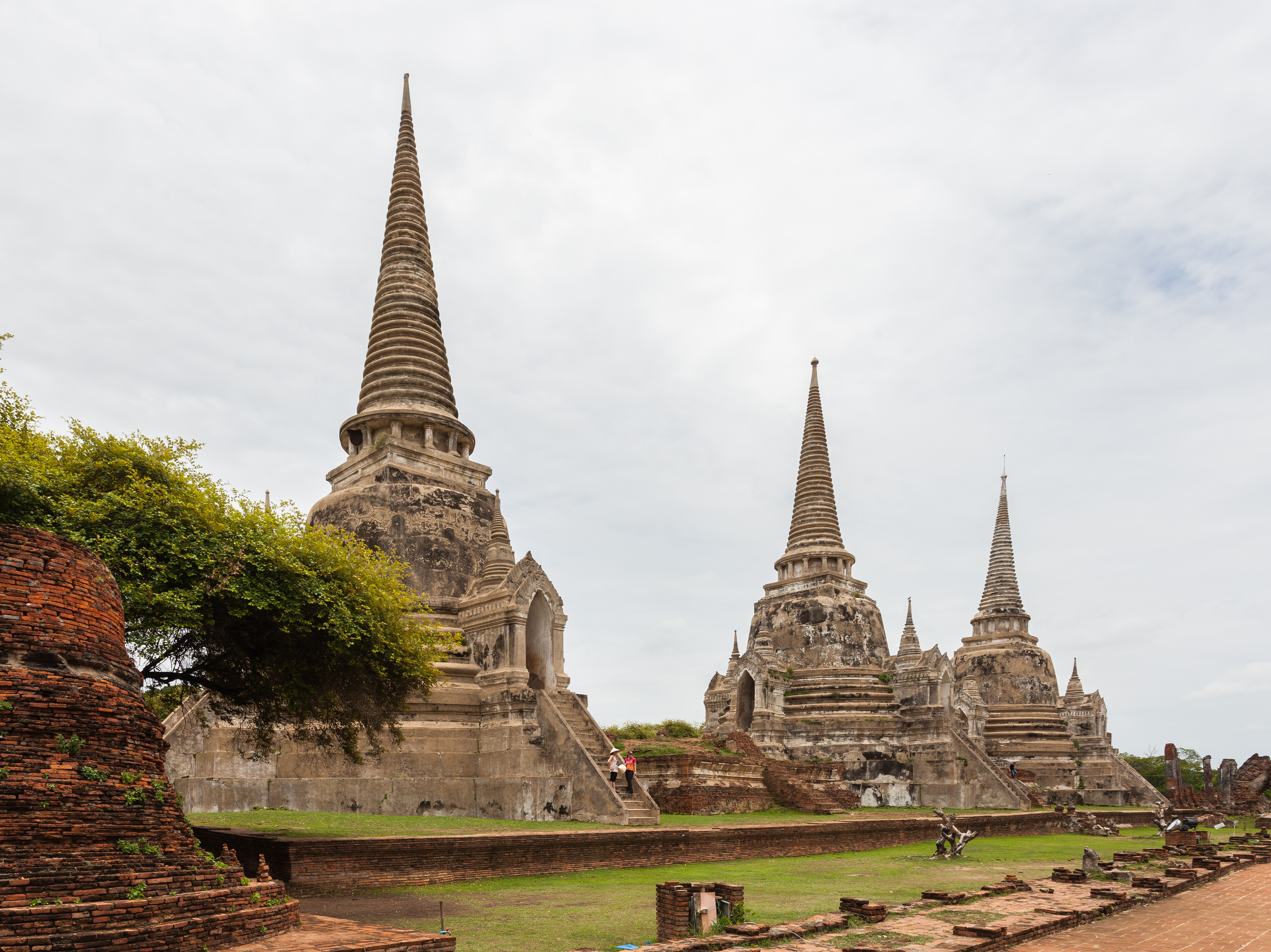
Wat Phra Si Sanphet, Ayutthaya

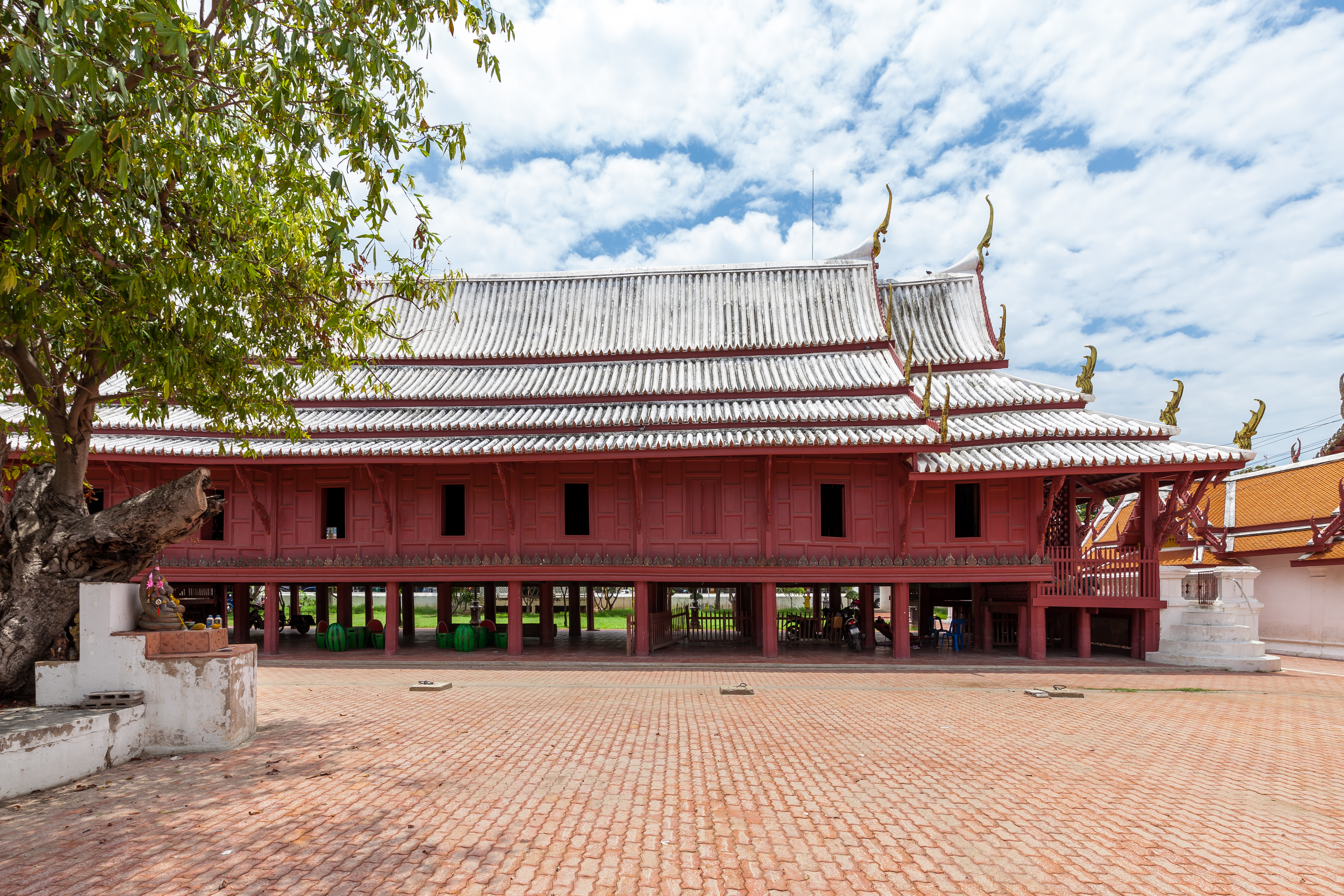
Wat Yai Suwannaram, Phetchaburi

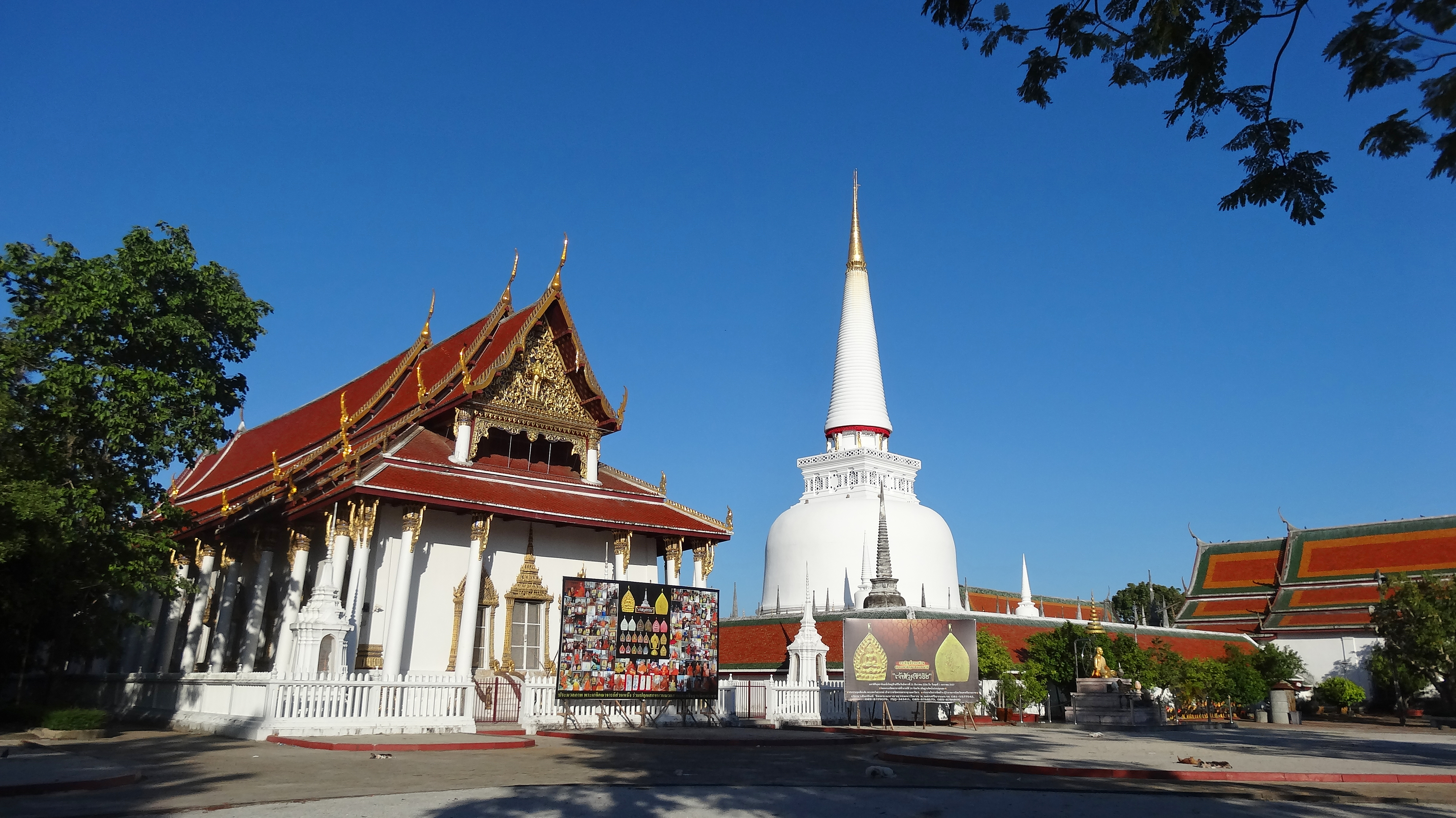
Wat Phra Mahathat, Nakhon Si Thammarat

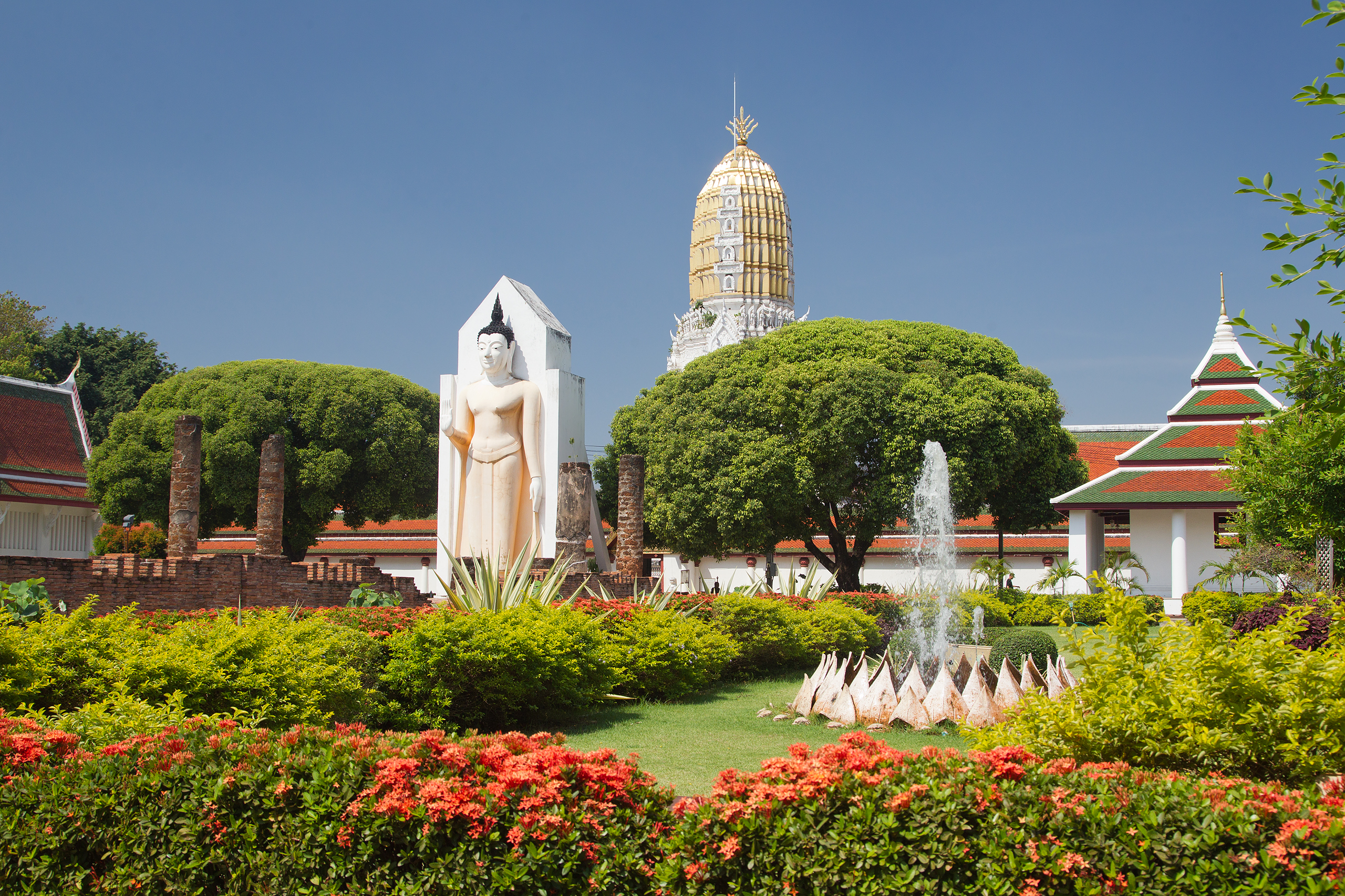
Wat Phra Si Rattana Mahathat, Phitsanulok

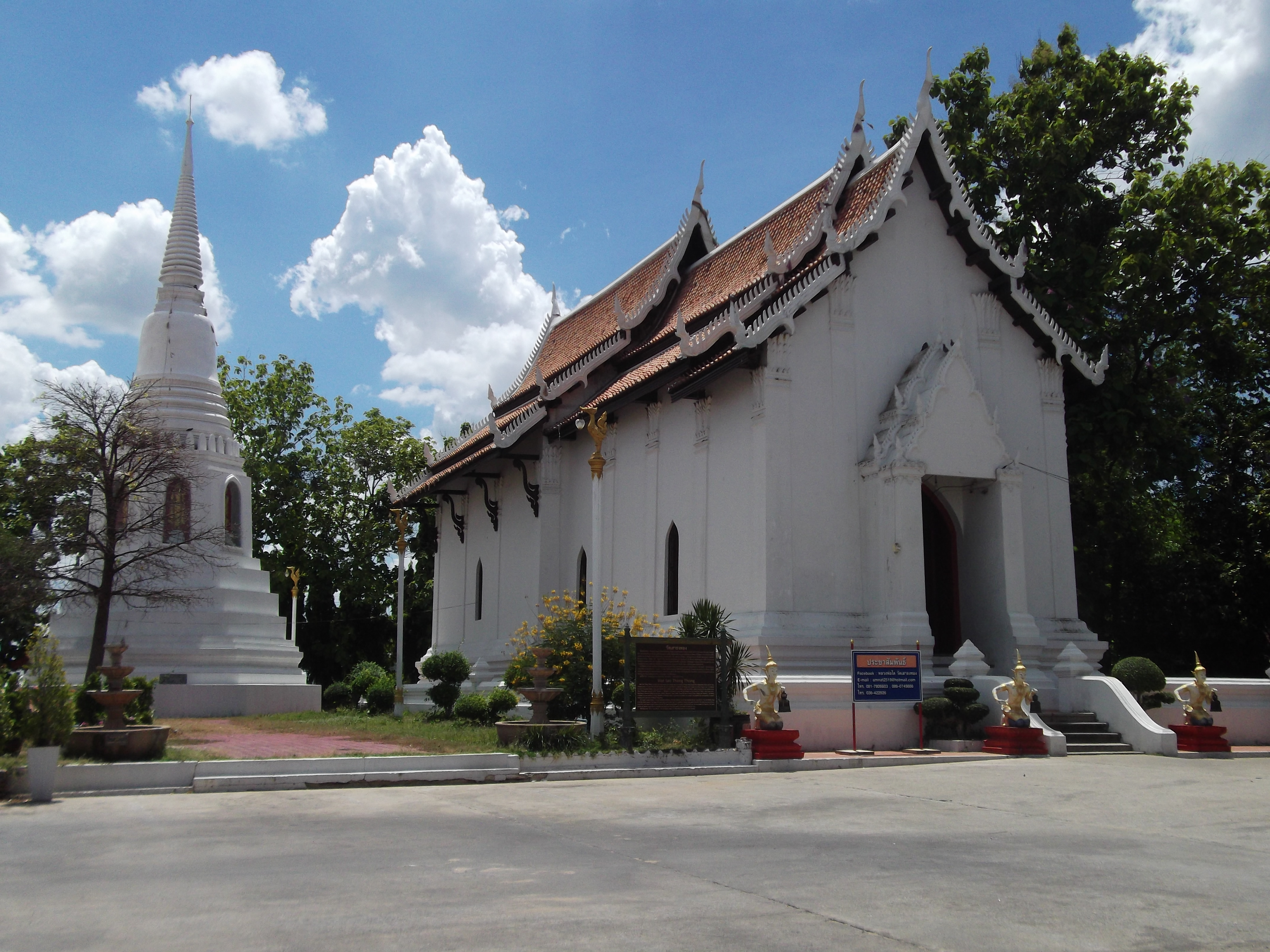
Wat Sao Sao Thong, Phitsanulok

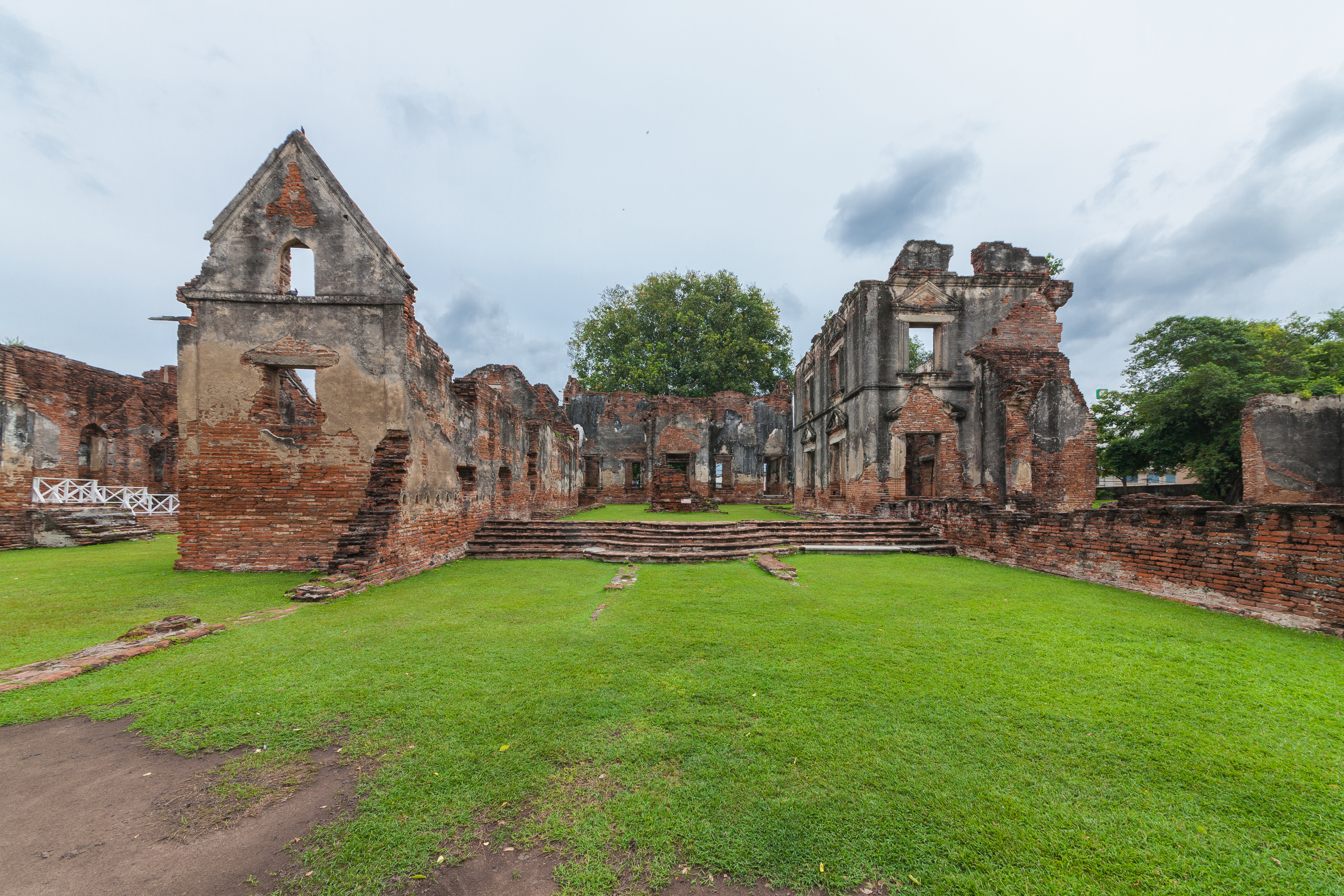
Ban Chao Wichayen, Lopburi

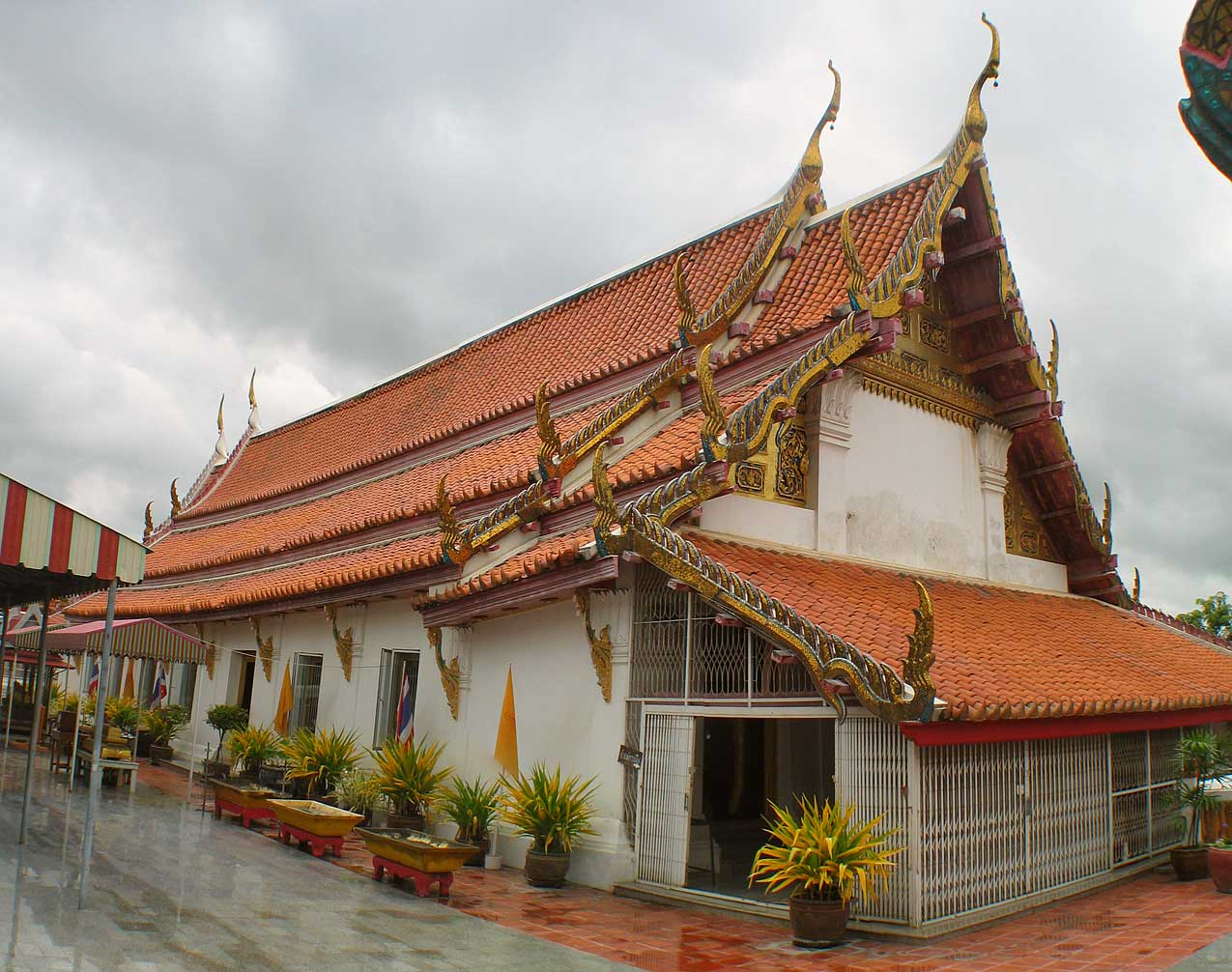
Wat Phra Mok Worawihan, Ang Thong

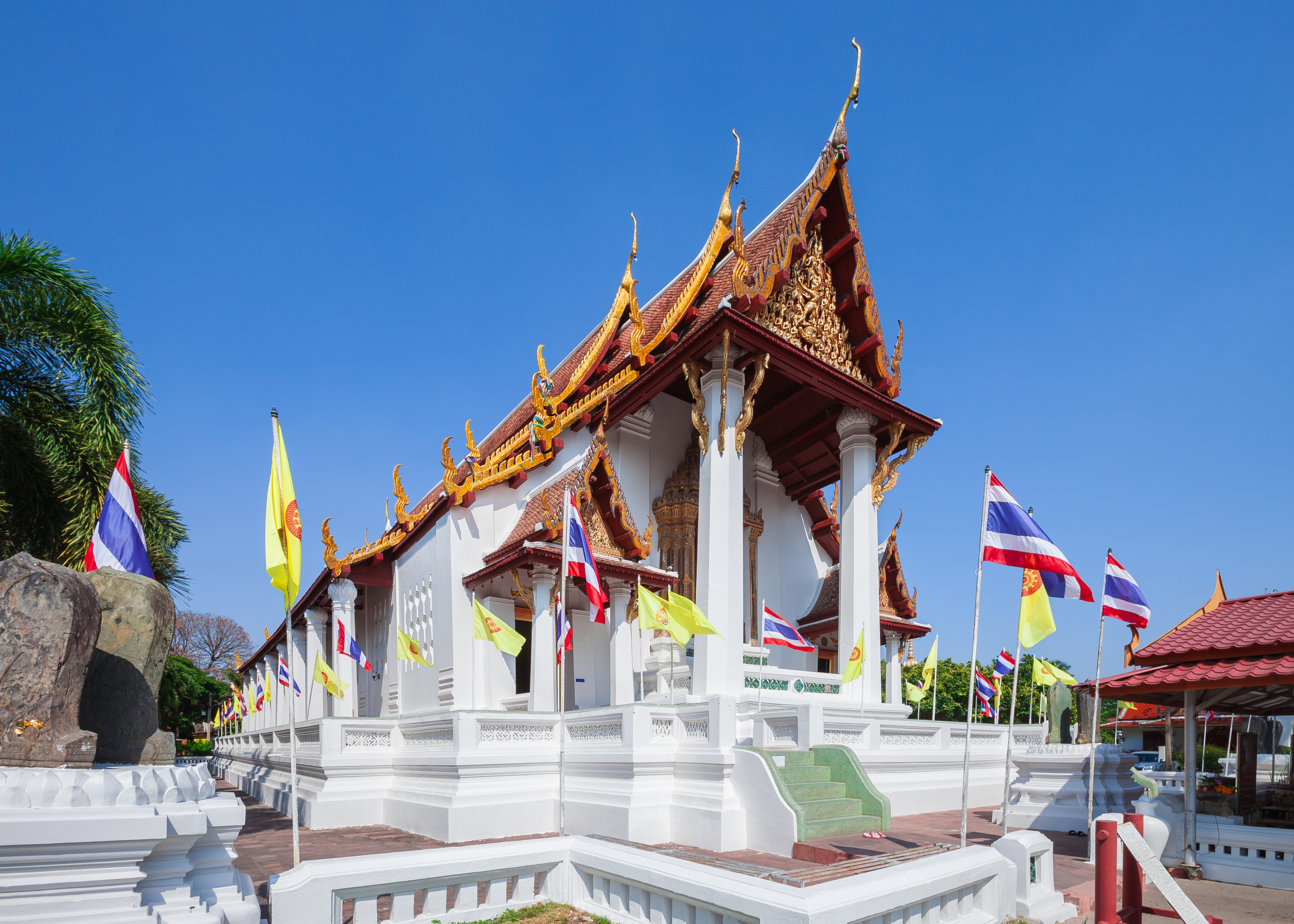
Wat Na Phra Men, Ayutthaya

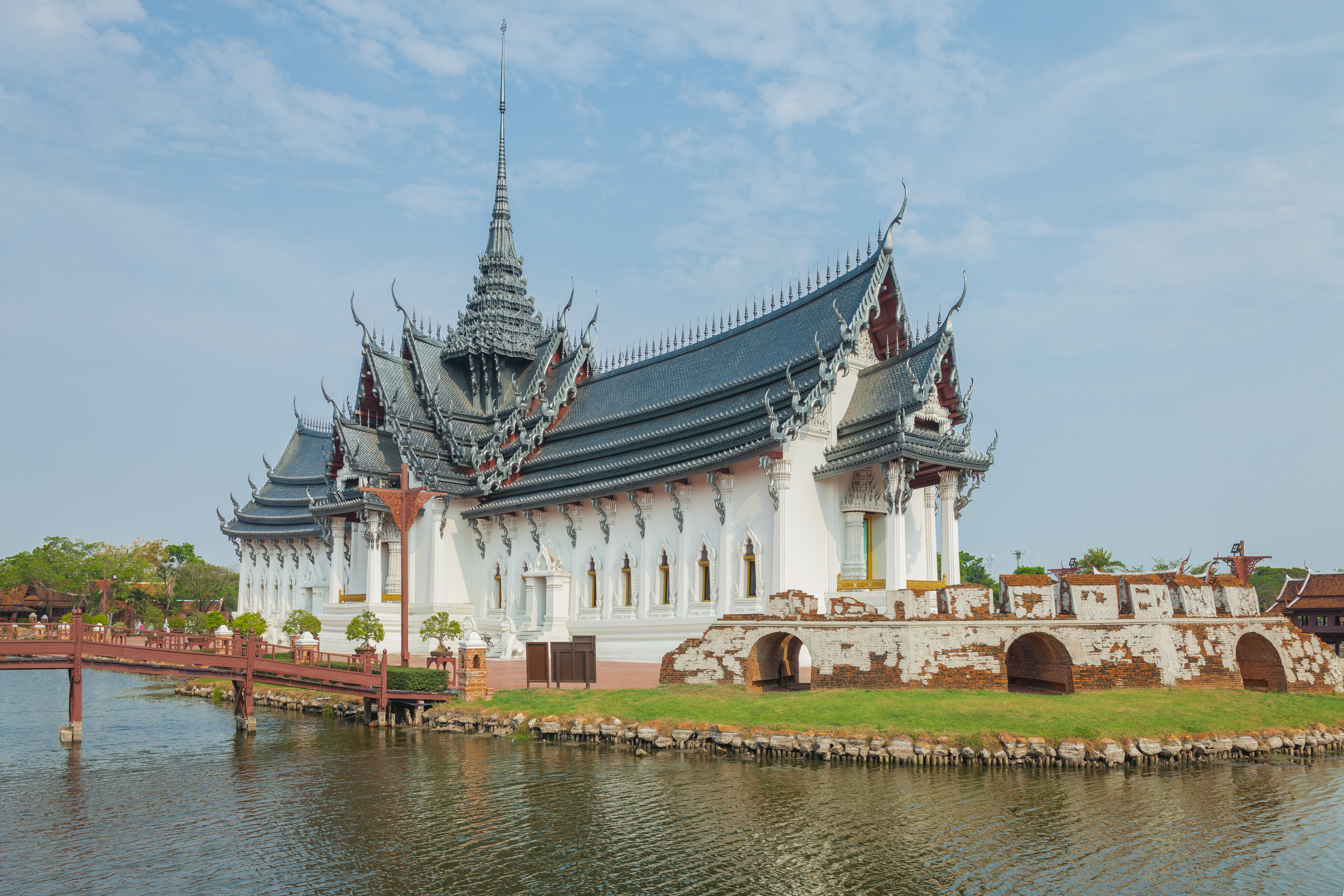
Replica of Sanphet Prasat Palace at Ancient Siam in Samut Prakan.

== Rattanakosin era ==
During the reign of King Rama III, Thai art and architecture was influenced by Chinese styles, through trade and diplomacy. Chinese-style buildings were called Keng (Thai: เก๋ง) or Keng Chin (Thai: เก๋งจีน) derived from the Teochew word 宮 (gêng, “palace, temple; shrine”). Keng had already existed since the Ayutthaya period but most of them were destroyed, due to the war with the Burmese. King Rama IV, Rama V, and Rama VI often built in Western-style or Hybrid-style.

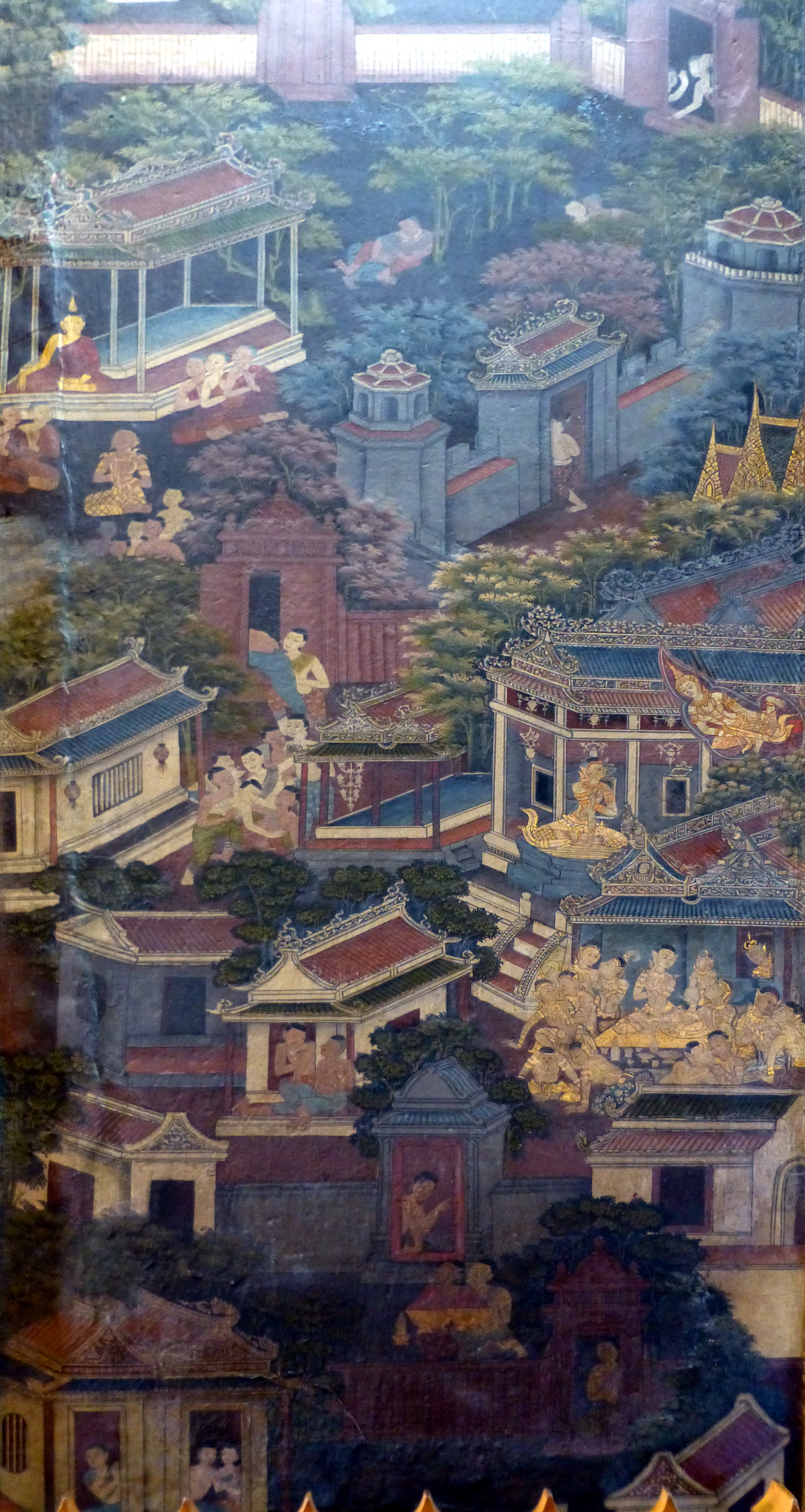
Mural Painting of Wat Pho

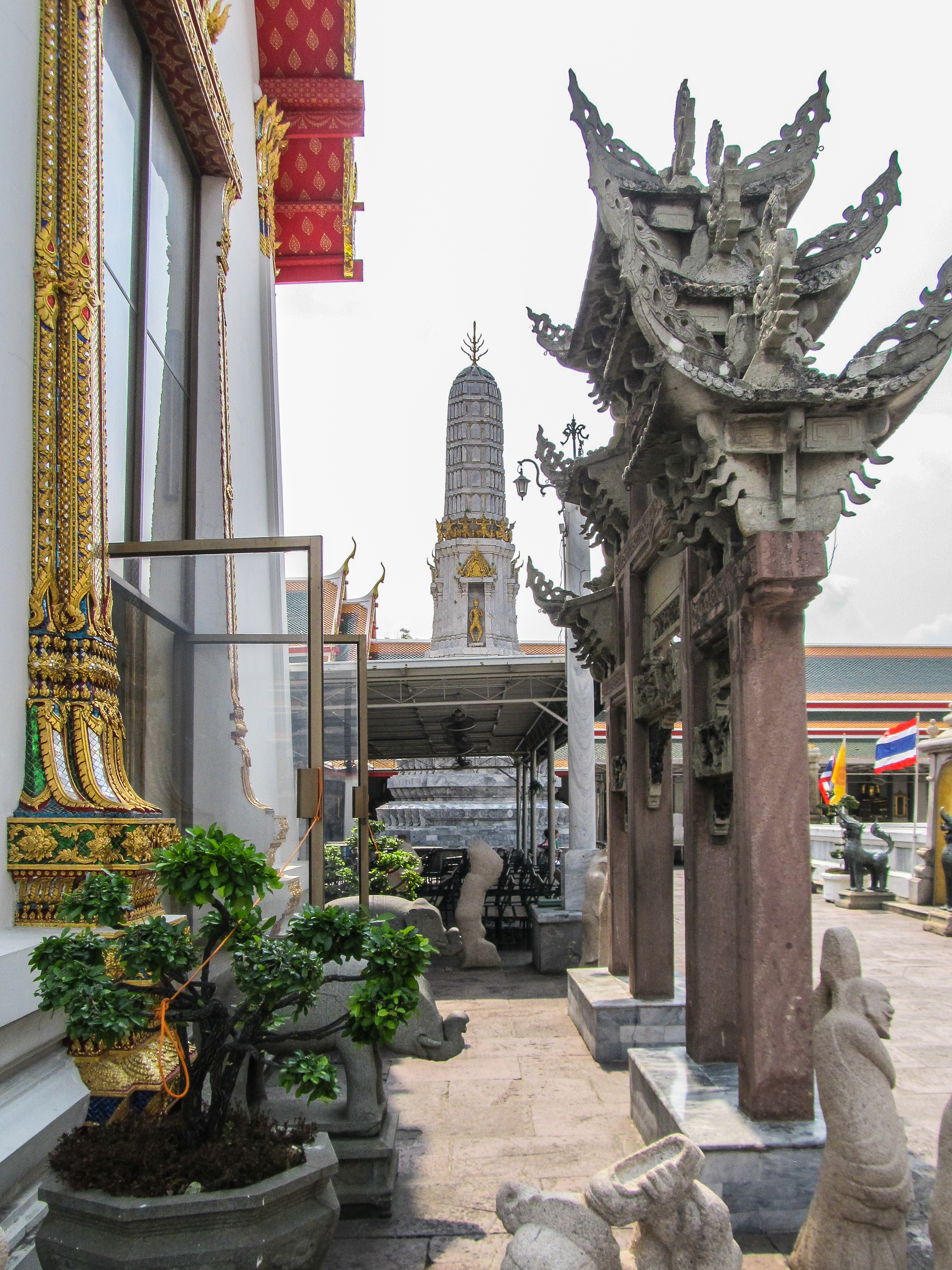
Paifang at Wat Pho

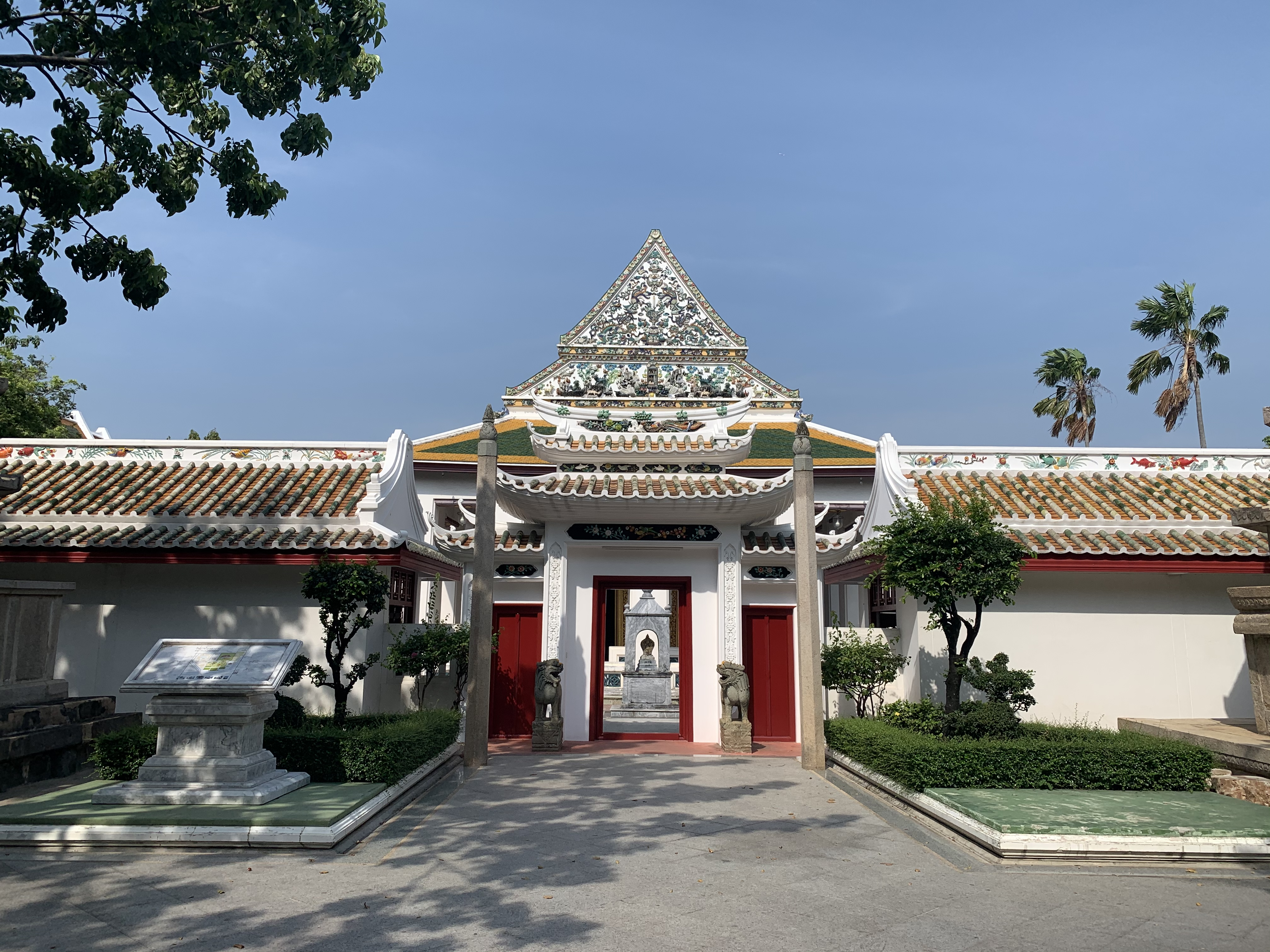
Thai-Chinese temple, rebuilt during the reign of King Rama III, located at Wat Ratchaorotsaram, Bangkok

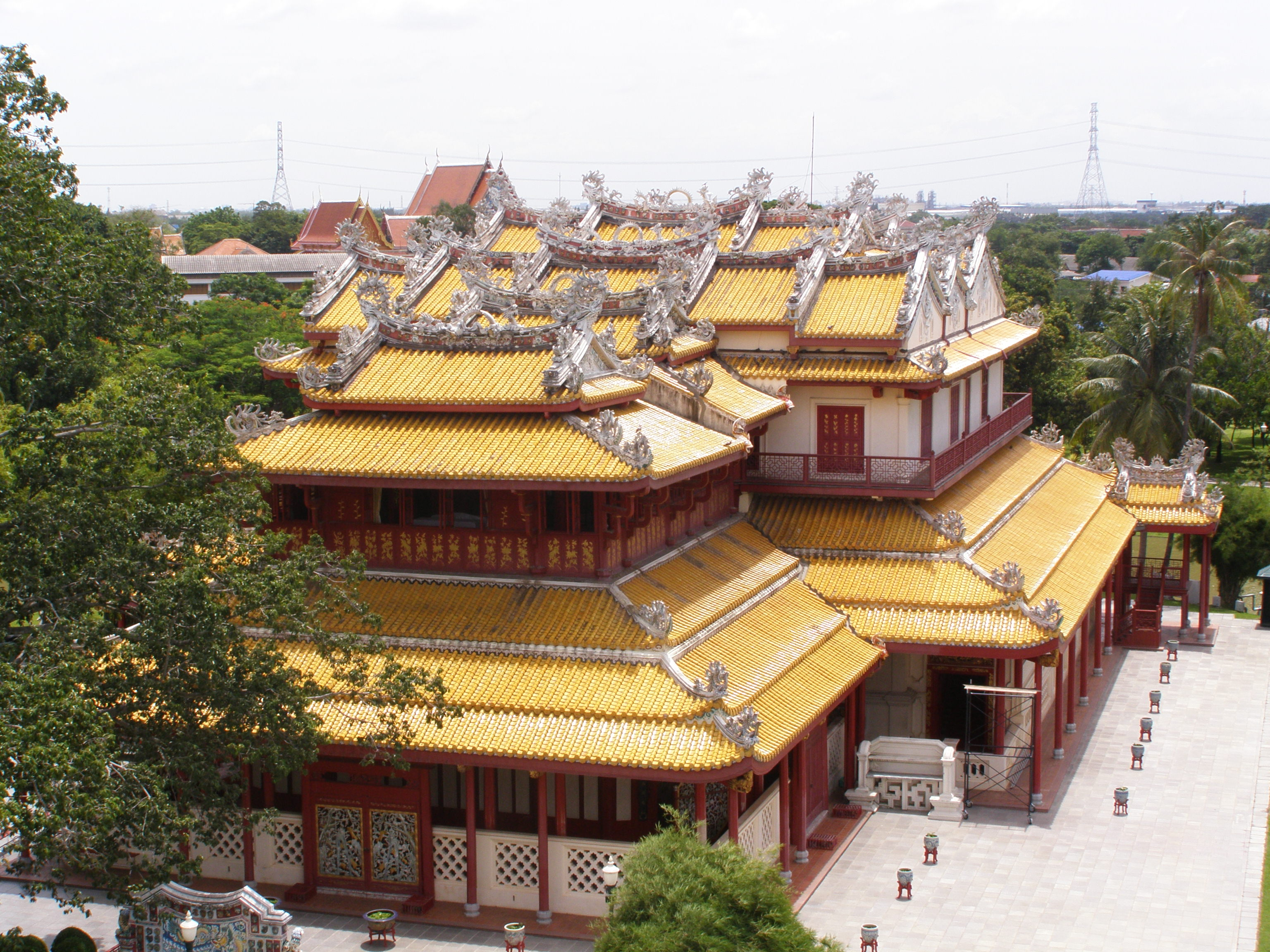
Wehart Chamrun Residential Hall, built in King Rama V period, located at Bang Pa-In Royal Palace

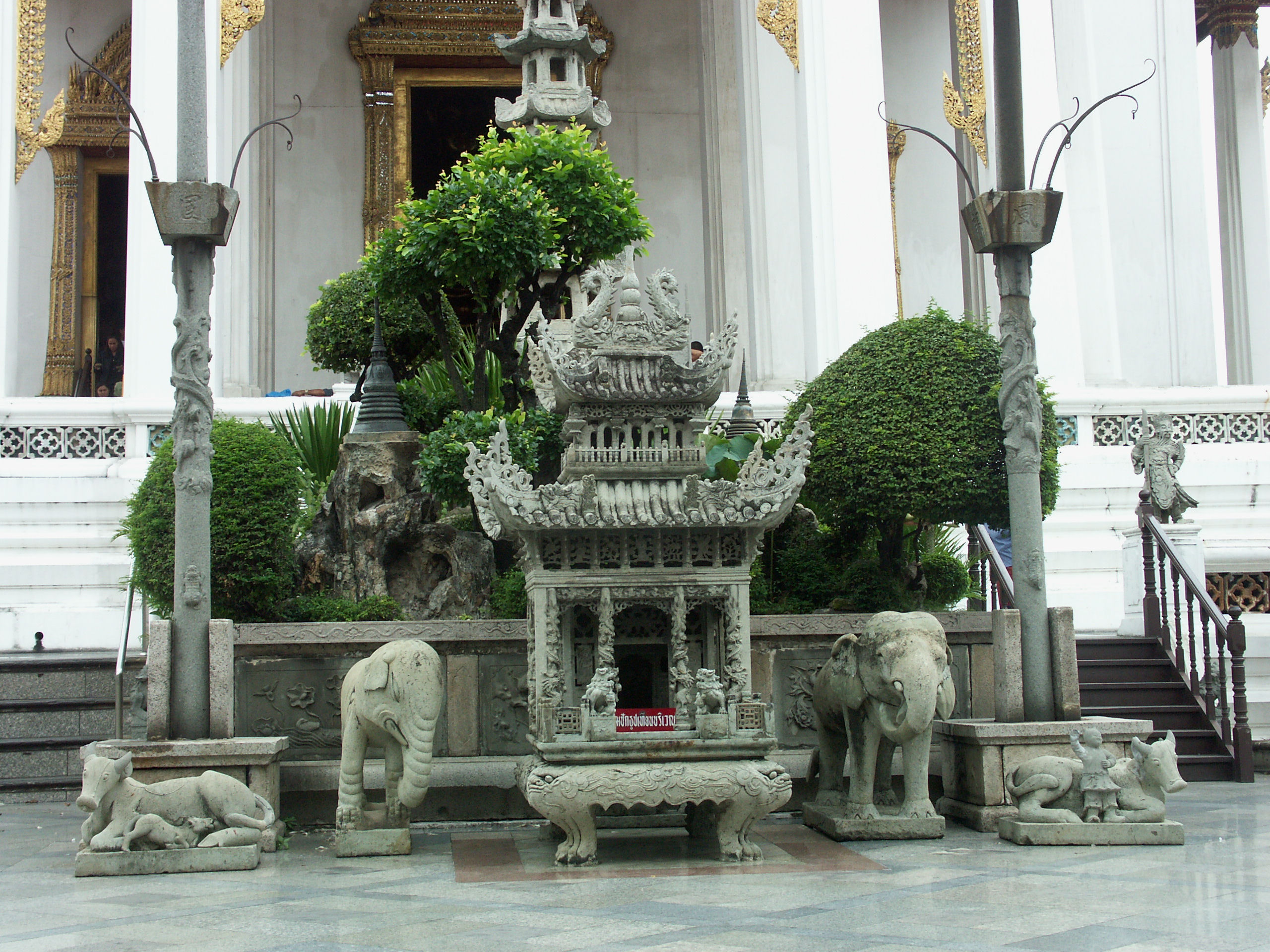
A stone Chinese temple style incense burner between two stone elephants, located at Wat Suthat

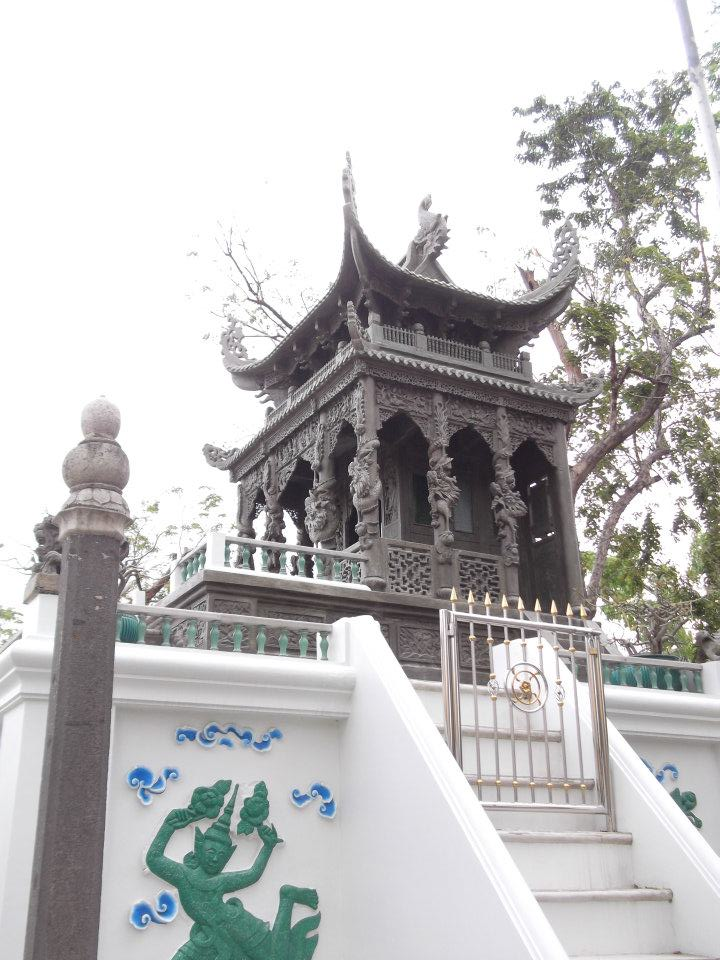
Keng Chin located at Wat Suthat

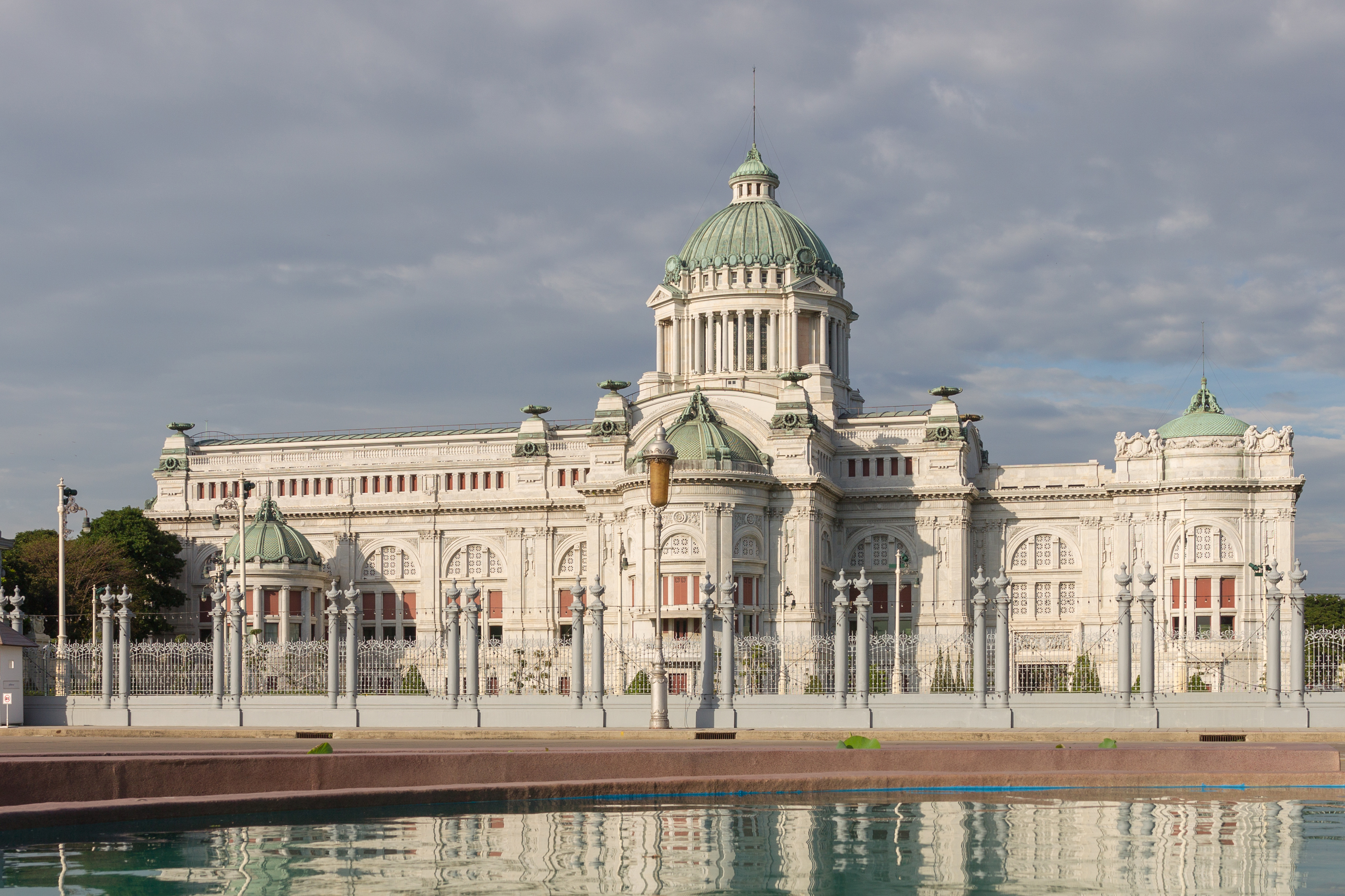
The Ananta Samakhom Throne Hall, Western-style built in King Rama V period, located at Dusit Palace

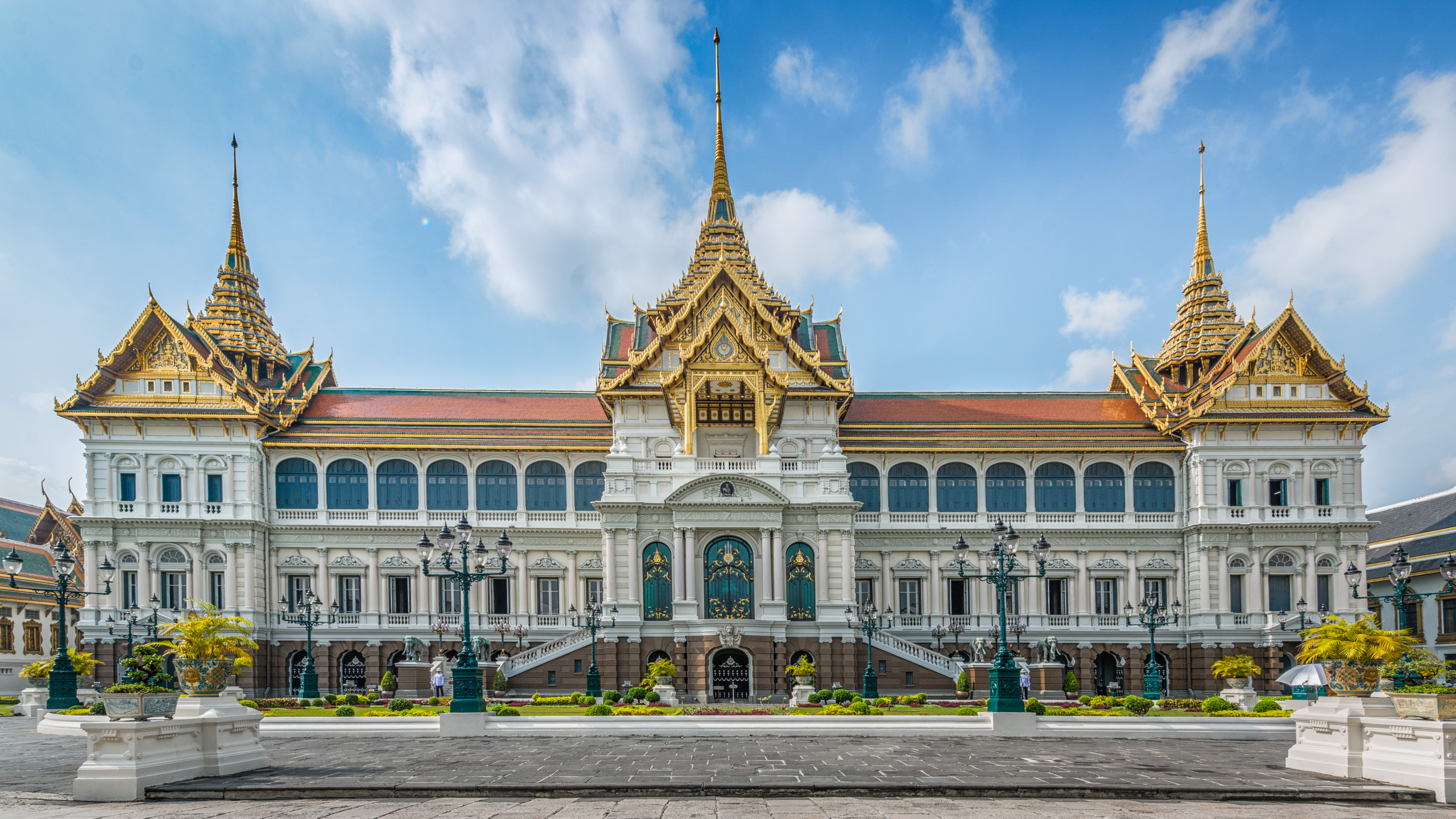
The Chakri Maha Prasat, Hybrid-style built in King Rama V period, located at Grand Palace

== Traditional Thai houses ==
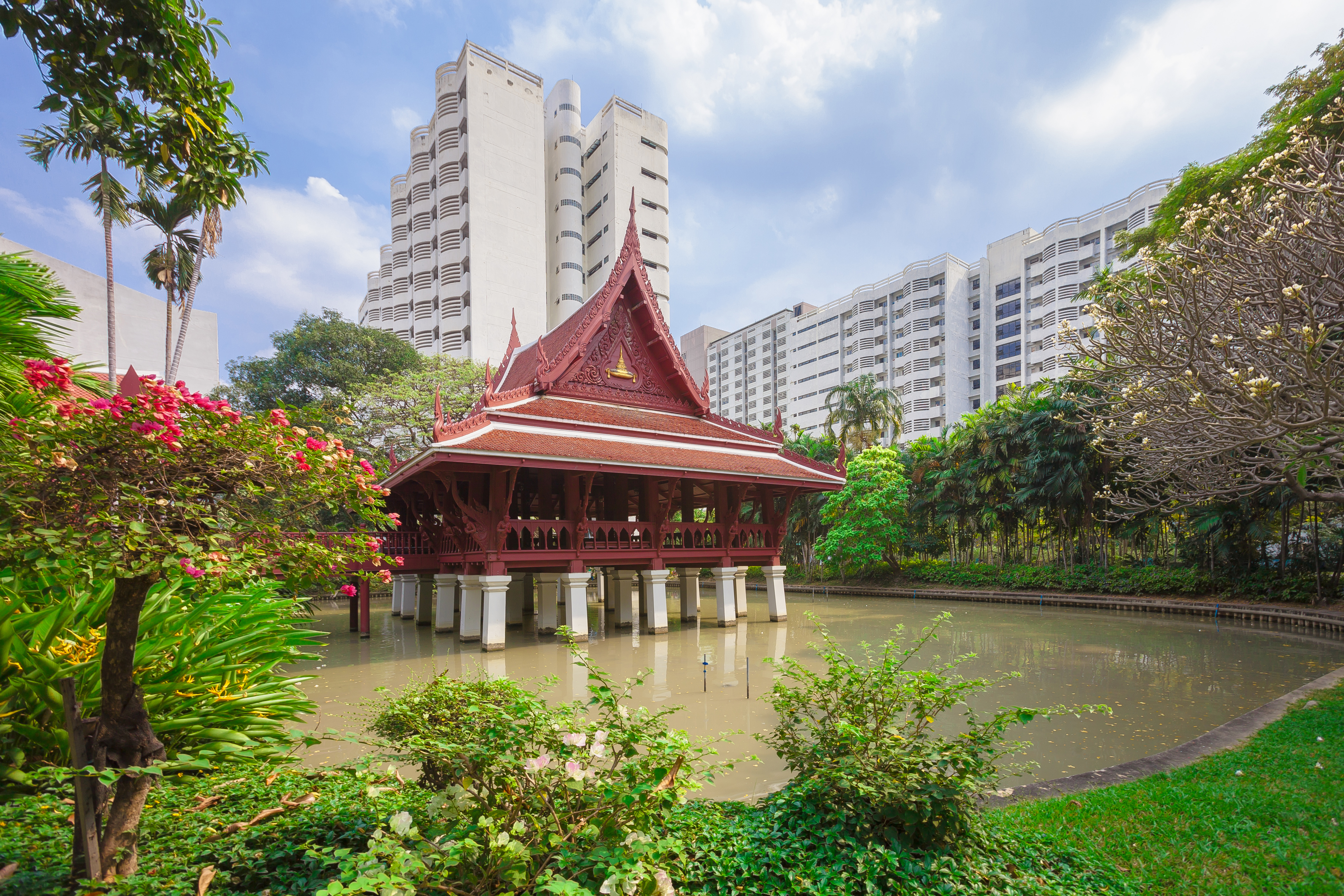
Thai Traditional House at Chulalongkorn University

One universal aspect of Thailand's traditional architecture is the elevation of its buildings on stilts, most commonly to around head height. The area beneath the house is used for storage, crafts, lounging in the daytime, and sometimes for livestock such as chickens or ducks. The houses were raised due to the fact that many Thai villages are centered around rivers and canals, which are subject to flooding during the rain season. Thai building and living habits are often based on superstitious and religious beliefs. Many other considerations such as locally available materials, climate, and agriculture have a lot to do with the style.

Thai houses are made from a variety of wood and are often built in just a day as prefabricated wood panels are built ahead of time and put together on site by a master builder. Many houses are also built with bamboo, a material that is easily constructed and does not require professional builders. Most homes start out as a single family home and when a daughter gets married, an additional house is built on site to accommodate her new family. Although the house is built with prefab panels that are easy to rearrange, there are taboos against rearranging a house.

A traditional house is usually built as a cluster of physically separate rooms arranged around a large central terrace. The terrace is the largest singular part of the home as it makes up to 40% of the square footage, and up to 60% if the veranda is included. An area in the middle of the terrace is often left open to allow the growth of a tree through the structure, providing welcome shade. The tree chosen is often flowering or scented.

It is important for the Thai people to draw in their natural surroundings by placing potted plants around the terrace. In the past there were strict taboos regarding which plants could be placed directly around the house (in current times these are often ignored for the sake of aesthetics). The level of the floor changes as one moves from room to terrace, providing a wide variety of positions for sitting or lounging around the living areas.

Furniture is sparse and includes a bed platform, dining table, and loose cushions for sitting. Sleeping areas are set up so that the beds are aligned with the shorter end of the room (as sleeping parallel with the length is similar to lying in a coffin). The direction that the head points towards can never be the west as that is the position bodies are laid in before cremation.

=== Kuti ===
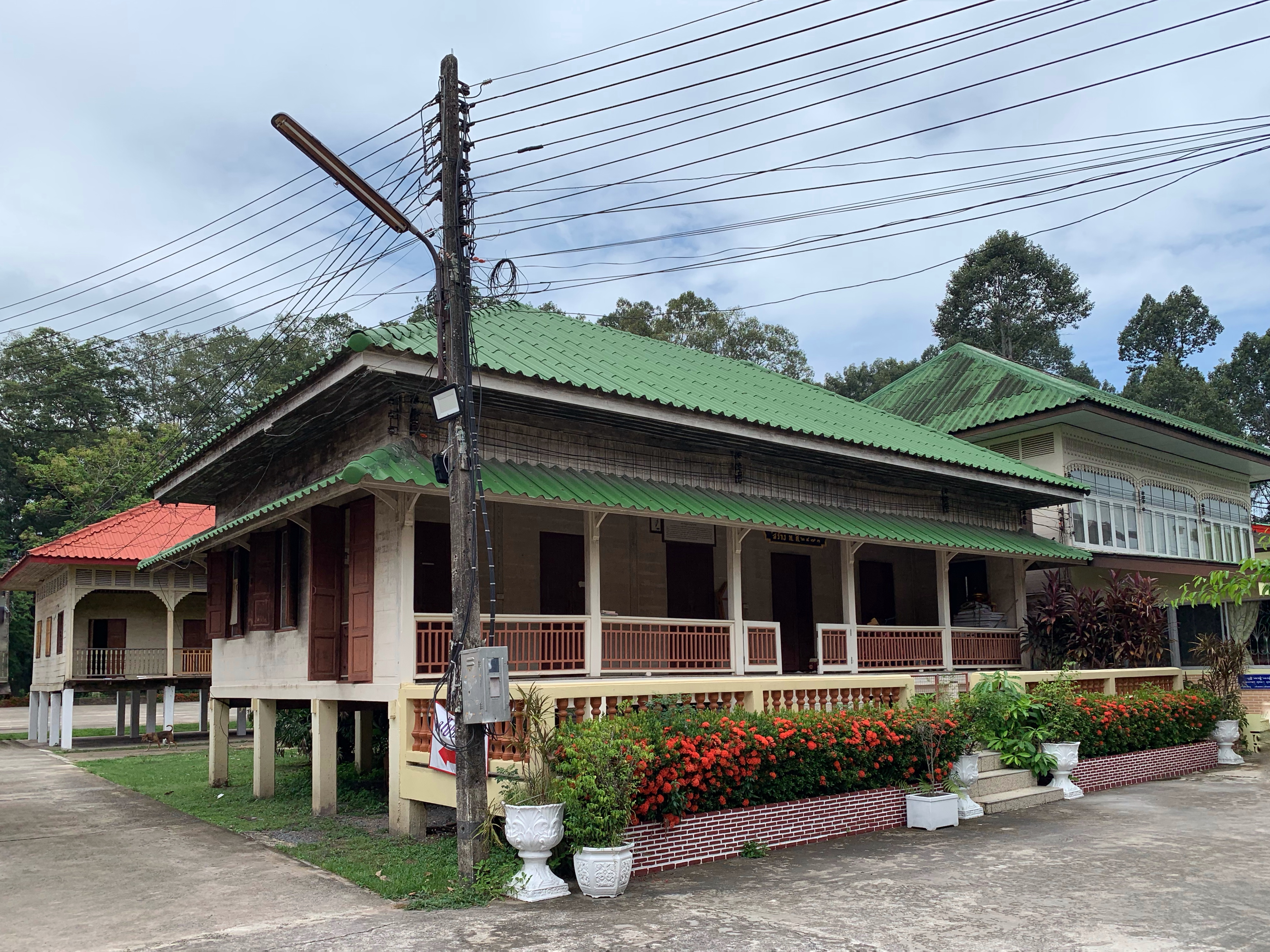
A cluster arrangement of kuti around a central terrace (left), kudis of Wat Udom Thani (right)

A kuti is a small structure, built on stilts, designed to house a monk. Its proper size is defined in the Sanghathisep, Rule 6, to be 12 by 7 keub (or 4.013 by 2.343 meters). This tiny footprint is intended to aid the monk's spiritual journey by discouraging the accumulation of material goods. Typically a monastery consists of a number of these buildings grouped together on a shared terrace, either in an inward facing cluster or aligned in a row. Often these structures included a separate building, called a hor trai, used to store scriptures.

== Religious buildings ==
Thailand features a large number of Buddhist temples, a reflection of the country's widespread Buddhist traditions. Although the term wat is properly used to refer only to a Buddhist site with resident monks, it is applied loosely in practice and will typically refer to any place of worship other than the Islamic mosques found in southern Thailand.

=== Lak Mueang ===
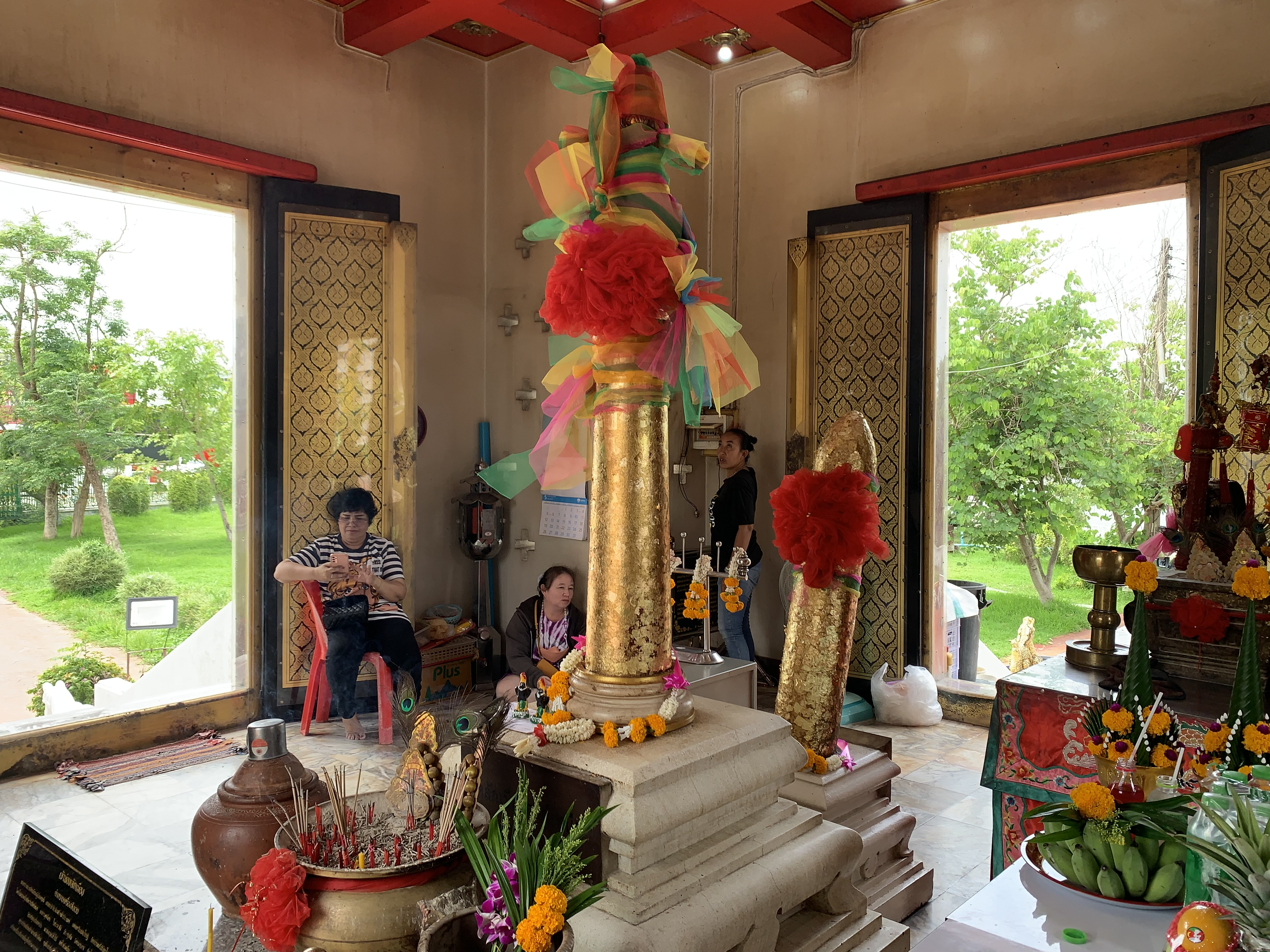
Lak Mueang of Nakhon Nayok Province

Lak Mueang or city pillar is a shrine (Thai: ศาลหลักเมือง) which is also believed to house Chao Pho Lak Mueang (เจ้าพ่อหลักเมือง), the city spirit deity. It was constructed because the continuation of ancient traditions and Brahman's customs believed that it has something to do with the Held, the single city pillar ceremony (Held “Lak Muang”) which is made of an Acacia wood (Chaiyaphreuk) before the construction of the city for a major goal to build a city and to be the centre of soul for the citizens.

== Sala Thai ==
A sala Thai is an open pavilion used as a meeting place and to protect people from sun and rain. Most are open on all four sides.

== Community Places ==
=== Floating market ===
Floating market is a marketplace where goods are sold from boats. it was constructed to connect the rivers. The floating market riverbank adjoined a Buddhist temple and Thai stilt house.

== Cultural use of Thai domestic space ==
=== The sanctification of Thai domestic space ===
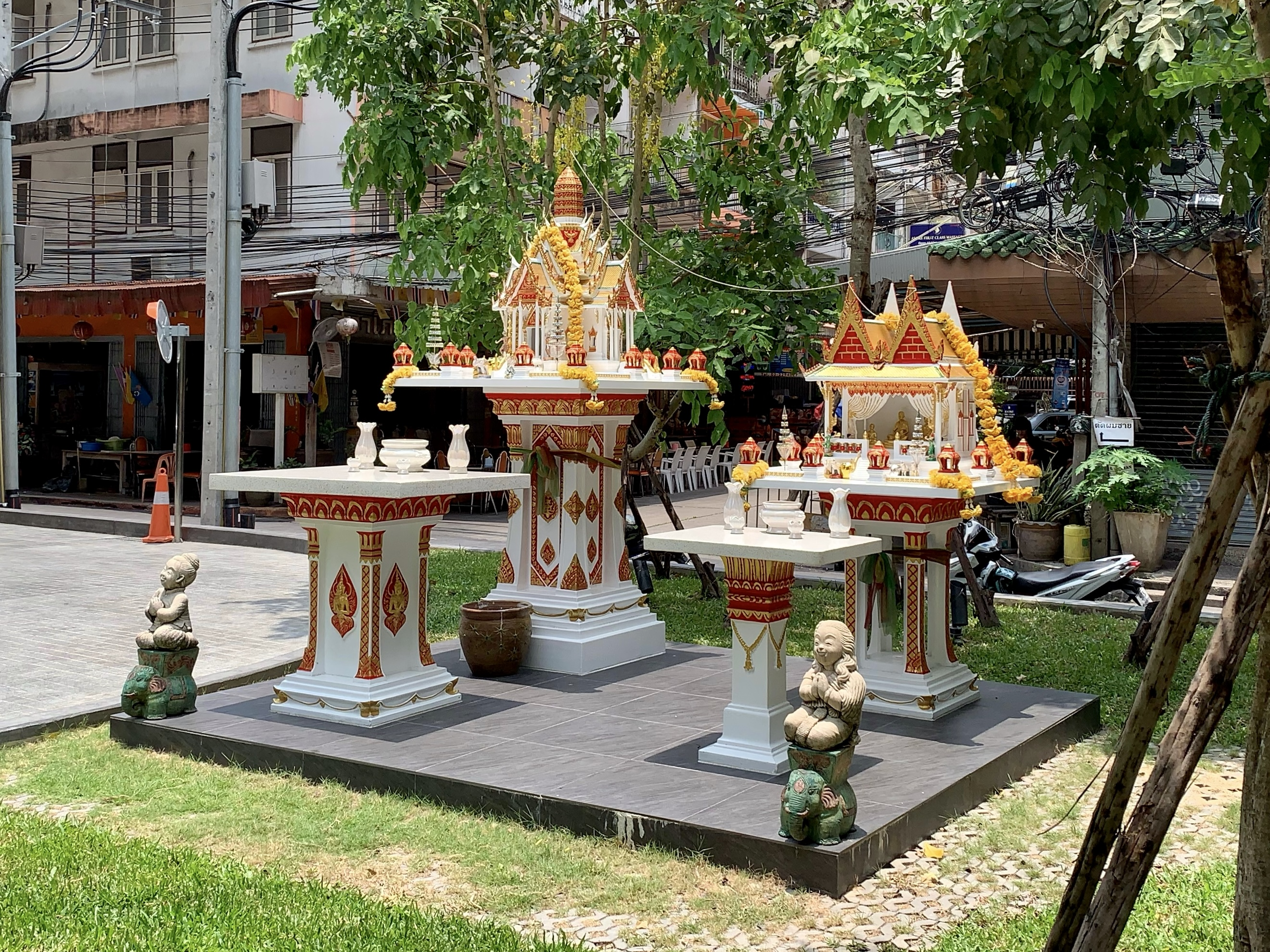
A couple of spirit houses in Bangkok

Houses are one of the essential factors in people's lives. According to Nuttinee Karnchanaporn, "The house always has been the first line of defence against dangers and threats". She argues that how Thai houses are built and how they are lived in can reveal a lot about "cultural fear". The Thai notion of fear centres on the "spiritual world" such as "ghosts, unseen forces, and evil spirits". Thai people heavily rely on "supernatural powers" for protection in the domestic setting.

Thai traditional houses are built in accordance with three ancient principles: "material preparation, construction, and dwelling" (Phraya Anumanrajathon, quoted in Karnchanaporn). Materials, including site and orientation, the taste and smell of soil, and the names of trees that will be used to build houses and so on, will be carefully chosen. Second, the construction must be done mindfully. For instance, only a person of acknowledged spiritual power is allowed to perform a ritual when the first column is put into the ground. The time allotted for that ritual needs to be precisely calculated and fixed. Similarly, construction of the guardian spirit house and proper conduct of the housewarming ceremony are also essential. The third principle is proper behaviour in the completed house. For example, the threshold is believed to be inhabited by "a household guardian spirit", therefore, stepping on it is prohibited. If residents of the house do not follow this precept, spiritual protection will disappear. Another example is that if someone sleeps under the girders, it is believed that ghosts will cause them difficulty in breathing. Taken together, all of these observances serve the purpose of making houses sacred places and pleasing "good" spirits in order to receive their protection against "bad" spirits.

In recent times, building houses following traditional rituals has diminished in popularity due to Western influences. Nevertheless, Thais still recognize the concept of making domestic places sacred. Karnchanaporn explained that in the past, house sanctification rituals were normally observed automatically, and the ways of performing them were passed to younger generations. House owners in those felt protected, given the complicated traditional practices. In contrast, modern people believe that "improper ritual can pollute spiritual protection" and thus, can lead to disaster. Some people try to change the rituals to fit their lifestyle. For instance, an owner does not use the guardian spirit house, but instead decides to use the threshold as an alternative offering place. Another owner does not perform any rituals at all, as she is afraid that performing the rituals improperly might cause problems. Instead, she just prays to the spirits to show her gratitude for their protection.

All in all, Karnchanaporn argues that domestic sanctification is "double-edged", and can be both a benefit and a snare. On the one hand, it assuages peoples' fears of unknown forces. On the other hand, it falsely encourages people not to take responsibility for bad consequences caused by their own actions in their houses.

== See also ==
- Applied Thai architecture
- Royal and religious architectural elements:
  - Indented corners (Thai architecture)
  - Mondop
  - Prang (architecture)
  - Prasat (Thai architecture)
