= Shanghai Translation Publishing House =

Largest comprehensive translation publishing house in the People's Republic of China

Shanghai Translation Publishing House 上海译文出版社
- Founded: January 1978
- Country of origin: China
- Headquarters location: Shanghai, China
- Official website: stph.com.cn yiwen.com.cn

Shanghai Translation Publishing House (上海译文出版社) is the largest comprehensive translation publishing house in the People's Republic of China. Founded in January 1978, it is a member of the Shanghai Century Publishing Group.
