= Tupe =

Tupe may refer to:

- Tupe (Bora Bora), French Polynesia
- Tupe District, Yauyos, Peru
- Vitthal Tupe (1940–2004), Indian politician
- Transfer of Undertakings (Protection of Employment) Regulations 2006 (TUPE), a British labour law
