= Hantra =

Subdistrict in Thailand

Coordinates: 14.377995°N 100.5979935°E

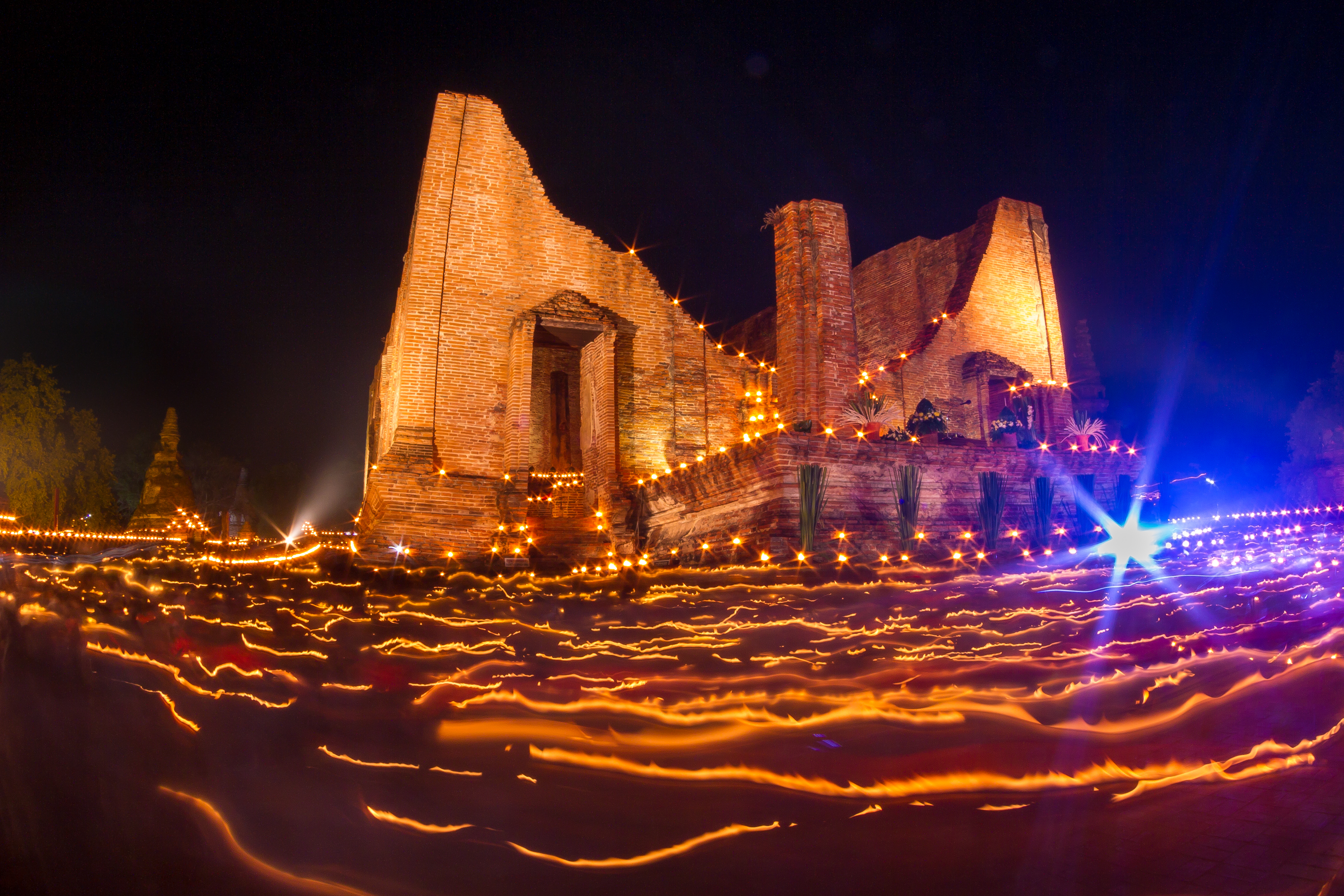
Wat Maheyong, a local ruined temple

Hantra (Thai: หันตรา, pronounced [hǎn.trā:]) is a tambon (subdistrict) and field in Phra Nakhon Si Ayutthaya District, Phra Nakhon Si Ayutthaya Province.

== History ==
Hantra is a historic place, its name is derived from the field in the same name. It was originally called "Thung Uthai" (ทุ่งอุทัย, pronounced [tʰûŋ ʔùʔ.tʰāj], lit: "field of rising sun") and was also the birthplace of Borommatrailokkanat, the eighth monarch of Ayutthaya Kingdom.

Pa Sak River after flowing through the Nakhon Luang District. It continues to flow up till the city of Ayutthaya, when it flows to the area that has both the Chao Phraya River and the Lopburi River confluence. The canal was excavated, creating a shortcut for the waterway and eventually turning the area into an island. Pasak River crosses to the west, where it is referred to as "Hantra River" or "Khlong Hantra" that goes south to the Chao Phraya River at the lower part of Wat Phanan Choeng, where it is referred to as "Pak Nam Mae Bia" or "Pak Khlong Suan Phlu". Therefore, the condition of the city of Ayutthaya is lined on the west bank of the Hantra River and faces directly into the Hantra River or the Pa Sak River.

Hantra Field in the Ayutthaya period was a royal paddy field and used as the site of the Royal Ploughing Ceremony presided over by the King. It was also used as a military training facility, hence the name "Thung Han Kla" (ทุ่งหาญกล้า, pronounced [tʰûŋ hǎːn klâː], lit: "field of courage"). This name has been distorted as "Thung Hantra" until now.

In the contemporary era, Rama IX used to perform royal duties here many times.

== Geography ==
Its geography is a lowland. The Hantra River receive water from the Pa Sak River that flows through every village in the area. There is waterlogging in the rainy season and there was a flood for about 2–3 months per year.

Hantra is located in the southeast of Phra Nakhon Si Ayutthaya District. The distance is about 5 km (3.1 mi) from the downtown Ayutthaya.

It borders the other subdistricts (from the north clockwise): Ban Ko in its district, Thanu and Khao Mao in Uthai District, Thanu in Uthai District, and Phai Ling in its district.

== Administration ==
Hantra is administered by two local government bodies: Town Municipality Ayothya (เทศบาลเมืองอโยธยา) and Subdistrict Administrative Organization (SAO) Hantra (องค์การบริหารส่วนตำบลหันตรา).

The area is also divided into six muban (village) include:

No.	Name	Thai
1.	Ban Chumchon Kheha	บ้านชุมชนเคหะ
2.	Ban Hantra	บ้านหันตรา
3.	Ban Khlong Saku	บ้านคลองสาคู
4.	Ban Ma Tai	บ้านม้าใต้
5.	Ban Wat Dusidaram	บ้านวัดดุสิดาราม
6.	Ban Ma Nuea	บ้านม้าเหนือ

== Transportation ==
Highway 32, often colloquially known as Asian Highway is a main thoroughfare. The minor thoroughfare is Chang Sang Road.

== Neighbourhoods ==
- Wat Dusidaram
- Wat Maheyong
- Rajamangala University of Technology Suvarnabhumi Huntra Campus and Rajamangala University of Technology Suvarnabhumi Stadium
- Memorial Royalty Park
