= Wat Phra Ngam =

Buddhist temple in Ayutthaya province, Thailand

- วัดพระงาม
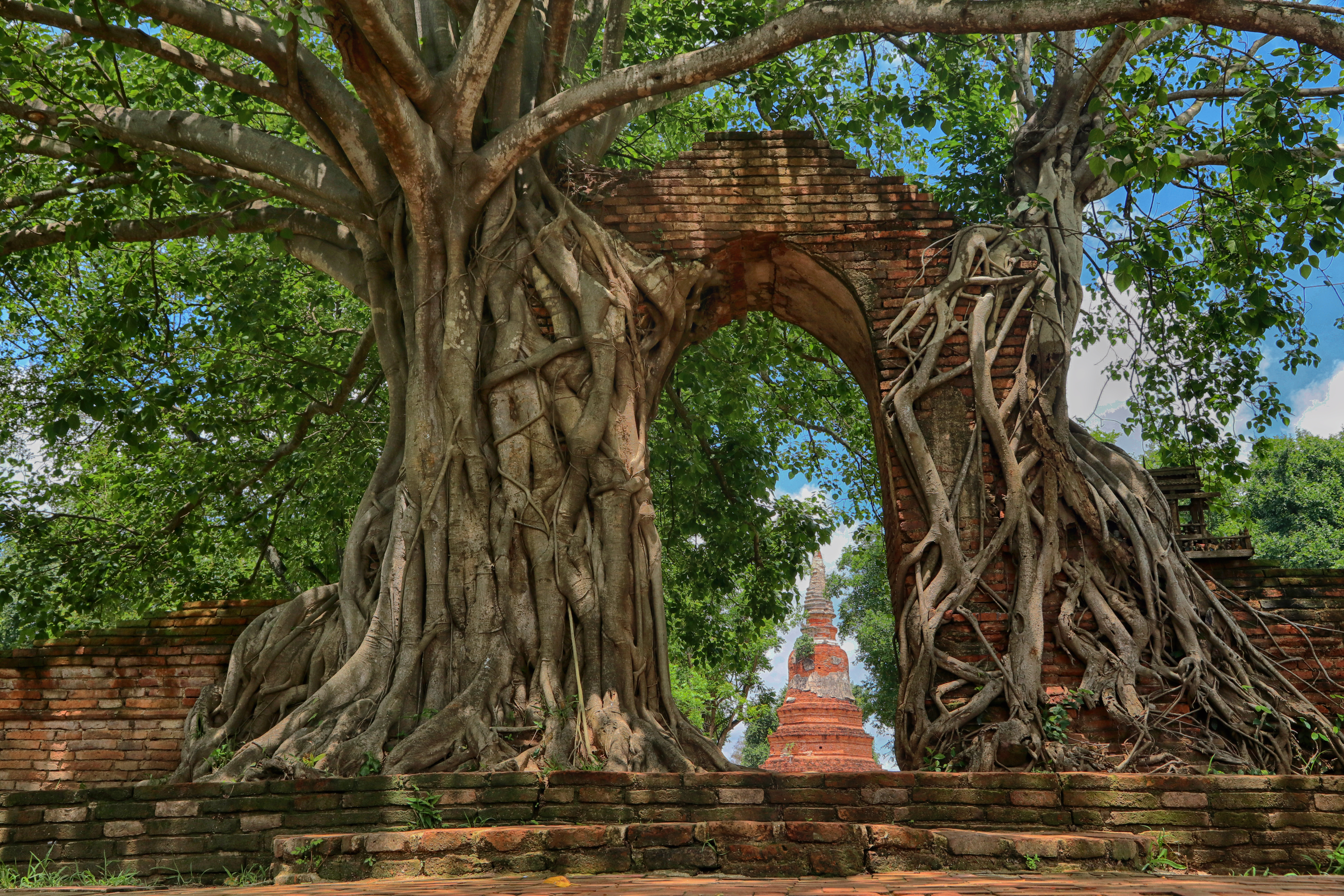

Religion
- Affiliation: Buddhism

Location
- Location: Khlong Sa Bua, Phra Nakhon Si Ayutthaya District, Phra Nakhon Si Ayutthaya
- Country: Thailand
- Interactive map of Wat Phra Ngam
- Coordinates: 14°22′16″N 100°33′19″E

Architecture
- Founder: Unknown

Wat Phra Ngam (Thai: วัดพระงาม), is a ruined Buddhist site in Khlong Sa Bua, Phra Nakhon Si Ayutthaya district, Phra Nakhon Si Ayutthaya province. It was probably abandoned during the second fall of Ayutthaya in 1767. There is no documentary evidence for Wat Phra Ngam. Excavations have revealed that the temple's structure follows the style popular in the early Ayutthaya period and faces east. This temple has a temple gate surrounded by bodhi trees and is nicknamed the 'Gate of Time' because of the sunlight shining through it.

The ruined temple is also notable for its archway framed by Bodhi trees, which has earned it the nickname "Gate of Time". On April 11, 2019, the Department of Cultural Promotion, under the Ministry of Culture, officially designated the Bodhi Tree of Wat Phra Ngam as one of the "Rukkhaka Moradok" (Treasured Trees of the Land) for the fiscal year 2019.

== Archaeological evidence ==
Based on the architectural styles and the diverse collection of artifacts discovered, the site is dated from the Early Ayutthaya period (late 14th to 15th centuries CE) through to the Late Ayutthaya period (18th to early 19th centuries CE). Excavations uncovered a vast array of artifacts, including terracotta and stucco fragments, metalwork, roof tiles, and stucco motifs depicting Nagas, deities, and Thep Phanom (angels in adoration), as well as Chinese-style nails, chisels, caskets (phuob), round-bottomed pots, and stoneware fragments from local kilns such as Ban Bang Pun, Mae Nam Noi, Si Satchanalai, and Sukhothai. The finds also included Chinese ceramics from the Yuan and Ming dynasties.
