= Khlong Sa Bua =

Khlong Sa Bua คลองสระบัว
- Tambon
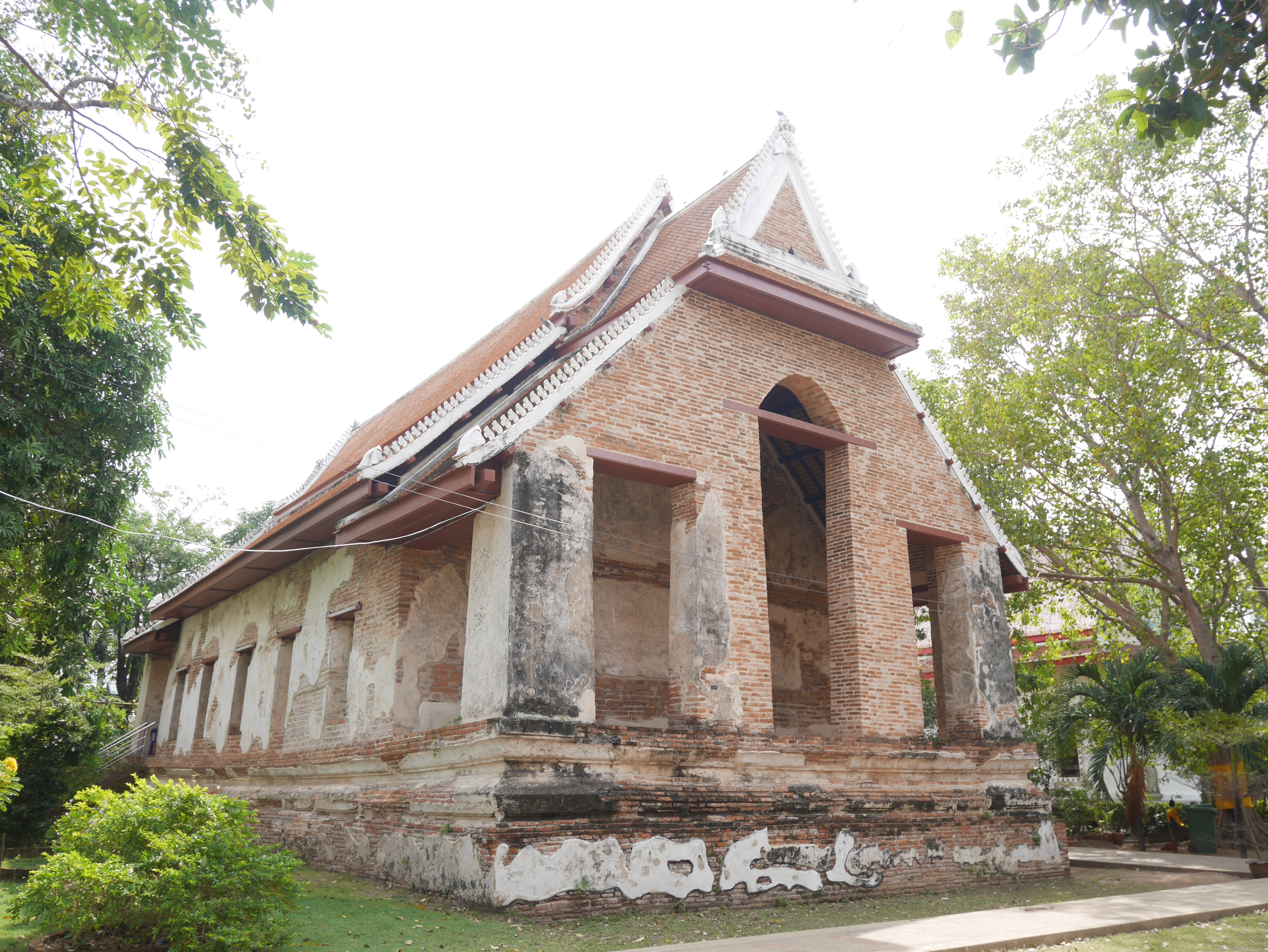
- Wat Mae Nang Pluem in 2018
- Etymology: Sa Bua Canal
- Interactive map of Khlong Sa Bua
- Coordinates: 14°22′12.5″N 100°33′32.4″E
- Country: Thailand
- Province: Phra Nakhon Si Ayutthaya
- District: Phra Nakhon Si Ayutthaya
- Named for: Khlong Sa Bua

Government
  - Type: Subdistrict Administrative Organization (SAO)
  - Mayor: Chatuphon Phanchan
  - Vice Mayor: Thanawan Muisakul

Area
  - Total: 4.65 km^{2} (1.80 sq mi)

Population (2021)
  - Total: 4,147
  - Density: 892/km^{2} (2,310/sq mi)
- Time zone: UTC+7 (ICT)
- Postal Code: 13000

Khlong Sa Bua (Thai: คลองสระบัว, pronounced [kʰlɔ̄ːŋ sàʔ būa̯]) is a tambon (subdistrict) of Phra Nakhon Si Ayutthaya district, the capital district of Phra Nakhon Si Ayutthaya province, central Thailand.

== History ==
Khlong Sa Bua (lit: "lotus pond canal") is named after the khlong (canal) that runs through the upper part of the area. The canal can be considered as a historical place, owing the point where it confluence Khlong Pla Mo (Thai: คลองปลาหมอ, pronounced [kʰlɔ̄ːŋ plāː mɔ̌ː]) was the place where the promoters planned to overthrow the power of Khun Worawongsathirat, the usurper Ayutthaya ruler, led by Khun Pirenthorathep (later King Maha Thammaracha), assassinated him while traveling to capture white elephant at Lopburi via royal barge procession.

In addition, Wat Chao Ya, the canalside Buddhist temple was also believed to be the place where Khun Worawongsathirat consort, Lady Si Sudachan, fled to shore and was slayed along with her daughter who was born to Khun Worawongsathirat.

When the rebellion was successful, the promoters invited Prince Thianracha to be King Maha Chakkraphat, the 15th king of Ayutthaya. These events took place in 1548.

Khlong Sa Bua and Khong Pla Mo had all been main transportation routes since the early Ayutthaya period. Although nowadays they have been greatly reduced in importance. Wat Chao Ya is currently just an abandoned historical site.

== Geography ==
Khlong Sa Bua is an area situated off the Ayutthaya island (downtown Ayutthaya) to northwest about 5 km (3.1 mi). Its adjoining other subdistricts, clockwise from north, are Suan Phrik, Ban Ko, Hua Ro, Tha Wasukri, and Lumphli. It has an area of 4.65 km^{2} (2,906 rai).

The area is quasi-rural, Khlong Sa Bua is a main watercourse. It is an ancient canal that was dug to connect and to provide a shortcut between the royal palace and Khlong Chang. A very important waterway at the north of the Ayutthaya island. it runs from the Lopburi river or Khlong Mueang, near Wat Na Phra Men. Then it flows through numerous ancient ruins and temples on both banks of the waterway. As it flows back towards the south, it passes the Elephant Kraal and the other temples before once more linking with the Lopburi river around Hua Ro.

Baan Thai Ayutthaya Khlong Sra Bua, the elegant traditional Thai house is commonly used as filming location and restaurant for tourists, lies just outside the Khlong Sa Bua boundary in the neighbouring Lumphli subdistrict.

== Administration ==
Khlong Sa Bua is administered by the Subdistrict Administrative Organization (SAO) Khlong Sa Bua (องค์การบริหารส่วนตำบลคลองสระบัว) and some of it depends on city of Phra Nakhon Si Ayutthaya.

The seal of SAO Khlong Sa Bua features three lotuses rose from the water.

The area also consists of six administrative muban (village).

No.	Name	Thai
1.	Ban Pha Niant	บ้านเพนียด
2.	Ban Khlong Sa Bua	บ้านคลองสระบัว
3.	Ban Khlong Sa Bua	บ้านคลองสระบัว
4.	Ban Khlong Sa Bua	บ้านคลองสระบัว
5.	Ban Khlong Sa Bua	บ้านคลองสระบัว
6.	Ban Hom	บ้านหอม

== Population ==
In 2021 it had a total population of 4,147 people (2,018 men, 2,129 women) in 1,201 households.

More than half of the population works as farmers.

== Places ==
- Wat Klang Khlong Sa Bua
- Wat Chao Ya (ruin)
- Wat Si Pho
- Wat Phra Ngam (known as "portal of time")
- Wat Takrai (ruin)
- Wat Chong Klom (ruin)
- Wat Kruttharam
- Wat Mae Nang Pluem (ruin)
- Wat Intharam

== Ceramic pottery, tiles and bricks area ==
Khlong Sa Bua has been the home to many potters and producers of ceramic roof tiles, stoves and ovens of various kinds since the early days of the former capital. The potters here are famous for their pots for storing medicine, steaming rice, storing sugar and fermented fish. Some residents are even still producing the same traditional ceramic roof tiles that have been used for centuries.
