= Luang Pu Du Phrommapanyo =

Thai Buddhist monk

Personal life
- Born: Du Nusri; April 29, 1904 Uthai District, Phra Nakhon Si Ayutthaya Province, Thailand
- Died: January 17, 1990 (aged 85) Wat Sakae, Uthai District, Phra Nakhon Si Ayutthaya Province, Thailand
- Other name: Luang Pu Du (Thai: หลวงปู่ดู่)
- Occupation: Buddhist monk

Religious life
- Religion: Buddhism
- Order: Mahā Nikāya
- School: Theravada
- Dharma name: Brahmapañño
- Ordination: 10 May 1925

Luang Pu Du Phrommapanyo (Thai: หลวงปู่ดู่ พรหมปัญโญ, 29 April 1904 – 17 January 1990), commonly known as Luang Pu Du, was a Thai Buddhist monk and meditation teacher associated with Wat Sakae in Phra Nakhon Si Ayutthaya Province. He taught meditation and Buddhist practice to monks and laypeople while receiving visitors seeking instruction or guidance.

His teachings emphasized continuous spiritual practice, mindfulness, and heedfulness. He placed particular emphasis on the Triple Gem—the Buddha, the Dhamma, and the Sangha—as an inner refuge, and taught the use of amulets as aids to meditation and mental cultivation. His monastic life also included periods of tudong, an ascetic wandering practice.

Luang Pu Du died at Wat Sakae on 17 January 1990, aged 85, after 65 years in the monkhood. A special royal cremation ceremony was held on 20 April 1991.

== Early life ==
Du was born Du Nusri (Thai: ดู่ หนูศรี) on 29 April 1904, which coincided with Vesak Day, in Ban Khao Mao, Uthai district, Phra Nakhon Si Ayutthaya, Thailand. He was the youngest of three children of Phut Nusri and Phum Nusri. His parents were farmers who also made and sold traditional Thai sweets outside the farming season. His older siblings were Thongkham Sunimit and Sum Phuengkuson.

During his infancy, an unusual incident occurred during the flooding season. While his parents were preparing sweets, Du and his cushion rolled from an outdoor veranda into the floodwaters. He did not sink but remained afloat, drifting until he became caught against a nearby fence, where the family's dog found him and barked to alert his mother. The incident led his mother to believe that her son possessed exceptional spiritual merit.

Du was orphaned at a young age. His mother died during his infancy, and his father died when he was four years old. He subsequently lived with his maternal grandmother and was cared for by his older sister, Sum. As a child, he received his early education at several local temples, including Wat Klang Khlong Sa Bua, Wat Pradu Songtham, and Wat Niwet Thammaprawat.

== Monastic ordination and training ==
On 10 May 1925, at the age of 21, Luang Pu Du was ordained as a bhikkhu at Wat Sakae in Uthai District, Phra Nakhon Si Ayutthaya. Luang Pho Klan, abbot of Wat Phra Yatikaram, served as his preceptor, while Luang Pho Dae, then abbot of Wat Sakae, and Luang Pho Chai of Wat Klang Khlong Sa Bua served as the two assisting monks in the ordination ceremony. Upon ordination, he received the Dhamma name Brahmapañño (Thai: พรหมปัญโญ).

During his early years as a monk, Luang Pu Du studied Buddhist scriptures at Wat Pradu Songtham under teachers including Chao Khun Nueang, Phra Khru Chom, and Luang Pho Rot. He initially studied meditation under his preceptor, Luang Pho Klan. After Luang Pho Klan's death in late 1926, during Luang Pu Du's second year as a monk, he continued his training under Luang Pho Phao, a prominent disciple of Luang Pho Klan who was also his uncle. He also studied traditional Buddhist literature, including the Jataka tales and the Dhammapada.

=== Tudong pilgrimage and transformation ===
Following the conclusion of the rains retreat in November 1943, Luang Pu Du undertook a tudong from Phra Nakhon Si Ayutthaya. He travelled toward the mountainous regions of Kanchanaburi province, passing through the Buddhist pilgrimage sites of Phra Phutthachai and the Buddha's Footprint in Saraburi province, followed by Sing Buri and Suphan Buri, before reaching Kanchanaburi. There, he stayed in various forests and caves.

According to biographical accounts of his early spiritual practice, Luang Pu Du initially pursued the study and practice of various esoteric disciplines, including those related to invulnerability. At that time, his purpose was reportedly not the pursuit of liberation, but to acquire proficiency in these disciplines. He intended to leave the monkhood and seek revenge on those who had twice robbed his parents' home. After completing his study and practice, however, he reflected on his state of mind and came to regret allowing resentment and vindictiveness to persist for more than a decade. He subsequently resolved to forgive those responsible and devoted himself to the cultivation of virtue, concentration, and wisdom.

== Practice and legacy ==
Luang Pu Du was known for making himself available to people who came to Wat Sakae seeking his guidance. Before 1947, he decided to stop accepting invitations to travel outside the temple and instead remain at Wat Sakae. He received visitors at his residence from morning until evening, including people who came to listen to his teachings, seek advice about personal difficulties, or request amulets and other religious objects. He continued to receive visitors even in old age and during periods of illness. When explaining his commitment to teaching, Luang Pu Du likened himself to a leading bird and described himself as a teacher to those who came to him. He said that many people came to see him, sometimes even at night, and that when it was time to teach, he had to teach. Some people travelled considerable distances to meet him or seek his guidance, while others came with particular personal concerns or requests. His practice of receiving visitors and responding to their individual concerns formed an important part of his public religious role.

Wax figure depicting Luang Pu Du at his monastic residence at Wat Sakae, Phra Nakhon Si Ayutthaya, Thailand.

=== Teachings on the Triple Gem ===
Luang Pu Du taught the traditional Buddhist refuge formula—Buddham Saranam Gacchami, Dhammam Saranam Gacchami, Sangham Saranam Gacchami—and used it as a meditation phrase within his lineage. He reportedly adopted this practice shortly before 1957. According to these accounts, after completing his evening chanting and personal observances, Luang Pu Du experienced a dream or vision in which he saw three intensely luminous stars and consumed them. While consuming them, he noticed that the stars had a crisp texture, so he ate all three of them. He then awoke.

Upon reflecting on the experience, he came to understand the three stars as representing the Triple Gem—the Buddha, the Dhamma, and the Sangha. When he recited the formula, he experienced an intense sense of spiritual joy (Pīti) and a profound conviction that the Triple Gem was the foundational root of Buddhism. He subsequently adopted the formula as his meditation word and continued to use it thereafter. His emphasis was on mental cultivation rather than reliance on external objects. When people approached him seeking amulets, he directed them toward cultivating an inner refuge, instructing them:

"Why take external goodness? Why not take internal goodness? The Buddham, Dhammam, and Sangham—this is the true treasure."

=== Moral conduct and spiritual practice ===
Luang Pu Du regarded sīla (ethical discipline) as a foundation of spiritual practice. He taught that maintaining the precepts depended not only on observance itself but also on the intention to uphold them and the wisdom to examine and correct one's conduct. He also stressed the importance of avoiding harm in thought, speech, and action, expressing the principle simply: “A good person does not strike anyone.”

Gratitude toward one's parents was another aspect of his teaching. He reminded people not to forget their parents at home while visiting different temples to pay respects to monks, and taught that making merit with one's parents was comparable to making merit with an arahant, a person regarded in Buddhism as fully liberated. He also emphasized heedfulness and continuous spiritual practice. He compared the mind to the body, noting that just as the body requires food, the mind requires meditation and mindfulness as its nourishment. He advised practising while in good health, since illness and old age could make practice more difficult, and stressed the uncertainty of the time of death. He encouraged consistent spiritual practice in daily life. To emphasize this, he reminded his students:

"If you fail to practice for even a single day, the loss is immense. Every single day holds meaning. I leave this with you as homework to contemplate."

=== View on amulets ===
According to accounts of his teachings, Luang Pu Du created, or permitted the creation of, amulets and images of the Buddha because he considered them beneficial to people who still needed external spiritual support. He reportedly taught that attachment to a sacred object was preferable to attachment to harmful or unwholesome worldly objects. Luang Pu Du placed greater emphasis on Buddhist practice and mental cultivation. He encouraged the use of amulets as aids during meditation and other forms of mental practice, including Buddhānussati (recollection of the Buddha), rather than relying on them as guarantees of protection or worldly well-being. In this approach, meditation, mindfulness, and wisdom were regarded as more important than reliance on sacred objects. The amulets he consecrated were also described as containing spiritual energy that Luang Pu Du intentionally imbued in them. This energy was said to help guide and steady practitioners' minds, promoting calm and concentration during meditation, while also strengthening their confidence and reducing fear and anxiety. In this account, the use of amulets supported practitioners' mental development and eventual self-reliance.

The Phra Nuea Phrom (Buddha Triumphing over Brahma) became particularly well known as an amulet associated with Luang Pu Du. Its creation was inspired by the eighth verse of the Bahung chant, a traditional Buddhist victory hymn. The verse recounts the Buddha's encounter with Baka Brahma, who abandoned his claim of supremacy and acknowledged the Buddha's superior spiritual understanding. The amulet was based on this narrative, which is traditionally associated with overcoming pride and delusion. Other notable pieces that became well known among collectors include the Rian Setthee (Millionaire Medal), the Rian Yan Duang (Amulet of Destiny), and the Rian Luang Pu Thuat Poet Lok (Opening of the Three Worlds Medal).

=== Reverence for Luang Pu Thuat ===
Luang Pu Du held Luang Pu Thuat of Wat Chang Hai in high regard and encouraged his disciples to revere and recollect him as a guide in spiritual practice. He described Luang Pu Thuat as a highly accomplished practitioner and once said that Luang Pu Thuat would attain enlightenment in the future as a Bodhisattva. He also encouraged regular recollection of Luang Pu Thuat, particularly when difficulties arose in spiritual practice or daily life. He said that Luang Pu Thuat would always be ready to help, while urging people to persevere in their practice and not become discouraged or abandon it.

Wax figure of Luang Pu Thuat and a Buddha image of Phra Nuea Phrom inside Luang Pu Du's monastic residence at Wat Sakae, Phra Nakhon Si Ayutthaya, Thailand.

Interior of Luang Pu Du's monastic residence at Wat Sakae, Phra Nakhon Si Ayutthaya, Thailand.

In another account, a disciple came to study the Dhamma according to Luang Pu Du's approach. Luang Pu Du replied:

"I am not the teacher. The teachers are the Buddha and Luang Pu Thuat. I am his disciple."

=== Mahāchakraphat chant ===
Luang Pu Du referred to the chant as the "Buddha veneration chant" (Thai: คาถาบูชาพระ) and used it in his devotional practice and for the consecration of amulets made for his own use. When asked which mantra he used in consecrating the amulets he made, Luang Pu Du identified this chant.

Initially, the chant was known only among a small group of his close disciples. Phra Warongkot Viriyatharo (Luang Ta Ma), who became a disciple of Luang Pu Du while still a layman, practiced the chant diligently and continuously for several years. He subsequently began promoting the chant, encouraging others to recite it under the name Mahāchakraphat (Thai: บทมหาจักรพรรดิ), which contributed to its wider recognition and use.

== Death ==
On 16 January 1990, the day before his death, Luang Pu Du instructed a visitor in meditation practice and later met with a group of his disciples. During his final meeting with his disciples, he spoke of the physical pain he was experiencing and said, "I will be leaving soon." He urged them not to abandon their practice and emphasized the importance of heedfulness, comparing continued practice to a boxer entering the ring who must fight rather than merely stand preparing to do so.

Luang Pu Du died from heart disease at his residence at Wat Sakae at approximately 5 a.m. on 17 January 1990, aged 85, after 65 years in the monkhood. His body was kept for funeral rites for 459 days, with Buddhist funeral chanting held daily. A special royal cremation ceremony was held on 20 April 1991, attended by numerous monastics and thousands of followers.

== Works cited ==
- Committee of Disciples (2005). ๑๐๑ ปี หลวงพ่อดู่ พรหมปัญโญ [101 Years of Luang Pho Du Phrommapanyo] (in Thai). Pornsith Udomsilpchinda and Patiphat Patchimsawat.
- Klum Phuean Tham Phuean Tham Group (2009). ตามรอยธรรม ย้ำรอยครู หลวงปู่ดู่ พรหมปัญโญ [Following the Dhamma, Tracing the Teacher: Luang Pu Du Phrommapanyo] (in Thai) (2nd ed.). Q. Print Management.
- Wat Sakae (2026). หลวงปู่ดู่ พระผู้จุดประทีปในดวงใจ [Luang Pu Du: The One Who Lit the Lamp in the Heart] (in Thai) (2nd ed.). Cyberprint Group Co., Ltd. ISBN 978-616-619-545-3.
- Thipphayachak (2016). หัวใจกรรมฐาน จากหลวงปู่ดู่ สู่หลวงปู่ทวด [The Heart of Meditation: From Luang Pu Du to Luang Pu Thuat] (in Thai). Green Panyayan Publishing. ISBN 978-616-526-607-9.
- Liang Chiang Publishing Team (2025). สวดมนต์บันทึกบุญ คาถามหาจักรพรรดิ [Prayers for Recording Merit: The Maha Chakraphat Mantra] (in Thai). Liang Chiang Phian Phuea Phutthasat. ISBN 978-616-268-640-5.
