= Wat Na Phra Men =

Buddhist temple in Ayutthaya province, Thailand

- วัดหน้าพระเมรุ
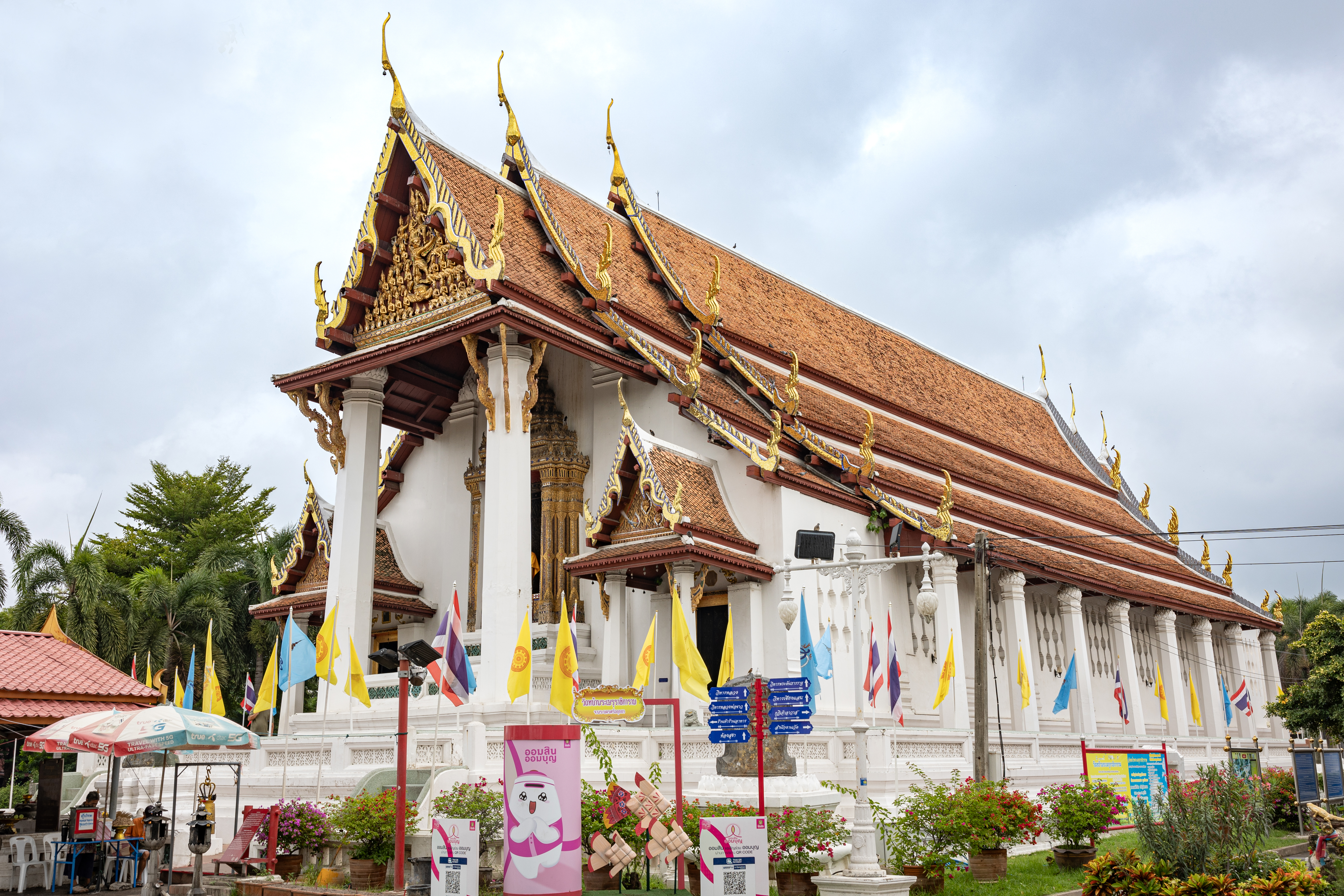
- The ubosot of Wat Na Phra Men

Religion
- Affiliation: Buddhism
- Sect: Theravāda Mahā Nikāya

Location
- Location: 76 Moo 4, Lumphli, Phra Nakhon Si Ayutthaya District, Phra Nakhon Si Ayutthaya, 13000
- Country: Thailand
- Interactive map of Wat Na Phra Men
- Coordinates: 14°21′44.6256″N 100°33′31.323″E

Architecture
- Founder: Unknown

Wat Na Phra Men, also written as Wat Na Phramen (Thai: วัดหน้าพระเมรุ), is located in Phra Nakhon Si Ayutthaya district, Phra Nakhon Si Ayutthaya province, on the northern side of the city moat along Khlong Sra Bua, the former course of the Lopburi River, opposite the former royal palace. Its original name was "Wat Phra Meru Rachikaram", but there is no evidence as to who founded it or in which period it was built. It has been suggested that the temple was established on the site where a king of the early Ayutthaya period was cremated.

According to legend, Prince In (Phra Ong In), in the reign of Ramathibodi II, built the temple in 1503, but there is no firm documentary evidence to confirm this.

Wat Na Phra Men is the only temple in the city of Ayutthaya that was not destroyed by the Burmese, and it survives in very good condition. One explanation is that the Burmese established their military headquarters at this temple together with Wat Hasdavas (which is now abandoned, though some undestroyed structures still remain). The ordination hall (ubosot) of Wat Na Phra Men is in the Ayutthaya style, with interior columns, but additional columns supporting the eaves were probably added later in the reign of Borommakot.

The principal Buddha image in the ordination hall, created or extensively restored in the late Ayutthaya period, is a large crowned bronze Buddha image. Behind the ordination hall there is another, smaller image, representing the future Buddha, known as Phra Si Ariya Mettrai.

== Overview ==
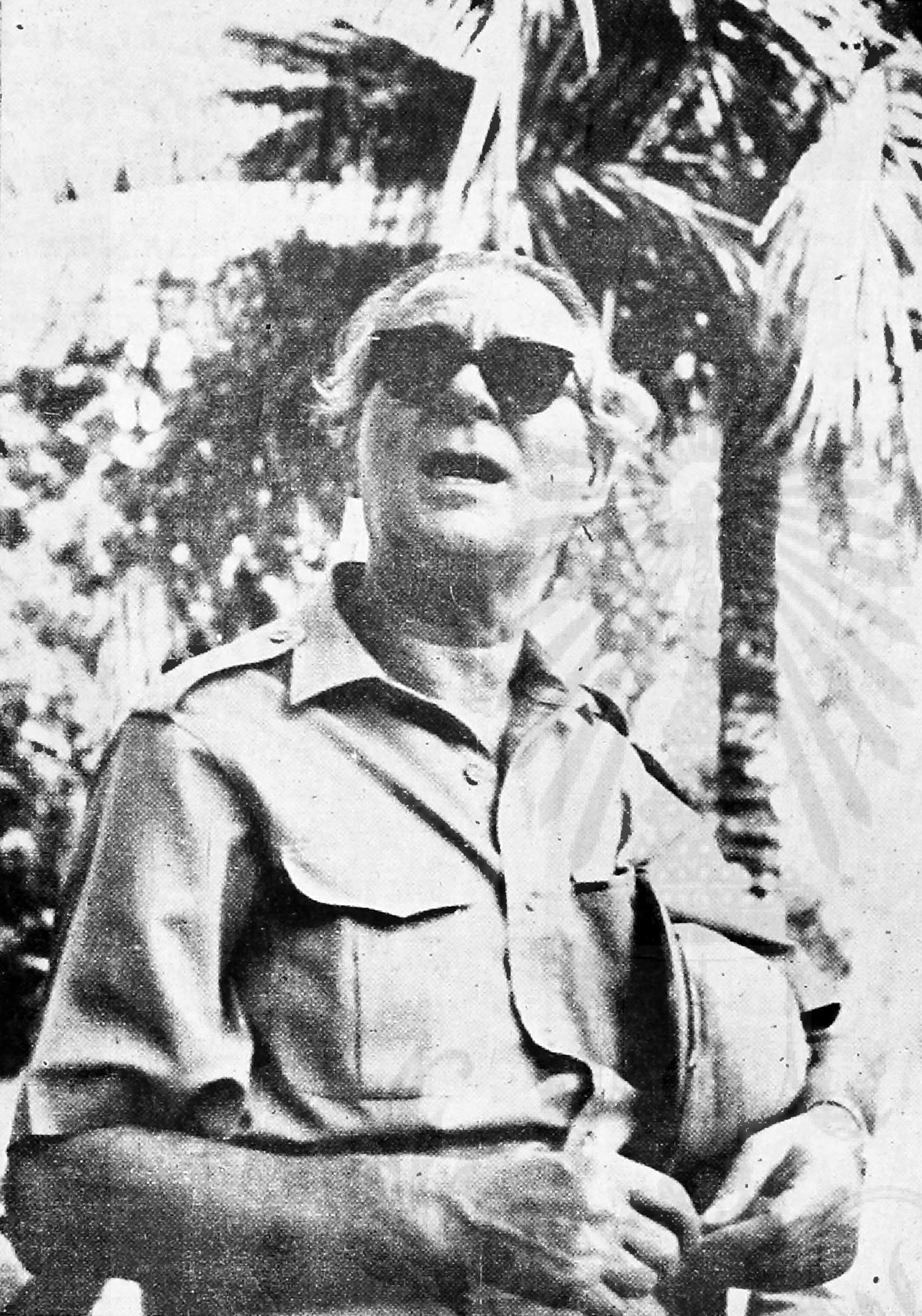
Silpa Bhirasri inspecting Wat Na Phra Men in Phra Nakhon Si Ayutthaya Province, 6 January 1962.

The temple is located along Khlong Sa Bua on the north bank of the Khlong Khu Mueang (the old course of Lopburi River) just opposite the Ayutthaya Royal Grand Palace. Its location can be considered outside the Ayutthaya Island. Previously known as "Wat Phra Merurachikaram" (วัดหน้าพระเมรุราชิการาม).

The temple was built since the time when Ayutthaya was the capital without knowing who built it and the exact year of creation. The name "Na Phra Men", literally translated as "in front of royal cremation", hence it is assumed that it was built as a cremation site for nobility or royal family in the Ayutthaya period.

Wat Na Phra Men is one of the few temples in the Ayutthaya Historical Park that were not burned by the Ava troops during the fall of Ayutthaya in 1767. The temple is therefore still able to maintain its exquisite condition after many renovations during the Rattanakosin period.

The outstanding construction is the ubosot (ordination hall)'s gable is featuring Lord Vishnu mounted on garuda, on top of the demon Rāhu placed between two nāgas and flanked by 26 devas.

The ubosot faces south and measures approximately 50 m (164.0 ft) by 16 m (52.5 ft). Inside there are octagonal columns. The top of the columns were made in the form of closed lotuses to support the large roof. The ceiling was decorated with carved wood and coloured glasses.

The principal Buddha image is seated in the gesture of subduing Māra, and wears royal attire. The Buddha full name is "Phra Buddha Nimitr Vichit Maramoli Sisanpeth Boromtrailokanat" (พระพุทธนิมิตวิชิตมารโมลีศรีสรรเพชญบรมไตรโลกนาถ; abbreviated as Phra Buddha Nimitr) with the lap of 4.40 m (14.4 ft) wide and 6 m (19.7 ft) high. Its name was given by King Rama III.

Another principal Buddha image is "Phra Khanthararaj" (พระคันธารราฐ), which is enshrined inside the viharn noi (chapel) beside the ubosot. It is a green stone Buddha image that is presumed to be more than 1,500 years old, from the Dvaravati period. Considered as one of five seated Buddha images in this type in Thailand which is worth preserved.

The temple is now a recognised ancient monument since 1935 by the Fine Arts Department.

== Gallery ==
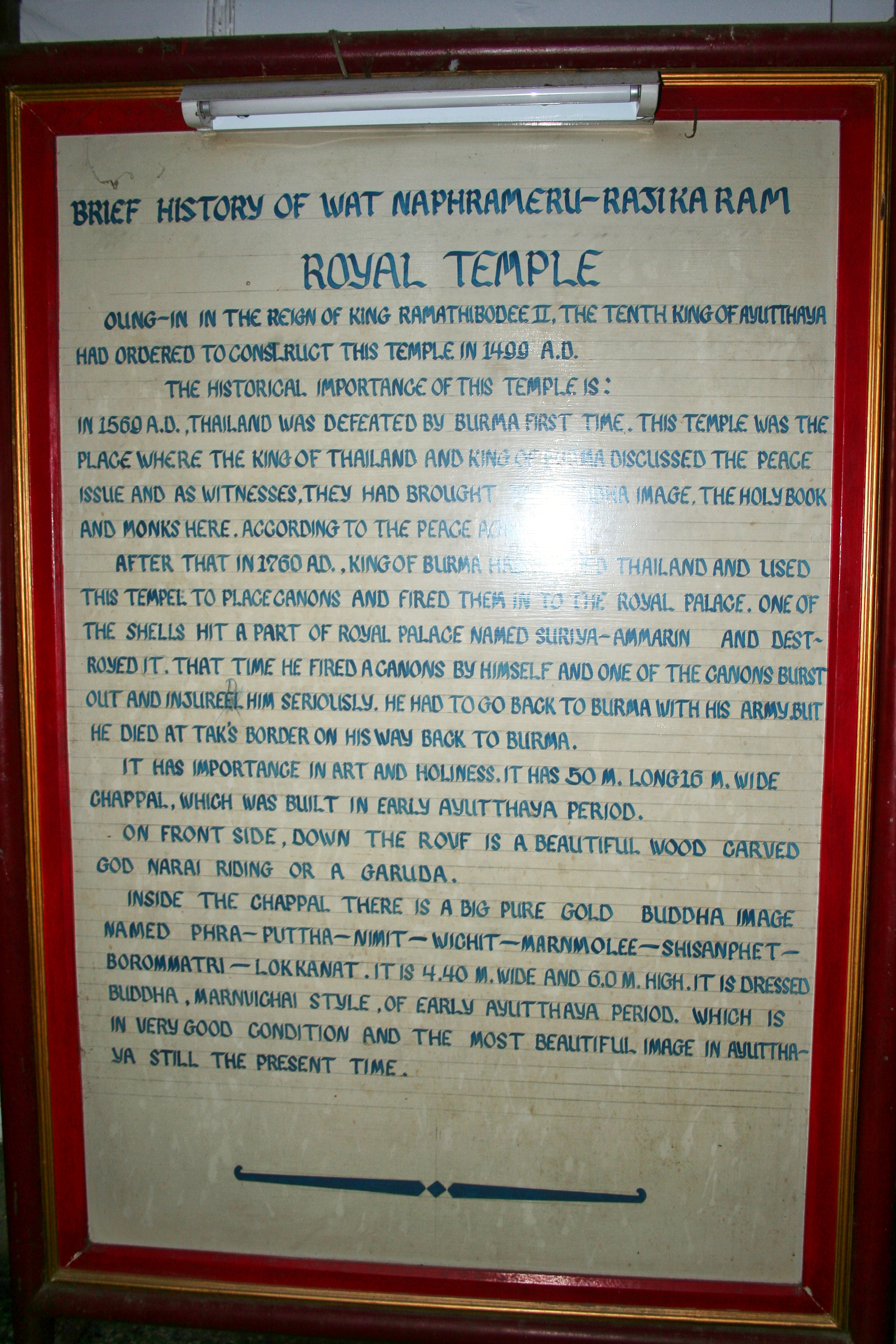
manuscript at Wat Na Phra Men

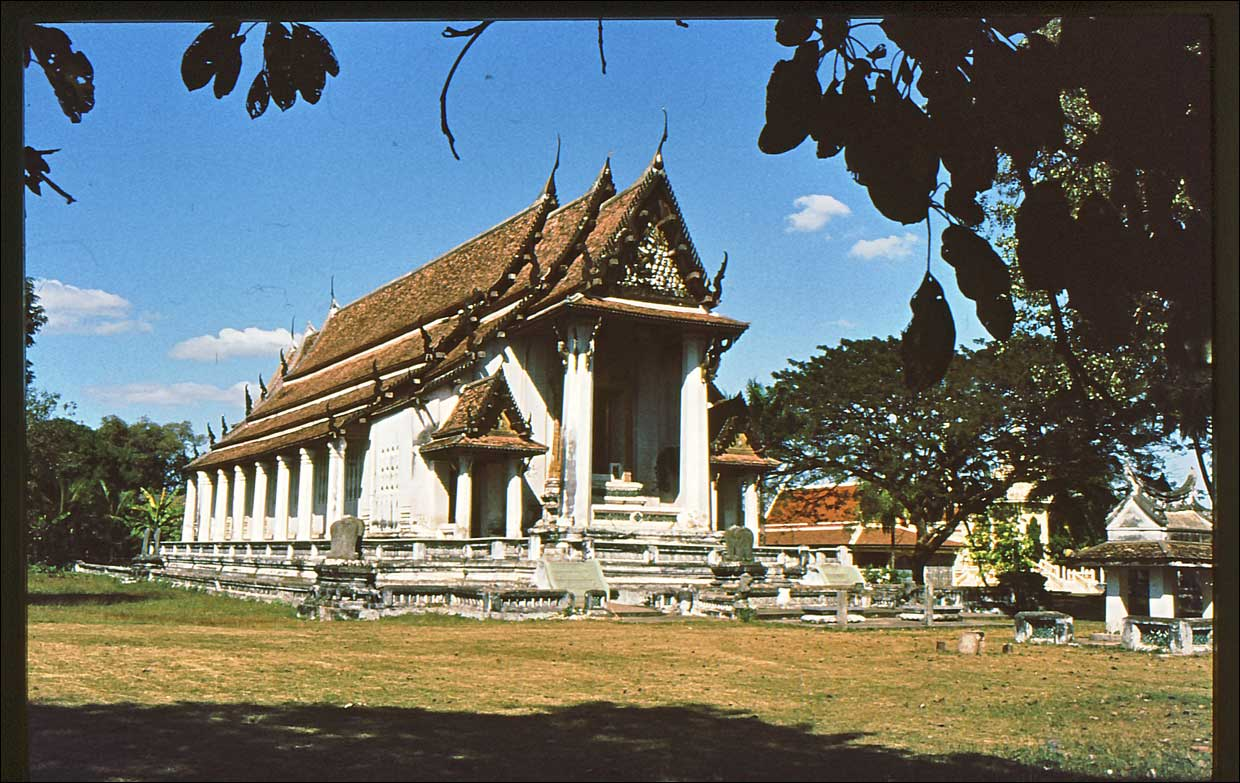
Ubosot of Wat Na Phra Men, photographed in July 1980

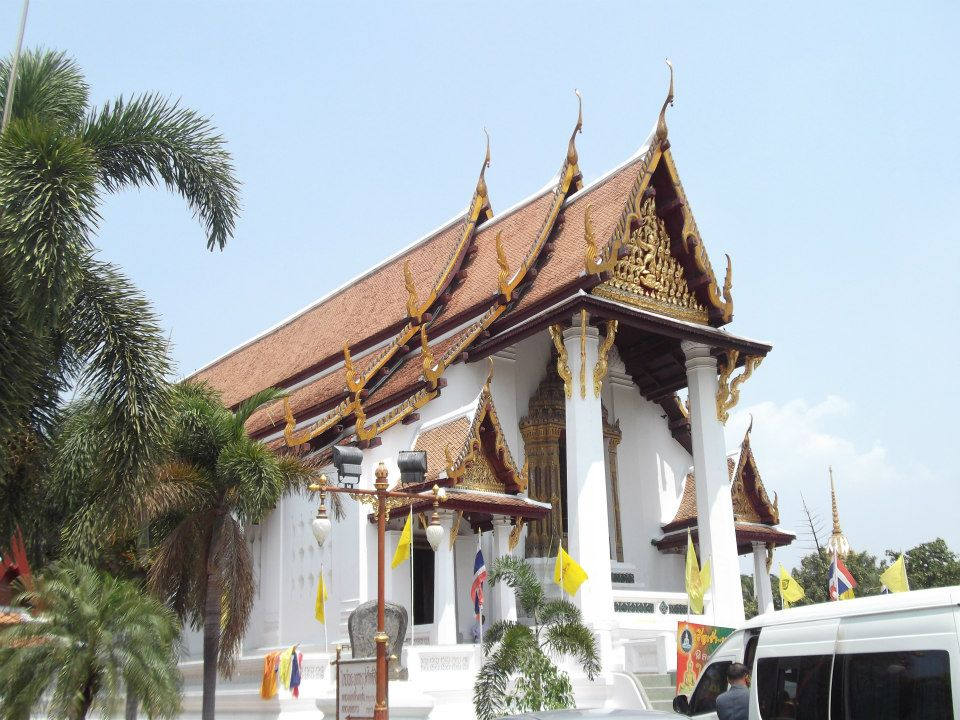
The temple

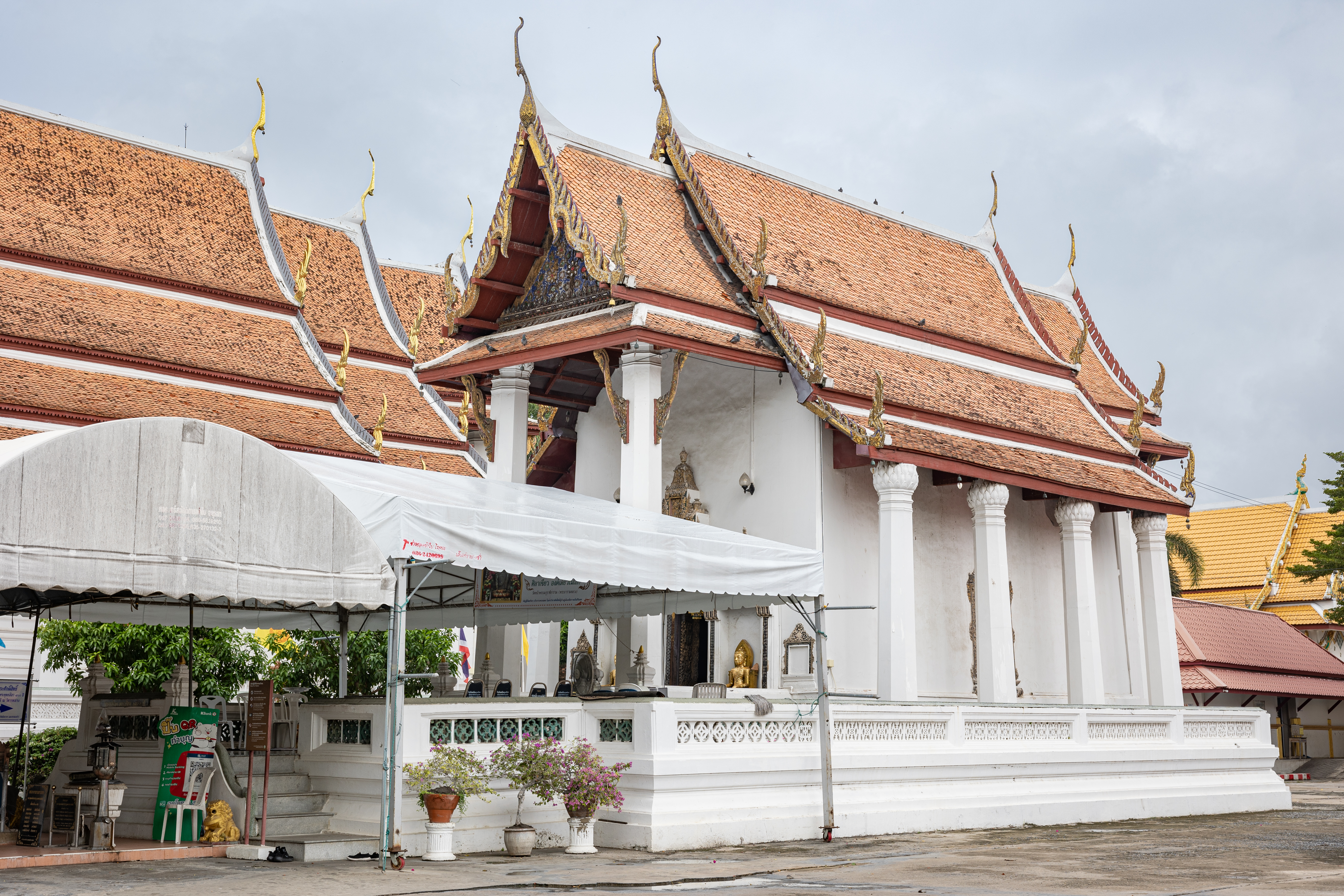
Viharn noi (chapel)

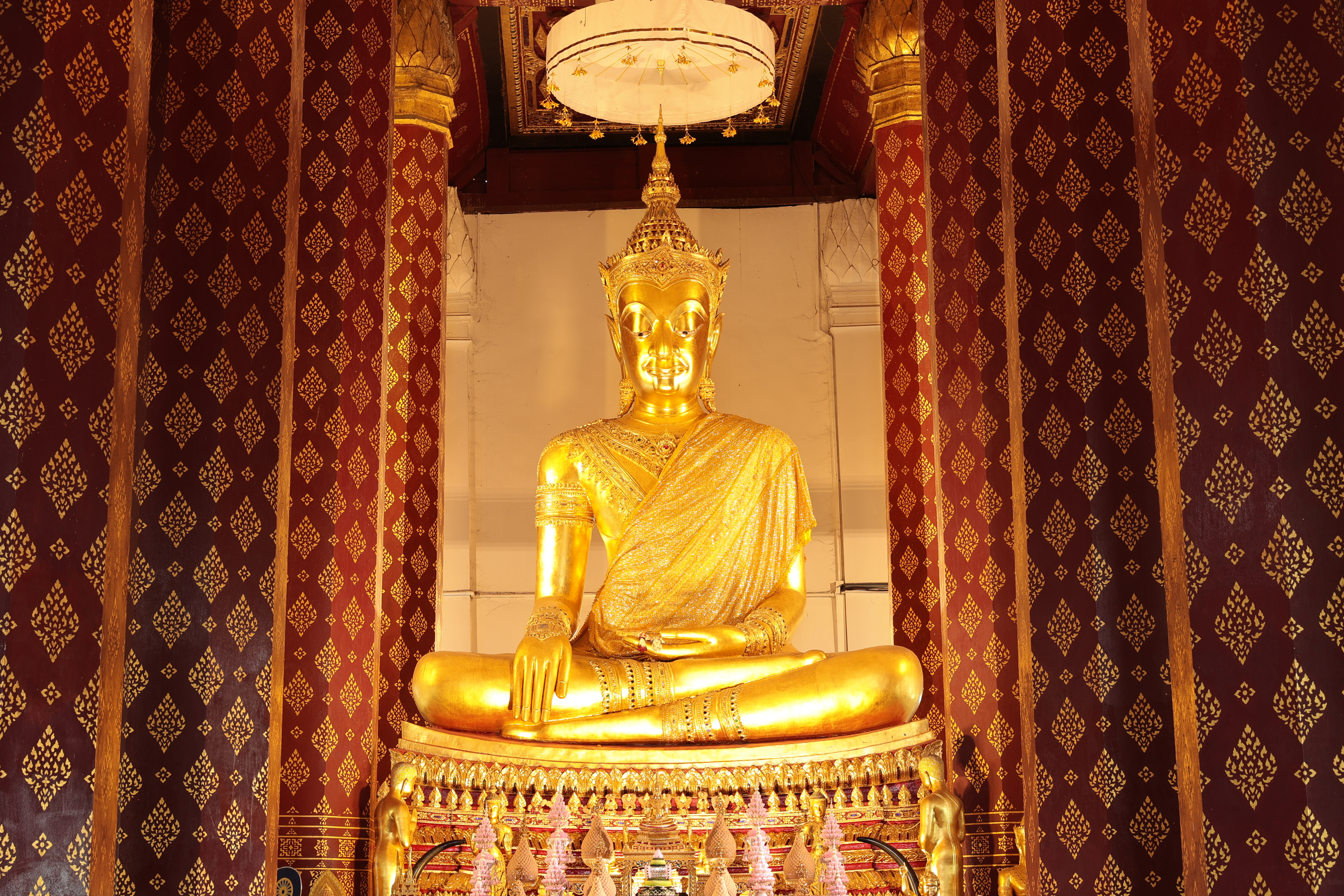
Phra Phuttha Nimit Wichit Mara Moli

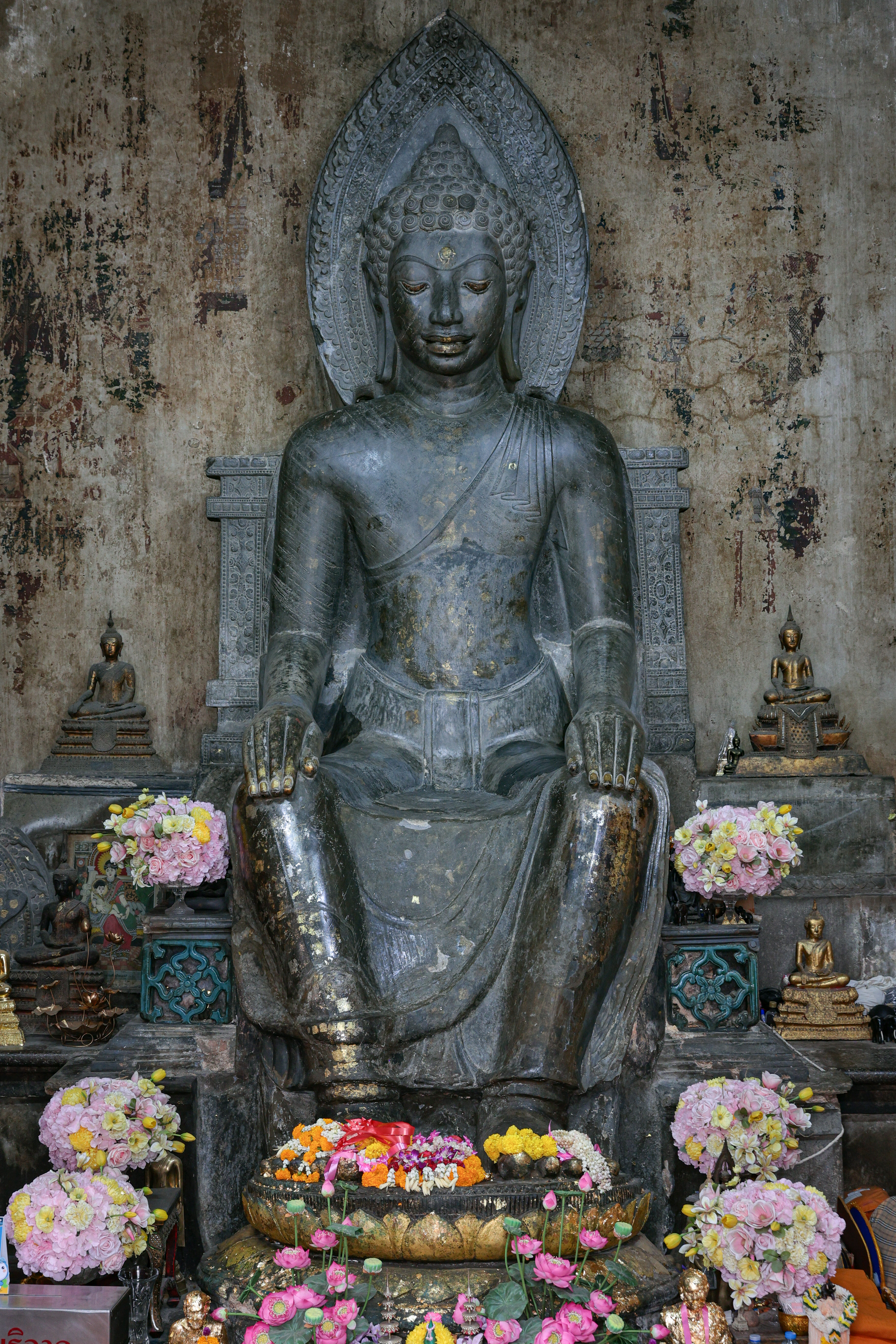
Phra Khanthararaj

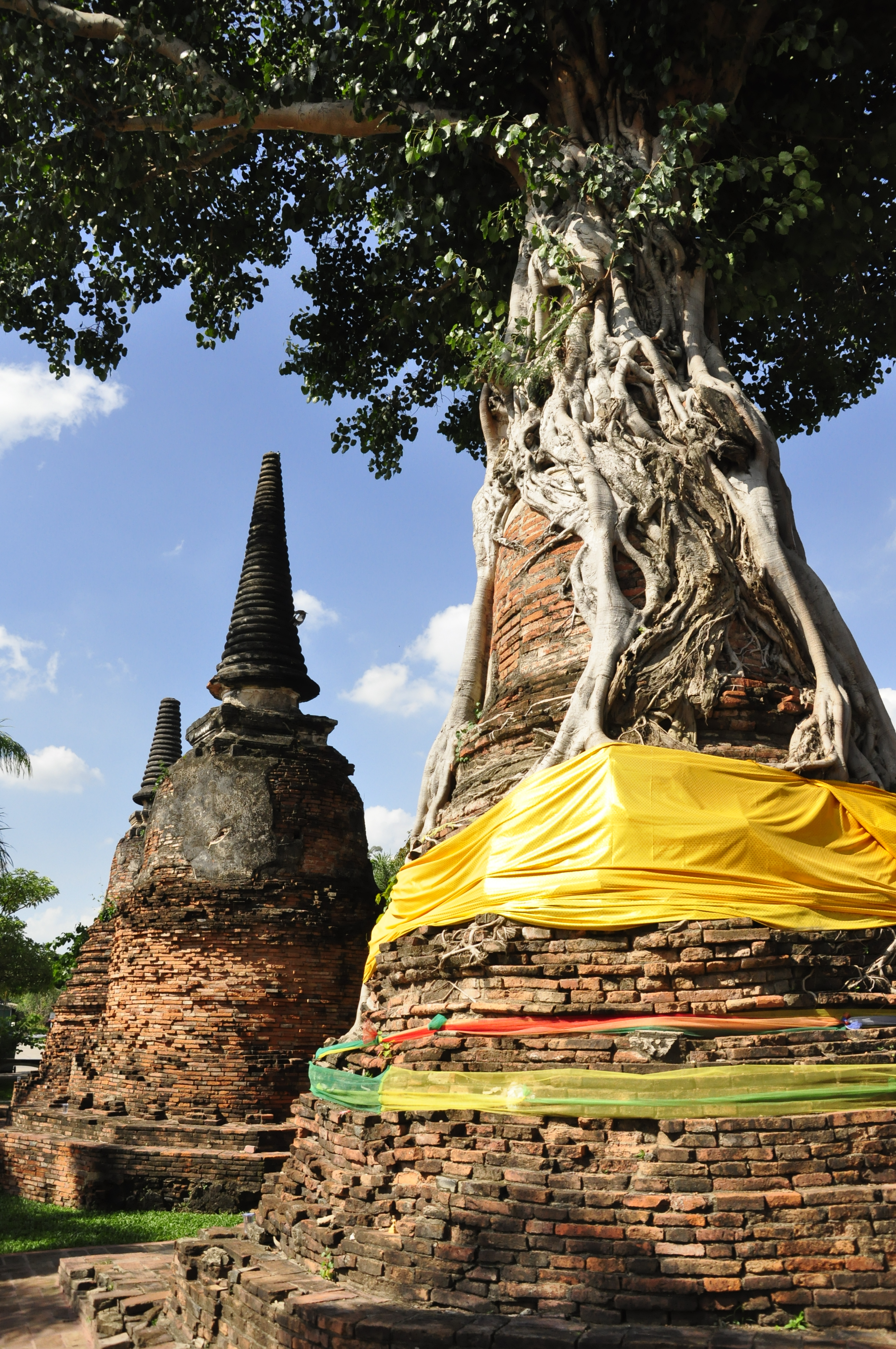
Ruined chedis

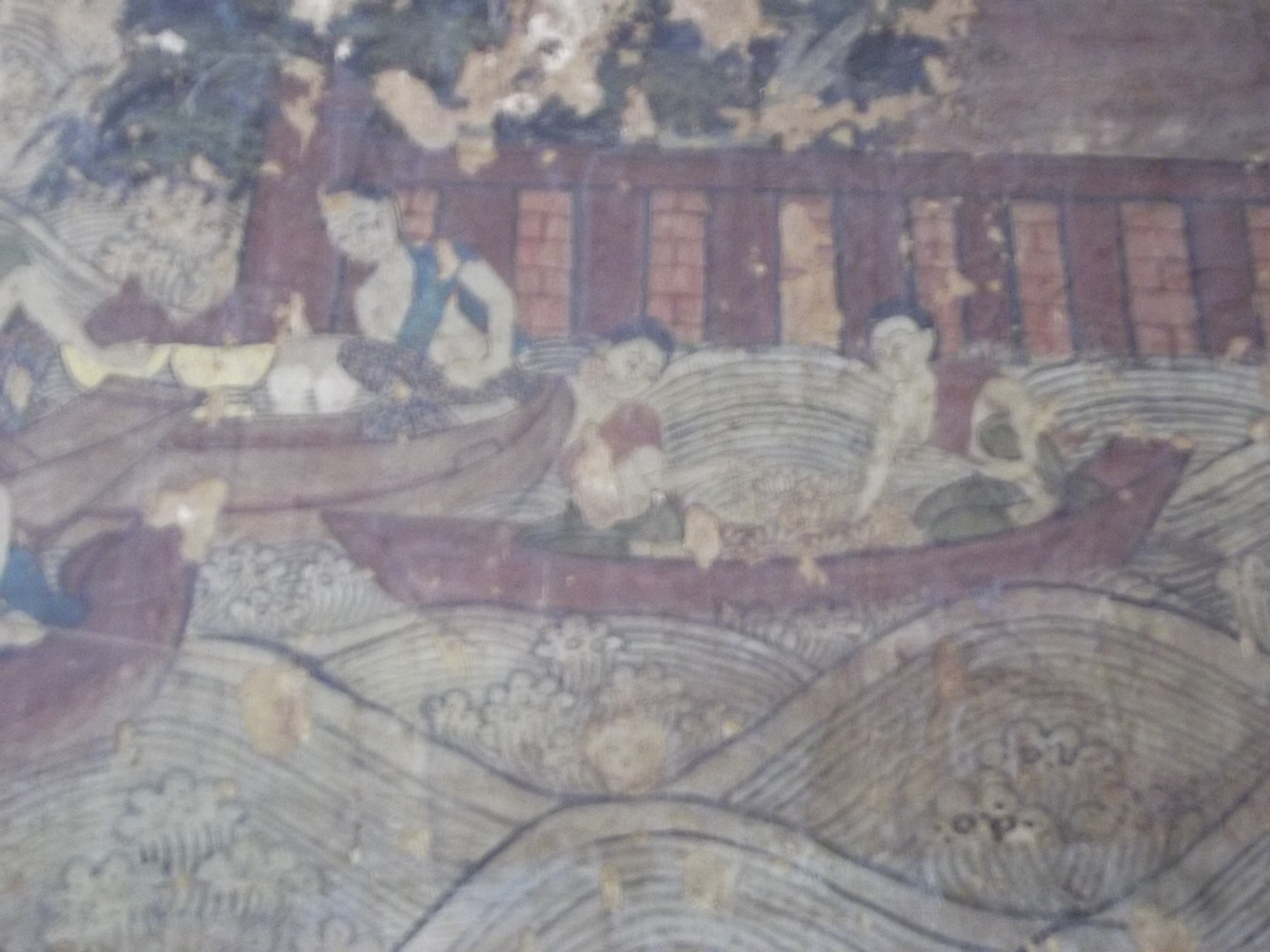
Mural painting

== See also ==
- Ayutthaya Historical Park
- Thai Buddhist sculpture
