= Wat Maheyong =

Coordinates: 14°21′49″N 100°35′42″E

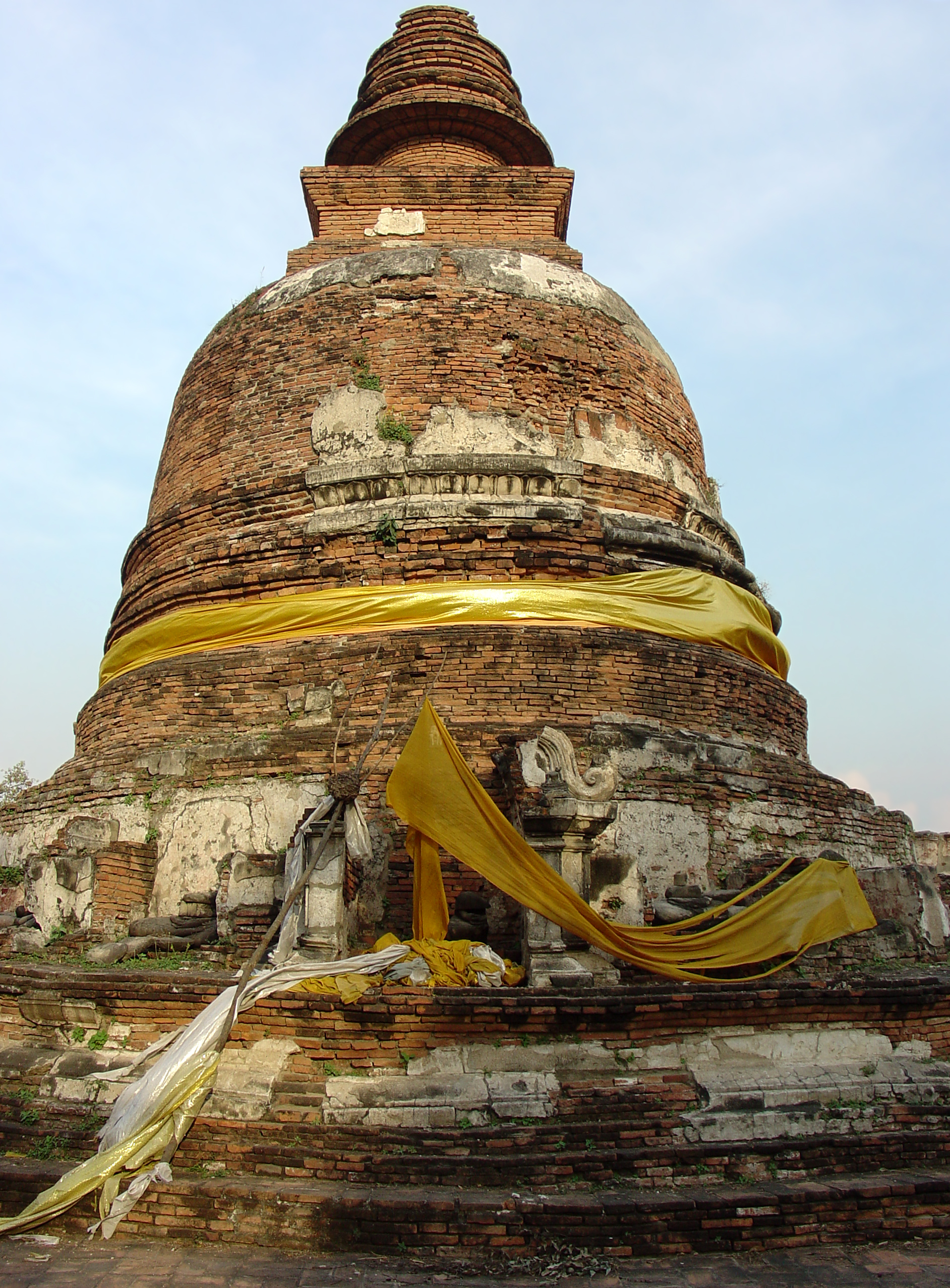
Principal Chedi of Wat Maheyong

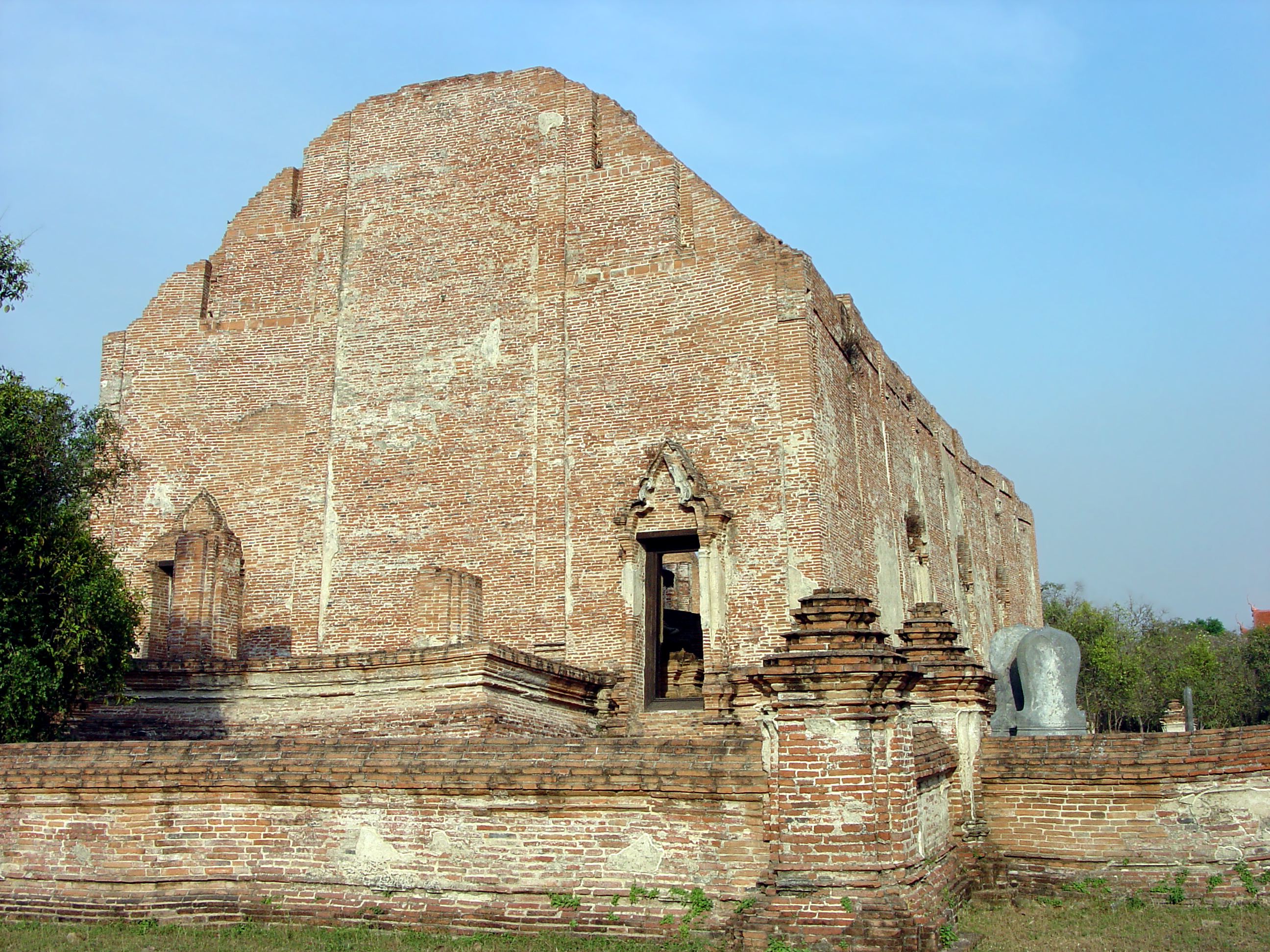
Ubosot (ordination hall) of Wat Maheyong

Wat Maheyong is a Buddhist temple in Phra Nakhon Si Ayutthaya district, Thailand. It was originally built in 1438, during the reign of King Borommarachathirat II, and restored in 1711 by King Thai Sa.

The major buildings in this temple are its chedi (stupa) and ubosot (ordination hall). The chedi's platform is supported by 80 sculpted elephants, and its ubosot is currently under worship.
