= Wat Senasanaram =

Buddhist temple in Thailand

Wat Senasanaram Ratchaworawihan
- วัดเสนาสนารามราชวรวิหาร

Religion
- Affiliation: Buddhist
- Sect: Theravāda
- Status: First-class royal temple

Location
- Location: Hua Ro, Phra Nakhon Si Ayutthaya
- Country: Thailand
- Interactive map of Wat Senasanaram Ratchaworawihan
- Coordinates: 14°21′48″N 100°34′25″E

Wat Senasanaram Ratchaworawihan (Thai: วัดเสนาสนารามราชวรวิหาร) is a first-class royal temple in Hua Ro, Phra Nakhon Si Ayutthaya, Thailand. Its monks belong to the Dhammayuttika Nikāya.
