= Chao Phrom Market =

Market in Thailand

Coordinates: 14.3591766875°N 100.578613835°E

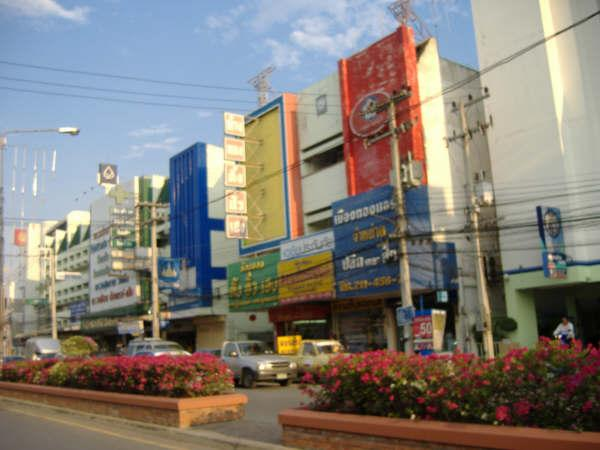
Chao Phrom Market

Chao Phrom Market (Thai: ตลาดเจ้าพรหม, pronounced [tā.làːt tɕâːw pʰrōm]) is a marketplace in Ayutthaya Island (Ayutthaya City), Phra Nakhon Si Ayutthaya province. Regarded as the Ayutthaya's main traditional market.

The market is located along Naresuan Road at the junction where Naresuan merges with U Thong Roads. This market offers food, clothing, amulet, Thai sweets, renown noodles shop, low prices on raw meat, seafood, agricultural product, gold shops, dental clinics, convenience stores, 7-Eleven, and department store, with banking service. There is even a pet shop.

The name of the market, called after the Phra Phrom (Lord Brahma in Thai representation) idol housed in the shrine along Naresuan Road. Typically, it is a morning market, the most active time is the dawn until late before noon. However, that stores and stalls may open and close at different times, so there is really no official opening or closing hours.

The market can be accessed from different sides. In addition, it is also regarded as the travel centre of Ayutthaya, the area near the market is a bus terminal that offers commuter buses from Ayutthaya to nearby towns, such as Suphanburi, Lopburi, Tha Ruea. The eastside of the market, is a ferry pier that serves passengers crossing the Pa Sak River from the train station to the Ayutthaya Island as well. The ferry pier opens at 5:30 am.

== Gallery ==
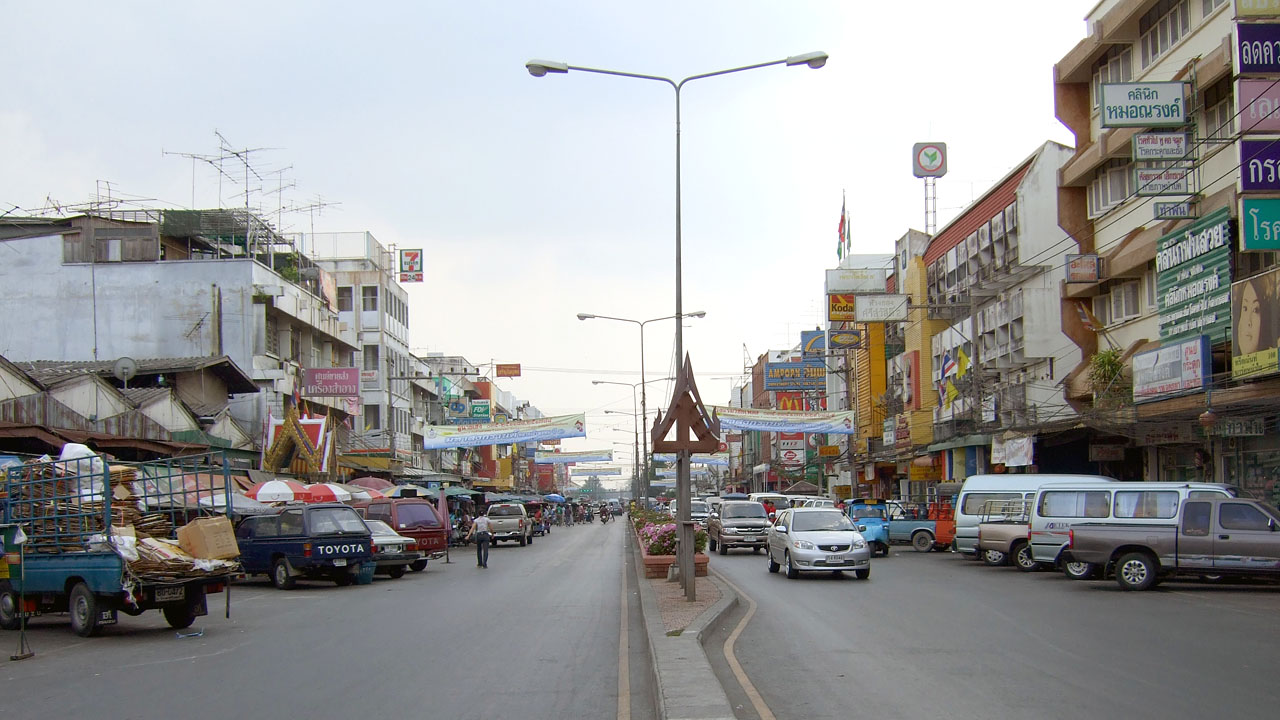
Naresuan Road in the area of the market

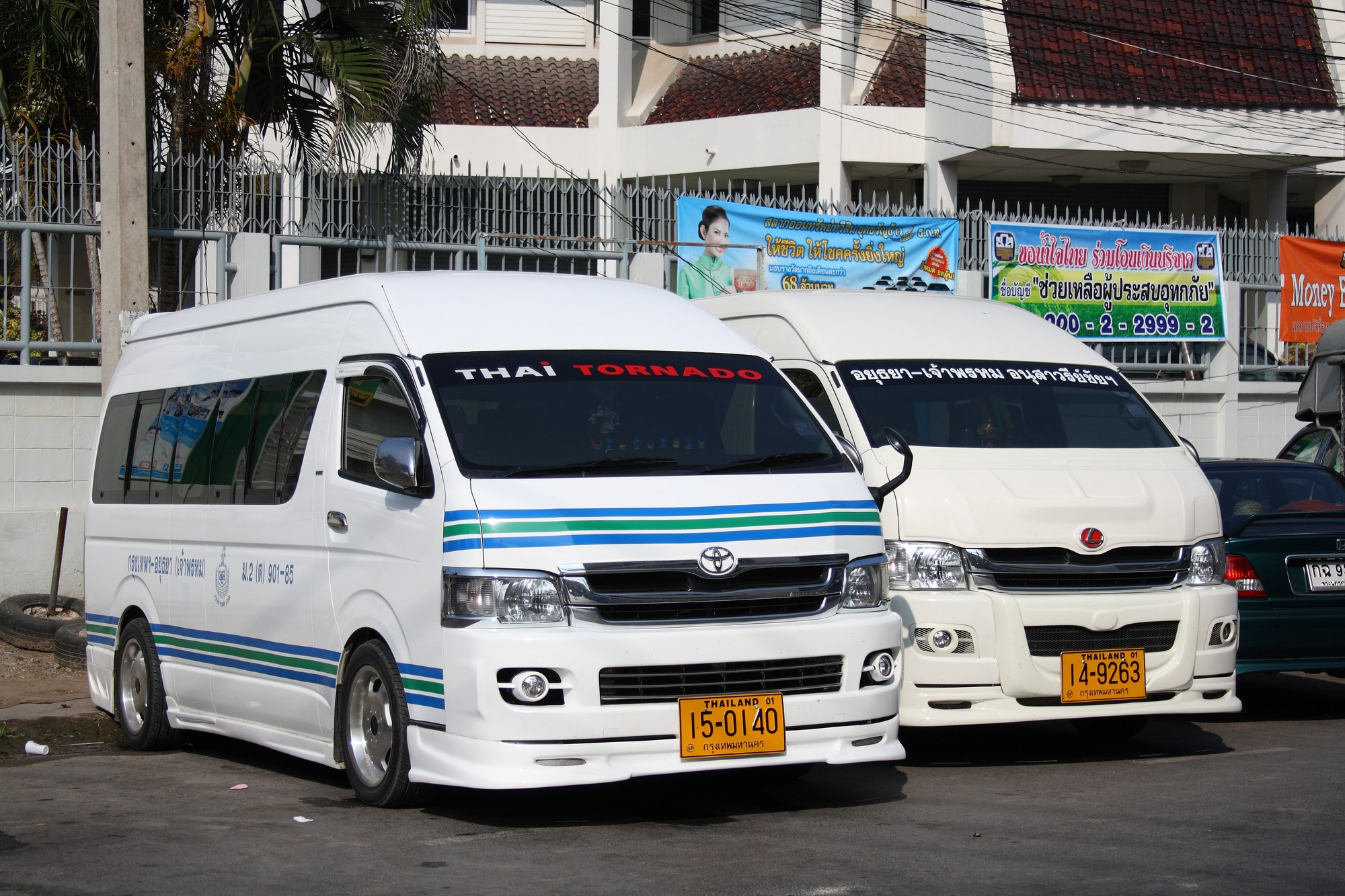
Minibuses at terminal near the market

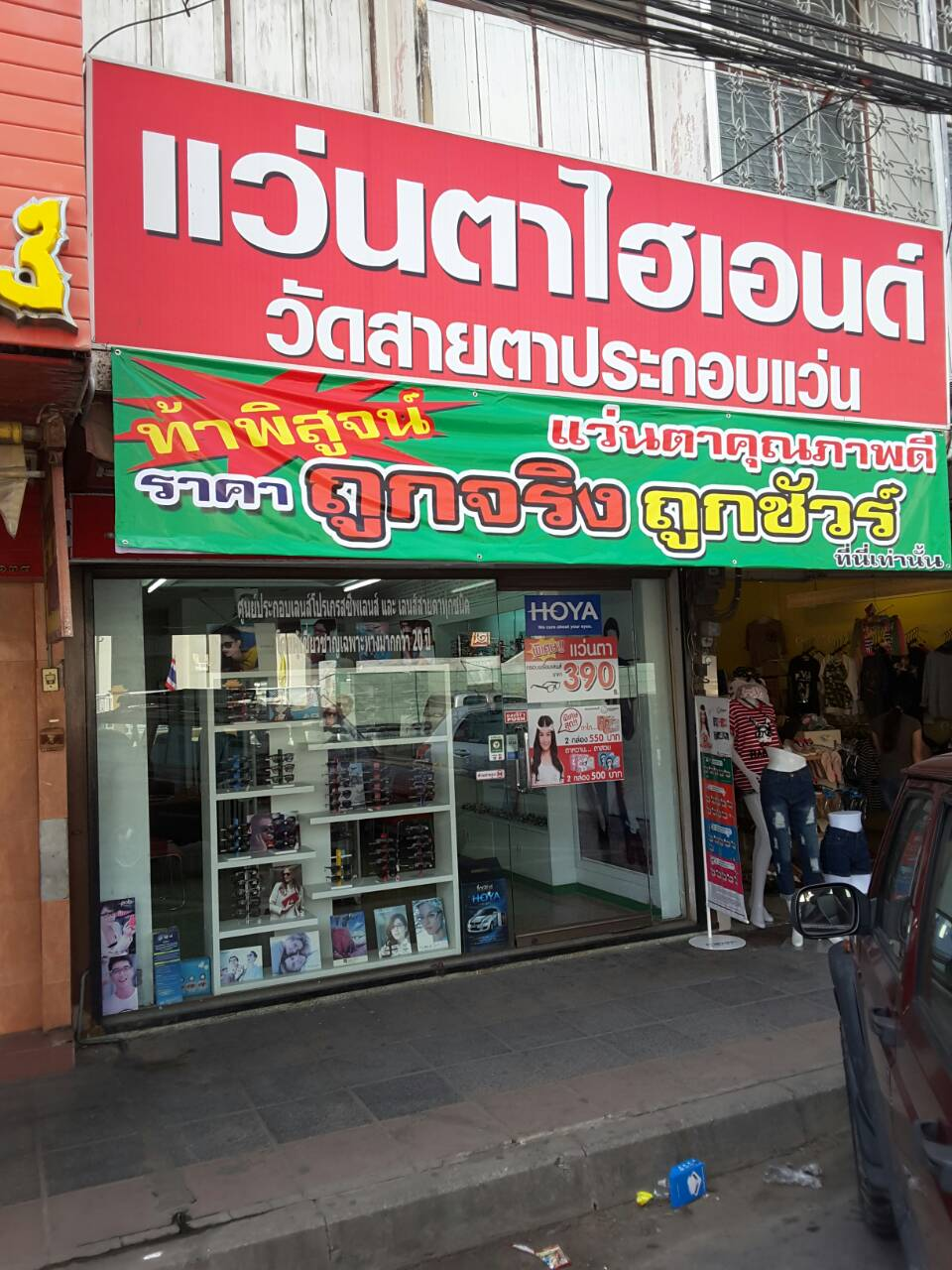
Eyeglasses shop at Chao Phrom Market

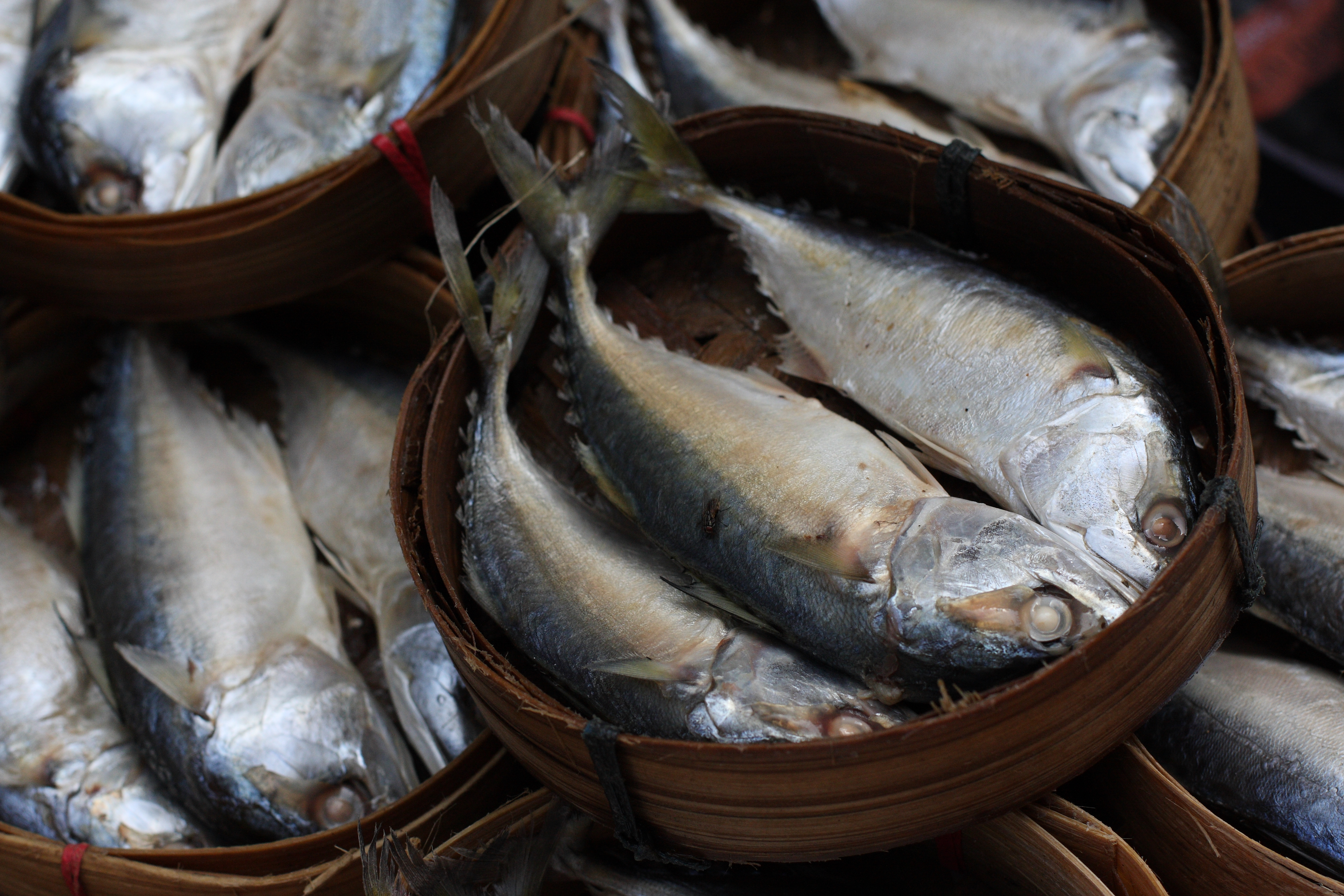
Steamed short mackerel for sale
