= Hua Ro, Phra Nakhon Si Ayutthaya =

Subdistrict in Ayutthaya province, Thailand

Coordinates: 14.365002°N 100.579166°E

Hua Ro (Thai: หัวรอ, pronounced [hǔa̯ rɔ̄ː]) is a tambon (sub-district) in Phra Nakhon Si Ayutthaya District, Phra Nakhon Si Ayutthaya Province.

== History ==
Hua Ro is considered a historic place. It has been inhabited for at least 200 years since Ayutthaya was the capital of Thailand. Its name "Hua Ro" is derived from the "Thamnop Ro" (ทำนบรอ, pronounced [tʰām.nóp rɔ̄ː]; literally translates as "the weir slows the flow of stream") located in its vicinity, a kind of weir made of wooden beams positioned in the water to break the speed of the river in order to prevent damage to the embankments. The water speed breaker was situated at the confluence of the former Lop Buri (now Chao Phraya River) and the front city moat in front of the former Maha Chai Fortress.

Historically, Wat Tha Sue (now the empty space behind Chan Kasem Palace) in the Hua Ro was where Viscount Rajseneha assassinated Viceroy Chan, the brother of Lord Worawongsathirat, the Ayutthaya King at the time. This was one of the plots to overthrow Worawongsathirat and Lady Sri Sudachan, led by Lord Pirenthorathep (later King Maha Thammaracha). This occurred in 1548.

In the fall of Ayutthaya in 1767, Hua Ro was one of the districts where the Burmese army invaded because it was the weakest defensive point. Maha Chai Fortress was burned along with city walls and various temples. Today, the fortress only remains hidden behind the market.

In modern times, Hua Ro is famous for its market, Hua Ro Market is a traditional market that retains its old-world charm like other traditional riverside communities. A long time ago, it burned down but has been restored almost completely. The market is currently administered by the Crown Property Bureau (CPB).

In terms of tourism, Hua Ro is also a place where tourists get on a boat to explore the Ayutthaya Island.

== Geography ==
Hua Ro is an area in the northeast corner of Ayutthaya Island. The Pa Sak River meanders from the north up till here and splits into two courses, they circled the area in the oxbow-shaped along with bisect Hua Ro into two parts and forming an isle.

Neighbouring subdistricts are (from the north clockwise) Suan Phrik, Hantra, Ho Rattanachai, Pratu Chai.

== Administration ==
The entire area is under the administration of Phra Nakhon Si Ayutthaya City Municipality.

== Neighbourhoods ==
- Chan Kasem Palace
- Wat Senasanaram
- Hua Ro Market
- Wat Mae Nang Plum
