= Ayothaya (town) =

Ayothaya อโยธยา
- Town
- เทศบาลเมืองอโยธยา
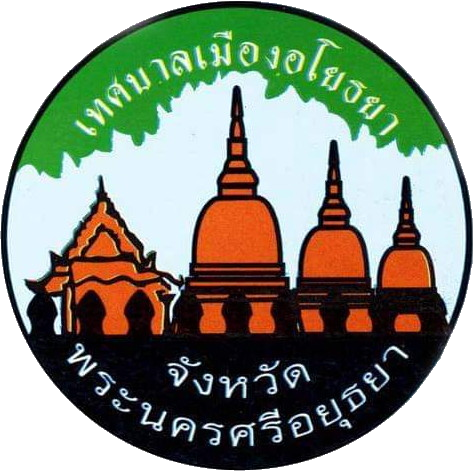
- Seal

- Location in Thailand
- Coordinates: 14.364091°N 100.588717°E
- Country: Thailand
- Region: Central Thailand
- Province: Phra Nakhon Si Ayutthaya
- District: Phra Nakhon Si Ayutthaya

Government
  - Mayor: Narong Danchaiwiroj

Area
  - Total: 8.4 km^{2} (3.2 sq mi)

Population
  - Total: 25,432
  - Density: 3,000/km^{2} (7,800/sq mi)
- Time zone: UTC+7 (ICT)
- Area code: (+66) 35
- Website: ayothaya.go.th

Ayothaya (Thai: อโยธยา, pronounced [ʔā.jōː.tʰā.jāː]), officially Thetsaban Mueang Ayothaya (Thai: เทศบาลเมืองอโยธยา), is a town in Phra Nakhon Si Ayutthaya district of Phra Nakhon Si Ayutthaya province. It is a town (thetsaban mueang) which covers part of the tambons Phai Ling, Hantra, and Khlong Suan Phlu.
