= Lumphli =

Lumphli ลุมพลี
- Subdistrict Administrative Organization
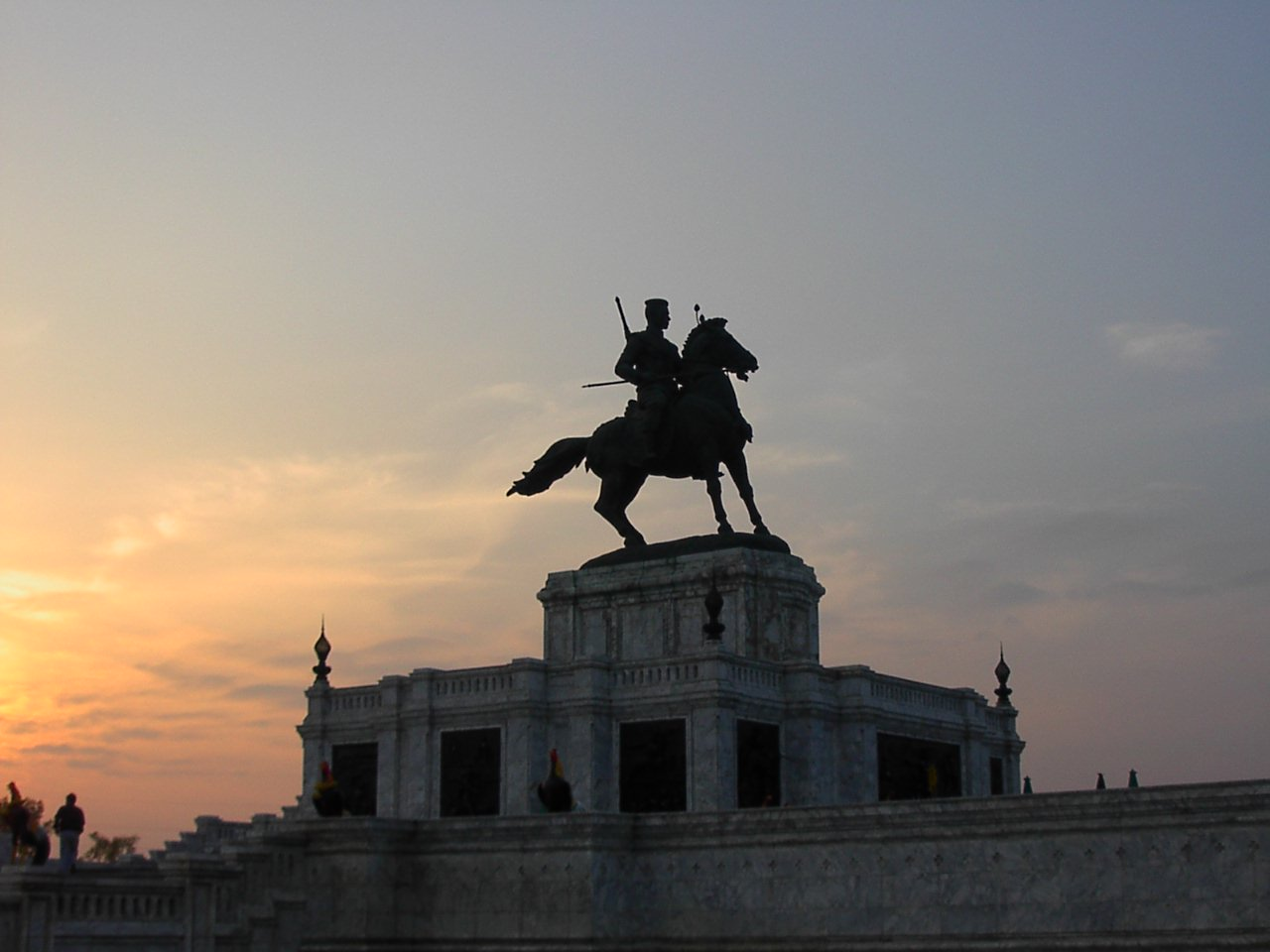
- King Naresuan the Great Monument, Thung Phukhao Thong, Lumphli
- Interactive map of Lumphli
- Coordinates: 14°22′12″N 100°33′00″E
- Country: Thailand
- Province: Phra Nakhon Si Ayutthaya
- District: Phra Nakhon Si Ayutthaya

Government
  - Mayor: Faisal Phlibat

Area
  - Total: 6.78 km^{2} (2.62 sq mi)

Population
  - Total: 5,641
  - Density: 832/km^{2} (2,150/sq mi)
- Time zone: UTC+7 (ICT)
- Postcode: 13000
- Area code: (+66) 02

Lumphli (Thai: ลุมพลี, pronounced [lūm.pʰlīː]) is a tambon (subdistrict) in Phra Nakhon Si Ayutthaya District, Phra Nakhon Si Ayutthaya Province.

== History ==
Lumphli (often colloquially known as "Thung Lumphli", means "Lumphli field") is a historic place. Its name has been mentioned to many times in Ayutthaya history. Lumphli was one of the 10 field plains of Ayutthaya. These fields were normally used as places for growing rice, and in each war they were converted into battlefields to defend against invaders.

In the first great war between Siamese and Burmese in 1548, Lumphli was used as a campsite for Tabinshwehti army. In this war, Suriyothai, queen of Ayutthaya, died in the single battle on elephant back with Thado Dhamma Yaza of Prome at Makham Yong field. A field plain borders on Phukhao Thong field and Lumphli field. These field complex, bounded by Phukhao Thong Reservoir and Highway 347 (Pathum Thani–Bang Pahan Route) in currently.

In the second war between Siamese and Burmese in 1563–1564, the forces of Bassein (Pathein in present-day) governor occupied Lumphli as an army base.

Later, in the early Rattanakosin period, Lumphli was also home to Muslim prisoners of war who were herded from Mergui (Myeik in present-day) in the south of the country.

== Geography ==
The terrain of Lumphli is a lowland with Khlong Bang Khuad and Khlong Song Phai flowing through the area. Lumphli is the area with as northern border the southern stretch of the loop in the Lopburi River; on the east a stretch of the Lopburi River up till the confluence with Khlong Sa Bua; on the south, Thung Khwan and on the west, Khlong Maha Nak.

The subdistricts adjacent to Lumphli include (from the north clockwise): Wat Tum, Suan Phrik, Khlong Sa Bua, and Phukhao Thong. All of them are in Phra Nakhon Si Ayutthaya District.

Lumphli is about 8 km (5.0 mi) northwest of downtown Ayutthaya and about 10 km (6.2 mi) from Phra Nakhon Si Ayutthaya Provincial Hall.

== Administration ==
=== Central administration ===
The entire area of Lumphli is under the administration of Subdistrict Administrative Organization (SAO) Lumphli.

=== Local administration ===
It was also divided into six muban (village)

No.	Name	Thai
1.	Ban Ko Lang	บ้านเกาะล่าง
2.	Ban Yan Sue	บ้านย่านซื่อ
3.	Ban Ko Klang	บ้านเกาะกลาง
4.	Ban Lang Surao	บ้านหลังสุเหร่า
5.	Ban Hua Thanon	บ้านหัวถนน
6.	Ban Nong Prathun	บ้านหนองประทุน

== Population ==
The population often set up their houses along the canals and roadsides, highways and village roads. Most of the houses are set up next to each other in a long length.

98 percent of the population in the area are Muslims.

== Places ==
King Naresuan the Great Monument and Phukhao Thong Reservoir are in the area.

There are many ancient temples in the area and vicinity including Wat Bua (mound), Wat Dokmai (vanished), Wat Jong Krom (restored ruin), Wat Phraya Maen (restored ruin), Wat Prasat (ruin), Wat Si Liam (restored ruin), Wat Tha Khlong (active monastery) and Wat Tum (active monastery).
