= Uthai district =

Uthai อุทัย
- District
- District location in Ayutthaya province
- Coordinates: 14°21′43″N 100°40′13″E
- Country: Thailand
- Province: Ayutthaya
- Seat: Uthai
- Muban: 107

Area
  - Total: 186.8 km^{2} (72.1 sq mi)

Population (2000)
  - Total: 39,943
  - Density: 213.8/km^{2} (554/sq mi)
- Time zone: UTC+7 (ICT)
- Postal code: 13210
- Geocode: 1414

Uthai (Thai: อุทัย, pronounced [ʔùʔ.tʰāj]) is a district (amphoe) in the eastern part of Ayutthaya province, in Thailand.

== History ==
The district was originally named Uthai Yai, but was renamed Uthai in 1916.

Before the Ayutthaya kingdom was conquered by Burmese troops in 1767, Phraya Wachira Prakan (the later king Taksin) led his small group of soldiers against the Burmese troops to the east. He passed the Burmese troops and arrived at the territory in the morning. Then he named this area Uthai, which mean 'risen sun'.

== Geography ==
Neighboring districts are (from the north clockwise) Nakhon Luang and Phachi of Ayutthaya Province; Nong Khae of Saraburi province; Wang Noi, Bang Pa-in, and Phra Nakhon Si Ayutthaya of Ayutthaya.

== Administration ==
The district is divided into 11 sub-districts tambon, which are further subdivided into 107 villages muban. Uthai is a township (thesaban tambon) covering parts of the tambon Uthai.

No.	Name	Thai	Villages
1.	Khan Ham	คานหาม	9
2.	Ban Chang	บ้านช้าง	7
3.	Sam Bandit	สามบัณฑิต	10
4.	Ban Hip	บ้านหีบ	12
5.	Nong Mai Sung	หนองไม้ซุง	9
6.	Uthai	อุทัย	13
7.	Sena	เสนา	6
8.	Nong Nam Som	หนองน้ำส้ม	7
9.	Pho Sao Han	โพสาวหาญ	8
10.	Thanu	ธนู	12
11.	Khao Mao	ข้าวเม่า	14
