= Phra Nakhon Si Ayutthaya district =

Phra Nakhon Si Ayutthaya พระนครศรีอยุธยา
- District
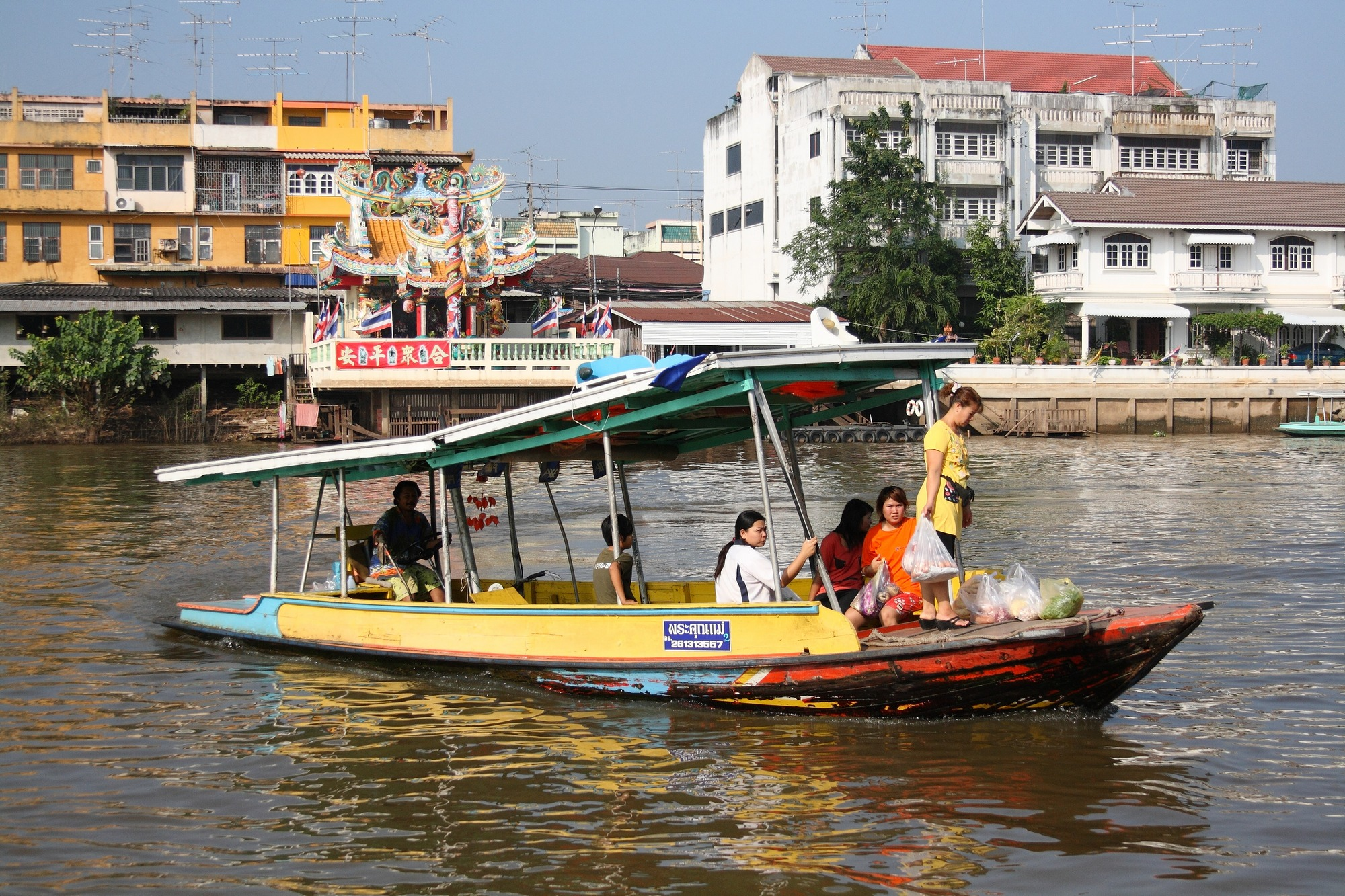
- Ferry across Pa Sak River from Chao Phrom Market to Ayutthaya railway station (inside Ayutthaya Island to outside Ayutthaya Island)

- District location in Phra Nakhon Si Ayutthaya province
- Coordinates: 14°21′8″N 100°34′36″E
- Country: Thailand
- Province: Phra Nakhon Si Ayutthaya
- Seat: Ho Rattanachai

Area
  - Total: 130.6 km^{2} (50.4 sq mi)

Population (5 December 1998)
  - Total: 136,467
  - Density: 1,053.13/km^{2} (2,727.6/sq mi)
- Time zone: UTC+7 (ICT)
- ZIP code: 13000
- Geocode: 1401

Phra Nakhon Si Ayutthaya (Thai: พระนครศรีอยุธยา, pronounced [pʰráʔ ná(ʔ).kʰɔ̄ːn sǐː ʔā.jút.tʰā.jāː]) is the capital district (amphoe Mueang) of Phra Nakhon Si Ayutthaya province, central Thailand. Its former name as the capital city of Ayutthaya Kingdom was "Krungthep Thawarawadi Si Ayutthaya" (Thai: กรุงเทพทวารวดีศรีอยุธยา).

== History ==
According to George Coedes, tradition states Ramathibodi I founded Dvaravati Sri Ayudhya in 1350.

Created in 1897, the district was originally called Rop Krung (รอบกรุง). The district name was changed to Krung Kao (กรุงเก่า) in 1917. In 1957 the name was changed to Phra Nakhon Si Ayutthaya. to commemorate the old capital city of the Ayutthaya Kingdom. This makes it unique among Thailand's capital districts, the rest of which are named amphoe mueang followed by the name of province.

== Geography ==
Neighboring districts are (from the north clockwise) Bang Pahan, Nakhon Luang, Uthai, Bang Pa-in, Bang Sai and Bang Ban.

== Administration ==
The district is divided into 21 sub-districts (tambon). In addition to the city (thesaban nakhon) of Ayutthaya there are other municipal areas. Ayothaya is a town (thesaban mueang) which covers part of the tambons Phai Ling, Hantra, and Khlong Suan Phlu.

No.	Name	Thai	Pop.
1.	Pratu Chai	ประตูชัย	16,155
2.	Kamang	กะมัง	1,458
3.	Ho Rattanachai	หอรัตนไชย	11,671
4.	Hua Ro	หัวรอ	12,427
5.	Tha Wasukri	ท่าวาสุกรี	8,756
6.	Phai Ling	ไผ่ลิง	15,232
7.	Pak Kran	ปากกราน	5,526
8.	Phukhao Thong	ภูเขาทอง	2,748
9.	Samphao Lom	สำเภาล่ม	6,368
10.	Suan Phrik	สวนพริก	3,941
11.	Khlong Takhian	คลองตะเคียน	4,798
12.	Wat Tum	วัดตูม	4,219
13.	Hantra	หันตรา	7,261
14.	Lumphli	ลุมพลี	5,083
15.	Ban Mai	บ้านใหม่	4,415
16.	Ban Ko	บ้านเกาะ	4,892
17.	Khlong Suan Phlu	คลองสวนพลู	6,605
18.	Khlong Sa Bua	คลองสระบัว	4,380
19.	Ko Rian	เกาะเรียน	2,619
20.	Ban Pom	บ้านป้อม	6,504
21.	Ban Run	บ้านรุน	1,409
