= Kamang, Thailand =

Subdistrict in Thailand

Coordinates: 14.344956°N 100.576563°E

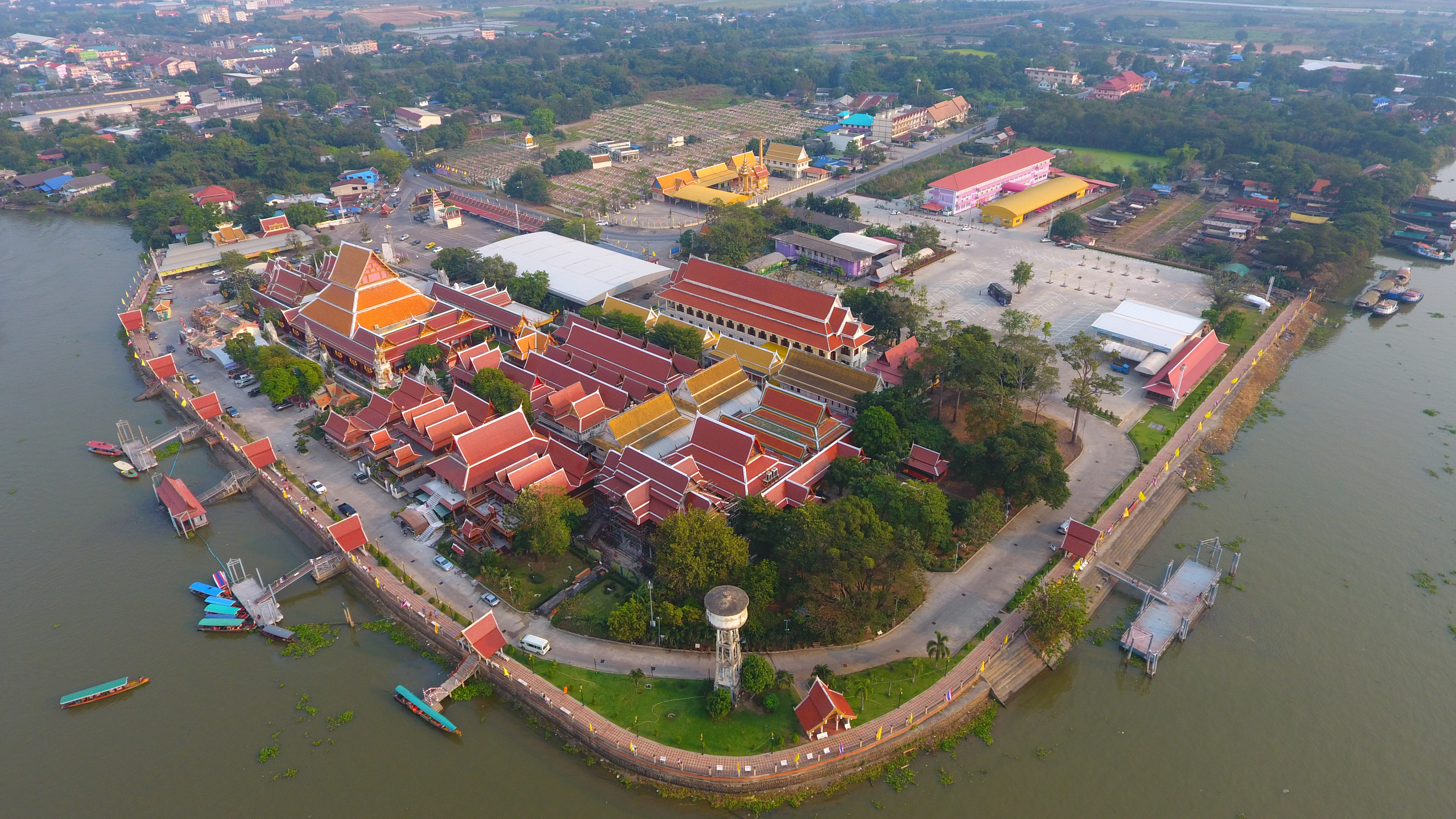
Bird's-eye view of Wat Phanan Choeng

Kamang (Thai: กะมัง, pronounced [kā.māŋ]) is a tambon (subdistrict) in Phra Nakhon Si Ayutthaya District, Phra Nakhon Si Ayutthaya Province, Thailand.

== Naming ==
Kamang is named after a small khlong (canal) Kamang, (also known as Phai Ling) runs through the north part of the area. Kamang (sometimes spelled Kramang) literally translates as 'Smith's barb', an edible freshwater fish in the carp family.

== Geography ==
It can be considered as the outer area of Ayutthaya Island. Neighbouring subdistricts are (from the north clockwise) Hua Ro, Phai Ling, Khlong Suan Phlu, Samphao Lom. In the west it borders the Pa Sak River.

The area is located at the foot of the Pridi-Thamrong Bridge (outbound).

== Administration ==
The entire area is under the administration of Phra Nakhon Si Ayutthaya City Municipality.

== Places ==
Waterfront hotels in the area include Krungsri River Hotel, Ayothaya Riverside Hotel, and Woraburi Ayutthaya Resort & Spa.

The most prominent temple is Wat Phanan Choeng.
