= Khlong Suan Phlu subdistrict =

Tambon in Phra Nakhon Si Ayutthaya, Thailand

Khlong Suan Phlu คลองสวนพลู
- Tambon
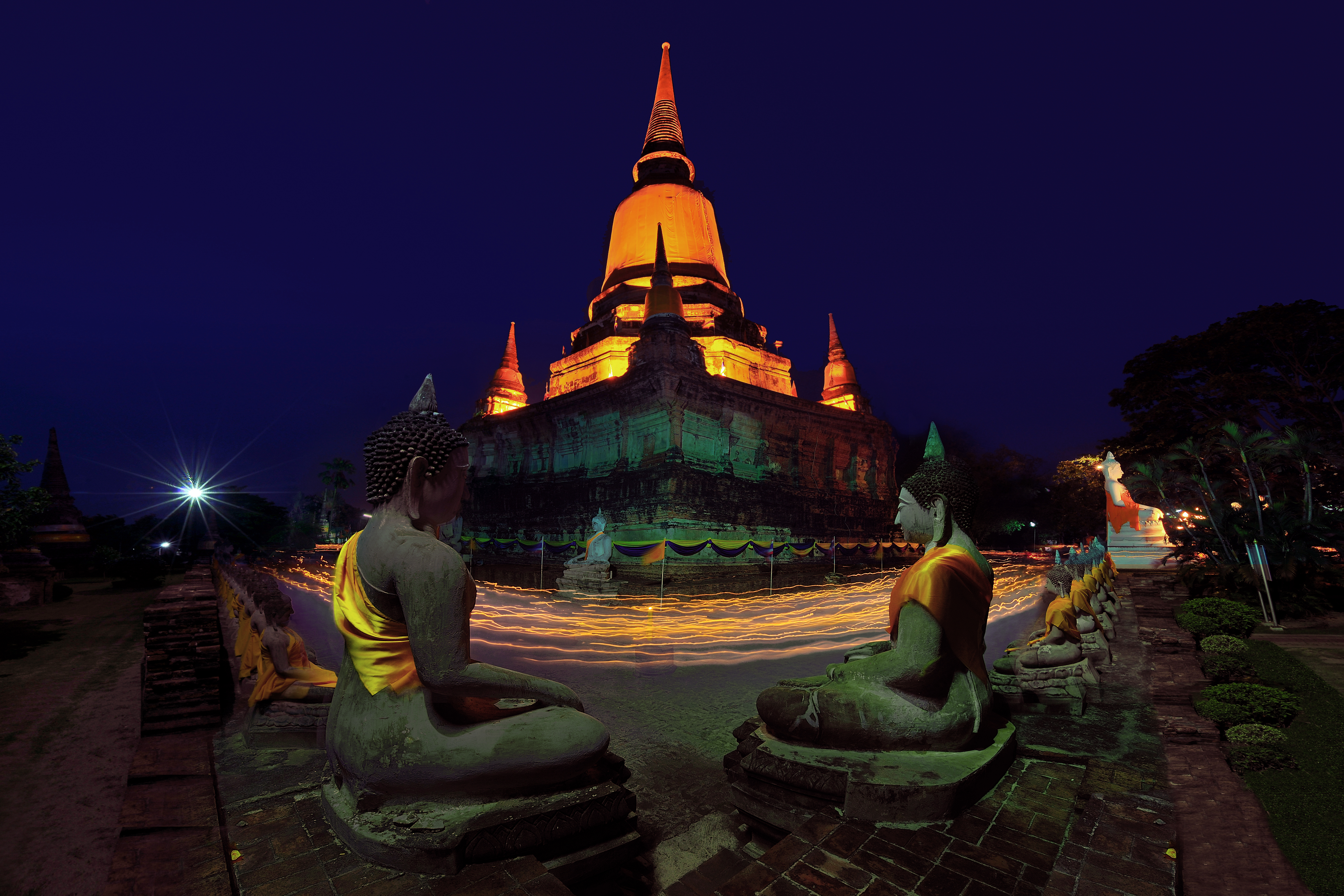
- Wat Yai Chai Mongkhon by night
- Interactive map of Khlong Suan Phlu
- Country: Thailand
- Province: Phra Nakhon Si Ayutthaya
- Amphoe: Phra Nakhon Si Ayutthaya

Area
  - Total: 6.68 km^{2} (2.58 sq mi)

Population (1998)
  - Total: 6,605
- Time zone: UTC+7 (ICT)
- Postcode: 13000
- Area code: (+66) 02

Khlong Suan Phlu (Thai: คลองสวนพลู, pronounced [kʰlɔ̄ːŋ sǔa̯n pʰlūː]) is a tambon (subdistrict) in Phra Nakhon Si Ayutthaya District, Phra Nakhon Si Ayutthaya province, Thailand.

== History & toponymy ==
Its name "Khlong Suan Phlu" (literally means "betel plantation canal"), called after a khlong (canal) in the same name that crosses in the northwest part of the area. Khlong Suan Phlu is the old course of the Pa Sak River that begins at Hua Ro, and then turned towards the Hantra River and then pass Wat Phanan Choeng, where it is referred to as the "Khlong Suan Phlu". It is a waterway connects the Pa Sak and the Chao Phraya Rivers.

In the Ayutthaya period, a large number of waterways and ditches were dug. Khlong Suan Phlu (otherwise known as Khlong Phai Ling or Nam Mae Bia) was one of them. Historically, Khlong Suan Phlu area was a large Chinese community. One of Khlong Suan Phlu folk that were born and raised here was King Taksin. The Chao Phraya River near the canal mouth, it was the location of the houseboats of the Chinese immigrants. This area was believed to be another mooring point for Chinese junk in the heart of Ayutthaya. Nowadays, the only surviving evidence that it used to be a Chinatown is a Chinese waterfront shrine that is more than 600 years old.

== Geography ==
Khlong Suan Phlu covers 6.68 square kilometers (2.58 sq mi). The area is a suburb Ayutthaya and quasi-rural.

Its terrain is a floodplain, therefore suitable for farming.

It is bordered by Kamang and Phai Ling Subdistricts in its district to the north, Khan Ham Subdistrict in Uthai District to the east, Ko Rian Subdistrict in its district and Ban Krot Subdistrict in Bang Pa-in District to the south, and Ko Rian Subdistrict in its district to the west.

== Administration ==
Khlong Suan Phlu is administered by two local government bodies: Phra Nakhon Si Ayutthaya City Municipality and Ayothaya Town Municipality.

It is also subdivided into three muban (village)

| No. | Name | Thai |
|---|---|---|
| 1. | Ban Rong Wari | บ้านโรงวารี |
| 2. | Ban Khlong Khaosan | บ้านคลองข้าวสาร |
| 3. | Ban Khlong Thanon Tan | บ้านคลองถนนตาล |
| 4. | Ban Tang Mai | บ้านตั้งใหม่ |

== Economy ==
Khlong Suan Phlu is famous for hotels and resorts offer spa and Thai massage services for guests or the general public.

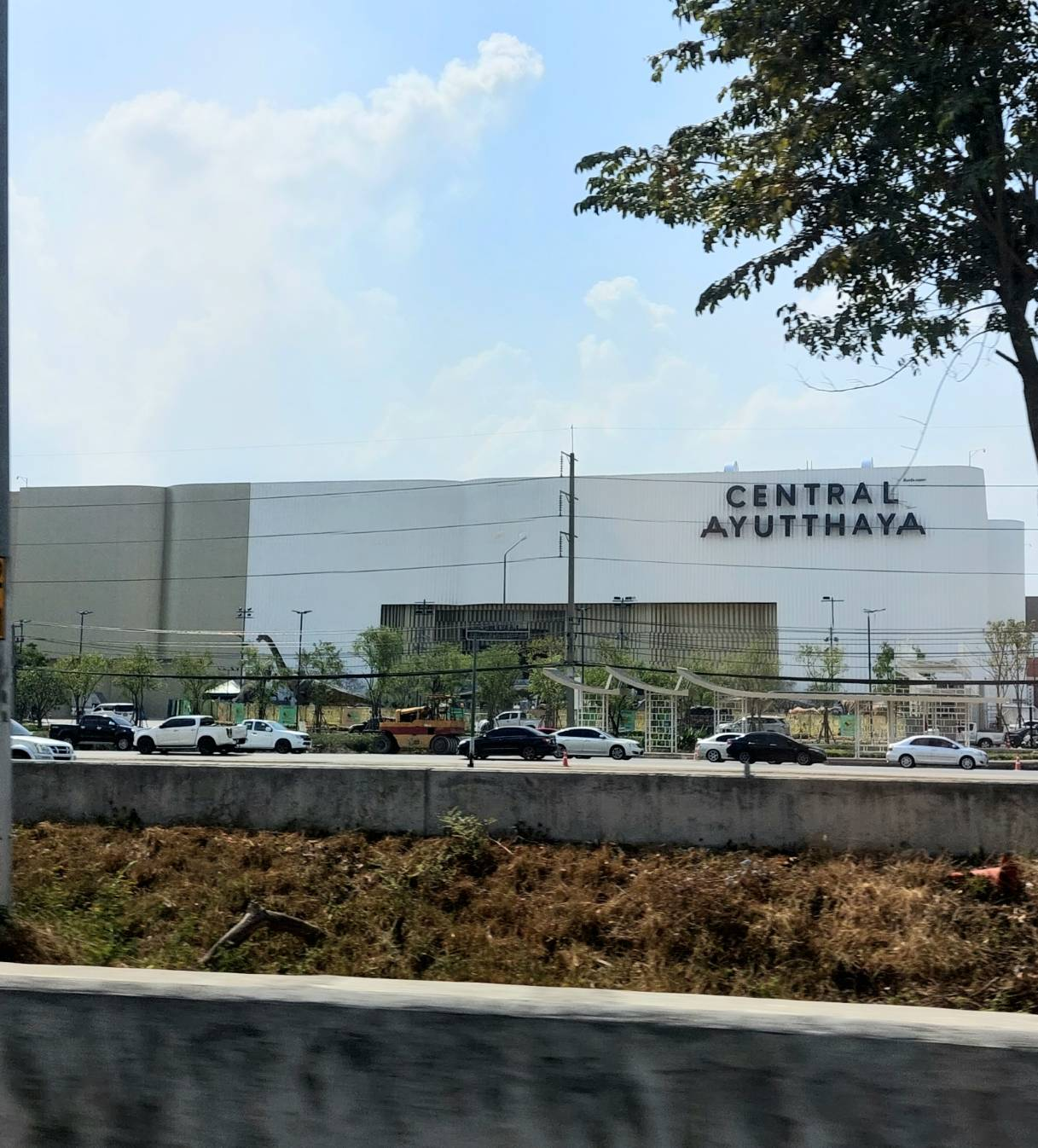
Central Ayutthaya

== Places of interest ==
=== Place of worship ===
- Wat Yai Chai Mongkhon (Note: Wat Phanan Choeng, in most information often indicates located in Khlong Suan Phlu, indeed, it is in the neighbouring Kamang.)

=== Shopping malls ===
- Central Ayutthaya
- Ayutthaya City Park

== Transportation ==
- Highway 32 (often colloquially known as Asian Highway) is a main thoroughfare.

== Products ==
- Roti sai mai
- Artificial flowers
- Wood carving product
