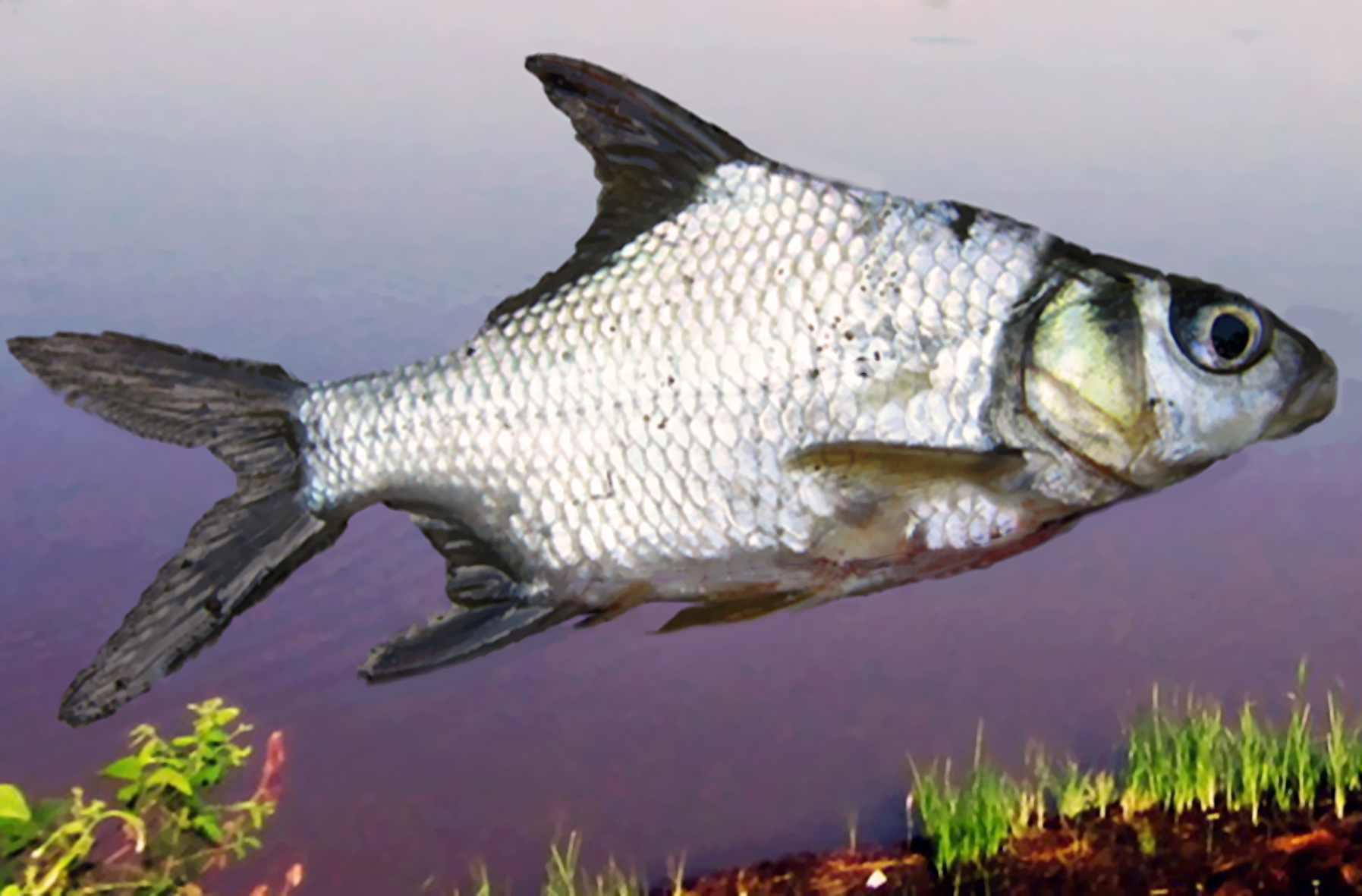

Conservation status
- Least Concern (IUCN 3.1)

Scientific classification
- Kingdom: Animalia
- Phylum: Chordata
- Class: Actinopterygii
- Order: Cypriniformes
- Family: Cyprinidae
- Genus: Puntioplites
- Species: P. falcifer

Binomial name
- Puntioplites falcifer H. M. Smith, 1929

= Puntioplites falcifer =

Species of fish

Puntioplites falcifer is a species of ray-finned fish in the genus Puntioplites which is endemic to the Mekong basin in Thailand, Laos, Cambodia and Vietnam.

== Footnotes ==
- Froese, Rainer; Pauly, Daniel (eds.). "Puntioplites falcifer". FishBase.
