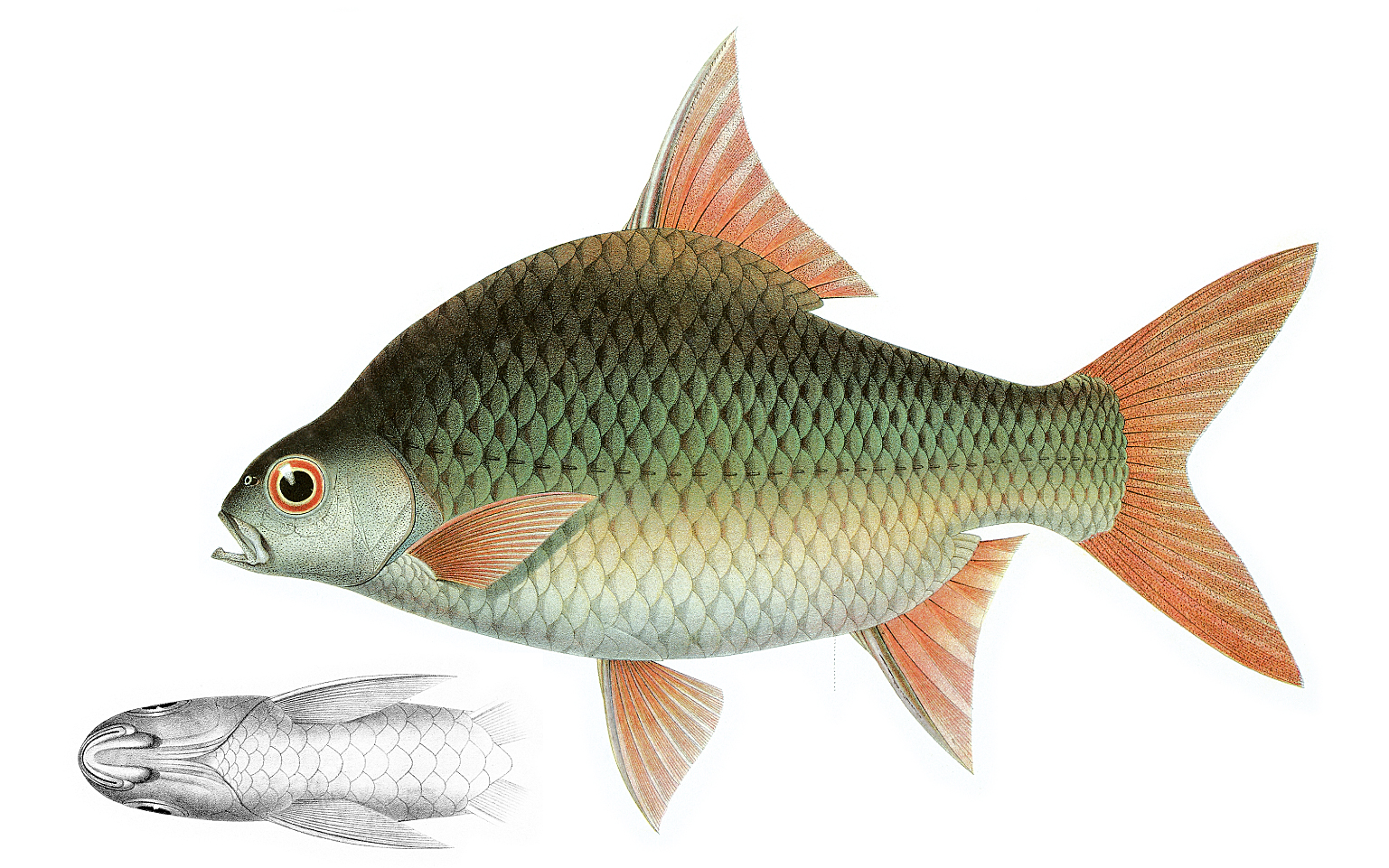

Conservation status
- Least Concern (IUCN 3.1)

Scientific classification
- Kingdom: Animalia
- Phylum: Chordata
- Class: Actinopterygii
- Order: Cypriniformes
- Family: Cyprinidae
- Genus: Puntioplites
- Species: P. waandersi

Binomial name
- Puntioplites waandersi (Bleeker, 1859)

= Puntioplites waandersi =

Species of fish

Puntioplites waandersi is a species of ray-finned fish in the genus Puntioplites from south east Asia and the islands of Sumatra and Borneo.

== Footnotes ==
- Froese, Rainer; Pauly, Daniel (eds.). "Puntioplites waandersi". FishBase.
