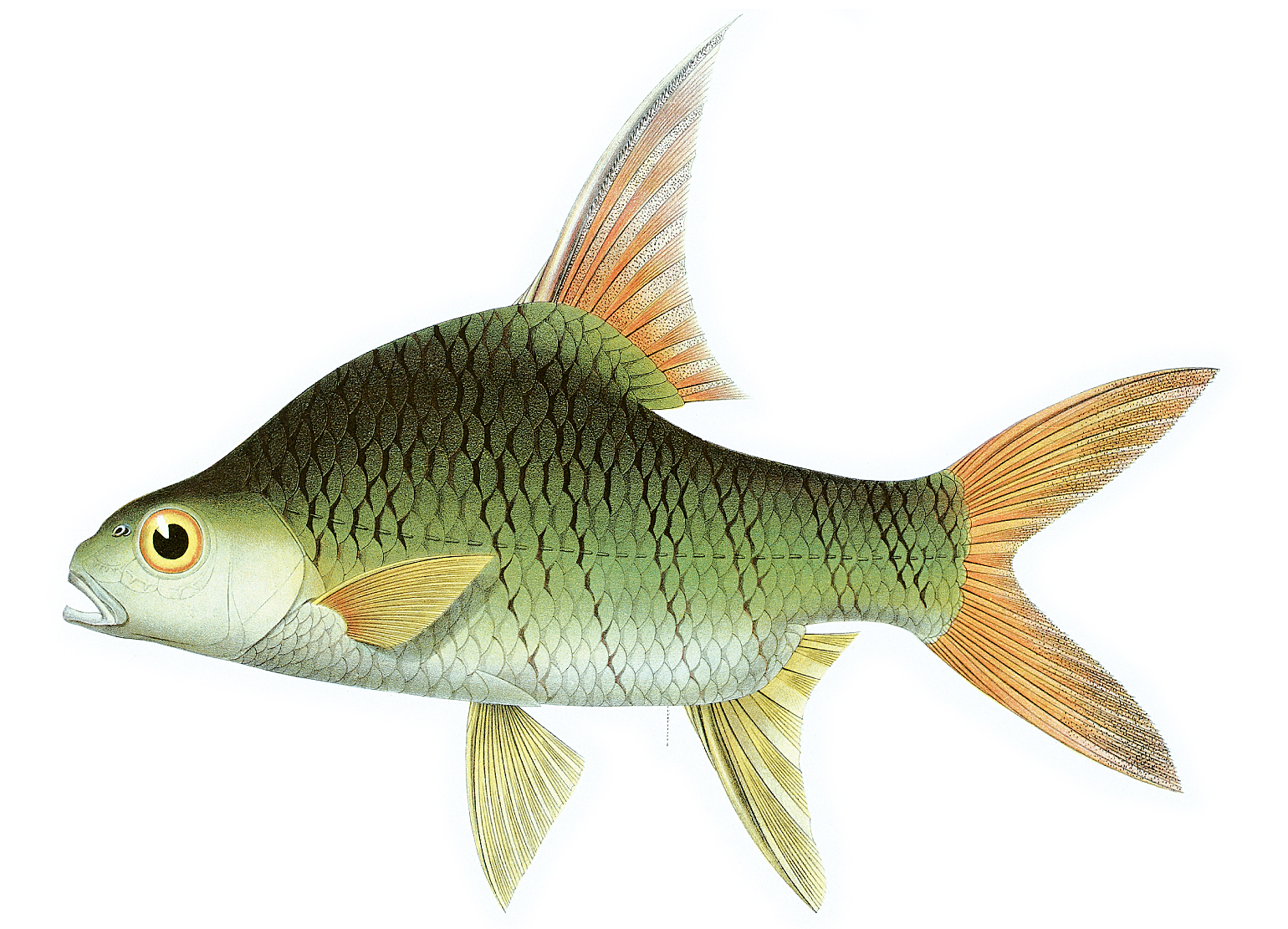

Conservation status
- Least Concern (IUCN 3.1)

Scientific classification
- Kingdom: Animalia
- Phylum: Chordata
- Class: Actinopterygii
- Order: Cypriniformes
- Family: Cyprinidae
- Genus: Puntioplites
- Species: P. bulu

Binomial name
- Puntioplites bulu (Bleeker, 1851)

Synonyms
- Systomus bulu Bleeker, 1851; Barbus bulu (Bleeker, 1851); Puntius bulu (Bleeker, 1851)

= Puntioplites bulu =

Species of fish

Puntioplites bulu is a species of ray-finned fish in the genus Puntioplites, it is a widespread species on mainland south-east Asia and on Borneo but it has been extirpated from Cambodia, and has become rarer in other parts of its range.

== Footnotes ==
- Froese, Rainer; Pauly, Daniel (eds.). "Puntioplites bulu". FishBase.
