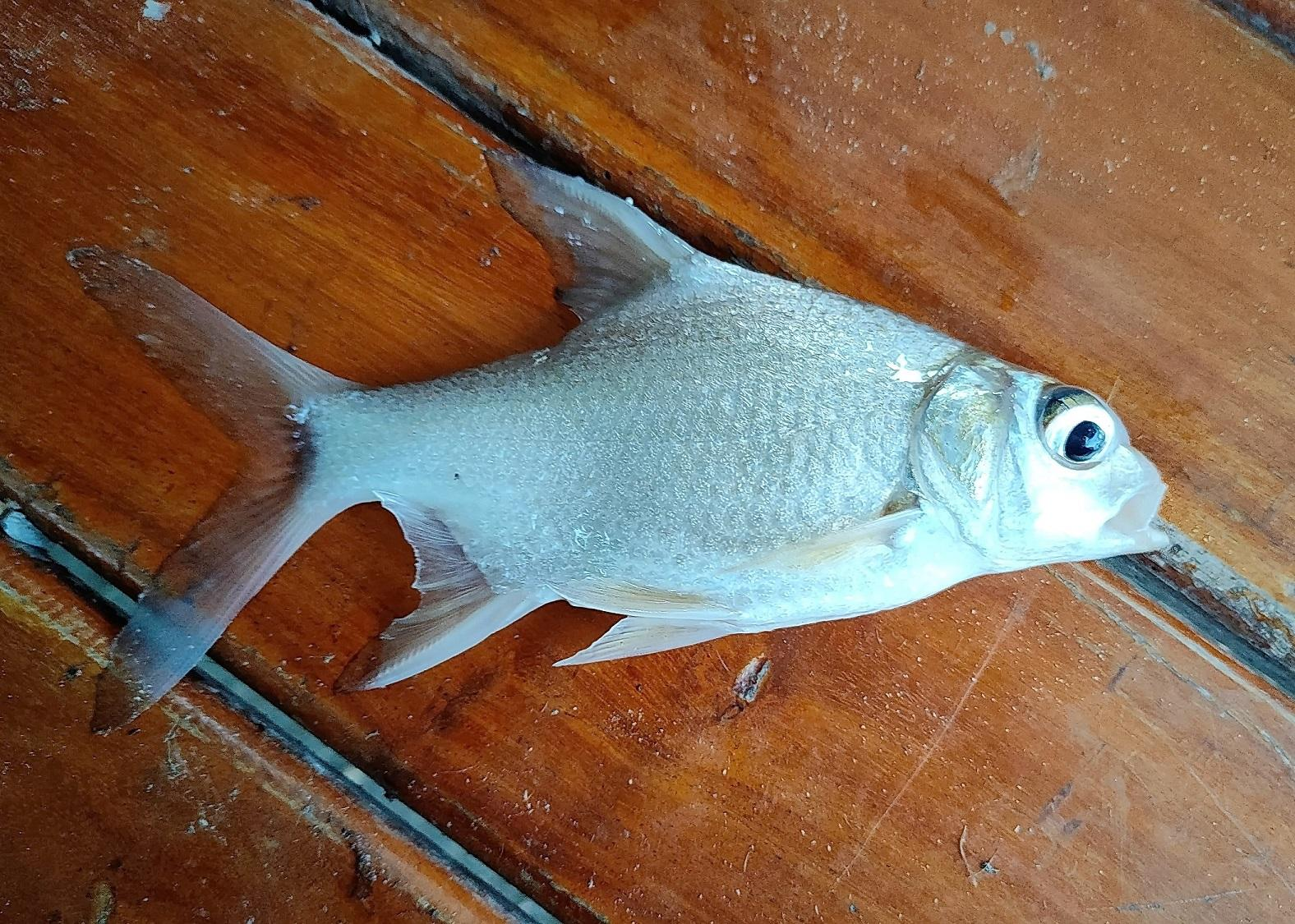
- Puntioplites proctozystron

Scientific classification
- Kingdom: Animalia
- Phylum: Chordata
- Class: Actinopterygii
- Order: Cypriniformes
- Family: Cyprinidae
- Subfamily: Cyprininae
- Genus: Puntioplites; H. M. Smith, 1929

Type species
- Puntius proctozystron Bleeker, 1865

Species
- 4, see text.

Synonyms
- Adamacypris Fowler, 1934

= Puntioplites =

Genus of fishes

Puntioplites is a genus of freshwater ray-finned fish belonging to the family Cyprinidae, the family which includes the carps, barbs, minnows and related fishes. The fishes in this genus are found in eastern Asia.

== Species ==
Puntioplites contains the following species:

- Puntioplites bulu (Bleeker, 1851)
- Puntioplites falcifer H. M. Smith, 1929
- Puntioplites proctozystron (Bleeker, 1865)
- Puntioplites waandersi (Bleeker, 1858–59)
