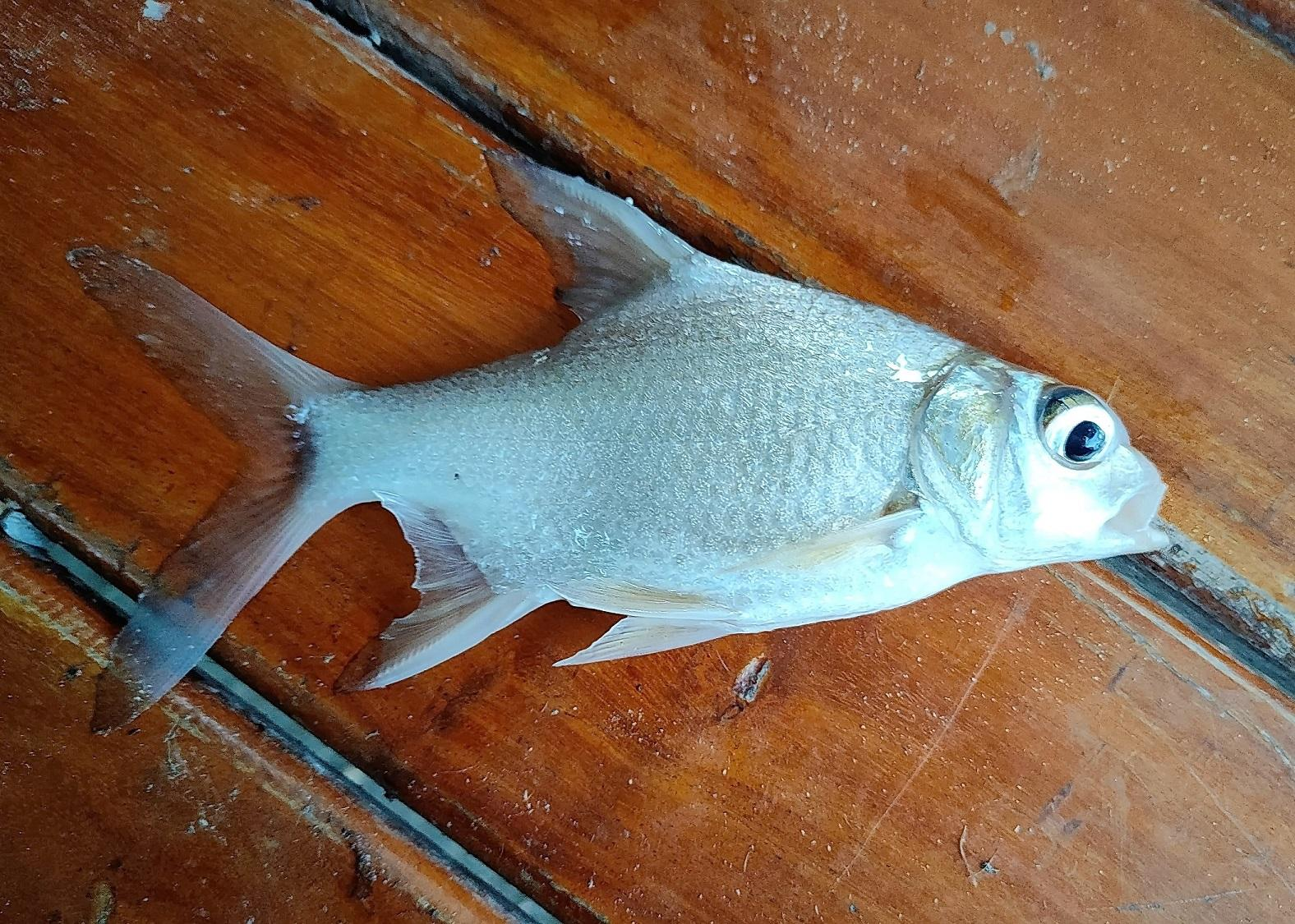

Conservation status
- Least Concern (IUCN 3.1)

Scientific classification
- Kingdom: Animalia
- Phylum: Chordata
- Class: Actinopterygii
- Order: Cypriniformes
- Family: Cyprinidae
- Genus: Puntioplites
- Species: P. proctozystron

Binomial name
- Puntioplites proctozystron (Bleeker, 1865)

Synonyms
- Puntius proctozystron Bleeker, 1865; Barbus proctozystron (Bleeker, 1865)

= Puntioplites proctozystron =

Species of fish

Puntioplites proctozystron, Smith's Barb or Pla Mang (Note: This name is used exclusively in the Bung Boraphet region.) is a species of ray-finned fish in the genus Puntioplites.

In Thailand, it is commonly known as Pla Kamang or Pla Kramang, and is mainly caught for making fermented or pickled fish.

== Footnotes and references ==
=== References ===
- Froese, Rainer; Pauly, Daniel (eds.). "Puntioplites proctozystron". FishBase.
