= Roti sai mai =

Sweet roti with cotton candy

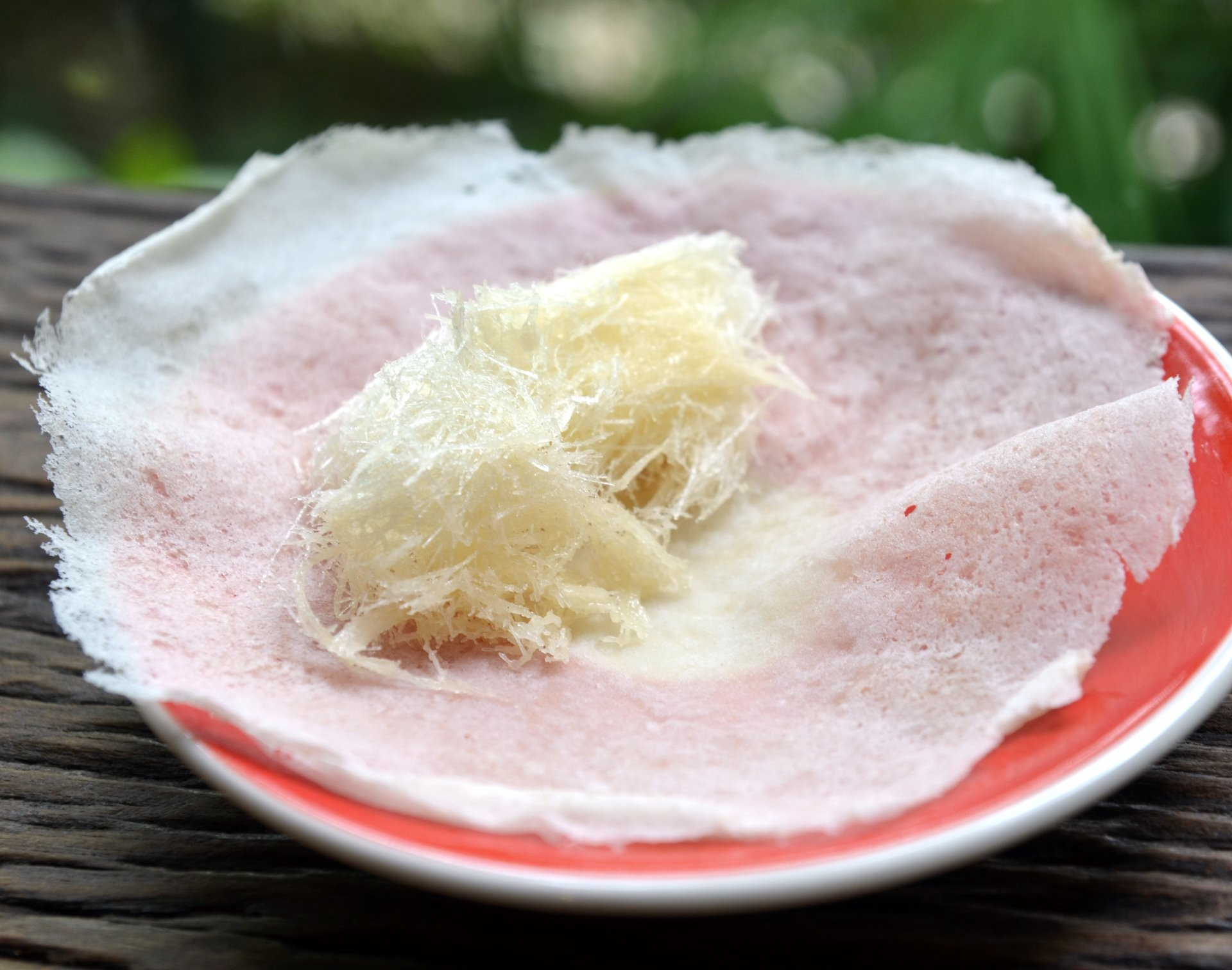
- Unrolled roti sai mai on a plate
- Course: Dessert
- Place of origin: Thailand
- Region or state: Southeast Asia

Roti sai mai (Thai: โรตีสายไหม, pronounced [rōː.tīː.sǎːj.mǎj]; sai mai meaning 'silk thread') is a Southeast Asian dessert from Thailand. Roti sai mai is an Indian Muslim-influenced dessert served by wrapping cotton candy in sweet roti.

The rolling floss or cotton candy is thin, silky strings of spun sugar, found in a variety of hues. The roti (flatbread) is very thin and made from white or colored flour; green flour colored using pandan leaves. Sesame is often sprinkled on the top.

== History ==
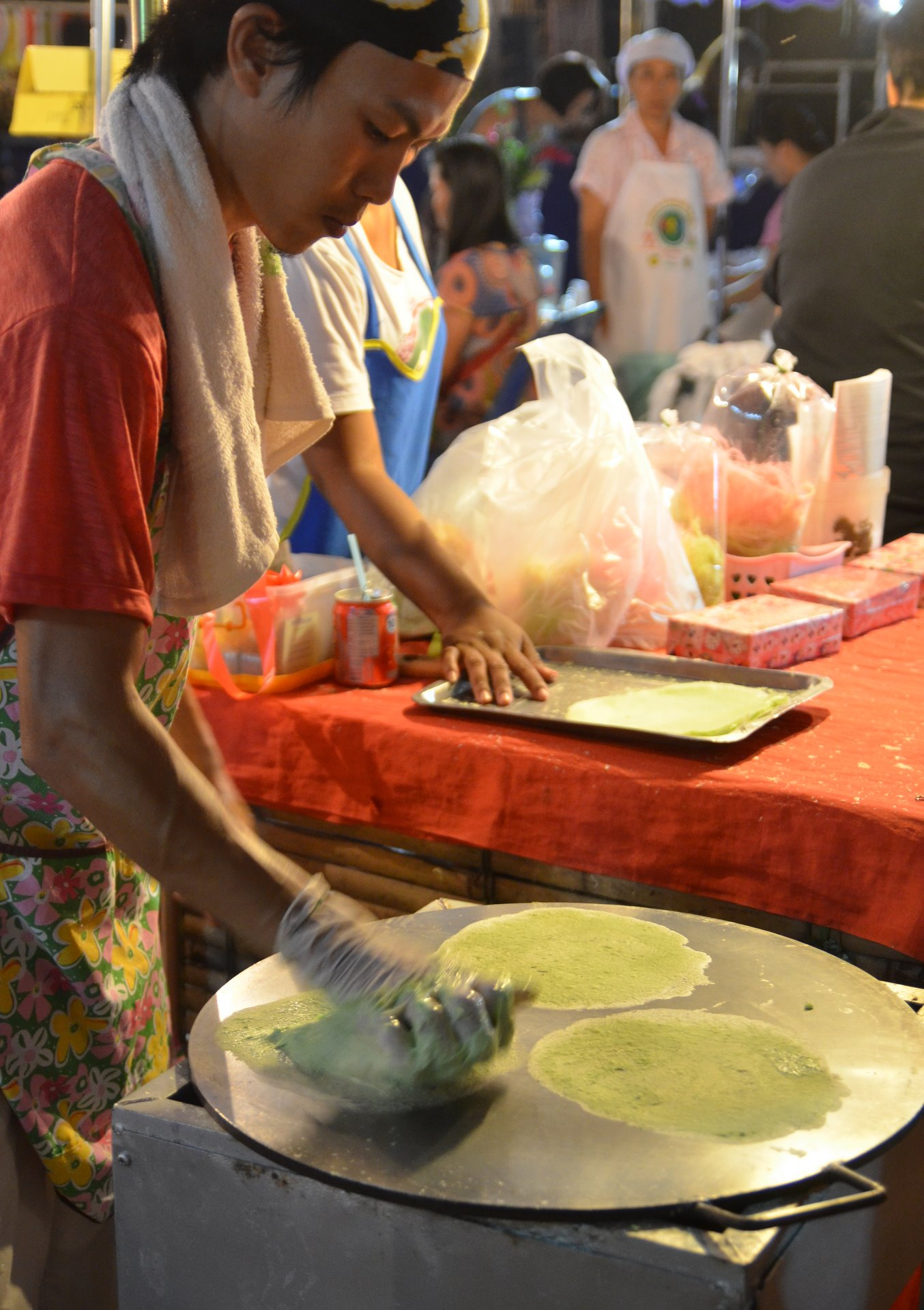
A street vendor making roti sai mai in Uttaradit, Thailand

=== Origins ===
The recipe was initially brought to the Ayutthaya Kingdom by Indian Muslim traders, who produced and marketed the sweet among communities. The dessert was commonly sold at roadside booths in both the city and the countryside.

=== Marketing ===
==== Coin-operated roti sai mai ====
In the 1980s and 1990s, "coin-operated" roti sai mai could be found in markets. These sellers had small bicycles equipped with coin boxes on the backs. Customers would drop a 10 baht coin through the slot, and a rotating dial would spin, cycling through the numbers 3–7. The number the dial ended on was the number of pieces of roti sai mai the customer would get. This popular marketing gimmick allowed customers to "try their luck", and earn more pieces for the same coin. Customers could also just buy pieces at the normal price.

Nowadays, these coin-operated sellers are extremely rare.

==== International marketing ====
One difficulty with the mass-marketing of roti sai mai is its limited shelf life. The dough and floss candy must be consumed within a few days, or the dessert's flavour will degrade, and it will spoil not soon after. The company Candy Crepe, founded by Jainnisa Kuvinichkul, collaborated with the National Science and Technology Development Agency of Thailand to increase the dessert's shelf-life. Their product has a shelf life of 6–12 months without the use of chemical additives.
