= Pridi-Thamrong Bridge =

Bridge in Thailand

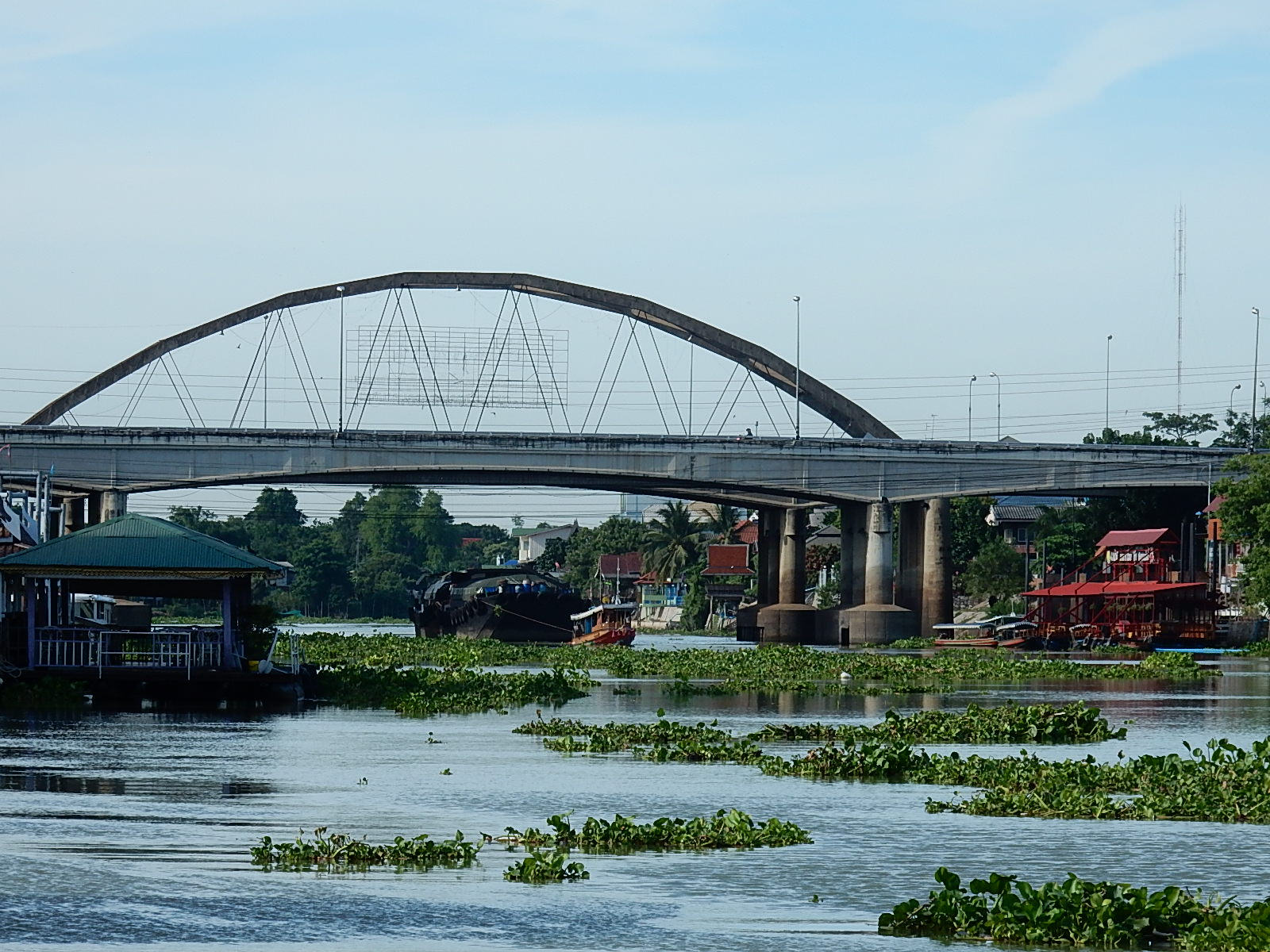
- Pridi-Thamrong Bridge as seen from Pa Sak River
- Coordinates: 14°21′07.8″N 100°34′53.4″E
- Carries: 2 traffic lanes of National Highway 309, pedestrians
- Crosses: Pa Sak River
- Locale: Phra Nakhon Si Ayutthaya, Phra Nakhon Si Ayutthaya District, Phra Nakhon Si Ayutthaya Province, Thailand
- Official name: Pridi-Thamrong Bridge

Characteristics
- Design: Network arch
- Material: Concrete
- Total length: 168.60 m (553.1 ft)

History
- Construction start: 1940
- Construction end: 1943
- Opened: July 14, 1943; 82 years ago

Pridi-Thamrong Bridge (Thai: สะพานปรีดี-ธำรง, pronounced [sā.pʰāːn prīː.dīː tʰām.rōŋ]) is a bridge across the Pa Sak River in Phra Nakhon Si Ayutthaya Province, central Thailand.

== History ==
The bridge was built in 1940 to across Pa Sak River, connecting two areas of Phra Nakhon Si Ayutthaya District (Ayutthaya City), outer Ayutthaya Island and inner Ayutthaya Island. The city of Ayutthaya is surrounded by four waterways, the north–the Lop Buri River, the west–the Chao Phraya River, the east–the Pa Sak River, and the south–the confluence of the Chao Phraya and the Pa Sak Rivers, therefore, it has an island-like terrain. The locals' transportation relies mainly on boats.

It was completed and opened for use on July 14, 1943, the birthday of Field Marshal Plaek Phibunsongkhram, Prime Minister at that time, with Rear Admiral Luang Thamrongnawasawat (Thawan Thamrongnawasawat) the Minister of Justice presided over the opening ceremony. The bridge was named in honour of Pridi Banomyong and Luang Thamrongnawasawat, who were key figures in the government who were born in Ayutthaya. The foot of the bridge on the outer Ayutthaya Island lies near Wat Phichai, a place where Phraya Tak (later King Taksin) used as a breakout point for the Burmese army to the east before the fall of Ayutthaya in 1767.

The importance of this bridge, in addition to helping to increase the convenience of transportation. It also helps the communities in the Ayutthaya Island to become bustling again. It was the idea of Pridi Banomyong who wants the Ayutthaya people to come back to live in the city. Prior that it had been desolate since the King Chulalongkorn's reign (Rama V).

== Presently ==
Nowadays, it is sandwiched by the Naresuan and the Ekathotsarot Bridges that were replaced. However, the Pridi-Thamrong Bridge is still in operation, being converted into a thoroughfare for compact cars and motorbikes.
