= Wat Phanan Choeng =

Buddhist temple in Ayutthaya, Thailand

Coordinates: 14°20′39″N 100°34′44″E

Wat Phanan Choeng Worawihan
- วัดพนัญเชิงวรวิหาร
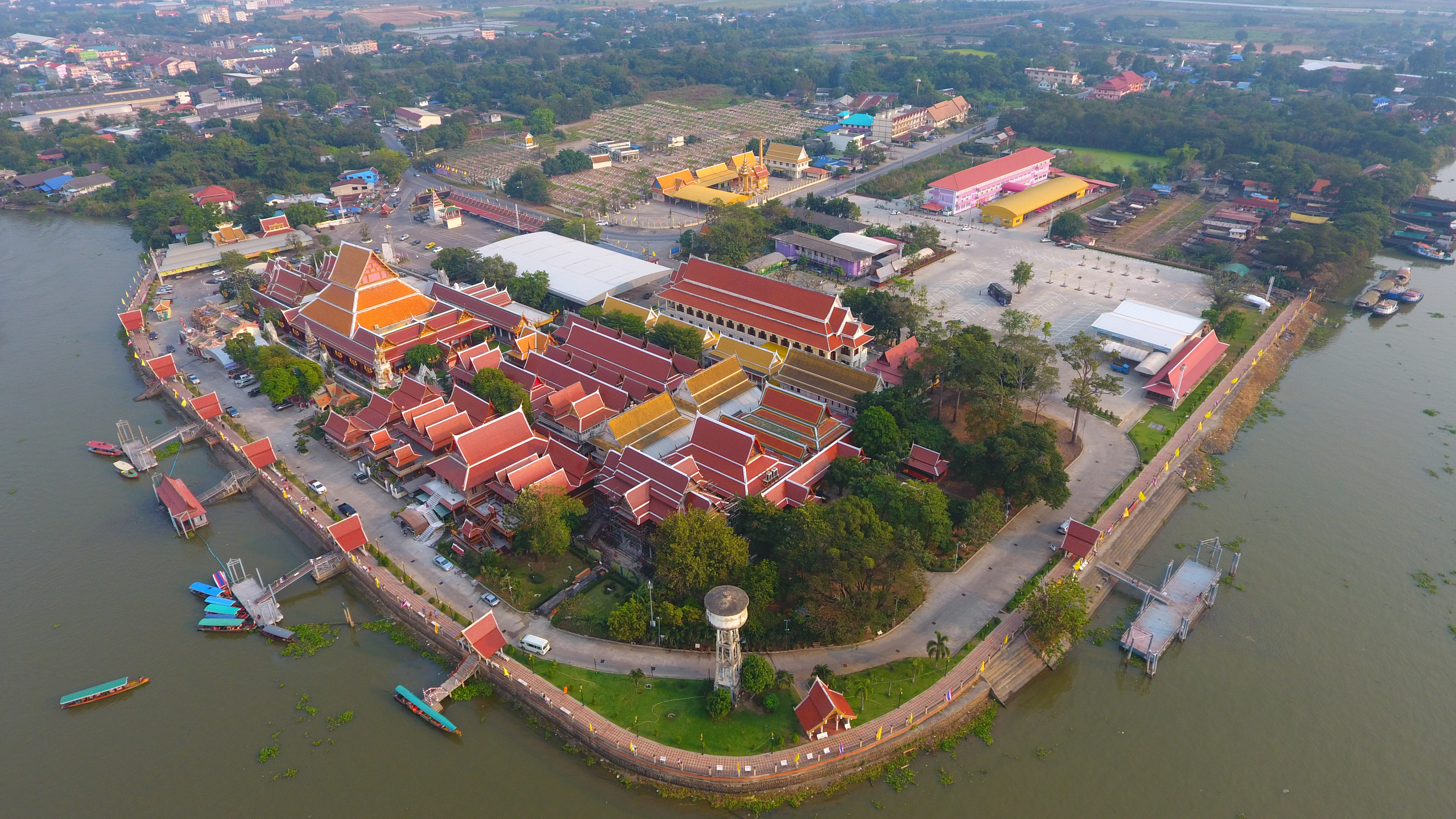
- Aerial view of Wat Phanan Choeng Worawihan

Religion
- Affiliation: Theravada Buddhism
- District: Ayutthaya
- Province: Ayutthaya
- Deity: Buddha (Phra Phanan Choeng / Luang Pho Tho)
- Rite: Mahanikaya
- Year consecrated: 1324
- Status: Active

Location
- Location: Southeast of Ayutthaya Island, at the confluence of the Chao Phraya River and Pa Sak River
- Country: Thailand
- Interactive map of Wat Phanan Choeng Worawihan

Architecture
- Type: Buddhist temple
- Style: Ayutthaya

Wat Phanan Choeng (Thai: วัดพนัญเชิง; pronunciation) is a Buddhist temple in the city of Ayutthaya, Thailand, on the east bank of the Chao Phraya River at the south-eastern side of the confluence of the Chao Phraya and Pa Sak rivers.

Today, as part of the Ayutthaya Historical Park, the temple is a popular tourist attraction.

== History ==
=== Founding ===
Built in 1324, some 27 years before the city of Ayutthaya was officially founded, the temple must have been partly connected to early settlements in the area, which are said to have included a refugee community of about two hundred people from Song dynasty China. Those refugees reached the gulf in 1282, and the Chinese court sent a mission to Xiān to recover them; a Song official took refuge there himself in the following year, which Chris Baker and Pasuk Phongpaichit read as showing that the place was already known as a haven.

The date comes from the Luang Prasoet chronicle, which records the establishment of the Phananchoeng image in 686 of the lesser era, 1324/5, as its first entry and 27 years before the foundation it dates to 1351. Baker and Pasuk take that notice, together with the visits of Sukhothai monks in the 1320s and 1340s, as evidence of a substantial town on the site well before the official foundation.

=== Large Buddha statue ===
The large wihan, the highest building within the temple complex, houses an immense gilded 19 meter high seated Buddha from 1334 CE. The chronicle date of 1324/5 belongs to the image rather than to the wihan, and Baker and Pasuk suggest that it may then have stood in the open outside the city, on the pattern of the Palelai image at Suphan Buri. This highly revered Buddha statue is called Luang Pho Tho (Thai: หลวงพ่อโต) by Thais, and Sam Pao Kong (Thai: ซำเปากง) by Thai-Chinese. The statue is regarded as a guardian for mariners. Allegedly, prior to the destruction of Ayutthaya by the Burmese in 1767 CE, "tears flowed from the sacred eyes to the sacred navel". The statue has been restored several times in history. King Mongkut named the statue Phra Puttha Thrai Ratana Nayok after its restoration in 1854 CE.

Luang Pho Tho

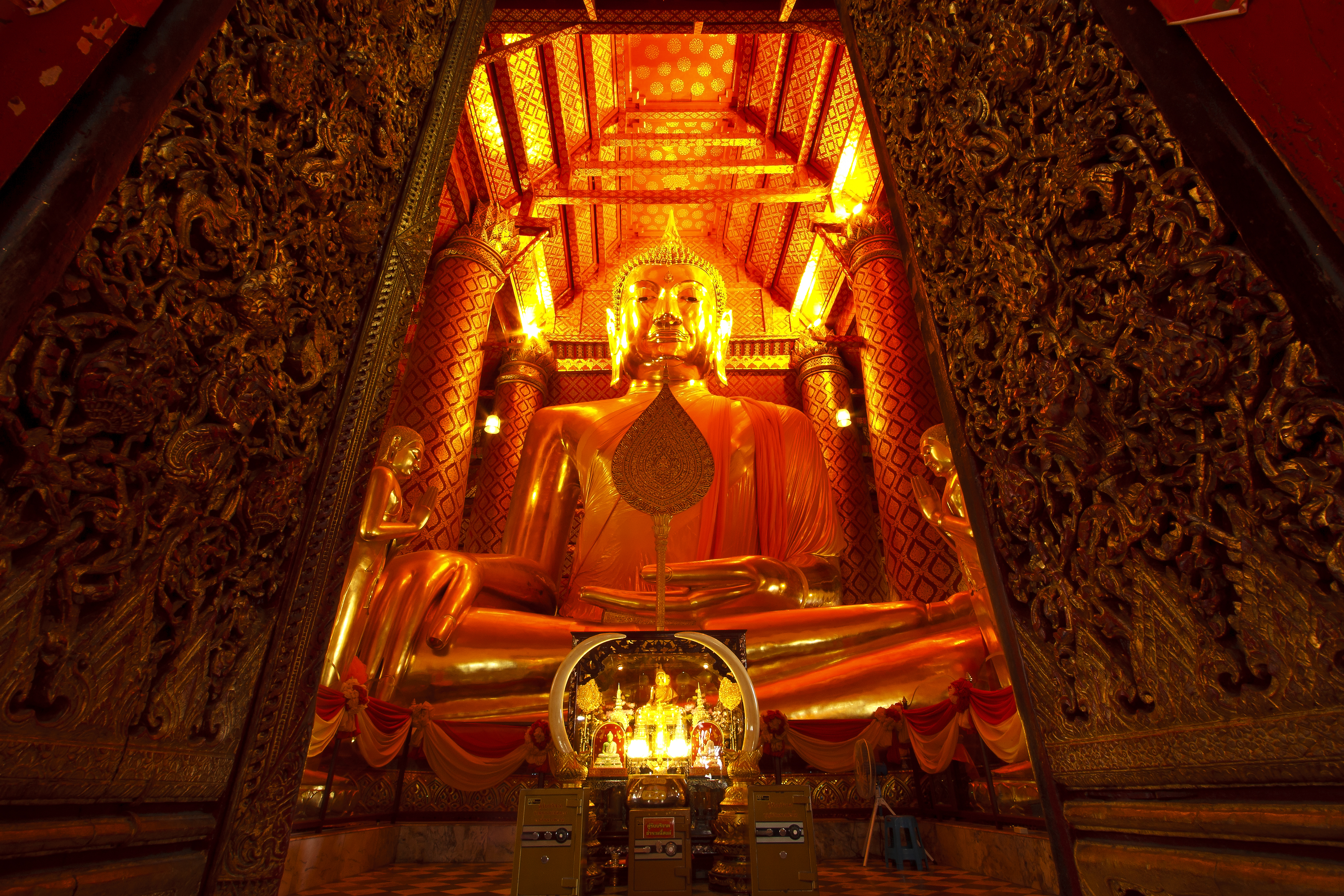

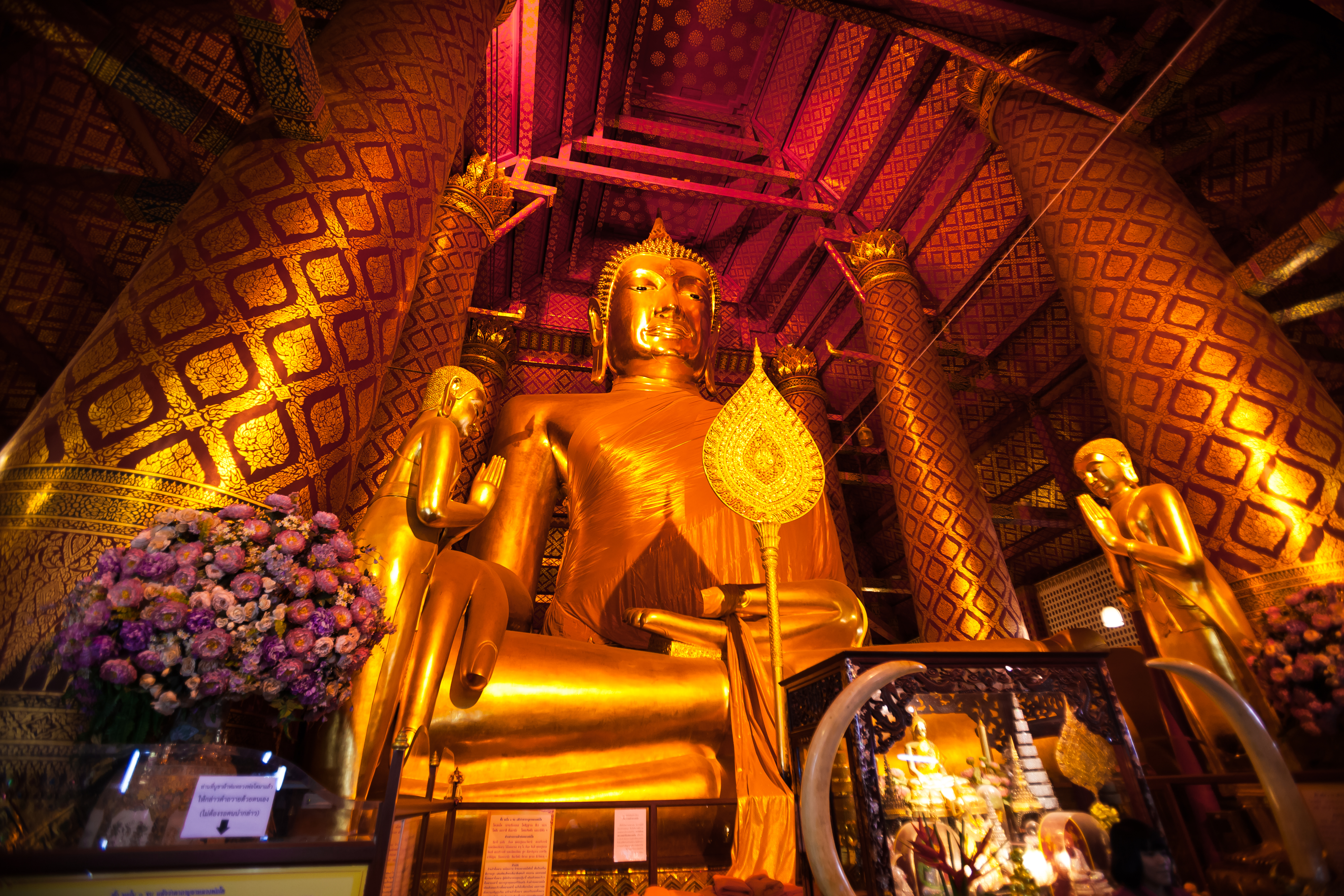

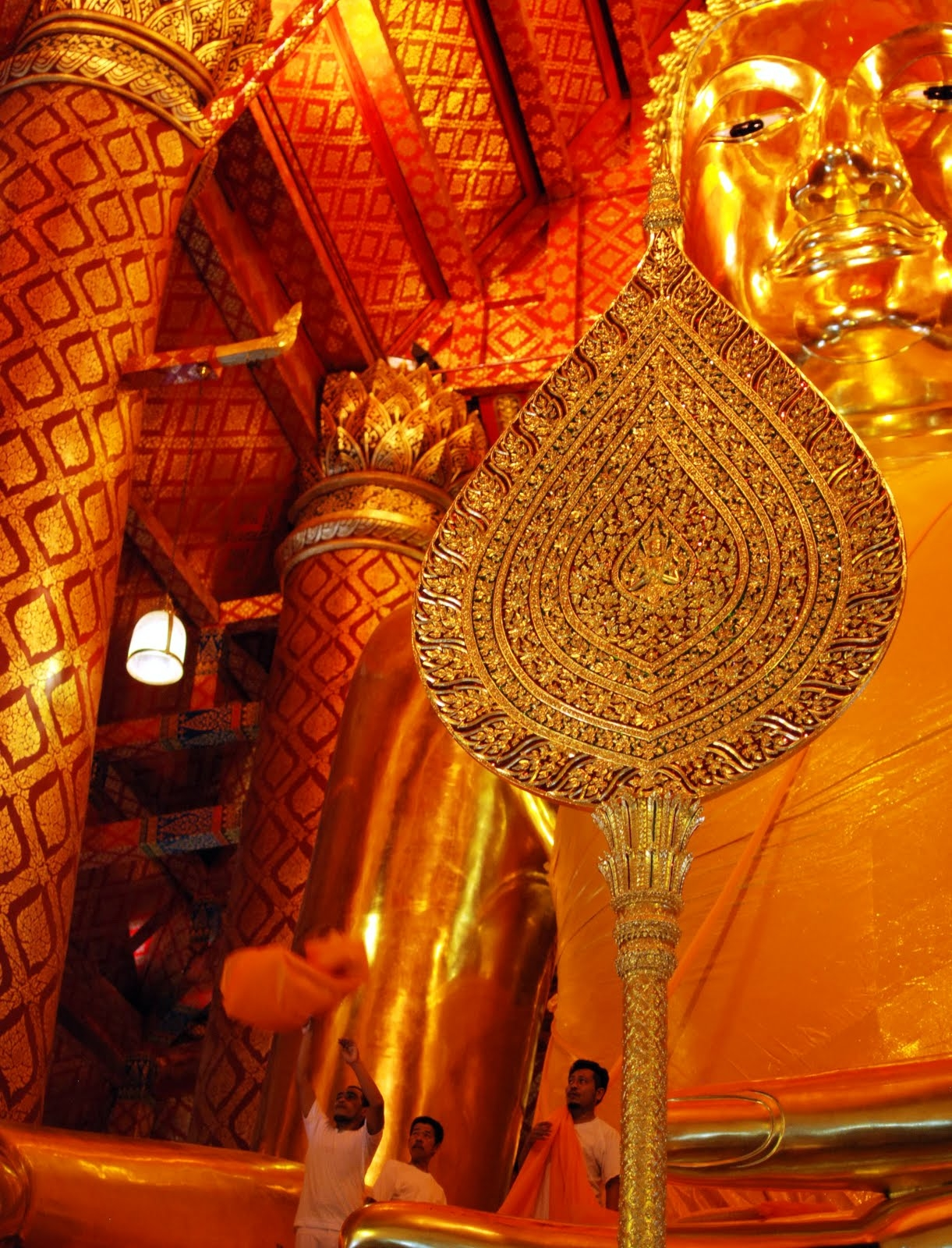

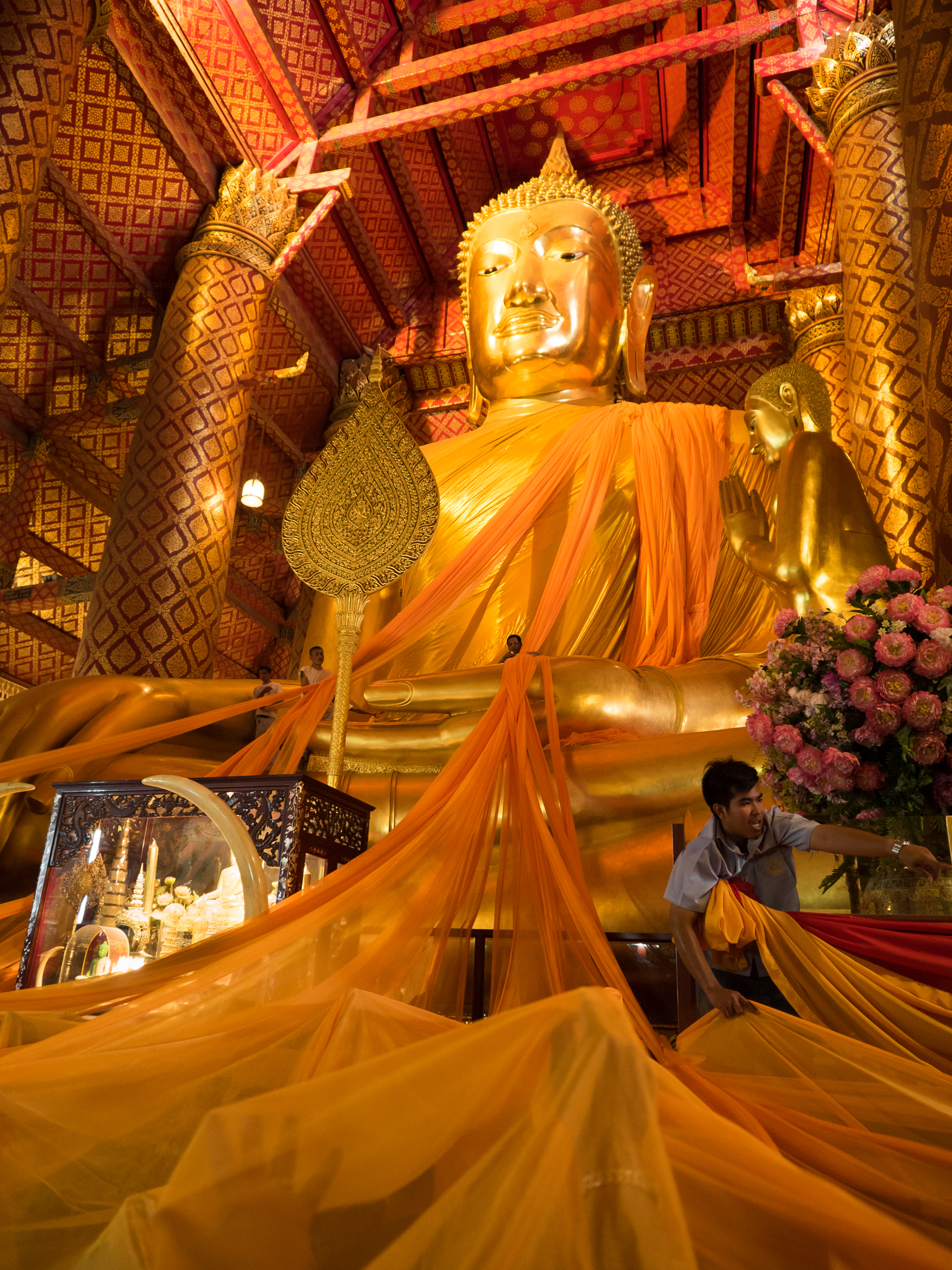

=== Visit by Zheng He ===
The temple was visited in 1407 CE by Zheng He, a Chinese Muslim eunuch admiral from Yunnan who leading his second Ming imperial voyage. He bestowed gifts upon the temple in a great ceremony that included Siamese royal participation, and is today remembered by Thai-Chinese visitors who still visit the temple in his honour.

=== Toponymy ===
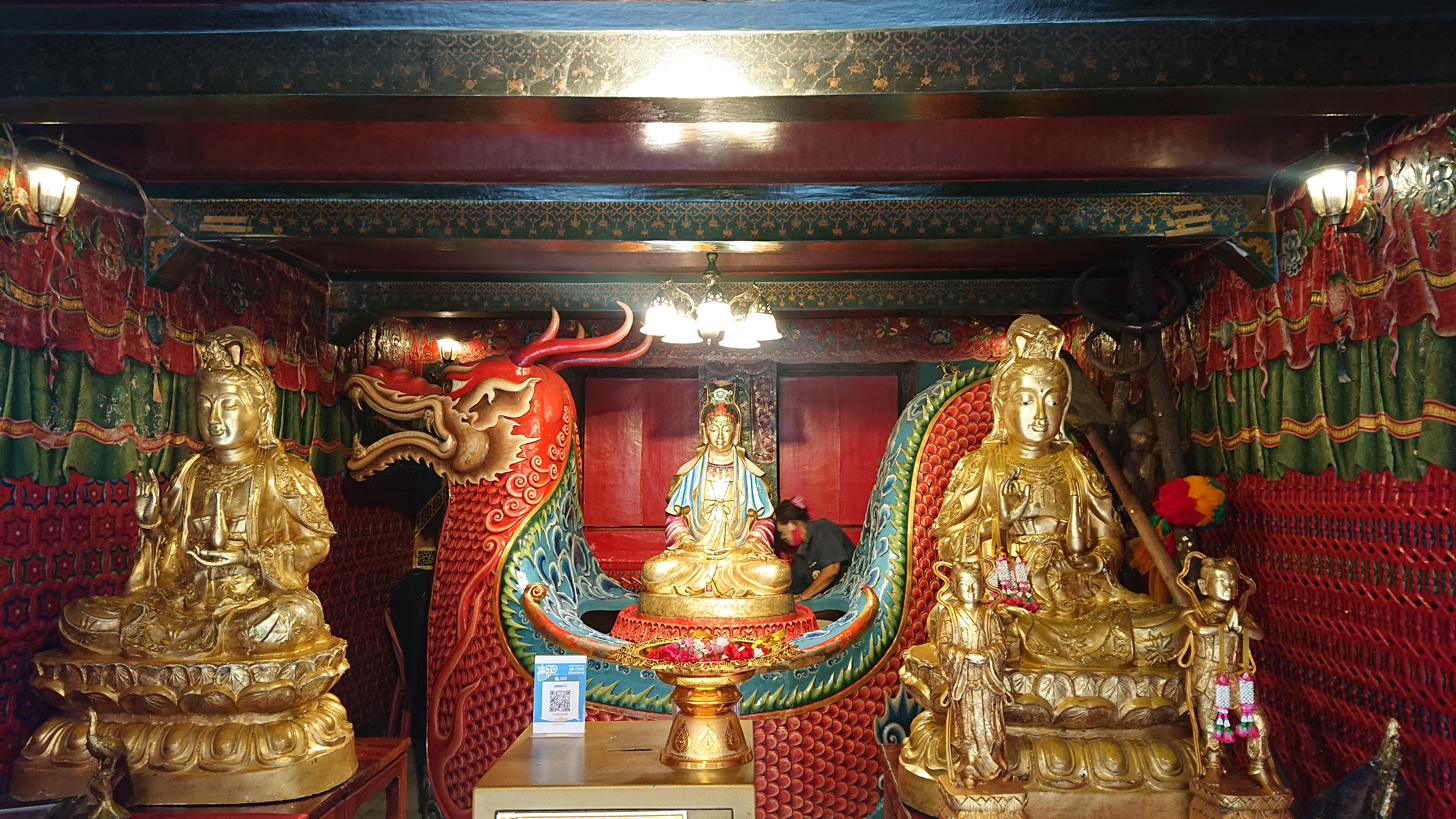
Statue of Chao Mae Soi Dok Mak within her dedicated shrine.

Its name Phanan Choeng has two origins. The first is the legend of princess Soi Dok Mak. In it the Chinese emperor gives his daughter, princess Soi Dok Mak (Thai: เจ้าหญิงสร้อยดอกหมาก), to prince Sai Nam Pheung (Thai: เจ้าชายสายน้ำผึ้ง). The emperor sent the princess by the beautifully decorated junk to Ayutthaya. After the ship landed, it appeared prince Sai Nam Pheung did not send anyone to welcome her, so she was disappointed but he teased her saying "if you don't want to get out the ship, stay there" then the princess held her breath until she died. Prince Sai Nam Pheung was in mourning and ordered workers to build a shrine as a remembrance of his beloved Soi Dok Mak. Locals believe that the legend may be the origin of the temple which is derived from Pra Nang Long Choeng (Thai: พระนางลองเชิง, "Her Majesty took a stance"). Today, a shrine dedicated to her stands at the end of the temple. Baker and Pasuk record the same tradition in a form that attaches it to the Buddha image, which they say was erected at the princess's cremation site and became a place of pilgrimage for Chinese traders. The shrine is a place where one can ask for blessings, especially in matters of love and career.

Historically, the name Phanan Choeng derived from the Khmer, Phanaeng means "overlap" or "interlace" and Choeng means "foot", overall meaning refers to the Luang Pho Tho's cross-legged posture.

== Visiting information ==
Wat Phanan Choeng is located in Khlong Suan Plu Sub-district, Phra Nakhon Si Ayutthaya District, Phra Nakhon Si Ayutthaya, Thailand, 13000.

It is open daily from 8 am to 5 pm. The entrance fee is 20 baht, paid at a small booth at the entrance.

The temple may be reached from Bangkok by road Asia (Highway 32).

Via public transit, the temple may be reached from New Mor Chit station, where there are many buses to Ayutthaya every day. It may also be reached by vans at the Victory Monument or Future Park Rangsit. One may also take a motorcycle taxi or auto rickshaw to Wat Phanan Choeng.

By train, after going from Bangkok railway station to Ayutthaya railway station, one may take a motorcycle taxi or auto rickshaw to reach the temple.

== Gallery ==
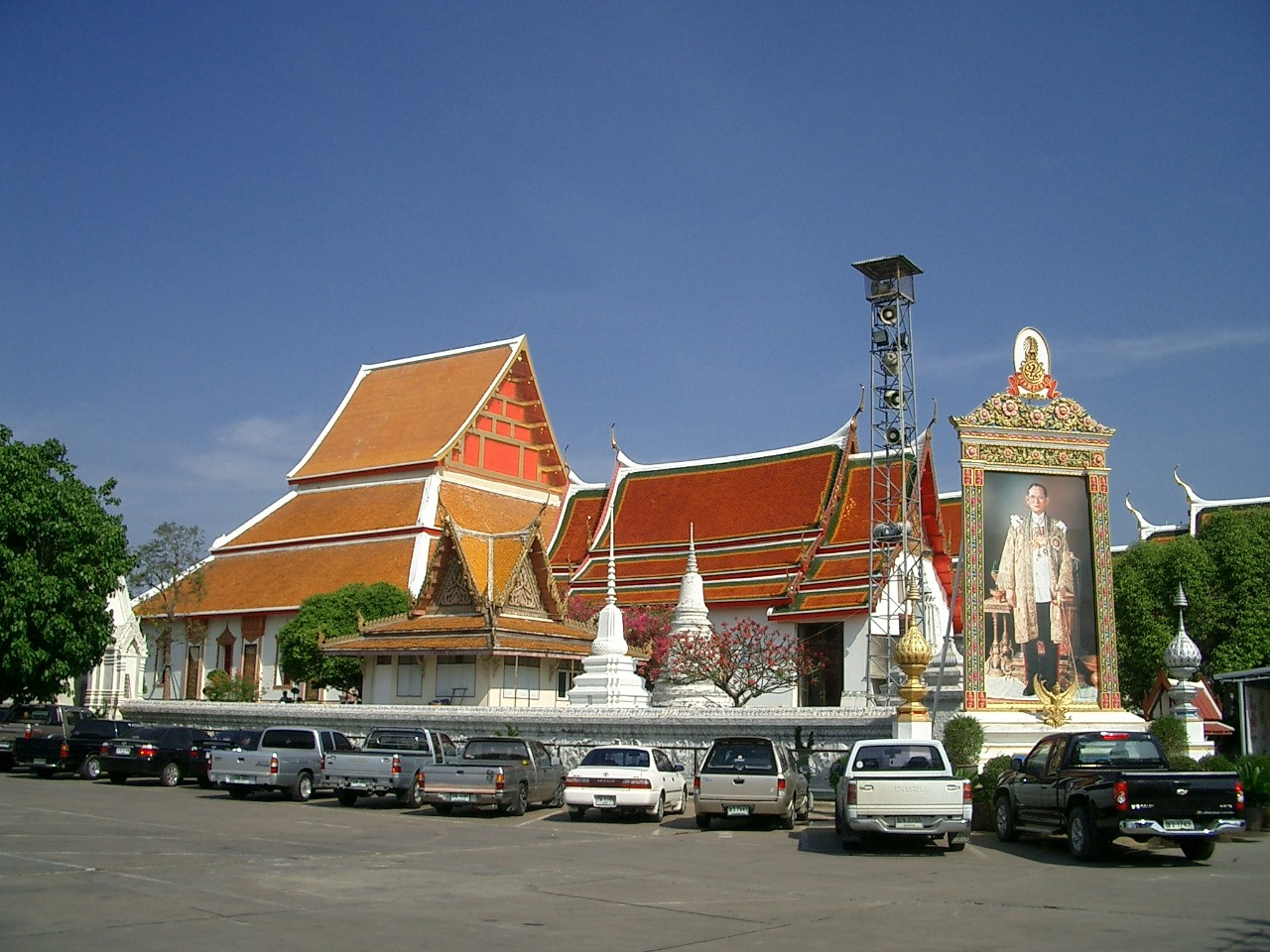
Wat Phanan Choeng in 2006

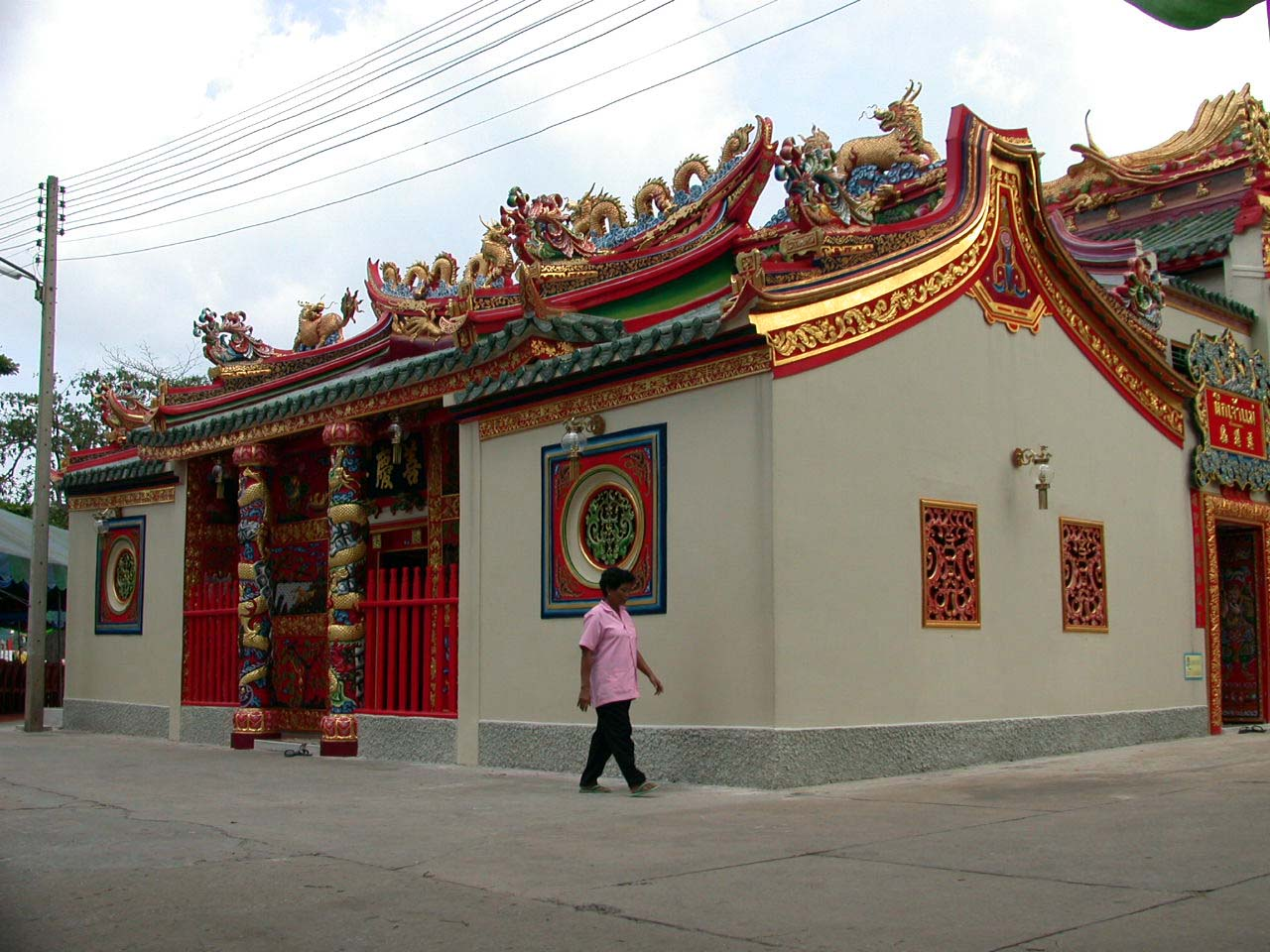
The shrine to the Chinese princess Soi Dok Mak

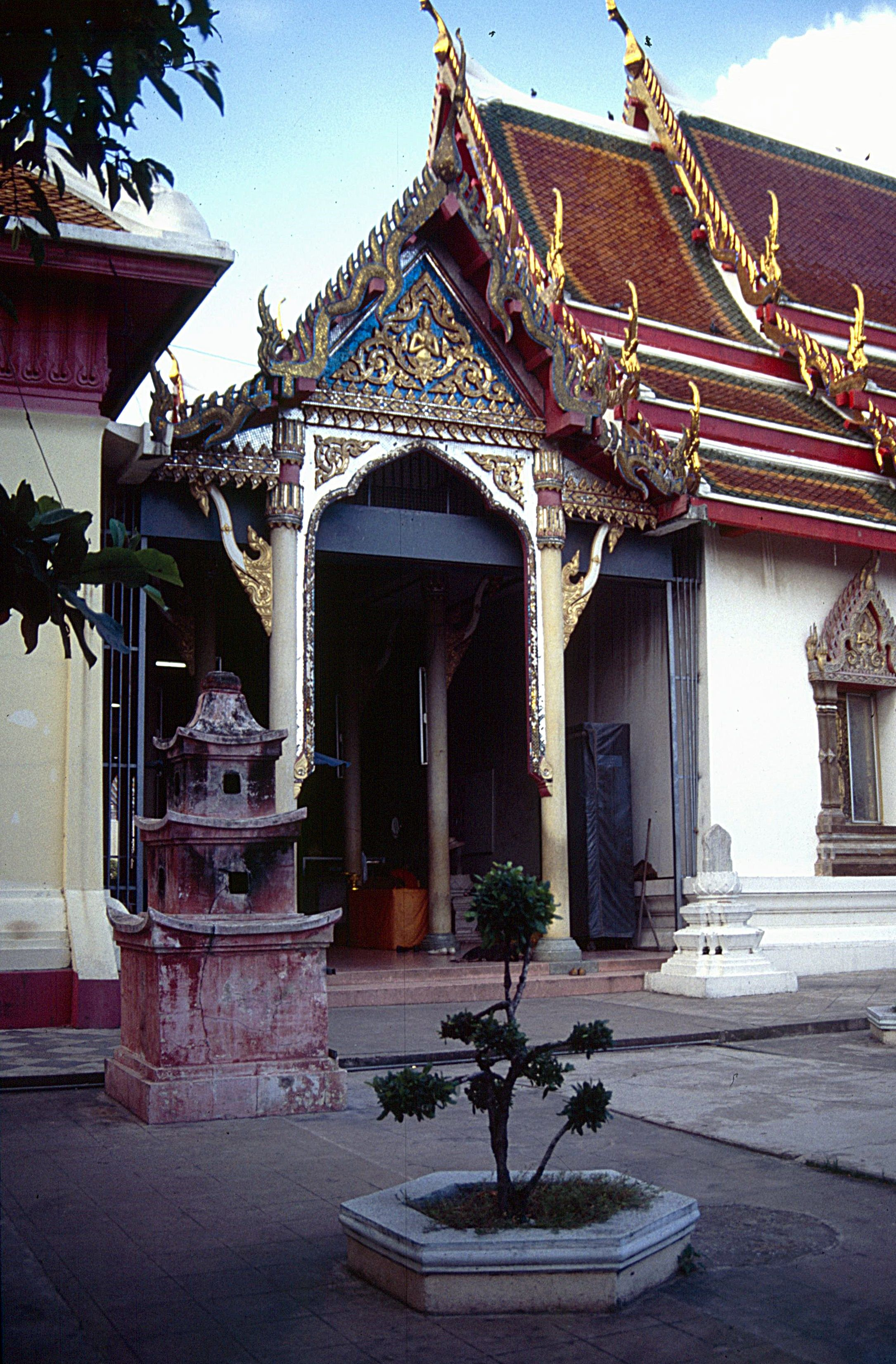

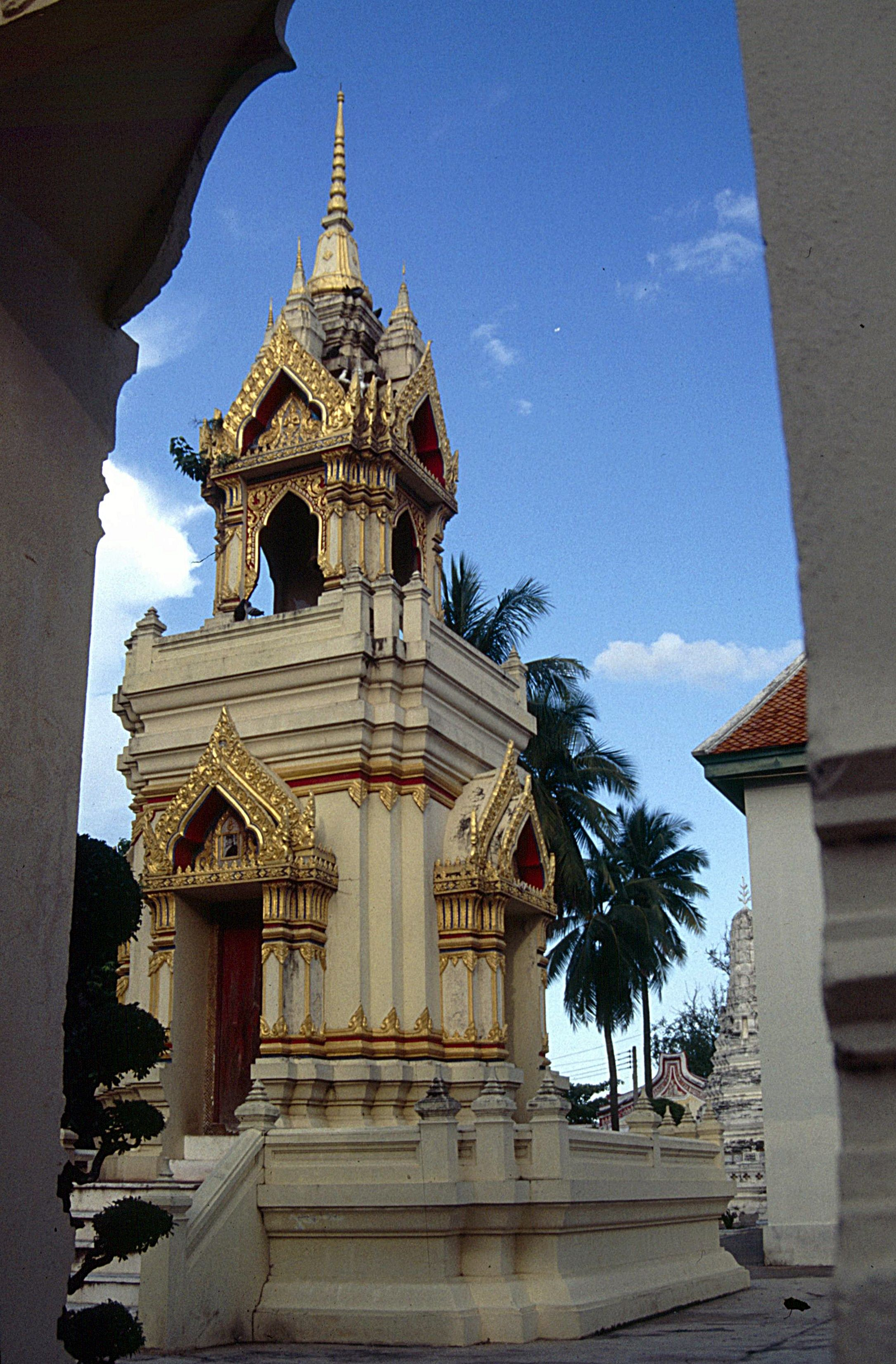

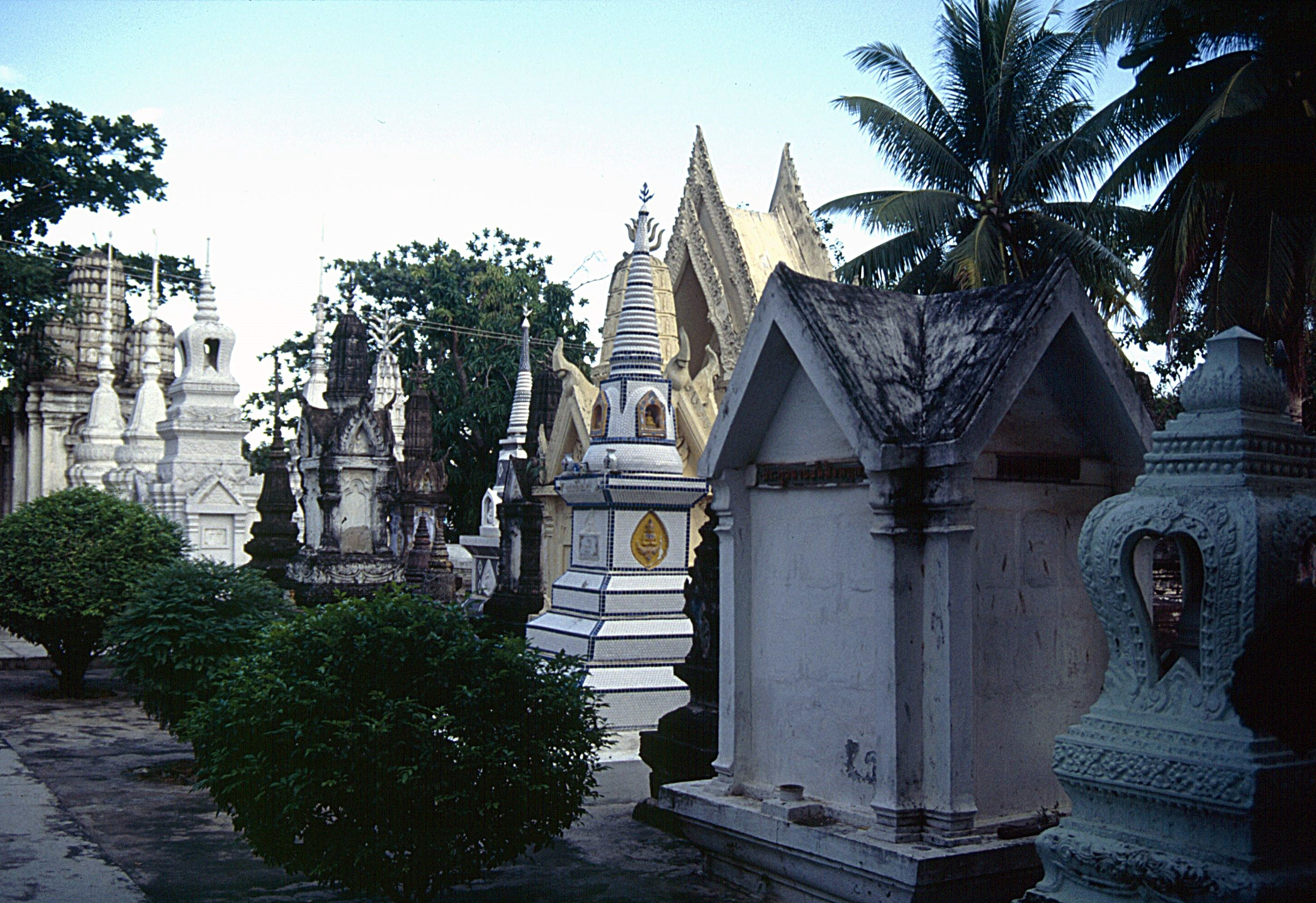

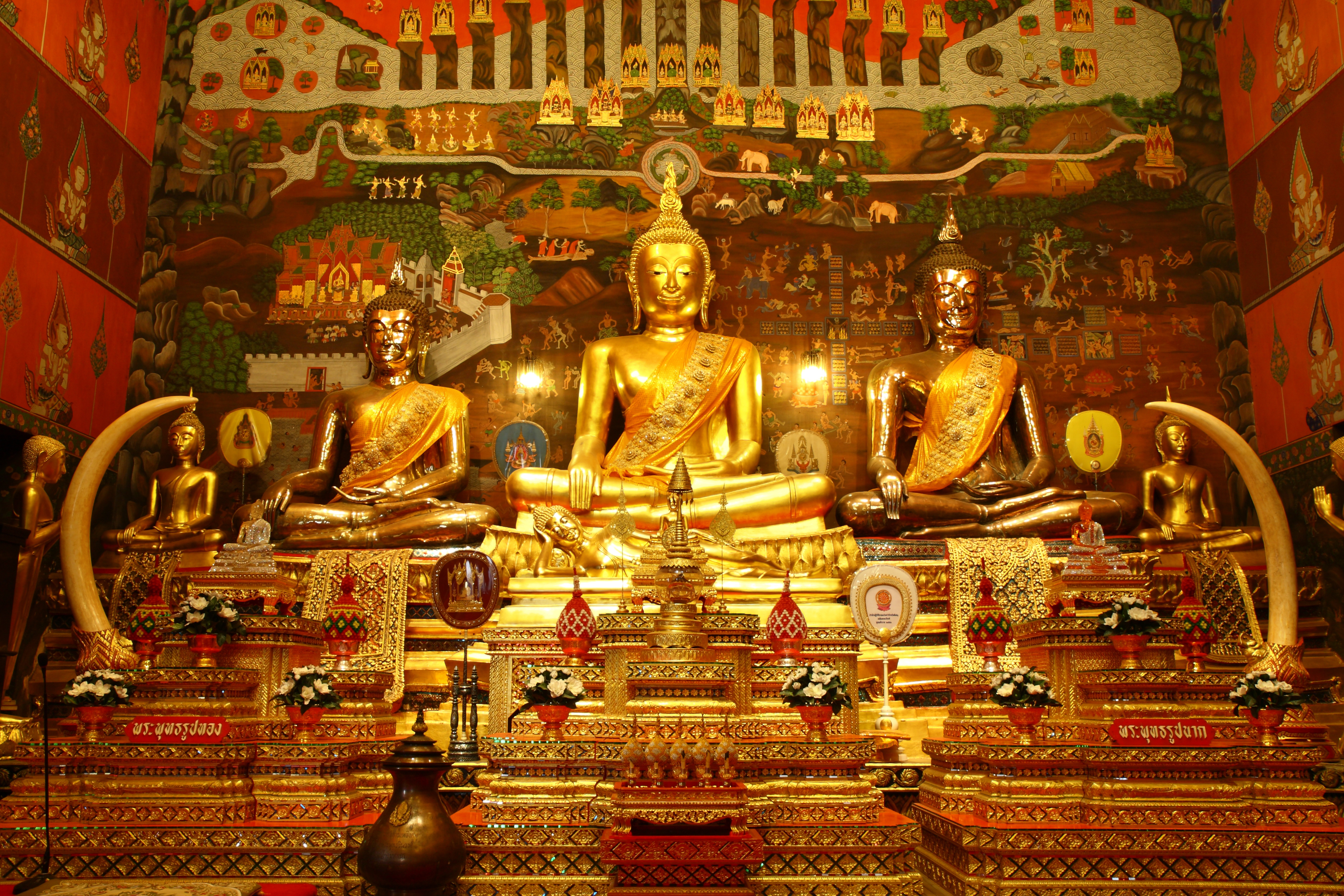
Buddha images made of gold, stucco, and nak (pink gold alloy) inside the ordination hall.
