= Japanese in Thailand =

Japanese in Thailand may refer to:

- Japanese community in pre-Thailand
- Japanese invasion of Thailand during World War II
- Japanese military alliance with Thailand during World War II
- Japanese migration to Thailand, ranging from the 17th century to the present
- Japanese language education in Thailand
