= Japan–Thailand relations =

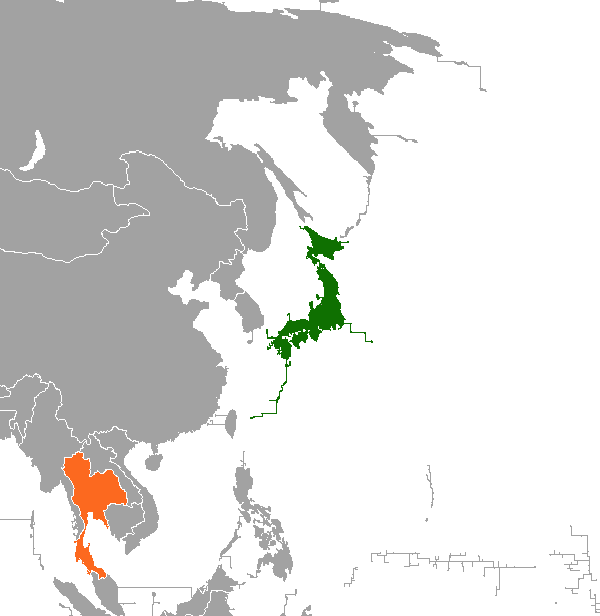
- Japan: Thailand

Diplomatic mission
- Embassy of Japan, Bangkok: Royal Thai Embassy, Tokyo

Envoy
- Ambassdor Masato Otaka: Ambassdor Witchu Vejjajiva

Japan–Thailand relations refer to bilateral relations between Japan and Thailand. Contacts had an early start with Japanese trade on Red Seal ships and the installation of Japanese communities on Siamese soil, only to be broken off with Japan's period of seclusion. Contacts resumed in the 19th century and developed to the point where Japan is today one of Thailand's foremost economic partners. Thailand and Japan share the distinction of never having lost sovereignty to the European powers during the colonial period, and both countries were Axis partners during the later part of World War II.

== First contacts ==
As early as 1593, Siamese chronicles record that the Siamese king Naresuan had 500 Japanese soldiers in his army when he defeated Phra Maha Uparaja, the Burmese Crown Prince, in a battle on elephant-back.

In December 1605, John Davis, the famous English explorer, was killed by Japanese pirates off the coast of Siam (Thailand), thus becoming the first Englishman to be killed by a Japanese.

== Red Seal trade ==
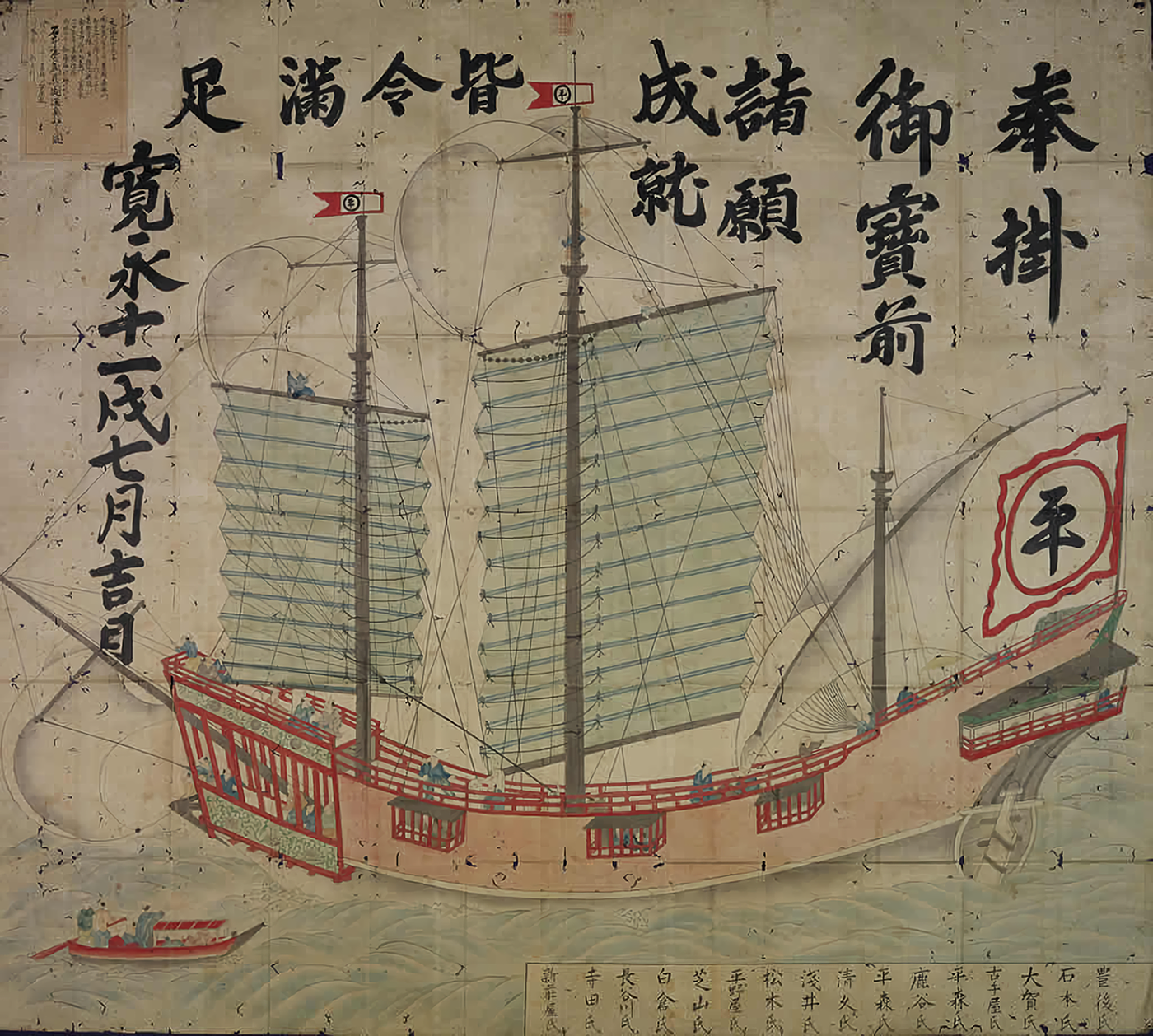
A 1634 Japanese Red Seal ship. Nagasaki City Museum.

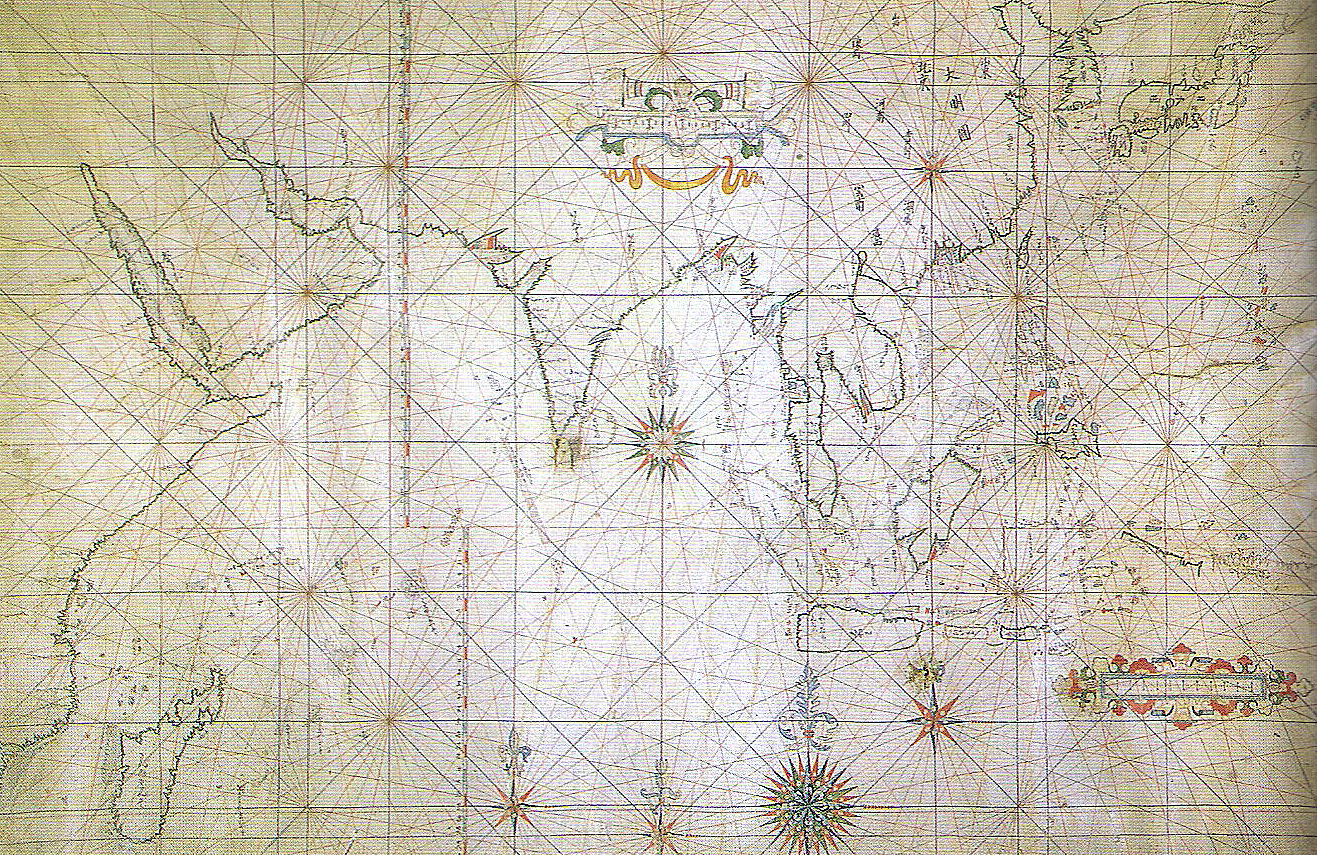
Japanese portolan sailing map, depicting the Indian Ocean and the East Asian coast, early 17th century.

Around 56 Red Seal ships to Siam are recorded between 1604 and 1635. By around 1620, the trade between Siam and Japan was larger than the total trade of Siam with all other nations.

A Japanese colony was established in Siam. The colony was active in trade, particularly in the export of deer-hide and sappan wood to Japan in exchange for Japanese silver and Japanese handicrafts (swords, lacquered boxes, high-quality papers). From Siam, Japan was interested in purchasing Chinese silks, as well as deerskins and ray or shark skins (used to make a sort of shagreen for Japanese sword handles and scabbards).

The Japanese were noted by the Dutch for challenging the trade monopoly of the Dutch East India Company (VOC), as their strong position with the King of Siam typically allowed them to buy at least 50% of the total production, leaving small quantities of a lesser quality to other traders.

The king of Siam sent numerous embassies to Japan: in 1621, an embassy led by Khun Pichitsombat and Khun Prasert, in 1623 by Luang Thongsamut and Khun Sawat, and in 1626 by Khun Raksasittiphon. Letters from King Songtham praise the relationship between the two countries:

"The existence of a sea separating Thailand and Japan has made contact between our two nations difficult. However, merchant ships of both nations now ply regularly between our two countries, causing relations to become even closer. It is now apparent that you (the shōgun) have sincere affection for us, an affection even stronger than that of our immediate kin."

— Letter by King Songtham.

The shōgun responded in similar terms:

"The cordial relations between our two countries cannot be destroyed. Since we both have mutual trust, the existence of a sea between us is not of any significance."

— Letter by the Tokugawa shōgun to King Songtham.

== Japanese community in Siam ==
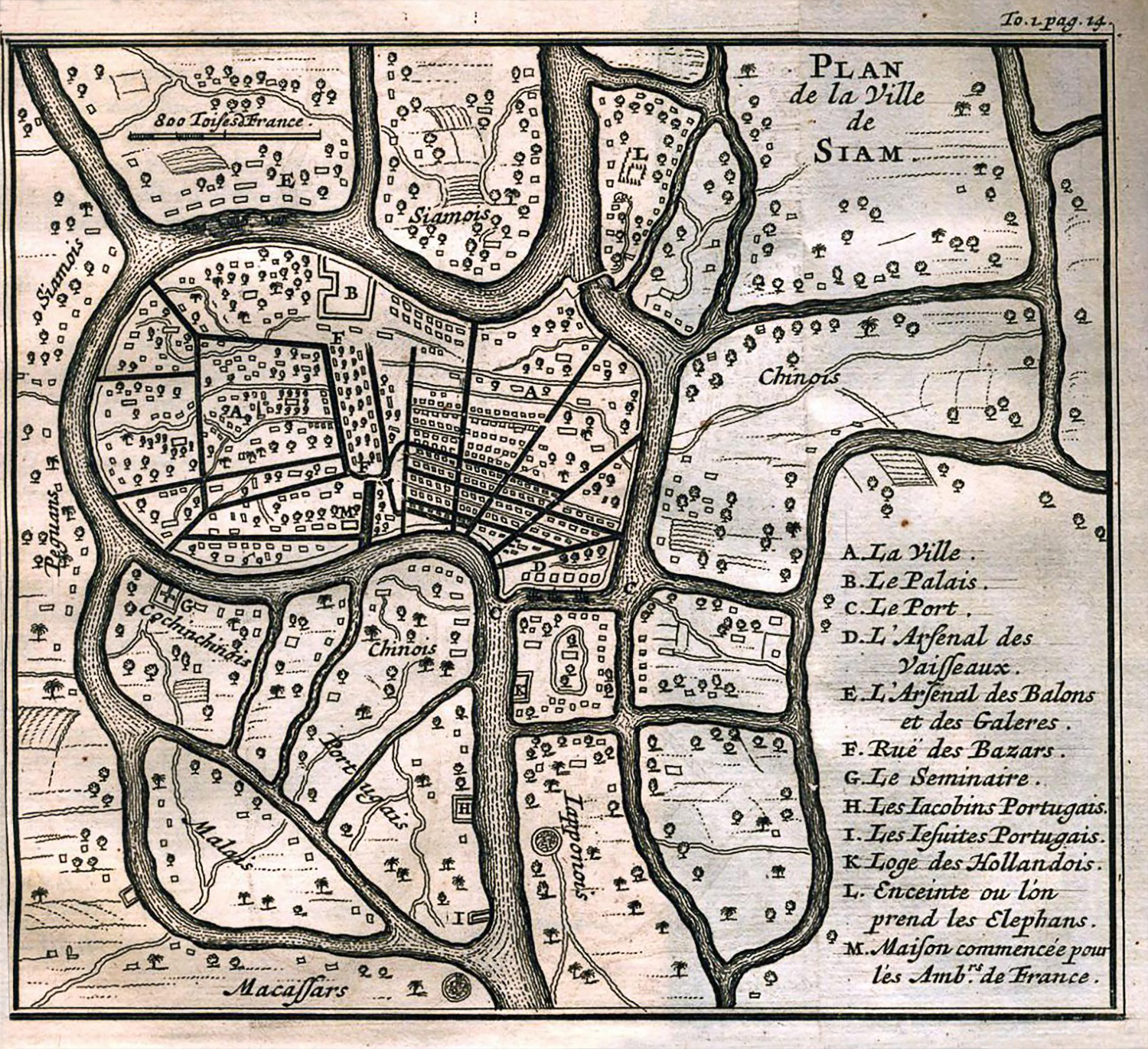
The Japanese quarter in Ayutthaya is indicated at the bottom center ("Japonois") of the map.

The Japanese quarters of Ayutthaya were home to about 1,500 Japanese inhabitants (some estimates run as high as 7,000). The community was called Ban Yipun in Thai, and was headed by a Japanese chief nominated by Thai authorities. It seems to have been a combination of traders, Christian converts ("Kirishitan") who had fled their home country to various Southeast Asian countries following the persecutions of Toyotomi Hideyoshi and Tokugawa Ieyasu, and unemployed former samurai who had been on the losing side at the battle of Sekigahara.

Padre António Francisco Cardim recounted having administered sacrament to around 400 Japanese Christians in 1627 in the Thai capital of Ayuthaya ("a 400 japoes christaos") There were also Japanese communities in Ligor and Patani.

The Japanese colony was highly valued for its military expertise, and was organized under a "Department of Japanese Volunteers" (Krom Asa Yipun) by the Thai king.

Contacts with other communities were not always smooth: in 1614, men of the English East India Company killed eight Japanese in a fight in the city of Ayutthaya.

== Yamada Nagamasa (1612–1630) ==
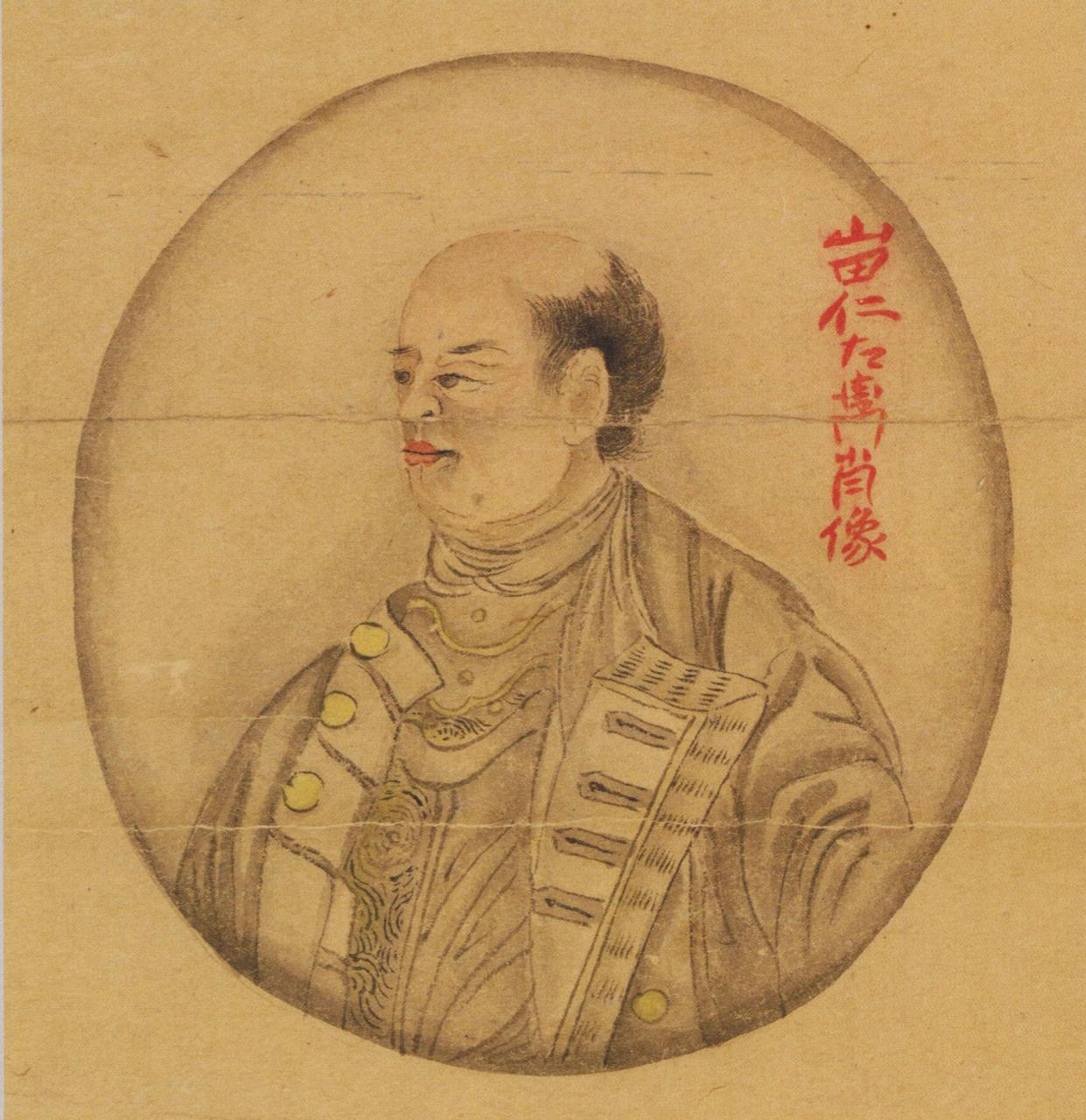
Portrait of Yamada Nagamasa c.1630.

A Japanese adventurer, Yamada Nagamasa, became very influential and ruled part of the kingdom of Siam (Thailand) during that period. He settled in the kingdom of Ayutthaya (modern-day Thailand) from around 1612 and became the ruler of the Nakhon Si Thammarat province in southern Thailand.

== William Adams (1614 and 1615) ==
William Adams traded between Japan and Southeast Asia, including Siam.

The English adventurer William Adams (1564–1620) who was based in Japan, led several trading ventures between Japan and Siam.

== Tenjiku Tokubei (1627–1630) ==
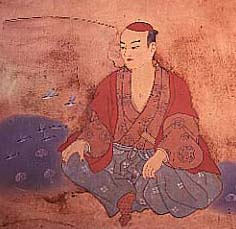
Tenjiku Tokubei, 17th-century painting.

The Japanese adventurer and writer Tenjiku Tokubei (1612 – c. 1692) (Jp:天竺徳兵衛) visited China, Vietnam and Siam on board a Japanese Red Seal ship. Tokubei would stay for some time in Siam and again visit the country on board one of the ships of the Dutch adventurer Jan Joosten van Lodensteijn and returned with great wealth and numerous stories to tell.

== Limitation of relations between Siam and Japan ==
Following Yamada's death in 1630, the new ruler and usurper king of Siam Prasat Thong (1630–1655) sent an army of 4000 soldiers to destroy the Japanese settlement in Ayutthaya, but many Japanese managed to flee to Cambodia. A few years later in 1633, returnees from Indochina were able to re-establish the Japanese settlement in Ayutthaya (300–400 Japanese).

From 1634, the shōgun, informed of these troubles and what he perceived as attacks on his authority, refused to issue further Red Seal ship permits for Siam. Desirous to renew trade however, the king of Siam sent a trading ship and an embassy to Japan in 1636, but the embassies were rejected by the shōgun. Japan was concomitantly closing itself to the world at that time, essentially to protect itself from Christianity, initiating the "Closed Country", or Sakoku, period. The Dutch took over a large part of the lucrative Siam-Japan trade from that time on.

=== Continuing trade ===
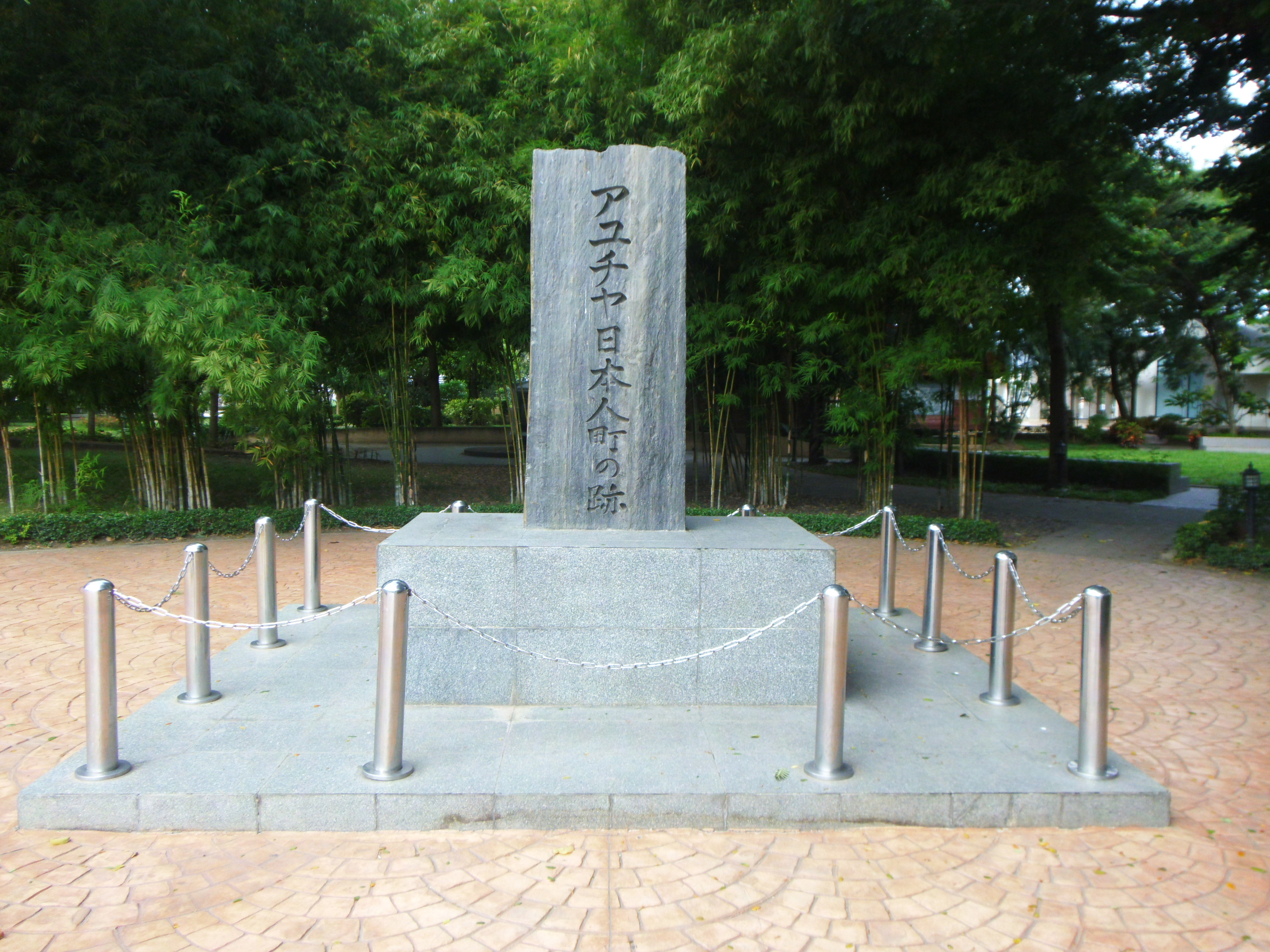
Plaque at the Japanese Village Museum in Ayutthaya

More embassies would be sent by Thailand to Japan, in 1656 during the reign of King Chaiyaracha and in 1687 during the reign of King Narai. Although Japan was closing itself to trade (especially with Western countries, except for the Dutch Republic), many Siamese junks continued to visit Japan: between 1647 and 1700 the arrival of around 130 Siamese ships was recorded in Nagasaki. During the reign of Petracha as many as 30 junks are recorded to have left Ayutthaya for Nagasaki, Japan. From 1715, only one Siamese junk per year was allowed, but this was not insignificant compared to what other countries could trade with Japan.

=== Remaining Japanese communities in Siam ===
Japanese communities however remained in Siam, and numerous refugees from the persecutions of Christians in Japan also arrived in the country after the promulgation of Ieyasu's interdiction of Christianity in Japan in 1614. The famous Maria Guyomar de Pinha, wife of the Greek adventurer Constantine Phaulkon, who became one of the most influential men in Siam in the end of the 17th century, was half-Japanese. In the second half of the 17th century, the French catholic missionaries in Siam cared for Annamite Christians and Japanese Christian communities in Siam.

Since the Tokugawa shogunate prohibited Japanese people established abroad to return to Japan, essentially as a protective measure against Christianity, the Japanese communities in Siam were gradually absorbed locally.

== Resumption of contacts (19th century) ==
Relations resumed in the 19th century, with the establishment of the Declaration of Amity and Commerce between Japan and Siam on 26 September 1887, during the reigns of two icons of modernization, king Chulalongkorn in Siam and Emperor Meiji in Japan.

Numerous Japanese experts were dispatched to Thailand to help modernize the country, in areas such as law, education and sericulture.

== World War II: occupation and alliance ==
Siam was allied with Japan during World War II, following numerous pre-war diplomatic exchanges and the beginning of a Japanese invasion of Thailand.

The Japanese had won from Phibun a secret verbal promise to support them in an attack on Malaya and Burma. However, the Thai Prime Minister was fickle and he was quite ready to forget this promise if circumstances changed. His government also asked both the British and Americans for guarantees of effective support if Thailand were invaded by Japan.

On 8 December 1941, the Japanese invasion of Thailand started at the same time as they invaded Malaya. The Japanese landed about 2,000 troops near Bangkok, and also made landings at Songkla and Prachuab (leading to the Battle of Prachuab Khirikhan). Thai troops initially opposed the Japanese invasion, but five hours after it received the Japanese ultimatum, the Thai cabinet ordered Thai troops to stop firing.

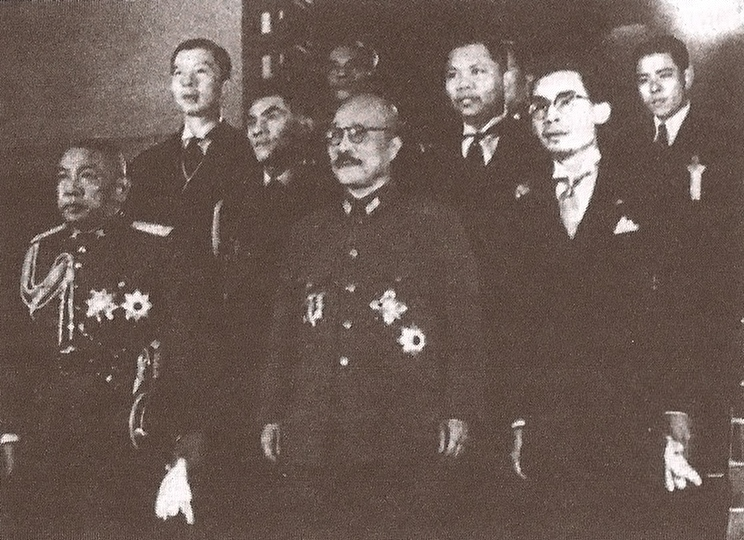
Phraya Phahonphonphayuhasena (far left) with Hideki Tōjō (center) in Tokyo 1942

A Treaty of alliance was signed between Thailand and Japan on December 21, 1941, and on January 25, 1942 Thailand declared war on the United States and Great Britain But Pridi Phanomyong acting as Regent for the absent King Ananda Mahidol refused to sign the declaration and the Thai ambassador to Washington, Seni Pramoj, refused to deliver it. Seni organized the Seri Thai resistance movement, under direction of Pridi in the regency office. The Japanese then proceeded to invade next door Malaya and Singapore, both of which were British colonies. Thailand helped Japanese forces launch strikes against them.

Meanwhile, Japan stationed 150,000 troops on Thai soil. As the war dragged on, the Japanese increasingly dealt with Thailand as a conquered territory rather than as an ally. Though the United States had not officially declared war, on 26 December 1942, US Tenth Air Force bombers based in India launched the first major bombing raid that damaged Bangkok and other targets and caused several thousand casualties. Public opinion and, even more important, the sympathies of the civilian political elite, moved perceptibly against Phibun's alliance with Japan. By March 1944, Phibun was making arrangements with the Chinese Chungking Army in Yunnan to fight against the losing Japanese.

== Modern times ==
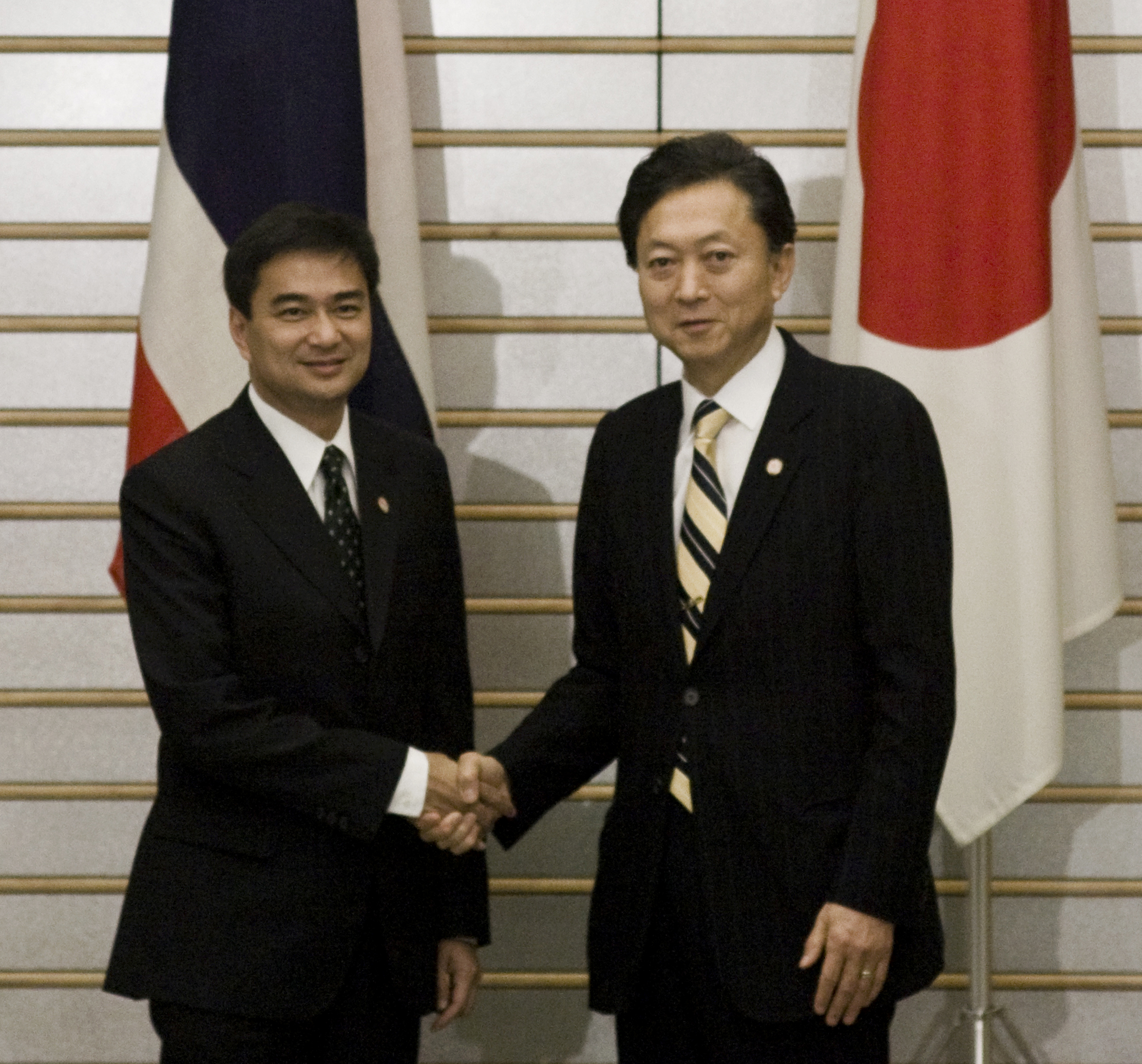
Abhisit Vejjajiva, Prime Minister of Thailand, with Yukio Hatoyama, Prime Minister of Japan, in 2009.

Japan has become again a key trading partner and foreign investor for Thailand. Japan is Thailand's largest supplier, followed by the United States. Since 2005, the rapid ramp-up in export of automobiles of Japanese makes (esp. Toyota, Nissan, Isuzu) has helped to dramatically improve the trade balance, with over 1 million cars produced last year. As such, Thailand has joined the ranks of the world's top ten automobile exporting nations.

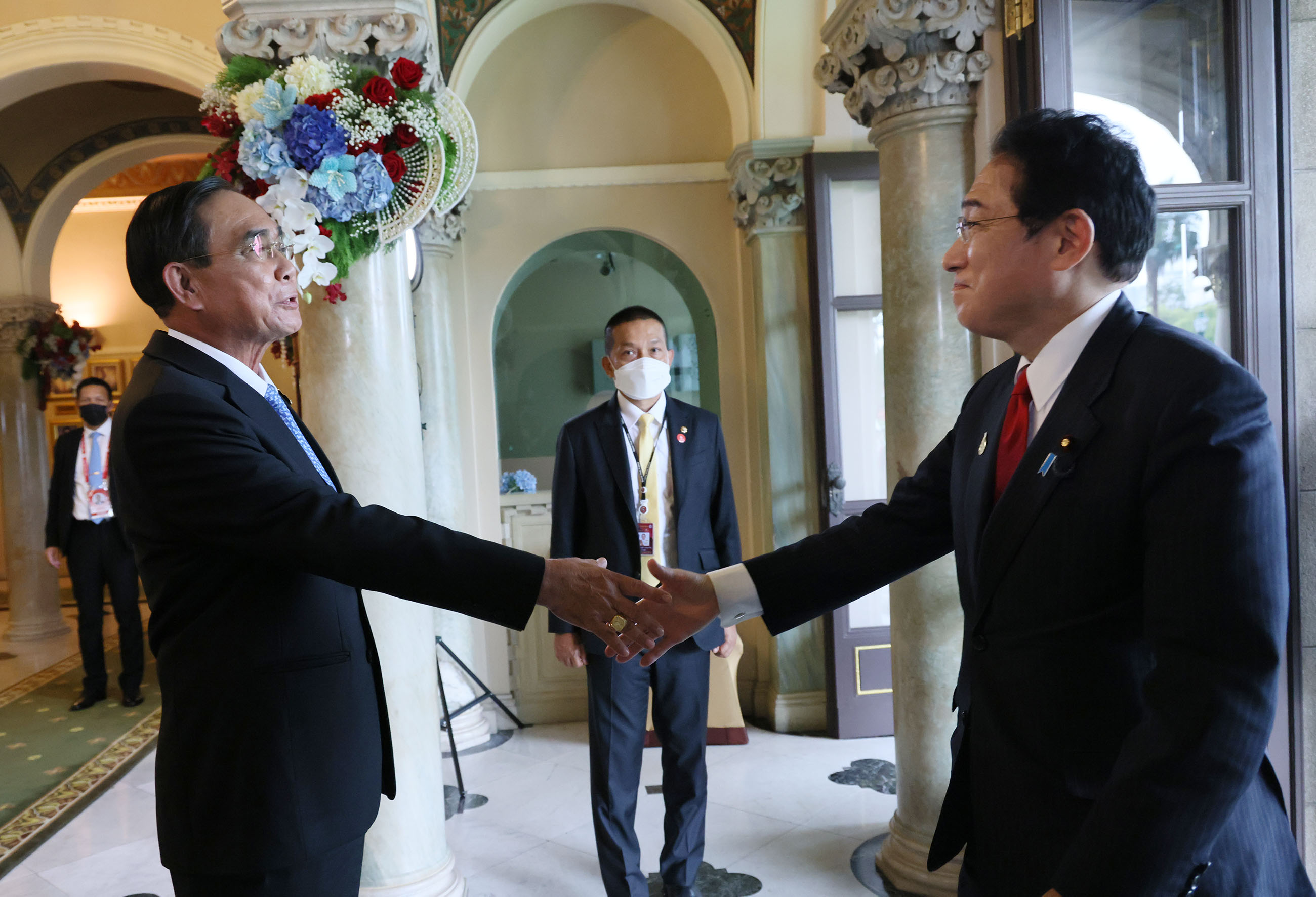
Prayut Chan-o-cha, Prime Minister of Thailand welcoming Fumio Kishida, Prime Minister of Japan to the Government House of Thailand during the APEC Thailand 2022 summit.

In 2007, a Japan-Thailand Economic Partnership Agreement was signed, aiming at free trade between the two countries after a transition period of 10 years. In diasporic populations, there are around 80,000 Japanese people living in Thailand, and 60,000 Thai people living in Japan.

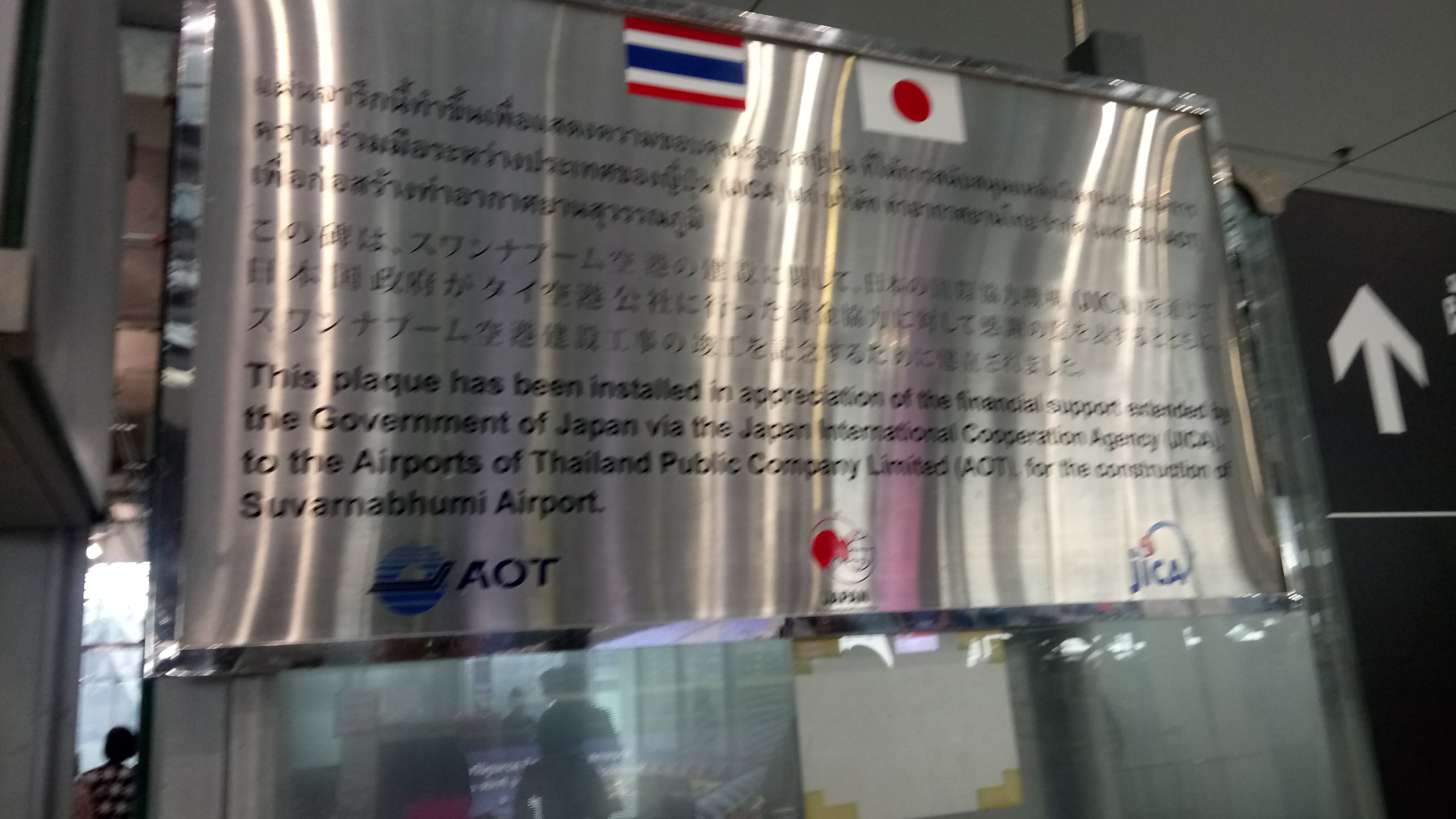
Plaque at Suvarnabhumi Airport

== See also ==
- Japanese language education in Thailand
- List of Ambassadors of Japan to Thailand
- Japan–Thailand Economic Partnership Agreement
- Japanese migration to Thailand
- Thais in Japan
