= Thais in Japan =

Thais in Japan คนไทยในญี่ปุ่น
在日タイ人 Zainichi Taijin
- (Thailand) (Japan)

Total population
- 67,097 (in December, 2025)

Languages
- Thai, Isan, Japanese

Religion
- Buddhism

Thais in Japan consist of Thai migrants that come to Japan, as well as their descendants. In December 2025, there were 67,097 Thais living in Japan.

== History ==
There were some contacts between the Ryūkyū Kingdom and the Ayutthaya Kingdom which dates far as the 15th century. Some trade between the two countries were successfully done during the 17th century, as the Japanese community in Ayutthaya began. However, when Japan made a policy of sakoku in 1639, the Japanese community began to fade out. In 1887, Japan and Siam began a new history with the Declaration of Amity and Commerce.

== Business and employment ==
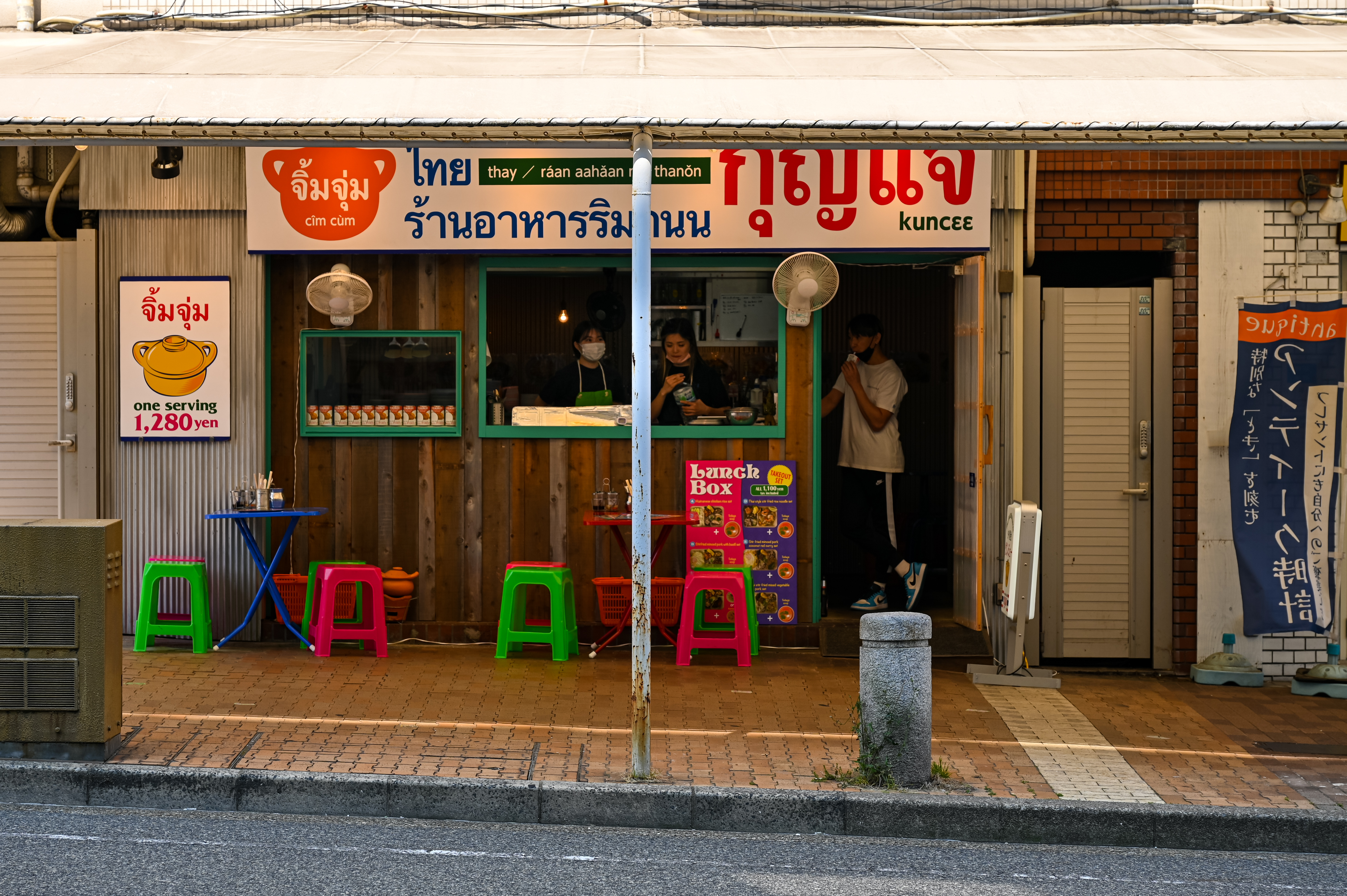
Thai restaurant in Kobe

Some Thais in Japan run used car export businesses. This trend was believed to have begun in the late 1970s, when one Thai working in Japan sent a car back to his homeland. The potential for doing business in used cars also attracted more Thais to come to Japan in the 1990s.

== Notable Thai Temples in Japan ==
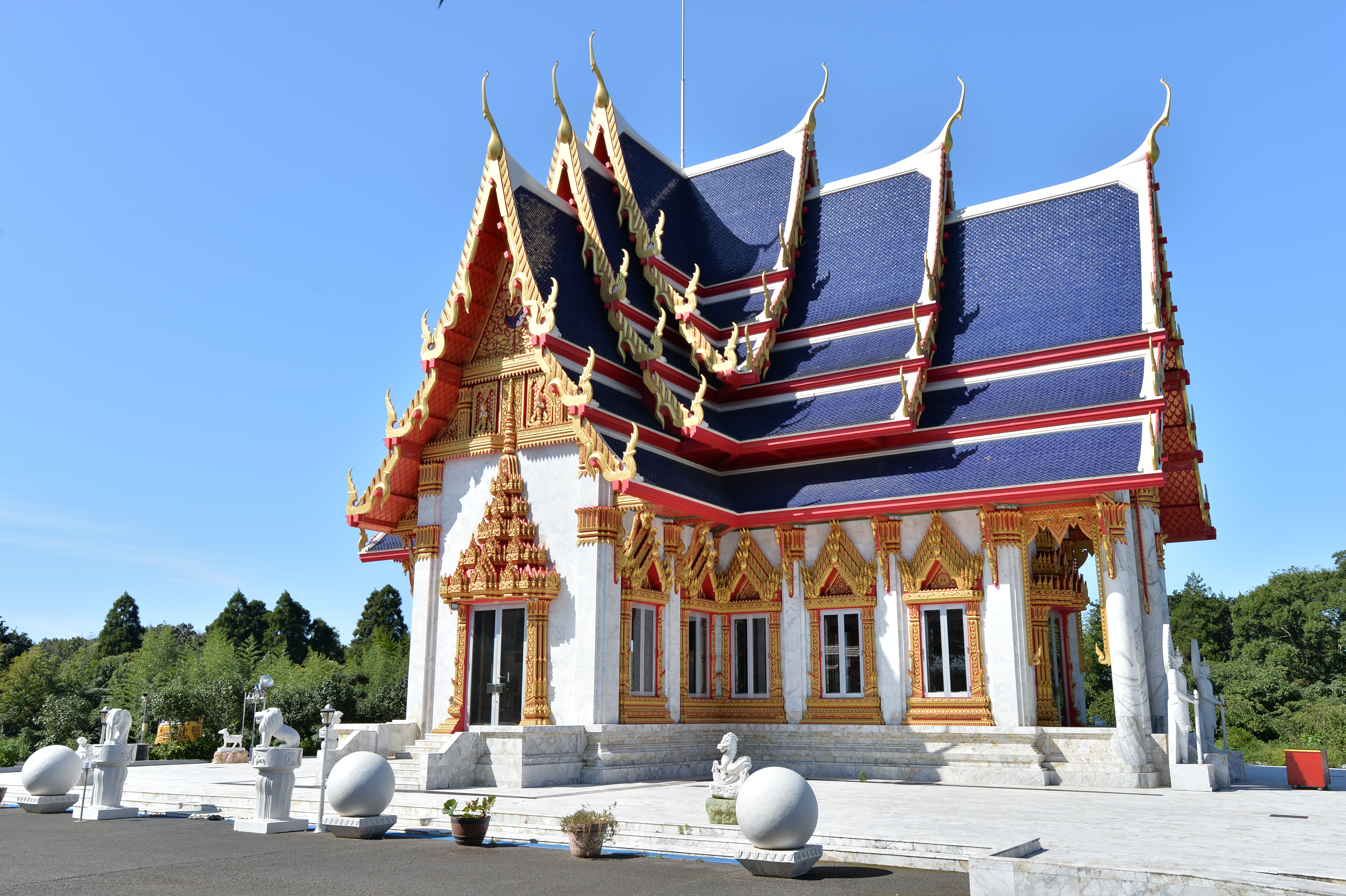
Wat Paknam Japan in Narita, Chiba

- Wat Paknam Japan
- Wat Buddharangsi Tokyo
- Wat Phra Dhammakaya Osaka

== Notable people ==
- Bunshiri, television personality (Thai, lives in Japan)
- Kanita Matsuo, radio speaker (Thai, lives in Japan)
- Manami Oda, gyaru model (Thai parent)
- Eri Otoguro, actress (Thai parent)
- Shōta Kaito, sumō wrestler (Thai mother)
- Yurina Katō, tarento (Thai mother)
- Soya Kurokawa, actor (Thai father)
- Arisa Kotoi, idol (Thai/Japanese mother, raised in Japan)
- Tsubasa Sakakibara, baseball player (Thai mother, raised in Japan)
- Yasuo Sano, baseball player (Thai mother)
- Maki Shima, fashion model (Thai mother)
- Krissada Heebthong, baseball player (Thai mother)
- Hitomi Suzuki, idol (Thai mother)
- Masato Seto, photographer (Vietnamese-Thai mother)
- Mina Tanaka, soccer player (Thai mother)
- Chanana Sarina, fashion model (Thai mother)
- Kōji Mukai, television personality and member of male idol group Snow Man (Thai mother)
- Hiroki Yamada, baseball player (Thai mother)
- Amnaj Khaokhrueamuang, tourism scholar (Thai, lives in Japan)
- Attakarn Wongchanamas, diplomat (Thai, lives in Japan)
- Yokthai Sithoar, muay thai player (Thai, lives in Japan)
- Sorut Sukthaworn, diplomat (Thai, lives in Japan)
- Chanathip Songkrasin, soccer player (Thai, lives in Japan)
- Krit Tankanarat, diplomat (Thai, lived in Japan)
- Vichit Chitvimarn, diplomat (Thai, lived in Japan)
- Pavin Chatchawanpongpun, diplomat (Thai, lives in Japan)
- Chutong Weerasakreck, muay thai player (Thai, lives in Japan)
- Teerasil Dangda, soccer player (Thai, lived in Japan)
- Thitiphan Puangchan, soccer player (Thai, lived in Japan)
- Theerathorn Bunmathan, soccer player (Thai, lived in Japan)

=== In fiction ===
- Apachai Hopachai, in the anime series Kenichi: The Mightiest Disciple
- Charunee Kusakabe, in the anime series Heaven's Memo Pad
- Phichit Chulanont, in the anime series Yuri on Ice

== See also ==
- Japan–Thailand relations
- Thai diaspora
- Immigration to Japan
- Japanese migration to Thailand
