= Beppu (surname) =

Beppu (written: 別府) is a Japanese family name. Notable persons with this name include:

- Ayumi Beppu (別府 あゆみ, born 1983), Japanese actress and tarento
- Francine Beppu (born 1982), American television personality and entrepreneur
- Fumiyuki Beppu (別府 史之, born 1983), Japanese professional cyclist
- Beppu Shinsuke (別府 晋介, 1847–1877), Japanese samurai
- Setsuya Beppu (別府 節弥, 1904 - 1992), Japanese diplomat
- Takumi Beppu (別府 匠, born 1979), Japanese cyclist, brother of Fumiyuki Beppu

== Fictional Characters ==
- Johnny Bepp (Beppu) (ジョニー別府), fictional character from the anime Aikatsu!

== See also ==
- Beppu (disambiguation)
