= Japanese migration to Thailand =

Japanese people in Thailand
- (Japan) (Thailand)
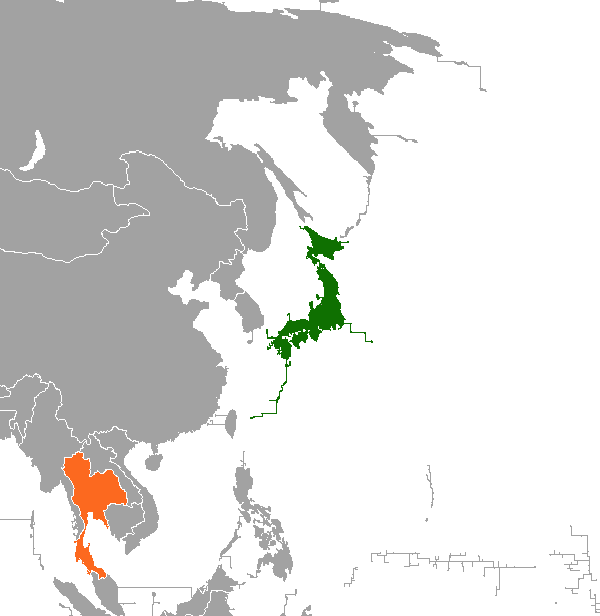

Total population
- 78,431 (October 2022)

Regions with significant populations
- Bangkok: 59,744
- Chonburi: 7,184
- Chiang Mai: 2,489
- Pathum Thani: 1,211
- Samut Prakan: 1,130
- Ayutthaya: 1,117
- Prachinburi: 763
- Phuket: 715

Languages
- Japanese · Thai

Religion
- Buddhism · Shinto · Taoism · Chinese folk religion

Related ethnic groups
- Japanese people · Japanese diaspora

Japanese migration to Thailand has a long history and in recent years has grown. As of 2021, the Ministry of Foreign Affairs reports that Thailand has the fourth highest number of Japanese expatriates in the world after the United States, China and Australia. Bangkok, the home of two-thirds of all the registered Japanese residents in Thailand, has the second-largest Japanese expatriate population of any city in the world outside Japan, behind only Los Angeles. Japanese residents themselves suspect that their actual population number may be several times higher than the official figures, because many transient residents, especially those on long-term tourist visas, fail to register with Japanese consulates.

== Migration history ==
=== 16th and 17th century ===
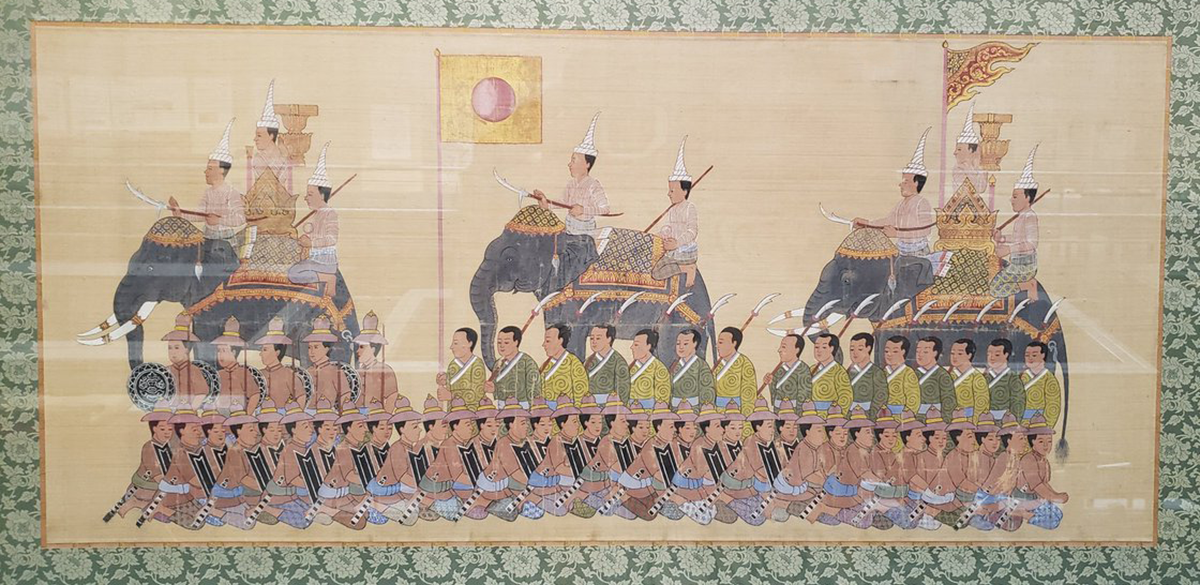
Yamada Nagamasa's army in Siam. 17th century painting

From the 1580s to the 1630s, a Japanese community of traders, mercenaries, and Catholic exiles thrived in the Ayutthaya Kingdom's capital Ayutthaya. They arrived primarily on the red seal ships which controlled trade between Japan and Siam. By 1620, the Japanese district in the city's southeast, on the east bank of the Chao Phraya River, numbered between 1,000 and 1,500 inhabitants, making it the second-largest Japanese community abroad, behind that in Manila. La Loubère, a French diplomat from the court of Louis XIV, recorded that the royal house of Ayutthaya employed 600 Japanese samurais as the royal guard corps. This tradition lasted until the reign of King Prasat Thong. One of its members, Yamada Nagamasa, rose to prominence as a military advisor to King Songtham, attaining the rank opra. In 1630 Sri Voravong (later known as King Prasat Thong) sent him to put down a rebellion at Ligor (today Nakhon Si Thammarat). He was wounded in the battle, and then poisoned by an emissary sent by Prasat Thong. After Yamada's death, Prasat Thong attacked the Japanese settlement at Ayutthaya and drove out its inhabitants. Most were killed, while some, along with the survivors of Yamada's army at Ligor, fled to Cambodia. Upon hearing the news, Tokugawa Iemitsu, then shogun of Japan, cut off relations with Siam.

A few of the Japanese were able to return to their homeland, but with the hardening of Japan's sakoku policy most found themselves in permanent exile. Prasat Thong tried to re-establish trade with Japan, and invited some Japanese to return to Ayutthaya. By 1637 there were perhaps 300 living there. However, Japan continued to refuse all Ayutthaya ships permission to call at port, reserving this privilege for Chinese and Dutch ships. The Japanese immigrants do not appear to have brought any women or children with them (though some scholars suspect that the Catholics among them may have brought families); in any case, most seem to have intermarried with local women, and over the generations their descendants melted into the society.

=== Nineteenth and early-20th centuries ===
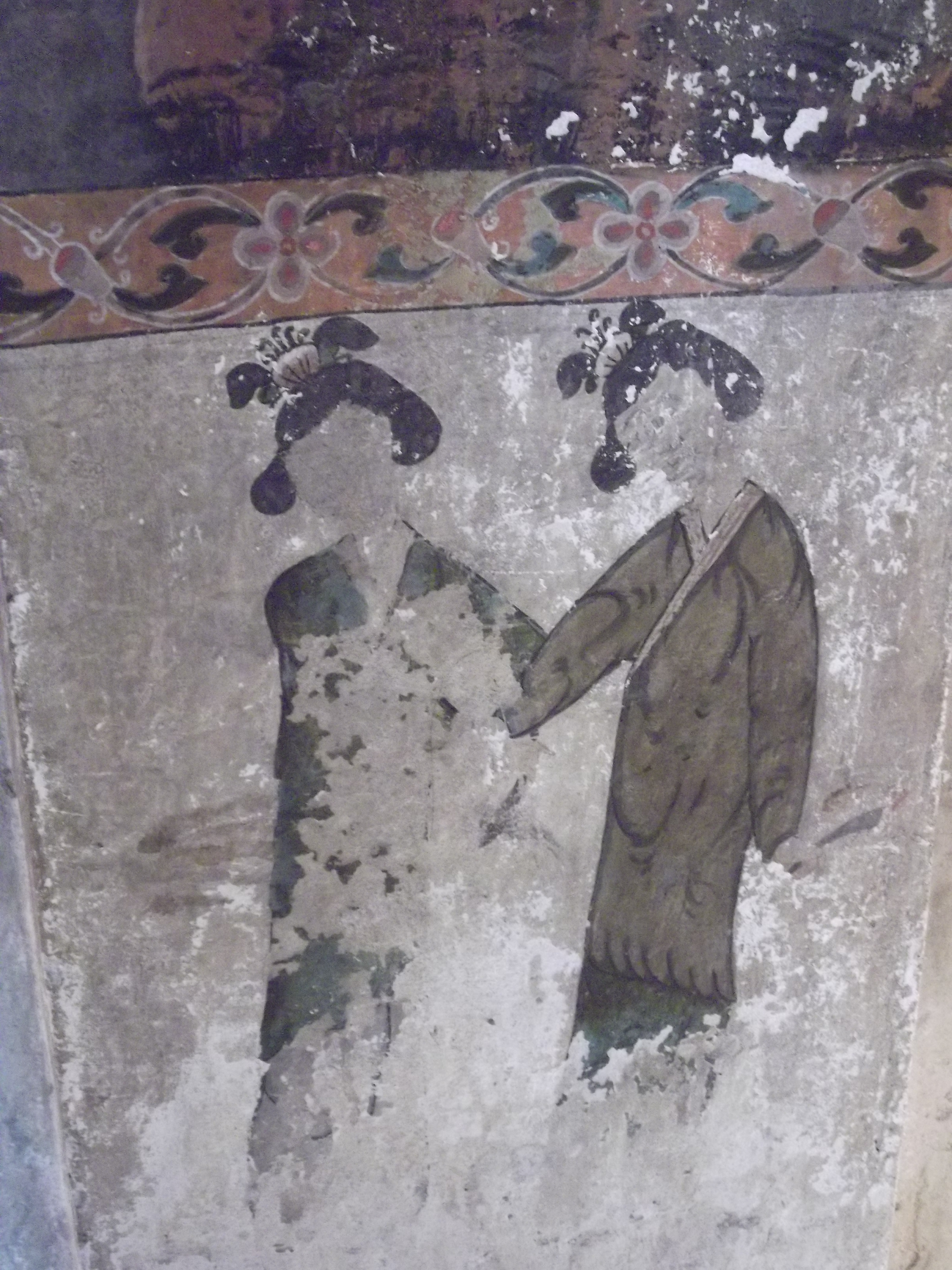
Japanese girls in Siam. early 19th century painting in Ratchaburana Temple, Phitsanulok

After the Declaration of Amity and Commerce between Japan and Siam in 1887, Japanese people slowly began coming to Siam again. In 1894, it was reported that the governments of Japan and Siam were negotiating the possible settlement in Siam of migrants from Japan who would develop virgin land for agriculture. The project saw little success. By 1896 there were perhaps between 30 and 50 Japanese living in Bangkok, and none in the provinces. Up until 1897, the Japanese were under French protection, but that year a Japanese legation was established at Bangkok, with Inagaki Manjiro as its minister. Japan and Siam signed a treaty in 1898, whereby Japanese in Siam were granted extraterritoriality, but only until the passage of a Siamese criminal code. By 1913, there were 219 Japanese in Siam (157 males, 62 females) registered with the consulate. By 1902, observers had noted a trend of increasing Japanese employment as advisors in the government of Siam. These included experts in fields such as law, education, and sericulture. The men of the community tended to be educated and skilled, not mere labourers. Their women were mostly prostitutes or ex-prostitutes, sometimes known as karayuki-san. Among the Japanese subjects in Siam were a few Koreans and Taiwanese. There was some confusion over the nationality of the latter, whether they should be treated as overseas Chinese like the other Thai Chinese, or be entitled to receive consular protection as Japanese nationals.

After the start of the Second Sino-Japanese War in 1937, the Chinese merchant community engaged in a surprisingly violent boycott of Japanese goods. As relations between Japan and the United Kingdom deteriorated, Japanese expatriates in Singapore and other British territories resettled in Siam to avoid potential internment. The 1941 Japanese invasion and occupation of Thailand brought many more Japanese to the country. After the war ended, the British military authorities repatriated them all to Japan, including the civilians, unless they could prove that they had been long-term residents of the country. Repatriation efforts were held up by war crimes prosecutions. By September 1946, still about one-sixth of the Japanese who had been in Southeast Asia at the war's end remained there, including about 9,500 Japanese in Siam.

Japanese nationals living in Thailand (1955–2015)
Year	2015	2010	2005	2000	1995	1990	1985	1980	1975	1970	1960	1955
Number of people	67,424	47,251	36,327	21,154	21,745	14,289	7,852	6,424	5,952	3,216	673	379

== Settlement ==
There is a large community of Japanese in Thailand, consisting largely of expatriate top-level managers, professionals, and their families, as well as Japanese students at International schools and universities, including the extended stay Japanese travellers. Most Japanese expatriates live in Greater Bangkok, Chonburi, and Chiang Mai.

- In Bangkok a notable Japanese population numbering around 60,000 lives in and around Sukhumvit Road area, Thong Lo, Soi Thaniya, Ekkamai, and Phrompong.
- In Sriracha a Japanese population lives in and around the city center as the second largest Japanese community outside Bangkok.
- In Chiang Mai a Japanese population lives near the city center.
- In Ayutthaya a growing number of Japanese returns and lives in and around Rojana Road close to the many Japanese companies. The city is known as the place of the first Japanese quarter in Thailand, dating back to the 16th century.

== Business and employment ==
After the establishment of relations between Japan and Siam in 1898, the Siamese government invited 15 Japanese sericulture experts to develop the country's silk exports. They were assigned to the Isan region. Though it was a success in building up relations between Japan and Siam, leading to the establishment of Kasetsart University, it failed to increase silk production. Beginning in 1909, official support from both sides for the project began to wane, and in 1913, after outbreaks of silkworm diseases, funding was cut off.

In the 1980s, most Japanese in Thailand were sent there as expatriates by large Japanese corporations or government organizations. Only a small proportion were individual business people or entrepreneurs. A Japanese Ministry of Foreign Affairs survey in 1989 showed that of 2,392 Japanese work-permit holders in Thailand, 1,046 were managers, 444 were engineers, 292 were specialists, 184 were production inspectors, and 139 were commercial managers. In total, the Japanese government statistics showed 10,579 Japanese people staying in Thailand, of whom 9,525 were in Bangkok. They occupied the upper end of the economic spectrum, earning salaries ranging from six to twelve times higher than the average Thai corporate worker.

In a more recent trend, an increasing number of Japanese expatriates in Thailand consist of young people working in Japanese contact centres and other business process outsourcing firms providing Japanese-language services. Though their pay is less than half what they might earn in Japan, by living in Thailand they can take advantage of the country's relatively low cost of living. They also avoid many of the social pressures associated with corporate employment in Japan. Their employers, for their part, prefer to hire Japanese workers rather than locals to avoid cultural misunderstandings, and because they believe their clients in Japan would not accept dealing with Thai people who speak Japanese as a second language.

== Health care ==
A 2001 study of 4,315 Japanese patients at Ram Hospital in Chiang Mai found that the most common health complaints (classified according to ICD-10 coding) involved respiratory diseases (739 cases), digestive tract diseases, and infectious diseases. The authors noted that adult Japanese tended only to visit hospitals in case of acute diseases. The authors offered health consultations to Japanese expatriates living in the city, and found many suffering from chronic diseases.

A 2005 study of Japanese patients at Bangkok Hospital (11,200 patients, about one-eighth of all non-Thai patients at the hospital that year) found that most patients were men in their 30s, 40s, and 50s. Females and patients in their 20s were notably fewer. Focusing just on the patients who were actually resident in Thailand, as opposed to travellers, their health complaints showed a number of dissimilarities with local Thai patients. Again according to ICD-10 coding, "certain infectious and parasitic diseases" were uncommon among Japanese patients and common among Thai patients, while "diseases of the musculoskeletal system and connective tissue" showed the opposite. Comparing Japanese expatriate patients in Thailand to patients in Japan found that "endocrine, nutritional, and metabolic diseases" and "mental and behavioral disorders" were diagnosed less frequently among the former group, while "diseases of the respiratory system" and "certain infectious and parasitic diseases" were more frequent among the former group.

== Education ==
Locations of Japanese schools, day and weekend, in Thailand approved by MEXT (grey dots represent closed schools)

Japanese international schools (for Japanese children, both nihonjin gakko):

- Thai-Japanese Association School, located in Huai Khwang District, Bangkok.
- Thai-Japanese Association School (Sriracha), located in Si Racha District, Chonburi.

Supplementary programmes for Japanese children:

- Chiangmai Japanese Supplement School (チェンマイ補習授業校, Chenmai Hoshū Jugyō Kō), located in Chiang Mai City.
- Phuket Japanese Supplement School (プーケット補習授業校, Pūketto Hoshū Jugyō Kō), located in Phuket City.
- Formerly the Sriracha-Pattaya Japanese Supplement School

Thai-Japanese educational institutions:

- Thai-Nichi Institute of Technology, located in Suan Luang District, Bangkok
- Yanagawa Junior High School (Thai: โรงเรียนมัธยมยานากาวา; Japanese: 柳川高等学校附属タイ中学校), located in Nakhon Si Thammarat City.
- Waseda Japanese Language and Culture School, located in Sathon District, Bangkok.
- Waseda Japanese Language and Culture School, located in Chiang Mai City
- Waseda International Cultural Center, located in Si Racha District, Chonburi.

Closed day school:

- Josuikan Bangkok International School (shiritsu zaigai kyoiku shisetsu), located in Min Buri District, Bangkok. Closed permanently on 31 March 2024.

== Culture ==
One of the most widely read Japanese expatriate publications in Thailand is DACO magazine. It was started in 1998 by Mikio Numadate, an Aomori native and resident of Thailand since 1986. It is distributed for free, often in ramen shops along Sukhumvit Road which attract a primarily Japanese clientele. He also started a Thai-language version of DACO in 2003 to introduce Japanese culture to people in Thailand. J-Channel FM 93.75, a 24-hour Bangkok-based radio station, also broadcasts in Japanese roughly 30 percent of the time since 2004. It has many bilingual DJs of mixed Thai and Japanese ethnicity, and much of the Japanese content, especially J-pop, also finds listeners among local Thai people.

A number of Japanese and Thai books and films contain portrayals of Thailand's Japanese community. Thommayanti's novel Khu Kam depicts a Thai woman's relationship with an Imperial Japanese Army officer during the Japanese occupation of Thailand. It was adapted numerous times for television and film, including in 1996 as Sunset at Chaophraya. A more recent tale is Hitonari Tsuji's novel Sayonara Itsuka, the story of an affair of a Japanese woman in Thailand and a married Japanese salaryman, which was also adapted for film in 2010. Ayutthaya's Japanese community was portrayed in the 2010 Thai film Yamada: The Samurai of Ayothaya, starring Seigi Ozeki and Buakaw Por. Pramuk. A Thai fictional work on the subject of Japanese prostitutes, The memoir of Keiko Karayuki-san in Siam, had its English translation published in 2003.

Thai culture has significant connections to Japanese culture in terms of cuisine, customs, and traditions. Thailand is also a strongly Japanophilic country as cuisine, fashion and lifestyle has been sharply influenced by Japanese immigration. The Thai populace has openly embraced Japanese products, as evidenced by the huge popularity of Japanese food, fashion, television shows, music, video games and anime. Thailand is the largest ASEAN importer of Japanese food. The number of Japanese restaurants in Thailand has risen from 1,803 in 2013 to 3,004 in 2018. Only four of Thailand's 76 provinces lack a Japanese restaurant.

== Notable people ==
- Chatri Sityodtong (Japanese mother)
- Daiki Higuchi (Originally from Yatsushiro, Kumamoto)
- Goshi Okubo (Originally from Iwanuma, Miyagi)
- Hiromichi Katano (Originally from Funabashi, Chiba)
- Hironori Saruta (Originally from Ōtake, Hiroshima)
- Kazuki Murakami (Originally from Ehime, Japan)
- Kazuto Kushida (Originally from Kyoto, Japan)
- Maria Guyomar de Pinha (Japanese mother)
- Masahiro Fukasawa (Originally from Numazu, Shizuoka)
- Rina Izuta (Originally from Saitama Prefecture, Japan)
- Seiya Kojima (Originally from Nogi, Tochigi)
- Takeshi Miki (Originally from Mitaka, Tokyo)
- Yamada Nagamasa (Originally from Numazu, Shizuoka)
- Yuki Bamba (Originally from Omihachiman, Shiga)

== See also ==
- Nihonmachi
- Japan-Thailand relations
- Japanese language education in Thailand
- Thais in Japan

== Bibliography ==
- Chumpol, Prateep (2003), The memoir of Keiko Karayuki-san in Siam, translated by Chiradei Diskaprakai, Numfon Publishing, ISBN 978-974-688-294-1, OCLC 181382979
- 川島真 [Kawashima Makoto] (2011), 台湾人は「日本人」か？—十九世紀末在シャム華人の日本公使館登録・国籍取得問題 [Were Taiwanese people "Japanese"? Problems of registration and nationality acquisition among overseas Chinese in Siam in the late 19th century], in 貴志俊彦 [Kishi Toshihiko] [in Japanese] (ed.), 近代アジアの自画像と他者 [Self-portraits and others in modern Asia] (in Japanese), 京都大学学術出版会 [Kyoto University Press], ISBN 978-4-87698-550-0
- Polenghi, Cesare (2009), Samurai of Ayutthaya: Yamada Nagamasa, Japanese Warrior and Merchant in Early 17th Century Siam, Lotus Press, ISBN 978-974-480-147-0
- Sakai, Rie (2008), "Pattern of Outpatient Visits by Japanese Male Expatriates in Thailand", Journal of Occupational Health, 50 (2): 103–113, doi:10.1539/joh.l7072, PMID 18403860
- 柴山真琴 [Shibayama, Makoto] (1993), 1990 年前後のバンコク日本人学校通学児の社会化環境 : 海外子女教育理念との乖離の解消策はあるか [Socialization Environments for Japanese School Children Temporarily Residing in Bangkok in 1990: Are There Any Solutions to Fill a Gap between the Ideal of Overseas Education and Thai Realities?], Bulletin of Faculty of Education, University of Tokyo 東京大学教育学部紀要 (in Japanese), 33 (1): 211–220, archived from the original on 2016-03-04
- Sparrow, Gerald (1968), The great defenders, London: Long, ISBN 978-0-09-088720-0, OCLC 467663
- Swan, William L. (1986), Japanese economic activity in Siam: from the 1890s until the outbreak of the Pacific War, Centre for South East Asian Studies, OCLC 23595541
- Uchikoshi, Akira; Hamada, Atsuo; Iizuka, Takashi; Okuzawa, Hidekazu; Unachuk, Varphan; Thomas, Jacob; Basugi, Norihiko (2003), 発展途上国に滞在する日本人成人の受療疾患に関する検討 [Disease trends among Japanese expatriates living in Southeast Asia] (PDF), Japanese Journal of Occupational Medicine and Traumatology (in Japanese), 51 (6): 432–436, ISSN 1345-2592
- 吉川利治 [Yoshikawa Toshiharu] (1980), 「暹羅国蚕業顧問技師」 : 明治期の東南アジア技術援助 (PDF), 東南アジア研究 [Southeast Asian Studies] (in Japanese), 18 (3): 361–386
- Bangkok and Siam, directory, Straits Settlements and Siam: Bangkok Times Press, 1914
- タイ王国, 各国・地域情勢 (in Japanese), Tokyo: Ministry of Foreign Affairs, Japan, 2010
