= Japanese as a foreign language =

Japanese as a foreign language is studied by foreigners in Japan and non-native speakers worldwide, including those with Japanese ancestry. Many major universities throughout the world provide Japanese language courses, and a number of secondary and even primary schools worldwide offer courses in the language.

== History ==
International interest in the Japanese language dates from the 19th century but has become more prevalent following Japan's economic bubble of the 1980s and the global popularity of Japanese popular culture (such as anime and video games) since the 1990s. In 1940, only 65 Americans not of Japanese descent were able to read, write and understand the language. As of 2015, more than 3.6 million people studied the language worldwide, primarily in East and Southeast Asia. Nearly one million Chinese, 745,000 Indonesians, 556,000 South Koreans and 357,000 Australians studied Japanese in lower and higher educational institutions. Between 2012 and 2015, considerable growth of learners originated in Australia (20.5%), Thailand (34.1%), Vietnam (38.7%) and the Philippines (54.4%).

As of 2017, more than 267,000 foreign students study at Japanese universities and Japanese language schools, including 107,260 Chinese, 61,670 Vietnamese and 21,500 Nepalese. In addition, local governments and some NPO groups provide free Japanese language classes for foreign residents, including Japanese Brazilians and foreigners married to Japanese nationals. In the United Kingdom, study of the Japanese language is supported by the British Association for Japanese Studies. In Ireland, Japanese is offered as a language in the Leaving Certificate in some schools.

== Standardized tests ==
The Japanese government provides standardized tests to measure spoken and written comprehension of Japanese for second language learners; the most prominent is the Japanese Language Proficiency Test (JLPT), which features five levels of exams (changed from four levels in 2010), ranging from elementary (N5) to advanced (N1). The JLPT is offered twice a year. The Japanese External Trade Organization JETRO organizes the Business Japanese Proficiency Test which tests the learner's ability to understand Japanese in a business setting. The Japan Kanji Aptitude Testing Foundation, which took over the BJT from JETRO in 2009, announced in August 2010 that the test would be discontinued in 2011 due to financial pressures on the Foundation. However, it has since issued a statement to the effect that the test will continue to be available as a result of support from the Japanese government.

== See also ==
- Korean as a foreign language
- Chinese as a foreign language
