= Wat Paknam Japan =

Largest Thai Buddhist Temple in Japan

- วัดปากน้ำญี่ปุ่น
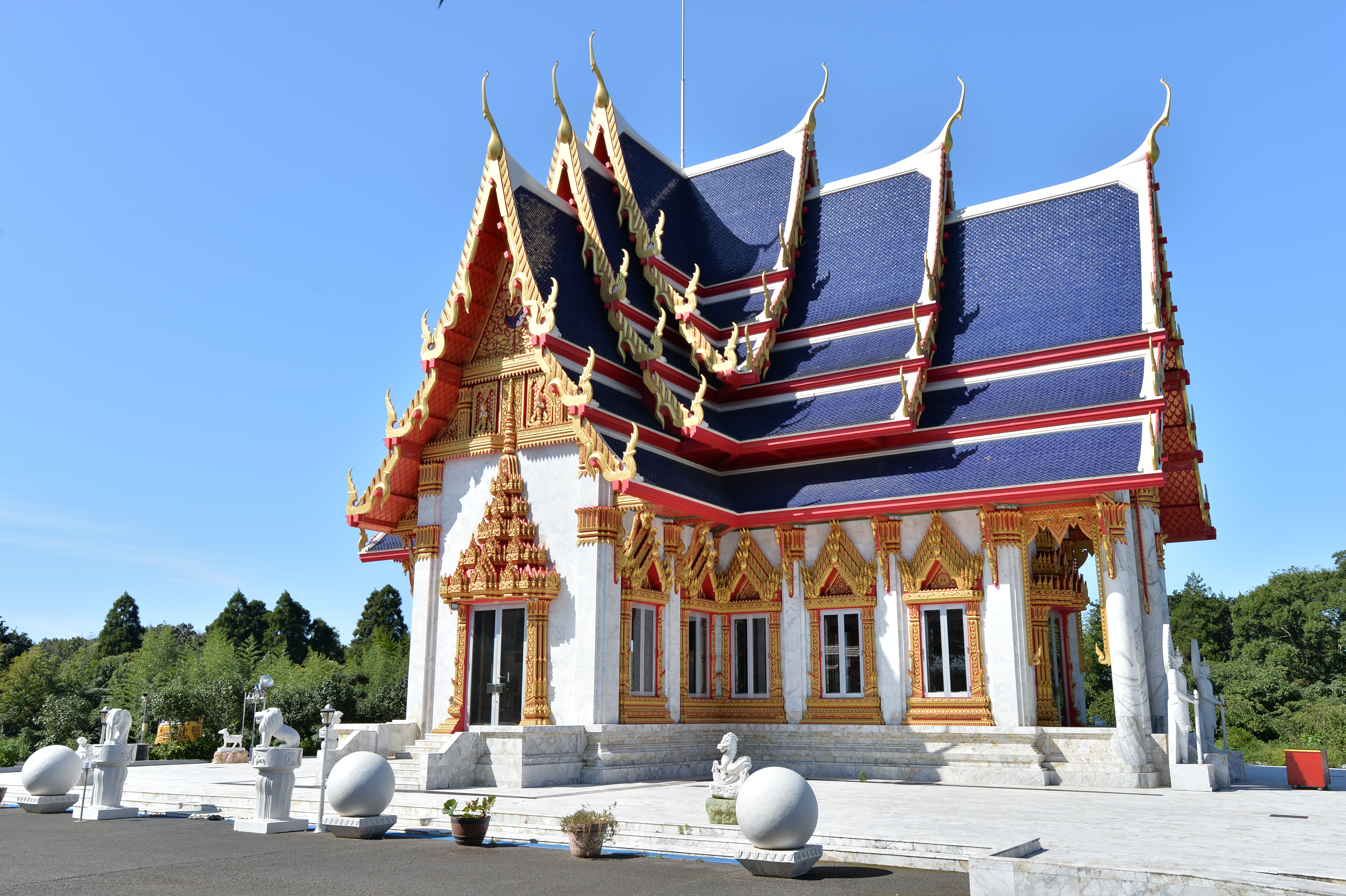
- Ubosot Hall

- Location within Japan

Religion
- Affiliation: Buddhist
- Sect: Theravāda

Location
- Location: 294-1 Nakano, Narita City, Chiba Prefecture
- Country: Japan
- Interactive map of Wat Paknam Japan
- Coordinates: 35.8471°N 140.3967°E

Architecture
- Type: Ubosot
- Completed: 2003

Website
- pakunamu.net

Wat Paknam Japan (Thai: วัดปากน้ำญี่ปุ่น; Japanese: ワットパクナム日本別院) is the largest Thai Buddhist temple ('Wat') in Japan, located in Narita City, Chiba Prefecture. It was founded in 1998 as a branch temple of Wat Paknam, a temple in Thailand, to serve as a spiritual center for residents of Thai descent.

Wat Paknam Japan has a vihāra and an ubosot built in authentic Thai style by carpenters invited from Thailand. Several times a year, thousands of Thai residents in Japan gather at the temple for festivals, during which Buddhist sermons and other events take place.

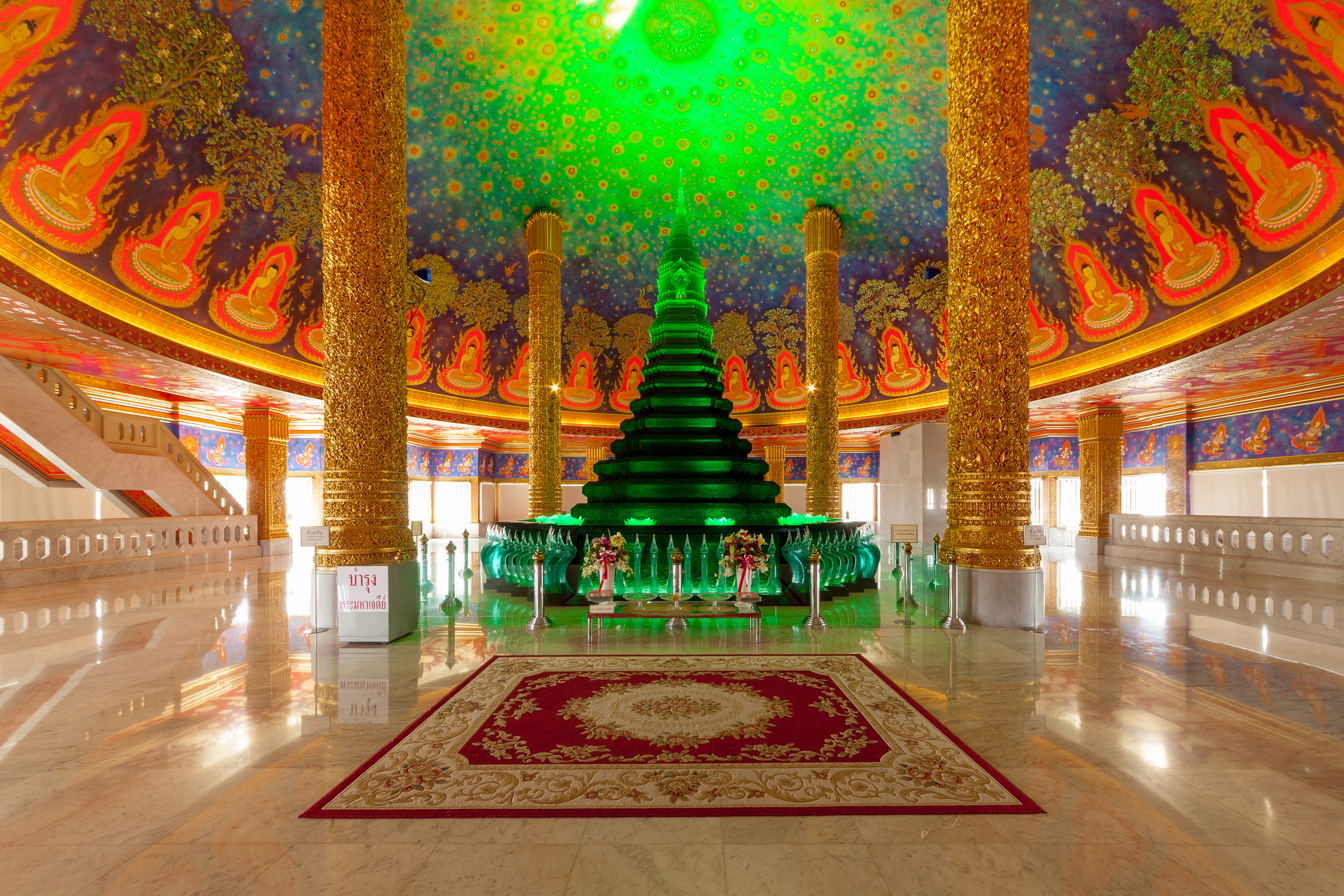
Emerald stupa at the head temple of Wat Paknam

The head temple Wat Paknam Bhasicharoen is a royal Buddhist temple located in Bangkok, the capital of Thailand. It was built in 1610 AD during the late Ayutthaya kingdom. (Note: See Chattinawat (2009, p. 53) and "อลังการ 500 ล้าน! เปิดกรุพระมหาเจดีย์ ส่องพิพิธภัณฑ์ เว่อร์วังฉบับวัดปากน้ำ" [500 million, that's impressive: the great stupa revealed, amazing palace-like museum in Wat Paknam]. Thai Rath (in Thai). 20 February 2016. Archived from the original on 12 September 2019. Only the latter contains the exact year. For an English source, see Swearer, Donald K (2004). "Thailand" (PDF). In Buswell, Robert E Jr (ed.). Encyclopedia of Buddhism. Vol. 2. Farmington Hills: Thomson-Gale. p. 831. ISBN 0-02-865720-9. Archived from the original (PDF) on 2017-05-17.) In the 20th century, Wat Paknam expanded its focus to include international missionary work, with branches in various cities in the United States, New Zealand, India, and Japan.

Established in 1998, the Japan branch of this Theravada Buddhist temple is the largest Thai temple in Japan, covering an area of approximately 2,000 tsubo (8,000 m2). It serves as the center of Theravada Buddhist beliefs for Thai residents in the Greater Tokyo Area and Japan. The branch offers all the facilities of a typical Thai temple, including an auditorium, a large dining hall, an ubosot hall, a vihāra hall, a bell tower, a garden, a monks' lodging building, and a general lodging building. The temple is staffed by five Thai Bhikkhu(male monks).

Wat Paknam Japan is not only a religious facility, but also a place of exchange for Thai people living in Japan, and in cooperation with the Royal Thai Embassy in Japan, it also offers mobile consular services, training in Thai massage, and lessons in Thai cooking and Thai-style fruit carving.

== History ==
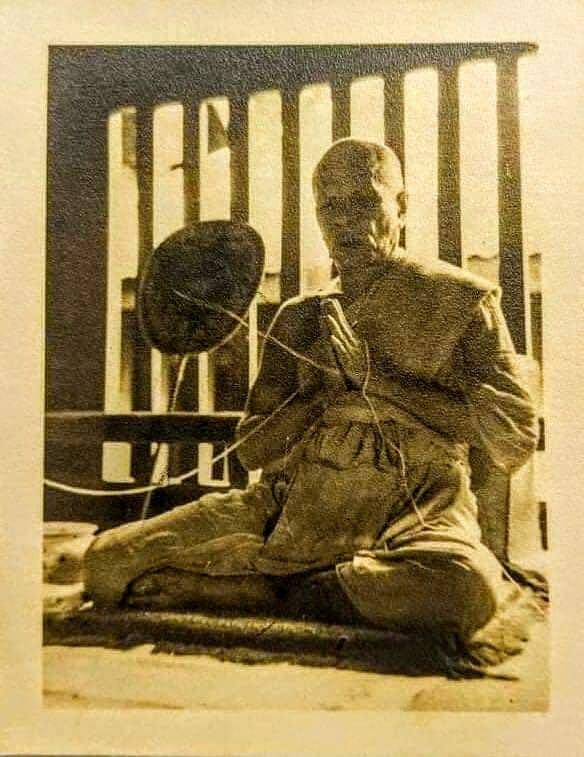
Luang Pu Sodh

Luang Pu Sodh (1884-1959), who was the abbot of Wat Paknam main temple in the early 20th century and is considered the middle founder of Wat Paknam, had a strong desire to spread Buddhism to all countries. Wat Paknam has ordained people of non-Thai nationalities, including both Bhikkhus and Maechi (female monastics).

After the ordination of a Japanese to the Bhikkhu at Wat Paknam in 1957, Luang Pu Sodh had the idea of establishing a temple in Japan, but Luang Pu Sodh died in 1959, so this idea remained a concept.

After Luang Pu Sodh's death in 1959, Wat Paknam's group spent more than 30 years and visited Japan 10 times to continue their missionary work.

In 1998, at the initiative of a Japanese resident of Thai descent, the first site for Wat Paknam was purchased with the intention of becoming a center for Thai residents. The purchase of the land was financed by the sales of the Thai resident's import and catering business and the main temple in Thailand. The first site was attached to the airline company's buildings, which were converted into Bhikkhus' cells and an auditorium for the temple. Five Bhikkhus joined the temple later that year.

From 2003 to 2008, important Theravada Buddhist buildings were constructed by Thai carpenters and formalized into a temple. 2003 saw the dedication of the ubosot which was attended by the Royal Thai Ambassador, 105 Thai Bhikkhus, and over 3,000 Thais from Thailand and Japan. The Vihāra was completed in 2008.

From 2012 to 2020, new construction was carried out with donations and labor services from Thai residents, focusing on smaller facilities such as the kitchen, small shrine, bell tower, handbasin (Chōzuya), and rest area.

== Geography ==
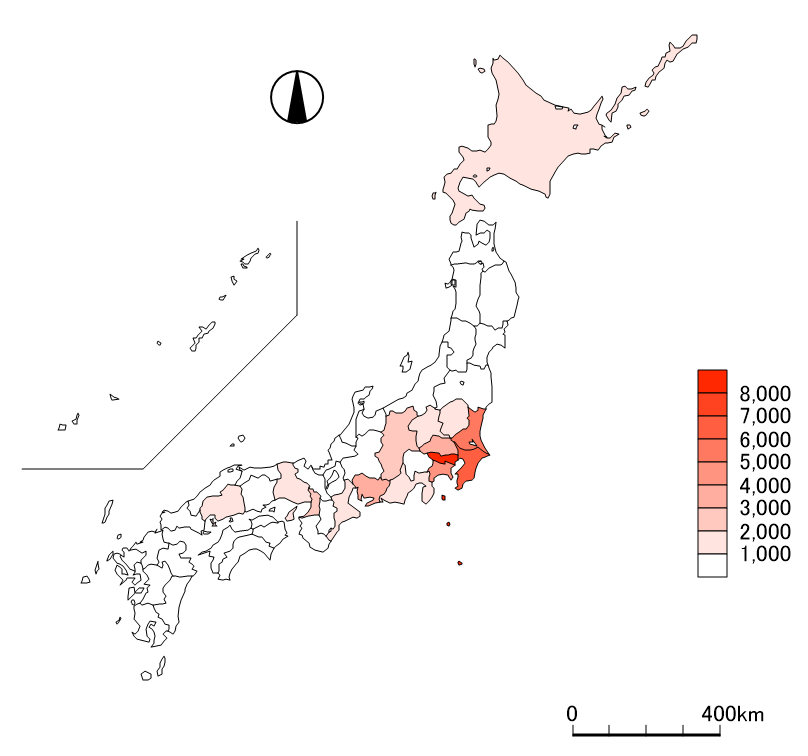
Distribution of Thai by Prefecture, 2022

Wat Paknam Japan is built in Narita City, Chiba Prefecture, known for Narita International Airport. The straight line distance from the center of Tokyo to Narita City is approximately 60 km. In addition to Narita Airport, Narita City has the junction of the Higashi-Kantō Expressway and the Ken-Ō Expressway, two major expressways in the Greater Tokyo Area, making it convenient for automobile traffic from the Tokyo area.

Thai residents in Japan are concentrated in the Greater Tokyo Area, with the largest number of Thai residents in Tokyo, Chiba, Ibaraki, Kanagawa, and Saitama prefectures, in that order, with Chiba Prefecture having the second largest number of Thai residents in Japan.

When establishing a branch temple in Japan, several sites were considered,and a temple was built on this site because it was close to Narita International Airport and away from the hustle and bustle of the city. Thai worshippers come from various places such as Chiba, Ibaraki, and Tochigi, and some Thai groups in Japan have chartered several large buses from Nagano Prefecture

== Facilities ==
Wat Paknam Japan was built on the former site of Aviation-related companies. The company's dormitory, training building, and other buildings have been renovated and used as they are, and the temple grounds have the atmosphere of a school campus. The Thai-style buildings, such as the ubosot and vihāra, were built later. Wat Paknam Japan consists of five types of exterior buildings: Thai-style, modern-style, Japanese-style, Thai-Japanese mixed-style, and temporary, with the Thai-style exterior being the predominant view today.

=== Grand Sala (Auditorium) ===
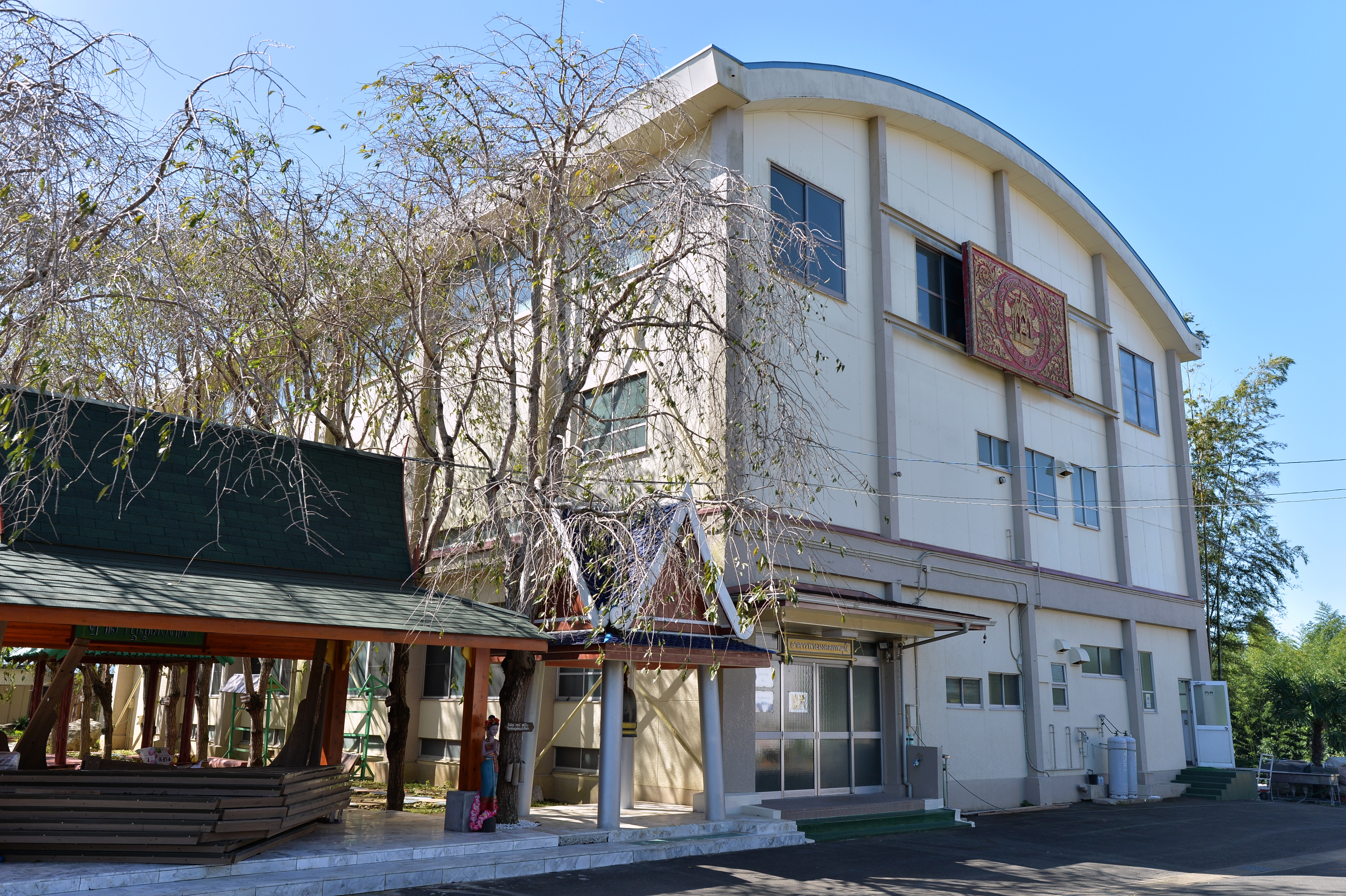
Grand Sala, bell tower(center)

The Grand sala is two-story auditorium, conversion of an existing RC facility. The hall on the first floor of the building has an altar in which three statues are enshrined side by side. In the center of the platform is a statue of Buddha, and on either side are statues of Luang Pu Sodh and the current abbot of Wat Paknam.

=== Sala (dining hall) ===
The Sala is a one-story dining hall, converted from an existing RC structure. The place where Dāna and Dhutanga take place when visitors bring food and visit the Bhikkhus. Inside the hall, as in the main hall, there is a small platform in which three statues of Buddha and Bhikkhu are enshrined.

=== Bhikkhus' quarters and accommodations ===
There is a two-story RC building with 10 rooms for Bhikkhus' accommodation (10 rooms), a five-story RC building for general accommodation (50 rooms), and a wooden abbot quarters.

=== Ubosot ===
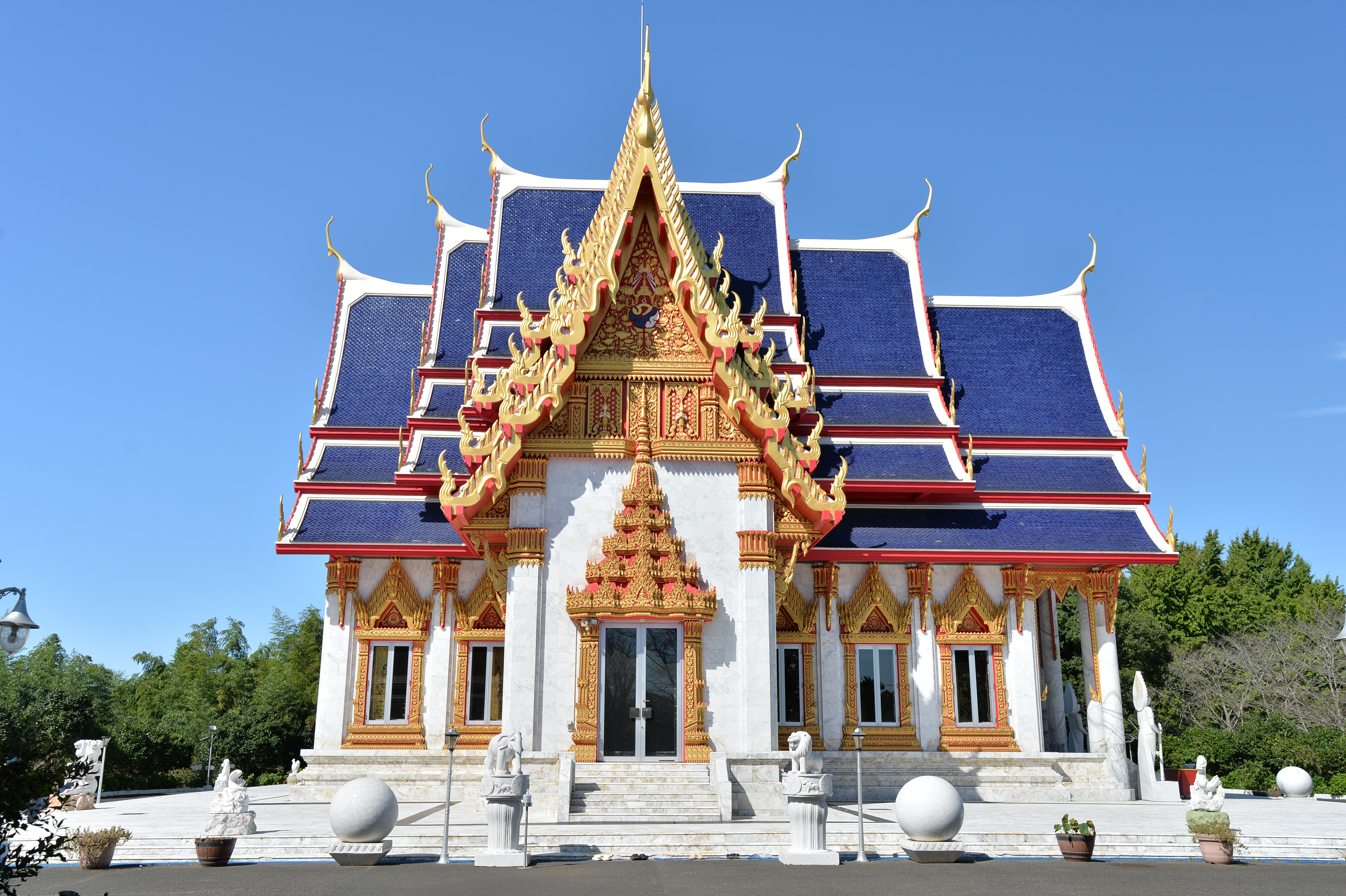
Ubosot

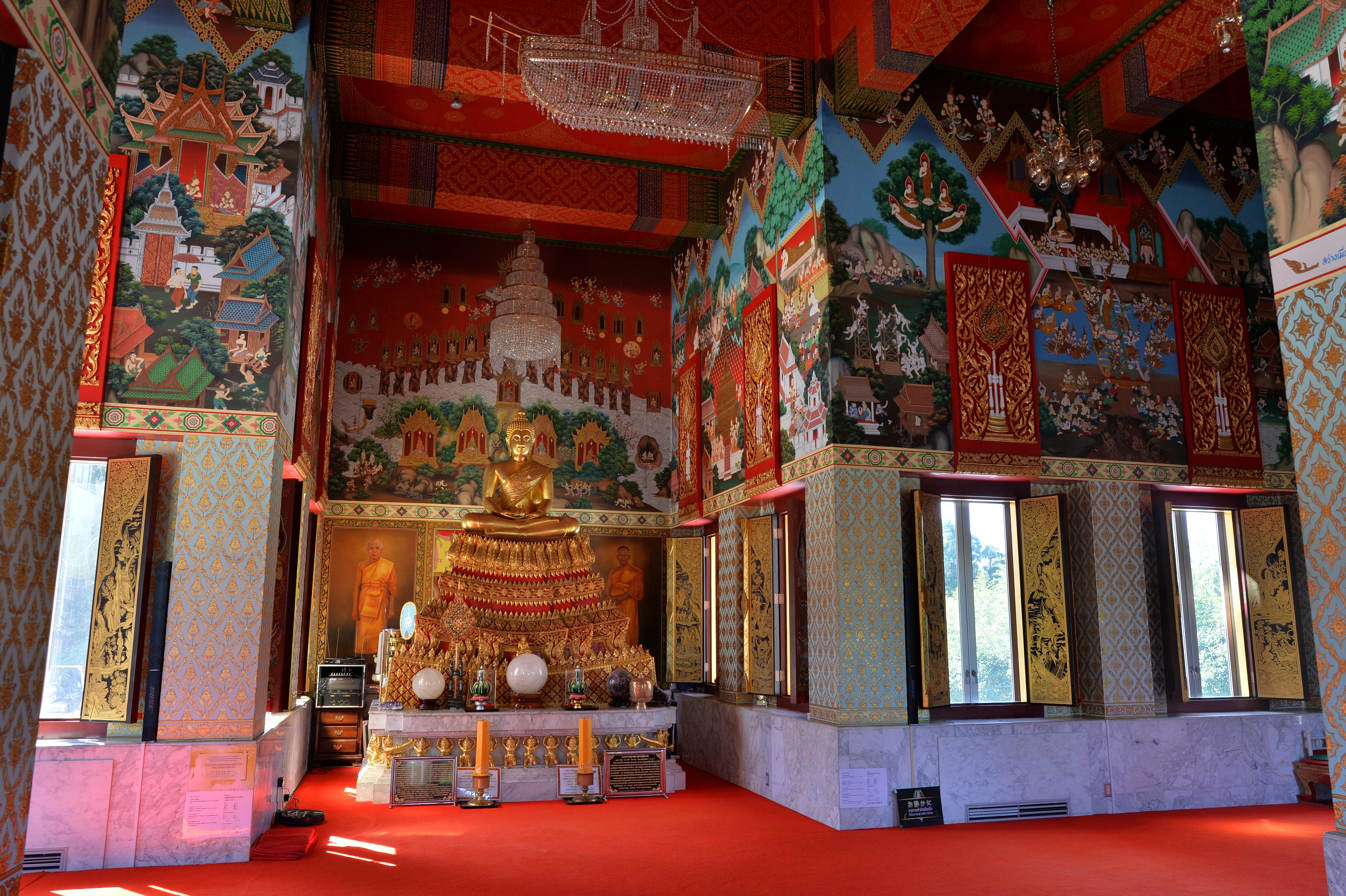
Ubosot inside

Ubosot is a one-story building. It was newly built in 2003 by carpenters invited from Thailand. The Uposatha is a practice in which the brotherhood gathers twice a month to review their actions in light of the precepts and to repent for actions that are not in accordance with the precepts. ubosot is also a place for secular people to receive the precepts and become a Bhikkhu.

Ubhosot is the most important building in a Buddhist temple in Thailand, and important ceremonies are always held at ubosot. Ubosot is the most conspicuous building in the Japan brunch with its blue roof, marble walls, and gold-colored decorations. All the marble was brought from Thailand. The upper part of the door of the ubosot is decorated with the royal abbreviation, title, and the coat of arms commemorating the King's birthday, with the permission of the royal family.

The upper walls of the ubosot are decorated with scenes from Jataka and other Buddhist stories and a golden Buddha image is enshrined in the back of the hall. In the hall, Bhikkhus, Maechi and visitors sit in front of the Buddha image at 5:00 p.m. for sutra reading and meditation. Maechi performs sutra reading and meditation three times, at 5:00 PM, 2:00 PM, and 7:00 PM. At ubosot, the precepts of sutra recitation and meditation are the exclusive practice.

=== Vihāra ===
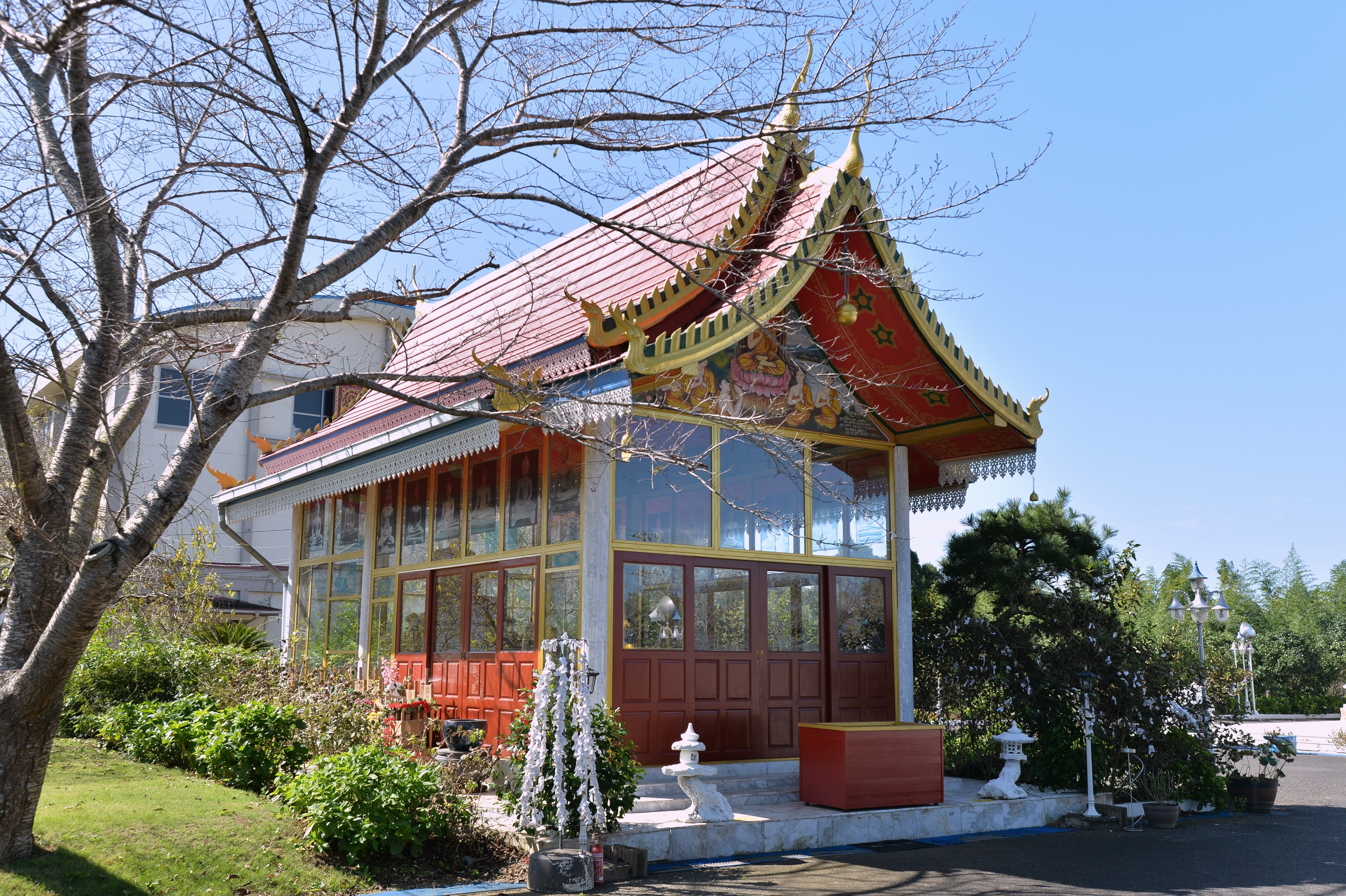
Vihāra, saisen-box(center), tied fortune(left)

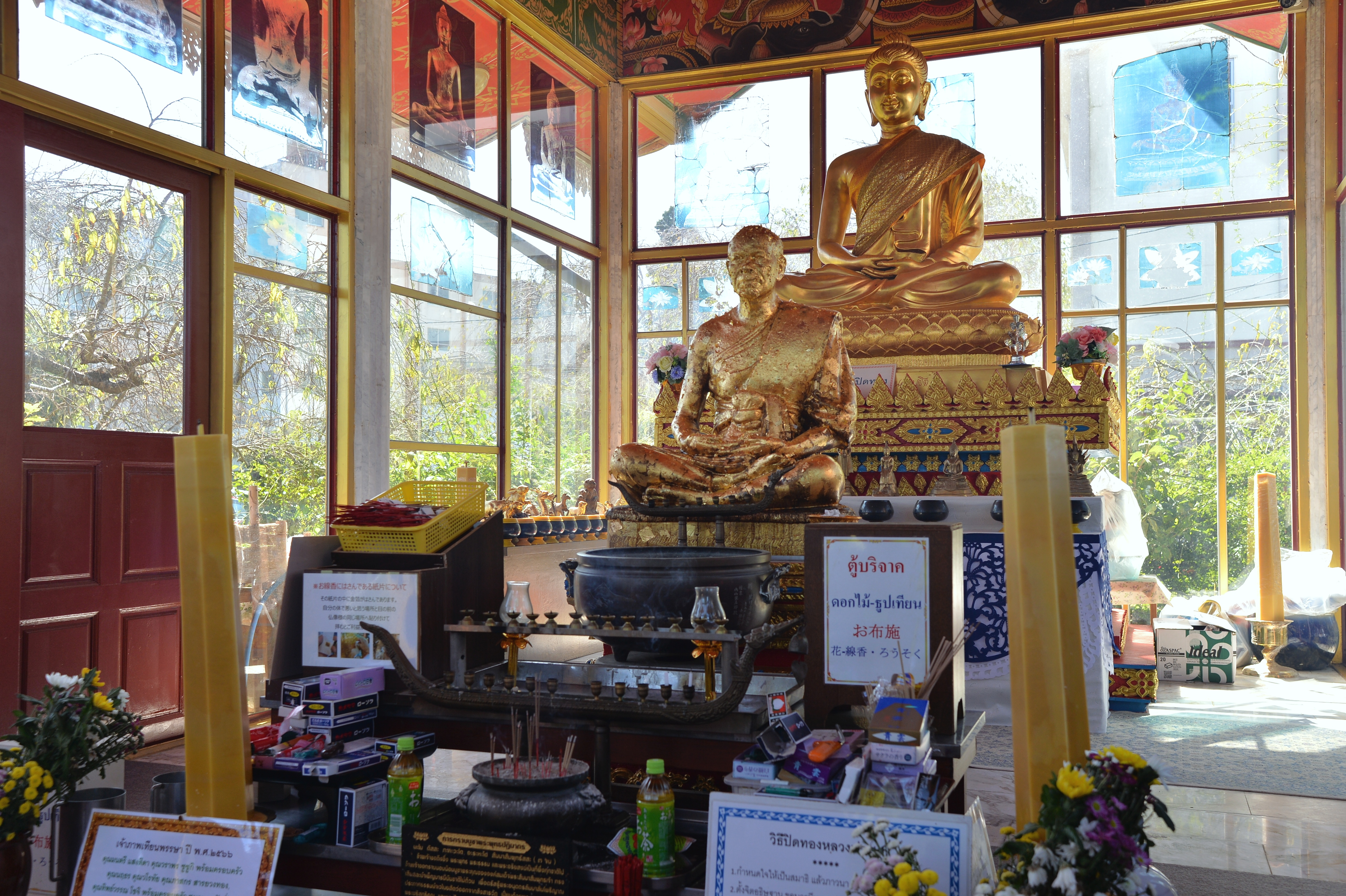
Vihāra inside

A one-story glass-walled building in which a Buddha image is enshrined. It was newly built in 2008 by carpenters invited from Thailand.

=== Gallery ===
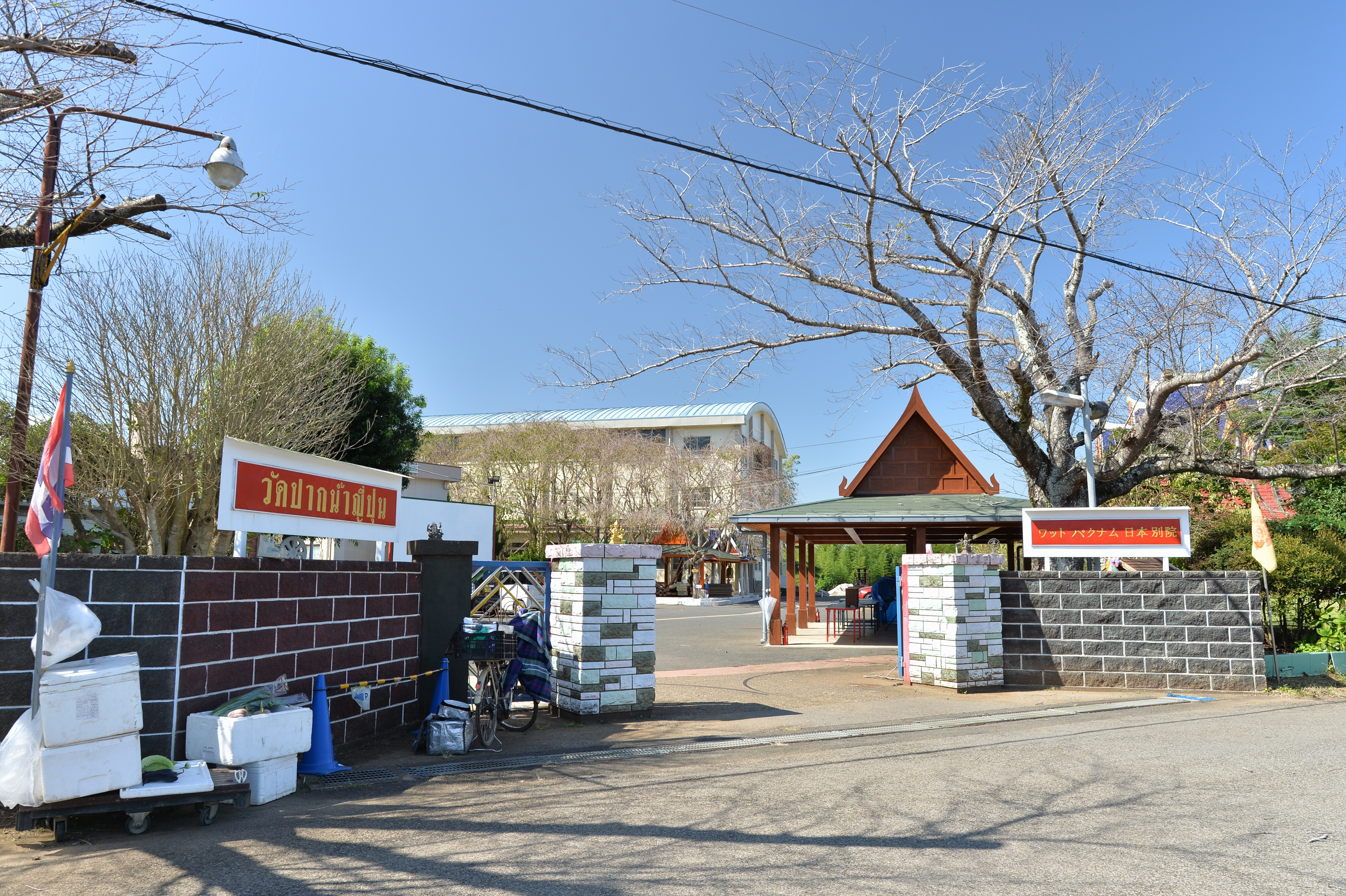
Entrance

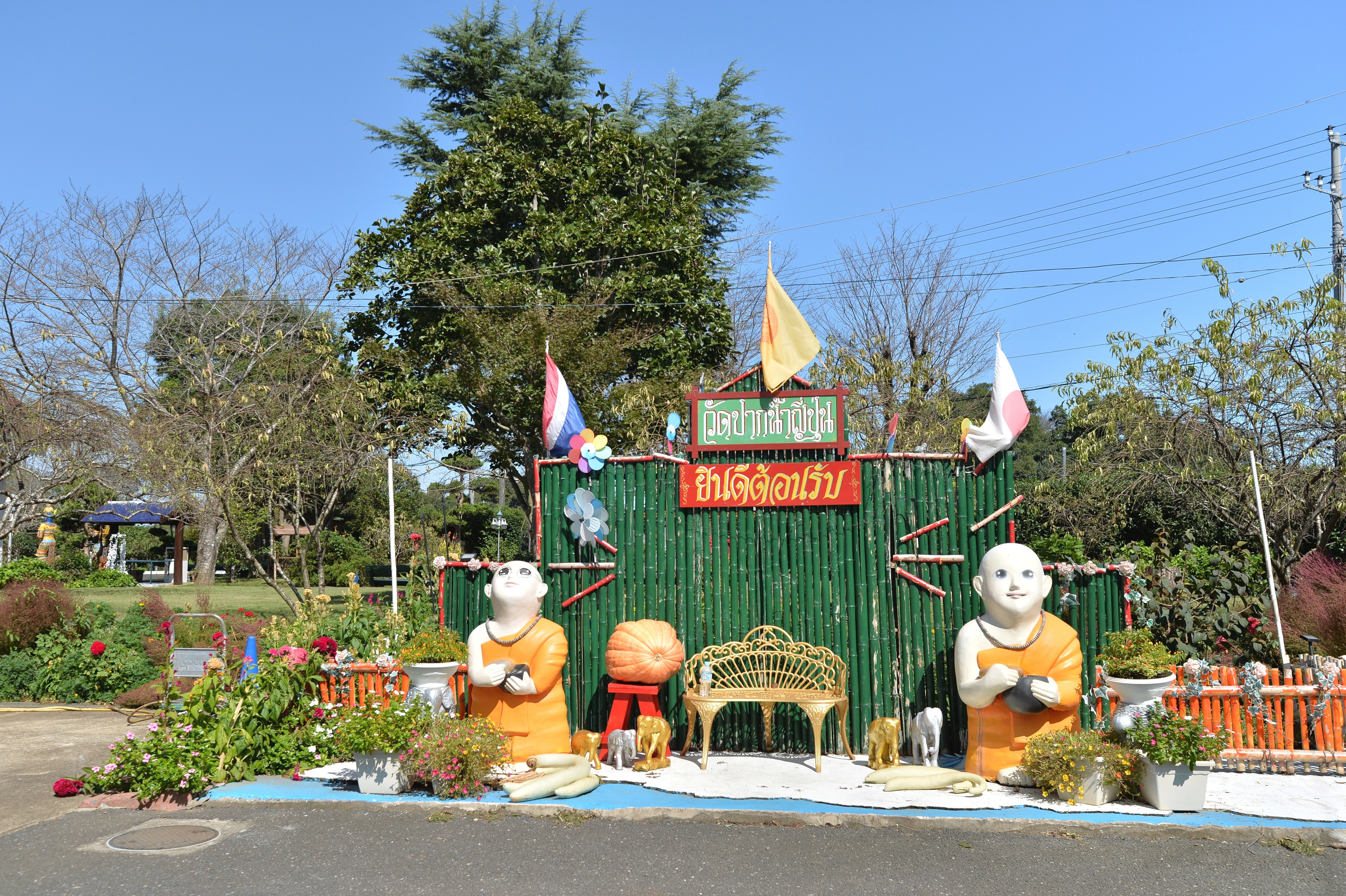
Garden

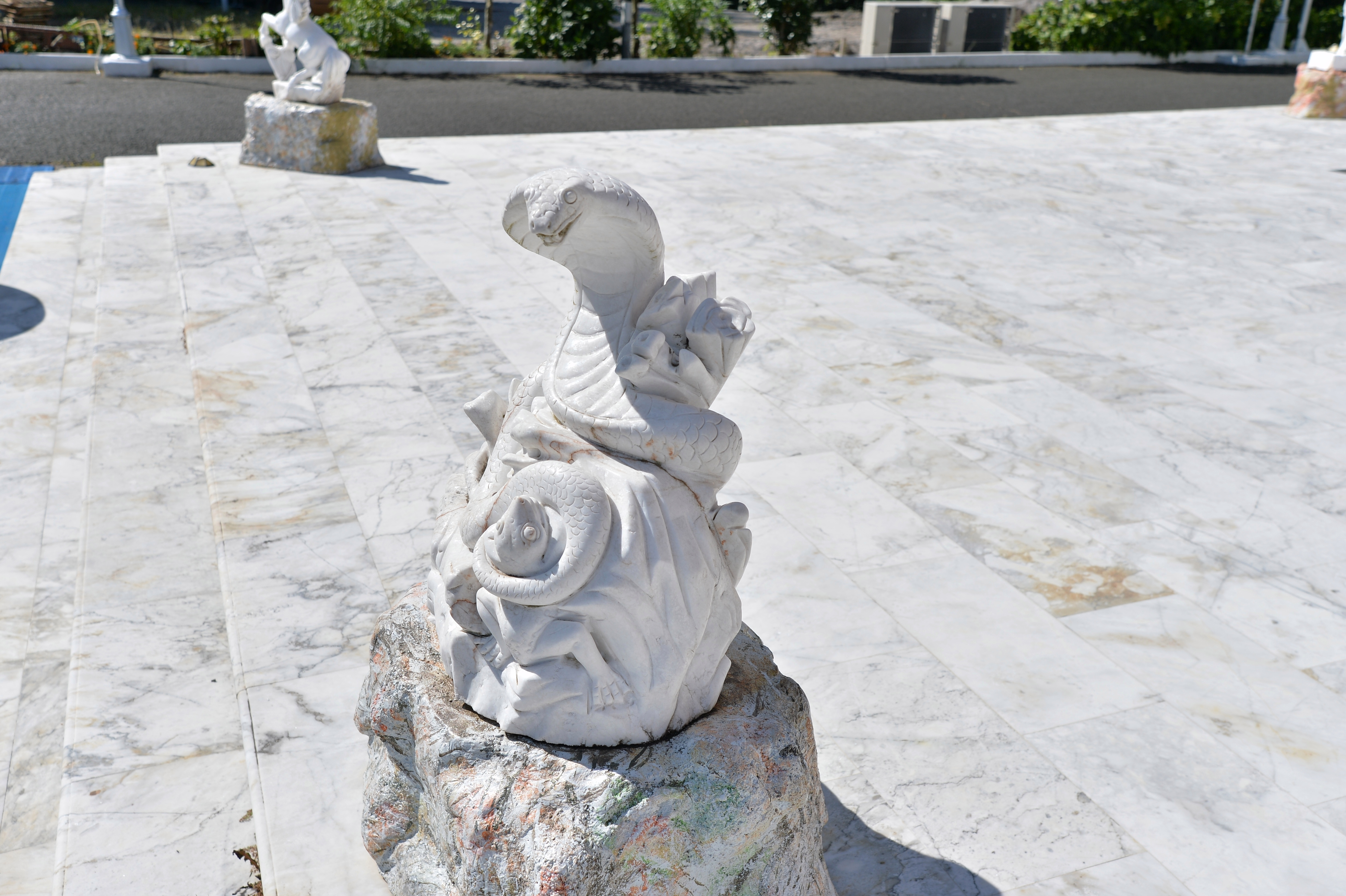
Sclupture of snake close to ubosot

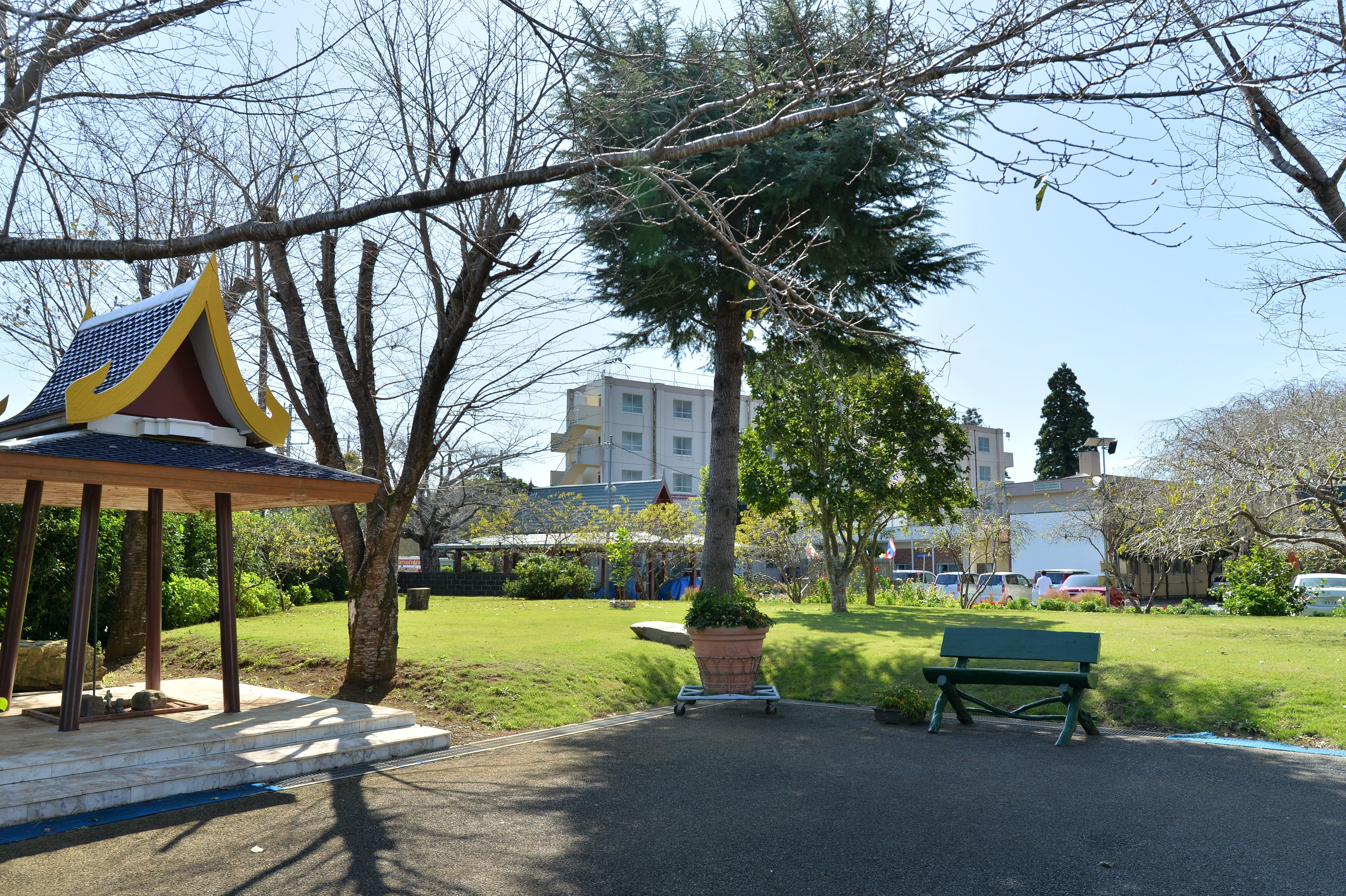
Garden, general accommodation building(behind)

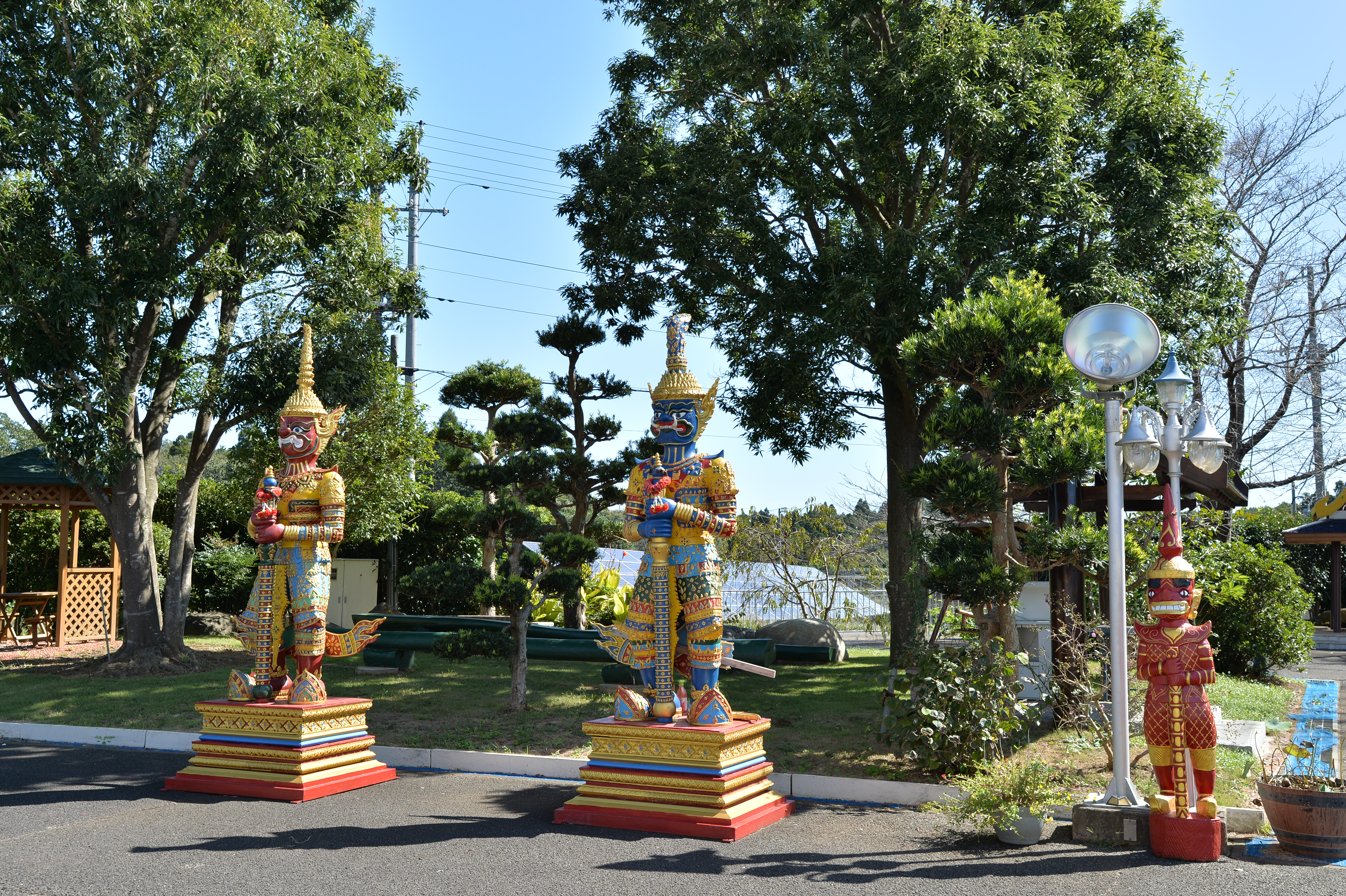
Yakshas in garden

== Rituals ==
Festivals are held on major Thai holidays and Buddhist events such as Songkran (Thai Lunar New Year), Loy Krathong, Visakha Puja (Buddha's Birthday), and the birthday of the King of Thailand. According to the bhikku of the Japan branch, the "Kathina Robe Offering Ceremony," held annually around October or November, is the most crowded festival day throughout the year, when Buddhist robes are offered to the Bodhisattva.

On festival days, there is a lecture hall where sermons are given and a temporary consulate is set up to provide passport renewal and other services for Thai residents in Japan.

== See also ==
- Japan–Thailand relations
- Nittai-ji

== Sources ==
- Chattinawat, Nathathai (2009). สถานภาพของแม่ชี: กรณีศึกษาแม่ชีวัดปากน้ําภาษีเจริญ กรุงเทพฯ [Nun's status: A Case Study of Wat Paknam Bhasicharoen] (M.A. thesis) (in Thai). College of Interdisciplinary Studies, Thammasat University. Archived from the original on 23 March 2016.
- Gosling, David L. (1 January 1998). "The Changing Roles of Thailand's Lay Nuns (Mae Chii)". Asian Journal of Social Science. 26 (1): 121–142. doi:10.1163/030382498X00102.
- Newell, Catherine Sarah (April 2008). Monks, meditation and missing links: continuity, "orthodoxy" and the vijja dhammakaya in Thai Buddhism (Thesis). Department of the Study of Religions, School of Oriental and African Studies, University of London. doi:10.25501/SOAS.00007499.
- Momoka Sato; Takuya Abe; Kyouta Yamada (August 2023). "The Formation of Wat Pak Nam Japan Branch and ITS Relationship with Thai Originated Dwellers". Journal of Architecture and Planning (Transactions of AIJ). 88 (810): 2348–2359. doi:10.3130/aija.88.2348.
