= Beppu (disambiguation) =

Beppu (Japanese: 別府) is a city in Japan.

Beppu may also refer to:

- Beppu University, a private university in the cities of Beppu and Ōita
- Beppu Station, a passenger railway station in Beppu
- Beppu (surname)
