= Setsuya Beppu =

Japanese diplomat (1904–1992)

Setsuya Beppu (Japanese: 別府 節弥 or Japanese: 別府 節彌, 4 March 1904 - 17 May 1992), also known as Kiyoshi Beppu (Japanese: 別府清), was a Japanese diplomat who served as the first Japanese Consul in Dublin during the World War II. He also served as the first Japanese Ambassador Extraordinary and Plenipotentiary to both Laos and Vatican City.

== Early life ==
Beppu was born on 4 March 1904 in Kōchi Prefecture in Japan as Kiyoshi Beppu. He passed the higher civil service diplomatic examination (Japanese: 文官高等試験外交科) in October 1924. He graduated from the Faculty of Law at Tokyo Imperial University in 1926.

== Career ==
=== Early career ===
Beppu started working for the Ministry of Foreign Affairs in March 1926 as a British embassy clerk (Japanese: イギリス書記生). He was appointed as the vice-consul in London in December 1927, and the attaché to Belgium in April 1929. His brother-in-law Shunsuke Naruse was also a diplomat, and he died in Iran in 1929.

Beppu was assigned to the First Asian Division at the Ministry of Foreign Affairs from June 1931. On 25 August 1932 he officially changed his name from Kiyoshi to Setsuya. He became the official in the First Asian Division at the Ministry of Foreign Affairs in May 1933. In December 1933, he was appointed as the third secretary for the Shanghai legation in the Republic of China. In May 1935 he was promoted to the third secretary for the Japanese Embassy to China. From December 1935, he was assigned to the Second European and Asian Division at the Ministry of Foreign Affairs, and in March 1936 he became the diplomatic official at the First Division of the Cultural Affairs Department.

=== Britain and Ireland during World War II ===
Beppu became the Consul of Liverpool in January 1939 at the age of 35. He became the second secretary for the legation of Switzerland (with Norway and Denmark) in January 1940. In June 1940, he was appointed as the second secretary for the Embassy of Japan and Consul in Liverpool, and in December the first secretary for the Embassy of Japan and Consul.

In 1940, Beppu, as a Japanese Consul in Liverpool, rented a private house and opened a consulate in Dublin in the Irish Free State. While he was stationed in Dublin, the United Kingdom declared war on the Empire of Japan in December 1941, and since he could not go back to the United Kingdom, he continued his diplomatic work in Dublin. He "maintained an extremely low profile during the war" in Dublin. The Embassy of Japan in London was closed after the beginning of the war, and it is assumed that the Dublin consulate would have been responsible for helping and evacuating Japanese citizens in the United Kingdom to Ireland if the United Kingdom had broken off diplomatic relations with Japan and they had been subject to danger, which did not happen. Due to the rise of the anti-British sentiment in Ireland during the World War II, Thomas Mullins, an IRA member and later the Leader of the Seanad, bought all the rice in Dublin to prepare for Japanese food and celebrated the fall of Singapore and Arthur Percival's surrender on 15 February 1942 with Beppu and other Japanese officials at the consulate of Japan. In May 1943, Beppu was officially appointed as the Consul-General of Dublin.

Beppu was involved in the diplomatic negotiation for the termination of the war between Japan and the allies of World War II. On 2 August 1945, he met Robert Brennan, the Irish Free State's first minister to the United States, and heard from him about the United States Under Secretary of State Joseph Grew's remark hinting that the war would end soon when the Japanese people wanted it. On 8 August, he telegrammed this information to Japan. On 10 August, he obtained more information about the intention of the United States Department of State from the Department of External Affairs of Ireland, and also telegrammed it to Japan. These telegrams were intercepted and decoded by the Government Code and Cypher School in Bletchley Park and preserved in The National Archives of the United Kingdom.

After the defeat of the war, Beppu had sabotaged the request from the allies to hand over the consulate's assets and documents to them for three years "with the tacit support of the government of Ireland". In 1946, he was officially dismissed by the Allied Command because he did not follow its order. He returned to Japan in 1948, and was tried by the Supreme Commander for the Allied Powers (SCAP). This is called "Beppu Case" (Japanese: 別府事件).

=== After WWII ===
On 10 April 1959, he was appointed as the first Japanese Ambassador Extraordinary and Plenipotentiary to Laos: before him, the Japanese ambassadorship to Laos had been held by the ambassadors of Japan to Thailand. He was appointed as the Japanese Ambassador Extraordinary and Plenipotentiary to Vatican City in 1962. He served as the president of the Japan Institute of International Affairs from May 1965 to April 1968. He also worked as a translator around the 1960s: he translated Abe Fortas's Concerning Dissent and Civil Disobedience into Japanese in 1970. He died of myocardial infarction on 17 May 1992.

== Legacy ==
According to Richard B. Finn, while Beppu was penalised by the SCAP, his later diplomatic career was successful. He was regarded as a prominent diplomat in the diplomatic community in Japan. Ryōtarō Shiba referred to him as a "besieged soldier under the war" in On the Highways: Travel in Ireland II (Japanese: 街道をゆく 愛蘭土紀行II).

== Awards and Recognitions ==
- December 1927 - Junior Seventh Rank
- October 1929 - Senior Seventh Rank
- June 1930 - Order of the Crown, Chevalier (Belgium)
- June 1935 - Junior Sixth Rank
- March 1936 - Sixth Class
- February 1938 - Senior Sixth Rank
- February 1940 - Fifth Class
- February 1941 - Junior Fifth Rank
- January 1945 - Senior Fifth Rank
- 1974 - The Order of the Rising Sun, Gold and Silver Star (2nd class)
