= List of ambassadors of Japan to Thailand =

Diplomatic relations between the Japanese and Thai governments were established in 1887. Until August 16, 1941, relations between the Japanese and the Thai governments were on legations level, then raised to embassy level. These relations were suspended between 1945 and 1952 following the Japanese surrender.

== Ministers Plenipotentiaries ==
1. Manjiro Inagaki 1897-1907

2. Shosaku Matsukata 1907-1908

3. Sakuya Yoshida 1908-1915

4. Genshiro Nishi 1915-1921

5. Tokichi Masao 1921-1922

6. Chonosuke Yada 1922-1926

7. Kyujiro Hayashi 1926-1928

8. Yasukichi Yatabe 1928-1936

9. Itaro Ishii 1936-1937

10. Kuramatsu Murai 1937-1941

11. Yasusato Futami 1941

== Ambassadors ==
12. Teiji Tsubogami 1941-1944

13. Kumaichi Yamamoto 1944-1945

14. Koichi Suzuki (head of the liaison office) 1951-1952

15. Ichiro Ota 1952-1956

16. Shinichi Shibusawa 1956-1959

17. Akira Ohe 1959-1963

18. Hisanaga Shimazu 1963-1964

19. Yoshio Kasuya 1964-1967

20. Morisaburo Seki 1967-1968

21. Torao Ushiroku 1968-1972

22. Masato Fujisaki 1972-1976

23. Hiroshi Hitomi 1976-1980

24. Motoo Ogiso 1980-1983

25. Masatada Tachibana 1983-1986

26. Akitane Kiuchi 1986-1988

27. Hisahiko Okazaki 1988-1992

28. Hiroaki Fujii 1992-1994

29. Takashi Onda 1994-1996

30. Hiroshi Ota 1996-1999

31. Nobutoshi Akao 1999-2002

32. Atsushi Tokinoya 2002-2005

33. Hideaki Kobayashi 2005-2008

34. Kyoji Komachi 2008–2010

35. Seiji Kojima 2010–2012

36. Shigekazu Sato 2012–2015

37. Shiro Sadoshima 2015–2021

== Laos ==
Until 1959, the Japanese ambassadorship to Laos had also been held by the ambassadors of Japan to Thailand, but on 10 April 1959, Setsuya Beppu was appointed as the first Japanese Ambassador Extraordinary and Plenipotentiary to Laos.
