= Japanese language education in Thailand =

Language education in Thai universities

Japanese language education in Thailand formally dates back to the 1960s, when Thai universities began to establish Japanese language courses. A 2006 survey by the Japan Foundation found 1,153 teachers teaching the language to 71,083 students at 385 institutions; the number of students increased by 29.5% compared to the 2003 survey. As of 2024, according to the Japan Foundation, 194,366 people were learning Japanese in Thailand.

== Standardised testing ==
JLPT examinees in Thailand
| Year | City | Examinees by Level | | | | |
| Year | City | L1 | L2 | L3 | L4 | Total |
|---|---|---|---|---|---|---|
| 2009 | Bangkok | 958 | 2,993 | 4,591 | 4,952 | 13,494 |
| 2009 | Chiang Mai | 65 | 315 | 597 | 964 | 1,941 |
| 2009 | Songkla | 4 | 35 | 78 | 261 | 378 |
| 2009 | Khon Kaen | 12 | 129 | 379 | 435 | 955 |
| 2009 | Total | 1,039 | 3,472 | 5,645 | 6,612 | 16,768 |
| 2008 | Bangkok | 754 | 2,704 | 4,356 | 5,037 | 12,851 |
| 2008 | Chiang Mai | 64 | 239 | 639 | 910 | 1,852 |
| 2008 | Songkla | 1 | 18 | 80 | 220 | 319 |
| 2008 | Khon Kaen | 8 | 94 | 316 | 406 | 824 |
| 2008 | Total | 827 | 3,055 | 5,391 | 6,573 | 15,846 |
| 2006 | Bangkok | 700 | 1949 | 3100 | 3900 | 9649 |
| 2006 | Chiang Mai | 52 | 202 | 628 | 1021 | 1794 |
| 2006 | Songkhla | 4 | 37 | 89 | 291 | 463 |
| 2005 | Bangkok | 633 | 1616 | 2416 | 3456 | 8121 |
| 2005 | Chiang Mai | 56 | 164 | 409 | 1120 | 1749 |
| 2005 | Songkhla | 7 | 41 | 122 | 293 | 463 |
| 2004 | Bangkok | 434 | 1280 | 1940 | 2719 | 6373 |
| 2004 | Chiang Mai | 35 | 170 | 333 | 798 | 1336 |
| 2004 | Songkhla | 2 | 33 | 94 | 180 | 309 |
| 2003 | Bangkok | 380 | 1188 | 1773 | 2735 | 6076 |
| 2003 | Chiang Mai | 27 | 151 | 273 | 746 | 1197 |
| 2002 | Bangkok | Data missing | | | | |
| 2002 | Chiang Mai | Data missing | | | | |
| 2001 | Bangkok | 211 | 681 | 1198 | 1774 | 3864 |
| 2001 | Chiang Mai | 18 | 61 | 157 | 303 | 539 |
| 2000 | Bangkok | 194 | 696 | 960 | 1338 | 3188 |
| 2000 | Chiang Mai | 15 | 70 | 130 | 238 | 453 |
| 1999 | Bangkok | 152 | 544 | 811 | 1174 | 2681 |
| 1999 | Chiang Mai | 24 | 45 | 120 | 205 | 394 |
| 1998 | Bangkok | - | - | - | - | 2175 |
| 1998 | Chiang Mai | - | - | - | - | 289 |

The Japanese Language Proficiency Test is offered in three cities in Thailand; at first, it was just offered in Bangkok and Chiang Mai, but an additional test site was added in Songkhla in 2003. The Level 4 examination, aimed at beginning students with 150 contact hours of construction, is the most widely attempted; numbers of examinees decrease at higher levels. The number of examinees nearly quintupled between 1998 and 2006. Bangkok is the only city in Southeast Asia in which JETRO's Business Japanese Proficiency Test is offered. In 2006, 232 candidates attempted the examination; their performance, measured by the proportion of examinees who were assessed as having each of the six possible levels of business Japanese proficiency, was similar to the average for examinees in all countries outside Japan. Thai students formed 13% of all candidates attempting the examination outside Japan.

== See also ==
- Japanese as a foreign language
- Education in Thailand
- Language education
