= Japanese Village =

Japanese Village may refer to:

- Japanese Village (Ayutthaya), a former settlement and museum in Ayutthaya, Thailand
- Japanese Village (Dugway Proving Ground), a US Army weapons test facility
- Japanese Village, Knightsbridge, a 1885–1887 exhibition in Knightsbridge, London
- Japanese Village and Deer Park, a defunct amusement park in Buena Park, California
- Japanese Village Plaza, a shopping area in Little Tokyo, Los Angeles

== See also ==
- List of villages in Japan
- Nihonmachi, Japanese communities in early modern East and Southeast Asia
