= João Mendes (merchant) =

- Born: João Mendes; ~1570; Portugal
- Other name: Ji-Wan-Myeon-Je-Su
- Occupation: Merchant
- Years active: 17th century
- Known for: First documented Westerner to arrive in Korea (1604)
João Mendes
- Military career
- Conflicts: Battle of Dangpo (1604) (POW)

João Mendes was a Portuguese merchant and the first documented Westerner to arrive in Korea.

== Biography ==
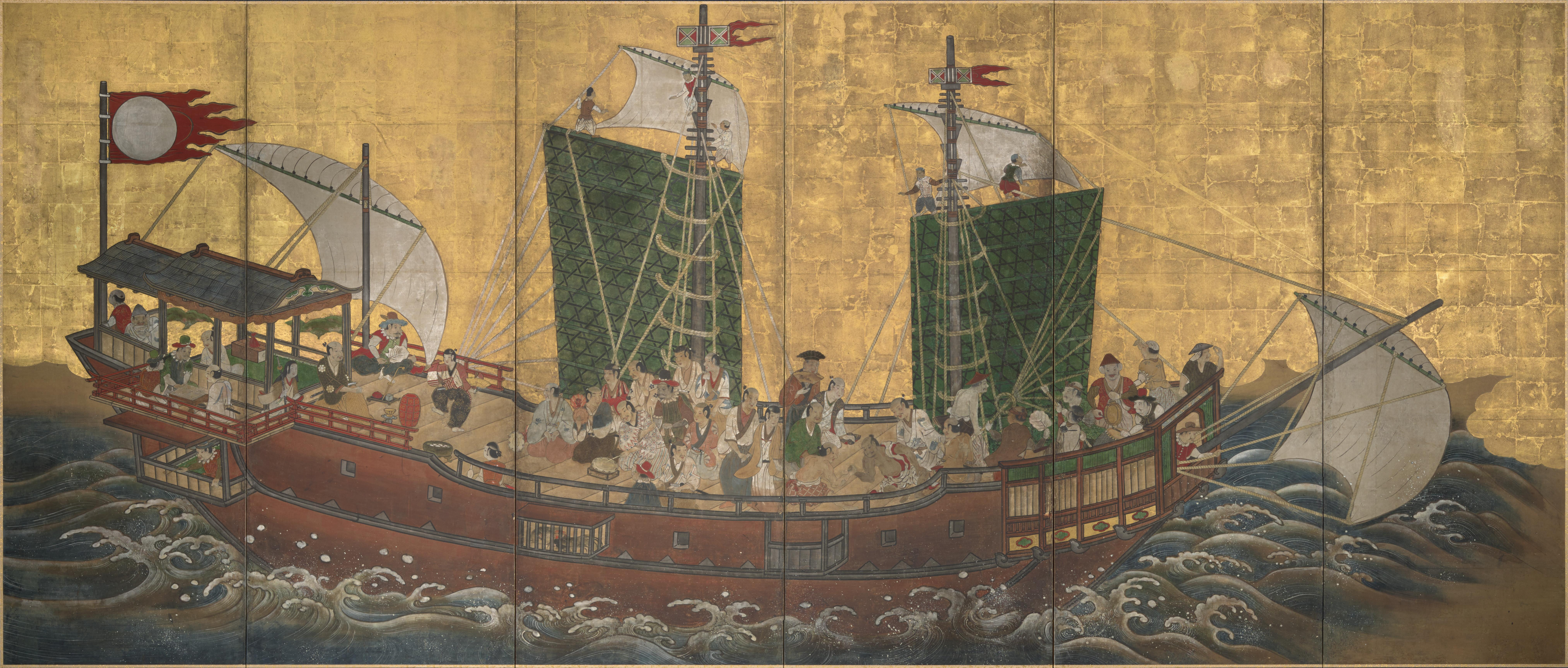
Red Seal ship with Japanese and Portuguese sailors, 17th century

João Mendes was born around 1570, and was a Portuguese merchant active in Southeast Asia in the beginning of the 17th century. At 34, he was in Phnom Penh, Cambodia when a Japanese fleet moved. Attracted by what he had heard about Japan, where other Portuguese traded, he boarded one of the returning boats, a large red ship, that intruded the waters of Tongyeong on June 14, 1604. Under the command of Yi Gyeong-jun, the Supreme Commander of the Three Provinces’ Naval Forces, the warship Panokseon (Korean: 판옥선) was dispatched to request a peaceful surrender. However, as the ship resisted until the end, a fierce battle ensued, ultimately resulting in its capture; Mendes and the rest of the surviving crew was taken prisoner by Joseon and was taken to the capital, Seoul, to be interrogated. Later he was moved to China.

At the time, Korea had recently been the target of an attempted Japanese invasion, repelled by Admiral Yi Sun-sin with support from the Ming dynasty. The Chinese ended up handing João Mendes over to the Portuguese in Macau. He is considered the first Westerner to set foot in Korea and was referred to in Korean annals as Ji-Wan-Myeon-Je-Su.

== Legacy ==
In 2024, his legacy was celebrated with two sculptures created by Portuguese artist Vhils (Alexandre Farto). One is installed in Tongyeong, South Korea, and the other is installed in Lisbon, Portugal.

== See also ==
- Battle of Dangpo (1604)
