= Battle of Dangpo =

Battle of Dangpo can refer to the following:

- Battle of Dangpo (1592) – Japan–Korea battle during the Japanese invasions of Korea
- Battle of Dangpo (1604) – One Japanese trading ship and Korea battle
