= Japanese Village (Ayutthaya) =

Coordinates: 14°19′58″N 100°34′39″E

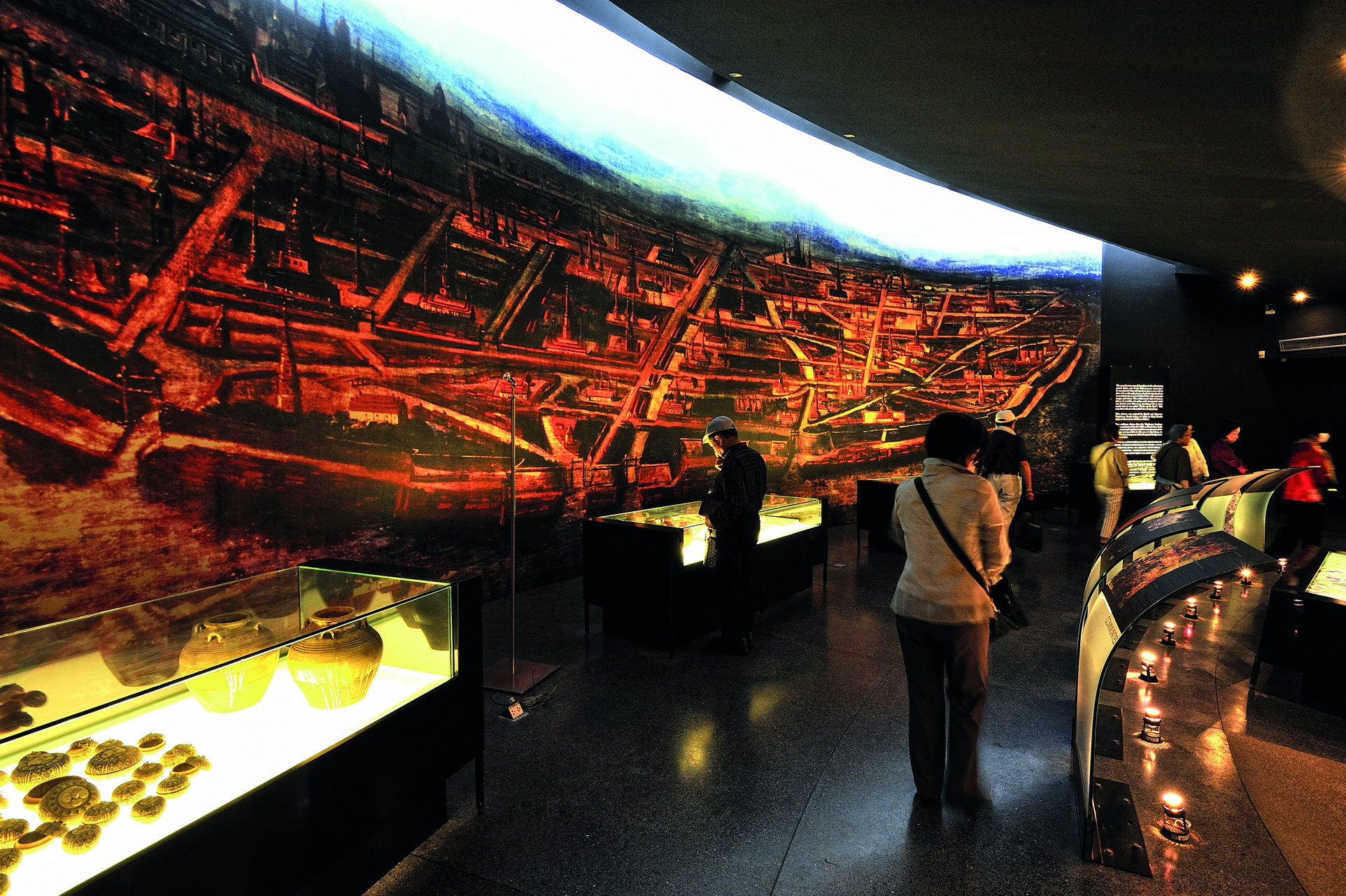
An exhibition about the history of the Japanese Village.

The Japanese Village (Japanese: アユタヤ日本人町, romanized: Ayutaya Nihonjin-machi), known in Thai as Ban Yipun or Muban Yipun (Thai: หมู่บ้านญี่ปุ่น), was a historic Japanese ethnic enclave (nihonmachi) just outside the capital city of the Ayutthaya Kingdom that flourished from the 17th century to the mid-18th century, now in the area of Phra Nakhon Si Ayutthaya District. It was located on the eastern bank of the Chao Phraya river, facing the Portuguese enclave on the western bank, and adjacent to the British and Dutch enclaves. It is believed that approximately 1000 to 1,500 Japanese lived in the enclave (excluding native slaves and indentured servants such as the Tai), though the Japanese book Shamu-koku fūdo gunki (暹羅国風土軍記) estimates there were up to 8,000 ethnic Japanese during the Kan'ei period (1624–1644). The inhabitants of the enclave consisted of mercenaries, traders, Japanese Christians, and Thai and Chinese slaves.

== History ==
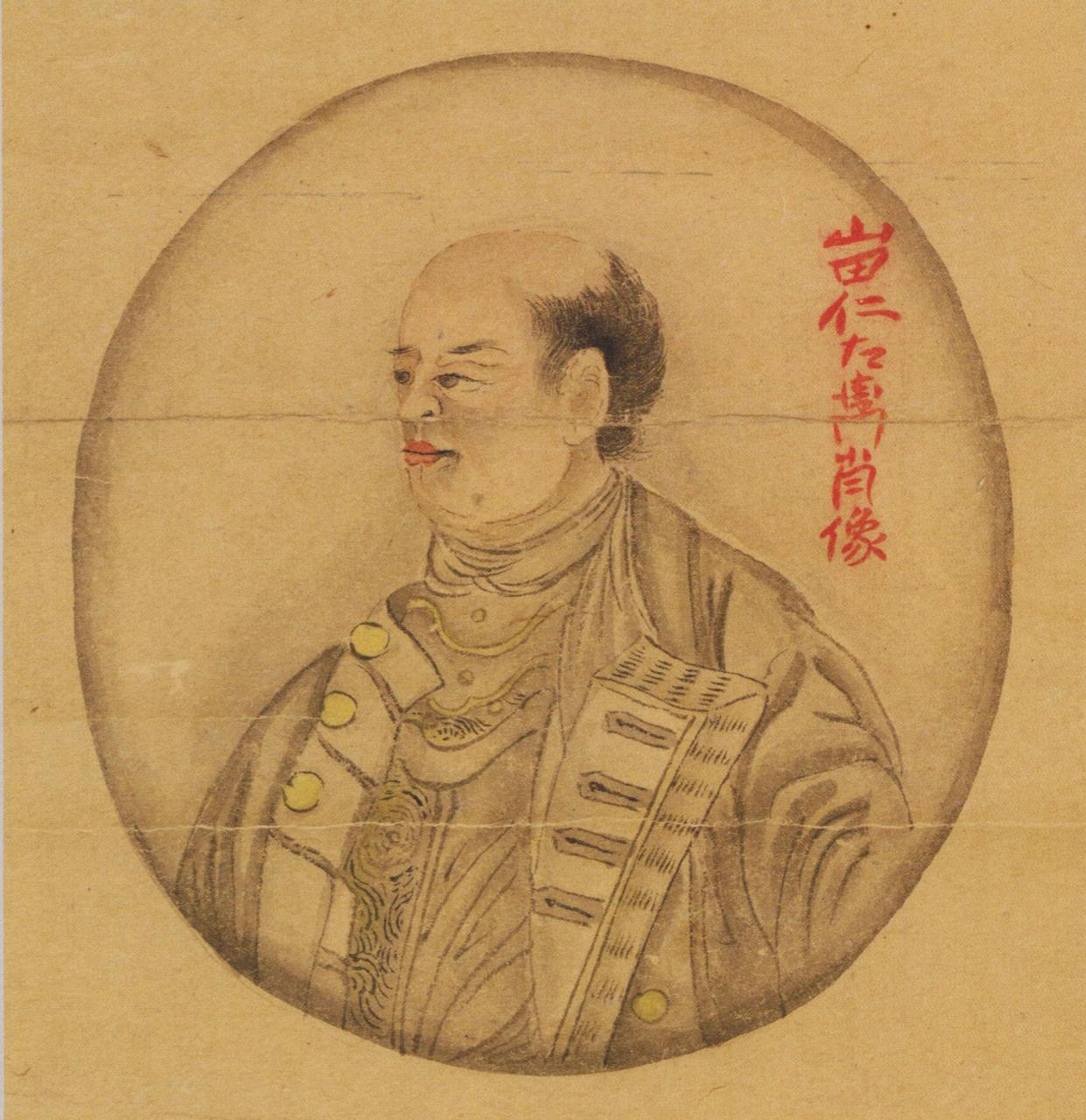
Portrait of Yamada Nagamasa

During the turbulent political landscape of the Sengoku Jidai, ronin (samurai without masters or lords) began migrating en masse out of Japan and into Southeast Asia after Ming China's ban on Sino-Japanese trade and travel, hitting its peak following the climactic Battle of Sekigahara. The Kingdom of Ayutthaya, suffering military defeats from the neighboring Burmese Toungoo Empire, hoped to hire these Japanese samurai that had adequate military experience as mercenaries, which led to a major influx of Japanese immigrants. Portuguese gun corps were usually hired, but Portuguese mercenaries usually balked as the Toungoo had also hired a Portuguese corps. This dilemma was resolved by hiring Japanese mercenaries.

The Japanese mercenaries grew into the hundreds, about 200-800, and they began to grow powerful politically as well. The power of these Japanese corps can be seen in the Three Seals Law, an important Ayutthayan legal code: Japanese mercenaries usually occupied the third-highest rank in the Siamese feudal system, the Phraya rank. Yamada Nagamasa was one such Phraya who had earned his title for his skill in martial arts and drew the admiration of King Songtham.

=== Commercial development ===
Aside from the militaristic backgrounds of the Japanese community in Ayutthaya, there was also development between Japan and other Southeast Asian nations in terms under the success of the red seal ship system. Under King Ekathotsarot, who had a notably large Japanese regiment, a port was built in the enclave to facilitate trade. Due to Ayutthaya's demand for Japanese mercenaries and weaponry, large quantities of swords were imported from the famous swordsmithing region of Sakai, who were in turn modified into more familiar Thai-style swords and spears. Many of these swords are now on display in the Grand Palace's Weapon Museum in Bangkok. In return, Japan bought pottery, pelts (including deer), shark skin, and betel leaf, a spice. Pelts, in particular, were the largest exported good to Japan; in the early Edo period, more than 200,000 animal skin products were shipped to Japan. The Japanese were noted by the Dutch for challenging the trade monopoly of the Dutch East India Company later on.

=== Christianity in the enclave ===
Japanese Christians made up a particularly large portion of the settlement in response to the Shogunate's persecution of Christians, as Ayutthaya had very little religious restriction. Portuguese missionary António Francisco Cardim, who visited the community, said to have performed sacraments to around 400 Japanese Christians in 1627.

=== Disestablishment ===
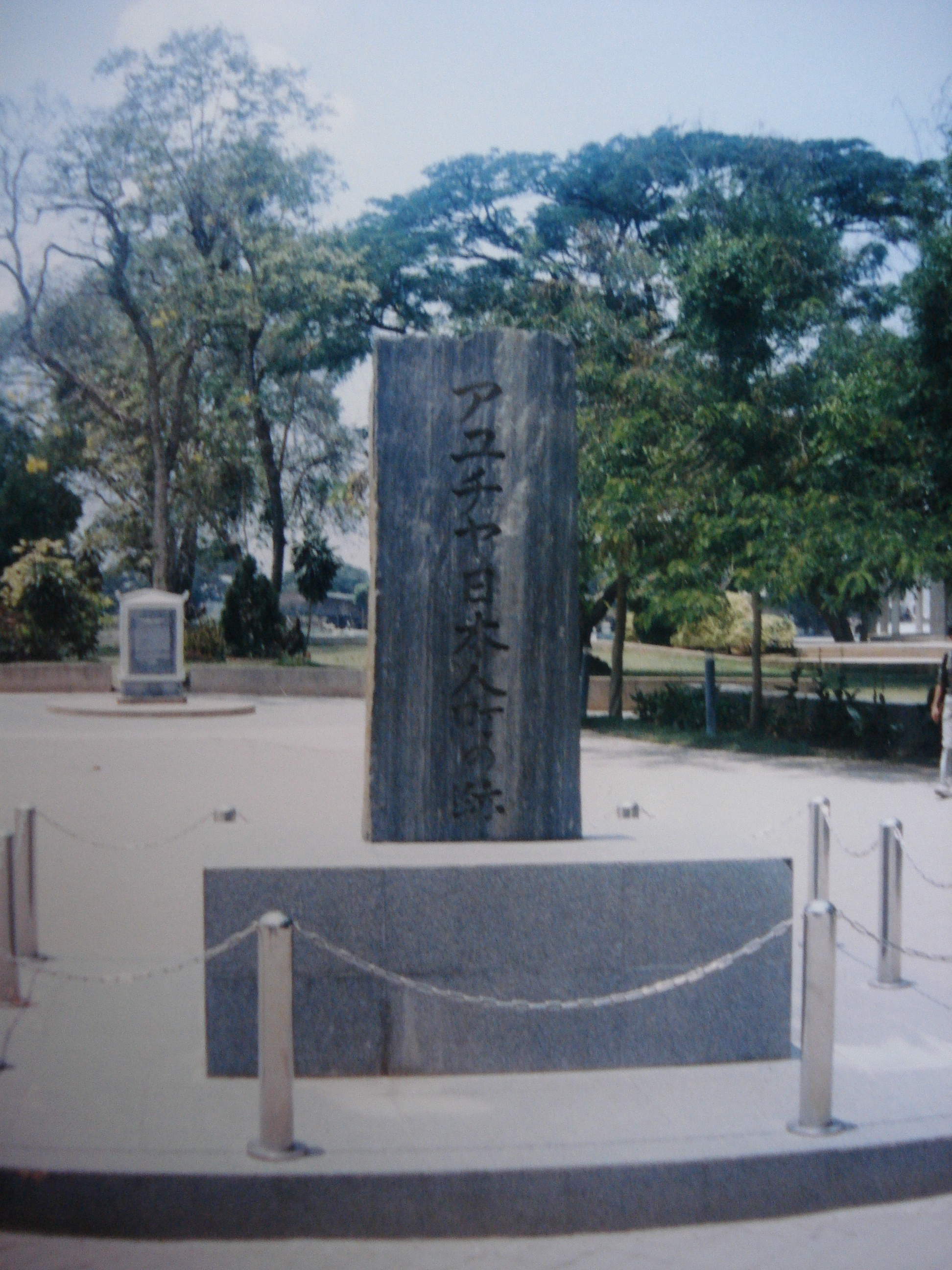
Thai monument to the former Japanese settlement

In 1629, King Prasat Thong attempted to cut back on Japanese influence by changing trade regulations. Yamada Nagamasa, who was the leader of Ban Yipun at the time and opposed Prasat Thong's coronation, was sent away to be the governor of Nakhon Si Thammarat after seeing the strong opposition of his power by other Siamese officials. The settlement saw a very dramatic end in 1630 when Nagamasa was assassinated, the settlement was burned, and residents Japanese were killed by Siam soldier and Sheikh Ahmad, under the pretense of "rebellious activity". Many Japanese fled into the nearby Khmer Empire.

In 1633, some 400 Japanese were able to re-establish the settlement in Ayutthaya. The shogun issued the Sakoku Ordinance to the Nagasaki bugyō (officials that were in charge of Japanese affairs in Southeast Asia), which prohibited people from immigrating to Southeast Asia, and ordering expatriate Japanese to move back to Japan. This ordnance was issued out of fear of international conflict. As new travels were cut off, Japanese influence and their numbers diminished as well. Having lost their military and power status, the Japanese began to work as brokers or tin merchants (which was abundant in South Thailand). The revived Ban Yipun is said to have existed well into the 18th century, though both the settlement and its inhabitants gradually assimilated into the Thai population.

=== Current status ===
There are no remnants of Japanese buildings in the current site of Ban Yipun, though in its place is a memorial park with a small museum and a monument in remembrance. A Japanese guide is stationed at a travel agency to use this park for package tour courses. The museum displays a small number of books sent from Japan during the Edo period, along with other artifacts.

=== Gallery ===
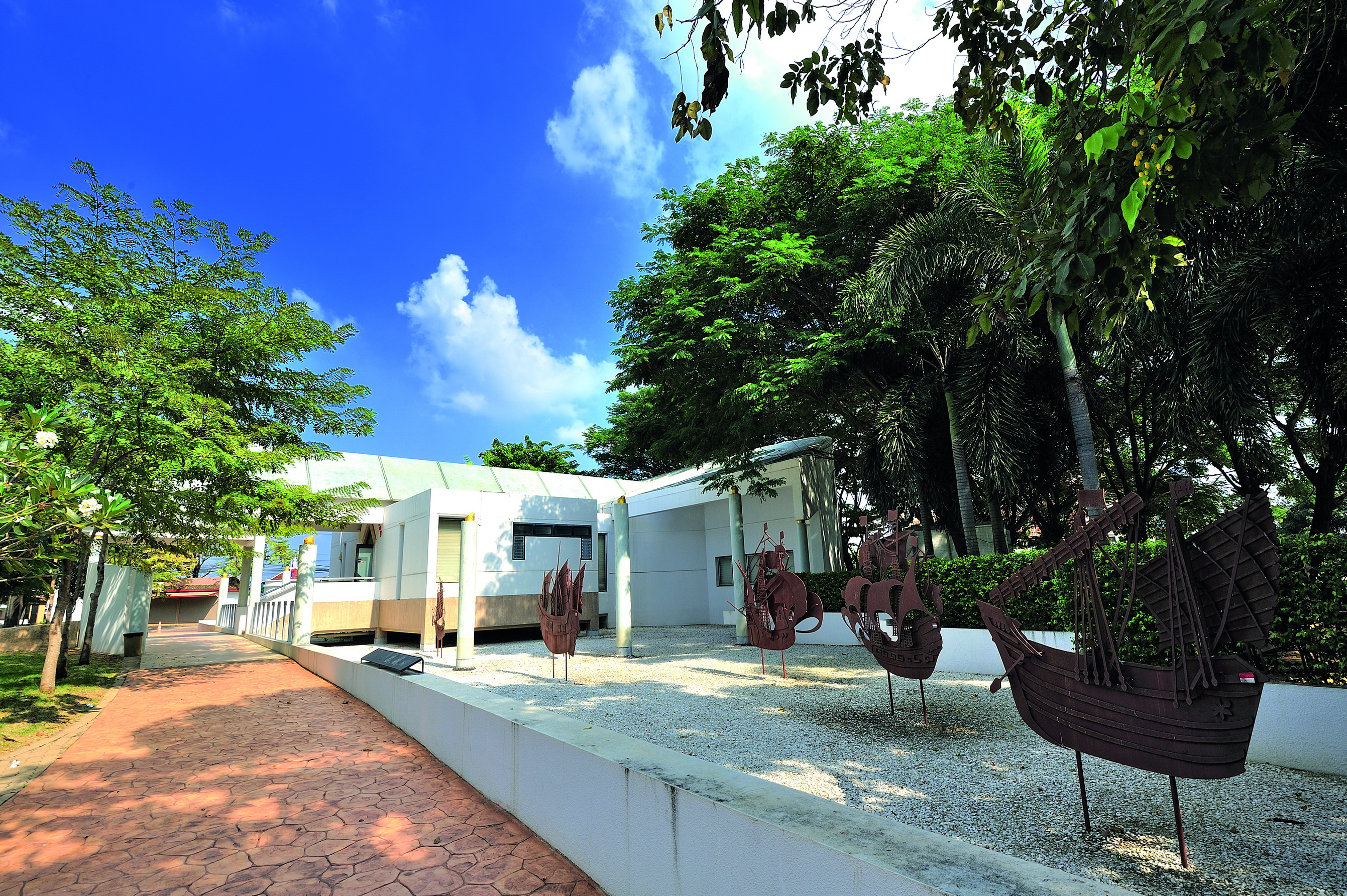

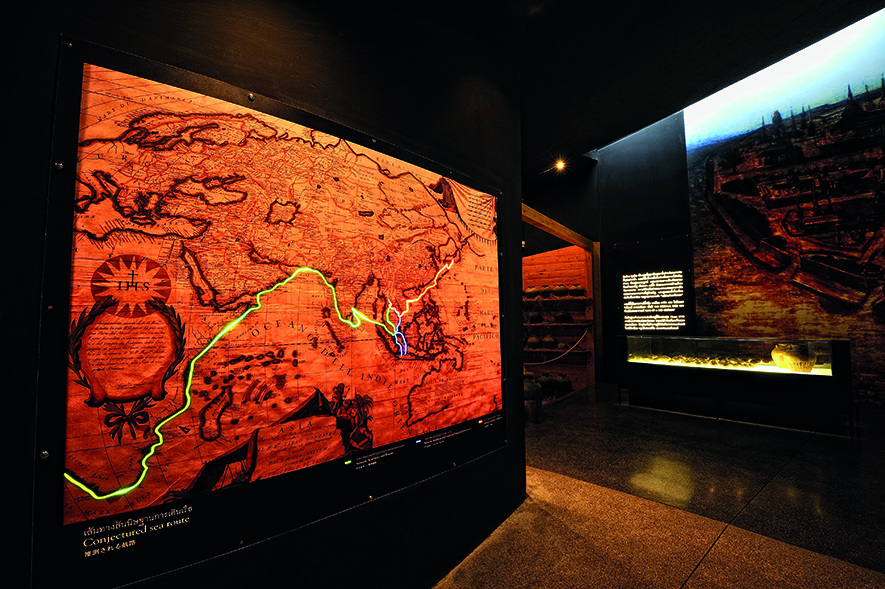

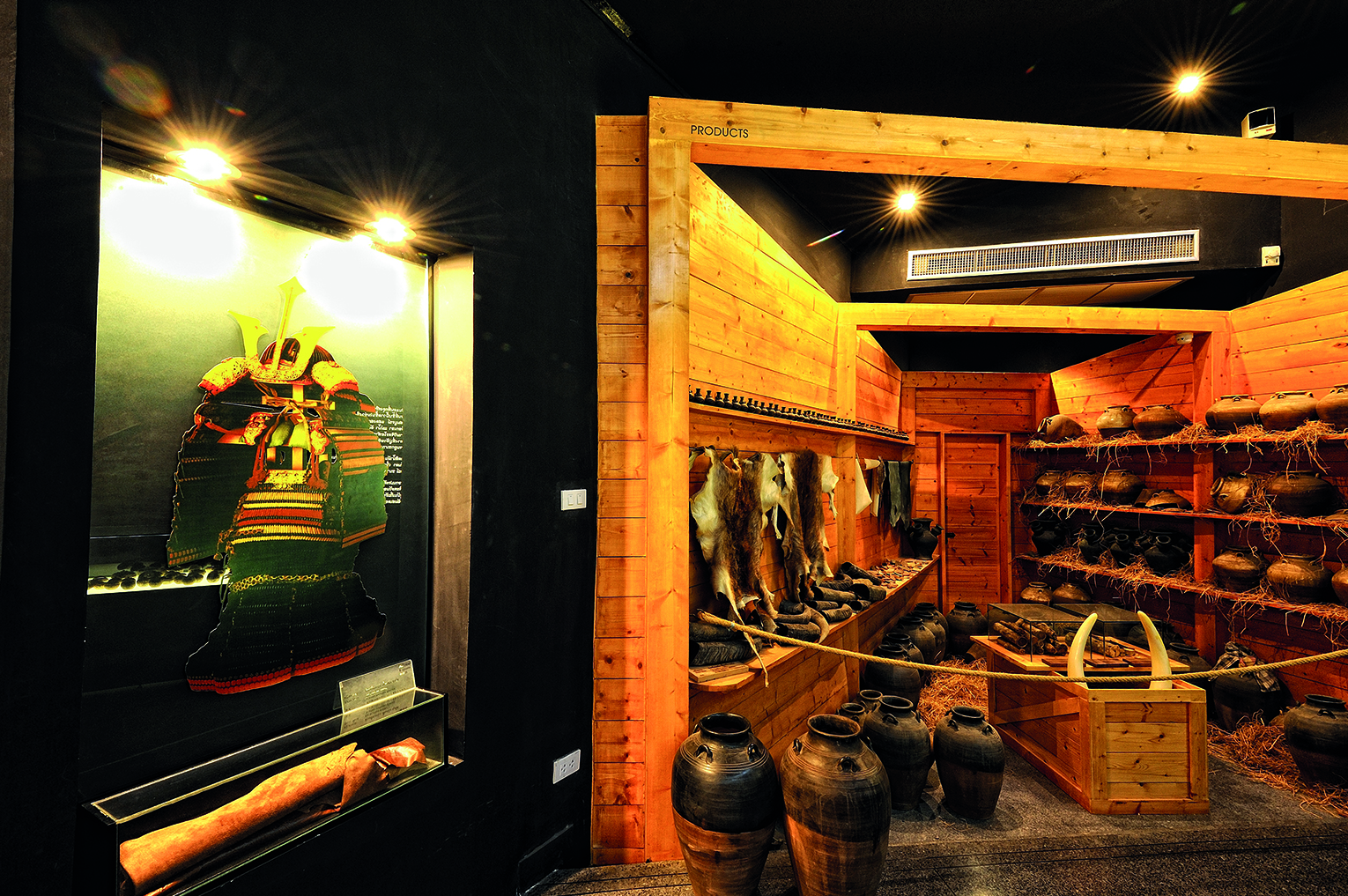
