= Yamada Nagamasa =

Japanese adventurer in the Ayutthaya Kingdom

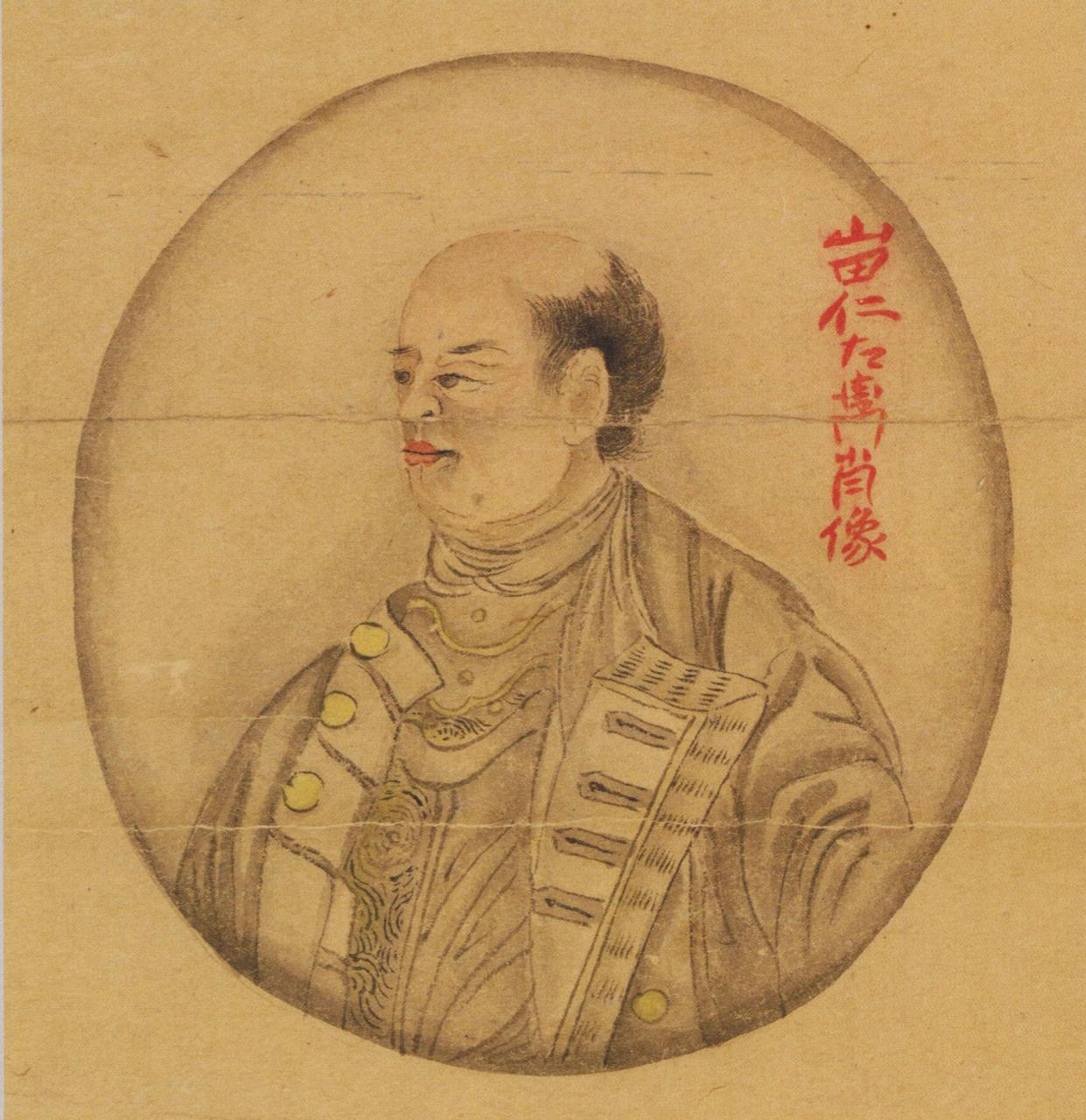
- Portrait of Yamada Nagamasa circa 1630
- Native name: 山田 長政
- Born: 1590; Numazu, Shizuoka, Japan
- Died: 1630 (aged 39–40) Ligor, Nakhon Si Thammarat, Ayutthaya Kingdom
- Allegiance: Japan; Ayutthaya Kingdom
- Rank: Okya

Yamada Nagamasa (Japanese: 山田 長政; 1590–1630) or Okya Senaphimuk (Thai: ออกญาเสนาภิมุข) was a Japanese adventurer who gained considerable influence in the Ayutthaya Kingdom at the beginning of the 17th century and became the governor of Nakhon Si Thammarat, which is on the Malay Peninsula in present-day Southern Thailand.

From 1617 until his death in 1630, Yamada Nagamasa was head of the Thai village referred to as Ban Yipun ('Japanese village') in the Thai language. This village was within the city of Ayutthaya (the capital city of the Ayutthaya Kingdom). Ban Yipun was home to roughly 1,000 Japanese citizens and was headed by a Japanese chief who was nominated by Ayutthayan authorities. Its inhabitants were a combination of traders, Christian converts who had fled their home country following the persecutions of Toyotomi Hideyoshi and Tokugawa Ieyasu and rōnin (unemployed former samurai) who had been on the losing side at the Battle of Sekigahara (1600) or the Siege of Osaka (1614–15). The Christian community seems to have been in the hundreds, as described by Padre António Francisco Cardim, who recounted having administered sacraments to around 400 Japanese Christians in 1627 in the city of Ayutthaya.

== Early life ==
Yamada Nagamasa was born in Numazu, Shizuoka in 1590. He is said to have been a palanquin bearer for the lord of Numazu. He became involved in Japanese trade activities with Southeast Asia during the period of the red seal ships and settled in the Ayutthaya Kingdom (modern-day southern Thailand) around 1612.

== Career ==
Yamada Nagamasa is alleged to have carried on the business of a privateer from 1620, attacking and plundering Dutch ships in and around Batavia (present-day Jakarta). Stories of Yamada burying his treasure on the east coast of Australia (and in particular, Magnetic Island off Townsville) persist but it is highly unlikely that Yamada would have ventured into that area as there were no trade routes in this region and the only ships to venture there were the ones blown off course during the summer storms. Furthermore, Yamada would have passed thousands of islands in the Torres Strait and Coral Sea and these would have provided safekeeping for any treasure and avoided a very long recovery voyage in the future.

The Ban Yipun colony was active in trade, particularly in the export of deer hide to Japan in exchange for Japanese silver and handicrafts (Japanese swords, Japanese lacquerware, high-quality papers). The Japanese were noted by the Dutch for challenging the trade monopoly of the Dutch East India Company (Vereenigde Oost-Indische Compagnie). The colony also had an important military role in the Ayutthaya Kingdom.

== Military involvement and lordship ==
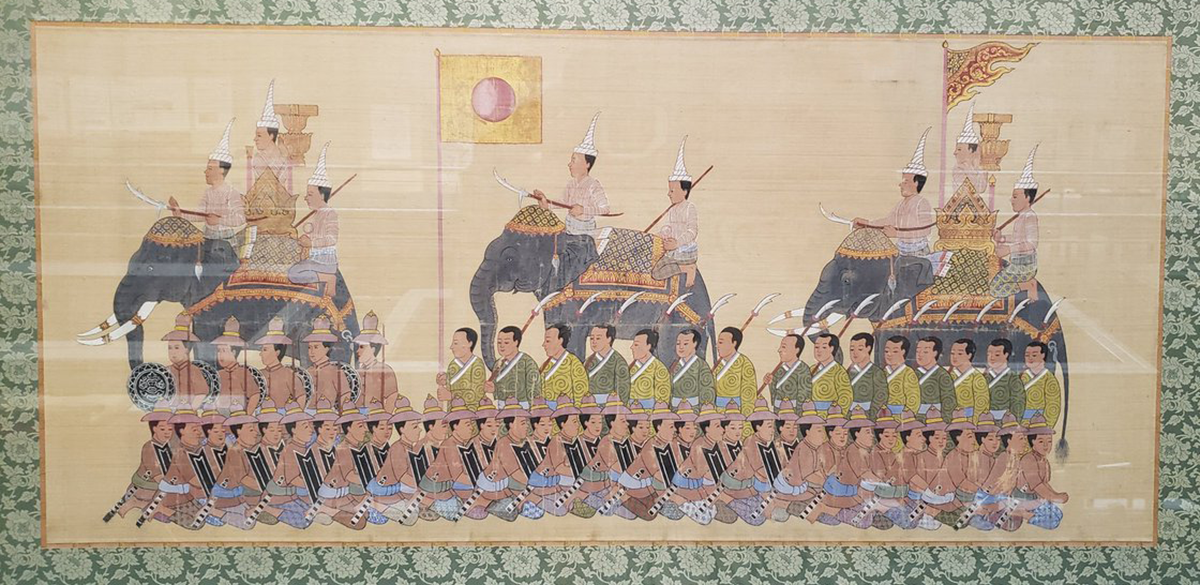
The army of Yamada Nagamasa in the Ayutthaya Kingdom

The Japanese colony was highly valued for its military expertise, and was organized under a "Department of Japanese Volunteers" (Krom Asa Yipun) by the King of Ayutthaya.

In the space of 15 years, Yamada Nagamasa rose from the low Thai nobility rank of Khun to the senior of Okya, his title becoming Okya Senaphimuk (ออกญาเสนาภิมุข). He became the head of the Japanese colony, and in this position supported the military campaigns of King Songtham, at the head of a Japanese army flying the Japanese flag. He fought successfully, and was finally nominated to Ligor (modern Nakhon Si Thammarat), in the southern peninsula in 1630, accompanied by 300 samurai.

== Travels between Siam and Japan ==
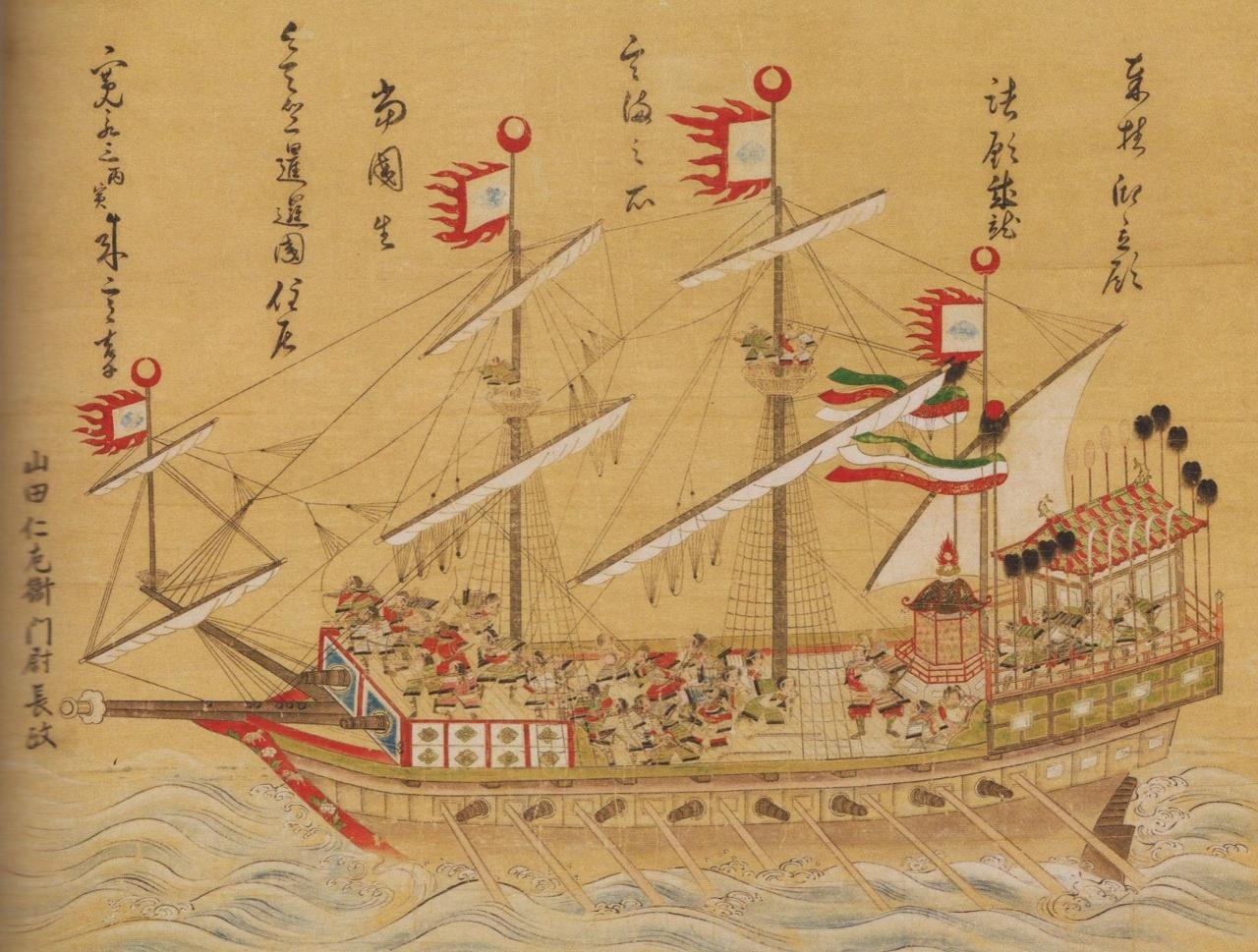
Yamada Nagamasa's warship, 17th-century painting

After more than 12 years in Siam, Yamada Nagamasa went to Japan in 1624 on board one of his ships, where he sold a cargo of Siamese deer hide in Nagasaki. He stayed in Japan for three years, trying to obtain a Red Seal permit, but finally left in 1627, with the simple status of a foreign ship.

In 1626, Nagamasa offered a painting of one of his warships to a temple of his hometown in Shizuoka. That painting itself was lost in a fire, but a copy remains to this day. It portrays a ship with Western-style rigging, 18 cannons, and sailors in samurai gear. Nagamasa returned to Siam in 1627.

In 1628, one of his ships transporting rice from Ayutthaya to Malacca was seized by a Dutch warship blockading the city. The ship was released once the identity of the owner became clear, since the Dutch knew that Yamada was held in great respect by the King of Siam, and they did not wish to enter into a diplomatic conflict. Yamada was also valued by the Dutch as a supplier of deer hide, and they invited him to trade more with Batavia.

== Death ==
In 1629, Yamada Nagamasa visited Japan with a delegation from King Songtham.

He soon travelled back to Siam, but became involved in a succession war following the death of the King Songtham by Prasat Thong. Prasat Thong had acted as "king-maker" before assuming the throne, by performing the double regicide of King Songtham's sons. Yamada or Okya Seniphimok, heard of the coup at Ayutthaya and rebelled. Prasat Thong had Praya Chaiya poison him in 1630, and then expelled the remaining Japanese.

== End of relations between Siam and Japan ==
Following Yamada's death in 1630, the new ruler and usurper king of Siam Prasat Thong (1630–1655) sent an army of 4,000 Siam soldiers, killing 500 Japanese civilians and destroying the Japanese settlement in Ayutthaya, but many Japanese managed to flee to the Khmer Kingdom. A few years later in 1633, returnees (300–400 Japanese) from Indochina were able to re-establish the Japanese settlement in Ayutthaya.

From 1634, the shōgun, informed of these troubles and what he perceived as attacks on his authority, refused to issue further Red Seal ship permits for Siam.

Desirous to renew trade, however, the king of Siam sent a trading ship and an embassy to Japan in 1636, but the embassies were rejected by the shogun, thus putting an end to direct relations between Japan and Siam. Japan was concomitantly closing itself to the world at that time, a period known as Sakoku.

The Dutch took advantage of the Japanese withdrawal, increasing their trade and offering naval support. Japan lost influence for 300 years after being expelled by Prasat Thong.

== Memorial ==
Yamada now rests in his hometown in the area of Otani. The remnants of the Japanese quarters in Ayutthuya are still visible to visitors, as well as a statue of Yamada in Siamese military uniform.

== Film adaptations of Yamada's life ==
- The Gaijin (山田長政 王者の剣) – 1959
- Southern Cross: The Strange Tale of Cornelia Oyuki and Nagamasa Yamada (南十字星 コルネリアお雪異聞 わたしの山田長政) (TV movie) – 1978
- Yamada: The Samurai of Ayothaya – 2010

== See also ==
- Iwamoto Chizuna
