= Chaya Shirōjirō =

Series of influential Japanese merchants

Chaya Shirōjirō (茶屋四郎次郎) was the name of a series of wealthy and influential Kyoto-based merchants who took part in the red-seal trade licensed under the Tokugawa shogunate. Members of the Chaya family, they were also centrally involved in the country's production and trade in textiles. Along with the Suminokura and Gotō families, the Chaya were one of the top merchant families in Edo period Kyoto.

== Chaya Shirōjirō Kiyonobu (1545–1596) ==
Chaya Shirōjirō Kiyonobu (1545–1596), likely the first of the line, was the son of a rōnin of the Nakajima family, descended from lords of a territory in Owari province. His father, a friend of Shōgun Ashikaga Yoshiteru, was crippled in the wars of the Sengoku period. Adopted into the Chaya family, he established a humble business in Kyoto making drapes. He developed a strong business relationship with one of his clients, Matsudaira Hirotada, and later sent his son Chaya Shirōjirō Kiyonobu to Mikawa province to serve as a squire to Hirotada's son, now known as Tokugawa Ieyasu.

Kiyonobu thus became one of the primary suppliers of the Tokugawa family, and quickly came into great wealth and influence in Kyoto. He accompanied Ieyasu in battle, at both the Mikatagahara (1573), and served him in other ways, as an intelligence agent in Kyoto and in secretly transporting messages and goods for Ieyasu during the time when Toyotomi Hideyoshi held power. He obtained a red-seal license (shuinjō) from Hideyoshi, permitting him to trade in the ports of southern Vietnam, where he obtained silks and other goods. Chaya was supposedly the one who informed Ieyasu of Oda Nobunaga's death in 1582, and thus allowed him to escape the forces of Akechi Mitsuhide and Hideyoshi, who seized power in the aftermath.

He is said to have helped design the layout of the city of Edo, and for his last year or so of life, did not leave Ieyasu's side. He repeatedly refused formal posts as governor of various Tokugawa lands, insisting that he was not a soldier, and was granted a stipend of 200 koku instead.

== Chaya Shirōjirō Kiyotada (1584–1603) ==
Following Kiyonobu's death in 1596, his son Kiyotada took over the family business, and succeeded his father in his relationship with the Tokugawa lord. Kiyotada fought at the battle of Sekigahara (1600), and soon afterward was made head of all the merchants in the Kansai region, "with particular jurisdiction over the business community of Kyoto".

However, Kiyotada died young, in 1603, at the age of nineteen.

== Chaya Shirōjirō Kiyotsugu (1584–1622) ==
Thus, with the patronage of the shogunate behind them, the remaining brothers Kiyotsugu (1584–1622), Michizumi, and Nobumune took over the Chaya family business, worked to monopolize the trade in raw silk, and served as official suppliers of a variety of goods to the shogunate. Kiyotsugu was assigned by Ieyasu to help oversee shogunal operations at the formal trading post in Nagasaki, where he could keep an eye on the foreign traders and Christian missionaries, while working to his own commercial benefit as well.

A friend of artist Honami Kōetsu, Kiyotsugu was active socially in the Kyoto art world, and was known as both a patron of the arts in general, and a collector of tea bowls and other implements of the Japanese tea ceremony.

Beginning in 1612, the family obtained official licenses (shuinjō) from the shogunate to continue trade with Cochinchina (a.k.a. Dang Trong, present-day southern Vietnam); these merchant vessels thus came to be known as chaya-sen (茶屋船, "Chaya ships").

== Later generations ==
Chaya Shirōjirō Kagayoshi and Koshirō Munekiyo, heads of the family several generations later, continued to serve the shogunate, and expanded the family business, establishing branches in Kii and Owari provinces. The family suffered after the imposition of maritime restrictions by the shogunate in the 1630s, which put an end to the Annam trade, but continued to earn significant profits as core members of the itowappu system by which they enjoyed oligopolistic privileges in the silk trade.

The family suffered heavy losses in 1655, as did the other itowappu merchants; the system was abolished the same year, but was later re-established in 1685. The family's fortunes continued to wane as, by 1700, it lost its special relationship with the shogunate, which could now obtain cheaper textiles from Edo-based merchants.

== Notes ==
- Nussbaum, Louis-Frédéric and Käthe Roth. (2005). Japan encyclopedia. Cambridge: Harvard University Press. ISBN 978-0-674-01753-5; OCLC 58053128
- Sansom, George (1963). "A History of Japan: 1615–1867." Stanford, California: Stanford University Press. ISBN 978-0-8047-0527-1; OCLC 173092834
- Some of the material contained here is derived from that of the corresponding article on the Japanese Wikipedia.
