= Tenjiku Tokubei =

Japanese adventurer and writer

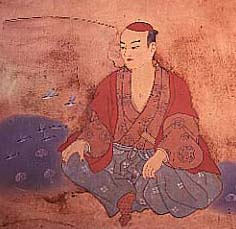
Tenjiku Tokubei, 17th-century painting.

Tenjiku Tokubei (1612 – c. 1692) (Japanese: 天竺徳兵衛) was a Japanese adventurer and writer of the early 17th century. He traveled to Southeast and South Asia, hence his "Tenjiku" (Japanese: 天竺, East Asian name of "India") nickname.

He was born in Sendo-machi, Takasago-cho, in today's Hyōgo Prefecture in 1612. His father was a salt wholesaler.

== As an adventurer ==
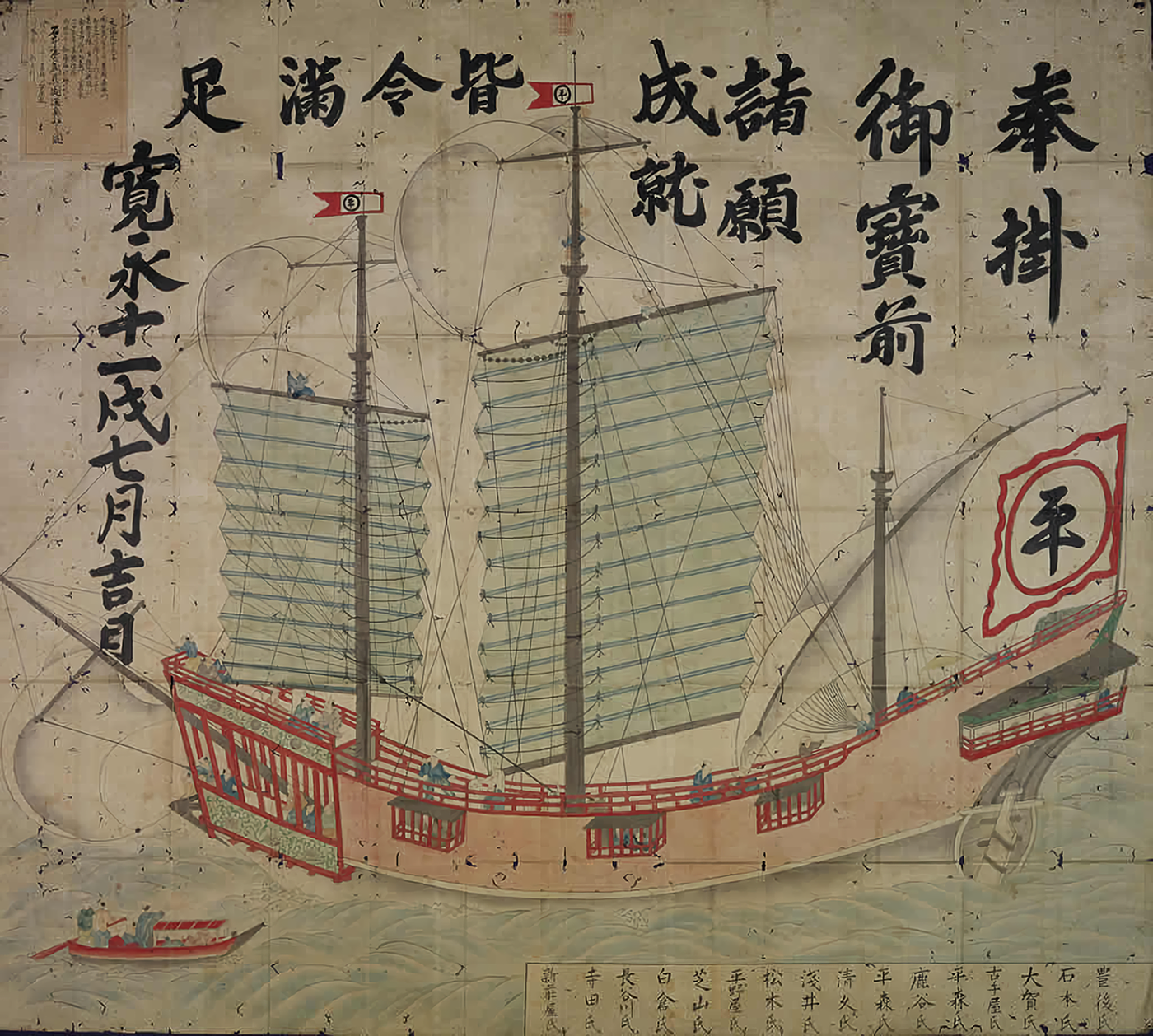
A 1634 Japanese red seal ship. Tokyo Naval Science Museum.

At the age of fifteen, in 1626, Tokubei was hired by a trading company in Kyoto. He pursued commercial activities aboard Japanese red seal ships.

In 1627, Tokubei visited China, Vietnam, and Siam (modern Thailand) on board a Japanese Red Seal ship. He would stay for some time in Siam and again visit the country on board one of the ships of the Dutch adventurer Jan Joosten van Lodensteijn. He also sailed to India, to the source of the Ganges, and the country of Magadha, and returned with great wealth and numerous stories to tell.

Upon his return to Japan, and after the introduction of the Seclusion policy (sakoku), Tokubei wrote an essay titled "Tenjiku Tokai Monogatari" (天竺渡海物語, literally "The Tale of Crossing the Sea to India") on his adventures in foreign countries, which became very popular in Japan.

He died around the age of 80 in his home town of Takasago.

== As a Kabuki character ==
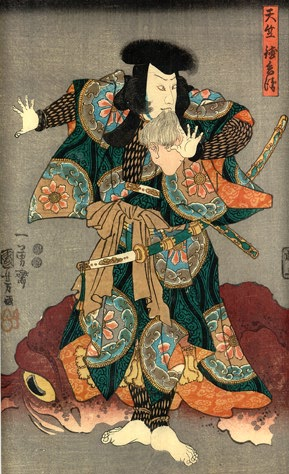
Tenjiku Tokubei in Kabuki, 18th century woodcut.

Tenjiku Tokubei became a popular character of Kabuki and Joruri puppet dramas, where he was given the role of a magician. He was a popular subject of woodcut prints in the 18th and 19th centuries.

In September 1795, Sawamura Kunitaro I played the role of Tokubei's wife in the drama "Tenjiku Tokubei Kikigaki Ôrai", while the role of Tenjiku Tokubei was played by Arashi Koroku III.
