= Iwamoto Chizuna =

Japanese soldier, businessman, and adventurer (1858 – 1920)

- 岩本 千綱
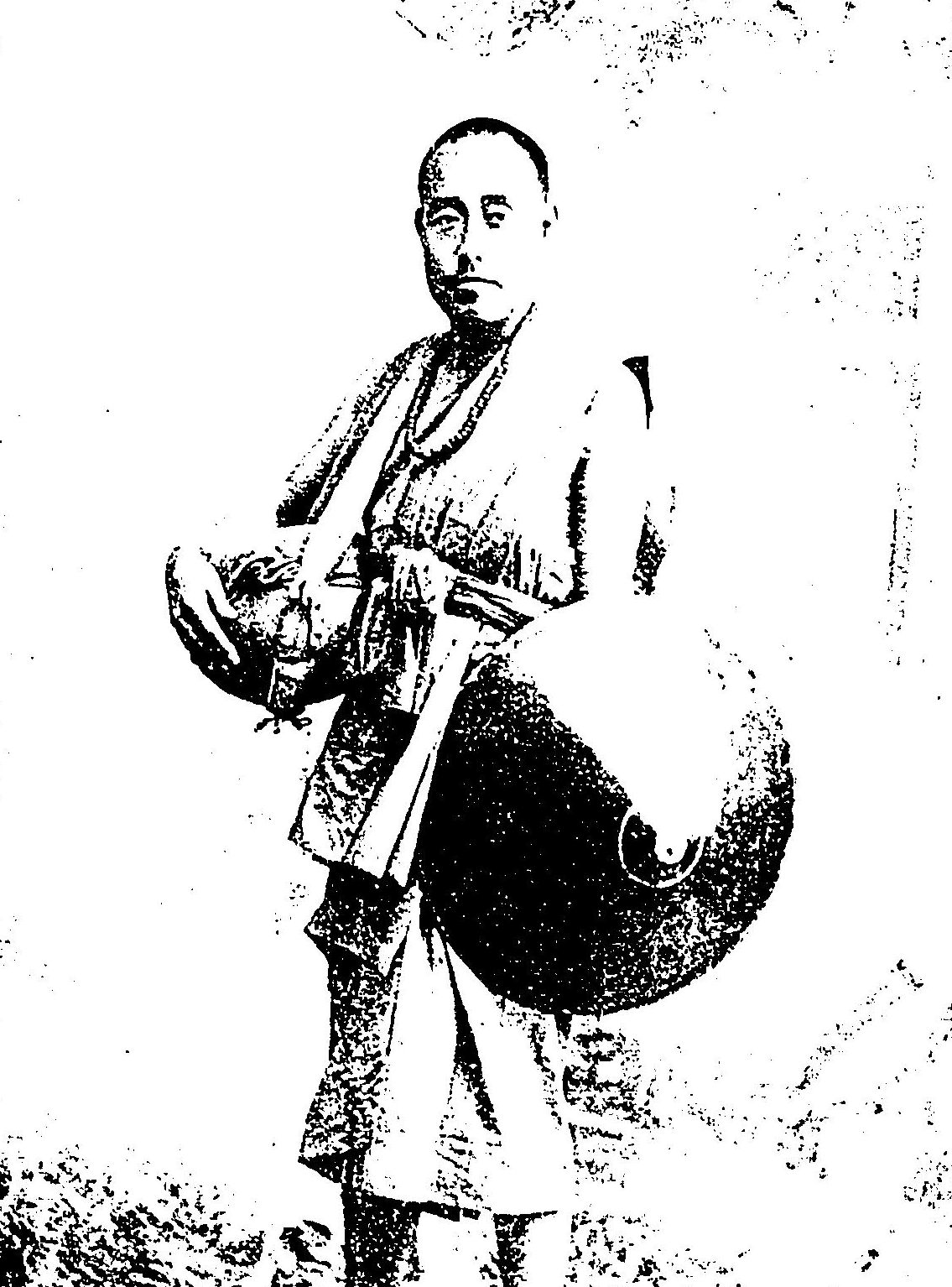

Personal details
- Born: 1858 Kōchi, Tosa Domain, Tosa Province, Japan
- Died: 1920 (aged 61–62) Japan

Military service
- Allegiance: Imperial Japanese Army
- Years of service: 1879-1887

Iwamoto Chizuna (Japanese: 岩本 千綱; 1858–1920) was a Japanese soldier and adventurer.

== Biography ==
Iwamoto Chizuna was born into a samurai family in 1858.

In 1879, Iwamoto graduated from the Imperial Japanese Army Academy and eventually achieved the rank of first lieutenant (中尉, chūi). In 1887, he was discharged from the Army on account of his association with members of the Freedom and People's Rights Movement including Inukai Tsuyoshi.

In 1892, he moved to Siam and devoted himself to encouraging economic and cultural ties between Japan and Siam. He also visited Luang Phrabang.

Iwamoto and the pan-Asianist Ishibashi Usaburō founded the Siam Colonization Society (暹羅植民協会, Shamu Shokumin Kyōkai) with financial support from the fervently pro-Japanese Chaophraya Surasakmontri. The society was later reorganized as the Siam Colonization Company (暹羅植民会社, Shamu Shokumin Kaisha). According to Ishibashi, the long-term goals of the company included, among other things, "establish[ing] a latent Japanese influence [in Siam]" and "install[ing] Japanese in the Siamese government".

Before Iwamoto returned home to recruit Japanese peasants for the colonization project, Surasakmontri gave him a golden sword to be sharpened in Japan. The Siam Colonization Company ended in disaster with many of the Japanese immigrants winding up dead or enslaved as coolies. In large part, the failure of the colonization project has been attributed to Iwamoto's inept and irresponsible leadership.

In 1897, Iwamoto published a book about his travels — A True Account of an Expedition to the Three Countries of Siam, Laos, and Annam (暹羅老檛安南三国探検実記, Shamu-Raosu-An'nan Sangoku Tanken Jikki). He died in 1920.

== See also ==
- Yamada Nagamasa
