= Nihonmachi =

Term used for historical Japanese communities in Southeast and East Asia

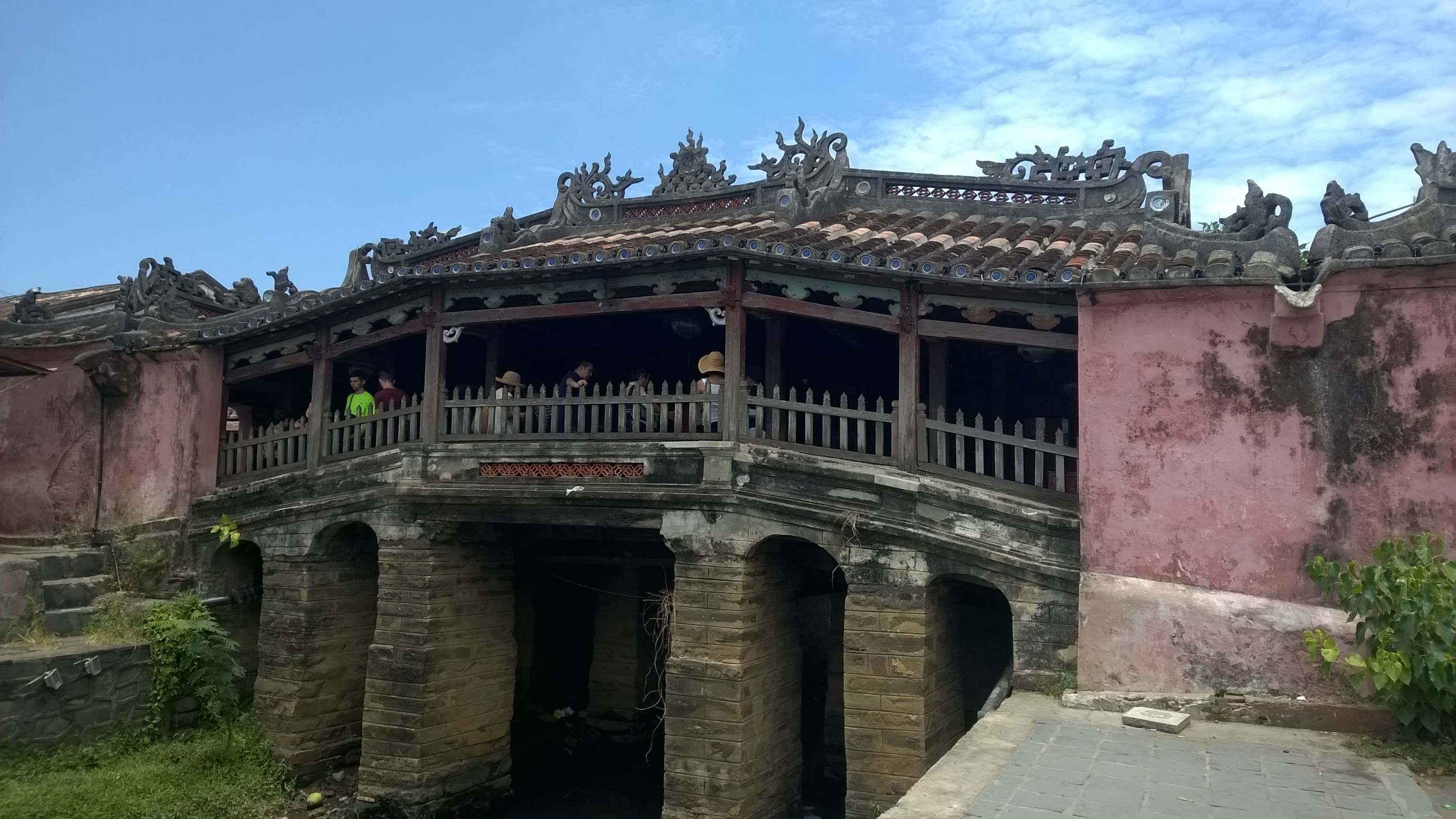
The Japanese Covered Bridge was created by the Nihonmachi in Hội An, Vietnam.

Nihonmachi (日本町/日本街; lit. "Japan town" or "Japan street") is a term used to refer to historical Japanese communities in Southeast and East Asia. The term has come to also be applied to several modern-day communities, though most of these are called simply "Japantown", in imitation of the common term "Chinatown".

== History ==
For a brief period in the 16th–17th centuries, Japanese overseas activity and presence in Southeast Asia and elsewhere in the region boomed. Sizeable Japanese communities, known as Nihonmachi, could be found in many of the major ports and political centers of the region, where they exerted significant political and economic influence.

The Japanese had been active on the seas and across the region for centuries, traveling for commercial, political, religious, and other reasons. The 16th century, however, saw a dramatic increase in such travel and activity. The internal strife of the Sengoku period caused a great many people, primarily samurai, commoner merchants, and Christian refugees to seek their fortunes across the seas. Many of the samurai who fled Japan around this time were those who stood on the losing sides of various major conflicts. Some were rōnin, some veterans of the Japanese invasions of Korea, or of various other major conflicts. As Toyotomi Hideyoshi, and later the Tokugawa shōguns, issued repeated bans on Christianity, many fled the country. A significant portion of those settled in Catholic Manila.

As a result of the Ming dynasty's ban on direct Sino-Japanese trade or travel, the various lands of Southeast Asia became the primary destinations. Beginning in 1567, the ban was lifted for trade and contact in Southeast Asia, and many traders who would otherwise have been deemed pirates for their violation of the ban were thus able to engage in legal activity, though trade and travel directly between China and Japan remained illegal. These factors combined with a number of others to create a vibrant trading scene across East and Southeast Asia, a period which Southeast Asian historian Anthony Reid has dubbed "the Age of Commerce."

Japanese abroad worked in a myriad of roles, though most were merchants, mercenaries, sailors, soldiers, servants, or manual laborers of various sorts. The establishment of the red seal ships system by Toyotomi Hideyoshi in the 1590s, and its continuation under Tokugawa Ieyasu in the early decades of the 17th century, caused this trade and overseas activity to reach a climax and enter a golden age. Through these maritime adventurers and overseas communities, Japanese entrepôt trade in Southeast Asia thrived. Many of the more active ports came to have a port master, or head of the Japanese community. This port master, called syahbandar in Malay and Indonesia, oversaw the activities of the residents of the Nihonmachi, served as a liaison between the community and the local authorities, and played an important role in coordinating the port's trade with non-resident Japanese traders who came to the port.

For roughly three decades, Japanese communities across Southeast Asia thrived. This came to an end, however, in the 1630s, as the Tokugawa shogunate began to impose maritime restrictions. In 1635, Japanese were banned from travelling abroad, and from returning to Japan from overseas. Some of these Southeast Asian Nihonmachi survived through the end of the 17th century. Japan's foreign trade was now handled exclusively by Chinese, Dutch, and Southeast Asian ships, but Japanese living abroad continued to play important commercial roles and, in some cases, to exert considerable influence upon the economies of a number of ports. Still, by the end of the 17th century, the lack of influx of new Japanese immigrants led these communities to either disappear through assimilation into the peoples of their new homes, or to die out entirely.

== Communities ==
During this brief but vibrant period, Japanese communities (Nihonmachi) existed in many of the major ports and political centers of the region, including Batavia in the Dutch East Indies, Hội An in Nguyễn, southern Viet Nam, Manila in the Captaincy General of the Philippines of Spanish East Indies, and Phnom Penh in Cambodia.

An important and significant Nihonmachi is that of Paco in Manila, where the famous Christian Samurai General Takayama and his wife, children, and descendants lived. The exiled daimyo was known for his military prowess and served with Oda Nobunaga and Ieyasu Tokugawa.

The largest, and perhaps most famous, Nihonmachi of the period was that in the Siamese port city and royal capital of Ayutthaya, whose head, Yamada Nagamasa, bore prominent posts and titles in the royal court. Yamada led an army of 700 Japanese, and took part in suppressing rebellions, civil wars, and succession disputes. He was also allowed to control monopolies over particular goods, such as deerskin, and was given at least nominal governorship of a few provinces at various points.

On the other end of the spectrum, though the port of Tonkin in northern Vietnam played an important role in the region's silk trade, the local Trinh authorities actively discouraged the formation of a Nihonmachi there. This is believed to have largely been the result of concerns over the martial nature of the Japanese in the region (many were samurai serving as pirates and mercenaries), and over the shipments of weapons and munitions from Japan to Siam and southern Vietnam. In order to avoid potential violence within their chief port, the Trịnh Lords sought to avoid any significant permanent Japanese presence, though many notable and prominent Japanese merchants did frequently make port there.

=== Paco, Manila ===
The Japanese established a Nihonmachi quite early at Dilao, a suburb of Manila in the Spanish Philippines, where they numbered between 300 and 400 in 1593. The statue of its famous resident, Dom Justo Takayama or Takayama, a Japanese Catholic kirishitan daimyō and samurai, can be found there. In 1603, during the Sangley rebellion, they numbered 1,500, and 3,000 in 1606.

Paco was known as Dilao because of the Amaryllis plants that were once plentiful in this district. Dilao or dilaw is a Tagalog word for the color yellow. Some sources say it was named Dilao or "Yellow Plaza" by the Spanish settlers because of the Japanese migrants who lived there, describing their physiognomy. Spanish Franciscan missionaries founded the town of Paco as early as 1580.

The name Dilao was used until 1791, when the name San Fernando was added, making it San Fernando de Dilao. In the 19th century, the town of San Fernando de Dilao was given the nickname of Paco (which means Francisco). Paco, along with Sampaloc, Santa Ana, San Juan del Monte, and San Pedro de Macati became the second largest districts that became part of Manila. It became to known as Paco de Dilao and eventually, as Paco as it is known today.

=== Ayutthaya ===
Ayutthaya (not far from present-day Bangkok, Thailand) is said to have had a Japanese settlement of about 1500, known in Thai as Ban Yipun, in the 1620s. The kingdom only began trading with Japan around 1570, though it had been actively engaged in commerce with the kingdom of Ryūkyū, a short distance to Japan's south, for over one hundred years. This time also marked the beginning of the Japanese community in Ayutthaya, among the most distant ports from Japan with which the Japanese traded in the early modern period. Japanese "adventurers", mostly ronin fleeing Japan and seeking their fortunes overseas, were welcomed by the kings of Ayutthaya, and more than a few were employed by the royal government as bodyguards, soldiers, and in other capacities. The kingdom engaged frequently in conflict with Burma, and many of these samurai soldiers served the court in battle. The kings also engaged in formal relations with the Tokugawa shōguns, receiving shipments of arms and munitions among many other trade items. By the 1620s, Japan was Ayutthaya's most major trading partner, as over twenty Japanese merchant houses, along with many independent adventurers and traders, engaged in commercial shipping between Ayutthaya and Nagasaki every year.

Trade and relations between Japan and Ayutthaya were quite friendly and strong for roughly sixty years, until a series of political scandals in 1630 led to the shogunate formally severing ties with the kingdom. Following the death of King Songtham, the throne was seized by Prasat Thong in a violent coup. As part of this scheme, Prasat Thong arranged for the head of the Nihonmachi, Yamada Nagamasa, who also served in prominent roles in court and as head of a contingent of royal Japanese bodyguards, to be killed. Fearing retribution from the Japanese community, the new king burnt down the Nihonmachi, expelling or killing most of the residents. Many Japanese fled to Cambodia, and a number returned several years later after having been granted amnesty by the king. The shogunate, regarding Prasat Thong as an usurper and a pretender to the throne, severed ties with the kingdom. Trade continued aboard Chinese and Dutch ships, and, though formal relations were not resumed following the ascension of King Narai to the throne in 1657, an event in which the Japanese community played a not insignificant part, the royal court's involvement in trade with Japan did resume.

The Nihonmachi recovered for a time, playing an important role in managing aspects of the Japanese trade at the port, and lasting through the end of the 17th century before becoming assimilated into the Siamese population and disappearing. Much of the city was destroyed when it was taken by the Burmese in 1767, and very little by way of intact buildings or other large, noticeable remnants remain today of the Nihonmachi. A formal marker, placed in modern times, denotes the site, which has been the subject of some archaeological research, and which has been visited by Japanese Emperors Akihito and his predecessor, Hirohito.

=== Hội An ===
Hội An, located a short distance from Da Nang, was the largest port in early modern Vietnam. The Japanese community there was quite small, consisting of only a few tens of households, in contrast both to the Japanese community of other cities such as Ayutthaya, and to the Chinese population of Hội An, which numbered in the thousands. Even so, the Japanese in the Nihonmachi of Hội An exerted a powerful influence upon the affairs of the trading port, the Japanese demand for silk being so great that the comings and goings of Japanese merchant ships every year caused dramatic cyclical shifts in market prices. On average, more than ten Japanese ships visited the port every year during the period of the "red seal ships", that is, between roughly 1590 and 1635. This represented fully a quarter of all Japanese maritime economic activity, more than that of any other individual port.

For several months every year, when the trade winds allowed Chinese and Japanese ships to arrive, a vibrant marketplace would appear in the port, and Chinese, Japanese, and Vietnamese merchants engaged in trading a wide variety of goods. Among other factors which contributed to its prosperity, Hội An was well-placed to serve as a neutral port where Chinese and Japanese could trade without violating the Ming hai jin ban. During the rest of the year, members of the Japanese community in the port city prepared for the market by gathering goods from Chinese and Vietnamese merchants according to the particular demands of the Japan-based merchants who would be arriving with the ships.

The first Dutch merchants arrived in the port in 1633, and were greeted by the head of the Nihonmachi. Though the shogunate would impose maritime restrictions in 1635, banning direct Japanese involvement in overseas trade, Dutch records indicate that for the few years which the Dutch and Japanese coexisted in Hội An, the Japanese completely dominated the port's economy. Even after 1635, Japanese were hesitant to deal with the Dutch, buying silks from the Chinese in such volume that the Dutch merchants were rarely able to purchase the amounts they desired, and had to face significantly higher prices resulting from the drastically reduced supply.

Over the course of the 17th century, the Japanese community in Hội An gradually shrank and disappeared, assimilated into the Vietnamese community. Intermarriage not only within the Nihonmachi, but between notable Japanese merchant families and the Nguyễn noble family, is indicated by contemporary records, grave markers, and various forms of anecdotal evidence. The descendants of several of these merchant families still hold today as heirlooms objects relating the families' connections to Vietnam.

Hội An today is a small and relatively unassuming city, its port having long since silted up, leading to a sharp decline in its economic prosperity and significance. The precise location of the Nihonmachi within the city remains unknown, though scholars continue to explore the subject, using both contemporary records and archaeological findings. The so-called "Japanese bridge", also known as Lai Vien Kieu ("Bridge of Friends from Afar"), remains one of the city's most famous sites and serves as a reminder of the Japanese community that once thrived there. Conventional wisdom seems to indicate that this bridge marks the entrance to the Nihonmachi's main street. However, the observation that the bridge is not constructed in a Japanese style has led a number of scholars to discount this idea.

== See also ==
- Dom Justo Takayama
- Ieyasu Tokugawa
- Oda Nobunaga
