= Battle of Dangpo (1604) =

1604 Japan–Korea naval battle

Second Battle of Dangpo (1604)
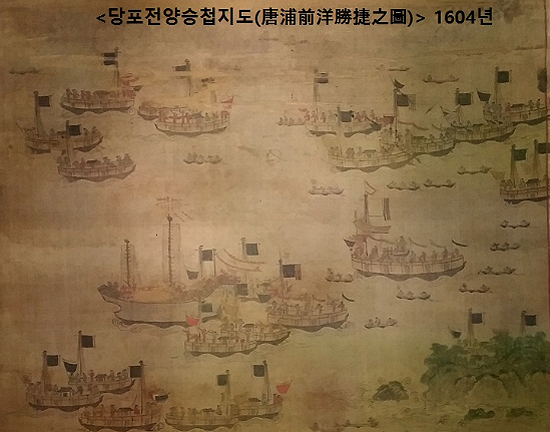
- Painting of the battle, 1604
Date	4–5 June or 14 June 1604 (~1 day)
Location	Dangpo, Tongyeong, Joseon
Result	Joseon victory

Belligerents
Joseon Korea	Tokugawa shogunate

Commanders and leaders
Shin Yeo-ryang; 28 other commanders	Tokugawa Ieyasu

Units involved
Panokseon; Hahoseon	Red seal ship

Strength
25 warships 15 smaller ships 233 soldiers	1 red ship 49 crew

Casualties and losses
Unknown	Most of the crew killed or captured

The Battle of Dangpo (1604) or the Dangpo incident was a naval engagement that occurred off the coast of Dangpo, Joseon (now in Tongyeong, South Korea), between the Korean navy and a Red Seal Ship.

== Background ==
On June 14, 1604, a mysterious ship approached the coast of Dangpo, Tongyeong, where Korea's naval headquarters were located. The ship was an armed Japanese trading vessel, dispatched by Tokugawa Ieyasu to establish trade relations with Cambodia. Its crew consisted of 16 Chinese, 31 Japanese, a Portuguese merchant (João Mendes), and a black crew member. Following a storm, the vessel drifted into Korean waters. The Korean navy, still on high alert after the Imjin War, viewed the ship's presence as a threat. When initial efforts to communicate and requests of a peaceful surrender with the crew failed, tensions escalated, leading to the deployment of Korean warships.

== Battle ==
The engagement began on June 4 or June 14, 1604, with 25 Korean warships, led by commander Shin Yeo-ryang, surrounding the Japanese vessel. Korean ships, primarily Panokseon, launched an attack involving fire arrows and artillery bombardment. Despite their size and firepower, the Japanese crew resisted fiercely, relying on muskets and melee combat. However, the superior Korean navy gradually overwhelmed the enemy. After more than 24 hours of fighting, Korean sailors boarded the Japanese ship, subdued the crew, and captured the vessel and most of its crew.

== Aftermath ==
Surviving crew members were taken prisoner and later interrogated. Recognizing the Chinese ownership of the ship, the Korean government repatriated the survivors to China, earning commendation and a reward from the Ming court.
