= Red Seal ships =

1604–1635 Japanese armed merchant sailing ships

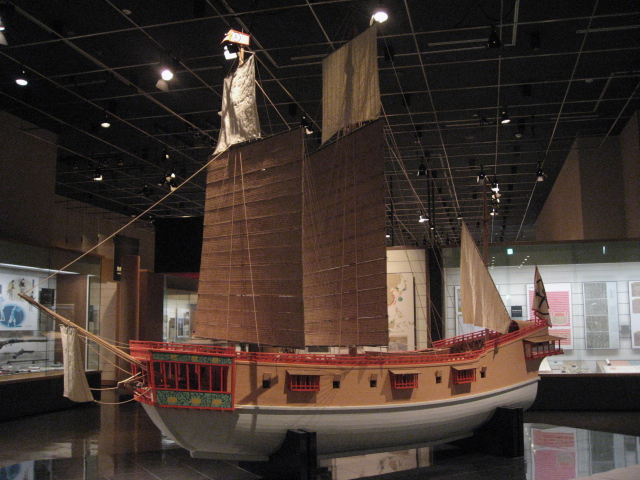
A modern scale model reconstruction of a Red Seal ship in the National Museum of Japanese History.

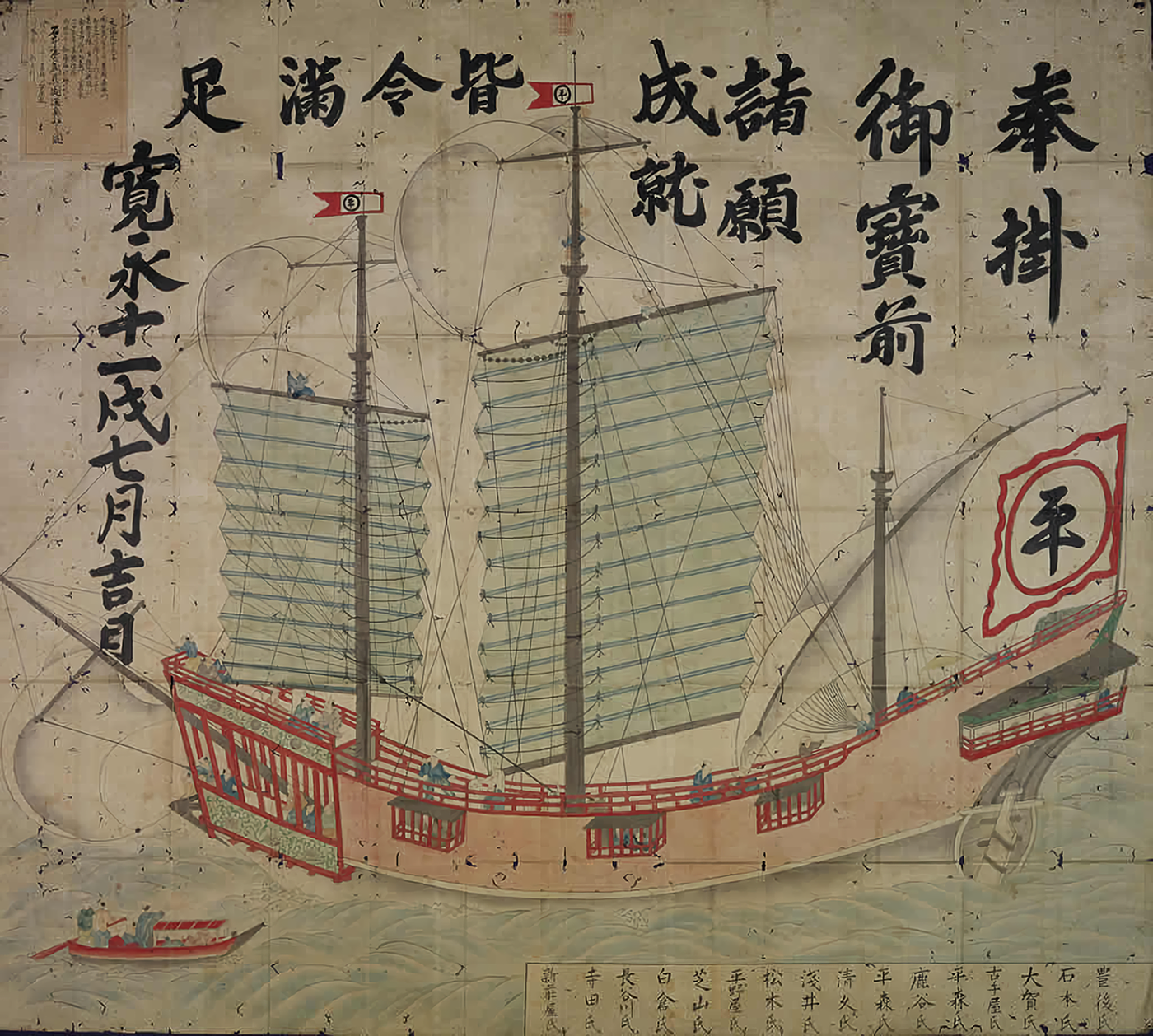
A 1634 Japanese Red Seal ship, incorporating both European-style lateen sails and Chinese-style junk rig sails, rudder and aft designs. The ships were typically armed with 6 to 8 cannons. Tokyo Naval Science Museum.

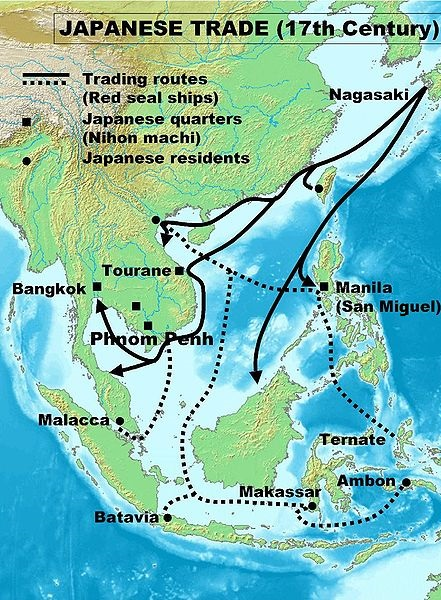
Japanese Red Seal trade in the early 17th century.

Red Seal ships (朱印船, Shuinsen) were Japanese armed merchant sailing ships bound for Southeast Asian ports with red-sealed letters patent issued by the early Tokugawa shogunate in the first half of the 17th century. Between 1600 and 1635, more than 350 Japanese ships went overseas under this permit system.

== Origins ==
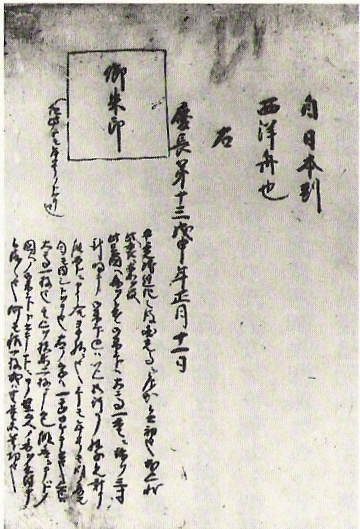
Record of a Red Seal license, dated 11 January 1608.

From the 13th to the 16th century, Japanese ships were quite active in Asian waters, often in the role of "wakō" pirates, that raided the Korean and Chinese coasts. Often paid by various Japanese feudal leaders, they were frequently involved in Japan's civil wars during the early part of this period. Quasi-official trading missions were also sent to China, such as the Tenryūji-bune around 1341. The wakō attacks became less frequent by the third quarter of the sixteenth century. Wakō activity was efficiently curbed in the late 16th century with the interdiction of piracy by Toyotomi Hideyoshi, and the successful campaigns against pirate activity on the Chinese coast by Ming dynasty generals.

Between the 15th and 16th centuries, the main trading intermediary in East Asia was the island kingdom of the Ryūkyū (modern Okinawa), which exchanged Japanese products (silver, swords) and Chinese products for Southeast Asian sappan wood and deer hides. Altogether 150 Ryukyuan ships are recorded between the kingdom and Southeast Asia, 61 of them for Đại Việt (Vietnam), 10 for Malacca, 10 for Patani, 8 for Java, etc. Their commerce disappeared around 1570 with the rise of Chinese merchants and the intervention of Portuguese and Spanish ships and corresponds with the beginnings of the Red Seal system. Japan finally invaded the Ryūkyū Kingdom in 1609.

When the first Europeans started to navigate in the Pacific Ocean (see also Nanban trade), they regularly encountered Japanese ships, such as when the Spanish welcomed in Manila in 1589 a storm-battered Japanese junk bound for Siam, or when the Dutch circumnavigator Olivier van Noort encountered a 110-ton Japanese junk in the Philippines in December 1600, and on the same voyage a Red Seal ship with a Portuguese captain off Borneo through which they learned about the arrival of William Adams in Japan.

== Red Seal system ==
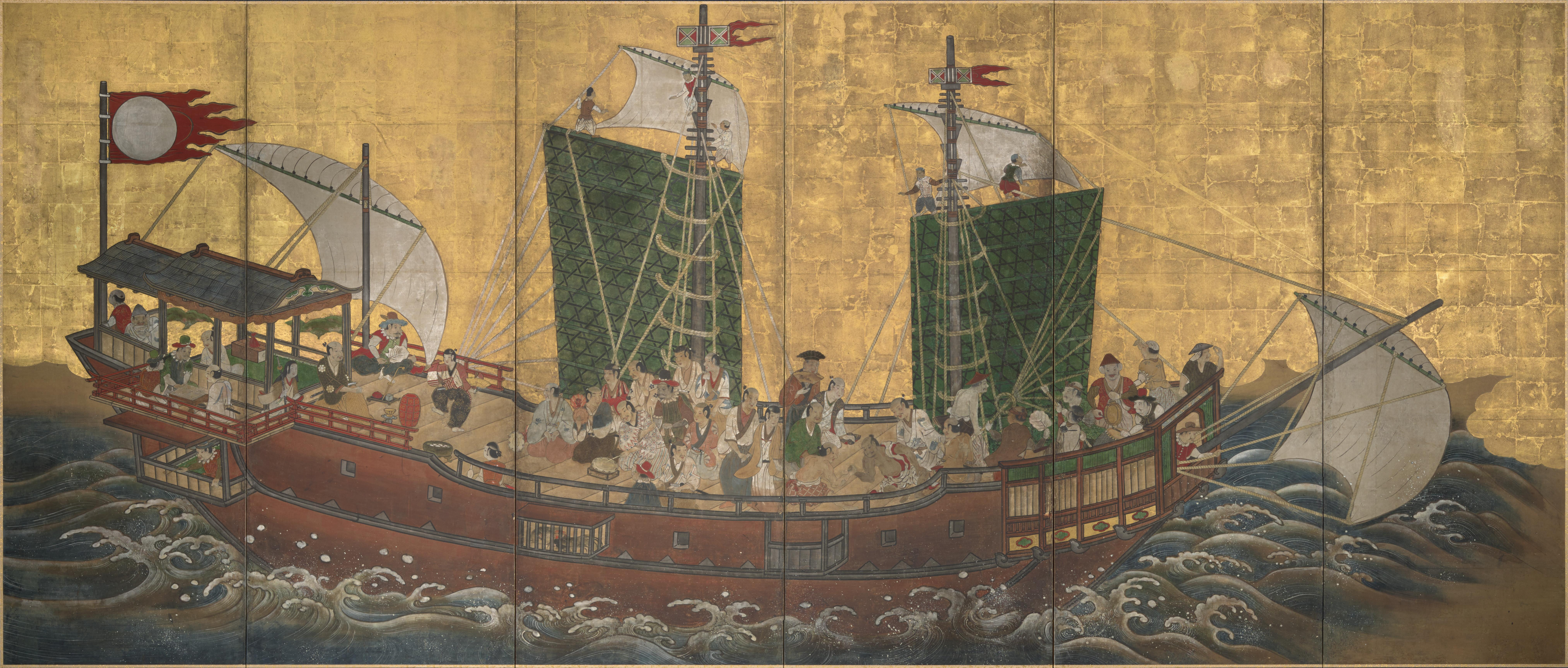
Red Seal ship with Japanese and Portuguese sailors, early 17th century

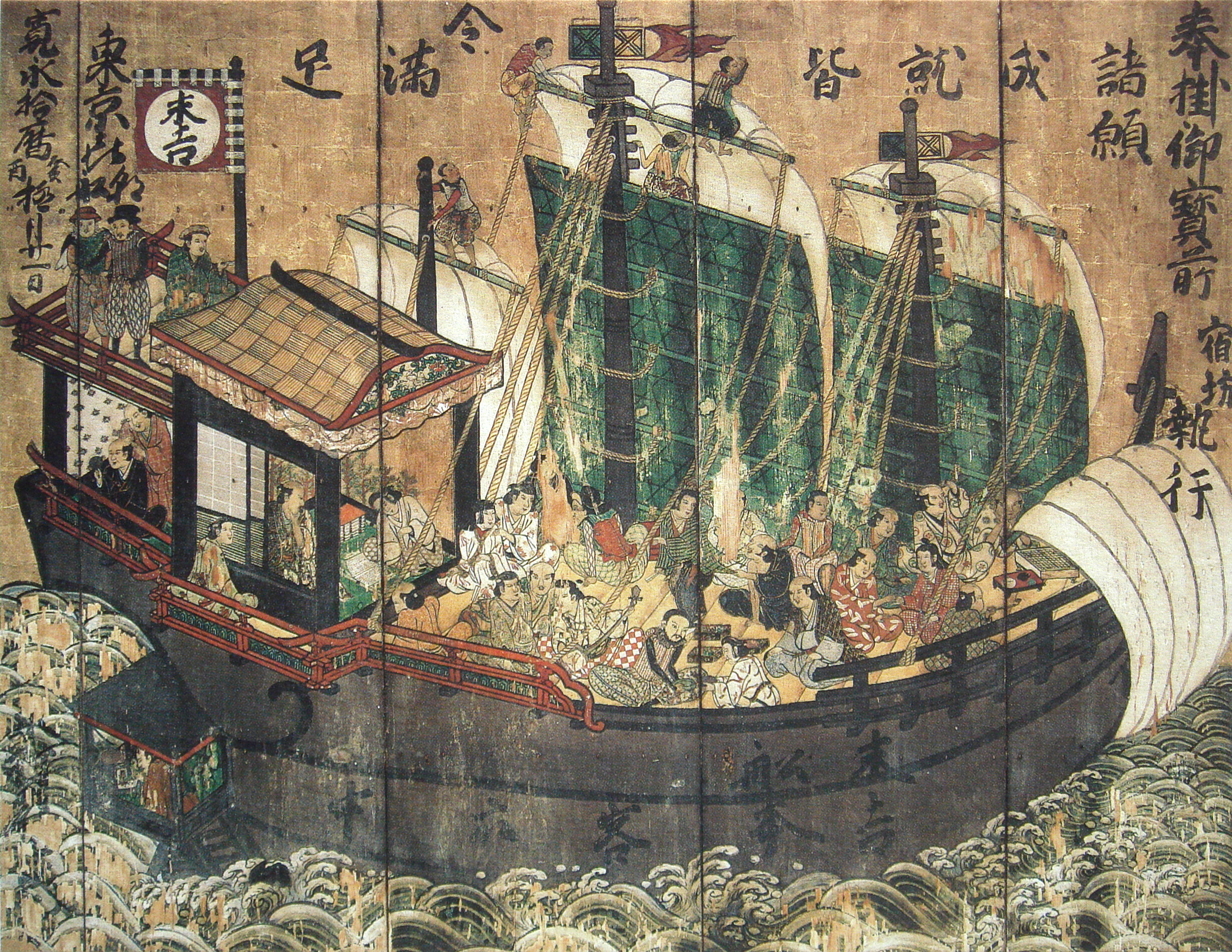
Sueyoshi Red Seal ship in 1633, with foreign pilots and sailors. Kiyomizu-dera Ema (絵馬) painting, Kyoto.

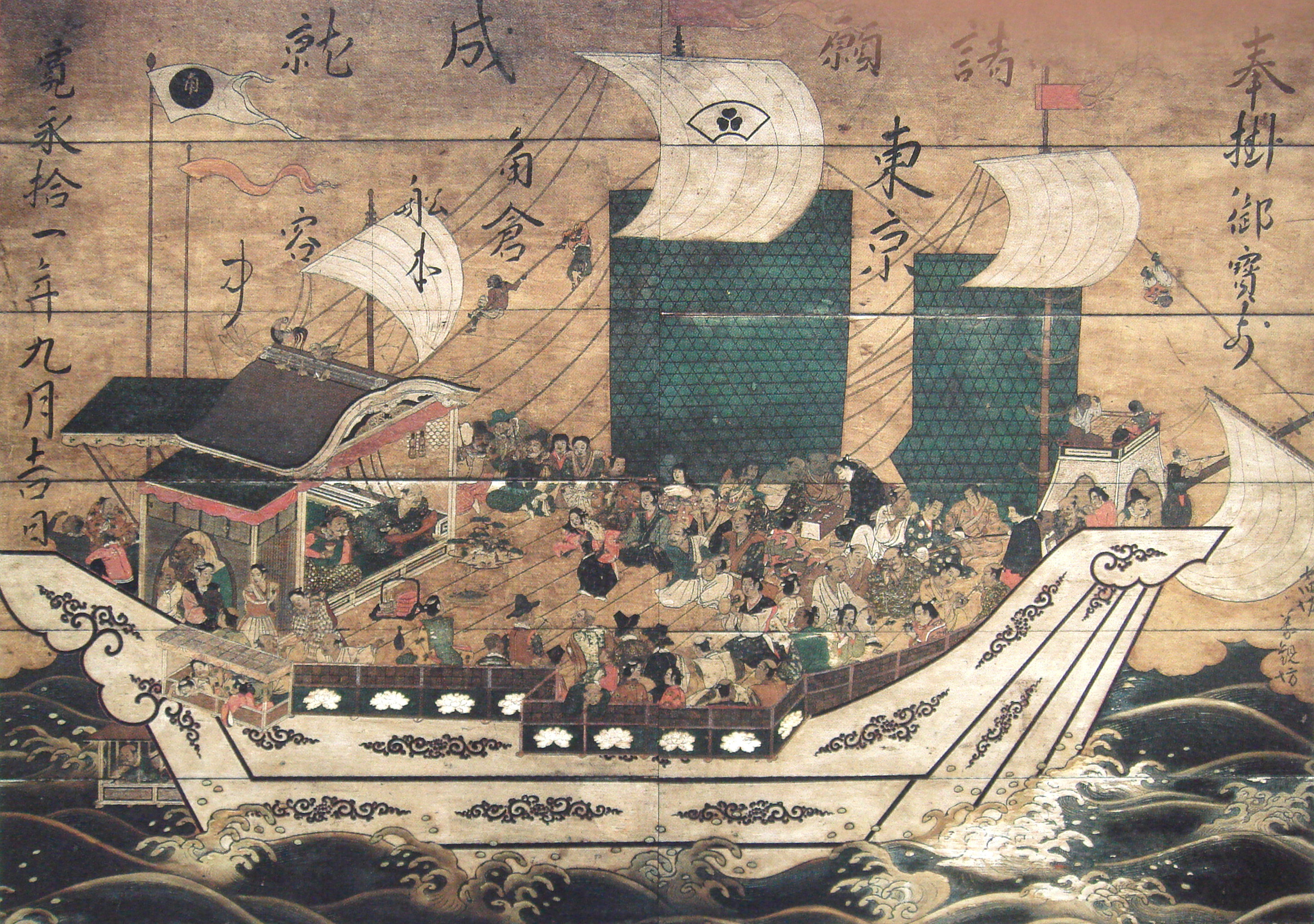
Suminokura Red Seal ship with foreigners. Kiyomizu-dera Ema painting, Kyoto.

The Red Seal system appears from at least 1592, under Toyotomi Hideyoshi, date of the first known mention of the system in a document. The first actually preserved shuinjō (Red Seal permit) is dated to 1604, under Tokugawa Ieyasu, first ruler of Tokugawa Japan. Tokugawa issued red-sealed permits to his favorite feudal lords and principal merchants who were interested in foreign trade. By doing so, he was able to control Japanese traders and reduce Japanese piracy in the South Sea. His seal also guaranteed the protection of the ships, since he vowed to pursue any pirate or nation who would violate it.

Besides Japanese traders, 12 European and 11 Chinese residents, including William Adams and Jan Joosten, are known to have received permits. At one point after 1621, Jan Joosten is recorded to have possessed 10 Red Seal ships for commerce.

Portuguese, Spanish, Dutch, and English ships along with Asian rulers basically protected Japanese Red Seal ships, since they had diplomatic relations with the Japanese shōgun. Only Ming China had nothing to do with this practice, because the Empire officially prohibited Japanese ships from entering Chinese ports. However, Ming officials were not able to stop Chinese smugglers from setting sail to Japan.

== Ship design ==
A 17th-century Red Seal ship of the Araki trading family, sailing out of Nagasaki for Đại Việt (Vietnam)

Red Seal ships usually ranged in size between 500 and 750 tons, a size equal or superior to European galleons, but inferior to that of the massive Portuguese carracks or to Manila galleons, which were often in the vicinity of 1,000 and 2,000 tons, respectively.

The complement is speculated to have been about 200 people per ship; the average of the fifteen Red Seal ships for which the number of people is known is 236.

Red Seal ships varied in style and place of construction. Some, especially those built in Nagasaki, employed Chinese and European techniques to Japanese ship designs. Others were captured Chinese junks. Later, when the Southeast Asian trade was well-established, numerous ships were ordered and purchased in Ayutthaya in Siam, on account of high-quality construction and materials.

The ships were managed by rich trading families such as the Suminokura, Araki, Chaya, and Sueyoshi, or by individual adventurers such as Suetsugu Heizō, Yamada Nagamasa, William Adams, Jan Joosten, or Murayama Tōan. The funds for the purchase of merchandise in Asia were loaned to the managers of the expedition for an interest of 35% to 55% per trip, going as high as 100% in the case of Siam.

== Import and export ==
Japanese merchants mainly exported silver, diamonds, copper, swords, and other artifacts, and imported Chinese silk as well as some Southeast Asian products (like sugar and deer skins). Pepper and other spices were rarely imported into Japan, where people did not eat a great deal of meat due to the local preponderance of adherents to the Buddhist belief system. Southeast Asian ports provided meeting places for Japanese and Chinese ships.

== Destinations ==
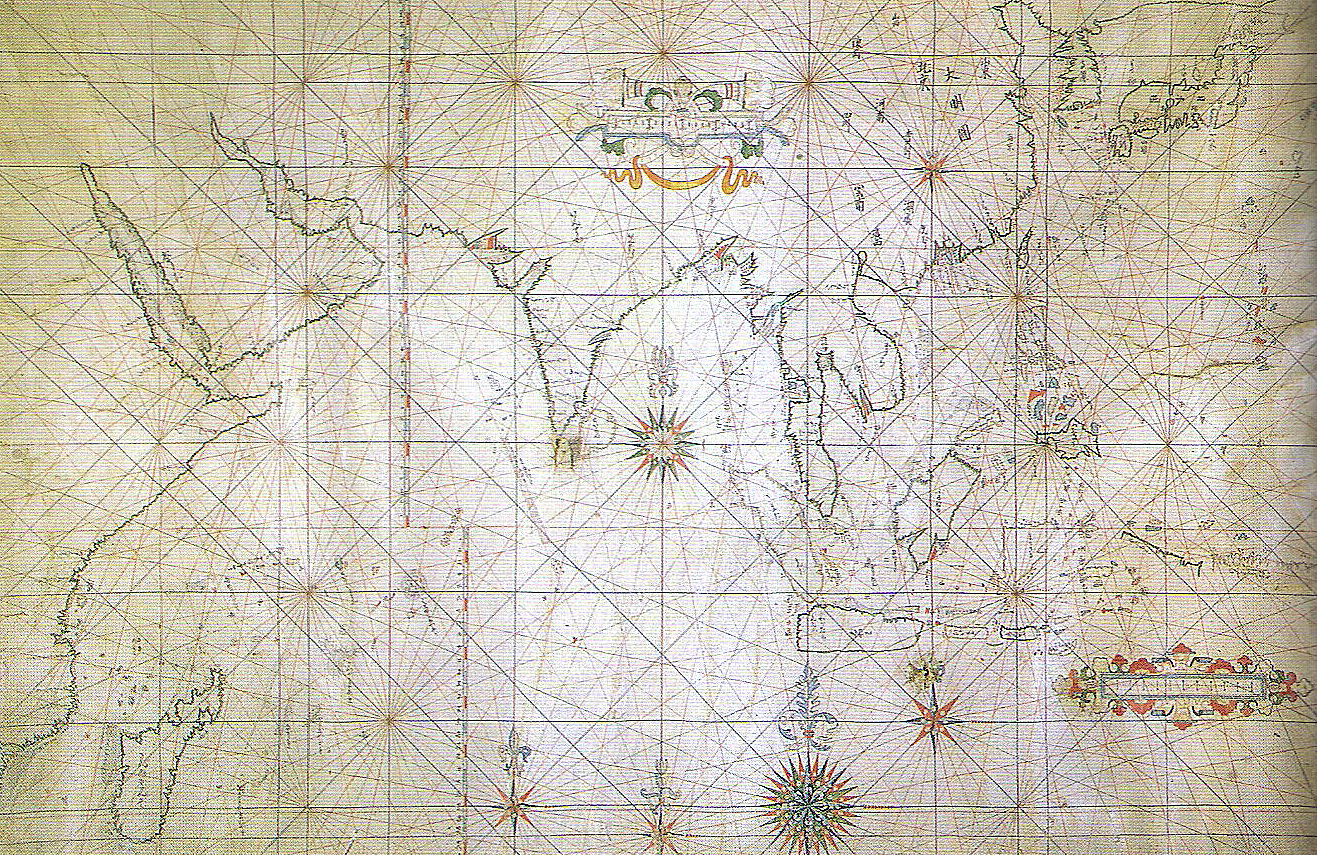
Japanese portolan sailing map, depicting the Indian Ocean and the East Asian coast, early 17th century.

The crew of the Red Seal ships were international, for many Cantonese, Portuguese, and Dutch pilots and interpreters joined the sails. The first Red Seal ships were required to have a Portuguese pilot on board, although the Japanese progressively developed pilots of their own. The Portolan maps used on the Red Seal ships were drawn on the Portuguese model, with directions in the Japanese language.

Major Southeast Asian ports, including Filipino Manila, Vietnamese Hội An, Siamese Ayutthaya, Malay Pattani, welcomed the Japanese merchant ships, and many Japanese settled in these ports, forming small Japanese enclaves.

The Japanese seem to have been feared throughout Asian countries, according to a contemporary, Sir Edward Michelbourne:

The Japons are not suffered to land in any port in India (Asia) with weapons; being accounted a people so desperate and daring, that they are feared in all places where they come.

A Dutch commander wrote (c. 1615): "they are a rough and a fearless people, lambs in their own country, but well-nigh devils outside of it".

=== Philippines ===
Around 50 Red Seal ships to Luzon in the Philippines are recorded between 1604 and 1624 (and only 4 more recorded by 1635). The Japanese had established quite early an enclave at Dilao, a suburb of Manila, where they numbered between 300 and 400 in 1593. In 1603, during the Sangley rebellion, they numbered 1,500 and 3,000 in 1606. The Franciscan friar Luis Sotelo was involved in the support of the Dilao enclave between 1600 and 1608.

The Japanese led an abortive rebellion in Dilao against the Spanish in 1606–1607. Their numbers rose again with the interdiction of Christianity by Tokugawa Ieyasu in 1614, when 300 Japanese Christian refugees under Dom Justo Takayama settled in the Philippines. In the 16th and 17th centuries, thousands of Japanese traders also migrated to the Philippines and assimilated into the local population. They are at the origin of today's 200,000-strong Japanese population in the Philippines.

=== Siam (Thailand) ===
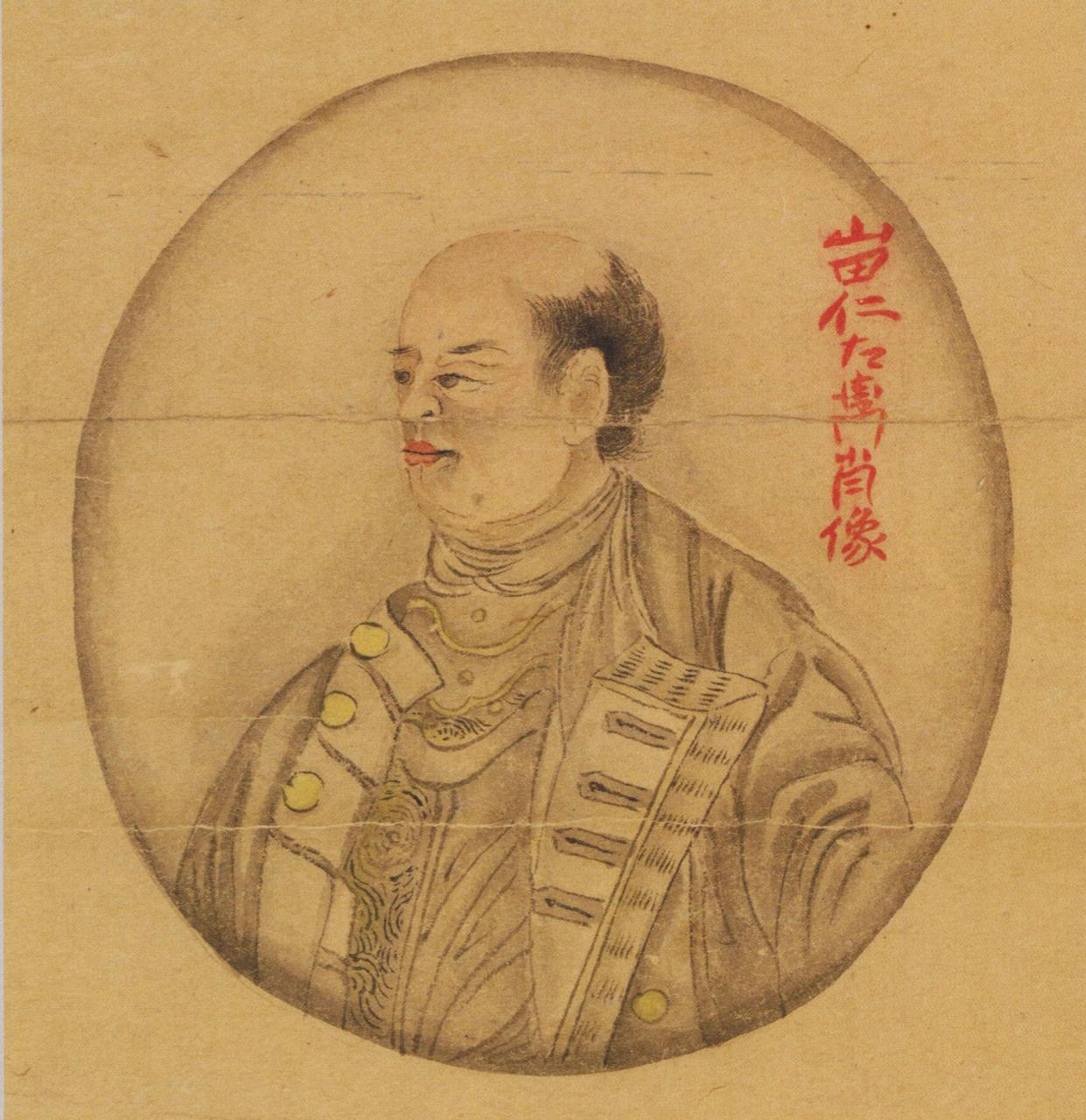
Yamada Nagamasa c.1630.

The Siamese "Chronicles of the Kingdom of Ayutthaya" record that already in 1592, 500 Japanese troops under the King of Siam helped defeat an invading Burmese army.

Around 56 Red Seal ships to Siam are recorded between 1604 and 1635. The Japanese community in Siam seems to have been in the hundreds, as described by the Portuguese Catholic priest, António Francisco Cardim, who recounted having administered sacrament to around 400 Japanese Christians in 1627 in the Thai capital of Ayuthaya ("a 400 japões christãos") (Ishii Yoneo, Multicultural Japan).

In December 1605, John Davis, the famous English explorer, was killed by Japanese pirates off the coast of Siam, thus becoming the first Englishman to be killed by a Japanese.

The colony was active in trade, particularly in the export of deer-hide and sappan wood to Japan in exchange for Japanese silver and Japanese handicrafts (Japanese swords, Japanese lacquerware, high-quality papers). They were noted by the Dutch for challenging the trade monopoly of the Dutch East India Company (VOC), as their strong position with the King of Siam typically allowed them to buy at least 50% of the total production, leaving small quantities of a lesser quality to other traders.

A Japanese adventurer, Yamada Nagamasa, became very influential and ruled part of the Kingdom of Siam (Thailand) during that period. The colony also had an important military role in Thailand.

=== Macau ===
Although prohibited by China from touching Chinese soil, Japanese sailors from Red Seal ships transited through the European Portuguese port of Macau on the Chinese Cantonese coast in some numbers. On 30 November 1608, a fight with about 100 Japanese samurai, wielding katana and muskets, confronting Portuguese soldiers under the acting governor and Captain of the Japan voyage André Pessoa led to a fight in which 50 Japanese lost their lives. The remaining 50 were released by the authorities after having to sign an affidavit blaming themselves for the incident. Ieyasu prohibited visits to Macau by Japanese nationals in 1609:

Since it is an undoubted fact that the going of Japanese in ships to Macau is prejudicial to that place, this practice will be strictly prohibited for the future. (25 July 1609, Ieyasu Shuinjo, remitted to Mateus Leitão)

=== Indonesia ===
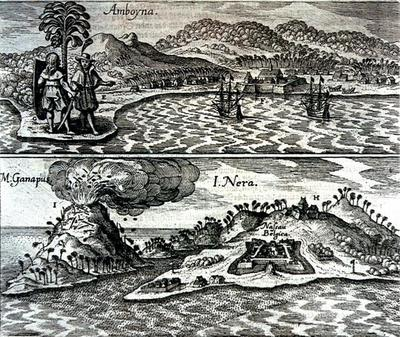
Nine Japanese samurai were employed at Amboyna in 1623, when they were victim of the Amboyna massacre.

Although few Red Seal ships are recorded for the areas of modern Indonesia (Java, Spice Islands), possibly because of the remoteness and because of the direct Dutch involvement there, Japanese samurai were recruited by the Dutch in the area. They distinguished themselves in the capture of the Banda Islands from the English and the defense of Batavia, until the practice of hiring Japanese mercenaries was prohibited by the Shōgun in 1621. In 1618, Jan Pieterszoon Coen, the Dutch governor of Java, requested 25 Japanese samurai to be sent to him from Japan. In 1620, the Dutch record that 90 Japanese samurai were recruited from the islands surrounding Java, in order to reinforce the fort of Batavia.

In 1623, during the Amboyna massacre, 9 Japanese mercenaries were recorded to have been with the 10 English traders of the English East India Company factory. They were tortured and killed by Dutch forces from the neighboring factory. This event was partly the cause for the advent of the Anglo-Dutch Wars.

=== India ===
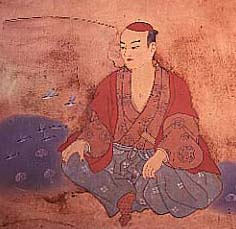
Tenjiku Tokubei, 17th century.

The Japanese adventurer Tenjiku Tokubei is related to have traveled to Siam as well as India on board a Red Seal ship of Jan Joosten. Upon his return to Japan, Tokubei wrote an essay titled Tenjiku Tōkai Monogatari ("Relations of travels to India") on his adventures in foreign countries, which became very popular in Japan. He is sometimes referred to as the Marco Polo of Japan.

=== Other destinations ===
Other major destinations included Đàng Trong in central Vietnam (74 ships), Cambodia (44 ships), Taiwan (35 ships), and other parts of Vietnam (14 ships). Between 1604 and 1639, a total of 130 ships in total traded with Vietnam.

== Relative importance ==
The 350 Red Seal ships recorded between 1604 and 1634, averaging about 10 ships per year, could be compared to the single Portuguese carrack visiting Nagasaki from Macau every year, which was larger in tonnage (between 2 and 3 times a single Red Seal ship), and carried a rich cargo of silk directly obtained from China.

Japanese exports 1604-1639 (From "Red Seal Ships", Nagazumi Yoko)
Type	Number of ships (Average per year)	Export; Value (in kg of Silver)	Of which: Silver export Volume (in kg of Silver)
Red Seal ships	10	1,053,750	843,000
Portuguese ships	1	813,375	650,700
Chinese ships	N/A	429,825	343,860
Dutch ships	3	286,245	228,996
Total		2,583,195	2,066,556

Also in comparison, the English factory in Hirado only received four ships from England in the space of 10 years (during its existence between 1613 and 1623), with generally non-valuable cargo. To survive, the factory actually had to resort to trade between Japan and Southeast Asia under the Red Seal system, organizing seven expeditions, four of which were handled by William Adams.

The Japanese shōgun was very defiant of Spain, and Spain very reluctant to divert shipping resources between distant territories, so that besides the few shipwrecks of the Manila galleon on the Japanese coast, only about one Spanish ship was dispatched to Japan every year for trade. They had a small base in Uraga, where William Adams was put in charge of selling the cargo on several occasions.

Only Chinese shipping seems to have been quite important during the last years of the Ming dynasty. Richard Cocks, head of the English factory in Hirado, reported that 60 to 70 Chinese junks visited Nagasaki in 1614, sailed by Fukienese smugglers.

In 1612, overall, Portuguese priest Valentim de Carvalho, head of the Jesuit mission, stated that the annual "Great Ship" from Macau brought 1,300 quintals of silk, whereas 5,000 quintals were brought in Red Seal ships and ships from China and Manila.

== End of the system ==
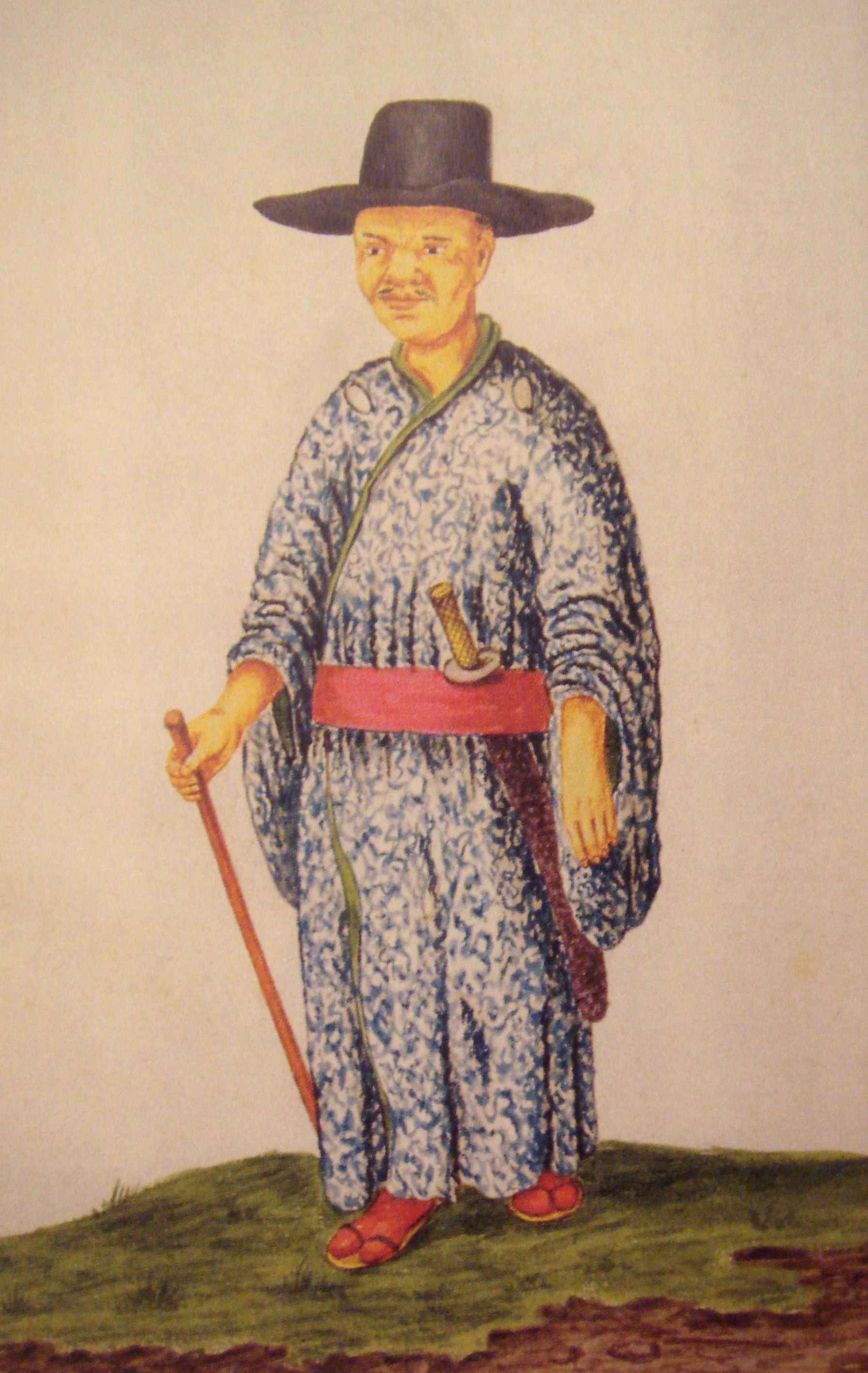
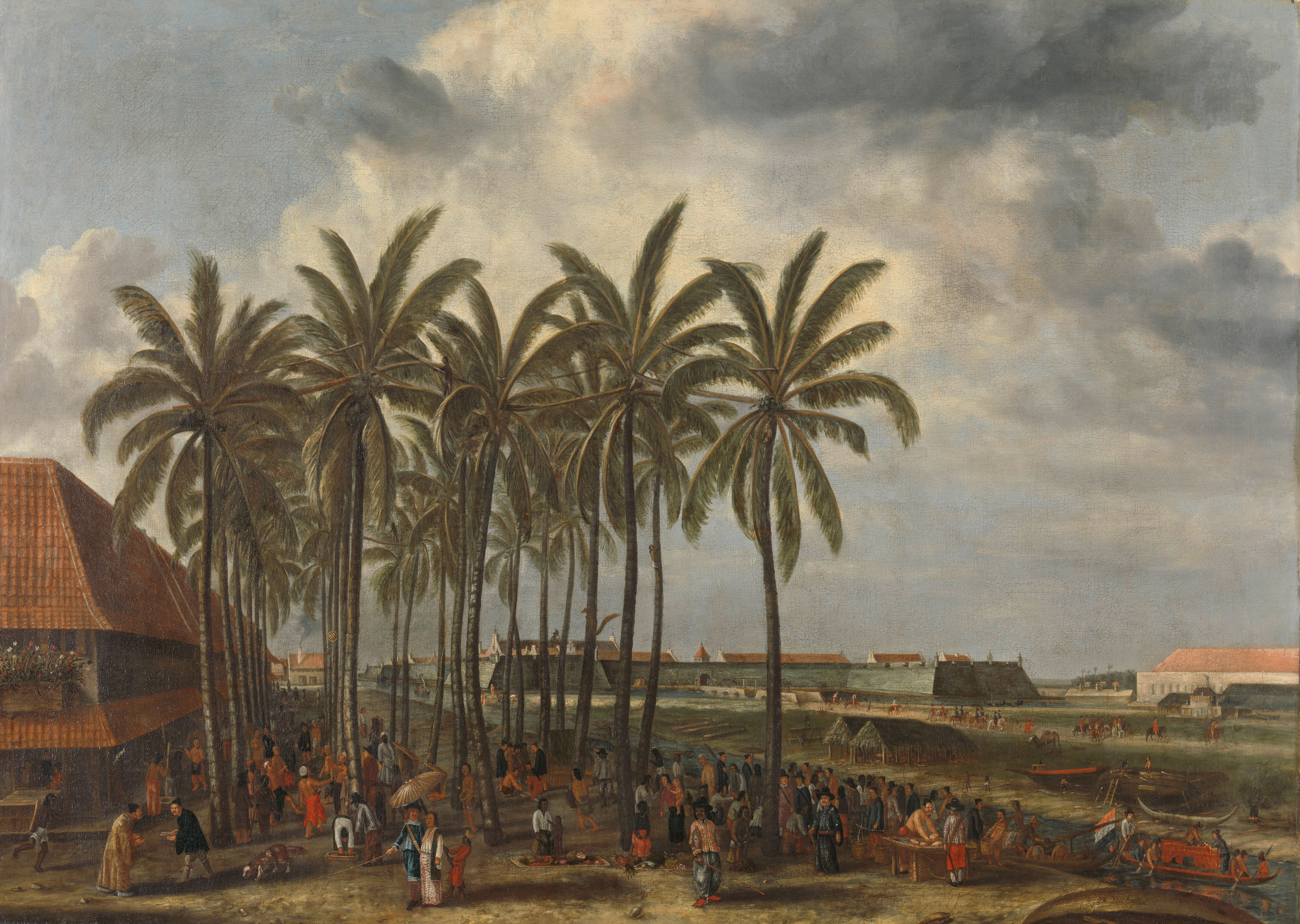
Left image: Japanese Christian remained in Batavia (now renamed as Jakarta) after Sakoku, c. 1656, by Andries Beeckman. Christianity indicated by the hat.
Right image: A similar Japanese figure appears on the right, in the forefront. The Castle of Batavia by Andries Beeckman, c. 1656.

In 1633–1639, Shogun Tokugawa Iemitsu enacted the sakoku policy, which officially prohibited overseas travel by Japanese. This ended Red Seal trade voyages. The Dutch East India Company become the sole officially sanctioned party for European trade with Japan.

== Timeline ==
- 1543 – Portuguese sailors (among them possibly Fernão Mendes Pinto) arrive in Tanegashima and introduce the arquebus.
- 1570 – Japanese pirates occupy parts of Taiwan, from where they prey on China.
- 1571 – Establishment of the port of Nagasaki for trade with the Portuguese, under the supervision of Gaspar Vilela and Tristão Vaz da Veiga.
- 1577 – First Japanese ships travel to Đàng Trong (Southern Vietnam).
- 1588 – Interdiction of wakō piracy by Toyotomi Hideyoshi.
- 1592 – First recorded mention of Red Seal ships.
- 1600 – William Adams reaches Japan in April.

– Olivier van Noort encounters a 110 tons Japanese junk in the Philippines in December.

- 1604 – First known Red Seal permit.

– Battle of Dangpo (1604)

- 1608/9 – Red Seal ship incident
- 1609 – The Dutch open a trading factory in Hirado.
- 1610 – Nossa Senhora da Graça incident
- 1613 – England opens a trading factory in Hirado.

– Hasekura Tsunenaga leaves for his embassy to Europe. He returns in 1620.

- 1614 – Expulsion of the Jesuits from Japan.

– William Adams starts engaging in Red Seal trade to Southeast Asia.

- 1615 – Japanese Jesuits start to proselytize in Indochina.
- 1621 – Jan Joosten manages 10 Red Seal ships.
- 1623 – Yamada Nagamasa sails from Siam to Japan, with an Ambassador of the Siamese king Songtam (พระเจ้าทรงธรรม). He returns to Siam in 1626.

– Jan Joosten sinks in the South China Sea.

- 1624 – Japanese Jesuits start to proselytize in Siam.

– Interruption of relations with Spain.

- 1628 – Death of Yamada Nagamasa in Siam.

– Destruction of Takagi Sakuemon's (高木作右衛門) Red Seal ship in Ayutthaya by a Spanish warship.
– Destruction of the Japanese settlement in Ayutthaya by Siamese forces.

- 1633 – Re-establishment of the Japanese settlement in Ayutthaya (300–400 Japanese), with returnees from Indochina.
- 1634 – Travel of Yamada Yahei (山田弥兵衛) from Japan to Indochina and Siam.
- 1636 – Introduction of the sakoku policy and interdiction of foreign travel or return from foreign countries for Japanese nationals.

== See also ==
- Nanban trade
- Djong (ship)
- Junk (ship)
