= António Francisco Cardim =

Portuguese Jesuit missionary priest

- Born: 1596; Viana do Alentejo, Portugal
- Died: April 30, 1659 (aged 63); Macau
- Occupations: Jesuit priest, missionary and historian

António Francisco Cardim (1596 – April 30, 1659) was a Portuguese Jesuit priest, missionary, and historian who recorded the events of the fathers and brothers of the Jesuit missions in China, Japan, and other places in the Far East.

== Early life and education ==
Cardim was born in 1596 in Viana do Alentejo, the son of Jorge Cardim Frocs and Catherina de Andrade. He entered the University of Évora, where he was admitted into the Society of Jesus on February 24, 1611, at 15 years of age. As a sign of his devotion to Saint Francis Xavier, Cardim added the name "Francisco" to his own last name.

After requesting to be sent to the Far East as a missionary, Cardim sailed to Portuguese India in 1618 in the company of Bishop Diogo Correia Valente (1568-1633). He completed his studies in theology at Goa, where he was ordained as a Jesuit priest on February 1, 1621.

== Career ==
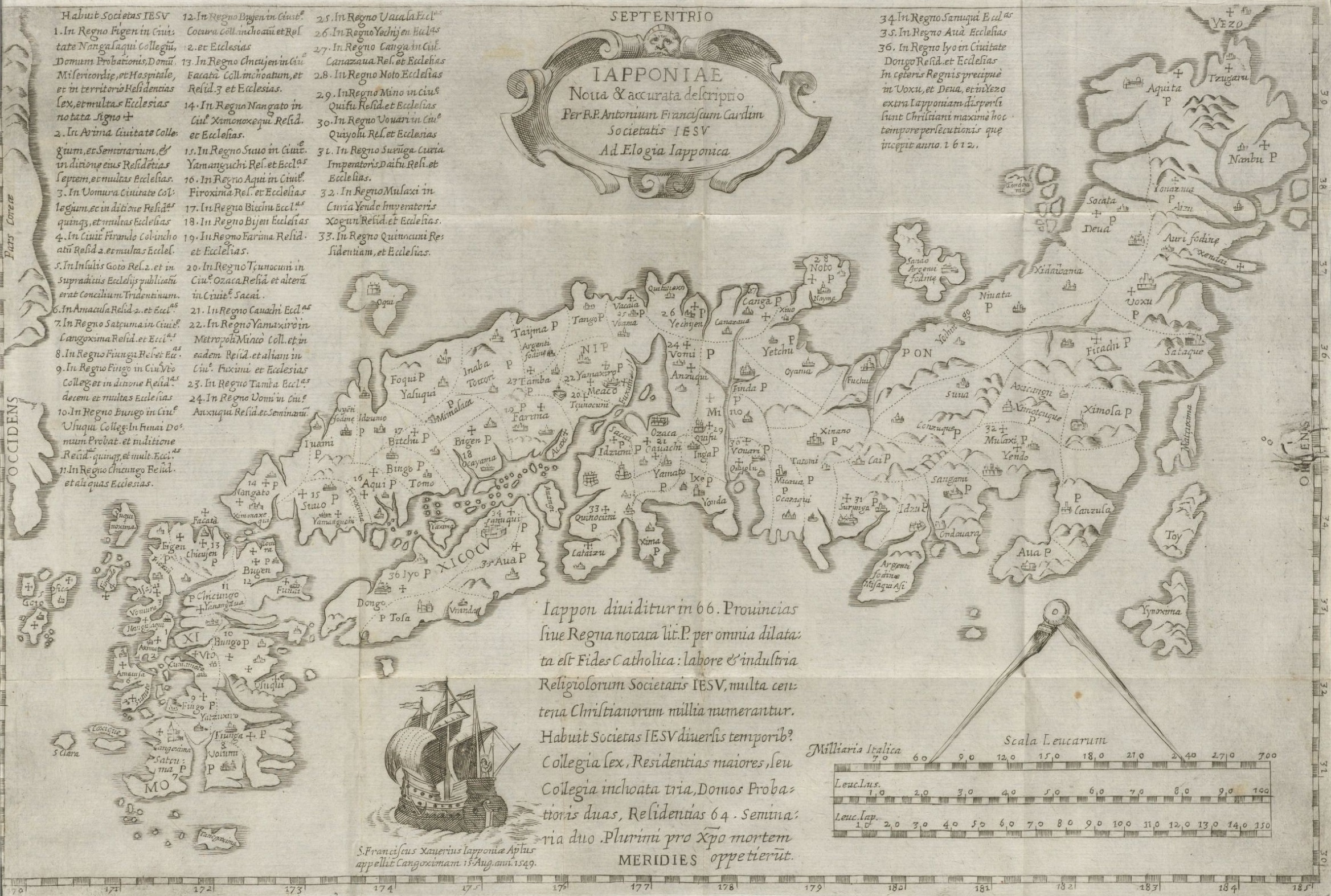
Map of Japan, from Fasciculus e Japponicis floribus by Cardim, first published in 1646. This map is an adaptation of one produced by Bernardino Gínnaro in 1641.

In 1623, after entering the Chinese empire at Guangzhou, Cardim settled in Macau. From 1626 until 1629, he lived in the Ayutthaya Kingdom, where he learned enough of the Thai language to write a catechism and a small treatise on the Christian faith. Together with Pedro Morejón and Romão Nishi, Cardim founded the Jesuit mission in Ayutthaya in 1626. They built a church there, in which they administered the sacraments to hundreds of residents of that city. In 1629, he returned to Macau to inform the local authorities about problems at the mission in Ayutthaya.

In February 1631, Cardim was sent to Tonkin along with Miguel Matsuda and Pedro Kasui (two Japanese missionaries who were later martyred in Japan), where they were received with honor by King Trịnh Tráng. Learning of the existence of the Kingdom of Lan Xang, Cardim wanted to go to explore the possibility of establishing a mission there. However, the King of Ayutthaya would not allow Cardim to enter Lan Xang from Ayutthaya. Cardim later tried to enter through Tonkin, but fell seriously ill and was forced to return to Macau. In Macau, Cardim served as rector of St. Paul's College from August 1632 to May 1636.

Elected prosecutor of the region in 1638, he went to live in Rome. He remained there for several years and participated in the Eighth General Congregation of the Society of Jesus (1645-1646) which elected Vincenzo Carafa as the 7th Superior General of the Society of Jesus. Back in his native Portugal, Cardim received strong support from King John IV for the missions.

Cardim translated some of his works from Latin into Portuguese and Italian, and composed several important monographs on the missions of the Society of Jesus. Notable among these is Fasciculus e Japponicis floribus, which was first published in 1646. The book contains detailed accounts of at least 54 of the Christians martyred in Japan from 1597 through 1640. The book also contains, in addition to eighty-eight engravings, a detailed map of Japan.

In 1640, four Portuguese ambassadors who had gone from Macau to Nagasaki were called upon to renounce their faith, and when they refused they were executed without further trial. Thirteen of their followers were sent back to Macau with this warning: "While the sun warms the earth let no Christian be so bold as to enter into Japan. Let this be known to all men. Though it were the King of Spain in person or the God of the Christians or Shakya himself, whosoever will disobey this prohibition will pay for it with his head." Cardim documented this episode in Mors felicissima quatuor legatorum Lusitanorum quo Japponiae Imperator occidit in odium Christianae religionis, which was first published in 1646.

== Later life and death ==
On April 15, 1649, he boarded São Lourenço, a galleon which was subsequently wrecked off the coast of Portuguese Mozambique, where he passed the following winter. He finally arrived back in Goa at the end of May 1650. He wrote a report on his travels, entitled Batalhas da Companhia de Jesus na sua gloriosa provincia do Japão, which he dedicated to King John IV.

On June 15, 1652, during the crossing from Goa to Macau, his ship was intercepted off Dutch Malacca by Dutch privateers and he was subsequently held prisoner for two years and seven months. After his ransom was paid, he finally arrived at Macau, exhausted by the long and arduous adventure. Cardim died in Macau on April 30, 1659, at 63 years of age.

== Works ==
- Cardim, AF (1645). "Relatione della provincia del Giappone" (in Italian). Rome: Nella Stamperia de Andrea Fei.
- Cardim, AF (1646). "Catalogus regularium, et secularium, qui in Japponiae regnis, in odium Christianae fidei violenta morte sublati sunt" (in Latin). Rome: Typis Heredum Corbelletti.
- Cardim, AF (1646). Mors felicissima quatuor legatorum Lusitanorum quo Japponiae Imperator occidit in odium Christianae religionis (in Latin). Rome: Typis Heredum Corbelletti.
- Cardim, AF (1646). Fasciculus e Japponicis floribus, suo adhuc madentibus sanguine (in Latin). Rome: Typis Heredum Corbelletti. pp. 13–230.
- Cardim, AF (1894). Cordeiro, L (ed.). Batalhas da Companhia de Jesus na sua gloriosa provincia do Japão (in Portuguese). Lisbon: Imprensa Nacional.
