= List of Thai monarchs =

King of Thailand
- พระมหากษัตริย์ไทย
- Royal Standard (since 1910)

Incumbent
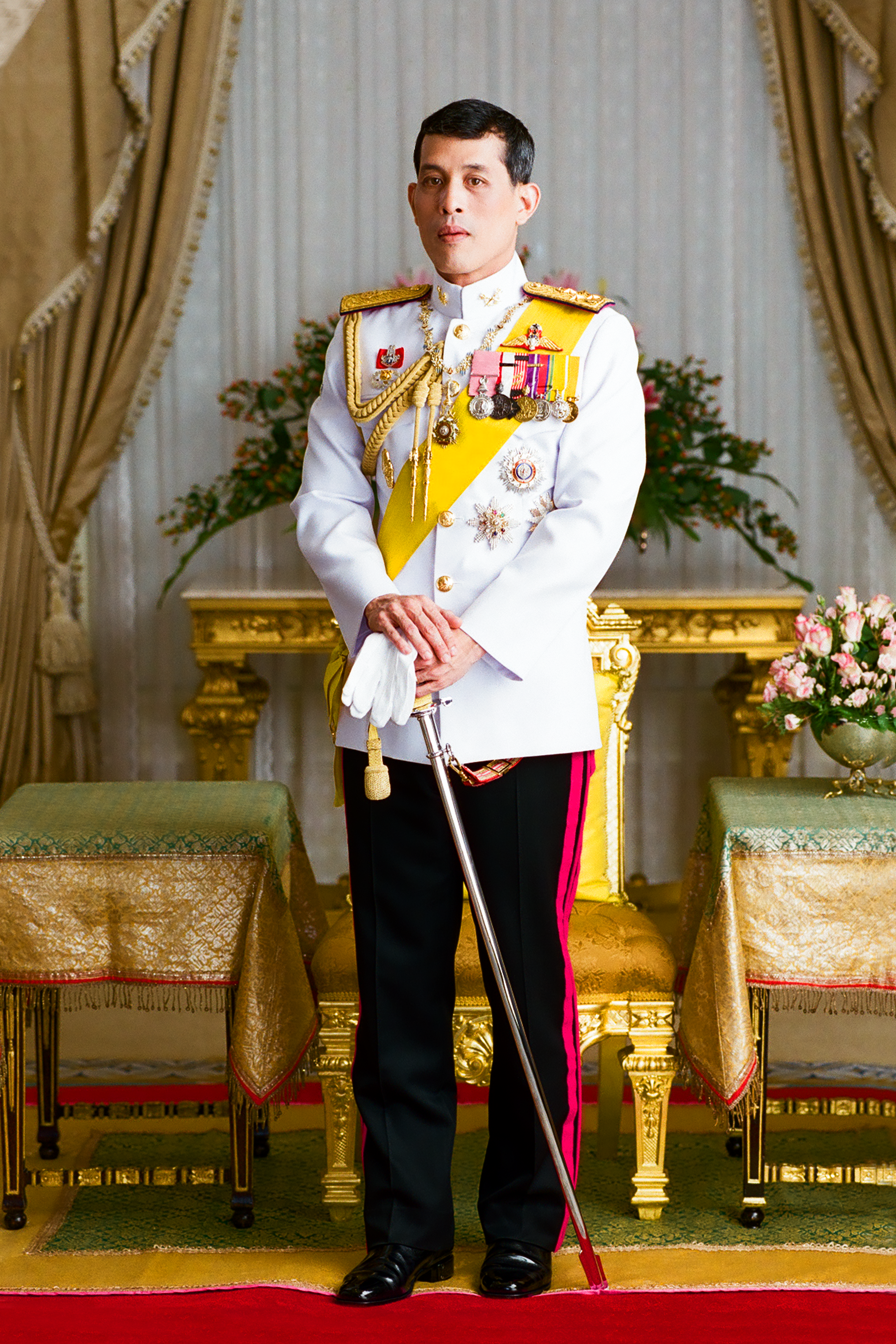
- Vajiralongkorn (Rama X) of the Chakri Dynasty and House Mahidol since 13 October 2016

Details
- Style: His Majesty
- Heir presumptive: Dipangkorn Rasmijoti
- First monarch: Si Inthrathit (contemporary); Phra Pathomsuriya (traditional)
- Formed: 1238; 788 years ago (contemporary); 757; 1269 years ago (traditional)
- Residences: Grand Palace (ceremonial); Dusit Palace (residential)
- Website: royaloffice.th

The modern order of succession of Thai monarchs begins with king Si Inthrathit who established the Sukhothai Kingdom in 1238, which is considered to be the first contemporary Tai-ethnic kingdom; it was ruled by Phra Ruang dynasty. Composing of 8 dynasties: Phra Ruang, Uthong, Suphannaphum, Sukhothai, Prasat Thong, Ban Phlu Luang, Thonburi, and Chakri. With brief interruptions, 55 monarchs and 27 viceroys have ruled over four successive kingdoms, the current monarch being Vajiralongkorn (Rama X) of the Chakri dynasty.

The modern perception is that there has been four distinct eras of Thai history, namely: Sukhothai, Ayutthaya, Thonburi, and Rattanakosin. However, the compilations of historical narratives from the old capital (pongsawadan krung kao) and the historical narratives from the king in the temple compiled by Prince Tisavarakumara, the Prince Damrong Rajanubhab, along with the Chronicles of Northern Kingdom's Histories included the Pre-Sukhothai and Pre-Ayutthaya monarchs as well. This means that the Sukhothai-Si Satchanalai city-states and the Siam Confederation and their monarchs is a part of the historical canon as well.

Prior to the establishment of Sukhothai, Siam was a group of petty kingdoms shifting zones of influences and mandalas through wars and political marriages. Because of this, there are kingdoms and polities which existence may overlap, hence the monarchs' reigns will also overlap or even reign two polities at once. An example are Sukhothai and Ayutthaya. Ayutthaya, in the modern sense, was established during the reign of Maha Thammaracha I of Sukhothai in 1351 in which king Uthong V & Ramathibodi I (same person with two regnal names) inherited all of the confederation's polities – uniting them, hence the reign of Ayutthaya's monarchs overlaps with 4 monarchs of Sukhothai. An example for a monarch reigning multiple polities is when king Phanom Thale Sri who reigned both the Siam Confederation and the Sukhothai-Si Satchanai city-states (together 5 different polities) at the same time in 1155, while these polities were run separately and equal to one another unlike the vassalage system in which a state is subservient to another.

The traditional accounts of the list starts with king Phra Pathomsuriya Thephanarathai Suwannabophit as the first king of all of Siam in 757 CE. He was the first king to unite petty kingdoms under one monarch. His descendants are of the Guruwamsa/Pathomsuriyawong dynasty, which is also the ancestors to most of the reigning dynasty of Sukhothai and Ayutthaya. In which, according to the traditional accounts, king Uthong V, the first king of Ayutthaya is canonically considered to be the 27th monarch of Siam. The number of monarchs up to today would total to 101 monarchs.

== Regarding succession ==
=== Historical precedent ===
Royal succession in Siam historically did not follow a single inflexible rule comparable to later European hereditary primogeniture. During the Ayutthaya period and the early Rattanakosin period, succession could pass to a son of the monarch, an in-law, a brother, another close male relative, or a prince who had previously been elevated to a senior political and military position.

Traditional palace law provided principles concerning eligibility and royal rank, but did not produce an entirely automatic line of succession. Political support among senior princes, ministers, military leaders and court officials could therefore play an important role. The absence of a universally binding order contributed to a number of disputed or violent successions during the Ayutthaya period.

An important institution was the Front Palace (วังหน้า, Wang Na), whose holder functioned as a vice-king or uparaja and was generally regarded as one of the principal potential successors to the reigning monarch. The holder could be a son, brother or other senior relative of the king, and possession of the office did not itself guarantee eventual succession.

=== Modern precedent ===
Modern applications of Thai succession law demonstrate the interaction between the Palace Law on Succession of 1924 and the constitutional procedures introduced after the end of absolute monarchy in 1932. Although the legal framework has changed over time, several twentieth- and twenty-first-century accessions provide precedents for how succession has operated in practice. The precedent is hereditary monarchy with royal designation superimposed on a male-preference dynastic default, plus a constitutional mechanism for female succession

=== Under the conditions of an appointed heir ===
No.	Event
-	An heir is appointed
1	The throne becomes vacant
2	The cabinet notifies the Parliament
3	The Parliament acknowledge the heir
4	The Parliament invites the heir to ascend the throne
5	The heir is crowned

==== Accession of Rama VIII, 1935 ====
King Prajadhipok had not appointed an Heir to the Throne and, in his instrument of abdication of 2 March 1935, expressly relinquished his prerogative to designate a successor under Section 5 of the Palace Law on Succession of 1924. The succession therefore had to be determined according to the statutory order of succession, together with the requirement under Section 9 of the 1932 Constitution that the choice receive the approval of the House of Representatives.

The Council of Ministers examined the surviving male branches of the Chakri dynasty. Two sons of Rama VII's full brothers, Prince Chula Chakrabongse and Prince Varananda Dhavaj, were passed over: Chula because the government interpreted the succession law as excluding him on account of his foreign-born mother, and Varananda because of the status of his mother and his father's marriage. Prince Paribatra Sukhumbandhu, Rama VII's surviving elder half-brother, and his sons were likewise not considered by the Cabinet, as Prince Paribatra had been living in exile following the 1932 revolution.

The remaining principal branches considered were those descended from Prince Mahidol Adulyadej, Prince of Songkla, and Prince Yugala Dighambara, Prince of Lopburi. The government preferred the Mahidol branch, in part because Prince Mahidol's mother, Queen Savang Vadhana, held a higher royal rank than Prince Yugala's mother. Within the Mahidol branch, Prince Ananda Mahidol was senior to his younger brother, Prince Bhumibol Adulyadej. The Council of Ministers therefore resolved to propose Prince Ananda Mahidol as successor.

On 7 March 1935, the House of Representatives formally approved Prince Ananda Mahidol's accession. The Council of Ministers subsequently invited him by telegram to ascend the throne, with his reign deemed to have commenced retroactively from the moment Rama VII's abdication became effective on 2 March 1935. The official proclamation expressly described Ananda Mahidol as the first royal person in the order of succession under Section 9 of the Palace Law.

The accession of Rama VIII therefore provides an important modern example of succession in the absence of an appointed heir. Unlike the accession of Rama X in 2016, in which the legislature merely acknowledged an appointment already made by the preceding King, the 1935 succession required the government to determine the applicable dynastic order under the Palace Law and obtain the approval of the House of Representatives before inviting the successor to ascend the throne.

=== Under the conditions of no appointed heir ===
No.	Event
-	No heir is appointed
1	The throne becomes vacant
2	The Privy Council, following the Palace law and the Constitution proposes successor
3	The cabinet notifies the Parliament
4	The Parliament acknowledge the appointee or rejects the selected appointee
-	The throne is vacant while the parliament is debating on the appointee The cabinet is now in effect Regent pro tempore
5	The Parliament invites the heir to ascend the throne, if acknowledged
6	The heir is crowned

==== Accession of Rama X, 2016 ====
King Bhumibol had formally appointed his son Prince Vajiralongkorn Crown Prince and heir to the throne on 28 December 1972.

Consequently, when King Bhumibol died on 13 October 2016, the designated-heir procedure applied rather than the procedure for selecting a successor in the absence of an heir.

The National Legislative Assembly, then acting as the National Assembly, formally acknowledged the existing appointment on 29 November 2016. Its president subsequently invited Crown Prince Vajiralongkorn to ascend the throne, and he accepted the invitation on 1 December 2016. His reign was declared to have commenced from 13 October 2016.

The accession is the most recent practical example of the distinction between parliamentary acknowledgement of an already appointed heir and parliamentary approval of a successor where no heir has been appointed.

== Titles and naming conventions ==
=== Sukhothai Kingdom ===
All of the mentioned titles are now defunct due to the abolition of the peerage

Khun — ขุน — Originally meaning “lord” or “chieftain,” Khun was a title used for local rulers or leaders of settlements. In later periods, is given to bureaucratic positions within government mostly to ministers, though a number of Shan states still retain this title for their rulers and kings. Originally a Tai word.

- Khun Ban Muang - King of Sukhothai
- Hkun Hseng Awng Tun - King of Hsenwi
- Khun Khreua - King of Lanna

Phaya — พญา (sometimes written พระยา in later periods) — Originally meaning “lord.” In later periods, this title is given to people governing second-tier or lower-class cities. This title is now an equivalent to the title Marquess. Originally a Pali-Sanskrit word. This title was also used in numerous other Tai-ethnic kingdoms in the regions. The title is also adapted to a couple of higher titles such as Chao Phaya and Somdet Chao Phaya. Which is equivalent to Duke and Grand Duke in that order, though these title holders often do not hold fief / territory. Though when they do hold hand, it is tantamount to half the nation, such as the position of the prime minister of northern Siam, comes with the position of grand duke. The title is defunct. This title is also bestowed upon vassal kings and monarchs.

- Phaya Loe Thai - King of Sukhothai
- Phaya Mangrai - King of Lanna
- Phraya Kakawannathiparatcha Wachiraprakarn - Princely monarch of Chiang Mai
- Phaya Khun Fong - monarch of Nan (a mixture of the title Phaya and Khun)

Pho Khun — พ่อขุน — Originally meaning “lord father", is a term used for related or deceased rulers. The title is now defunct. Originally a Tai word.

- Pho Khun Ram Khamhaeng - King of Sukhothai

Pu Khun — ปู่ขุน — Originally meaning “lord grandfather.” It is a term to use for deceased rulers. The title is now defunct. Originally a Tai word.

Pu Phaya — ปู่พญา — Originally meaning “lord grandfather.” It is a term to use for deceased rulers. The title is now defunct. Originally a Tai + Pali-Sanskrit word.

Phrabat Kamrateng An Sri — พระบาทกัมรเตงอัญศรี — The monarch also adopted the Khmer prestige title Kamrateng An (Thai: กมฺรเตงฺ อญฺ), meaning "our lord", as regnal title. The title is now defunct. Originally a Khmer word.

- Kamrateng An Sri Inthrabodinthrathit - King of Sukhothai

=== Ayutthaya and later kingdoms ===
All of the mentioned titles are now defunct due to the abolishment of the peerage, except the title of Phra Chao and onwards

Muen — หมื่น — Originally meaning "officer/baron." It is a title typically bestowed upon vassal king or a regional monarch and is not normally used on the kings of the Chao Phraya basin. The title is now defunct. In the chao phraya basin, it is bestowed upon officers within the central government.

- Muen Soi Chiang Khong - Princely monarch of Nan

Thao — ท้าว — Originally meaning "lord/lady/sir/dame." It is a title typically bestowed upon a vassal king or a regional monarch and is not normally used on the kings of the Chao Phraya basin. The title is now defunct. In the chao phraya basin, it is bestowed upon officers within the central government and/or people who have achieved a great feat, akin to a knight or dame.

- Thao Kha Kan - King of Nan
- Thao Suranari - Dame Duchess of Nakhon Rachasima
- Thao Chai - King of Lanna

Khun Luang — ขุนหลวง — Originally meaning “royal chief.” It is used for informal reference of the king. The title is now defunct.

Phra — พระ — Originally meaning “royal or holy.” The title is now defunct. It was also used in the Sukhothai era.

- Phra Chetthathirat - King of Ayutthaya

Chao Luang — เจ้าหลวง — Originally meaning “royal lord.” It is a title typically bestowed upon vassal king or a regional monarch and is not normally used on the kings of the Chao Phraya basin. The title is now defunct.

- Chao Luang Chaiyawongse - Princely monarch of Lampang

Chao Fa — เจ้าฟ้า — Originally meaning “celestial prince / celestial lord." usually used for viceroys and princes. It was used to refer to a number of Shan states still retain this title for their rulers and kings. The title is now defunct.

- Chao Fa Krom Khun Intharaphitak - Viceroy of Thonburi
- Hso Lung Hpa - King of Mohnyin (Chao Fa is usually separated in Shan titles)
- Sukaphaa - King of Ahom
- Chao Fa Nhor Muang - King of Nan

Krom Phrarachawang Baworn — กรมพระราชวังบวร — Originally meaning “Royal Front Palace Lord." The title is now defunct.

- Krom Phrarachawang Baworn Wichaichan - Viceroy of Rattanakosin

Somdet Phra Baworn Rat Chao — สมเด็จพระบวรราชเจ้า — Originally meaning “Royal Highness the Exalted Vice-King." The title is now defunct.

- Somdet Phra Baworn Rat Chao Maha Senanurak - Viceroy of Rattanakosin

Phra Chao — พระเจ้า — Originally meaning “buddha" but later due to western influences, the term became synonymous with the abrahamic "god" or just any god. It is used for informal reference of the king. Though it is informal to refer to the chao phraya kingdom's king, it is nonetheless the formal way to refer to the northern and other regional monarchs.

- Phra Chao Uthong II - King of the Siamese Confederation
- Phra Chao Taksin - King of Thonburi
- Phra Chao Kawilalolot Suriyawongse - King of Chiang Mai
- Phra Chao Tilokkarat - King of Lanna

Chao — เจ้า — Originally meaning “lord/prince/master." It is commonly used for loyalty and noblemen. The title is used to refer to a number of Shan states still retain this title for their rulers and kings.

- Chao Sam Phaya - King of Ayutthaya
- Sao Kawng Kiao Intaleng - King of Kengtung (Chiang Tung)
- Chao Kaew Nawarat - Princely monarch of Chiang Mai

Phrabat Somdet — พระบาทสมเด็จ — Originally meaning "Most Exalted Majesty."

Somdet Phra — สมเด็จพระ — Originally meaning "Exalted Majesty."

Phrabat Somdet Phra — พระบาทสมเด็จพระ — Originally meaning "Most Exalted Royal Majesty."

Phrabat Somdet Phra Chao — พระบาทสมเด็จพระเจ้า — Originally meaning "Most Exalted Majesty the Lord."

Phrabat Somdet Phra Poramenthara ... Chao Yu Hua — พระบาทสมเด็จพระปรเมนทร...เจ้าอยู่หัว — Originally meaning “His Most Exalted Majesty the Supreme Sovereign, the Lord Above Our Heads.” (used for Rama 1,3,5,...; odd number)

Phrabat Somdet Phra Poraminthara ... Chao Yu Hua — พระบาทสมเด็จพระปรมินทร...เจ้าอยู่หัว — Originally meaning “His Most Exalted Majesty the Supreme Sovereign, the Lord Above Our Heads.” (used for Rama 2,4,6,...; even number)

- Klao Chao Yu Hua — เกล้าเจ้าอยู่หัว is not necessarily an assumed title for all the monarchs, both Rama I, Rama II, Rama VIII, and Rama IX do not have this suffix in their titles. This is the king's regnal name.

Maha ... Paramarachathirat — ปรมราชาธิราช — Originally meaning "The most supreme sovereign" This is often used when abbreviating names of kings. This is also the equivalent of the western title Rex or Regina as in Charles III Dei Gratia Rex.

In the Sukhothai Kingdom, the monarch used the title Khun (Thai: ขุน) or Phaya (Thai: พญา), while Pho Khun/ Phaya (Thai: พ่อขุน/ พ่อพญา) or Phoo Khun/ Phaya (Thai: ปู่ขุน/ ปู่พญา) were used to refer to deceased monarchs or senior relatives who were monarchs. The monarch also adopted the Khmer prestige title Kamrateng An (Thai: กมฺรเตงฺ อญฺ), meaning "our lord", as regnal title.

In the Ayutthaya Kingdom and afterward, thanandon, the system of Thai royal titles, determines the style of the monarch's full regnal name (which includes the title), consisting of two interconnected parts:

- The first part is the title Phra Bat Somdet Phra Chao Yu Hua (Thai: พระบาทสมเด็จพระเจ้าอยู่หัว, 'His Majesty the King'). The title is split by the regnal name, written between Phra and Chao. If the monarch was not formally crowned, Phra Bat is omitted. If the monarch ruled as a tributary or was usurped, Somdet may be omitted.
  - Sometimes, Chao Yu Hua is fully omitted. Other times, only Yu Hua is omitted, in which case Chao follows the remaining components of the title and precedes the regnal name.
- The second part is the regnal name, of which only a portion may be used to commonly refer to the monarch. It may differ from their birth name, their name as uparaja (viceroy), or their posthumous name and/or historical style. This list refers to monarchs by the names most often used by traditional historians.

Western nations referred to the monarch as the "King of Siam" (Latin: Rex Siamensium), regardless of Thai titles, since the initiation of relations in the 16th century. Mongkut (Rama IV) was the first monarch to adopt the title when the name Siam was first used in an international treaty. When the kingdom's name was changed to Thailand, the monarch's Western title changed accordingly.

== Regarding relations between dynasties and houses ==
Due to intermarriages between Siamese polities, dynasties are usually branches or cadet branches of an already existing house. A dynasty may also arise from a minor member of a house through the right of conquest.

=== Regarding dynasties and houses ===
In the Siamese context, a dynasty includes all monarchs and their kinsmen who have ascended to the throne. This means that a dynasty encompasses individuals of the same bloodline, including brothers, uncles, and other relatives.

The concept of houses, by contrast, is a more recent construct used to describe subdivisions within a dynasty. A king is considered to belong to the house of his father, regardless of whether the father was a reigning monarch, as long as he was a son of a king or a vice-king.

Within a dynasty, houses function as sub-units. Multiple houses can exist within the same dynasty, each representing a distinct patrilineal branch. A king inherits his house from his father, regardless of whether the father was a reigning monarch; what matters is that the father was a son of a king or a vice-king. As a result, a dynasty may contain numerous houses—for example, the Chakri Dynasty includes over a hundred cadet houses, divided into royal and viceroyal branches.

Houses are passed from father to son. When brothers ascend the throne in succession, they belong to the same house if they do not have a son who later becomes king.

For example, Rama I, Rama II, and Rama III are considered part of the same house. Rama IV, however, is considered to be a part of a new house, as he was a brother of Rama III rather than his son. Rama V, Rama VI, and Rama VII belonged to Rama IV's house; since neither Rama VI nor Rama VII had sons who became king, the house continued unchanged.

The throne later passed through Prince Mahidol, establishing another new house. His sons, Rama VIII and Rama IX, belonged to this same house, with Rama IX succeeding his brother.

==== Example: Lineage of the Chakri Dynasts and its component houses ====
- · House Ramathibodi ·
  - Rama I
    - Houses | Indrāngura Dabbakula Suriyakul Chatrakul Phungbun Tārākara Duangchakra Sudasna
  - Rama II son of Rama I
    - Houses | Mālakul Abharanakul Klauaymai Kusuma Tejātivongse Phanomvan Kunjara Renunandana Niyamisara Dinakara Baidurya Mahākul Vajrivansa Xumsaeng Sanidvongs Morakot Nilaratna Arunvongse Kapitthā Pramoja
    - · House Mongkut ·
      - Rama IV son of Rama II
        - House | Chakrabandhu Bhānubandhu Chitrabongs Navavongsa Supratishtha Kritākara Gaganānga Sukhasvasti Dvivongs Thongyai Kshemasanta Kamalāsana Kshemasrī Sridhavaja Thongthaem Jumbala Devakula Svastikula Chandradatta Jayānkura Varavarna Tisakula Sobhanga Sonakul Vadhanavongs Svastivatana Jayanta
      - Rama V son of Rama IV
        - House | Kitiyākara Rabībadhana Pavitra Chirapravati Ābhākara Paribatra Chhatr-jaya Beñ-badhana Chakrabongs Yugala Vudhijaya Suriyong Rangsit Chudādhuj Varanand
          - · House Mahidol ·
            - · Prince Mahidol Adulyadej · son of Rama V
              - Rama VIII son of Prince Mahidol Adulyadej
              - Rama IX son of Prince Mahidol Adulyadej
              - Rama X son of Rama IX
                - House | Vivacharawongse
      - Rama VI son of Rama V
      - Rama VII son of Rama V
  - Rama III son of Rama II
    - Houses | Sirivongse Komen Ganechara Ngon-rath Latāvalya Xumsai Piyakara Uraibongse Arnob Lamyong Suparna Sinharā Jambūnud

=== Relations between dynasties ===
- Pathomsuriyawong Dynasty (700–1351) - the line of Phra Pathomsuriya Thephanarathai Suwannabophit (b.742; d.800) Came to power using the right of inheritance.
  - Phra Ruang Dynasty (1238–1438; 1468–1474) - the line of Inthrabodinthrathit (b.1188; d.1270) from Suriwawong, the elder son of Sri Singha of Pathomsuriyawong. Inthrabodinthrathit overthrew Thao Saen Pom king of Suphannaphum who was reigning Sukhothai-Si Satchanalai at the time thus establishing the Sukhothai Kingdom. Came to power using the right of conquest.
    - Later Suphannaphum Dynasty (1409–1569) - the line of Nakhon Intharachathirat (b.1359; d.1424) mother from Loe Thai of Phra Ruang Dynasty, he is the son of Borommarachathirat I. Nakhon Intharachathirat, king of the constituent kingdom of Suphannaphum overthrew king Ramrachathirat. Came to power using the right of conquest.
    - Sukhothai Dynasty (1569–1629) - the line of Sanphet I (b.1509; d.1590) known relation to Phra Ruang Dynasty but unknown exact relation. Sanphet I, Marquess of Phitsanulok was installed by the Burmese emperor Bayinnaung as a vassal king. Came to power using the right of vassalage.
      - Prasat Thong Dynasty (1629–1688) - the line of Sanphet V (b.1599; d.1655) as son of Sanphet III or maternal-cousin of Borommaracha I, both of Sukhothai Dynasty. Sanphet V, Defence Minister and Marquess Prime Minister of Ayutthaya overthrew king Athittayawong. Came to power using the right of conquest.
        - Ban Phlu Luang Dynasty (1688–1767) - the line of Sanphet VIII (b.1661; d.1709) from Ramathibodi III (b.1632; d.1688) son of Sanphet V of Prasat Thong Dynasty. King Phetracha, Elephant Corps Minister and General of the Ayutthaya Army overthrew king Ramathibodi III. He later passed on the throne to his adoptive son Sanphet VIII. Came to power using the right of conquest.
      - Chakri Dynasty (1782–present) - the line of Rama I (b.1737; d.1809) from Duke Kosa Pan (b.1633; d.1699) grandson of Sanphet III (b.1557; d.1610) of Sukhothai Dynasty. Rama I, former Count of Ratburi, Grand Duke Prime Minister of Thonburi overthrew king Sanphet X. Came to power using the right of conquest.
- Aphaikhamini Dynasty (957–c.1100s) - the line of Phraya Aphaikhamini (died 959) Came to power using the right of election.''
  - Uthong Dynasty (1351–1370) - the line of Uthong V & Ramathibodi I (b.1314; d.1369) mother is from Anuracha (b.1112; d.1167) younger son of Sri Singha of Pathomsuriyawong. Uthong V & Ramathibodi I had inherited all of the Dvaravati polities by 1351. His title is Uthong V of Suphannaphum and Phripphri and Ramathibodi I of Ayothaya and Lavo. Came to power using the right of inhertiance.
- Thonburi Dynasty (1767–1782) - the line of Sanphet X (b.1734; d.1782). Marquess of Tak reunited the kingdom after the disintegration of the kingdom of Ayutthaya into 5 different kingdoms. Came to power using the right of conquest.
- Former Suphannaphum Dynasty (1370–1388) - the line of Borommarachathirat I (b.1310; d.1388) father is Uthong III of Suphannaphum. Borommarachathirat I, king of the constituent kingdom of Suphannaphum overthrew king Ramesuan. Came to power using the right of conquest.

== Regarding vassal and constituent kingdoms ==
Throughout the history of Thailand, political power has often been structured around the Mandala system. Under this system, a central polity exerted influence over a network of subordinate polities within its sphere. The rulers of these lesser polities typically pledged allegiance to a paramount ruler, often referred to as a “high king.”

The nature of this hierarchy evolved over time. During the Ayutthaya era, the system allowed for a relatively high degree of autonomy among subordinate rulers. The king of the Ayutthaya Kingdom governed from Ayutthaya (modern-day Ayutthaya city), while rulers of other important centers, such as Suphannaphum, administered their own domains with considerable independence.

Over time, however, this autonomy diminished. The relationship increasingly resembled that of a centralized monarchy with appointed governors. The high king gained the authority to depose subordinate rulers and replace them, sometimes even installing entirely new dynasties. In some cases, such as the Kingdom of Chiang Mai, the local monarchy itself was abolished.

Subordinate rulers were not merely passive actors; they could also challenge central authority. During the Dvaravati period, it was relatively common for vassal rulers to overthrow a high king, establish their own dynasty, or break away to form a new mandala. This led to frequent shifts in regional dominance, with different polities rising to prominence as political centers.

Such upheavals became less frequent in later periods but did not disappear entirely. The last major instance of a subordinate ruler seizing power occurred in 1782, when Rama I overthrew Sanphet X and established a new dynasty. Earlier examples include coups in 1629 and 1569 but this was limited to blood relatives. By contrast, during the Dvaravati period, similar events were far more frequent, occurring in years such as 800, 859, 892, and 957, among others where commoners and local lords alike would become monarchs.

=== Composition of the Dvaravati Domain ===
List of vassals and constituents
- Dvaravati Mandala
  - Phraek Si Racha
  - Suphanburi (Suphannaphum)
  - Phetchaburi (Phripphri)
  - Lopburi (Lavo)
  - Nakhon Pathom
  - Si Thep
  - Ayutthaya (Ayothaya)
  - Sing (Jayasimhapuri)
  - Sukhothai - Si Satchanalai
  - Uthong

=== Composition of Sukhothai Domain ===
List of vassals and constituents
- Sukhothai Mandala
  - Sukhothai Kingdom
  - Si Satchanalai Kingdom

=== Composition of Ayutthaya Domain ===
List of vassals and constituents
- Ayutthaya Mandala
  - Ayothaya Sri Dvaravati
    - other fiefs, counties and duchies
  - Suphannaphum
  - Phripphri
  - Lavo
  - Thawai
  - Tanaosi
  - Sukhothai

=== Composition of Rattanakosin Domain ===
List of vassals and constituents
- Rattanakosin Mandala
  - Mainland
    - other fiefs, counties and duchies
      - Duchy of Nakhon Ratchasima
      - Duchy of Nakhon Si Thammarat
  - Shan Domains
    - Principality of Chiang Tung
    - Principality of Chiang Khaeng
    - Canton of Chiang Lap
    - Federation of 12 Tai Cantons
      - Canton of Hokamchenghung (นครเมืองหอคำเชียงรุ่ง)
      - Canton of Je (นครเมืองแจ)
      - Canton of Luang (นครเมืองลวง)
      - Canton of Hon (นครเมืองหน)
      - Canton of Hai (นครเมืองราย)
      - Canton of Ngad (นครเมืองงาด)
      - Canton of Lha (นครเมืองหล้า)
      - Canton of Hing (นครเมืองฮิง)
      - Canton of Chiang Neua (นครเมืองเชียงเหนือ)
      - Canton of Ou Neua (นครเมืองอูเหนือ)
      - Canton of Chiang Thong (เมืองเชียงทอง )
      - Canton of Phuthaen Luang (นครเมืองภูแถนหลวง)
  - Lanna Domains
    - Kingdom of Chiang Mai
    - Principality of Thoen
    - Principality of Lampang
    - Principality of Nan
    - Principality of Lamphun
    - Principality of Phrae
  - Malay Domains
    - Sultanate of Kedah
    - Kingdom of Setul Mambang Segara
    - Kingdom of Perlis
    - Kingdom of Kubang Pasu Darul Qiyam
    - Sultanate of Patani
    - Kingdom of Rahman
    - Sultanate of Terengganu
    - Kingdom of Besut Darul Iman
    - Sultanate of Kelantan
  - Lao Domains
    - Kingdom of Vientiane
    - Kingdom of Luang Phrabang
    - Kingdom of Champassak
    - Principality of Phuan
    - Principality of Phongsali
    - Federation of the 6 Hua Phan Cantons
      - Canton of Hiam (เมืองเหียม)
      - Canton of Son (เมืองซ่อน)
      - Canton of Cham Neua (เมืองชำเหนือ)
      - Canton of Cham Tay (เมืองชำใต้)
      - Canton of Kho (เมืองเชียงฆอ)
      - Canton of Sop'et (เมืองสบแอด)
      - Canton of Hua Muang (เมืองหัวเมือง)
    - Federation of the 12 Tai Lords (has more than 12 lords)
      - Canton of Lai (เมืองไล)
      - Canton of Te (เมืองแต่)
      - Canton of Jian (เมืองเจียน)
      - Canton of Mun (เมืองมุน)
      - Canton of Bang (เมืองบาง)
      - Canton of Thaeng (เมืองแถง)
      - Canton of Khwai (เมืองควาย)
      - Canton of Dung (เมืองดุง)
      - Canton of Muai (เมืองม่วย)
      - Canton of La (เมืองลา)
      - Canton on Moh (เมืองโมะ)
      - Canton of Wat (เมืองหวัด)
      - Canton of Sang (เมืองซาง)
      - Canton of So (เมืองสอ)
      - Canton of Than (เมืองถาน)
      - Canton of Lo (เมืองลอ)
  - Kingdom of Cambodia
  - Principality of Hà Tiên

== Regarding the relationship between kings, co-kings, viceroys, and deputy viceroys ==
=== Viceroy ===
In Siam, the relationship between the king and the viceroy (called the Uparaja) was based on shared rule but clear hierarchy. The king was the highest ruler, while the viceroy was usually a close relative chosen to help govern and serve as the likely successor, though this would often prove false due to other members of the family starting a succession war. The viceroy had real authority, controlling parts of the kingdom and managing government and military affairs when needed. However, all power officially came from the king, and the viceroy was expected to support and follow the monarch's decisions. Because the viceroy had his own court and influence, this system sometimes led to rivalry or competition between the two.

The viceroys had their own palace and administration in the front palace.

The position continued for many centuries until King Chulalongkorn abolished it in the late 19th century to centralize power under the monarchy.

While the viceroy is not the king, throughout the history of Siam, there were moments where these viceroys were crowned "in equal power" as the monarch, like the coronation of Rama IV and Pinklao. In which king Pinklao was crowned using the title Phrabat Somdet Phra .... Chao Yu Hua in equal ranking to the first king. Thus, allowing the front palace to institute the first king's regalia and ornamentation within the front palace which had previously been forbidden.

=== Deputy viceroy ===
The deputy viceroys had their own palace and administration in the rear palace. The deputy viceroy position was seldom bestowed. There had only been three bestowals in the last 700 years. This role is similar to the viceroys but are subservient to the king and the viceroy.

List of deputy viceroys
No.	Portrait	Regnal name	Reign from	Reign until	Notes
1		Chobkhotchaprasit นายจบคชประสิทธิ์	c.1680s		
2		Phon เจ้าฟ้าพร	1703	1708	became king King Maha Thammarachathirat II
3		Thong In สมเด็จพระเจ้าหลานเธอ เจ้าฟ้าทองอิน กรมพระราชวังบวรสถานภิมุข	1782	1806	nephew of Rama I
		vacant until the abolition of the front palace and the rear palace			

=== Co-king ===
Co-kings were monarchs which had previously abdicated, but were invited back to power. Often they were brought back with the same amount of authority as the main king. Though this usually didn't last and often voluntarily relinquished power and even refused a third co-kingship. A famous example is when King Maha Thammarachathirat III was invited back into the position of king during King Borommaracha III's reign.

== Sukhothai-Si Satchanalai city-state (679–1238) ==
=== Intharachaithirat dynasty (679–687) ===
No.	Portrait	Regnal name	Personal name	House	Reign	Succession	Notes
1		Inthrachaithirat อินทราไชยธิราช		Inthrachai	679 – 687 (9 years)	First king of a Sukhothai polity	Overthrown by Phalithirat

=== Lavo dynasty (687–c.700s) ===
No.	Portrait	Regnal name	Personal name	House	Reign	Succession	Notes
2		Phalithirat พาลีธิราช		Palithirat	687 – c.700s	Usurper Overthrew Inthrachaithirat	Son of Kalavarnadisharaja, the first King of Lavo Invaded by Suvannakhongkham Kingdom
Dvaravati suzerainty era the city was abandoned

=== Sai Nam Pueng of Phraek Si Racha dynasty (c.930s–957) ===
No.	Portrait	Regnal name	Personal name	House	Reign	Succession	Notes
3		Suthammaracha พระเจ้าสุธรรมราชา		Suthammaracha	c.930s – 957	Son of Sai Nam Phueng I	Reigned from Phitsanulok Also King of Phraek Si Racha

=== Aphaikhamini dynasty (957–c.1100s) ===
No.	Portrait	Regnal name	Personal name	House	Reign	Succession	Notes
Haripunchai suzerainty era abandoned until 957
4		Aphaikhamini พระยาอภัยคามินี		Aphaikhamini	957 – 959 (2 years)	Refounded a Sukhothai polity	A Mon noble who fled Haripunchai
5		Sri Chanthrathibodi พระยาศรีจันทราธิบดี		Chanthrathibodi	959 – late c.900s	Offered the throne (not related)	A Lavo commoner Fled Phraek Si Racha polity because Phra Chao Sinthop Amarin had ordered his arrest to become a monk. Offered the throne
As the free city-state of Si Satchanalai–Sukhodaya
6		Arunarat สมเด็จพระอรุณราช	Anuratcha Kuman เจ้าอรุณราชกุมาร	Aphaikhamini	late c.900s – 1052	A son of Aphaikhamini Offered the throne	
7		Suphatcharat เจ้าพัตตาสุจราช	Pasuja Kuman เจ้าพสุจกุมาร	Aphaikhamini	1052 – 1145	Son of Arunarat	Grandfather of Kesariraja, King of Lavo
8		Thammatrailok พระเจ้าธรรมไตรโลก		Aphaikhamini	1145 – 1155	Son of the Suphatcharat	Father of Ayothaya kings, Thammaracha and Borommaracha Father-in-law of Kesariraja Grandfather of Uthong V of Ayutthaya
9		Rachathirat เจ้าราชาธิราช		Aphaikhamini	c.1100s	Son of the Thammatrailok	only ruled in Si Satchanalai
City-state is partitioned into Sukhothai and Si Satchanalai, after this the city was ruled from Si-Satchanalai. Phraek Si Racha took over Sukhothai, and later Si-Satchanalai

=== Pathomsuriyawong/Guruwamsa dynasty (1155–1219) ===
No.	Portrait	Regnal name	Personal name	House	Reign	Succession	Notes
Indaprasthanagara suzerainty era (Phraek Si Racha Polity)
10		Phanom Thale Sri พระพนมทะเลศรี Mahesavasatithrathiratchakasat มเหศวสติทราธิราชกษัตริย์	Intharacha อินทราชา	Phetchaburi – Viang Chaiprakarn	1155 – 1157 (2 years)	Phra Pathomsuriya Thephanarathai Suwannabophit lineage Grandson of Sri Singha Conquered Sukhothai	Also King of Lavo (1150–1155), King of Singburi (1169–1188), and King of Phrip Phri (1188–1225) Traditionally considered the 23rd king of Siam. Descended from the a son of Sri Singha, Anuracha Overthrew Rachathirat
11		Suriyaracha พระเจ้าสุริยราชา		Suriyaracha	1157 – 1184 (27 years)	Cousin of Phanom Thale Sri	Also king of Kamphaeng Phet Descended from the a son of Sri Singha, Suriyawong
De facto independence
12		Chantharacha พระเจ้าจันทราชา	Chantha Kuman พระจันทกุมาร	Suriyaracha	1184 – 1214 (30 years)	Son of the Suriyaracha	Stopped sending tribute to Indaprasthanagara Father of Kamrateng An Sri Inthrabodinthrathit, first independent king of Sukhothai
13		E Daeng Phloeng อีแดงเพลิง		E Daeng Phloeng	1214 – 1219 (5 years)	Usurper (not related)	Possibly a Mon, name found in the Wat Si Chum Inscription Overthrew Chantharacha

=== 1st Sri Naw Nam Thum dynasty (1219–c.1200s) ===
No.	Portrait	Regnal name	Personal name	House	Reign	Succession	Notes
Remerged as city-state of Si Satchanalai–Sukhodaya
14		Sri Naw Nam Thum พ่อขุนศรีนาวนำถุม		Sri Naw Nam Thum	1219 – c.1200s	Usurper, Noble of Chaliang Overthrew E Daeng Phloeng	Noble from Si Satchanalai overthrowing E Daeng Phloeng, also a possible king of Sri Satchanalai

=== Suphannaphum dynasty (c.1200s) ===
No.	Portrait	Regnal name	Personal name	House	Reign	Succession	Notes
period of Suphannaphum dominance
15		Khom Sabat Khlon Lamphong ขอมสบาดโขลญลำพง	Saen Pom ท้าวแสนปม	Suphannaphum	c.1200s	Usurper	Also king of Suphannaphum Grandfather-in-law to Uthong V Grandfather to Borommarachathirat I

=== 2nd Sri Naw Nam Thum dynasty (c.1200s–1238) ===
No.	Portrait	Regnal name	Personal name	House	Reign	Succession	Notes
As the free city-state of Si Satchanalai–Sukhodaya
16		Pha Muang พ่อขุนผาเมือง		Sri Naw Nam Thum	c.1200s – 1238 (around 5 years)	Son of Sri Naw Nam Thum Overthrew Khom Sabat Khlon Lamphong	Friend and ally of Inthrabodinthrathit Brother-in-law of Inthrabodinthrathit
Pha Muang abdicated and handed over the throne to Inthrabodinthrathit, continues to reign in Si Satchanalai as a vassal kingdom under Sukhothai

== Sukhothai Kingdom (1238–1438) ==
Tai peoples migrated into mainland Southeast Asia in the 8th–10th centuries. In the years after, Northern Thai groups established mueang that evolved into larger states, such as Ngoenyang. However, it was not until the decline of the Khmer Empire in the 13th century that a Central Thai kingdom politically and culturally related to modern Thailand was first founded.

=== Phra Ruang dynasty (1238–1438; 1468–1474) ===
The Phra Ruang dynasty was the only royal lineage that ruled over the Sukhothai Kingdom, the first Central Thai state. Established by Si Inthrathit in 1238, who declared independence from the Khmer Empire, the dynasty laid the foundations for Thai society. Under Ram Khamhaeng the Great, the initial Thai script was invented and Theravāda Buddhism was established as the state religion.

The dynasty is named after the Traiphum Phra Ruang, a Buddhist cosmology book written by Maha Thammaracha I. During his reign, the kingdom was invaded by Ayutthaya, a neighboring Thai state, becoming a tributary during the reign of Maha Thammaracha II.

In the Sukhothai Kingdom, the monarch ruled from the city of Sukhothai, while the heir presumptive would occasionally be named uparaja, or viceroy, and ruled in Si Satchanalai. In 1438, Ayutthaya annexed Sukhothai at the death of Maha Thammaracha IV when Borommarachathirat II of Ayutthaya named his son Prince Ramesuan uparaja. In Ayutthaya, the tradition would evolve into the Front Palace system.

No.	Portrait	Regnal name	Ceremonial Name	Personal name	Spouse	House	Life Details	Succession	Notes	Viceroy
1		Inthrabodinthrathit กมรเตงอัญศรีอินทรบดินทราทิตย์		Si Inthrathit พ่อขุนศรีอินทราทิตย์ Bang Klang Hao ขุนบางกลางหาว	Queen Seuang	Suriyaracha	born 1188 reigned 1238–1270 32 years death 1270 82 years	First King of Sukhothai Son of Chantharacha Descendant of Phra Pathomsuriya Thephanarathai Suwannabophit Founded a new Dynasty	Ruled locally in the Khmer Empire as Bang Klang Hao. His rebellion led to the establishment of Sukhothai, the first Central Thai kingdom	Vacant
2		Ban Mueang ขุนบานเมือง		Ban บาน	no known queen	Suriyaracha	born 1237 reigned 1270–1279 9 years death 1279 42 years	Son of Si Inthrathit	Namesake for birth name of Maha Thammaracha IV	Ram (brother)
3		Rammarat the Great, the Bold พระบาทกมรเตงอัญศรีรามราช		Ram Khamhaeng the Great พ่อขุนรามคำแหงมหาราช	no known queen	Ram Khamhaeng	born 1237/1247 reigned 1279–1298 19 years death 1298 61 years	Son of Si Inthrathit	Oversaw the height of Sukhothai prosperity, the development of the Thai script, and the propagation of Theravada Buddhism within Sukhothai	Vacant
—		Sai Songkhram พญาไสสงคราม			no queen	Ram Khamhaeng	born unknown regency 1298 death unknown	Son of Ram Khamhaeng	Reigned as regent until Loe Thai ascended	Vacant
4		Loe Thai พระยาเลอไทย			no queen	Ram Khamhaeng	born 1262 reigned 1298–1323 25 years death 1323 61 years	Son of Ram Khamhaeng	Brother of Burmese queen consort May Hnin Thwe-Da. His reign saw the decline of Sukhothai, as regions conquered by Ram Khamhaeng broke away	Li Thai (son)
5		Ngua Nam Thum พระยางั่วนำถุม			no queen	Si Inthrathit	born 1266 reigned 1323–1347 24 years death 1347 81 years	Son of Ban Mueang	Brother of Burmese queen consort May Hnin Htapi. Origin of his name is disputed	Li Thai (first cousin once removed)
—		name unknown			no queen	Si Inthrathit	born unknown reigned 1347 death unknown	Son of Ngua Nam Thum	Crowned after Ngua Nam Thum, then Li Thai, then lord of Si Satchanalai and viceroy, marched his army and overthrown a son of Ngua Nam Thum in a coup where "he killed all his enemies".	Vacant
Succession crisis of 1347										Vacant
6		Maha Thammaracha I พระมหาธรรมราชาที่ ๑	Phrabat Kamrateng An Sri Suriyaphong Ram Maha Thammarachathirat พระบาทกมรเตงอัญศรีสุริยพงษ์รามมหาธรรมราชาธิราช	Li Thai พระยาลิไทย Luethai ฦๅไทย	Queen Si Thammaratmada	Ram Khamhaeng	born 1300 reigned 1347–1368 21 years death 1368 68 years	Son of Loe Thai Overthrew son of Ngua Nam Thum	Known for his devotion to Buddhist philosophy and writing. During his reign, Ayutthaya began to invade into Sukhothai	Vacant
1378: Sukhothai became a tributary state of the Ayutthaya Kingdom
7		Maha Thammaracha II พระมหาธรรมราชาที่ ๒		Lue Thai พระยาลือไทย	Queen Rajadevi Sri	Ram Khamhaeng	born 1358 reigned 1368–1400 32 years death 1400 42 years	Son of Maha Thammaracha I	Born Lue Thai. Under his rule, the dynasty continued under tributary status	Vacant
8		Maha Thammaracha III พระมหาธรรมราชาที่ ๓	Somdet Maha Thammarachathibodi Sri Suriyawong สมเด็จ มหาธรรมราชาธิบดี ศรีสุริยวงศ์	Sai Lue Thai พระยาไสลือไทย	Concubine Sakha	Ram Khamhaeng	born 1380 reigned 1400–1419 19 years death 1419 39 years	Son of Maha Thammaracha II	Born Sai Lue Thai	Vacant
Succession crisis of 1419										Vacant
9		Maha Thammaracha IV พระมหาธรรมราชาที่ ๔		Borommapan พระยาบรมปาล	no known queen	Ram Khamhaeng	born 1401 reigned 1419–1438 19 years death 1438 37 years	Son of Maha Thammaracha III Succession War	Born Borommapan. Won the throne against his brother after the intervention of King Intharachathirat of Ayutthaya. Upon his death, King Borommarachathirat II of Ayutthaya installed his son as uparaja, ending the Phra Ruang succession	Yutthisathian (son)
1438: De facto annexation into Ayutthaya, ending Sukhothai autonomy

=== 1st Suphannaphum dynasty (1438–1468) ===
No.	Portrait	Regnal name	Personal name	Reign	Succession	Life details	Viceroy
10		Borommatrailokkanat สมเด็จพระบรมไตรโลกนาถ	Ramesuan II พระราเมศวร ที่ ๒	1438 – 1468 (30 years)	Grandson of Maha Thammaracha II Son of Borommarachathirat II	1431 – 1488 (aged approx. 57) Installed by Borommarachathirat II as viceroy of Sukhothai, tying Sukhothai in a personal union after becoming king of Ayutthaya.	Vacant

=== 2nd Phra Ruang Dynasty (1468–1474) ===
No.	Portrait	Regnal name	Personal name	House	Reign	Succession	Notes	Viceroy
11		Yutthisathian พระยายุทธิษเฐียร		Ram Khamhaeng	1468 – 1474 (6 years)	Son of Maha Thammaracha IV	c.1420s – c.1480s (mentioned) (aged approx. 60) Was to be appointed the viceroy under Borommatrailokkanat, instead was appointed Phraya Songkhwae (Phitsanulok). Sometime later, he was appointed viceroy of Sukhothai. Removed as viceroy, appointed ruler of Phayao stripped of all titles and lands in 1479	Vacant

=== 2nd Suphannaphum dynasty (1474–1529) ===
No.	Portrait	Regnal name	Personal name	Reign	Succession	Life details	Viceroy
(10)		Borommatrailokkanat สมเด็จพระบรมไตรโลกนาถ	Ramesuan II พระราเมศวร ที่ ๒	1474 – 1485 (11 years)	Grandson of Maha Thammaracha II Son of Borommarachathirat II	Second reign due to the removal of Yutthisathian	-
12		Ramathibodi II สมเด็จพระรามาธิบดีที่ ๒	Chetthathirat พระเชษฐาธิราช	1485 – 1529 (44 years)	Great-Grandson of Maha Thammaracha II Son of Borommatrailokkanat	1472 – 1529 (aged approx. 57) Installed by Borommatrailokkanat as viceroy of Sukhothai	Vacant
1529: De jure annexation into Ayutthaya, as the position of Viceroy (Uparat) of Sukhothai was now defunct

== Siamese Confederation (700–1351) ==
=== 1st Pathomsuriyawong/Guruwamsa dynasty (700–c.800s) ===
No.	Portrait	Regnal name	Personal name	House	Reign	Succession	Notes
Founding of Phraek Si Racha
1		Komerat โกเมราช		Komerat	700 – c.700s	Founded Phraek Si Racha polity	
2		Ketumala เกตุมาลา		Komerat	c.700s – 757	Son of Komerat	concurrent with king Phalitbodichai of Lavo (son of Phalithirat of Sukhothai-Si Satchanalai)
3		Phra Pathomsuriya Thephanarathai Suwannabophit พระปฐมสุริยเทพนรไทยสุวรรณบพิตร Somdet Phra Pathom Suriya Narani Saworabophit สมเด็จพระปฐมสุริยนาราณีศวรบพิตร		Komerat	757 – 800 (43 years)	Adopted Son of Ketumala	Canonically the first king of all Siam, the ancestor to both Sukhothai and Ayutthaya monarchs. King of all Dvaravati polity: Nakhon Pathom, Si Thep, Phraek Si Racha, and Lopburi. Recorded name: Pra Poat honne Sourittep pennaratui sonanne bopitra
4		Pathum Kuman ปทุมกุมาร		Komerat	800 – c.800s	Son of Pathomsuriya	concurrent with king Sikarat of Kamlanka
Fell under Si Thep c.800s - 859

=== Athitayarat dynasty (c.800s–859) ===
No.	Portrait	Regnal name	Personal name	House	Reign	Succession	Notes
5		Athitayarat อาทิตยราช		Athitayarat	c.800s – 859 (around 25 years)	Usurper	Also king of Syamapura (Sithep) Obtained the emerald buddha into Siamese hands: concurrent with king Sikarat of Kamlanka; concurrent with king Kamsa of Kamlanka; concurrent with king Padum Kumara of Phraek Si Racha

=== Pharattakap dynasty (859–892) ===
No.	Portrait	Regnal name	Personal name	House	Reign	Succession	Notes
6		Pharattakap พระเจ้าภะรัตกับ		Pharattakap	859 – 892 (33 years)	Usurper	concurrent with king Vasuthep of Lavo; concurrent with king Balarat of Kamlanka; concurrent with king Bhagadatta of Si Thep

=== Sai Nam Pueng of Phraek Si Racha dynasty (892–957) ===
No.	Portrait	Regnal name	Personal name	House	Reign	Succession	Notes
7		Sai Nam Phueng I พระเจ้าสายน้ำผึ้งที่ ๑		Suthammaracha	892 – 922 (30 years)	Usurper	Former noble in the court of the previous: concurrent with king Balarat of Kamlanka; concurrent with king Uchitthaka of Lavo; concurrent with Sri Suntharaprakrom of Si Thep
8		Suthammaracha พระเจ้าสุธรรมราชา		Suthammaracha	922 – 957 (35 years)	Son of Sai Nam Phueng I	concurrent with Si Suntharavoraman of Si Thep; concurrent with Narupati Singhavoraman of Si Thep; Also king of Sukhothai
Polity splits into two branches: Phraek Si Racha and Phitsanulok

=== Sunthop Amarin dynasty (937–996) ===
No.	Portrait	Regnal name	Personal name	Reign	Succession	Notes
9		Sinthop Amarin พระเจ้าสินธพอมรินทร์	Kraek พญาแกรก	937 – 996 (59 years) concurrent with the former	Usurper	Unified Phraek Sri Racha and Ayothaya-Lopburi

=== 2nd Pathomsuriyawong/Guruwamsa dynasty (957–1132) ===
No.	Portrait	Regnal name	Personal name	House	Reign	Succession	Notes
10		Wisanuracha พระเจ้าวิษณุราชา		Wisanu	957 – 987 (30 years)	Phra Pathomsuriya Thephanarathai Suwannabophit lineage (Exact relation unknown)	Phitsanulok line. King of a Dvaravati polity: Phitsanulok. Incursions by the Khmer empire, prompted the polity to lose influence around Lopburi and Phraek Si Racha: concurrent with Sunthorathet of Phraek and Lavo; concurrent with Pansa of Suphannaphum
11		Sunthorathet Mahathepharat พญาสุนทรเทศมหาเทพราช		Sunthorathet	996 –1005 (9 years) concurrent with the former and latter	Phra Pathomsuriya Thephanarathai Suwannabophit lineage (Exact relation unknown)	Phraek Si Racha line Canonically the 11th king of all Siam. King of two Dvaravati polity: Lopburi and Phraek Si Racha. Recorded name: Ipoia Sanne Thora Thesma Teperat End of his line: concurrent with Wisanuracha of Phitsanulok
12		Pichairacha พระเจ้าพิไชยราชา		Phichai	987 – 1027 (40 years)	Younger Brother of Wisanuracha	great-great-great-grandfather of Si Intharathit great-great-grandfather of Uthong II: concurrent with Pansa of Suphannaphum; concurrent with Rampandit of Suphannaphum
13		Sri Singha พระเจ้าศรีสิงห์		Phichai	1027 – 1062 (35 years)	Son of Pichairacha	concurrent with Ang Indra of Suphannaphum; concurrent with Chantharachot of Lavo
Civil war in the Chao Phraya basin
14		Surintharacha พระเจ้าสุรินทราชา		Pichai	1062 – 1100 (38 years)	Son of Sri Singha	concurrent with all 8 monarchs of Jayasimhapuri; concurrent with Kar Tayy of Suphannaphum concurrent with Narai of Lavo
Lavo and Ayothaya splits off
15		Suriyawong พระเจ้าพระสุริยวงศ์		Suriyawong	1100 – 1132 (32 years)	Younger Brother of Surintharacha	concurrent with Sri Thammasokarat I of Nakhon Si Thammarat and Phraek Si Racha; concurrent with Kesariracha of Lavo
Phraek Si Racha splits, Chai Nat line continues through the first son of Sri Singha, Surintharacha. Sing buri line continues to the second son, Anuracha. (Chai Nat line later ruling Ayutthaya, and Singburi line later ruling Sukhothai) Pathom Suriyawong dynasty lost control until Uthong II regained control of the region.

=== Ramanwamsa dynasty (1082–1087) ===
No.	Portrait	Regnal name	Personal name	House	Reign	Succession	Notes
Incursions from Haripunchai
16		Chantharachot พระจันทรโชติ		Chantharachot	1052–1069 (17 years) concurrent with the former	Usurper Son of Chanthrathewarat of Suphannaphum	Originally a Suphannaphum prince, his older brother ruled Haripunchai, and then usurped the Lavo throne, enthroning Chandrachota: concurrent with Ang Indra of Suphannaphum; concurrent with Sri Singha of Phraek Si Racha
17		Narai พระนารายณ์		Chantharachot	1069 – 1087 (18 years) concurrent with the former	Son of Chandrachota of Lavo	Founded modern Ayutthaya city and king of Lavo: concurrent with Kar Tayy of Suphannaphum; concurrent with Surintharacha of Phraek Si Racha
War of the nine Ayothaya clans
vacant 1087-1089

=== Luang dynasty (1089–1111) ===
No.	Portrait	Regnal name	Personal name	House	Reign	Succession	Notes
War of the nine Ayothaya clans
18		Luang พระเจ้าหลวง		Luang	1089 – 1111 (22 years)	Usurper	concurrent with Suriyawang of Phraek Si Racha

=== Sai Nam Pueng of Ayothaya dynasty (1111–1205) ===
No.	Portrait	Regnal name	Personal name	House	Reign	Succession	Notes
19		Sai Nam Peung II พระเจ้าสายน้ำผึ้งที่ ๒		Thammikkaracha	1111 – 1165 (54 years)	Offered the throne	Commoner: concurrent with Sri Thammasokarat II of Nakhon Si Thammarat, Praek Sri Racha and Lavo; concurrent with Phanom Thale Sri of Siam
20		Thammikkaracha I พระเจ้าธรรมิกราชา ที่ ๑	Phrabat Somdet Phra Ramathibodi Sriwisutthiburusodom Borommachakkraphat Thammikaraja Dechochaithepadithep Triphuwanathibet Barombophit Phra Phutthi Chao Yu Hua พระบาทสมเดจ์พระรามาธิบดีศรีวิสุทธิบุรุโสดมบรมจักรพรรดิธรรมิกกราชเดโชไชเทพาดิเทพตรีภูวนาธิเบศ บรมบพิตรพระพุทธิเจ้าอยู่หัว	Thammikkaracha	1165 – 1205 (40 years)	Son of Sai Nam Peung	Full regnal name according to the Miscellaneous Laws (Phra Aiyakan Betset) under the parent law, Three Seals Law, enacted in 1225 AD (BE 1768): Phrabat Somdet Phra Ramathibodi Sriwisutthiburusodom Borommachakkraphat Thammikaraja Dechochaithepadithep Triphuwanathibet Barombophit Phra Phutthi Chao Yu Hua (Thai: พระบาทสมเดจ์พระรามาธิบดีศรีวิสุทธิบุรุโสดมบรมจักรพรรดิธรรมิกกราชเดโชไชเทพาดิเทพตรีภูวนาธิเบศ บรมบพิตรพระพุทธิเจ้าอยู่หัว): concurrent with Phanom Thale Sri of Siam; concurrent with Uthong I of Suphannaphum

=== 3rd Pathomsuriyawong/Guruwamsa dynasty (1132–1167) ===
No.	Portrait	Regnal name	Personal name	House	Reign	Succession	Notes
21		Lop Mahasombat พระเจ้าโลภมหาสมบัติ (posthumous)	Anuracha พระเจ้าอนุราชา	Anuracha	1132– 1167 (35 years) concurrent with the former	Phra Pathomsuriya Thephanarathai Suwannabophit lineage Son of Sri Singha Overthrew Suriyawong (brother)	Overthrew Suriyawong, moved capital from Chai Nat to Singburi: concurrent with Sai Nam Peung II of Ayothaya
(-)		Uthong I พระเจ้าอู่ทองที่ ๑		Anuracha	1163– 1205 (42 years) concurrent with the former	Son of Anuracha	Ruled in Suphannaphum and Jayasimhapuri: concurrent with Sai Nam Peung II of Ayothaya; concurrent with Phanom Thale Sri of Siam; concurrent with Anuracha of Singburi

=== Pathummawong dynasty (1167–1180) ===
No.	Portrait	Regnal name	Personal name	House	Reign	Succession	Notes
22		Sri Thammasokarat II ศรีธรรมโศกราชที่ ๒ Chantharaphanu I จันทรภาณุที่ ๑	Narabodi พญานรบดี	Thammasokarat	1167 – 1180 (13 years)	Usurper	Line of Nakhon si Thammarat kings Got removed from the Chao Phraya Basin area, and continued ruling the Kra Isthmus: concurrent with Sai Nam Peung II of Ayothaya; concurrent with Phanom Thale Sri of Siam

=== 4th Pathomsuriyawong/Guruwamsa dynasty, House of Phetchaburi–Viang Chaiprakarn (1180–1351) ===
No.	Portrait	Regnal name	Ceremonial Name	Personal name	House	Reign	Succession	Notes
The confederation is consolidated under Phra Phanom Thale Sri
23		Phanom Thale Sri พระพนมทะเลศรี Mahesavasatithrathiratchakasat มเหศวสติทราธิราชกษัตริย์		Intharacha อินทราชา	Phetchaburi – Viang Chaiprakarn	1180– 1205 (25 years)	Phra Pathomsuriya Thephanarathai Suwannabophit lineage Grandson of Sri Singha Son of Anuracha Brother of Uthong I Overthrew Sri Thammasokarat II	Canonically the 23rd king of all Siam. King of five Dvaravati polity: Lopburi, Phraek Si Racha, Phripphri, Sukhothai-Nakhon Thai, and Singburi. Recorded name: Pra Poa Noome Thele Seri: concurrent with king Thammikkaracha of Ayothaya; concurrent with Uthong I of Suphannaphum
24		Uthong II พระเจ้าอู่ทองที่ ๒ Mahitharaworaman III มหิธรวรมันที่ ๓			Phetchaburi – Viang Chaiprakarn	1205 – 1253 (48 years)	Son of Phra Phanom Thale Sri Son-in-law of Thammikkaracha	Grandson of Anuracha Great-grandson of Sri Singha: concurrent with Thao Saen Pom of Suphannaphum; concurrent with king Thonglanrach of Phrippphri
25		Chaiyasen พระเจ้าชัยเสน			Chaiyasen	1253 – 1289 (36 years)	Son-in-law of Uthong II	concurrent with Uthong III of Suphannaphum
26		Suwannaracha พระเจ้าสุวรรณราชา		Suwanna Kuman เจ้าสุวรรณกุมาร	Phetchaburi – Viang Chaiprakarn	1289 – 1301 (12 years)	Grandson of Uthong II Son of Chaiyathat of Uthong II Adopted son of Chaiyasen Nephew of Chaiyasen	Xiān began to invade Angkor and Melayu in the 1290s. Xiān sent tributes to China five times during 1292 to 1299.
27		Thammaracha พระเจ้าธรรมราชา			Aphaikhamini	1301 – 1310 (9 years)	Son-in-law of Suwannaracha. Pathomsuriyawong Dynasty (by marriage)	Son of Thammatrailok of Sukhothai-Si Satchanalai Originally of Aphaikhamini Dynasty
28		Ramathibodi สมเด็จพระเจ้ารามาธิบดี	Phrabat Somdet Phrachao Ramathibodi Sri Wisuthisuthiwong Ongkhapurisodom Borommachakkraphat Rachathirat Triphuwanathibet Borombophit Phraphuttha Chao Yu Hua พระบาทสมเด็จพระเจ้ารามาธิบดีศรี วิสุทธิสุธิวงศ์องคปุริโสดม บรมจักรพรรดิราชาธิราชตรีภูวนาธิเบศบรมบพิตรพระพุทธเจ้าอยู่หัว	Borommaracha สมเด็จพระเจ้าบรมราชา	Aphaikhamini	1310 – 1344 (34 years)	Brother of Thammaracha Son-in-law of Suwannaracha. Pathomsuriyawong Dynasty (by marriage)	1313–1315 Xiān invasion of Champa. Son of Thammatrailok of Sukhothai-Si Satchanalai Originally of Aphaikhamini Dynasty: concurrent with Uthong IV of Suphannaphum; concurrent with Sam of Phripphri
Uthong III and Uthong IV is a part of Suphannaphum's Kings and not a part of Lavo-Ayodaya's Kings Uthong later became Uthong V when he inherited Suphannaphum-Phripphri
29		Uthong พระเจ้าอู่ทอง		Worachetha Kuman วรเชษฐกุมาร	Aphaikhamini	1344 – 1369 (25 years)	Son of Borommaracha After King Phraek Si Racha of the Lavapura seat passed, the throne passed through his daughter Son Sai, onto her son, the governor of Ayodhya: Phra Chao Uthong Founded a new Dynasty	Heir to Lavo, Succeeded all Dvaravati polities: Phripphri, Lavo, Suphannaphum, and Ayothaya, canonically the 27th king of Siam. Brother-in-law to Uthong IV of Suphannaphum Son of Borommaracha of Ayothaya. Grandnephew to Sam of Phripphri Brother-in-law to Pha Ngua of Suphannaphum. great-great-grandson of Uthong II of Lavo grandson of Thammatriloka of Sukhothai-Si Satchanalai
Governorship of Lavo merged with the Ayutthaya governorship when Uthong inherited Lavo; Lavo merged into the Ayutthayan crown in 1388

== Ayutthaya Kingdom (1351–1767) ==
The Ayutthaya Kingdom was a result of a unification between two states: the Kingdom of Suphannaphum (Suphanburi) and the Kingdom of Lavo. Though the Kingdom of Lavo was originally a Mon kingdom, the migration of the Tai peoples into the Chao Phraya basin replaced the original Mons, consequently becoming the governors of these regions. This resulted in the capital moving from Lavapura (Lopburi) and Suphannaphum (Suphanburi) to Ayodhya (Old Ayutthaya), a new capital. Later on, the Kingdom of Nakhon si Thammarat came under the influence of Ayutthaya after seceding from Sukhothai, and Sukhothai losing influence and coming under Ayutthayan influence.

This conflict would last long into the history of Ayutthaya Kingdom, where families from the four major regional kingdoms vie over the throne of the kingdom. These kingdoms are: Kingdom of Nakhon Si Thammarat, Kingdom of Sukhothai, Kingdom of Lavo, and Kingdom of Suphannaphum. The Kingdom of Sukhothai was integrated into the Kingdom of Ayutthaya along with its noble families.

=== 1st Uthong dynasty (1351–1370) ===
No.	Portrait	Regnal name	Ceremonial Name	Personal name	House	Life Details	Succession
Uthong V inherits all Dvaravati polity: Phripphri, Suphannaphum, Ayothaya, and Lavo, beginning of the Constituent Kingdoms Era bestowed with new titles
1		Ramathibodi I of Lavo-Ayutthaya สมเด็จพระรามาธิบดีที่ ๑ Uthong V of Suphannaphum-Phripphri พระเจ้าอู่ทองที่ ๕	Somdet Phra Ramathibodi Sitsunthon Borommapophit Phra Phutthachao Yuhua สมเด็จพระรามาธิบดีศรีสุนทรบรมบพิตรพระพุทธเจ้าอยู่หัว	Worachetha Kuman วรเชษฐกุมาร	Aphaikhamini	born 3 April 1314 reigned 1351–1369 18 years death 1369 55 years	First King of Ayutthaya First King of Unified Lavo-Suphannaphum-Phripphri (Siam Confederation) Descendant of Phra Pathomsuriya Thephanarathai Suwannabophit Son-in-law of Uthong III of Suphannaphum Son of Boromracha of Lavo began his reign on 4 March 1351
2		Ramesuan I สมเด็จพระราเมศวร ที่ ๑			Aphaikhamini	born 1339 reigned 1369–1370 abdicated <1yr death 1395 56 years	Former King of Lavo Son of Ramathibodi I First Reign
Succession crisis of 1369

=== 1st Suphannaphum dynasty (1370–1388) ===
As previously mentioned, the kingdom of Ayutthaya was the result of the unification between two federations: Lavo and Suphannaphum. The ruling dynasty of Lavo gave rise to the Uthong Dynasty, in which the Suphannaphum dynasty came from the Suphannaphum federation. This federation held significant influence within the kingdom leading them to take control of the throne in 1310.

Suphannaphum Crown and Suphannaphum Constituent King Seat
Regnal name	Reign from	Reign until	Notes
Uthong I	1163	1205	Younger brother of Pra Poa Noome Thele Seri, King of Phip Phli
Uthong II	1205	Unknown	Son of Pra Poa Noome Thele Seri; Potentially ruled from Ayodhya
Vacant	Unknown	Mid-13th-C.	
Saenpom	Unknown (Mid to late 13th century)		Possible Khom Sabat Khlon Lamphong; Suphan Buri was a tributary state of the Sukhothai Kingdom (1283–1298)
Uthong III	Unknown	1335	Son of Saenpom; Possible father or father-in-law of Pha Ngua
Uthong IV	1335	1351	Son of Uthong III
Pha Ngua	1351	1370	Foundation of the Ayutthaya Kingdom (1351); Later became King Borommarachathirat I
Sri Thephahurat	1370	1374	Younger brother or son of Borommarachathirat I; Father or relative of Nakhon In; Born into a Suphannaphum father and a Phra Ruang mother
Nakhon In	1374	1408	Also the crown prince of Xiānluó; Later became King Intharachathirat
Ai Phaya	1408	1424	Son of Intharachathirat; Older brother of Borommarachathirat II
Suphannaphum merged into the Ayutthayan crown

No.	Portrait	Regnal name	Ceremonial Name	Personal name	House	Life Details	Succession
3		Borommarachathirat I สมเด็จพระบรมราชาธิราชที่ ๑		Pha Ngua ขุนหลวงพะงั่ว	Pha Ngua	born 1310 reigned 1370–1388 18 years death 1388 78 years	Former king of Suphannaphum Descendant of Suphannaphum Kingdom's Royals Son of Boromracha of Suphannaphum Son-in-law of Boromracha of Lavo Overthrew Ramesuan
4		Thong Lan สมเด็จพระเจ้าทองลัน			Pha Ngua	born 1374 reigned 1388 7 days death 1388 14 years	Son of Borommarachathirat I

=== 2nd Uthong dynasty (1388–1409) ===
No.	Portrait	Regnal name	Ceremonial Name	Personal name	House	Life Details	Succession
(2)		Ramesuan I สมเด็จพระราเมศวร ที่ ๑			Aphaikhamini	born 1339 reigned 1388–1395 7 years death 1395 56 years	Second Reign Son of Ramathibodi I Overthrew Thong Lan
5		Ramrachathirat สมเด็จพระรามราชาธิราช		Ram Chao สมเด็จพญารามเจ้า	Aphaikhamini	born 1356 reigned 1395–1405 10 years death unknown unknown	Son of Ramesuan

=== 2nd Suphannaphum dynasty (1409–1569) ===
No.	Portrait	Regnal name	Ceremonial Name	Personal name	Spouse	House	Life Details	Succession	Viceroy
Annexation of the constituent kingdom of Lavo into the Suphannaphum crown, the Suphannaphum and Lavo Crown is merged to form the Ayutthayan Crown
6		Nakhon Intharachathirat สมเด็จพระนครอินทราชาธิราช		Nakhon In เจ้านครอินทร์	Queen a princess of Sukhothai	Nakhon In	born 1359 reigned 1409–1424 15 years death 1424 65 years	Former king of Suphannaphum Son of Borommarachathirat I Grandson of Loe Thai Descendant of Phra Pathomsuriya Thephanarathai Suwannabophit Overthrew Ramrachathirat	
Sukhothai comes into the Ayutthayan crown as a constituent kingdom
Succession crisis of 1424
7		Borommarachathirat II สมเด็จพระบรมราชาธิราชที่ ๒		Sam Phraya เจ้าสามพระยา	Queen a princess of Sukhothai	Nakhon In	born 1386 reigned 1424–1448 24 years death 1448 62 years	Son of Nakhon Intharachathirat Grandson of Maha Thammaracha I Succession War, won by not participating	Ramesuan (son)
Transformation of a confederational system into a feudal mandala system
8		Borommatrailokkanat สมเด็จพระบรมไตรโลกนาถ	Somdet Phra Ramathibodi Borommatrailokkanat Mahamongkut Thepphayamanut Borisut Suriyawong Ong Phutthangkun Borommapophit สมเด็จพระรามาธิบดีบรมไตรโลกนาถ มหามงกุฎเทพยมนุษย์ บริสุทธิสุริยวงศ์ องค์พุทธางกูรบรมบพิตร	Ramesuan II พระราเมศวร ที่ ๒	no Queen	Nakhon In	born 1431 reigned 1448–1488 40 years death 1488 57 years	Former Viceroy of Sukhothai Son of Borommarachathirat II Grandson of Maha Thammaracha II	Chettha (son&brother)
9		Borommarachathirat III สมเด็จพระบรมราชาธิราชที่ ๓		Borommaracha พระบรมราชา	no Queen	Nakhon In	born 1462 reigned 1488–1491 3 years death 1491 29 years	Son of Borommatrailokkanat Great-Grandson of Maha Thammaracha II	Chettha (son&brother)
10		Ramathibodi II สมเด็จพระรามาธิบดีที่ ๒		Chetthathirat I พระเชษฐาธิราชที่ ๑	Queen a princess of Sukhothai	Chettha	born 1473 reigned 1491–1529 38 years death 1529 56 years	Former Viceroy of Sukhothai Son of Borommatrailokkanat Great-Grandson of Maha Thammaracha II	Athittayawong (son)
11		Borommarachathirat IV สมเด็จพระบรมราชาธิราชที่ ๔		Athittayawong พระอาทิตยวงศ์	Queen a princess of Sukhothai	Chettha	born 1488 reigned 1529–1533 4 years death 1533 45 years	Former Viceroy of Sukhothai Son of Ramathibodi II	Chairacha (brother)
12		Ratsadathirat the young สมเด็จพระรัษฎาธิราช		Ratthathiratkuman รัฏฐาธิราชกุมาร	no Queen	Chettha	born 1529 reigned 1533 5 months death 1533 4 years	Son of Borommarachathirat IV (under a regency)	Vacant
13		Chairachathirat สมเด็จพระไชยราชาธิราช			Supreme Queen Chitrawadi Queen of the Left Si Sudachan	Chairacha	born 1499 reigned 1533–1546 13 years death 1546 47 years	It is possile that he converted to Roman Catholicism and taking the name: Dom João. Though there are no document saying directly, only saying that maybe he converted. Younger Brother of Borommarachathirat IV Overthrew Ratsadathirat	Vacant
-		Queen Regent Si Sudachan นางพระยาแม่หัวศรีสุดาจันทร์		Dame Si Sudachan ท้าวศรีสุดาจันทร์	King Chairachathirat KingWorawongsathirat	Chairacha	born unknown regency 1546–1548 2 years death 1548 13 years	Regent for her son Yotfa following Chairachathirat's death; installed her lover Worawongsathirat as co-regent, then king	Vacant
14		Yotfa สมเด็จพระยอดฟ้า			no Queen	Chairacha	born 1535 reigned 1546–1548 2 years death 1548 13 years	Son of Chairachathirat	Vacant
—		Worawongsathirat ขุนวรวงศาธิราช		Bunsi บุญศรี	Queen Si Sudachan	Bunsi	born 1503 reigned 1548 5 months death 1549 46 years	Count of Ayutthaya Step-father of Yotfa Overthrew Yotfa	Chan (brother)
Annexation of Sukhothai into the Ayutthayan crown and partitioned into provinces, abolishment of the viceroy of Sukhothai title
15		Maha Chakkraphat the White Elephant สมเด็จพระมหาจักรพรรดิ	Somdet Phra Mahachakkraphat Rachathirat Ramintharathibodintharachen Suriyentharasodomara Chaisawanthipat สมเด็จพระมหาจักรพรรดิราชาธิราช รามินทรธิบดินทราเชน สุริเยนทรยโสดมราไชสวรรยาธิปัต	Chang Pheuak พระเจ้าช้างเผือก Thianracha พระเทียรราชา	Queen Si Suriyothai	Thianracha	born 1509 reigned 1548–1564 16 years 1568–1569 1 year death 1569 60 years	Younger Brother of Borommarachathirat IV and Chairachathirat Overthrew Worawongsathirat Abdicated and Entered Monkhood (1564–1568)	Ramesuan (son)
15		Maha Chakkraphat the White Elephant สมเด็จพระมหาจักรพรรดิ	Somdet Phra Mahachakkraphat Rachathirat Ramintharathibodintharachen Suriyentharasodomara Chaisawanthipat สมเด็จพระมหาจักรพรรดิราชาธิราช รามินทรธิบดินทราเชน สุริเยนทรยโสดมราไชสวรรยาธิปัต	Chang Pheuak พระเจ้าช้างเผือก Thianracha พระเทียรราชา	Queen Si Suriyothai	Thianracha	born 1509 reigned 1548–1564 16 years 1568–1569 1 year death 1569 60 years	De facto second reign as co-king, installed by Mahinthrathirat	Mahin (son)
16		Mahinthrathirat สมเด็จพระมหินทราธิราช			no Queen	Thianracha	born 1539 reigned 1564–1569 5 years death 1569 30 years	Son of Maha Chakkraphat and Suriyothai	Vacant
First Fall of Ayutthaya

=== Sukhothai dynasty (1569–1629) ===
No.	Portrait	Regnal name	Ceremonial Name	Personal name	Spouse	House	Life Details	Succession	Viceroy
Vassal of the First Toungoo Empire (1569–1584)
17		Sanphet I สมเด็จพระสรรเพชญ์ที่ ๑ (Name given by Bayinnaung - Toungoo Emperor ) Maha Thammarachathirat I สมเด็จพระมหาธรรมราชาธิราชที่ ๑	Somdet Phra Chao Sanphet Wong Kurasuriyakhodom Borommarachathirat Rames Pariwet Thammikarat Dechochai Phromthepadi Thep Naru Badin Phuminthra Thep Sommot Ratcha Borommaphopit Phra Phuttha Chao Yu Hua สมเด็จพระเจ้าสรรเพชญวงศ์กุรสุริโคดม บรมราชาธิราชราเมศ ปริเวทธรรมิกราช เดโชชัย พรหมเทพาดิเทพนฤบดินทร์ ภูมิทรเทพสมมติราชบรมบพิตรพระพุทธเจ้าอยู่หัว	Phirenthorathep ขุนพิเรนเทพ Maha Thammaracha V สมเด็จพระมหาธรรมราชาที่ ๕ (Name given by King Maha Chakkraphat)	Supreme Queen Wisutkasat	Maha Thammaracha	born 1517 reigned 1569–1590 21 years death 1590 73 years	Former Viceroy of Phitsanulok-Sukhothai and the Northern Territories Descendant of the Phra Ruang Dynasty of Sukhothai Son-in-law of Maha Chakkraphat Installed by Bayinnaung of Toungoo Empire	Naresuan (son)
Independence from the First Toungoo Empire, 1584
18		Sanphet II the Great, the Black Prince สมเด็จพระสรรเพชญ์ที่ ๒	Somdej Boromabatbongkot Laksana Akaburisodboromnhonra Chaofah Naret Chetthathibodi สมเดจ์บรมบาทบงกชลักษณอัคบุริโสดมบรมหน่อนราเจ้าฟ้านเรศเชษฐาธิบดี	Naresuan the Great สมเด็จพระนเรศวรมหาราช	Supreme Queen Montri Rattana Queen Yodaya Mibaya Queen Ekkasatri	Maha Thammaracha	born 1555 reigned 1590–1605 15 years death 1605 50 years	Son of Sanphet I	Ekathotsarot (brother)
19		Sanphet III the White Prince สมเด็จพระสรรเพชญ์ที่ ๓	Phra Si Sanphet Somdet Borommarachathirat Ramathibodi Si Sinthon Mahachakkraphatson Bowon Ratchathipbodin Tharininthrathirat etc. etc. พระศรีสรรเพชญ์ สมเด็จบรมราชาธิราชรามาธิบดี ศรีสินทรมหาจักรพรรดิสร บวรราชาธิบดินทร์ ธรณินทราธิราชฯ	Ekathotsarot สมเด็จพระเอกาทศรถ	no Queen	Ekathotsarot	born 1557 reigned 1605–1610 5 years death 1610 53 years	Son of Sanphet I	Suthat (son)
20		Sanphet IV สมเด็จพระสรรเพชญ์ที่ ๔		Si Saowaphak สมเด็จพระศรีเสาวภาคย์	no Queen	Ekathotsarot	born 1585 reigned 1610–1611 1 year death 1611 26 years	Son of Sanphet III	Vacant
Succession crisis of 1611, Japanese rebellion of 1611
21		Borommaracha I the Pious and Just สมเด็จพระบรมราชาที่ ๑	Somdet Phra Phutthachao Yuhua Songtham An Maha Prasert สมเด็จพระพุทธเจ้าอยู่หัวทรงธรรมอันมหาประเสริฐ	Songtham I สมเด็จพระเจ้าทรงธรรมที่ ๑	Queen Chantharacha Queen Khattiyathewi	Songtham	born 1590 reigned 1611–1628 17 years death 1628 38 years	Son of Sanphet III Next in line after the murder of Sanphet IV	Si Sorarak (son)
22		Borommaracha II the young สมเด็จพระบรมราชาที่ ๒		Chetthathirat II สมเด็จพระเชษฐาธิราชที่ ๒	no Queen	Songtham	born 1613 reigned 1628–1629 1 year death 1629 16 years	Son of Borommaracha I	Vacant
23		Athittayawong สมเด็จพระอาทิตยวงศ์			no Queen	Songtham	born 1620 reigned 1629 36 days death 1637 17 years	Son of Borommaracha I Overthrew Borommaracha II, helped by Sanphet V	Vacant

=== Prasat Thong dynasty (1629–1688) ===
No.	Portrait	Regnal name	Ceremonial Name	Personal name	Spouse	House	Life Details	Succession	Viceroy
24		Sanphet V สมเด็จพระสรรเพชญ์ที่ ๕	Somdet Phra Ekathotsarot Isuan Borommanat Borombophit สมเด็จพระเอกาทศรถอิศวรบรมนาถบรมบพิตร	Prasat Thong สมเด็จพระเจ้าปราสาททอง	Supreme Queen none Queen of The Left: Pathumathewi; Suriya; Chanthathewi; Sirikanlaya; Queen of the Right: Ubonthewi; Naphathewi; Onbutri; Kanithathewi	Prasat Thong	born 1599 reigned 1629–1655 26 years death 1655 56 years	Former Defence Minister and Marquess of Ayutthaya Son-in-law of Borommaracha I unclear origins: maternal cousin of Borommaracha I or illegitimate son of Sanphet III Overthrew Athittayawong	Vacant
25		Sanphet VI สมเด็จพระสรรเพชญ์ที่ ๖		Chai สมเด็จเจ้าฟ้าไชย	no Queen	Prasat Thong	born 1630 reigned 1655–1656 1 year death 1656 26 years	Son of Sanphet V	Vacant
26		Sanphet VII สมเด็จพระสรรเพชญ์ที่ ๗		Si Suthammaracha สมเด็จพระศรีสุธรรมราชาธ	no Queen	Suthammaracha	born 1600 reigned 1656 2 months death 1656 56 years	Brother of Sanphet V Overthrew Sanphet VI	Narai (nephew)
27		Ramathibodi III the Great สมเด็จพระรามาธิบดีที่ ๓	Somdet Phra Borommarachathirat Ramathibodi Sisanphet Borommanahachakkraphatdisuan Rachathirat Ramesuanthon Tharathibodi etc. etc. สมเด็จพระบรมราชาธิราชรามาธิบดี ศรีสรรเพชญ์บรมมหาจักรพรรดิศวร ราชาธิราชราเมศวรธรธราธิบดีฯ	Narai the Great สมเด็จพระนารายณ์มหาราช Narintha Kuman พระนรินทกุมาร Surintha Kuman พระสุรินทกุมาร	Supreme Queen Kasattri	Narai	born 1632 reigned 1656–1688 32 years death 1688 56 years	Son of Sanphet V Overthrew Sanphet VII	Vacant

=== Ban Phlu Luang dynasty (1688–1767) ===
No.	Portrait	Regnal name	Ceremonial Name	Personal name	Spouse	House	Life Details	Succession	Viceroy
28		Phetracha the Wise สมเด็จพระเพทราชา	Somdet Phra Mahaburut Wisutthidet Udom สมเด็จพระมหาบุรุษวิสุทธิเดชอุดม	Thadathibet สมเด็จพระธาดาธิเบศร์ Songtham II พระทรงธรรมที่ ๒	Supreme Queen Thephamat Queen of The Left Yothathep Queen of the Right Yothathip	Phetracha	born 1632 reigned 1688–1703 15 years death 1703 71 years	Former Elephant Corps Minister and General Son-in-law, Brother-in-law of Ramathibodi III Overthrew Ramathibodi III	Sorasak (stepson)
29		Sanphet VIII the Tiger King สมเด็จพระสรรเพชญ์ที่ ๘		Suriyenthrathibodi สมเด็จพระเจ้าสุริเยนทราธิบดี Seua พระเจ้าเสือ	Supreme Queen Phanwasa	Phetracha	born 1661 reigned 1703–1709 6 years death 1709 48 years	Adoptive Son of Phetracha Son of Ramathibodi III	Phet (son)
30		Sanphet IX the Fisher สมเด็จพระสรรเพชญ์ที่ ๙ Phra Phuminthara Maha Rachathirat พระภูมินทรมหาราชาธิราช	Somdet Phra Thinang Banyong Rattanat สมเด็จพระที่นั่งบรรยงก์รัตนาสน์	Thai Sa พระเจ้าท้ายสระ	Supreme Queen Rachanurak	Phetracha	born 1679 reigned 1709–1733 24 years death 1733 54 years	Son of Sanphet VIII	Phon (brother)
Succession crisis of 1733
31		Maha Thammarachathirat II the King in the Urn สมเด็จพระมหา ธรรมราชาธิราชที่ ๒ Maha Thammaracha VI พระมหาธรรมราชาที่ ๖	Somdet Phra Triphoploka Makut Udom Borommahitsarawong Suriyen Narentharathibodin Thararodom etc. etc. สมเด็จพระตรีภพโลกมกุฎอุดมบรมมหิศรวรวงศ์สุริเยนทร์ นเรนทราธิบดินทราโรดมฯ	Borommakot สมเด็จพระเจ้าอยู่หัวบรมโกศ Borommaracha พระเจ้าบรมราชา (not given a regnal number)	Supreme Queen Aphainuchit Queen of The Left Inthasuchathewi Queen of the Right Phiphitmontri	Borommakot	born 1681 reigned 1733–1758 25 years death 1758 77 years	Son of Sanphet VIII Succession War, overthrew the heir apparent - Prince Aphai	Senaphithak (son)
31		Maha Thammarachathirat II the King in the Urn สมเด็จพระมหา ธรรมราชาธิราชที่ ๒ Maha Thammaracha VI พระมหาธรรมราชาที่ ๖	Somdet Phra Triphoploka Makut Udom Borommahitsarawong Suriyen Narentharathibodin Thararodom etc. etc. สมเด็จพระตรีภพโลกมกุฎอุดมบรมมหิศรวรวงศ์สุริเยนทร์ นเรนทราธิบดินทราโรดมฯ	Borommakot สมเด็จพระเจ้าอยู่หัวบรมโกศ Borommaracha พระเจ้าบรมราชา (not given a regnal number)	Supreme Queen Aphainuchit Queen of The Left Inthasuchathewi Queen of the Right Phiphitmontri	Borommakot	born 1681 reigned 1733–1758 25 years death 1758 77 years	Son of Sanphet VIII Succession War, overthrew the heir apparent - Prince Aphai	Phonphinit (son)
32		Maha Thammarachathirat III the King in the Temple สมเด็จพระมหาธรรมราชาธิราชที่ ๓	Suraprathummaracha สุรประทุมราชา (name according to the Burmese Chronicle)	Uthumphon สมเด็จพระเจ้าอุทุมพร	no queen	Borommakot	born 1733 reigned 1758 3 months 1759–1760 4 months death 1796 63 years	Son of Maha Thammarachathirat II	Vacant
32		Maha Thammarachathirat III the King in the Temple สมเด็จพระมหาธรรมราชาธิราชที่ ๓	Suraprathummaracha สุรประทุมราชา (name according to the Burmese Chronicle)	Uthumphon สมเด็จพระเจ้าอุทุมพร	no queen	Borommakot	born 1733 reigned 1758 3 months 1759–1760 4 months death 1796 63 years	De facto second reign as co-king, installed by Ayutthayan Nobles	Vacant
32		Maha Thammarachathirat III the King in the Temple สมเด็จพระมหาธรรมราชาธิราชที่ ๓	Suraprathummaracha สุรประทุมราชา (name according to the Burmese Chronicle)	Uthumphon สมเด็จพระเจ้าอุทุมพร	no queen	Borommakot	refused a third de facto reign, taken to Konbaung as hostage until death		Vacant
33		Borommaracha III the Sickly สมเด็จพระบรมราชาที่ ๓	Somdet Phra Thinang Suriyat Amarin สมเด็จพระที่นั่งสุริยาศน์อมรินทร์	Ekkathat สมเด็จพระเจ้าเอกทัศ	Supreme Queen Wimonphat	Borommakot	born 1718 reigned 1758–1767 9 years death 1767 49 years	Son of Maha Thammarachathirat II Overthrew Maha Thammarachathirat III	Vacant
Second Fall of Ayutthaya

== Thonburi Kingdom (1767–1782) ==
=== Thonburi dynasty (1767–1782) ===
No.	Portrait	Regnal name	Ceremonial Name	Personal name	Spouse	House	Life Details	Succession	Viceroy
1		Sanphet X the Great สมเด็จพระสรรเพชญ์ที่ ๑๐ Borommaracha IV the Great สมเด็จพระบรมราชาที่ ๔	Phra Si Sanphet Somdet Borommathammikarat Thirat Ramathibodi etc. etc. พระศรีสรรเพชร สมเด็จบรมธรรมิกราชาธิราช รามาธิบดี ฯ Phrabat Somdet Phra Ekathosarot Isuan (II) Borommanatbophit พระบาทสมเด็จพระเอกาทศรถอิศวร(ที่ ๒)บรมนาถบรมบพิตร ฯ	Taksin the Great สมเด็จพระเจ้าตากสินมหาราช 鄭昭 (Zhèng Zhāo / Dên^{7} Zieu^{1})	Supreme Queen Batboricha Queen of The Left Si Sudarak	Taksin	born 17 April 1734 reigned 1767–1782 15 years death 7 April 1782 48 years	Former Marquess of Tak Son-in-law of Rama I Reunited Ayutthaya, refounding it as Thonburi	Inthraphithak (son)

== Rattanakosin Kingdom (1782–present) ==
=== Chakri dynasty (1782–present) ===
No.	Portrait	Regnal name	Ceremonial Name	Personal name	Spouse	House	Life Details	Coronation	Succession	Viceroy
1	4th child (2nd son) of Thongdi and Daoreung	Ramathibodi IV the Great สมเด็จพระรามาธิบดีที่ ๔ (name originally taken) Phutthayotfa Chulalok พระพุทธยอดฟ้าจุฬาโลก Rama I the Great พระรามที่ ๑ (รัชกาลที่ ๑) (retroactively given)	Phra Bat Somdet Phra Borommarachathirat Ramathibodi Si Sinthra Borommaha Chakkraphat Ratchathipbodin etc. etc. พระบาทสมเด็จพระบรมราชาธิราชรามาธิบดี ศรีสินทรบรมมหาจักรพรรดิราชาธิบดินทร์ฯ Phrabat Somdet Phra Paramoruracha Maha Chakri Boromanat Phra Phutthayotfa Chulalok the Great พระบาทสมเด็จพระปรโมรุราชามหาจักรีบรมนารถ พระพุทธยอดฟ้าจุฬาโลกมหาราช (posthumously by Rama III) Somdet Chao Phraya Maha Kasatseuk สมเด็จเจ้าพระยามหากษัตริย์ศึก	Thong Duang ทองด้วง	Supreme Queen Amarindra	Chakri	born 20 March 1737 reigned 1782–1809 27 years death 7 September 1809 72 years	1st Coronation 10 June 1782 2nd Coronation; 17 June 1785	Former Prime Minister & Grand Duke of Thonburi Father-in-law of Borommaracha IV Descendant of Duke Kosa Pan, grandson of Sanphet III Overthrew Borommaracha IV	Maha Sura Singhanat (brother)
1	4th child (2nd son) of Thongdi and Daoreung	Ramathibodi IV the Great สมเด็จพระรามาธิบดีที่ ๔ (name originally taken) Phutthayotfa Chulalok พระพุทธยอดฟ้าจุฬาโลก Rama I the Great พระรามที่ ๑ (รัชกาลที่ ๑) (retroactively given)	Phra Bat Somdet Phra Borommarachathirat Ramathibodi Si Sinthra Borommaha Chakkraphat Ratchathipbodin etc. etc. พระบาทสมเด็จพระบรมราชาธิราชรามาธิบดี ศรีสินทรบรมมหาจักรพรรดิราชาธิบดินทร์ฯ Phrabat Somdet Phra Paramoruracha Maha Chakri Boromanat Phra Phutthayotfa Chulalok the Great พระบาทสมเด็จพระปรโมรุราชามหาจักรีบรมนารถ พระพุทธยอดฟ้าจุฬาโลกมหาราช (posthumously by Rama III) Somdet Chao Phraya Maha Kasatseuk สมเด็จเจ้าพระยามหากษัตริย์ศึก	Thong Duang ทองด้วง	Supreme Queen Amarindra	Chakri	born 20 March 1737 reigned 1782–1809 27 years death 7 September 1809 72 years	1st Coronation 10 June 1782 2nd Coronation; 17 June 1785	Former Prime Minister & Grand Duke of Thonburi Father-in-law of Borommaracha IV Descendant of Duke Kosa Pan, grandson of Sanphet III Overthrew Borommaracha IV	Itsarasunthon (son)
2	4th child (2nd son) of Rama I and Queen Amarindra	Ramathibodi V สมเด็จพระรามาธิบดีที่ ๕ (name originally taken) Thammikkaracha II พระบาทสมเด็จพระบรมธรรมิกราชาที่ ๒ (alternate name originally taken) Phutthaloetla Naphalai พระพุทธเลิศหล้านภาลัย Rama II พระรามที่ ๒ (รัชกาลที่ ๒) (retroactively given)	Phra Bat Somdet Phra Borom Rachathirat Ramathibodi Sri Sinthra Borom Maha Chakraphat Rachathibodin etc. etc. พระบาทสมเด็จพระบรมราชาธิราชรามาธิบดี ศรีสินทรบรมมหาจักรพรรดิ ราชาธิบดินทร์ฯ Phrabat Somdet Phra Boromratchapongchet Maha Itsarasunthon Phra Phutthaloetla Naphalai พระบาทสมเด็จพระบรมราชพงษเชษฐมเหศวรสุนทร พระพุทธเลิศหล้านภาลัย (posthumously by Rama III)	Chim ฉิม	Supreme Queen Si Suriyendra Supreme Consort Kunthon Thipphayawadi	Chakri	born 24 February 1767 reigned 1809–1824 15 years death 21 July 1824 57 years	Coronation 17 September 1809	Son of Rama I	Maha Senanurak (brother)
3	3rd child (2nd son) of Rama II and 1st child of Consort Sri Sulalai	Ramathibodi VI สมเด็จพระรามาธิบดีที่ ๖ (name originally taken) Chetsadarat พระมหาเจษฎาราชเจ้า (retroactively given by Rama IV) Nangklao พระนั่งเกล้าเจ้าอยู่หัว Rama III พระรามที่ ๓ (รัชกาลที่ ๓) (retroactively given by Rama VI)	Phra Bat Somdet Phra Borommarachathirat Ramathibodi Si Sinthra Borommaha Chakkraphat Ratchathipbodin etc. etc. พระบาทสมเด็จพระบรมราชาธิราชรามาธิบดี ศรีสินทรบรมมหาจักรพรรดิราชาธิบดินทร์ฯ Phrabat Somdet Phra Paramathiworaset Maha Chetsadabodin Phra Nangklao Chao Yu Hua พระบาทสมเด็จพระปรมาธิวรเสรฐมหาเจษฎาบดินทรฯ พระนั่งเกล้าเจ้าอยู่หัว (posthumously by Rama IV) Phra Maha Chetsadarat Chao พระมหาเจษฎาราชเจ้า	Thap ทับ	no Queen	Chakri	born 31 March 1788 reigned 1824–1851 27 years death 2 April 1851 63 years	Coronation 1 August 1824	Minister of Trade and Foreign Affairs; Son of Rama II; Elected by the Council of Nobles	Sakdiphonlasep (uncle)
4	44th child (22nd son) of Rama II and 2nd child of Queen Sri Suriyendra	Ramathibodi VII สมเด็จพระรามาธิบดีที่ ๗ (name originally taken) Chomklao พระจอมเกล้าเจ้าอยู่หัว Rama IV พระรามที่ ๔ (รัชกาลที่ ๔) (retroactively given)	Phrabat Somdet Phra Poramenthra Ramathibodhi Srisindra Maha Mongkut Phra Chomklao Chao Yu Hua พระบาทสมเด็จพระปรเมนทรรามาธิบดีศรีสินทรมหามงกุฎ พระจอมเกล้าเจ้าอยู่หัว Phra Sayam Thewa Maha Makut Witthaya the Great พระสยามเทวมหามกุฏวิทยมหาราช	Mongkut มงกุฎ Yai ใหญ่	Supreme Queen Somanass Waddhanawathy Queen Debsirindra Supreme Consort Phannarai	Mongkut	born 18 October 1804 reigned 1851–1868 17 years death 1 October 1868 64 years	Coronation 15 May 1851	Son of Rama II; Half-brother of Rama III; Elected by the Council of Nobles	Pinklao (brother)
Transformation of a feudal mandala system into an absolute monarchical system
5	9th child (5th son) of Rama IV and 1st child of Queen Debsirindra	Ramathibodi VIII สมเด็จพระรามาธิบดีที่ ๘ (retroactively given) Chulachomklao พระจุลจอมเกล้าเจ้าอยู่หัว Rama V the Great พระรามที่ ๕ (รัชกาลที่ ๕) (retroactively given)	Phrabat Somdet Phra Poraminthra Maha Chulalongkorn Phra Chulachomklao Chao Yu Hua พระบาทสมเด็จพระปรมินทรมหาจุฬาลงกรณ์ฯ พระจุลจอมเกล้าเจ้าอยู่หัว Phra Piya the Great พระปิยมหาราช (his full name is 979 characters long)	Chulalongkorn จุฬาลงกรณ์	Supreme Queen Regent Saovabha Phongsri Supreme Queen Savang Vadhana High Queen Sunanda Kumariratana Queen Sukhumala Marasri	Mongkut	born 20 September 1853 reigned 1868–1910 42 years death 23 October 1910 57 years	1st Coronation 11 November 1868 2nd Coronation; 16 November 1873	Son of Rama IV; Elected by the Council of Nobles (Regency until 1873)	Wichaichan (cousin)
5	9th child (5th son) of Rama IV and 1st child of Queen Debsirindra	Ramathibodi VIII สมเด็จพระรามาธิบดีที่ ๘ (retroactively given) Chulachomklao พระจุลจอมเกล้าเจ้าอยู่หัว Rama V the Great พระรามที่ ๕ (รัชกาลที่ ๕) (retroactively given)	Phrabat Somdet Phra Poraminthra Maha Chulalongkorn Phra Chulachomklao Chao Yu Hua พระบาทสมเด็จพระปรมินทรมหาจุฬาลงกรณ์ฯ พระจุลจอมเกล้าเจ้าอยู่หัว Phra Piya the Great พระปิยมหาราช (his full name is 979 characters long)	Chulalongkorn จุฬาลงกรณ์	Supreme Queen Regent Saovabha Phongsri Supreme Queen Savang Vadhana High Queen Sunanda Kumariratana Queen Sukhumala Marasri	Mongkut	born 20 September 1853 reigned 1868–1910 42 years death 23 October 1910 57 years	1st Coronation 11 November 1868 2nd Coronation; 16 November 1873	Son of Rama IV; Elected by the Council of Nobles (Regency until 1873)	Viceroyalty abolished in 1885 after the Front Palace Crisis Replaced with the title of Crown Prince
6	28th child (11th son) of Rama V and 2nd child of Queen Saovabha Phongsri	Ramathibodi IX สมเด็จพระรามาธิบดีที่ ๙ Mongkutklao พระมงกุฎเกล้าเจ้าอยู่หัว Rama VI พระรามที่ ๖ (รัชกาลที่ ๖) (new regnal name)	Phrabat Somdet Phra Poramenthra Maha Vajiravudh Phra Mongkutklao Chao Yu Hua พระบาทสมเด็จพระปรเมนทรมหาวชิราวุธ พระมงกุฎเกล้าเจ้าอยู่หัว Phrabat Somdet Phra Ramathibodi Sisinthara Maha Vajiravudh Phra Mongkutklao Chao Yu Hua พระบาทสมเด็จพระรามาธิบดีศรีสินทรมหาวชิราวุธ พระมงกุฎเกล้าเจ้าอยู่หัว (name to be used during his lifetime) Phra Maha Thirarat Chao พระมหาธีรราชเจ้า	Vajiravudh วชิราวุธ Toh โต	Supreme Queen Suvadhana	Mongkut	born 1 January 1881 reigned 1910–1925 15 years death 26 November 1925 44 years	1st Coronation 11 November 1910 2nd Coronation; 28 November 1911	Prince of Ayutthaya Sri Dvaravati; Son of Rama V Crown Prince	
7	27th child (31st son) of Rama V and 9th child of Queen Saovabha Phongsri	Pokklao ปกเกล้า Rama VII พระรามที่ ๗ (รัชกาลที่ ๗)	Phrabat Somdet Phra Poramenthra Maha Prajadhipok Phra Pokklao Chao Yu Hua พระบาทสมเด็จพระปรมินทรมหาประชาธิปก พระปกเกล้าเจ้าอยู่หัว	Prajadhipok ประชาธิปก Iad Noi เอียดน้อย	Supreme Queen Rambai Barni	Mongkut	born 8 November 1893 reigned 1925–1935 10 years death 30 May 1941 48 years	Coronation 25 February 1926	Prince of Sukhothai; Son of Rama V Brother of Rama VI; 1924 Palace Law of Succession	
Transformation of an absolute monarchical system into a constitutional monarchical system
8	2nd child (1st son) of Mahidol Adulyadej and Princess Srinagarindra	Atthamaramathibodin พระอัฐมรามาธิบดินทร Rama VIII พระรามที่ ๘ (รัชกาลที่ ๘)	Phrabat Somdet Phra Poramenthra Maha Ananda Mahidol Phra Atthamaramathibodin พระบาทสมเด็จพระปรเมนทรมหาอานันทมหิดล พระอัฐมรามาธิบดินทร	Ananda Mahidol อานันทมหิดล Nanda นันท์	no Queen	Mahidol	born 20 September 1925 reigned 1935–1946 11 years death 9 June 1946 21 years	Coronation 13 August 1946	Grandson of Rama V Nephew of Rama VI and Rama VII; 1924 Palace Law of Succession; Elected by the Cabinet	
9	3rd child (2nd son) of Mahidol Adulyadej and Princess Srinagarindra	Ramathibodi X สมเด็จพระรามาธิบดีที่ ๑๐ Rama IX the Great พระรามที่ ๙ (รัชกาลที่ ๙)	Phrabat Somdet Phra Poraminthra Maha Bhumibol Adulyadej the Great Mahitalathibet Ramathibodi Chakri Naribodin Sayamintharathirat Boromanatbophit พระบาทสมเด็จพระปรมินทรมหาภูมิพลอดุลยเดช มหาราช มหิตลาธิเบศรรามาธิบดี จักรีนฤบดินทร สยามินทราธิราช บรมนาถบพิตร Phra Phatthara the Great พระภัทรมหาราช	Bhumibol Adulyadej ภูมิพลอดุลเดช Lek เล็ก	Supreme Queen Regent Sirikit Kitiyakara	Mahidol	born 5 December 1927 reigned 1946–2016 70 years death 13 October 2016 89 years	Coronation 5 May 1950	Grandson of Rama V Brother of Rama VIII; 1924 Palace Law of Succession; Longest-reigning Thai monarch	
10	2nd child (only son) of Rama IX and Queen Sirikit	Ramathibodi XI สมเด็จพระรามาธิบดีที่ ๑๑ Wachiraklao พระวชิรเกล้าเจ้าอยู่หัว Rama X พระรามที่ ๑๐ (รัชกาลที่ ๑๐)	Phrabat Somdet Phra Poramenthra Ramathibodi Sisinthara Maha Vajiralongkorn Phra Wachiraklao Chao Yu Hua พระบาทสมเด็จพระปรเมนทรรามาธิบดีศรีสินทรมหาวชิราลงกรณ พระวชิรเกล้าเจ้าอยู่หัว	Vajiralongkorn วชิราลงกรณ Chai ชาย	Supreme Queen Suthida Tidjai Supreme Consort Niramon Ounprom	Mahidol	born 28 July 1952 reigned from 13 October 2016 Incumbent	Coronation 4 May 2019	Son of Rama IX; Crown Prince	

== Timeline of monarchs ==
*This timeline follows the 5 official kingdoms of Thailand, Siam Confederation, Sukhothai-Si Satchalai City-state, and 2 supplemental monarchs from the Suphannaphum kingdom.

== See also ==
- Family tree of Thai monarchs
- Monarchy of Thailand
- List of rulers of Lan Na
- List of Thai royal consorts
- Rama (Kings of Thailand)
- Chakri dynasty
- Regent of Thailand
- Thailand

== Bibliography ==
- Prince Chula Chakrabongse, HRH (1967). Lords of Life: A History of the Kings of Thailand. United Kingdom: Alvin Redman Limited.
- Prince Damrong Rajanubhab, Disuankumaan (2001). Our Wars With The Burmese: Thai-Burmese Conflict 1539-1767. Thailand: White Lotus Co. Ltd. ISBN 974-7534-58-4.
- Princess Maha Chakri Sirindhorn Foundation (2011). Directory of Thai kings (Thai: นามานุกรมพระมหากษัตริย์ไทย) (PDF). Thailand: www.nanmeebooks.com. ISBN 978-616-7308-25-8. Archived from the original (PDF) on 4 March 2012.
- Royal Institute of Thailand (2002). "Chronology of the Kings of Ayutthaya". Archived from the original on 3 December 2013.
- Wood, William A. R. (1924). History of Siam. Thailand: Chalermit Press. ISBN 1-931541-10-8.
