= Phrip Phri =

12th–14th century political entity in western central Thailand

Phrip Phri Kingdom อาณาจักรพริบพรี (Thai) Anachak Phrip Phri
- 1157/58 or 1188 – 1351
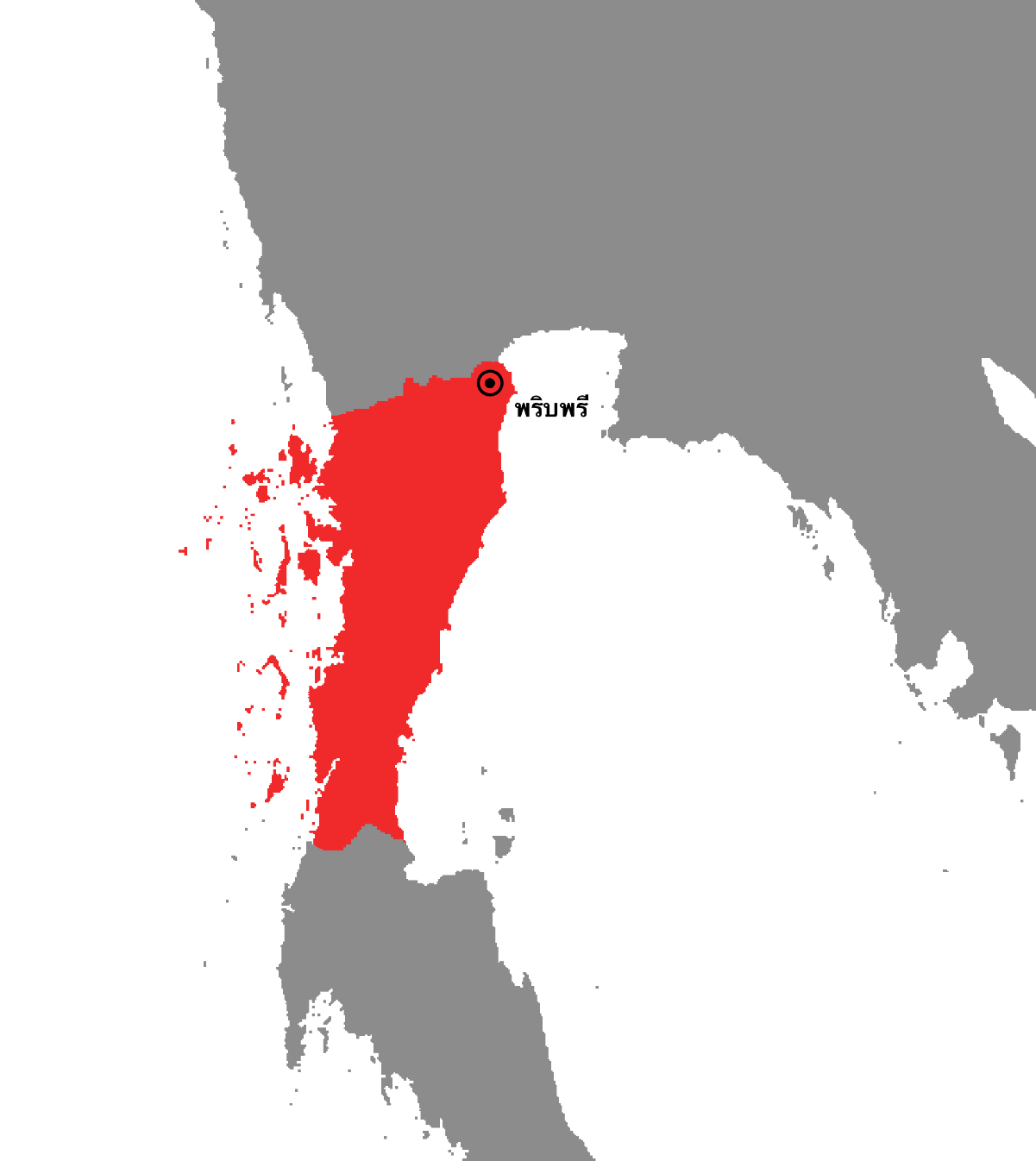
- Phrip Phri Kingdom in 1196

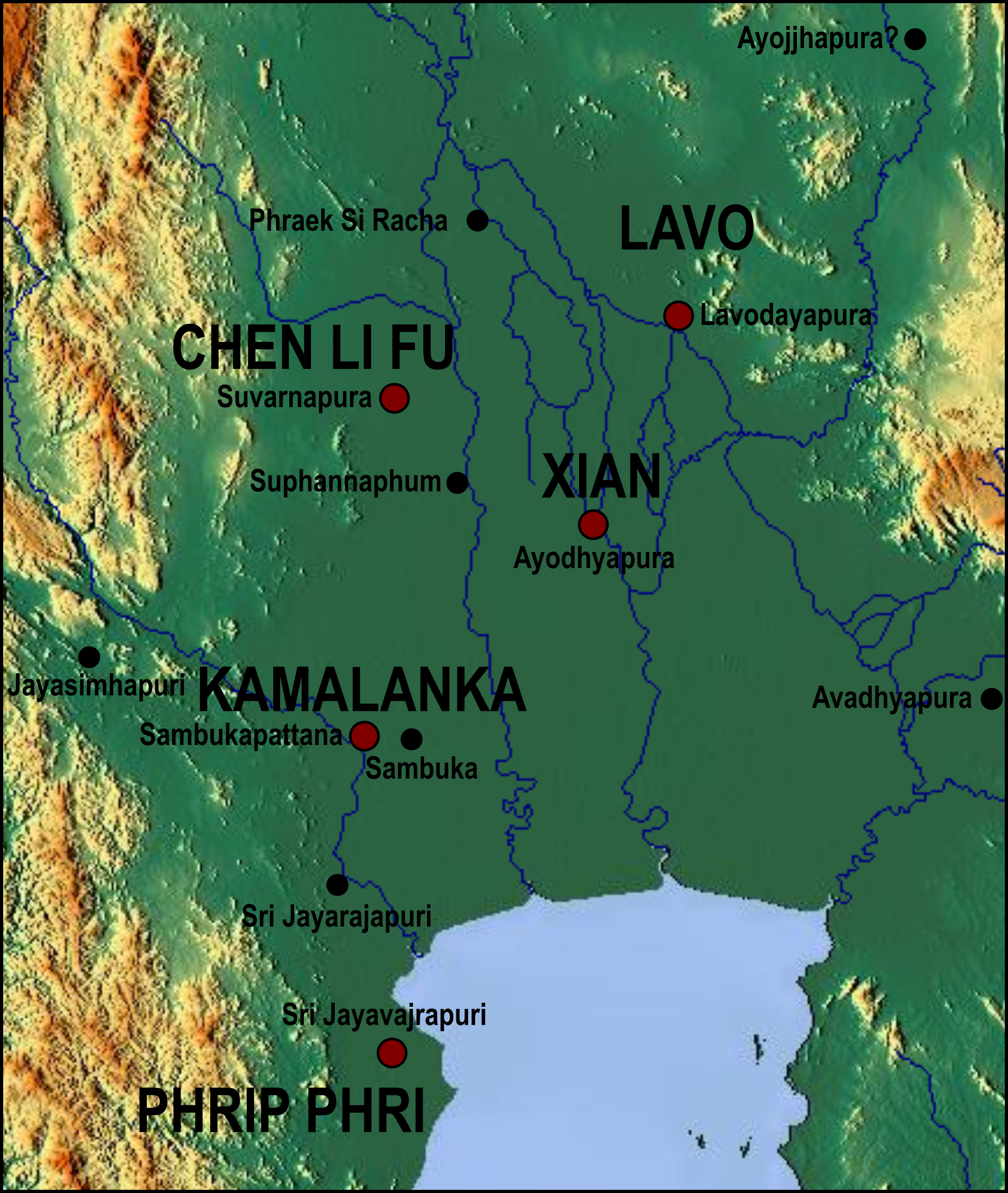
- Lower Menam Valley in the 13th century
- Capital: Phetchaburi
- Monarch
  - 1188–1205 (first): Pra Poa Noome Thele Seri
  - 1342–1351 (last): Uthong V
- Historical era: Post-classical era
  - Establishment: 1157/58 or 1188
  - Territorial dispute with Tambralinga: 1196
  - Annexed Chen Li Fu: 1204
  - Tributary of Sukhothai: 1283–1298
  - Sent tribute to China: 1295
  - Phetchaburi revived Tambralinga: 1342
  - Annexed to Ayutthaya: 1351
Preceded by
Lavo
Chen Li Fu
Kamalanka
Succeeded by
Ayutthaya Kingdom
- Today part of: Thailand; Myanmar

Phrip Phri (Thai: พริบพรี), later known as Phetchaburi, was a Xiān polity on the west coast of the Bay of Bangkok in lower central Thailand. In the Dvaravati period the site was a port on the sea route between India and China, and rulers of the Padumasuriyavaṃśa line are recorded there from the late 10th century before the seat was moved elsewhere. It was re-established in the 12th century by a ruler of the same line who came south from the Sukhothai–Nakhon Thai region.

Over roughly a century and a half the polity extended its reach north to Phraek Si Racha and south into Tambralinga, sent embassies to the Yuan dynasty, and passed by inheritance and marriage to Uthong V, under whom it was absorbed into the Ayutthaya Kingdom in 1351. Whether it was politically independent of Angkor in the interval is disputed.

== Name ==
The city appears under several names. Phrip Phri is the Thai form; the Sanskrit Srijayavajrapuri, from Jaya + Vajra + purī, is the name used in the Preah Khan inscription of Jayavarman VII. Chinese records of the 1290s call the place Pi-ch'a-pu-li.

Its founder is likewise known by several styles: Pprappanom Tteleiseri in the 1684 Instructions Given to the Siamese Envoys Sent to Portugal, Pra Poa Noome Thele Seri (พระพนมไชยศิริ) in Du Royaume de Siam, and Mahesvastidrādhirājakṣatriya in the Nakhon Si Thammarat Chronicle. David K. Wyatt reports a ruler of Phetburi under the style Śrī Maheśvastidṛḍhirājākṣatriya in a year he reads as 1204, who entered trade relations with China and sent troops and colonists north to Chainat and south; he notes that the name is not that of O. W. Wolters's and Cœdès's Mahīdharavarman but is close enough to be of interest. Phetchaburi also lay on the overland route by which monks travelled between the Sukhothai country and Sri Lanka.

== History ==
=== Early settlements ===
Caves and rock shelters in and around Phetchaburi have yielded evidence of settlement in the prehistoric era such as Ban Nong Fab in the west of Tha Yang district and Tham Fa Tho in Mueang district, Ratchaburi. Several settlements dating to the Metal Age in the late prehistoric period have been found on the plains and along the coast. Iron Age sites include Ban Khok Phrik, on a large hummock along the coast in Khung Krathin subdistrict, Mueang district, Ratchaburi, whose inhabitants practised burial rites, were linked to regional mineral sites, and traded by sea over long distances. Trade with distant communities from the late Metal Age onwards contributed to the growth of larger settlements on the fertile alluvial plains.

Sites and artefacts of the Dvaravati period, among them Buddha images and Wheels of the Law, are distributed across the area. In Ban Lat district, traces of buildings and stone statues were recovered at Ban Nong Phra, and earthenware, moulds for Buddha statues and glass beads at Noen Pho Yai; further traces were found near Khao Krajiew in Tha Yang district, and the ruins of a large religious building at Thung Setthi, Cha-am district. The Bangkok Post, surveying the province's antiquities, reports that no Dvaravati-style community has been found in the Phetchaburi River basin itself. Karen Mudar's survey of the moated settlements of the central plain nonetheless includes one she records as Petburi, enclosing 161 ha. It is the largest site in her sample that is not a regional centre, and it marks the southern limit of the distribution. She identified the moated sites as Dvaravati from moat shape and surface material rather than from excavation. Walailak Songsiri treats Phetchaburi and Ratchaburi alike as later towns grown out of earlier centres nearby, Ratchaburi out of the moated town of Khu Bua and Phetchaburi out of the coastal site at Khao Chao Lai on the Cha-am shore.

Some of this material was made locally rather than brought in. Stone workshops of the period have been excavated in the province, and the three stone dharmacakra recovered at U Thong, among them the pillar found near monument No. 11, were probably produced at such workshops, though Robert L. Brown has questioned the reconstruction of the style's emergence on which that account rests. Phetchaburi is also among the centres with which the West Asian merchants of the Phanom Surin ship, wrecked in the Tha Chin delta in the late eighth or early ninth century, are thought to have traded.

Baker and Pasuk count some forty moated towns across the Chao Phraya plain between the 6th and 12th centuries, most of them beside rivers. They shared religious practice, art styles and the use of Mon for inscriptions, but on their reading show no sign of political integration beyond, perhaps, local confederations.

=== Foundation ===
The chronicle tradition credits Pra Poa Noome Thele Seri with founding the city in the 12th century, but the place is attested earlier. A ruler named Dhalemesvara (เทลเมศวร) is placed at Phetchaburi in the 9th century, contemporary with Phraya Kong of Nakhon Pathom, and the Legend of Phraya Kong – Phraya Pan records that Phraya Kong married a princess of his line. The Ayutthaya Testimonies then name Vijayaraja and his son Srisimha as rulers of Phetchaburi in the late 10th and 11th centuries, Vijayaraja being described as its refounder and Srisimha as having afterwards left it to rule from Phraek Si Racha; both are of the line that traced its descent from Padumasuriyavaṃśa, the same line from which Pra Poa Noome Thele Seri came. What the sources describe is therefore a seat that moved between cities, not a single act of foundation.

The seat from which the founder's other line of descent is traced, Yassouttora Nacoora Louang or Tasoo Nacora Louang (ธาตุนครหลวง) in Du Royaume de Siam, is itself unidentified. Three candidates have been proposed. They are Yaśodharapura, (Note: If Yassouttora Nacoora Louang is identified as Yaśodharapura, the new capital was established circa the 890s.) Lavo's Lavapura, (Note: If Yassouttora Nacoora Louang is identified as Lavo's Lavapura.) and, on phonetic grounds, the village of Tha Sao (บ้านท่าเสา) near modern Uttaradit, reading Tasoo as Tha Sao and Nacoora Louang as "royal city", an area in which several archaeological sites lie, most notably the ruins at Thung Yang.

The Instructions, the Voyage de Siam of Guy Tachard and Du Royaume de Siam give the following sequence of capitals for the dynasty.

Capital	Years	Kings	Notes/Contemporary events
Tchai pappe Mahanacon (Phraek Si Racha)	756/57–890s? or 980s	Pra Poat honne Sourittep pennaratui sonanne bopitra	The first king
Tchai pappe Mahanacon (Phraek Si Racha)	756/57–890s? or 980s	Other 8–9 kings. Full list at Xiān	
Tchai pappe Mahanacon (Phraek Si Racha)	756/57–890s? or 980s	Ipoia Sanne Thora Thesma Teperat	Fall of Rāmaññadesa (Si Thep/Ayojjhapura?) (946); Moved the capital to Yassouttora Nacoora Louang
Yassouttora Nacoora Louang/ Tasoo Nacora Louang (Lavo or Yaśodharapura or Tha Sao)	890s? or 980s?–1155	Ipoia Sanne Thora Thesma Teperat	Foundation of Yaśodharapura (890s)
Yassouttora Nacoora Louang/ Tasoo Nacora Louang (Lavo or Yaśodharapura or Tha Sao)	890s? or 980s?–1155	Other 11–12 kings. Full list at Lavo Kingdom	Collapsing era of Dvaravati (10th–11th centuries)
Yassouttora Nacoora Louang/ Tasoo Nacora Louang (Lavo or Yaśodharapura or Tha Sao)	890s? or 980s?–1155	Pra Poa Noome Thele Seri/ Pprappanom Tteleiseri	The period of weak rule and feuding began in Yaśodharapura in 1150.; Yaśodharapura fell under the Chinese King (1167–1177).; Yaśodharapura fell under Champa (1178–1181).; Lavo became independent. (1150s); Pra Poa Noome Thele Seri ordered the people to move to Soucouttae/Locontàï (1155).; Rivalry between the Tai mueang and Lavo over Sukhothai and Mueang Chaliang (1150s–1230s).; Pra Poa Noome Thele Seri moved south with about 54,000 followers and established Phrip Phri (1157 or 1188).
Soucouttae/Locontàï (Sukhothai/Nakhon Thai)	1155–1169	Pra Poa Noome Thele Seri/ Pprappanom Tteleiseri	The period of weak rule and feuding began in Yaśodharapura in 1150.; Yaśodharapura fell under the Chinese King (1167–1177).; Yaśodharapura fell under Champa (1178–1181).; Lavo became independent. (1150s); Pra Poa Noome Thele Seri ordered the people to move to Soucouttae/Locontàï (1155).; Rivalry between the Tai mueang and Lavo over Sukhothai and Mueang Chaliang (1150s–1230s).; Pra Poa Noome Thele Seri moved south with about 54,000 followers and established Phrip Phri (1157 or 1188).
Phrip Phri (Phetchaburi)	1188–1205	Pra Poa Noome Thele Seri/ Pprappanom Tteleiseri	The period of weak rule and feuding began in Yaśodharapura in 1150.; Yaśodharapura fell under the Chinese King (1167–1177).; Yaśodharapura fell under Champa (1178–1181).; Lavo became independent. (1150s); Pra Poa Noome Thele Seri ordered the people to move to Soucouttae/Locontàï (1155).; Rivalry between the Tai mueang and Lavo over Sukhothai and Mueang Chaliang (1150s–1230s).; Pra Poa Noome Thele Seri moved south with about 54,000 followers and established Phrip Phri (1157 or 1188).
Phrip Phri (Phetchaburi)	1205–1342	Other 2 kings	Phrip Phri – China royal intermarriages established.
Phrip Phri (Phetchaburi)	1342–1351	Uthong V	Traditional establishment of the Ayutthaya Kingdom (1351); Also King of Suphannabhum (r. 1341–1351)
Ayodhya (Ayutthaya)	1351–1369	Uthong V	Traditional establishment of the Ayutthaya Kingdom (1351); Also King of Suphannabhum (r. 1341–1351)
Ayodhya (Ayutthaya)	1369–1767	Other 32–34 kings	

=== Date of the refoundation ===
The sources place the 12th-century re-establishment in two different years, and the events recorded in between belong to neither. The 1684 Instructions state that Phrip Phri was built in 1157/58 by a king who came from Soucouttae (Sukhothai), moving south with some 54,000 followers, whereas Du Royaume de Siam has the same figure, there ruling at Locontàï (Nakhon Thai), ascend the throne in 1188 and found the city then. Between those two dates the chronicle traditions record him and his brother taking a succession of towns down the valley: Uthong I came to the vacant throne of Suphannabhum in 1163, Pra Poa Noome Thele Seri succeeded a kinsman at Jayasimhapuri about 1169, and he regained Phraek Si Racha in 1180. His line had held that seat before, under Srisimha. A territorial dispute with Tambralinga followed in 1196.

The material evidence does not settle the year either. The base of the main stupa at Wat Maha That is of large bricks in the Dvaravati art style, the pagoda is in the Ayutthaya style, and several temples hold large red sandstone Buddha images in the pre-Ayutthayan U Thong Style. On the newspaper's reading the town was therefore founded before the Ayutthaya period, possibly when Buddhism reached it from Ceylon by way of Nakhon Si Thammarat.

A separate dispute over the founder's ancestry turns on how an era name is read. Manit Vallipodom's interpretation of 1973 equated the Tertiary Era of the Legend of Singhanavati with the Chula Sakarat era, which placed the later monarchs of the Singhanavati dynasty, Chaiyasiri among them, in the 10th century. Since the legend has Chaiyasiri move south into the Chao Phraya valley, earlier Thai scholars identified him with Phanom Thale Sri of the Phetchaburi line, and so made him the founder of Phrip Phri. That reading no longer holds. Phiset Chiachanphong argued that the Tertiary Era should instead be read as the Shaka era, which places Chaiyasiri in the 5th century, some seven centuries before the foundation of Phrip Phri.

=== Expansion and relations with Tambralinga ===
The Nakhon Si Thammarat chronicle describes the arrival itself. It relates that Phra Phanom Thale Si Mahesvastidrādhirājakṣatriya came with 33,000 men, 500 elephants and 700 horses, followed by some 55,000 more, and established a royal residence at Phetchaburi with a forecourt and quarters for the palace women; that he set the people to making salt and had it presented to his grandparents; and that he opened 300 fields at Bang Taphan on the coast.

The Nakhon Si Thammarat chronicle records that King Mahesvastidrādhirājakṣatriya of Phrip Phri extended his territory north to Phraek Si Racha, in present-day Chai Nat, late in the 12th century, and sent his preceptor to govern it; the area he took in also covers the region proposed for Chen Li Fu. To the south, a territorial dispute with Tambralinga in 1196 was settled by negotiation rather than conquest, and produced a lasting dynastic tie. In the early 14th century princes of Phetchaburi revived Tambralinga after its collapse under the Singhasari invasion and an outbreak of plague.

=== Angkorian influence ===
Phrip Phri is named, as Srijayavajrapuri, among several cities of west-central Thailand in the Preah Khan inscription of Jayavarman VII, (Note: The name occurs at verses 116 to 117a of the inscription (K. 908), in a string of six cities: Lavodayapura, Svarṇapura, Śamvūkapaṭṭana, Jayarājapurī, Śrī Jayasiṃhapurī and Śrī Jayavajrapurī, generally read as Lopburi, Suphan Buri, an unidentified place, Ratchaburi, Sing Buri and Phetchaburi. Śamvūkapaṭṭana is the only one of the six that has not been identified. Baker and Pasuk give the third name as Sambūkapura and place it tentatively at Ban Pong, and read the fifth, Jaya-Simhapuri, as Mueang Sing rather than Sing Buri; they count the six among twenty-five cities to which the image was sent. Cœdès, publishing the inscription, named the recipients in present-day Thailand as Lopburi, Suphan Buri, Ratchaburi, Phetchaburi and Mueang Sing, and the ancient site of Sa Kosi Narai in Ratchaburi is signposted as Śamvūkapaṭṭana on the proposal of some scholars. The Ban Pong placement has a chain behind it. Cœdès, noting the name Cāmbūka on a Dvaravati-style Buddha recovered at Lopburi, went no further than the Menam valley; Phōngsi Wanasin and Thiwa Supcanya located it at Ban Pong under code no. 10.2 of their survey, following M. C. Subhadradis Diskul, who in 1966 quoted Tri Amatyakul's proposal without endorsing it and printed a plan of the supposed site.) but the text records no exercise of political authority over them. Architecture in the Bayon style, which belongs to Jayavarman VII's reign, is nonetheless present, notably the shrine at Wat Kamphaeng Laeng. Songsiri qualifies both points. She places the arrival of Angkorian religious forms in the western basin in the second half of the 13th century, after Jayavarman VII's reign. She also reports excavation at the Phetchaburi city wall as having recovered sherds of only three kinds, from the Pa Yang and Ko Noi kilns at Si Satchanalai, from the Bang Pun kilns at Suphan Buri, and from Fujian kilns of the Yuan period, with no Song ware among them.

The titulature bears on the same question and has been read in opposite senses. The ruler recorded by the Chinese bore the style Gan-mu-ding, a Khmer title, which has been taken to mean that Phrip Phri was not fully independent in this period. Ishii, reporting the same record, gives 敢木丁 as the king's name rather than as a title. The same style appears at Chen Li Fu, and in an inscription of 1183 at Chaiya, where a ruler is named Kamrateng An Maharaja Sri Mat Trailokyaraja Mauli Bhusanavarmadeva; Chit Phumisak read it there as the designation of a dependent governor. Several chronicles and legends likewise show dynastic relations between Phrip Phri and Lavo's Ayodhya, ruled by the Lavo or Uthong dynasty, which was in closer contact with Angkor than other parts of Siam proper and may have taken up Angkorian norms of titling its local rulers.

Against this, the Chinese texts themselves call the place chéng (城), "city" or "city-state", and not guó (國, "country"), and the same Khmer-derived style was borne in 1295, during a period of Angkorian weakness. Songsiri reads the style differently again. On her account the Khmer title and the Indic royal name were both taken up from the Khorat plateau and the Tonle Sap for formal address to the Chinese court, and the Chinese records give kamrateng for the rulers of Sukhothai, Phetchaburi and Chen Li Fu alike. The sixty and more settlements dependent on Chen Li Fu had rulers of their own, and none of them bore it.

=== Relations with China ===
The chronicle tradition places trade with China at the beginning of the polity's history. A Chinese junk is said to have called soon after the founder's arrival, and the king to have granted the sappanwood its crew requested until the vessel was full; in return the emperor is said to have given him Princess Chandradevi Sri Bat Rajaputri Sri Thong Samut (จันทรเทวีศรีบาทราชบุตรีศรีทองสมุทร) as his queen. The chronicle and Chit Phumisak give her parentage differently. The Nakhon Si Thammarat chronicle makes her a daughter of the Chinese emperor by a Cham queen, while Chit Phumisak makes her a granddaughter of a princess of Champa who had become an imperial consort. The line continued to rule Ayodhya until its descendant Uthong V united the polities of the lower Chao Phraya River valley; Uthong V is himself said to have married a Chinese princess named Pacham Thong.

In 1293 the Chinese court sent emissaries to press Xiān to submit and was refused, and a further summons followed in 1294; in 1295 the king of Xiān appeared at court in person with tribute and a golden plate. G. H. Luce identified that ruler as the king of Pi-ch'a-pu-li. Chit Phumisak dated the embassy to July 1294 and read the envoy's name in the Chinese record as a transliteration of the Khmer rank kamrateng (กัมรเตงอัญ). He noted that the court summoned the kamrateng of Xiān separately a month later, treating the two as distinct rulers. Chris Baker and Pasuk Phongpaichit count the two missions separately, giving Phetchaburi one mission in 1294 and attributing the golden plate of 1295 to the ruler of Xiān, without equating the two rulers.

=== Absorption into Ayutthaya ===
The Instructions, the Ayutthaya Chronicle of Jeremias van Vliet and Du Royaume de Siam agree that the first king of the Ayutthaya Kingdom, Uthong V, had earlier been king of Phrip Phri, which the same dynasty had held for four generations. While reigning there he married the only Suphannaphum princess, which made him king of Suphannaphum as well; when he was offered the throne of Lavo's Ayodhya in 1351, the four polities he then held, Suphannaphum, Phrip Phri, Lavo and Ayodhya, were de facto united, and that union is conventionally taken as the formation of the Ayutthaya Kingdom. Baker and Pasuk describe the same four as towns of the lower plain that had each sent missions to China in its own name, Ayodhya as Xian, Lavo as Luohu, Suphan Buri as Sumenbang and Phetchaburi as Pichaburi.

Uthong V's own origins are unsettled. Baker and Pasuk count at least seven legends about him, among them one making him a ruler of one of the gulf cities, Phetchaburi, Suphan Buri or Lopburi, and Van Vliet's, which makes him a Chinese merchant who settled at Phetchaburi before moving north to found Ayutthaya.

Phrip Phri was thereafter dissolved and its towns placed directly under Ayutthaya. Both Phetchaburi and Ratchaburi kept functions under the new kingdom. Ratchaburi served as a frontier town against Burmese invasion, and the main sanctuary of Wat Mahathat Worawihan there shows a relation to Ayutthaya art. Phetchaburi linked the towns of the Chao Phraya basin to those of the southern coast and served as a port where merchant vessels anchored before sailing on to the capital or further south. Both kept these roles into the Rattanakosin period.

== Genealogy ==
The chart below shows the connections between the Chinese imperial house and the local dynasties of the lower Chao Phraya valley, together with the two competing theories of the origin of Uthong II, king of Lavo's Ayodhya from 1205 to 1253.

Chronicles-based theory	Alternative theory
From Phraek Si Racha?/Lavo?	Phrom; King of Chiang Saen	□ Si Satchanalai princess
From Soucouttae/ Locontàï/ Si Satchanalai	Kesariraja; 9th King of Si Satchanalai; King of Lavo's Lavapura	Phra Chao Luang; 2nd King of Lavo's Ayodhya
□ Chinese Emperor	Chandramouli; Champa princess	Chaiyasiri; King of Nakhon Thai	Sai Nam Peung; 3rd King of Lavo's Ayodhya	Dara Ratchathewi; Ayodhya princess
Pprappanom Tteleiseri; King of Phrip Phri	Chandradevi; Chinese princess	Soi La/Uthong I King of Suphannabhum	Pprappanom Tteleiseri; King of Phrip Phri	Soi La/Uthong I King of Suphannabhum	Dhammikaraja; 4th King of Lavo's Ayodhya
Uthong II; 5th King of Lavo's Ayodhya	□ Suphannabhum princess	Phanom Wang; King of Ligor	□ Suphannabhum princess	Uthong II; 5th King of Lavo's Ayodhya
Thonglanrach; 2nd King of Phrip Phri
Phanom Wang; King of Ligor	Ai; King of Ligor	Yi; King of Tanintharyi	Sam; King of Phrip Phri	Thonglanrach; 2nd King of Phrip Phri
Chaithat; Prince of Phichai Chiangmai/ Mueang Rad?	□ Princess	Jayasena; 6th King of Lavo's Ayodhya; Ruler of Phichai Chiangmai/ Mueang Rad?
Saen Pom; Ruler of Suphannaphum	□ Princess of Kamphaeng Phet	Suvarnaraja; 7th King of Lavo's Ayodhya	Dhammatrilokthi; 12th King of Si Satchanalai
Uthong III; King of Suphannabhum	Kalaya Devi	Dhammaraja; 8th King of Lavo's Ayodhya
Uthong IV; King of Suphannabhum	Sunantha Devi	Baramaraja; 9th King of Lavo's Ayodhya
Pha Ngua; King of Suphannabhum; 3rd King of Ayutthaya	□ Sukhothai princess	□ Suphannabhum princess	Uthong V 5th King of Phrip Phri; King of Suphannabhum; 1st King of Ayutthaya	Pacham Thong; Chinese princess
Suphannabhum dynasty of Ayutthaya	Lavo dynasty of Ayutthaya

== Rulers ==
Rulers		Reign	Notes/Contemporary events
Romanized name	Thai name	Reign	Notes/Contemporary events
Dhalemesvara	เทลเมศวร	9th century	Contemporary of Phraya Kong of Nakhon Pathom (r. 807–867), whose marriage to a princess of Dhalemesvara is recorded in the Legend of Phraya Kong – Phraya Pan
The Menam valley was conquered by Tambralinga in 927. Kamalanka was attacked by the Chola in 1030, and later destroyed by the Pagan in 1058. After that, several kingdoms emerged in the western valley, such as Chen Li Fu (12th century–1204), Suphannabhum (12th century–1438), Phrip Phri (1157/58 or 1188–1351), all of which later became part of the Ayutthaya Kingdom of Xiān.
Vijayaraja	พิชัยราชา	987–1027	Founded Phra Nakhon Phichai Buri (พระนครพิชัยบุรี), generally identified with Phetchaburi, as his principal seat; Succeeded his elder brother Visnuraja at Phitsanulok before moving his seat south
Srisimha	ศรีสิงห์	1027–1062	Son of the previous; Later left the throne at Phetchaburi and returned to rule from Phraek Si Racha.
No ruler recorded; the seat lay elsewhere		1062–1188	Potentially under the control of Si Dharmasokaraja line of Tambralinga
Pprappanom Tteleiseri (Note: The 1684 Instructions Given to the Siamese Envoys Sent to Portugal gives Phrip Phri only four kings, so Pprappanom Tteleiseri, Pra Poa Noome Thele Seri, Mahesvastidrādhirājakṣatriya and Phichaithep Chiang Saen may be one person.); Phanom Chaisiri; Pra Poa Noome Thele Seri; Mahesvastidrādhirājakṣatriya; Phichaithep Chiang Saen	พนมทะเลศรี; พิชัยเทพเชียงแสน; พนมไชยศิริ	1188 – 1205	Refounder of Phetchaburi; Also king of Sukhothai; Said in legend to be the elder brother of Soi La, or Uthong I, king of Suphannabhum (r. 1163–1205); Possibly a grandson of a king of Lavo.; Father of King Uthong II of Lavo's Ayodhya. (Note: Some source says Uthong II was a son of Lavo's Ayodhya king, Dhammikaraja (r. 1165–1205).); Territorial dispute with Tambralinga, 1196.; Regained Phraek Si Racha (Chen Li Fu) in 1180.
Thonglanrach (Note: The chronicle names Thonglanrach and Jayasena as rulers of Sukandhakiree (สุคันธคีรี), which Borihan Thepthani identified with Phetchaburi. Sukandhakiree is elsewhere the northern polity of Phichai Chiang Mai, to which Jayasena withdrew on giving up Ayodhya in 1289 and where he succeeded his own father.)	ทองลันราช	1205–?	Son of the previous. Older brother of Uthong II
Sam	เจ้าสาม	Before 1253–?	Son of Uthong II of Lavo's Ayodhya and nephew of the previous. Appointed to Phrip Phri by his father, whose reign ended in 1253.
Uthong V (Note: Later King of Ayutthaya (1351–1369).) or Worachet	อู่ทอง/ วรเชษฐ์	1342–1351	Great-grandson of Jayasena.; Also King of Suphannabhum; Later King of the Ayutthaya Kingdom.
After the traditional formation of the Ayutthaya Kingdom in 1351, rulers of Phetchaburi were appointed by the King of Ayutthaya.
