= Thung Yang =

Thung Yang ทุ่งยั้ง
- Tambon
- Country: Thailand
- Province: Uttaradit
- District: Laplae District

Population (2005)
  - Total: 11,121
- Time zone: UTC+7 (ICT)

Thung Yang (Thai: ทุ่งยั้ง, pronounced [tʰûŋ jáŋ]) is a village and tambon (sub-district) of Laplae District, Uttaradit Province, Thailand. In 2005 it had a population of 11,121 people. The tambon contains ten villages.
