= Wat Kamphaeng Laeng =

Khmer Buddhist temple

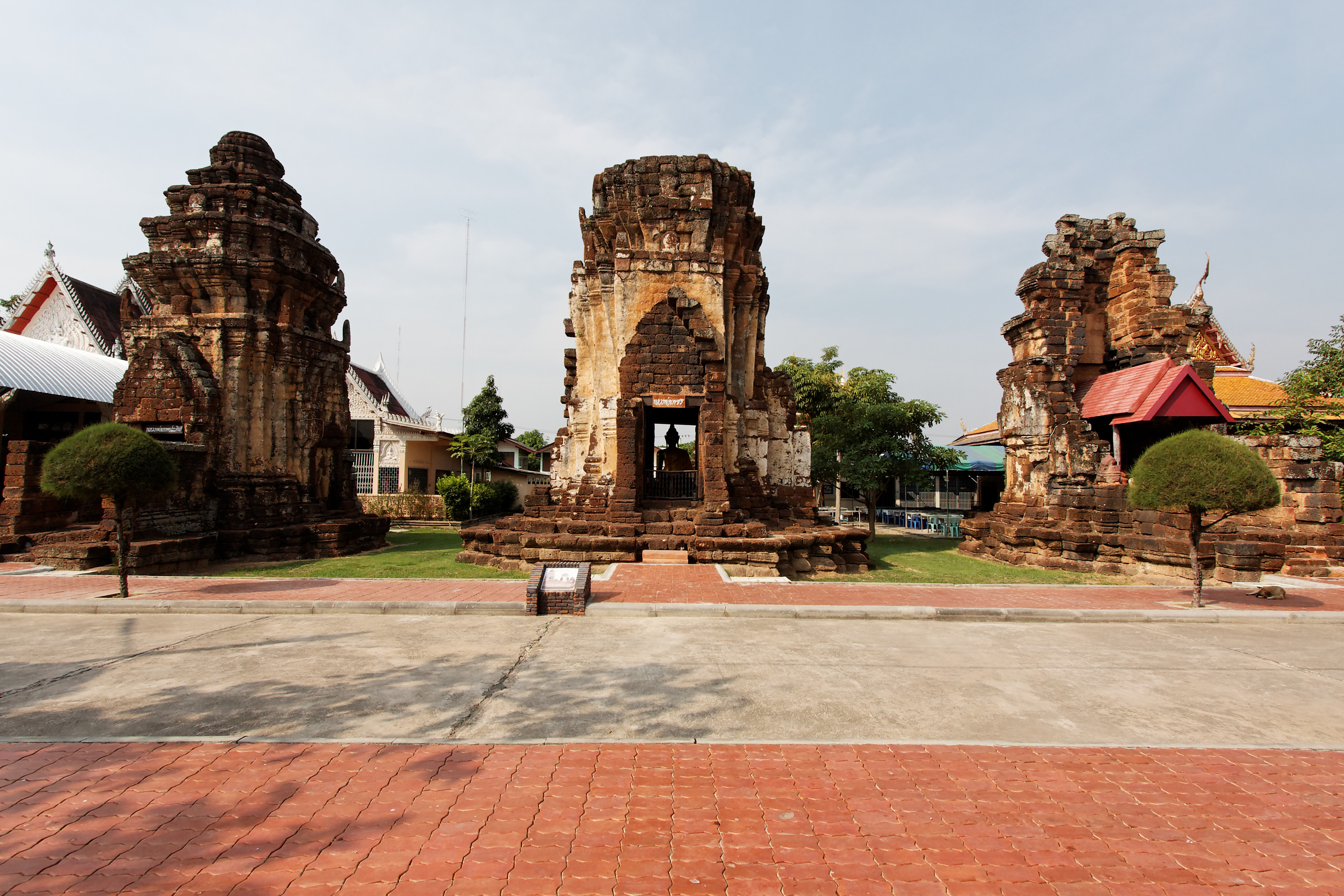

Religion
- Affiliation: Buddhism
- District: Mueang Phetchaburi district
- Province: Phetchaburi province

Location
- Country: Thailand
- Interactive map of Wat Kamphaeng Laeng
- Coordinates: 13°6′19.39″N 99°57′20.83″E

Architecture
- Creator: Jayavarman VII
- Completed: 13th century

Wat Kamphaeng Laeng is a Buddhist temple in Mueang Phetchaburi district, Phetchaburi province, Thailand. It was originally built as an ancient Khmer Hindu temple in the 13th century during the reign of Jayavarman VII, and was later converted into a Buddhist temple.

== Description ==
Built between 1200 and 1250 during the reign of Jayavarman VII in the Khmer Bayon and Lopburi styles, the temple now stands in the grounds of a modern Buddhist temple.

Originally surrounded by a laterite wall, the complex consists of five structures - four towers, each on a stepped base, and a shrine in a cross-shaped plan. Facing east as usual, three of the towers are situated at the front and the fourth, of which little remains, at the back. The main shrine overlooks a small artificial pond. All the structures are of laterite and would have been covered with stucco of which some fragments remain.

== Discovery of artefact ==
In 1956, a statue of Shiva's consort Uma was discovered in one of the towers.
