= Surindraraja =

Legendary ruler mentioned in the Ayutthaya Testimonies

Ruler of Chai Nat Buri
- Predecessor: Srisimha
- Successor: Suryavamsa
- Spouse: Candradevi
- Father: Srisimha

Surindraraja (Thai: สุรินทราชา) was a ruler mentioned in the Ayutthaya Testimonies. According to the chronicle, he was the son of King Srisimha and became ruler of Sawankhaburi after his father's death. His queen was Candradevi.

According to the chronicle, an astrologer warned Surindraraja that he would die from poison. He then moved to a new location and built a city named Chai Nat Buri. He was also known as King Chai Nat after the city.

The chronicle states that Surindraraja ruled for 38 years and died at the age of 53. He had no sons and was succeeded by his younger half-brother Suryavamsa.
