= Candraraja =

King of Kamphaeng Phet–Sukhothai

Candraraja จันทราชา
- King of Kamphaeng Phet–Sukhothai

King of Kamphaeng Phet
- Reign: 1184–1188/89
- Predecessor: Suryaraja
- Successor: Seat shifted to Sukhothai

King of Sukhothai
- Reign: 1188/89–1214
- Predecessor: Pra Poa Noome Thele Seri
- Successor: E Daeng Phloeng (Note: Chit Phumisak read the name as that of an elephant rather than of a ruler, on which reading no ruler so named held Sukhothai.)
- Born: 1154; Kamphaeng Phet
- Died: 1214 (aged 59–60); Sukhothai
- Consort: Nang Nak; Sūryadevī
- Issue: Si Inthrathit (Phra Ruang IV) of Sukhothai; Phra Ruang V Suvaṇṇadevī
- House: Phra Ruang
- Father: Suryaraja of Kamphaeng Phet
- Mother: Sirisudhārājadevī

Candrarāja (Thai: จันทราชา) was a Siamese monarch mentioned in the Ayutthaya Testimonies as ruler first of Vicitraprakāra, identified with Kamphaeng Phet, and then of the Sukhothai Kingdom, to which he moved his seat.

Under his rule Sukhothai ceased paying tribute to Indaprasthanagara and defeated it in the war that followed. He was the father of Si Inthrathit, who took Sukhothai in 1238 and founded the Phra Ruang dynasty; on one reading of the Legend of Sawankhalok the ruler Si Inthrathit deposed there was another of his sons.

== Background ==
He was born in the year 516 of the Chula Sakarat Era (1154 CE) (Note: The text records that his reign lasted for thirty years; however, the chronological data presented are internally inconsistent, as it states that his reign commenced in the year 570 of the Chula Sakarat Era and concluded in 576 (1214 CE), which would indicate a reign of only six years. Consequently, if the duration of thirty years is to be accepted as accurate, his accession must have occurred in the year 546 of the Chula Sakarat Era (1184 CE). Given that he is described as having ascended the throne at the age of thirty, this would place his birth in 1154 CE.) to Sirisudhārājadevī (สิริสุธาราชเทวี), a queen consort of Suryaraja of Vicitraprakāra, identified with the present-day Kamphaeng Phet. Sūryarāja was a descendant of King Padumasuriyavamsa. Candrarāja had two queen consorts, Sūryadevī (สุริยเทวี) and Nang Nak (นางนาค). The latter, who potentially was the Tai princess, bore an elder prince named Phra Ruang (IV), also known as Si Inthrathit, while another consort gave birth to a younger prince, likewise named Phra Ruang (V), and one princess named Suvaṇṇadevī (สุวรรณเทวี).

The elder prince was appointed to govern Mueang Bang Yang (เมืองบางยาง; present-day Nakhon Thai), a polity that had formerly served as the power base of his grandfather's cousin, Pra Poa Noome Thele Seri. He would later ascend the throne as the sovereign of the Sukhothai Kingdom in 1238. The Legend of Sawankhalok (ตำนานเมืองสวรรคโลก ฉบับพระมุนินทรานุวัตต์ [มุนินทร์ สุนฺทโร]) records that Phra Ruang IV had an elder brother, Phra Ruang III, who ruled Mueang Fang (เมืองฝาง), identified with present-day Sawangkaburi. That elder brother has been identified with Khom Sabat Khlon Lamphong, who held Sukhothai until Si Inthrathit took it in 1238, which would make the two brothers.

== Accession and reign ==
Candrarāja succeeded his father at Vicitraprakāra at the age of 30, in the year 546 of the Chula Sakarat Era (1184 CE). Subsequently, after the death of his cousin Pra Poa Noome Thele Seri in 1204/05, he moved northward to reconstruct Sukhothai, establishing it as his new political and administrative center. He then ceased the payment of tribute to Indaprasthanagara (อินทปรัษฐ์นคร) following the counsel of his elder son, Si Inthrathit. This defiance precipitated hostilities between the two realms; however, the Sukhothai forces, commanded by Si Inthrādhit, achieved victory. Thereafter, Indaprasthanagara refrained from interfering in Sukhothai's internal affairs. It is further recorded that Lavo was under his authority following this episode.

Where Indaprasthanagara lay is disputed. Thai and Cambodian historiography long equated it with the Angkorian capital of Yaśodharapura, an identification Michael Vickery rejected in 1995 on philological grounds, holding that the sruk indraparāś of the Angkorian inscriptions denotes a village or district rather than a capital. The Ayutthaya Testimonies place it instead east of Sankhaburi, in the Phraek Si Racha region.

Around 1200 CE, Sukhothai’s southern neighbor—a polity in the Phraek Si Racha region known as Chen Li Fu (possibly Indaprasthanagara)—is recorded to have asserted a degree of autonomy by independently dispatching tribute to the Chinese imperial court. Walailak Songsiri associates its rulers with Phimai and the Angkorian Mahidharapura line, while arguing that the polity itself stayed outside Angkorian political control.

== Death and succession ==
Candrarāja's reign concluded in the year 576 of the Chula Sakarat Era (1214 CE). Accounts of subsequent events vary across sources. The Ayutthaya Testimonies assert that he was succeeded directly by his son, Phra Ruang IV or Si Inthrathit; however, this narrative contrasts with the more widely accepted interpretation derived from the Wat Si Chum Inscription, which records that the Mon monarch named E Daeng Phloeng ruled Sukhothai following Candrarāja's death, and was later overthrown in 1219 by Sri Naw Nam Thum and his son Pha Mueang of Mueang Chaliang. Chit Phumisak read the same passage differently, taking E Daeng Phu Loeng (อีแดงพุเลิง) as the name of the elephant fought in the encounter rather than of a ruler, so that on his reading no ruler of that name held Sukhothai.
