= Saen Pom =

Figure in Thai legend

Sculpture of Thao Saen Pom in Tri Trueng, Kamphaeng Phet province

Saen Pom (Thai: แสนปม), also known as Thao Saen Pom, is a figure in Thai legend whose story is connected with Tri Trueng in Kamphaeng Phet province. Different versions of his story appear in local folklore, historical chronicles and a play by King Vajiravudh (Rama VI). A chronicle tradition names him as the father of Uthong, identified in that account with Ramathibodi I, the founder of Ayutthaya.

== Legend ==
In one version, Saen Pom was a vegetable grower whose body was covered in bumps. A princess of Tri Trueng became pregnant after eating an eggplant from his garden. After the birth, the ruler assembled the city's men to identify the child's father. The child accepted a lump of rice from Saen Pom, who was then sent away with the princess and their son.

A chronicle account says that Indra, disguised as a monkey, gave Saen Pom a magical drum that could fulfil his wishes. He used it to remove the bumps from his body. Other tellings describe him founding Thep Nakhon (เทพนคร), where he ruled as Siri Chai Chiang Saen; his son Uthong is subsequently connected with the founding of Ayutthaya.

== Literary adaptations ==
King Vajiravudh wrote a dance-drama based on the story in 1913 and another adaptation in 1925. In this version, Saen Pom is Prince Chinnasen, who disguises himself as a man covered in bumps to approach Princess Usa, the daughter of the ruler of Tri Trueng. After their son identifies him, Chinnasen reveals his identity and returns with the princess and child to his kingdom.
