= Jayasena =

Jayasena (Sinhalese: ජයසේන) is predominantly a Sinhalese family name and rarely a given name (from Sri Lanka). Notable people with the name include:

- Jayasena (Jain monk) (fl. 12th century), Indian monk
- Jayasena Dissanayake (fl. 1996–1998)), Sri Lankan politician
- Hemantha Jayasena (born 1971), Sri Lankan-born Italian cricketer
- Henry Jayasena (1931–2009), Sri Lankan actor
- J. P. Jayasena (1921–1990), Ceylonese politician
- L. B. Jayasena (1920–?), Sri Lankan politician
- Ranmith Jayasena (born 2000), Sri Lankan cricketer
- Sumedha Jayasena (born 1952), Sri Lankan politician
