= Jeremias van Vliet =

Dutch East India Company merchant

- Born: 1602; Schiedam
- Died: February 1663 (aged 60–61)
- Occupation: Merchant
- Spouse: Osoet Pegua
- Children: 3

Jeremias Van Vliet (Thai: เยเรเมียส ฟาน ฟลีต; 1602 – February 1663) or as Thai people call him, Wanwalit (Thai: วันวลิต) was a Dutch merchant of the Dutch East India Company. He was the Trading Station director of Dutch East India Company in the Ayutthaya Kingdom between 1633 and 1642, during the reign of King Prasat Thong. He wrote of five books about Siam in Dutch which were later translated into English.

Jeremias van Vliet was born in Schiedam. He was the youngest son of Eewout Huybretchszoon and Maritge Cornelisdochter van Vliet He left the Netherlands in a ship named Het Wapen van Rotterdam (The Rotterdam Arms) in May 1628 and arrived to Batavia (present-day Jakarta) in 1629 before being assigned to Japan. Before being promoted to a merchant doing business with the Ayutthaya Kingdom in 1633. While in the Ayutthaya Kingdom, Van Vliet had a mistress named Osoet Pagua, a Mon woman, with whom they had 3 daughters. Later, when Van Vliet left Siam in 1641, he fought for daughters with Osoet. As a result, all three daughters stayed with Osoet until she died.

After nine years as Director of the Trading Station in Siam, Jeremias van Vliet was promoted to the second Governor of Dutch Malacca in September 1642. He returned to the Netherlands in 1647 and lived in his homeland until his death in February 1663, aged 61.
