= Osoet Pegua =

Mon businesswoman

- ออสุต พะโค
- Born: 1615; Ayutthaya, Ayutthaya Kingdom
- Died: 1658 (aged 42–43); Ayutthaya, Ayutthaya Kingdom
- Occupation: Businesswoman
- Partner: Jeremias van Vliet (1633/1638–1641/1642)
- Children: 4

Osoet Pegua or Soet Pegu (Thai: ออสุต พะโค RTGS: Osut Phakho; 1615 – 1658), was a Thai businesswoman. She acted as the business agent between the Ayutthaya Kingdom and the Dutch East India Company in the mid-17th century, during which she had a very influential position and enjoyed a de facto monopoly to the trade between the two nations.

== Life ==
Osoet Pegua was a member of the Mon people. She was a successful businesswoman with valuable contacts in the Thai royal court. During this period, South East Asia had a small merchant class, and trade was often left to women, as it was regarded as a part of domestic household duties. Most of the international trade in the region took place between foreign tradesmen and the local rulers, and the foreign tradesmen often conducted temporary marriages with local businesswomen, who acted as the agents between the foreign tradesmen and the ruler.

Osoet Pegua was one of the most famous of these women, and became well known in Thailand as an example of a female business agent, and as an independent woman. She conducted temporary marriages with several of the officials of the Dutch East India Company (VOC), and acted as the agent between King Prasat Thong and the Netherlands, effectively controlling the trade between the two nations. Between 1638 and 1642, she was briefly married to Jeremias van Vliet, the leading official of the Dutch East India Company's station in Thailand.

In 1642, Jeremias van Vliet left her to become governor of Dutch Malacca. This resulted in a conflict between him and Pegua which disturbed trade relations between Ayutthaya and the Netherlands.
