= Mon people =

Ethnic group of Southeast Asia

Mon
ဂကူမန် (Mon) မွန် (Burmese) ชาวมอญ (Thai)
- Flag of Mon State in Myanmar

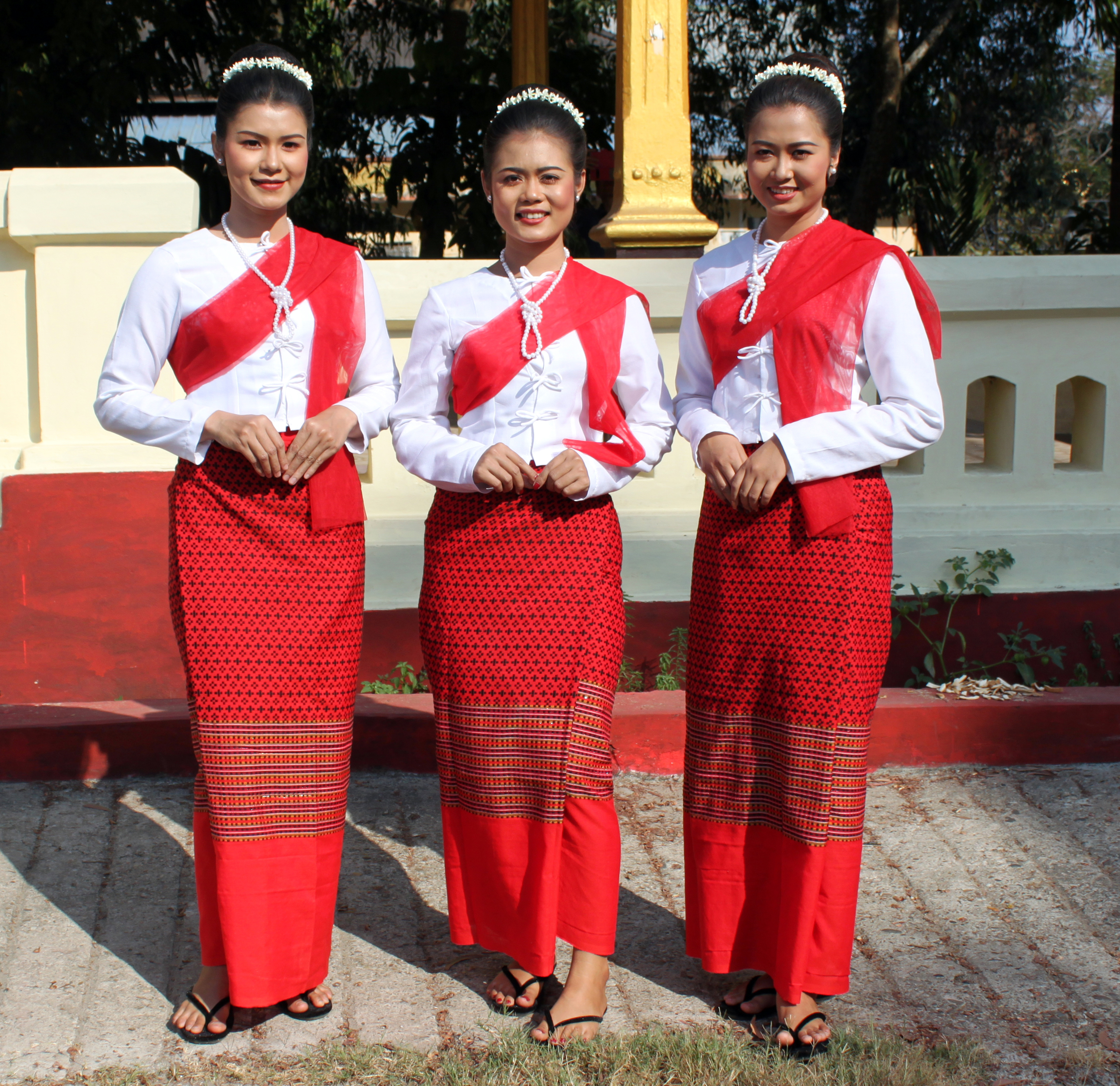
- Mon girls wearing traditional dress in Mawlamyine

Total population
- c. 2.6 million

Regions with significant populations
- Myanmar: c. 1.8 million (Note: According to CIA Factbook, the Mon make up 2% of the total population of Myanmar (55 million), or approximately 1.8 million people.)
- Thailand: 500,000 (Note: The exact number of Mon living in other countries is unknown. They are usually counted as Burmese, Siamese or other Asian in censuses.)
- Laos: 9000
- United States: 8000
- Canada: 650

Languages
- Mon, Burmese, Thai, Lao, Isan, Lanna

Religion
- Theravada Buddhism, Mon folk religion

Related ethnic groups
- Other Austroasiatic groups; (Monic – Nyah Kur)

The Mon (Mon: ဂကူမန်; Mon: ဂကူမည်; Burmese: မွန်လူမျိုး‌, pronounced [mʊ̀ɰ̃ lù mjó]; Thai: มอญ, pronounced [mɔ̄ːn]) are an ethnic group who inhabit Lower Myanmar's Mon State, Kayin State, Kayah State, Tanintharyi Region, Bago Region, the Irrawaddy Delta, and several areas in Thailand (mostly in Pathum Thani province, Phra Pradaeng and Nong Ya Plong). The native language is Mon, which belongs to the Monic branch of the Austroasiatic language family and shares a common origin with the Nyah Kur language, which is spoken by the people of the same name that live in Northeastern Thailand. A number of languages in Mainland Southeast Asia are influenced by the Mon language, which is also in turn influenced by those languages.

The Mon were one of the earliest to reside in Southeast Asia, and were responsible for the spread of Theravada Buddhism in Mainland Southeast Asia. The civilizations founded by the Mon were some of the earliest in Thailand as well as Myanmar and Laos. The Mon are regarded as a large exporter of Southeast Asian culture. Historically, many cities in Myanmar, Thailand, and Laos today, including Yangon, Pathum Thani, Lamphun, Lampang, and Vientiane were founded either by the Mon people or Mon rulers.

Nowadays, the Mon are a major ethnic group in Myanmar and a minor ethnic group in Thailand. The Mons from Myanmar are called Burmese Mon or Myanmar Mon. The Mons from Thailand are referred as Thai Raman or Thai Mon. The Mon dialects of Thailand and Myanmar are mutually intelligible.

== Ethnonyms ==
The Mon have been referred to by different names by different groups throughout history. During the pre-colonial era, the Burmese called them Talaing (တလိုင်း), which was adopted by the British during the colonial era. The term "Peguan" was also used by Europeans when Pegu was the capital of Lower Myanmar.

The use of "Talaing" has been found on inscriptions dating back to the 11th century, but it is now considered a pejorative term and is no longer widely used, except in the context of specific historical terms, such as the eponymous song genre in the Mahagita, the corpus of Burmese classical songs. The etymology of Talaing is debated; it may be derived from Mon, or is a reference to Telinga or Kalinga, a geographic region in southeast India. During the 12th century, the term acquired a derogatory connotation within the Mon community, when it became used by the Mon as a disparaging epithet for the mixed offspring of Mon women and foreign men.

The term "Mon" (spelt မန် in Mon and မွန် in Burmese), which is synonymous with the Burmese word for 'noble,' was likely derived from Old Mon "rmeñ" by way of Middle Mon "rman" (ရာမန်). The ethnonym "rmeñ" was first recorded in the Kyanzittha's New Palace Inscription of AD 1102 in Myanmar. Derivatives of this ethnonym have been found in 6th to 10th-century Old Khmer and 11th-century Javanese inscriptions. The geographic term Rāmaññadesa, which now refers to the Mon heartland on the Burmese coast, was coined by King Dhammazedi in 1479.

The Mon of Myanmar are divided into three sub-groups based on their ancestral region in Lower Myanmar, including Mon Nya (မန်ည; /mòn ɲaˀ) from Pathein (the Irrawaddy Delta) in the west, Mon Tang (မန်ဒိုင်; /mòn tàŋ/) in Bago in the central region, and Mon Teh (မန်ဒ; /mòn tɛ̀ˀ/) at Mottama in the southeast.

== History ==
=== Prehistory ===
The Mon people, who descended from Proto-Austroasiatic people, are believed to have migrated from the Yangtze Kiang valley in Southern China to Southeast Asia between 3,000 and 2,000 BCE, along the Mekong, Salween, Sittaung, Irrawaddy, Ping and Chao Phaya rivers. They eventually settled in locations including as far south as Malaya. Along the way, they brought with them the practice of riverine agriculture, including the cultivation of wet rice. Modern linguistic research by Sidwell (2021) suggests that the locus of Proto-Austroasiatic people was in the Red River Delta area of Northern Vietnam, around 4,000–4,500 years before present.

=== Early history ===
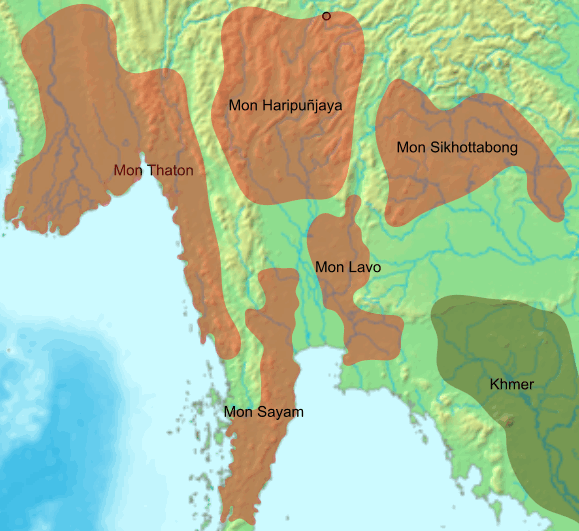
Political entities of the ancient Mon people around the 6th–7th centuries.

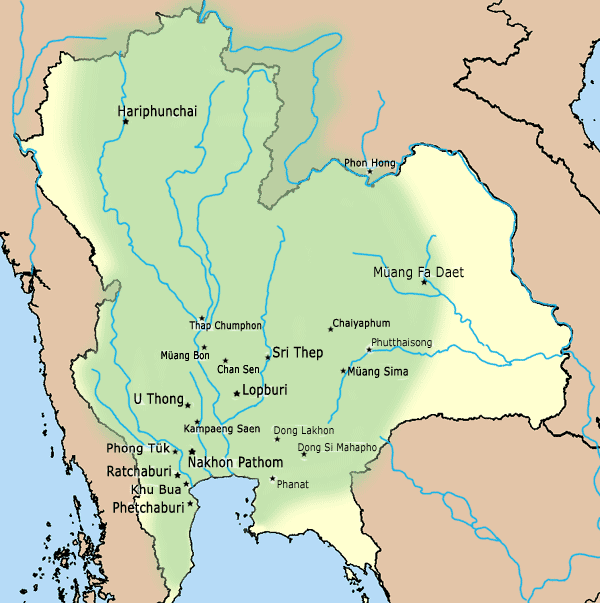
Spread of Dvaravati Culture and Mon Dvaravati sites.

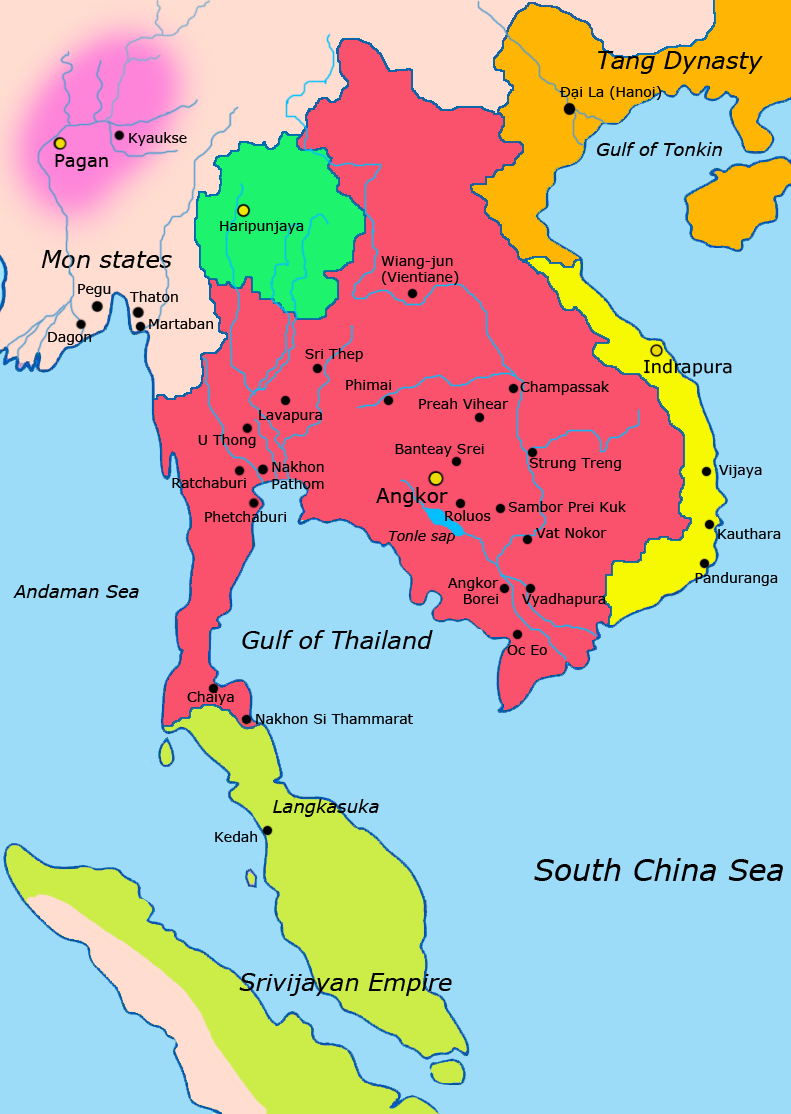
Map of Southeast Asia c. 900 CE, showing the Hariphunchai in light green.

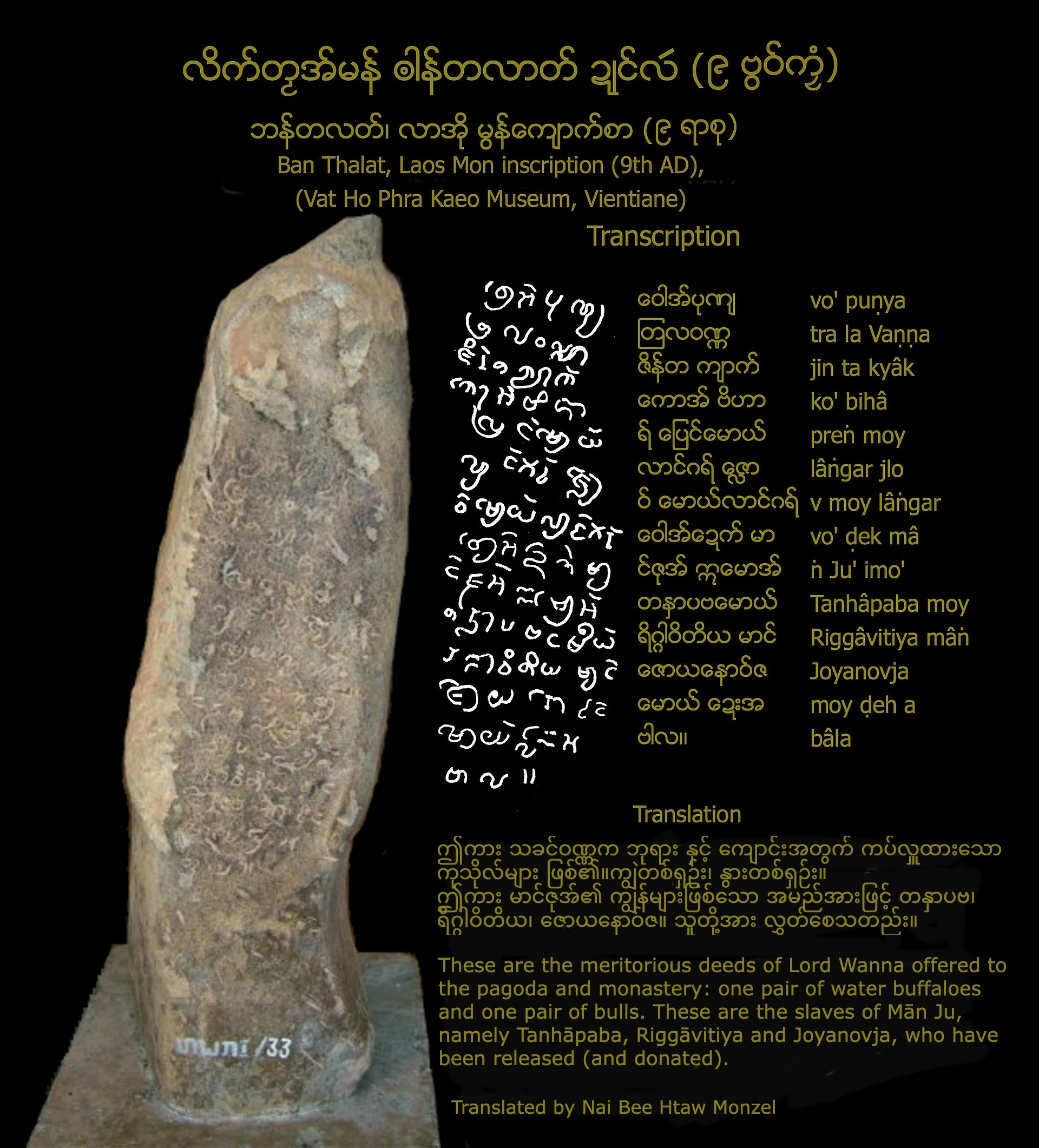
The Ban Tha Lat Mon inscription, dated 9th century CE, was discovered in 1968 in an area where other archaeological evidence confirmed the presence of the ancient Mon people. It is now located at the Haw Phra Kaew Museum in Vientiane, Laos

The ancient Mon are believed to have been one of the earliest peoples of Mainland Southeast Asia. They established some of the earliest civilizations in the region, including Dvaravati in Central Thailand, which spread its culture into Northeastern Thailand, Sri Gotapura in Central Laos (modern Sikhottabong, Vientiane Prefecture), the Hariphunchai Kingdom in Northern Thailand, and the Thaton Kingdom in Lower Myanmar.The Mon were the first to receive Theravada Buddhist missionaries from Sri Lanka, in contrast to their Hindu contemporaries such as Cham peoples. They adopted the Pallava script, and the oldest form of the Mon script was discovered in a cave in modern-day Saraburi, dating back to around 550 CE. Although no remains have been found from the Thaton Kingdom, it is widely mentioned in Bamar and Lanna chronicles.

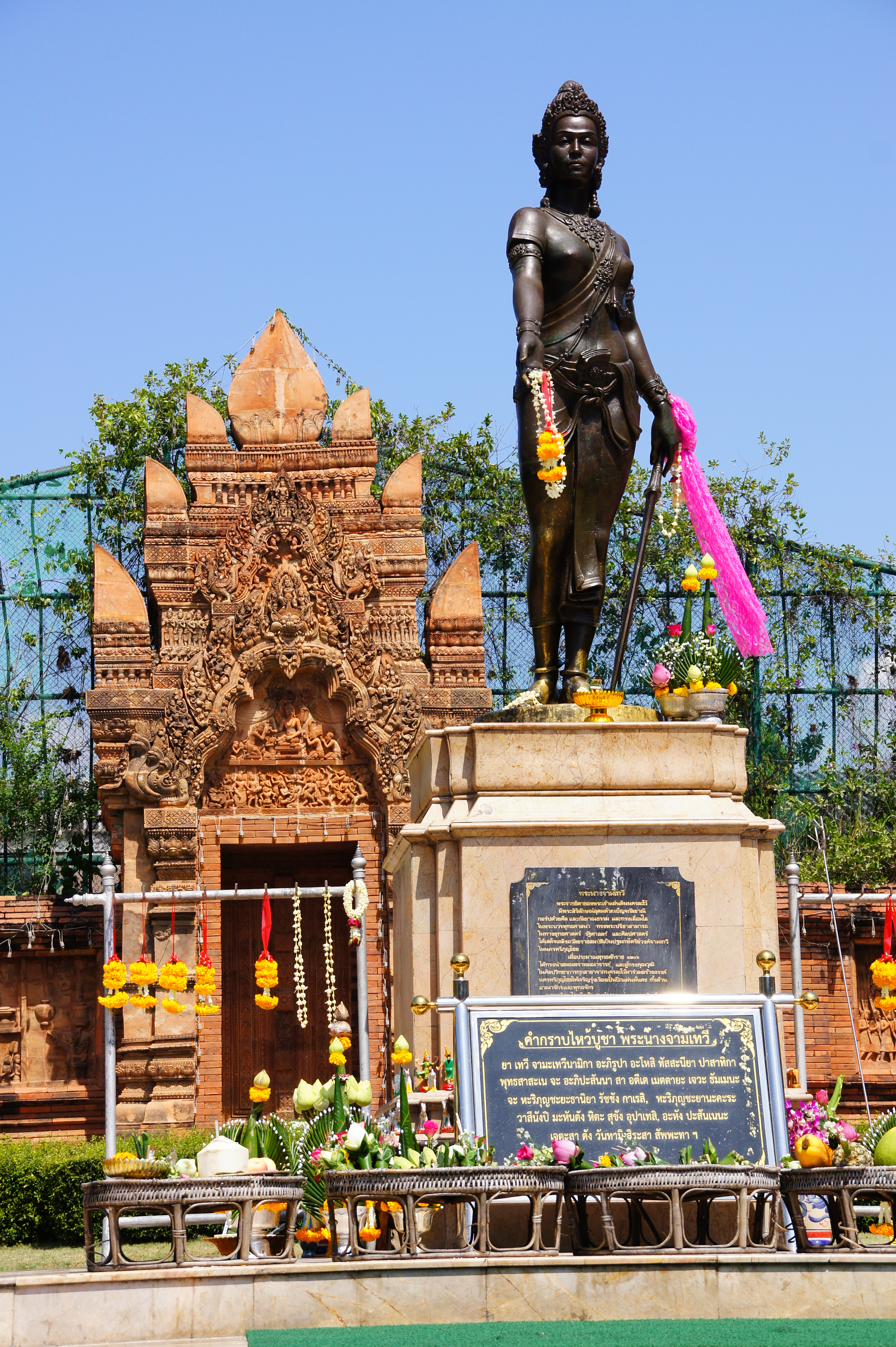
Queen regnant Camadevi Monument in Lamphun, Thailand

According to the Northern Thai Chronicles, the city of Lavo (modern Lopburi) was founded by Phaya Kalavarnadishraj in 648 CE. He reportedly came from Takkasila, which is assumed to be the city of Tak or Nakhon Chai Si. Another historical figure, Phaya Kakabatr, is believed to have also come from Takkasila and established the Chula Sakarat era in 638 CE, which was used by the Siamese and Burmese until the 19th century. Phaya Kalavarnadishraj, the son of Phaya Kakabatr, founded Lavo a decade later. By the late 7th century, Lavo had expanded to the north. The legendary Queen Camadevi, who was said to be a daughter of a Lavo king, according to the Northern Thai Chronicle Cāmadevivaṃsa, came to rule as the first queen of Hariphunchai (modern Lamphun) around 750–800 CE. A few years later, her son Prince Anantayot founded Khelang Nakhon (modern Lampang), playing a significant role in the history of the Hariphunchai Kingdom.

After the year 1000 CE, the Dvaravati Mon people faced constant pressure from Tai migrations from the north and Khmer invasions from the east. Many Dvaravati Mons fled to join other Mon civilizations in the present-day Lower Myanmar, while their descendants, the Nyah Kur people, still reside in Northeastern Thailand. Despite the pressure from the Northern Thai people, the Hariphunchai kingdom managed to survive as a Mon outpost in Northern Thailand.

In 1057 CE, King Anawrahta of the Pagan Kingdom conquered the Thaton Kingdom of the Mon people in Lower Burma. The Mon culture and script had a significant influence on the Bamar, bringing the Mons under Bamar control for the first time. Despite this, the Mon remained a majority in Lower Burma.

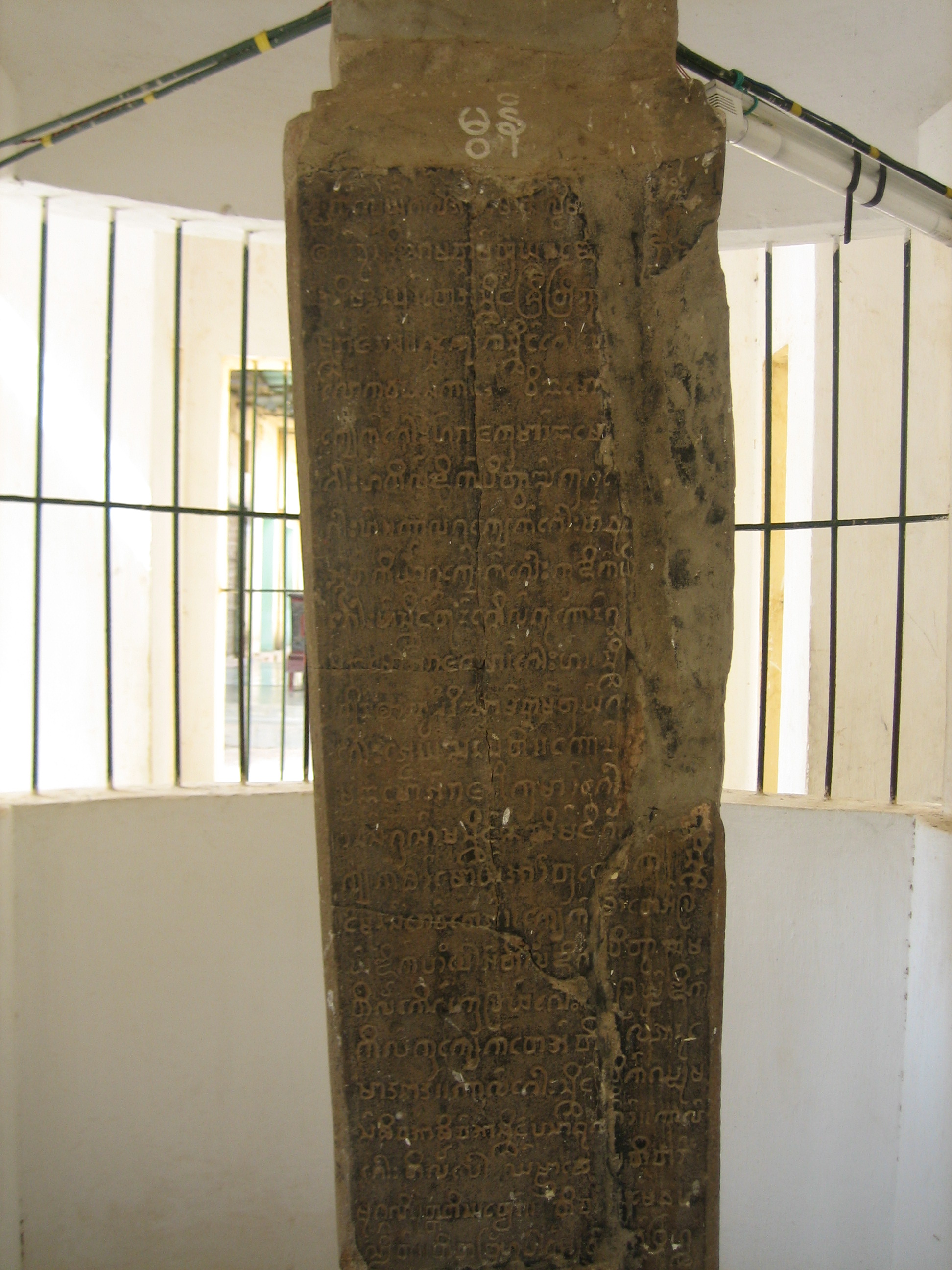
Myazedi Inscription (AD 1113) in Old Mon language in Bagan. One of the oldest surviving stone inscriptions in Myanmar.

On one hand, the Hariphunchai Kingdom of the Mon prospered during the reign of King Aditayaraj in the early twelfth century. He is said to have fought wars with Suryavarman II of Angkor between 1113 and 1150 CE and constructed the Hariphunchai stupa

In 1289, Mangrai also known as Mengrai (Note: The name "Mangrai" is the historical name used in most modern scholarly applications. "Mengrai," which was popularized by a 1907 publication, is more commonly found in popular usage. "Meng" is the Thai Yuan ethnonym for the Mon people) was visited by merchants from the Mon kingdom of Haripunchai. Hearing of the wealth of that kingdom, he determined to conquer it, against the advice of his counselors. As it was thought impossible to take the city by force, Mangrai sent a merchant named Ai Fa as a mole to gain the confidence of its Phaya Yi Ba. In time, Ai Fa became the Chief Minister and managed to undermine the King's authority. In 1292, taking advantage of discontent among the people, Mangrai defeated the Mon kingdom of Haripunchai and added it to his kingdom. Phaya Yi Ba, the last king of Hariphunchai, was forced to flee south to Lampang. A few years later, Phaya Yi Ba's son, King Boek of Lampang, attacked Chiang Mai with a large army. King Mangrai and his second son, Prince Khram, led the defence against the Lampang army. Prince Khram defeated King Boek in personal combat on elephant-back at Khua Mung, a village near Lamphun. King Boek fled by way of the Doi Khun Tan mountain range between Lamphun and Lampang, but he was caught and executed. King Mangrai's troops occupied the city of Lampang, and Phaya Yi Ba was made to flee further south, this time to Phitsanulok. The Mon culture was integrated into Lan Na culture. The Lan Na adopted the Mon script and religion.

=== 13th to 15th centuries ===
In 1287, the collapse of the Pagan Kingdom created a power vacuum. Wareru, who was born to a Mon mother and a Tai father in Donwun Village in the Thaton District, went to Sukhothai for trade and later eloped with the daughter of the king. He established himself as king of the Mon in Martaban (present-day Mottama), and later moved the capital to Pegu. His Hanthawaddy kingdom, which existed from 1287 to 1539, was a period of prosperity and power for the Mon.

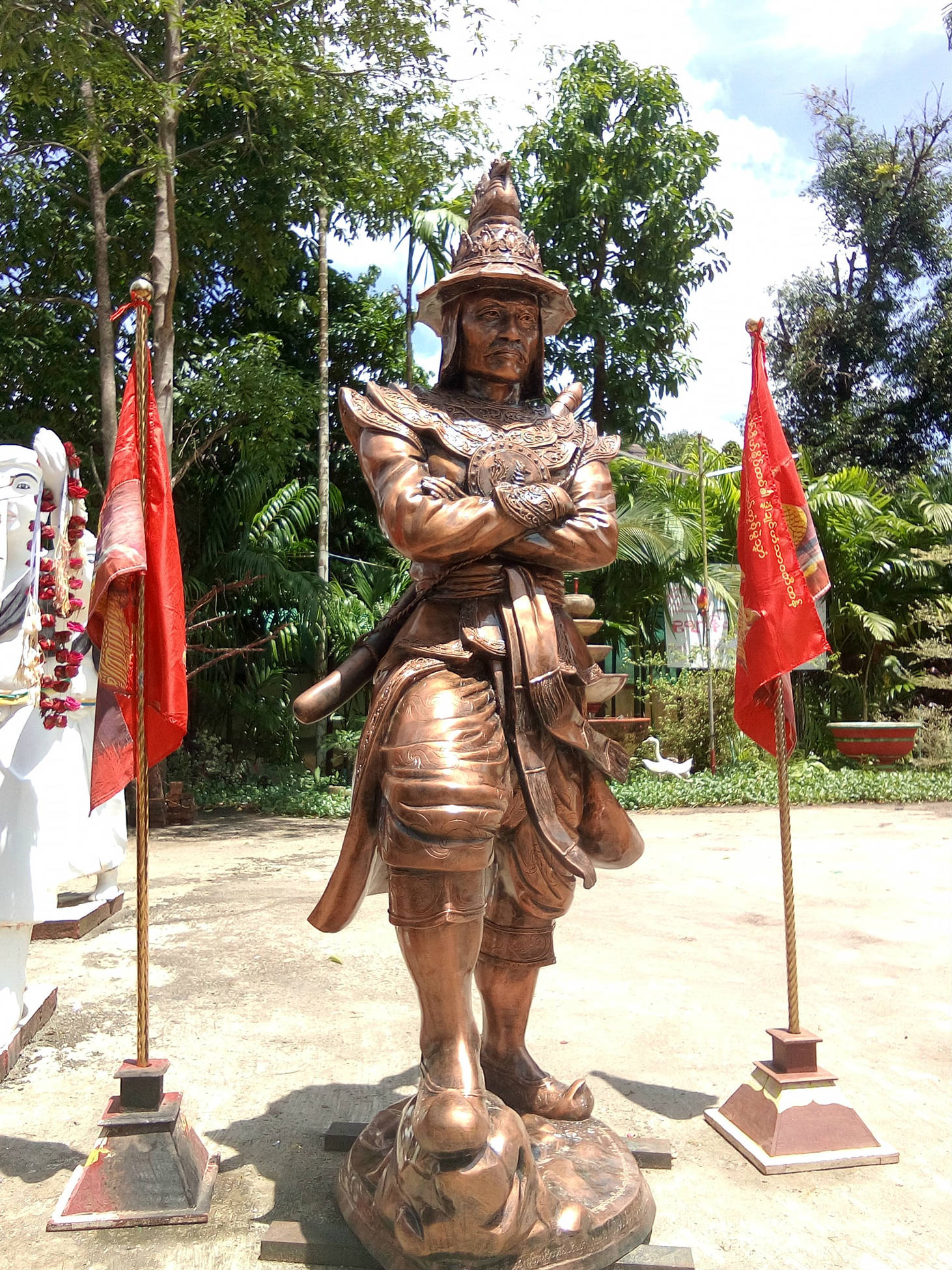
Statue of King Razadarit ruled Hanthawaddy from 1384 to 1421 and successfully unified his Mon-speaking kingdom. He also successfully defended it against Ava Kingdom's attacks during the Forty Years' War.

In the mid-14th century, King Binnya U ruled over the Mon kingdom and successfully defended against an invasion by Lan Na. Despite losing control over the Tenasserim region, he was able to re-establish his capital at Pegu. After his death in 1384, King Razadarit, Binnya U's son, took over and formed an alliance with the kingdom of Arakan. King Razadarit was known for his administration skills and successfully repelling invasions from the Ava Kingdom during his reign. He made significant contributions to the Shwedagon Pagoda and is considered one of the most celebrated Mon kings in history, with his reign lasting from 1384 to 1421.

After King Razadarit's death, there were brief disputes over the succession in Pegu. Eventually, King Razadarit was succeeded by his daughter, Queen Shin Sawbu, in 1453. Queen Shin Sawbu, was a skilled politician and maintained harmony between rival kingdoms. She is remembered for her good nature, renovation of the Shwedagon Pagoda, and construction of important monasteries, such as the Kyaikmaraw near Moulmein.

King Dhammazedi, who succeeded Queen Shin Sawbu in 1470, was a just and wise ruler. He is remembered for his generosity, having donated a significant amount of gold to the Shwedagon Pagoda, as well as for building important temples in the vicinity of Pegu, including the Shwegugyi Pagoda.

=== 16th to 17th centuries ===
In the early sixteenth century, the Bamar regained their momentum at Taungoo, leading to the fall of Hanthawaddy to King Tabinshwehti in 1539. This was after a devastating attack on Lower Burma, in which the northern army overran the Irrawaddy Delta and captured Pegu. The siege of Pegu lasted four years and involved Portuguese mercenaries fighting on both sides. The History of Kings attributes Tabinshwehti's success, in part, to the decadence of the Mon king, Dhammazedi's heir.

As a result of the fall of Pegu, large numbers of Mon refugees fled to Ayutthaya, where the Mon aristocracy joined the court and exercised considerable influence. Meanwhile, back in Burma, the fall of Martaban in 1541 was accompanied by massacre and pillage on a large scale, as was the capture of the old Pyu capital of Prome the following year. This marked the first time, since before the Mongol invasions, that most of Lower and Central Burma was under the control of a Bamar monarch. King Tabinshwehti, founder of the new Toungoo dynasty, celebrated by decorating the Shwedagon and other pagodas with huge amounts of plundered gold.

Although Tabinshwehti's made efforts to win over the Mon people, the Bamar monarch consistently emphasized his claim to Bamar nationality and sovereignty. Nevertheless, Tabinshwehti was relatively more tolerant than later Toungoo kings who outlawed the Mon language and persecuted the Mon people.

Following Tabinshwehti's coronation in 1546, Ayutthaya launched several raids on Lower Burma, including the successful capture of Tavoy in 1548. With the Toungoo dynasty in disarray after Tabinshwehti's death in 1550, the Mon launched another bid for independence under the leadership of the legendary Mon rebel, the Smim Htaw. The Smim Htaw managed to capture the ancient settlement of Dagon and drive the Burmese from Pegu, but a series of intra-Mon disputes allowed Tabinshwehti's general, Bayinnaung, to recapture the city.

Despite Bayinnaung allowing the Mon people to rule over townships and villages and accept them into the military, he did not grant them the right of national self-determination, and therefore the Mon became subservient to the Bamar. Significant Mon uprisings took place during Bayinnaung's reign, including in 1551 and 1564 when the royal palace at Pegu was destroyed.

Following the death of King Bayinnaung, his successor King Nanda instituted oppressive policies against the Mon people, leading to the Mon chiefs Phaya Kiat and Phaya Ram attempting to assassinate Naresuan of Phitsanulok in 1584. However, they learned that Naresuan was not responsible for the policies and instead joined his campaigns against the Toungoo court.

In the 17th century, the Bamar king Anaukpetlun launched a counter-attack against the Mon rebels and captured their stronghold at Syriam. Eventually, the Mon lands were retaken, and the capital was moved to Pegu. An unsuccessful Mon uprising occurred in Martaban in 1661, which led to the pursuit of fleeing Mon refugees into Ayutthaya via the Three Pagodas Pass.

=== 18th to 19th centuries ===
In the early eighteenth century, the power of the Bamar declined rapidly. The Mon rebels joined forces with the Gwe Shan to restore their former Hanthawaddy Kingdom, and in 1740, a monk with Taungoo royal lineage was made king of Pegu. Binnya Dala succeeded him in 1747, and with French support, the Mon established an independent kingdom called the Restored Hanthawaddy Kingdom. However, the kingdom fell to Bamar King Alaungpaya in 1757, who invaded and devastated the kingdom, resulting in the deaths of tens of thousands of Mon civilians, including learned Mon monks, pregnant women, and children. The victorious Bamar soldiers massacred over 3,000 Mon monks in the capital city alone. During the Konbaung dynasty of Burma, the Mon people experienced harsh rule and massacres that led to a significant migration to Siam and Lanna. In addition to facing widespread violence and persecution, the Mon rebelled multiple times, including at Dagon during the reign of Hsinbyushin, resulting in the destruction of the city. In 1814, the Mon rebelled again, but were harshly put down yet again. These uprisings played a major role in the large wave of Mon migration from Burma to Siam.

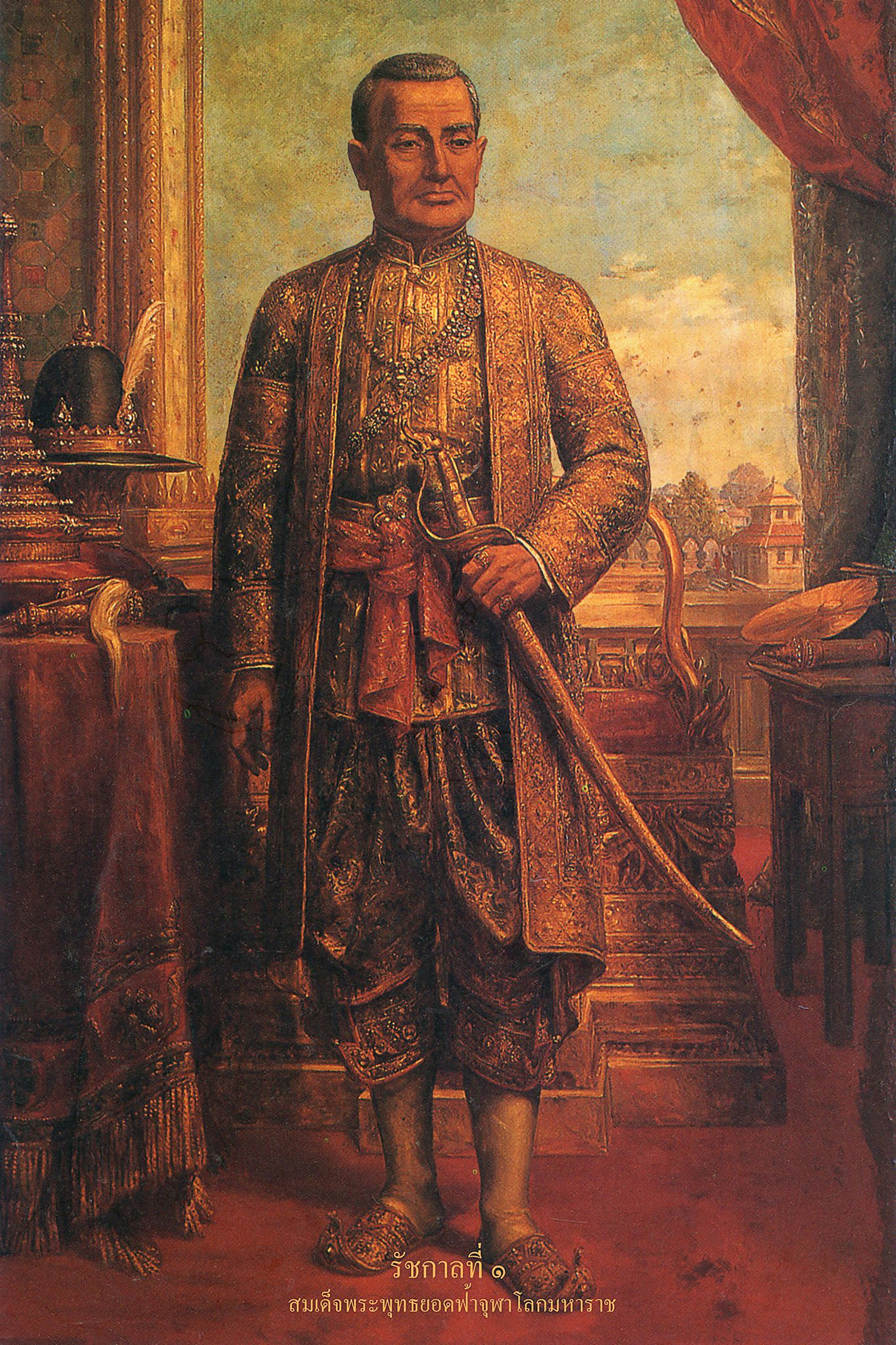
Rama I – founder of the reigning Chakri dynasty of Siam (now Thailand)

On the one hand in Siam side, after the fall of Ayutthaya in 1767, two descendants of Mon aristocrats who moved to Siam in 1584; Phraya Pichai and Phraya Chakri became the left and right-hand man of King Taksin of Thonburi, and they largely helped Taksin's campaigns in the liberation of Siam from Burmese occupation and reuniting Siam. King Taksin himself also was a Sino-Mon descent and his maternal grandmother was a sister to chief of Siam's Mon community.

After the collapse of Taksin's Thonburi Kingdom, Phraya Chakri founded the Chakri dynasty and ascended the throne in 1782 as Rama I. Rama I was born to Thongdi, a leading Mon nobleman serving the royal court in Ayutthaya in 1737. Rama I's queen consort Amarindra was born to a wealthy Mon family who migrated to Siam in the earlier times. Rama I founded Bangkok City and moved the capital from Thonburi to Bangkok. When a huge wave of Mon migrations from Burma (now Myanmar) to Siam (now Thailand) happened in 1814, his grandson, the Prince Mongkut (later Rama IV) proceeded to welcome the Mon himself at the Siam-Burma border.

The Mon in Thailand settled mainly in certain areas of Central Thailand, such as Pak Kret in Nonthaburi, Phra Pradaeng in Samut Prakan and Ban Pong, among other minor Mon settlements. Mon communities built their own Buddhist temples. Over time, the Mons were effectively integrated into Siamese society and culture, although maintaining some of their traditions and identity.

=== 19th to 20th centuries ===
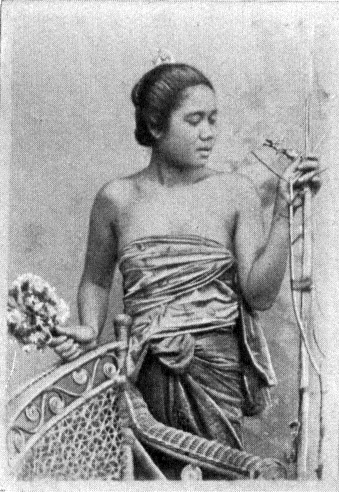
An ethnic Mon woman in Thailand, in 1904.

Burma was conquered by the British in a series of wars. After the Second Anglo-Burmese War in 1852, the Mon territories in Burma were completely under the control of the British. The British aided the Mons to free themselves from the rule of the Bamar monarchy. Under Bamar rule, the Mon people had been massacred after they lost their kingdom and many sought asylum in the Thai Kingdom. The British conquest of Burma allowed the Mon people to survive in Southern Burma. However, the British never gave restore the Mons their old kingdom and would ruthlessly crush Mon resistance with their superior weapons.

In 1947, Mon National Day was established to commemorate the founding of Hanthawady, the last Mon Kingdom which was centered in Pegu. The holiday is observed on the full moon of the 11th month of the Mon lunar calendar, except in Phrapadaeng, Thailand where it coincides with the Songkran festival.

The Mon soon became anti-colonialists. Following the grant of independence to Burma in 1948, they sought self-determination. U Nu, the first Prime Minister of Burma refused the Mon self-determination. Mon separatist groups have risen in revolt against the central Burmese government on a number of occasions, initially under the Mon People's Front and from 1962 through the New Mon State Party (NMSP). The BSSP-led government established a partially autonomous Mon State in 1974 out of portions of Tenasserim and Pegu regions. Resistance continued until 1995 when NMSP and ruling SLORC agreed a cease-fire and, in 1996, the Mon Unity League was founded.

=== 21st century ===
Nowadays, the Mon are a major ethnic group in Myanmar and a minor ethnic group in Thailand. The Mons from Myanmar are called Burmese Mon or Myanmar Mon. The Mons from Thailand are referred as Thai Raman or Thai Mon. A recent study shows that there is a close genetic relationship between central Thai and Mon people in Thailand, who migrated from southern Myanmar.

Due to the post-independence internal conflict in Myanmar, many ethnic Mon from conflict zones have migrated to the First World countries via the refugee camps along the Thai-Myanmar borders and in Malaysia. The Myanmar Mon refugee communities can be found in the United States (the largest community being in Fort Wayne, Indiana and the second largest being Akron, Ohio), Australia, Canada, Norway, Denmark, Finland, Sweden, and the Netherlands.

== Language ==
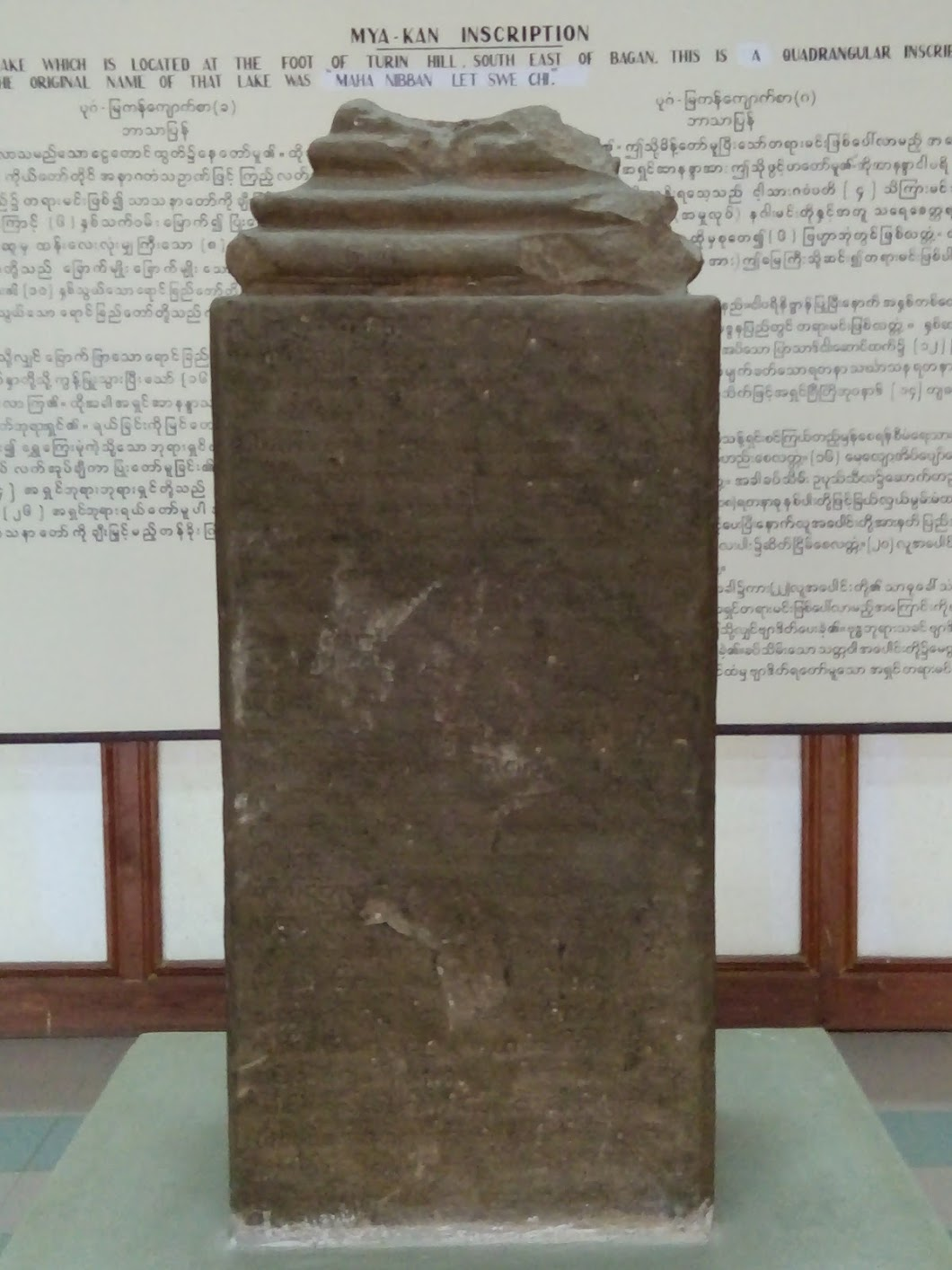
Mon script on the Myakan inscription (ca. 1084–1112 CE)

The Mon language is part of the Monic group of the Austroasiatic languages (also known as Mon–Khmer language family), closely related to the Nyah Kur language and more distantly related to Khmer and Vietnamese. The writing system is based on Indic scripts. The Mon language is one of the earliest documented vernacular languages of Mainland Southeast Asia.

Many languages in the region have been influenced by the Mon language. Tai Tham alphabet and Burmese alphabet are adaptations of the Mon script. Tai Tham alphabet is primarily used for Northern Thai language, Tai Lue language, Khün language and Lao Tham language. The Burmese alphabet is used for Burmese language, Shan language, S'gaw Karen language and other languages.

Historically, the Tai adopted the Mon alphabet, which the Tai developed into their own writing systems as the Tai Tham alphabet, for the Thai Yuan people in the northern Thailand.

Although Thai adopted more features from the Old Khmer alphabet than from the Mon, plenty of vocabulary in Thai language today were derived from the Mon language. Burmese has derived and borrowed vocabulary from the Mon language, especially related to administration, architecture, cloth, cuisine and flowers.

Nowadays, the Mon language is recognised as an indigenous language in both Myanmar and Thailand. Due to the fall in number of Mon language speakers in the recent decades, Mon was classified as a "vulnerable" language in UNESCO's 2010 Atlas of the World's Languages in Danger.

The language has an estimated 800,000 to 1,000,000 speakers

== Culture ==
=== Symbol ===
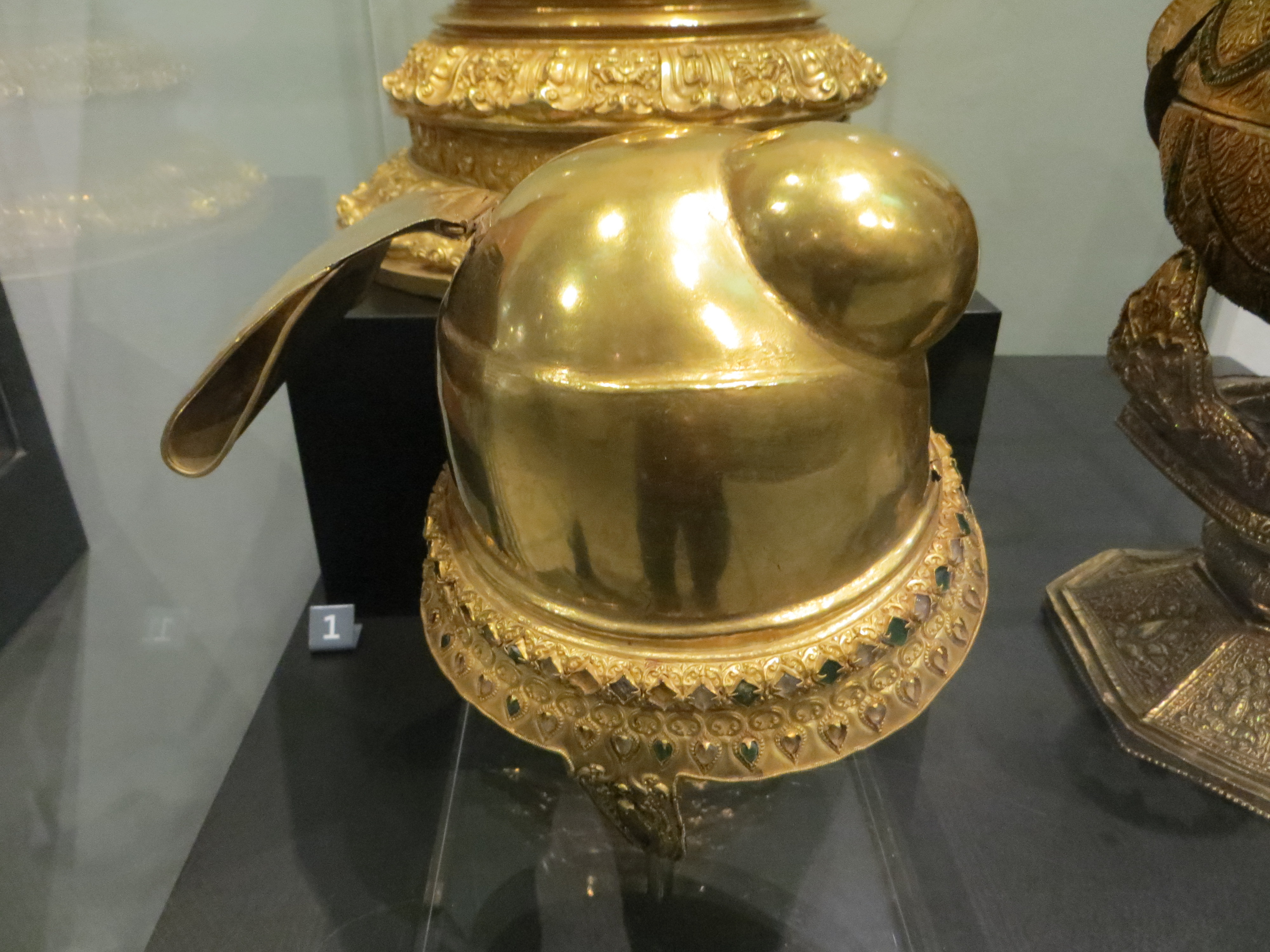
Ceremonial helmet of Queen regnant Shin Sawbu, now at the V&A Museum, London

The symbol of the Mon people is the hongsa (Mon: ဟံသာ, [hɔŋsa]), a mythological water bird that is often illustrated as a swan. It is commonly known by its Burmese name, hintha (Burmese: ဟင်္သာ, IPA: [hɪ́ɰ̃θà]) or its Thai name: hong (หงส์). The hongsa is the state symbol of Myanmar's Bago Region and Mon State, two historical Mon strongholds. Also, the hongsa is the city symbol of Thailand's Pak Kret City, a historical Mon settlement area.

Hongsa (the symbol of Mon people)

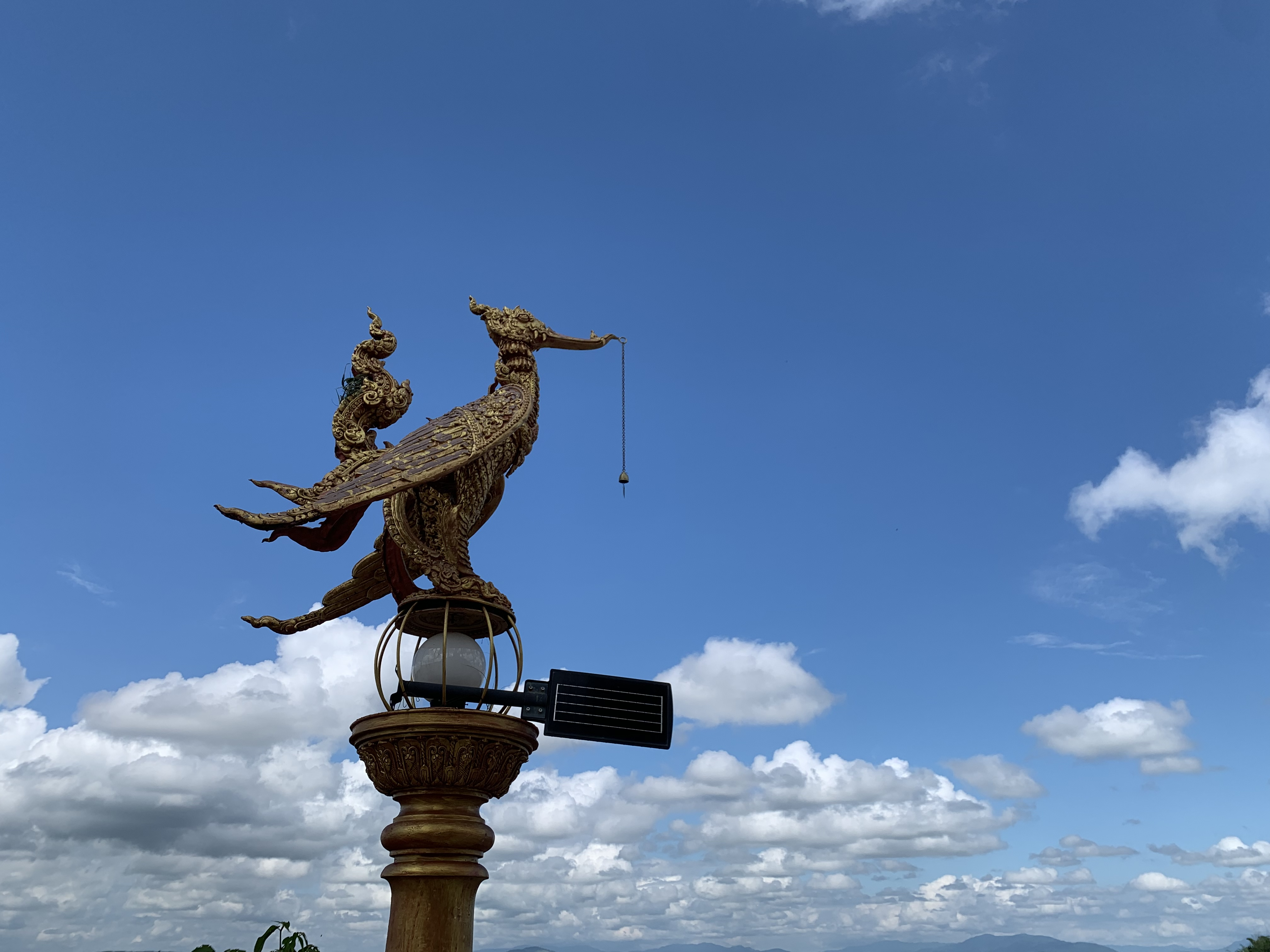
Hongsa in Thai-Mon style

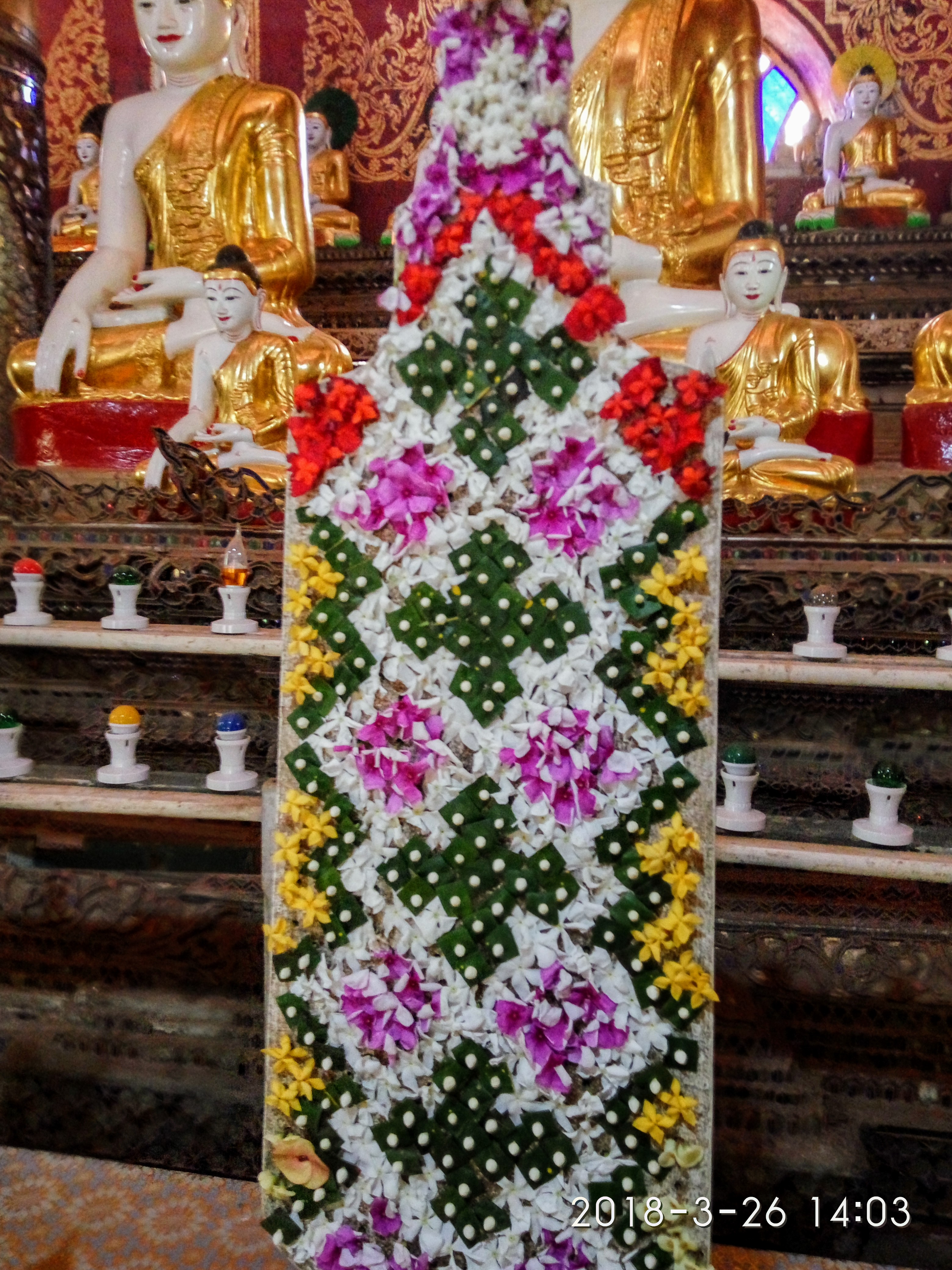
Mon Traditional Flower-garlands

=== Music ===
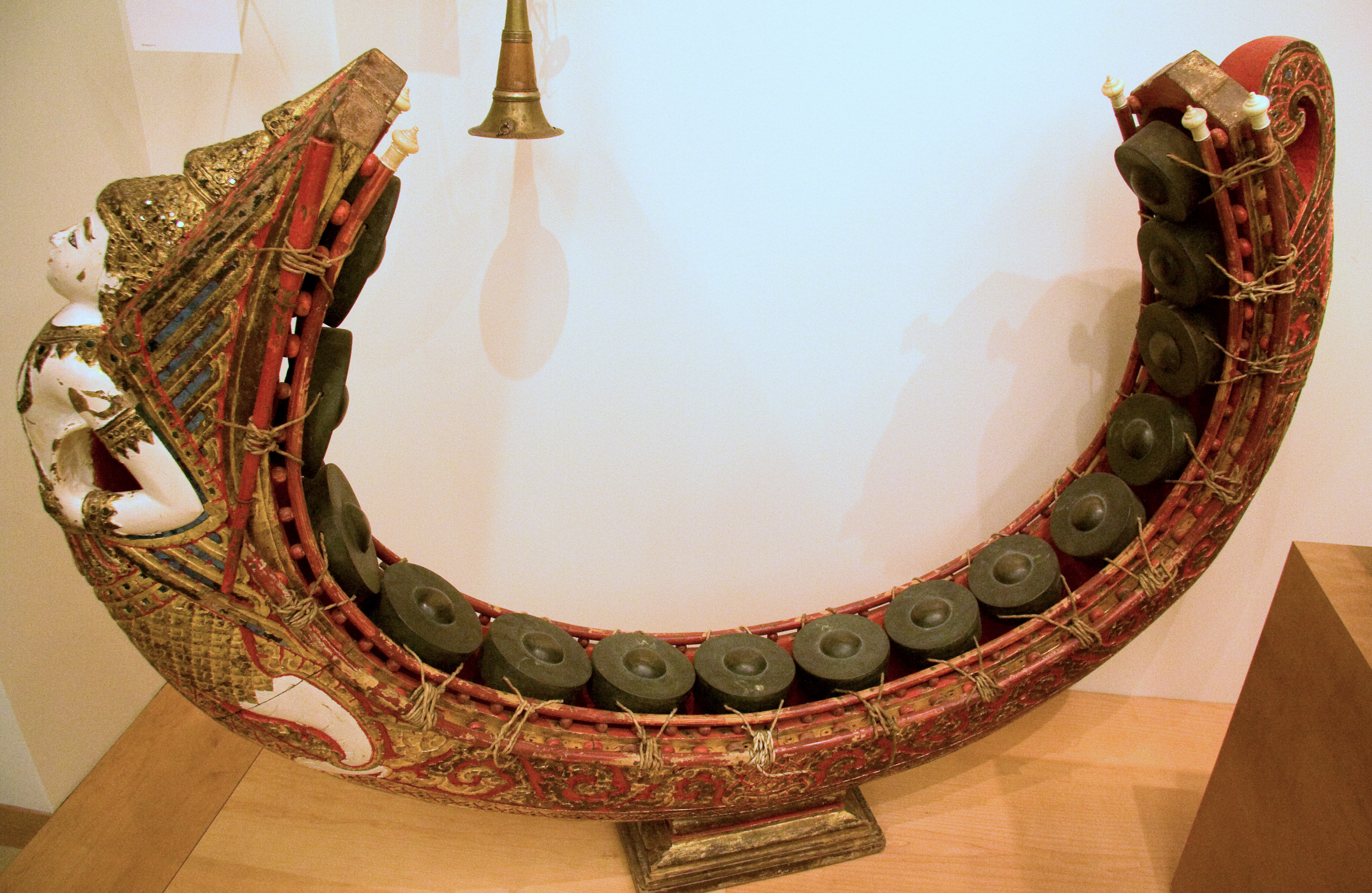
Khong mon in Thai-Mon style

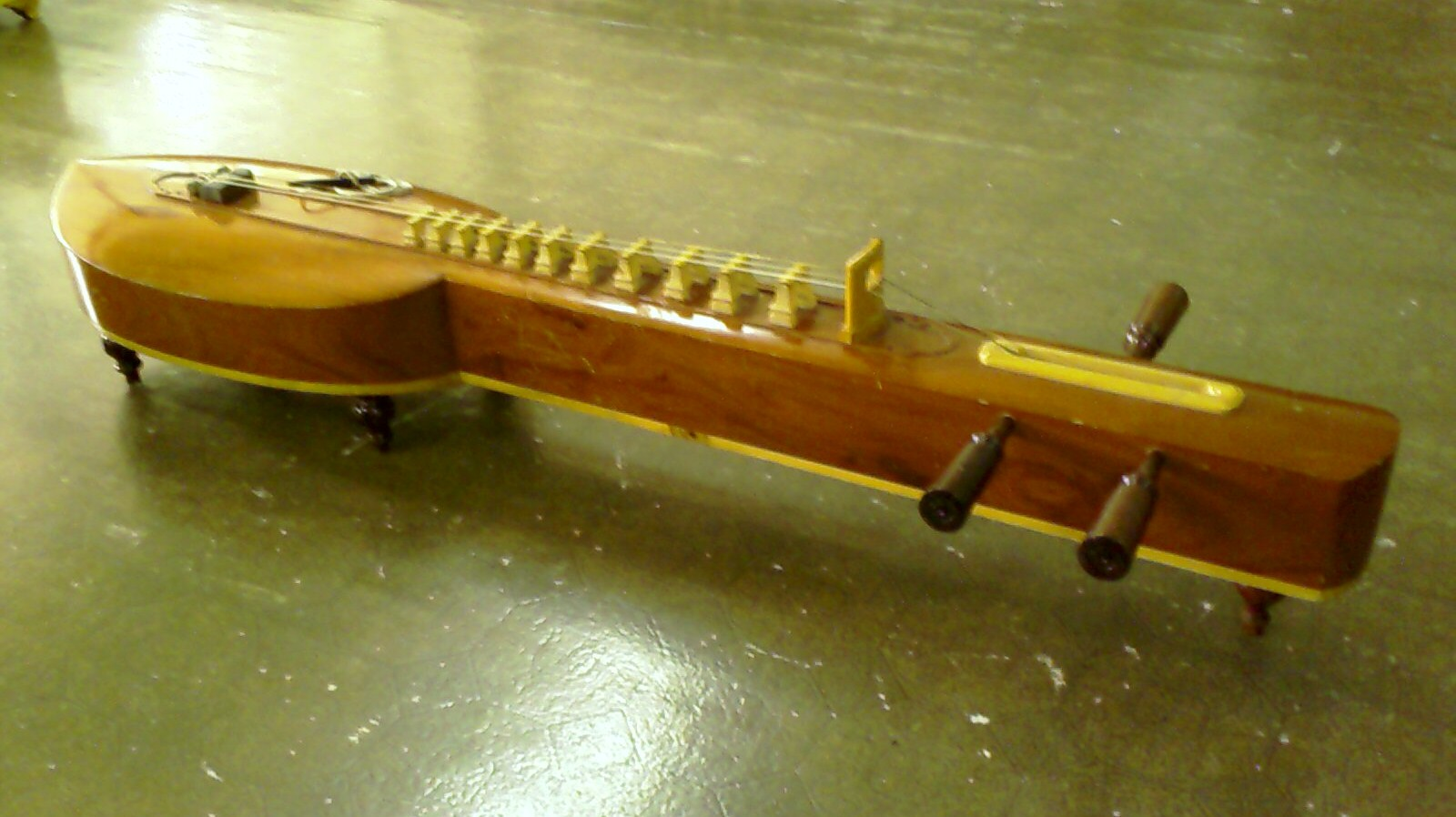
The musical instrument known as 'Kyam' in Thai-Mon style is also called 'Chakhe'

Mon culture and traditional heritages includes spiritual dances, musical instruments such as the kyam or "crocodile xylophone", the la gyan hsaing gong chime, the saung harp and a flat stringed instrument. Mon dances are usually played in a formal theater or sometimes in an informal district of any village. The dances are followed by background music using a circular set of tuned drums and claps, crocodile xylophone, gongs, flute, flat guitar, harp, violin, etc.

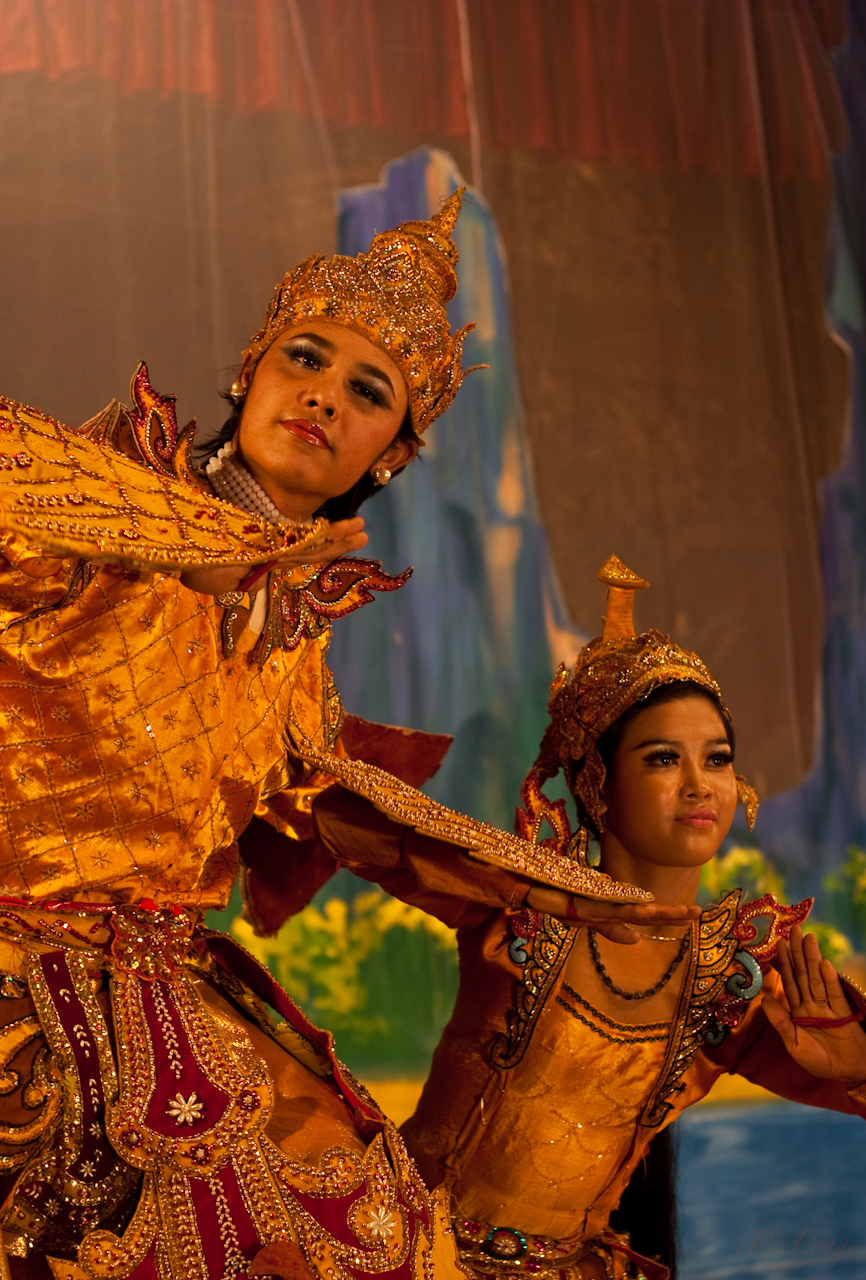
A theatrical performance of the Mon dance

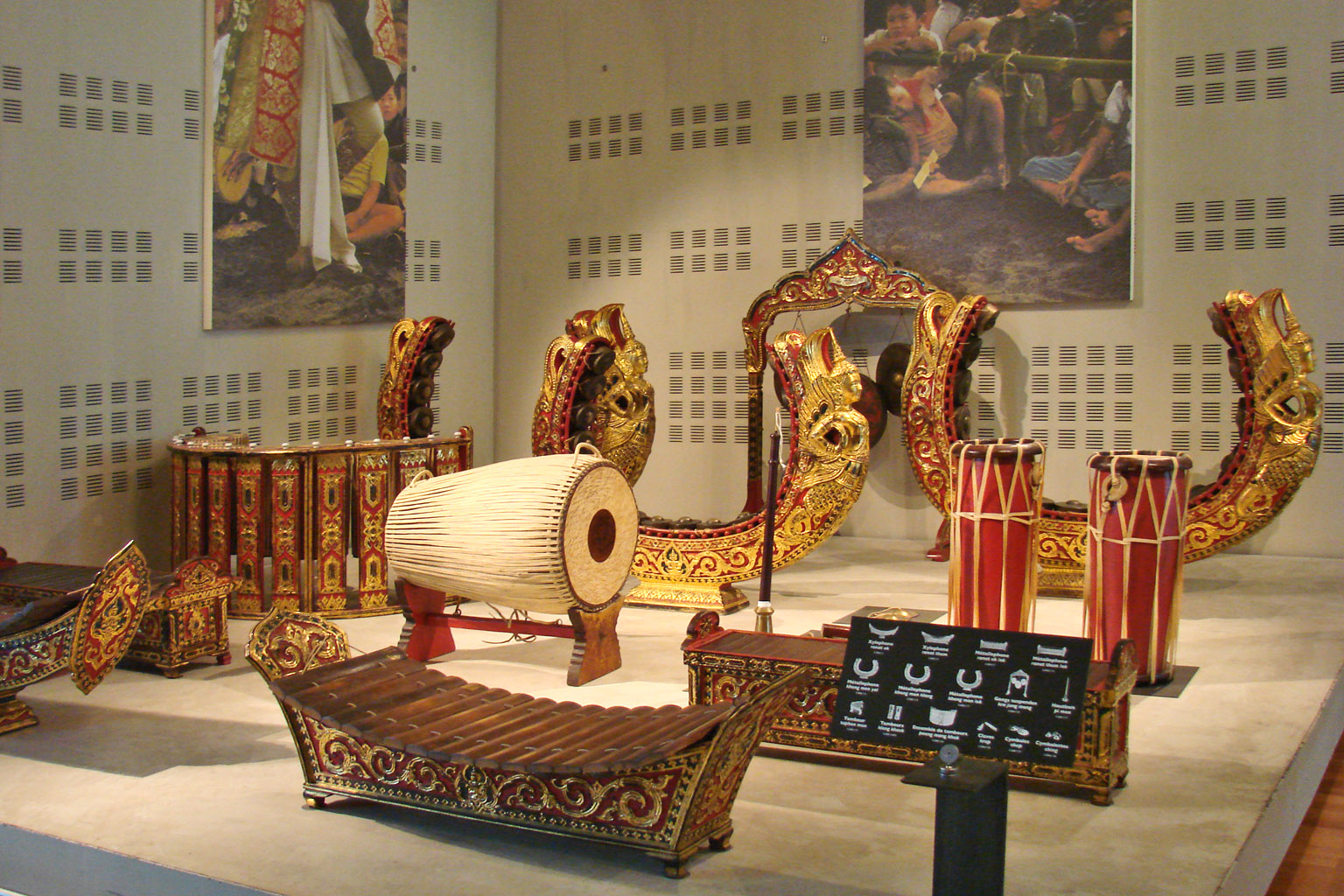
Mon musical instruments

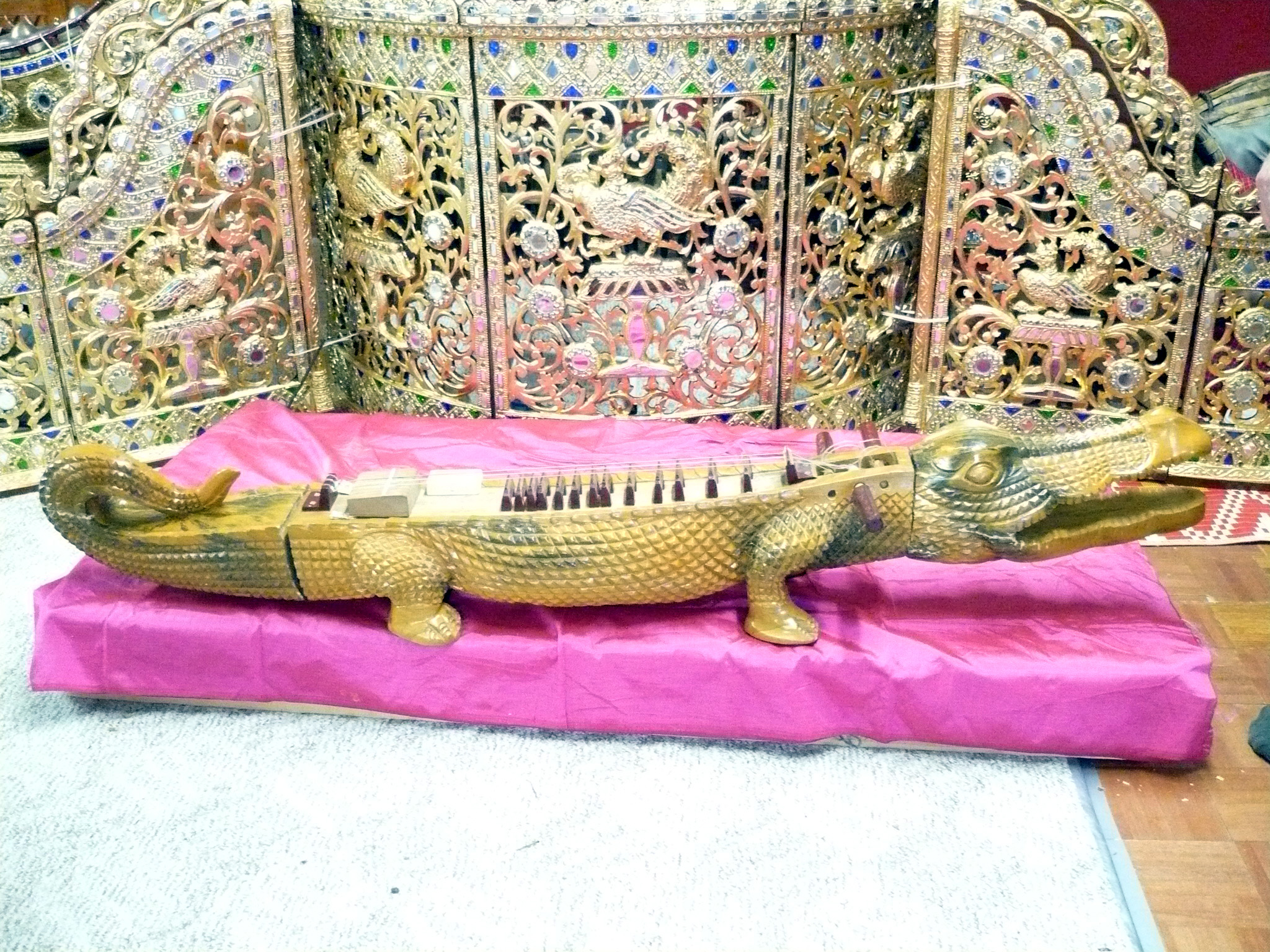
A kyam

=== Art ===
==== Pottery ====
The Mon people in Siam have been producing pottery for over 200 years. Their ancestors settled in Koh Kret and Nakhon Sawan, using their pottery making skills to earn a living in both places. The area is known for its high-quality clay and the Mon pottery, including containers and decorative items, is a symbol of their heritage and expertise. The pottery is made of porous earthenware in light orange to red color and features unique designs inspired by nature. Despite technological advancements, the Mon continue to preserve this traditional handicraft.

==== Floral umbrellas ====
Floral umbrellas have a long history in Mon culture, dating back to ancient times. In fact, inscriptions have been discovered in northern Thailand that mention the use of umbrellas and palm-leaf manuscripts in Mon religious ceremonies during the Hariphunchai Kingdom, which lasted from the 7th to the 13th century. Today, floral umbrellas are still used in various ceremonies and festivals throughout Mon communities, such as weddings, ordinations, and temple fairs, and remain an important part of Mon cultural heritage.

=== Literature ===
Mon literature is a rich collection of works created by the Mon people in Myanmar and Thailand, including chronicles, poems, songs, folktales, and religious texts. "Lik Smin Asah" is a legendary tale about the establishment of the city of Pegu, "Sangada" is a well-known Mon folktale that has been adapted into Thai and Laotian literature as "Sangsinchay", and "Rājādhirāj" or "Razadarit" is a chronicle of the Mon king translated into Burmese as "Razadarit Ayedawbon" and into Thai as "Rachathirat." Mon literature is considered important cultural heritage in Myanmar and Thailand. These works are highly valued for their cultural and historical significance.

=== Religion ===
The Mon people have a mix of spiritual beliefs and Theravada Buddhism as their religion, with a majority of them practicing the mixture. Before Buddhism, three traditional beliefs were followed in the Mon Kingdom, including belief in Kalok (spirits), Isi (holy hermits), and Hinduism. The Mon people traditionally believed in various types of Kaloks (spirits), including family/clan kalok, guardian kalok of the house, town, village, farms, forest, and mountain. Kalok is considered to be a spirit, demon, or immaterial being that can take on a visible form.

=== Festivals ===
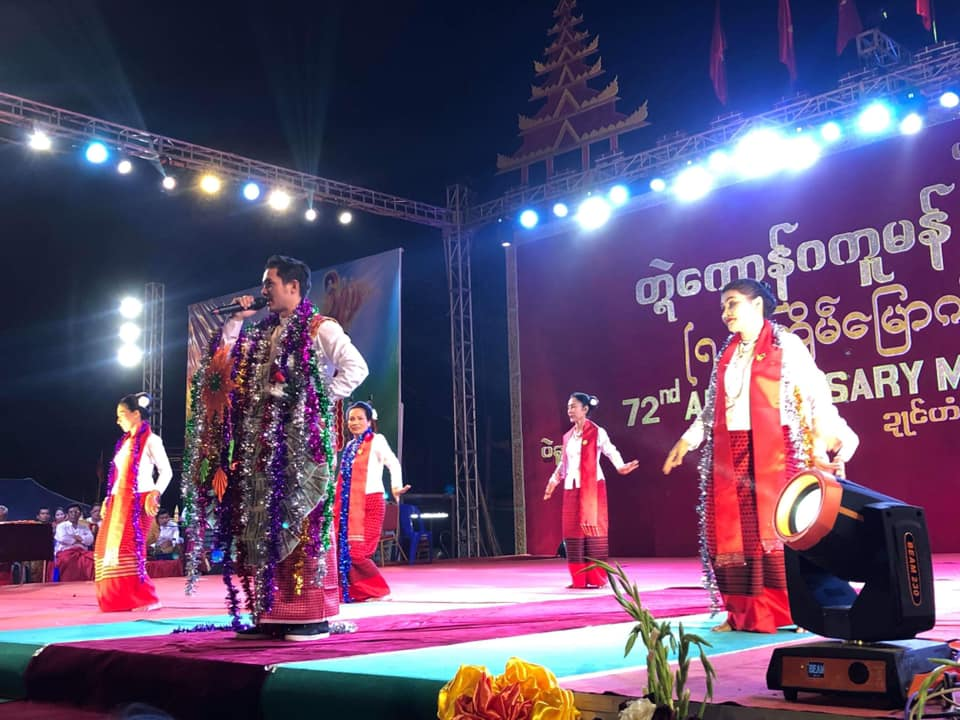
Mon National Day celebration in Bago, Myanmar (2019)

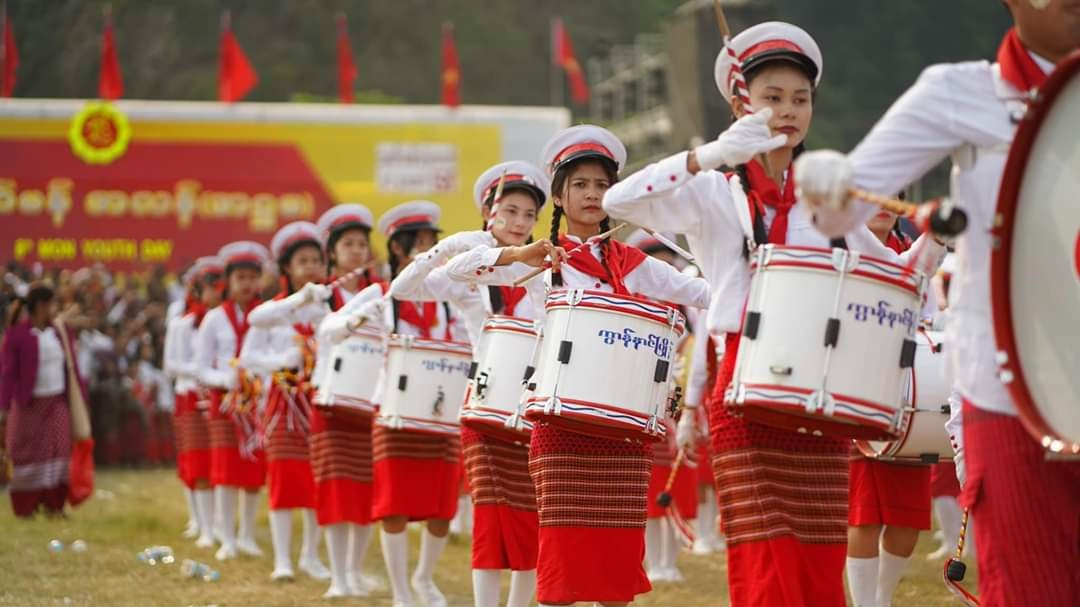
Mon Youth Day celebration

Festivals celebrating Mon culture are an important part of the Mon community in Myanmar and Thailand. One such festival is the Loi Hamod Festival, which has its roots in the Hariphunchai era and is believed to be the precursor to the Loi Krathong Festival. While the festival is still observed in some Mon communities in Lamphun Province, it is now referred to as "Jong Gring", which is derived from other Mon cultural practices and means "Loi Krathong". However, the Jong Gring tradition of Mon people in Lamphun is different from the general Loi Krathong festival, as it resembles the ancient "Loi Hamod" tradition of Mon people in Hariphunchai, which involves offering food, both fresh and dried, and lighting some lanterns and small krathongs.

Another traditional Mon festival is the Luknoo Festival, which marks the end of the monsoon season and the beginning of the new year. It involves the launch of homemade rockets, food offerings to spirits, and cultural activities such as music, dance, and games. The festival is an important part of Mon culture and helps to connect with the community, preserve traditions, and bring good luck for the coming year.

The Mon Floating Boat Festival is another traditional festival celebrated during the Mon New Year. It features boat races, music, dance, feasting, releasing lanterns, and gift exchanging. The festival brings the Mon community together to make offerings for peace and prosperity.

The Hae Hang Hong Tong Ta Khab Festival, also known as the Tawai Tong Ta Khab Festival, is an important tradition of the Mon people in Thailand, primarily in Pathum Thani, Pak Kret, and Phra Pradaeng. The festival is held during the Songkran festival and features a parade of flags that move towards the Hongsa Pole to offer tribute to the Buddha. Prior to the festival, the flags are prepared through the collective efforts of many individuals who come together to sew and decorate them.

During the Songkran festival in Thailand, the Mon residents of Phra Pradaeng District host unique Mon traditional ceremonies and folklore performances. These festivals and traditions are a testament to the rich cultural heritage of the Mon people and serve as an important way to pass down their history and customs to future generations.

=== Traditional dress ===
Mon women wear traditional shawl-like Sbai, known as Yat Toot in Mon language, diagonally over the chest covering one shoulder with one end dropping behind the back. This tradition distinguished Mon women from other 134 ethnic groups in Myanmar. Archaeological evidence from the Dvaravati era portrays that Dvaravati ladies wearing what seems to be a piece of Sbai hanging from their shoulder. Mon people of Myanmar and Thailand today are the descendants of Dvaravati.

Mon men in Myanmar wear clothes similar to the Bamars. Those living in Thailand have adopted Thai style garments. It seems that Mon clothing has been shaped through its dynastic traditions as well as external influences.

Thanaka is a yellowish-white cosmetic paste made from ground bark that is widely used in Myanmar, particularly by the Mon people. It is applied to the face, arms and legs as a form of sun protection and to beautify the skin. Thanaka has been a part of Mon culture for centuries and remains an important part of traditional beauty and skincare practices in the country.

=== Cuisines ===
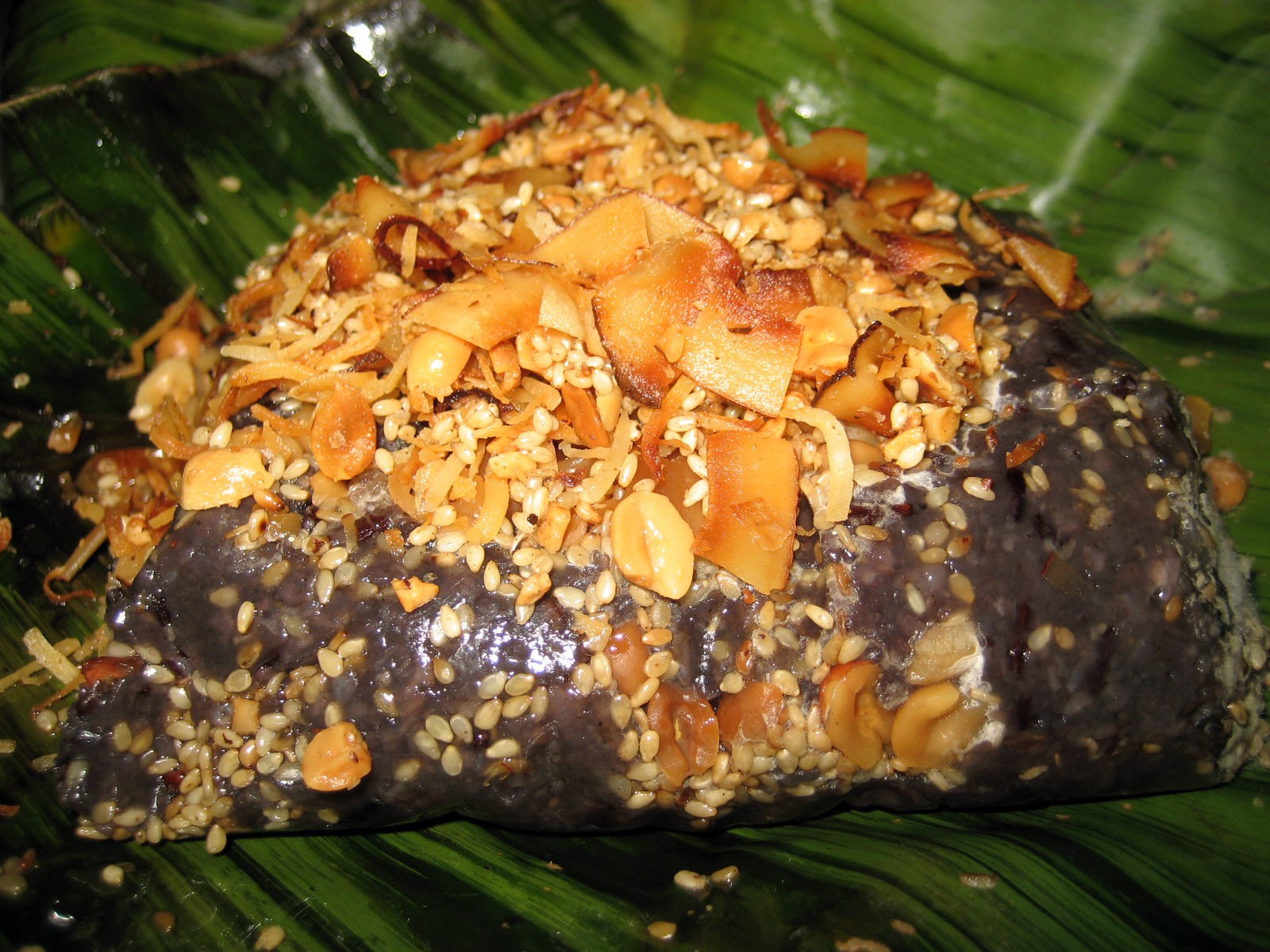
Htamanè glutinous rice

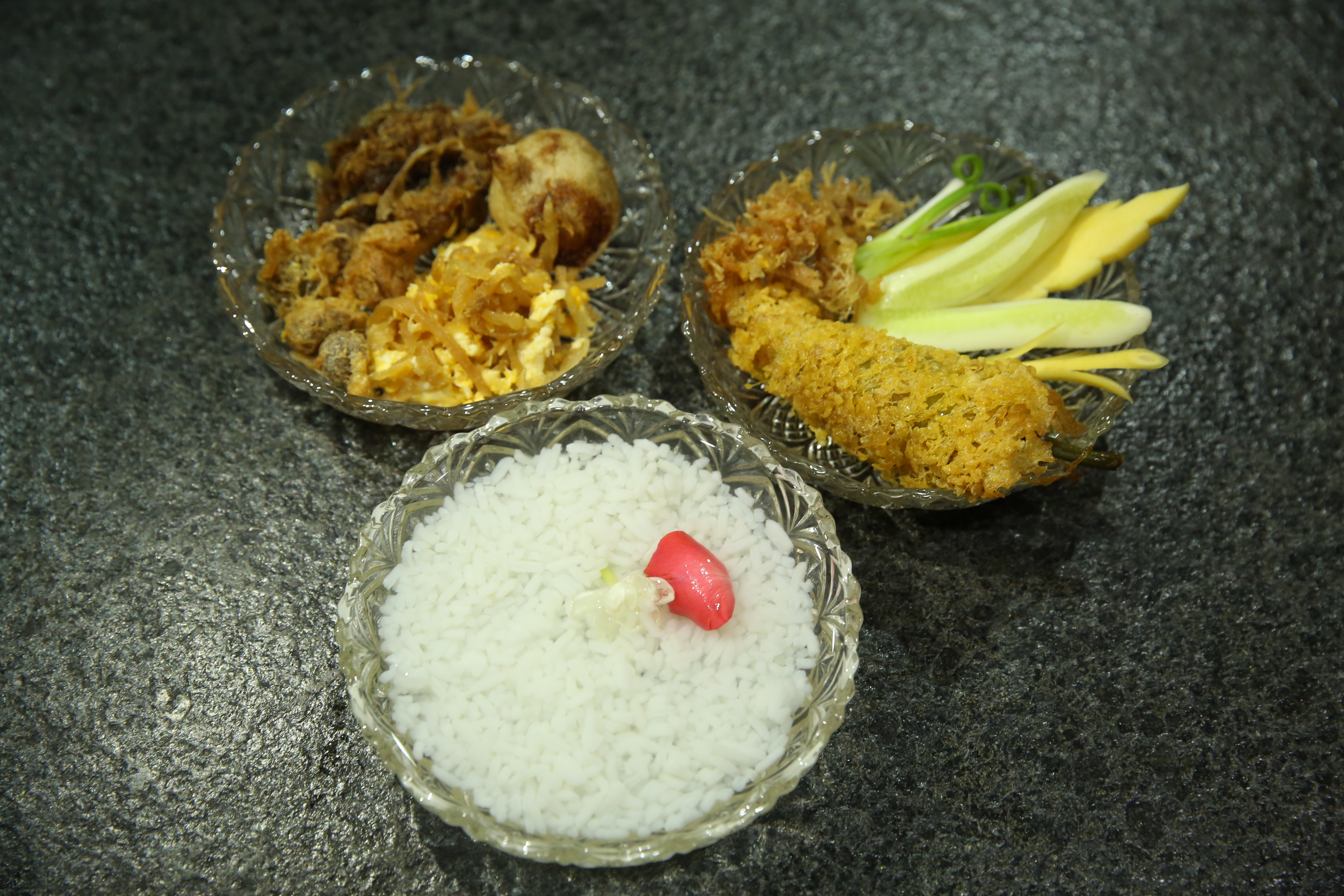
Mon inspired Khao Chae

Mon cuisines and culinary traditions have had significant influences on the Burmese cuisine and Central Thai cuisine today. Some of dishes that are now popular in Myanmar (Burma) and Thailand were originally Mon dishes. For example, Htamanè (ထမနဲ) in Myanmar, and Khanom chin and Khao chae in Thailand. A traditional Mon dish served with rice soaked with cool candle-and-jasmine-scented water is consumed by the Mon people during the Thingyan (Songkran) Festival in the summer. In Thailand, the dish is known as Khao chae (ข้าวแช่) and was considered "royal cuisine". As the dish is served during Thingyan as part of their merit-making, it is known as Thingyan rice (သင်္ကြန်ထမင်း) in Myanmar today. Like Cambodian, Lao, Thai and Vietnamese cuisine, fermented fish seasoning are used in Mon cuisine.

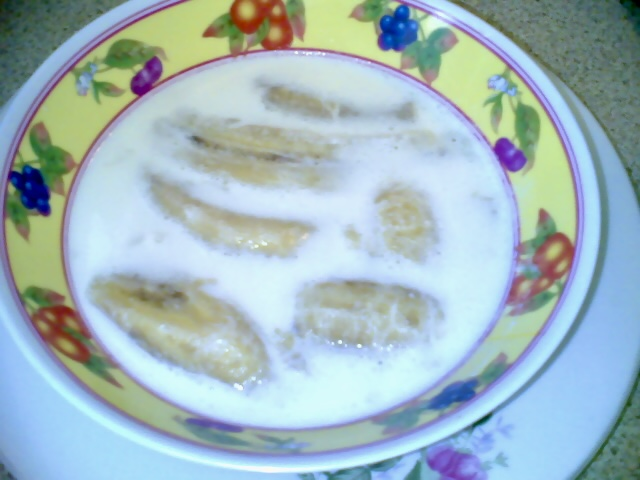
Mon banana pudding

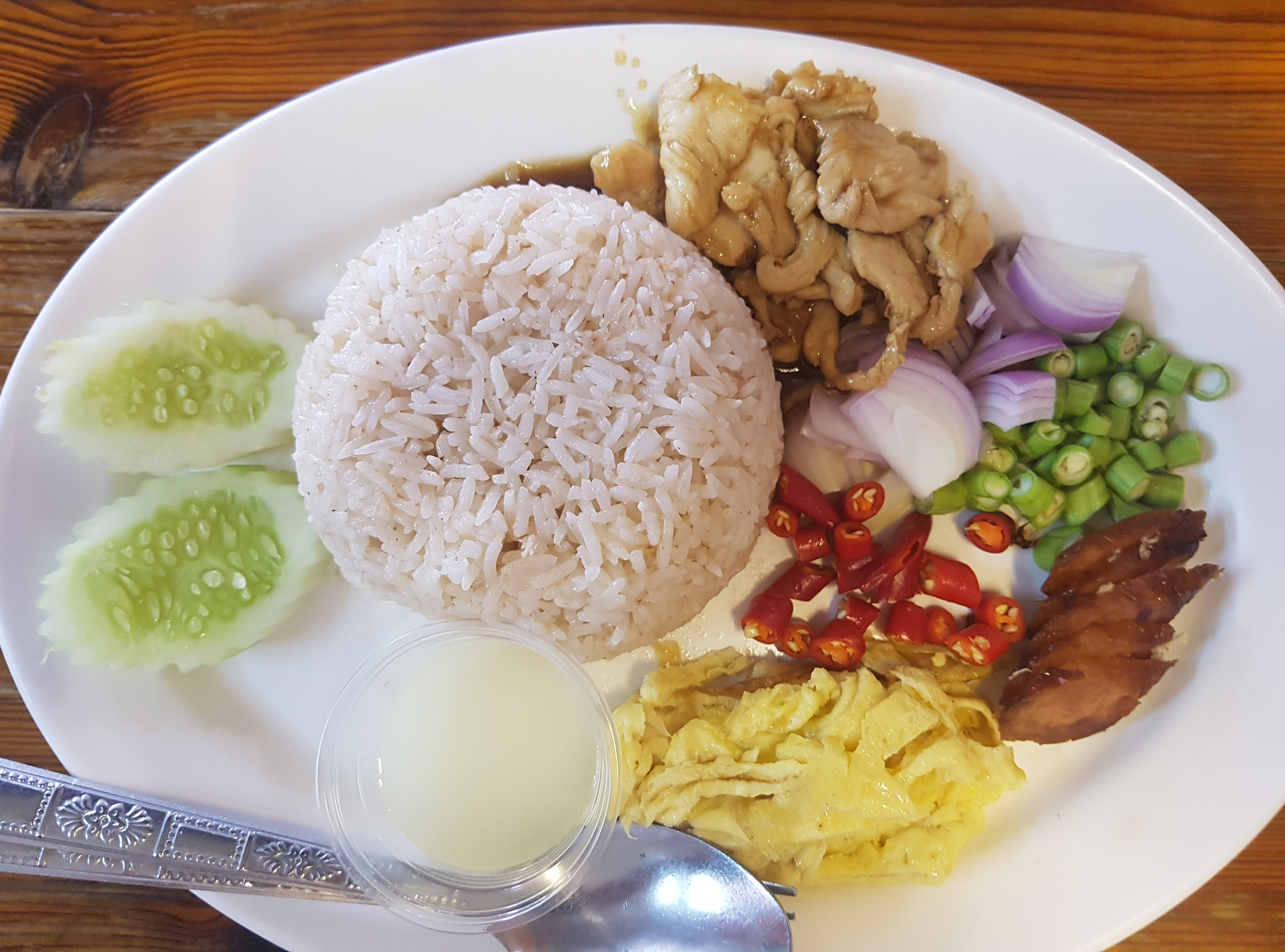
Mon inspired Khao Khluk Kapi dish

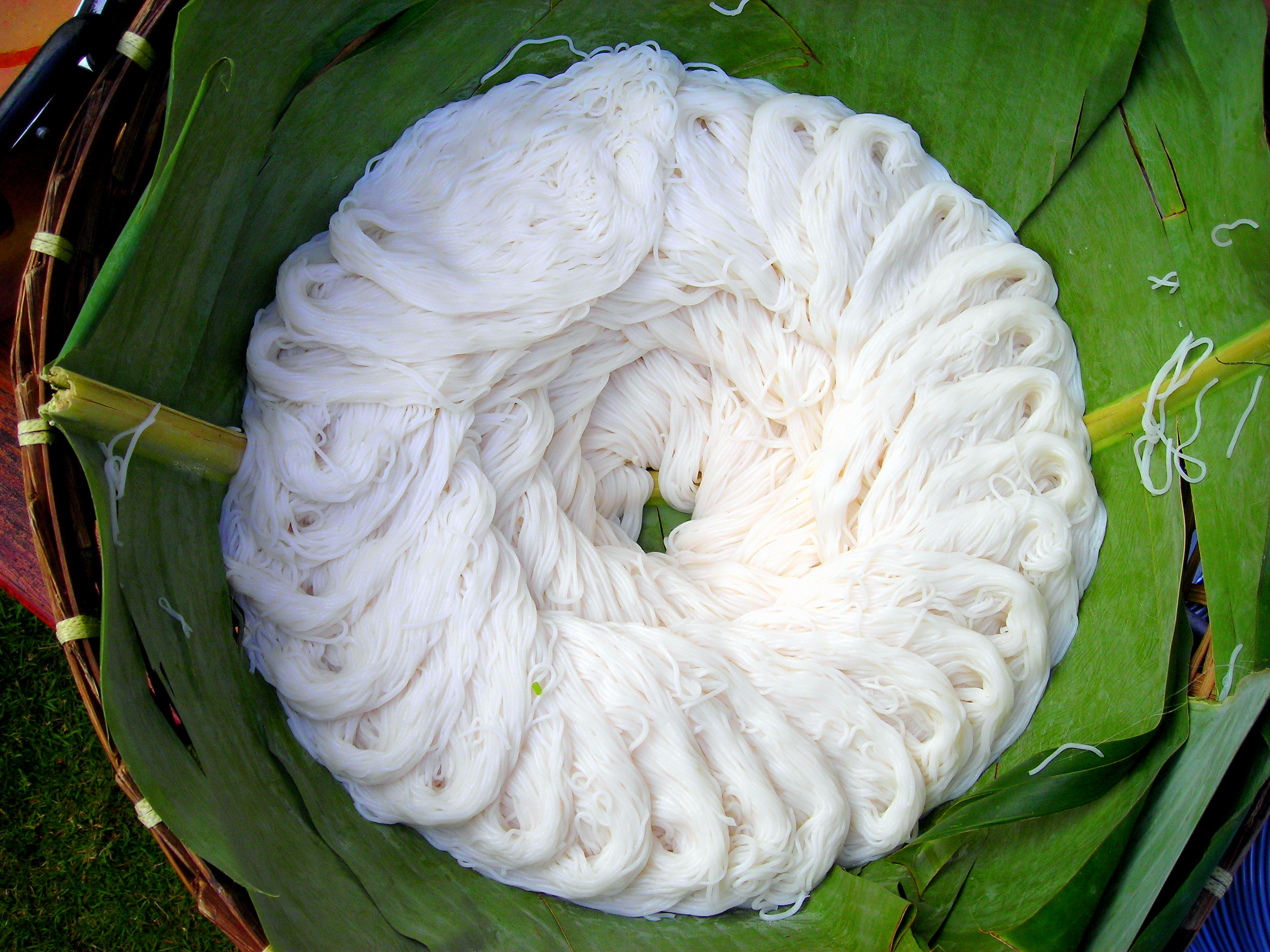
Khanom Chin rice noodles

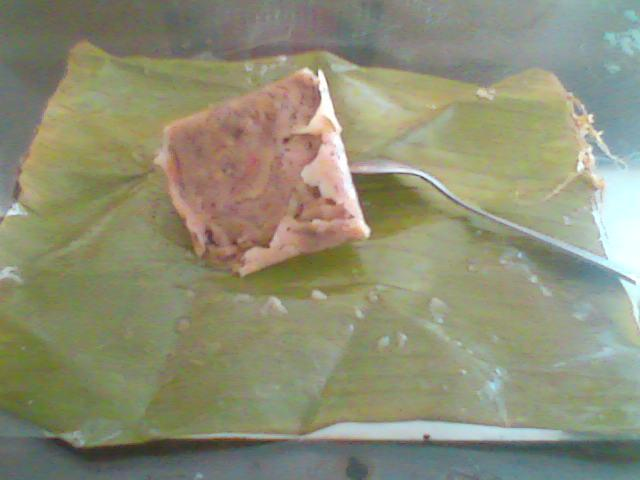
Nga baung thohk (steamed fish dish wrapped in banana leaves)

=== Folk games ===
Many games in both Myanmar and Thailand were Mon origins. Among them, Len Saba (lit. 'saba tossing game'; Mon: ဝိုင်မ်ဟနဂ်; Burmese: ဂုံညင်းဒိုး), Lor Kon Krok (Rolling a Mortar Bottom) and Mon Son Pa (Mon Hides a Cloth) are the most famous Mon traditional children games and are recognised as Intangible cultural heritage by UNESCO.

=== Recent discovery ===
Recent archaeological discoveries in Phitsanulok province, Thailand, have revealed two new sites named "Pha Pang Peuy," discovered in September 2025 in the Phu Khat Wildlife Sanctuary. These sites, found on a mountaintop, likely offer crucial evidence for studying the history and archaeology of the Mon people and their interactions in the region.

== Notable people ==
- Shin Arahan – primate who spread Theravada Buddhism in Bagan Kingdom and mainland Southeast Asia
- Wareru – founder of the Hanthawaddy kingdom and Wareru Dhammathat, the oldest extant legal treatises of Myanmar
- Shin Sawbu – the only female ruler in the recorded history of Burma (now Myanmar)
- Binnya Dala – Chief Minister-General responsible for the expansion of Toungoo Empire, the largest empire in the history of Southeast Asia
- Osoet Pegua – an influential businesswoman in the Ayutthaya Kingdom in the mid-17th century
- Taksin – founder of the Thonburi dynasty of Siam
- Rama I – founder of the reigning Chakri dynasty of Siam (now Thailand)
- Amarindra – Queen consort of King Rama I and mother of King Rama II
- Chulalongkorn (Rama V) – the fifth monarch of Chakri dynasty who modernised Thailand
- Debsirindra – Queen consort of Rama IV and mother of Chulalongkorn (Rama V)
- Shaw Loo – the father of western medicine in Myanmar and the first Myanmar in the U.S
- Sir J A Maung Gyi – Governor of British Burma
- Min Thu Wun – a pioneer of literary movement in the 1930s and father of President Htin Kyaw (2016– 2018)
- Apasra Hongsakula of Thailand – Miss Universe 1965
- Htoo Ein Thin – Myanmar pop singer
- Thongchai McIntyre – Thai singer and actor. Thailand's most famous superstar.
- Palmy – Thai pop singer
- Nandar Hlaing – Myanmar film actress
- Chintara Sukapatana – Thai film actress
- Natapohn Tameeruks – Thai film actress and model
- Srirasmi Suwadee – the third princess consort of then-Crown Prince Maha Vajiralongkorn (now Rama X) of Thailand
- Anand Panyarachun – Prime Minister of Thailand
- Myint Swe – Vice-President of Myanmar
- Lily Pantila Win – Thai film actress and model
- Thinzar Wint Kyaw – Myanmar film actress and model

== Gallery ==
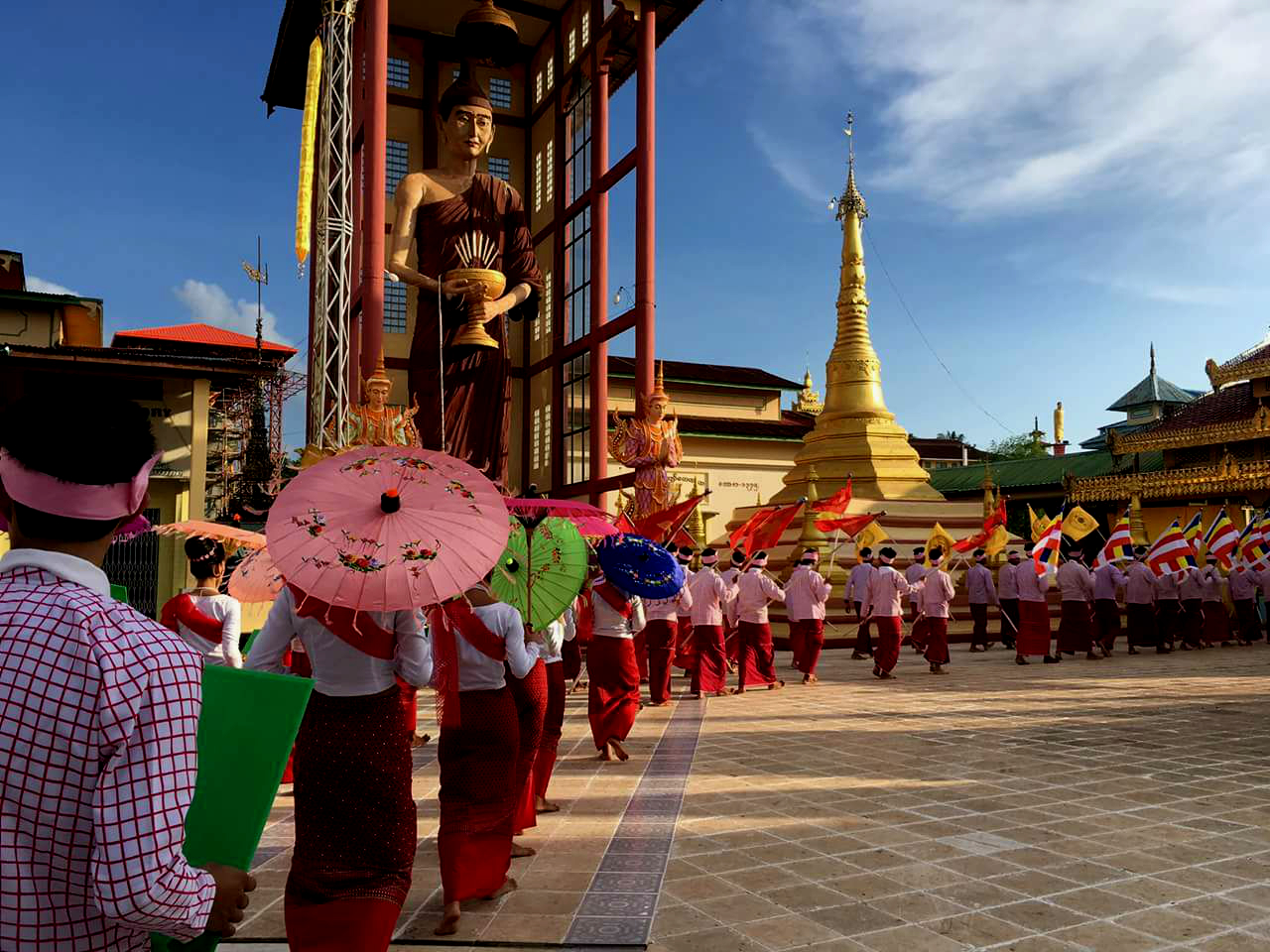
Mon people parade at Lamine Pagoda

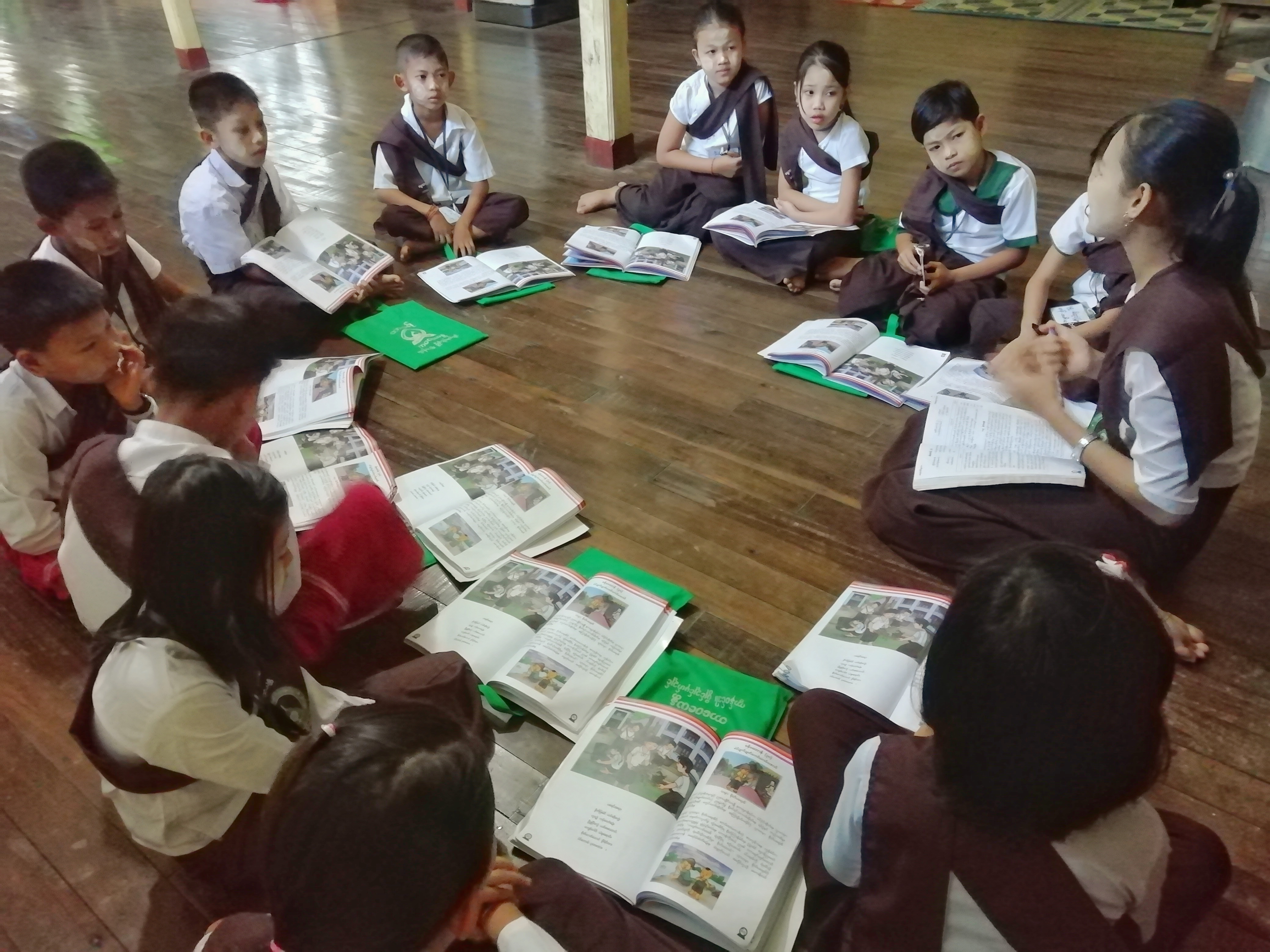
Mon Dharma School

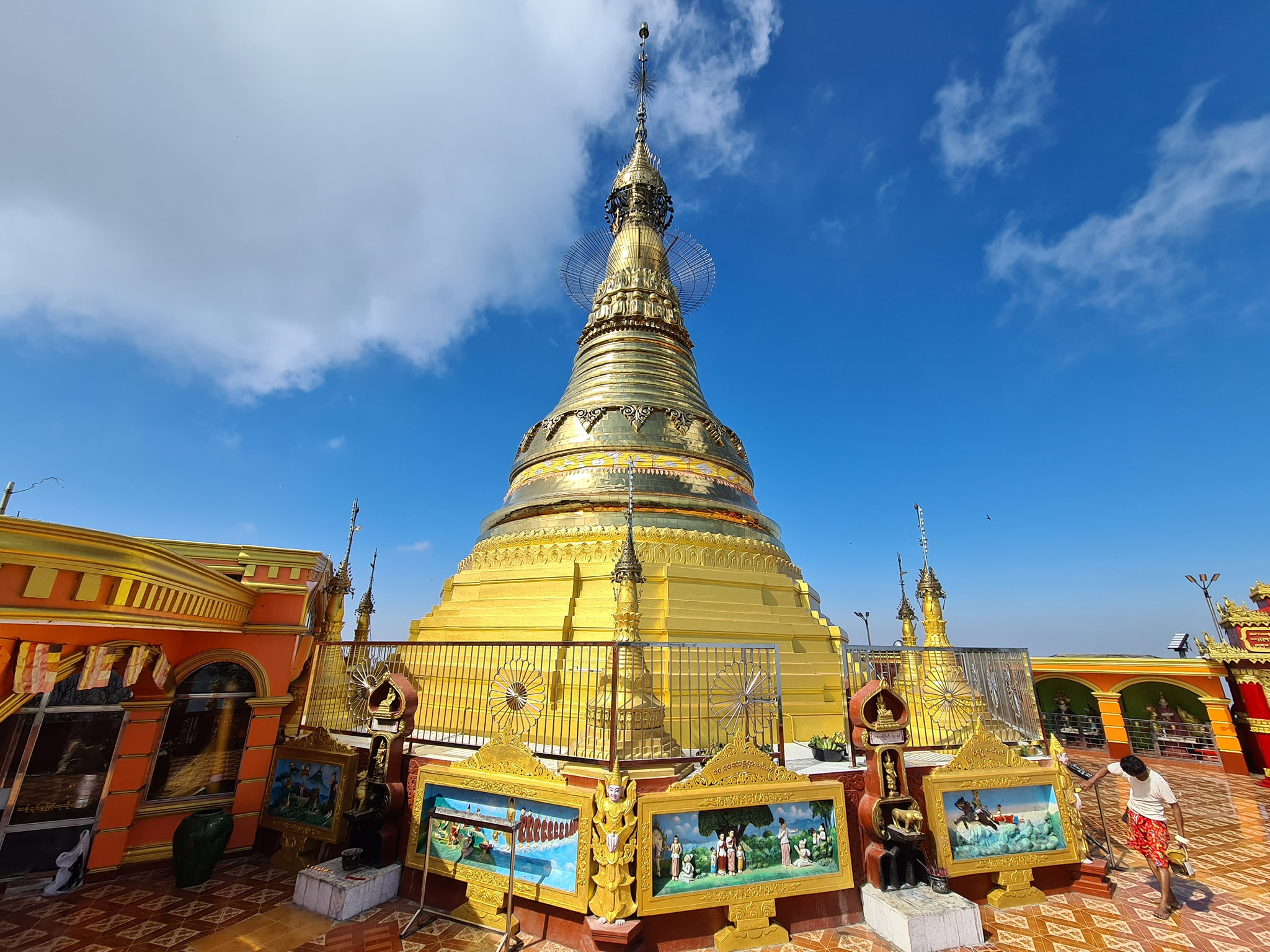
Zinkyaik Pagoda, An ancient Mon-style Stupa on the top of Zinkyaik Mountain, Mon State, Myanmar

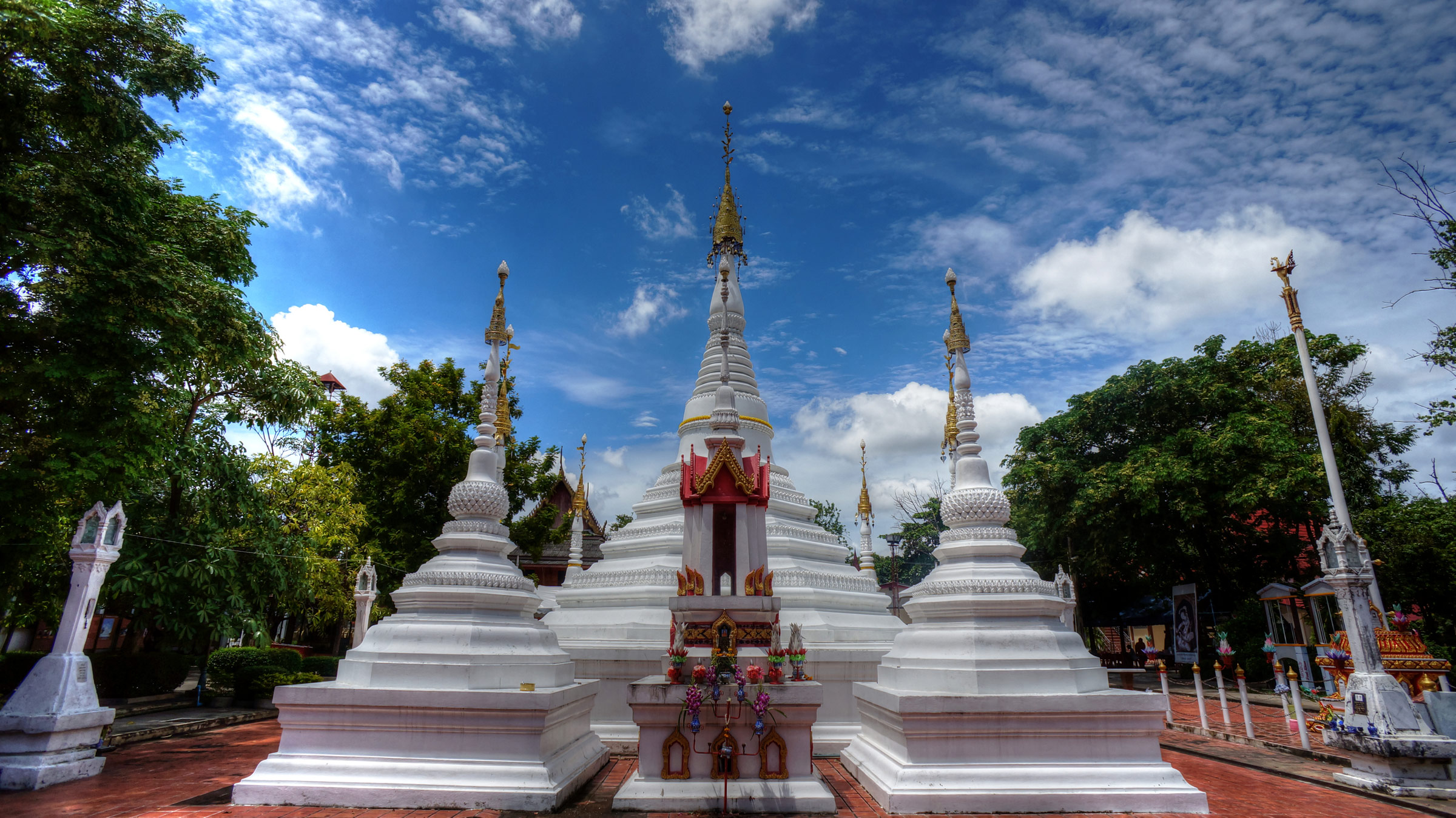
Mon Rattanakosin-style Stupa located at Wat Chomphuwek, Nonthaburi, Thailand

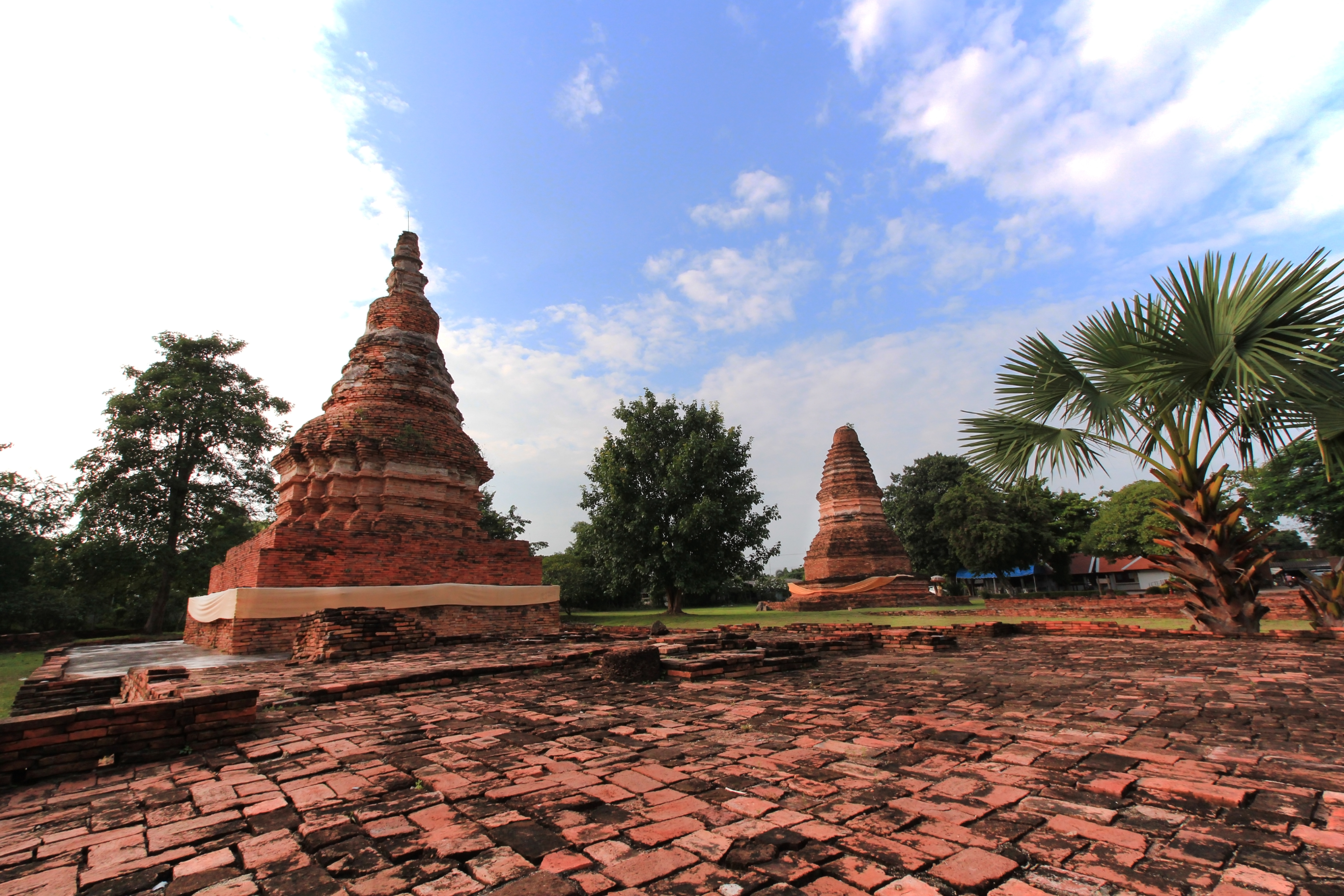
The remains of an ancient walled town of the Hariphunchai Kingdom, Wiang Tha Kan, founded approximately 1,000 years ago located in San Pa Tong District, Chiang Mai, Thailand.

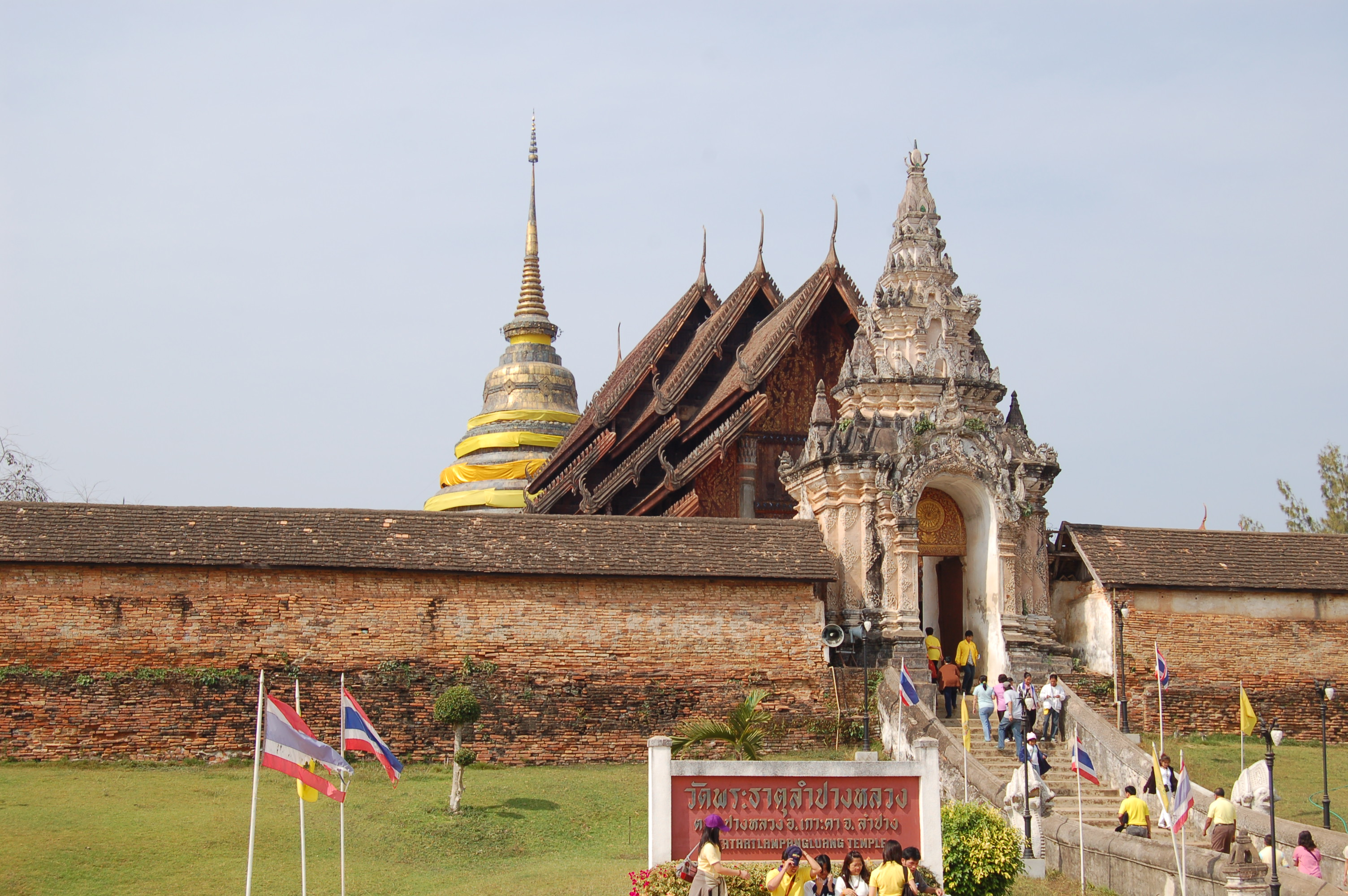
Mon Hariphunchai-style architecture located in Lampang, Thailand

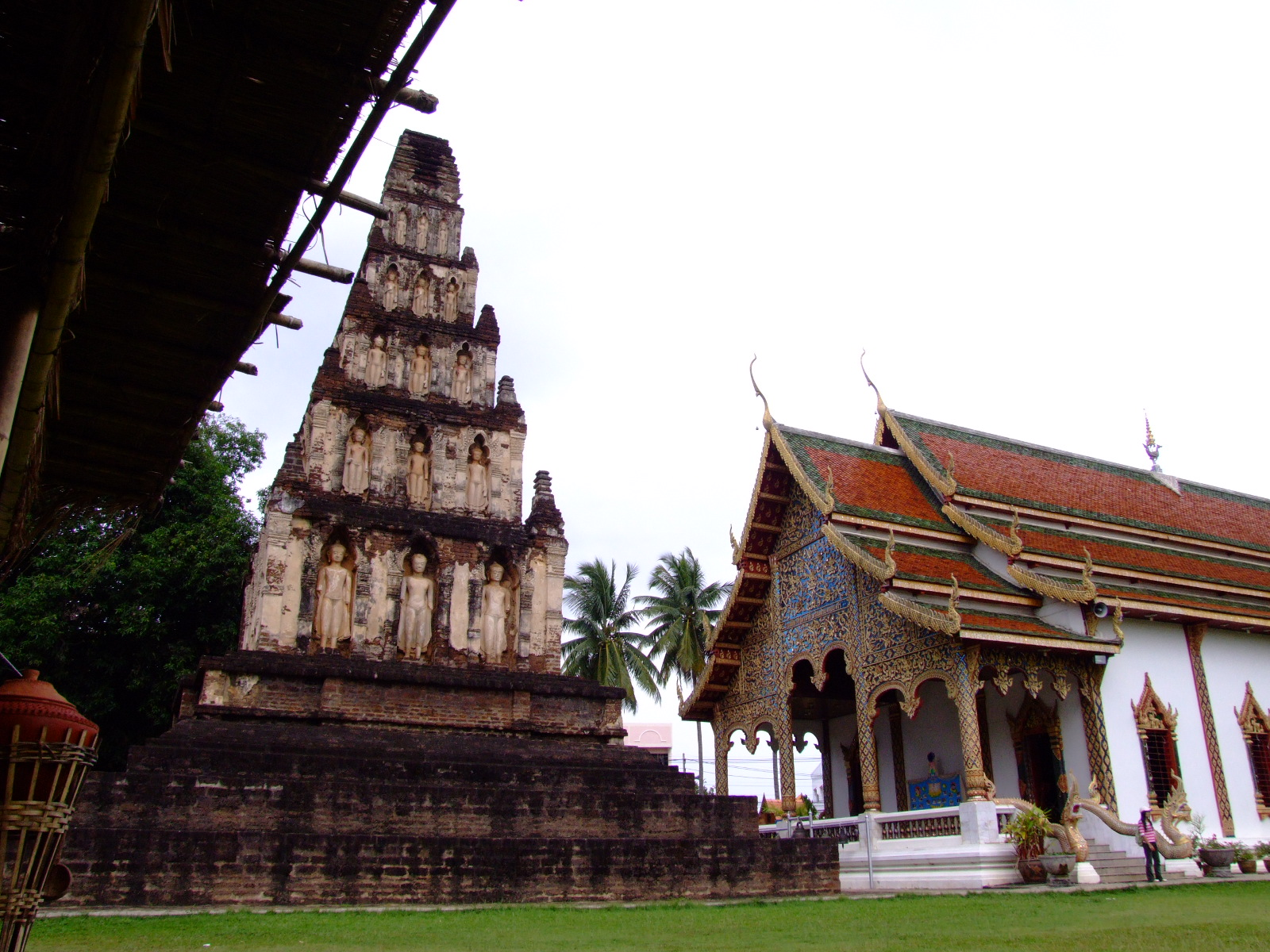
Mon Hariphunchai-style architecture located in Lamphun, Thailand

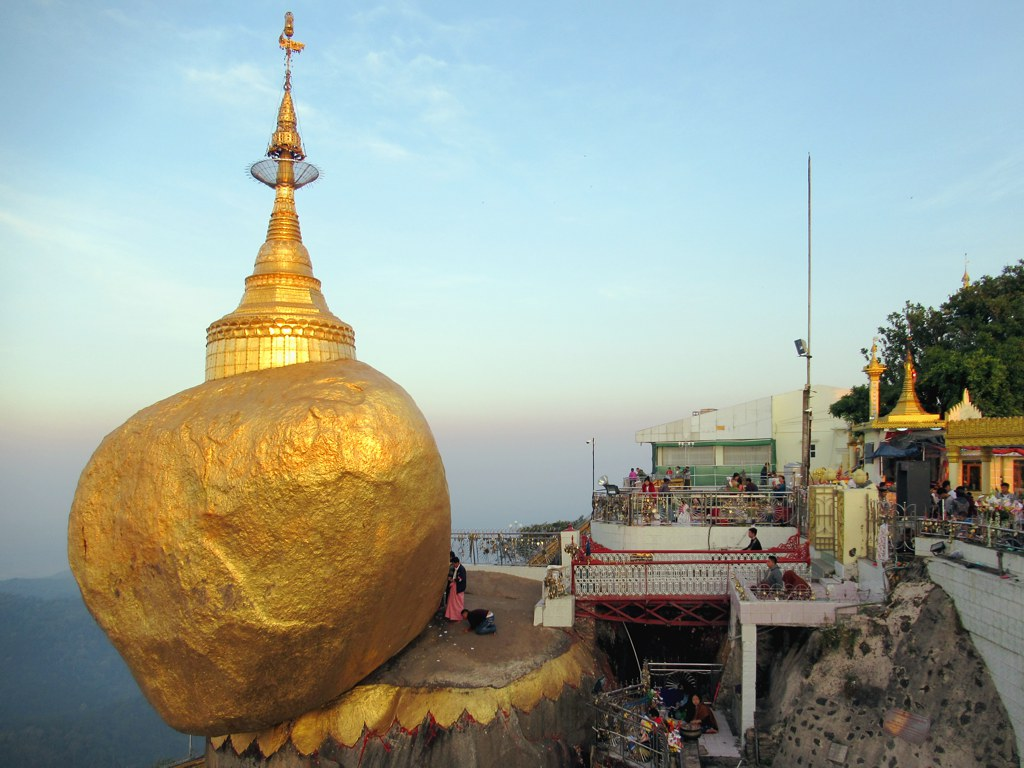
The Golden Rock Stupa located in Mon State, Myanmar

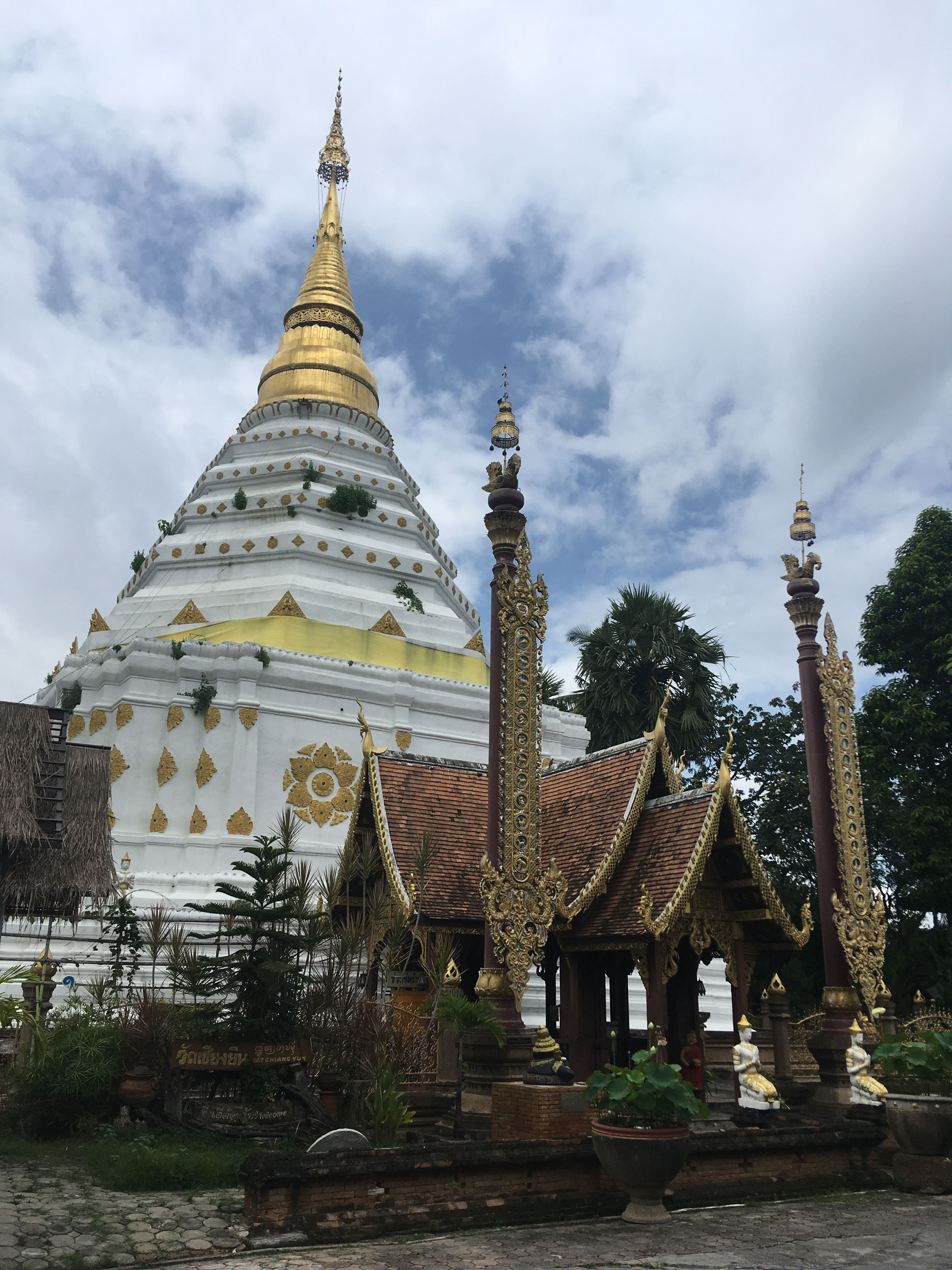
Hongsa pole with Centipede flag

== See also ==
- Hariphunchai
- Nyah Kur people
- List of Mon monarchs
- Prehistory of Myanmar
- Wat Chana Songkhram
- Wat Paramaiyikawat
- Si Kak Phraya Si
- Khlong Mon
- Mon State Cultural Museum
