= Sanphet =

Sanphet (Thai: สรรเพชญ, IPA: [sǎn.pʰét]; Sanskrit: सर्वज्ञ Sarvajña; "Omniscient", referring to the Buddha) was a Thai royal title. It may refer to:

- Kings of Ayutthaya:
  - Mahathammarachathirat (king of Ayutthaya) or Sanphet I (1509–1590)
  - Naresuan or Sanphet II (1555–1605)
  - Ekathotsarot or Sanphet III (died 1610)
  - Si Saowaphak or Sanphet IV (died 1620)
  - Prasat Thong or Sanphet V (died 1656)
  - Chai (king of Ayutthaya) or Sanphet VI (died 1656)
  - Si Suthammaracha or Sanphet VII (died 1656)
  - Suriyenthrathibodi or Sanphet VIII (died 1709)
  - Thai Sa or Sanphet IX (died 1733)
- Places in the Ayutthaya Historical Park
  - Wat Phra Si Sanphet, an ancient Buddhist temple
    - Phra Si Sanphet, a renowned Buddhist image
  - Sanphet Prasat, a royal hall
