= Baan Hollanda =

Former Dutch village in Thailand

Baan Hollanda บ้านฮอลันดา
- Museum Town
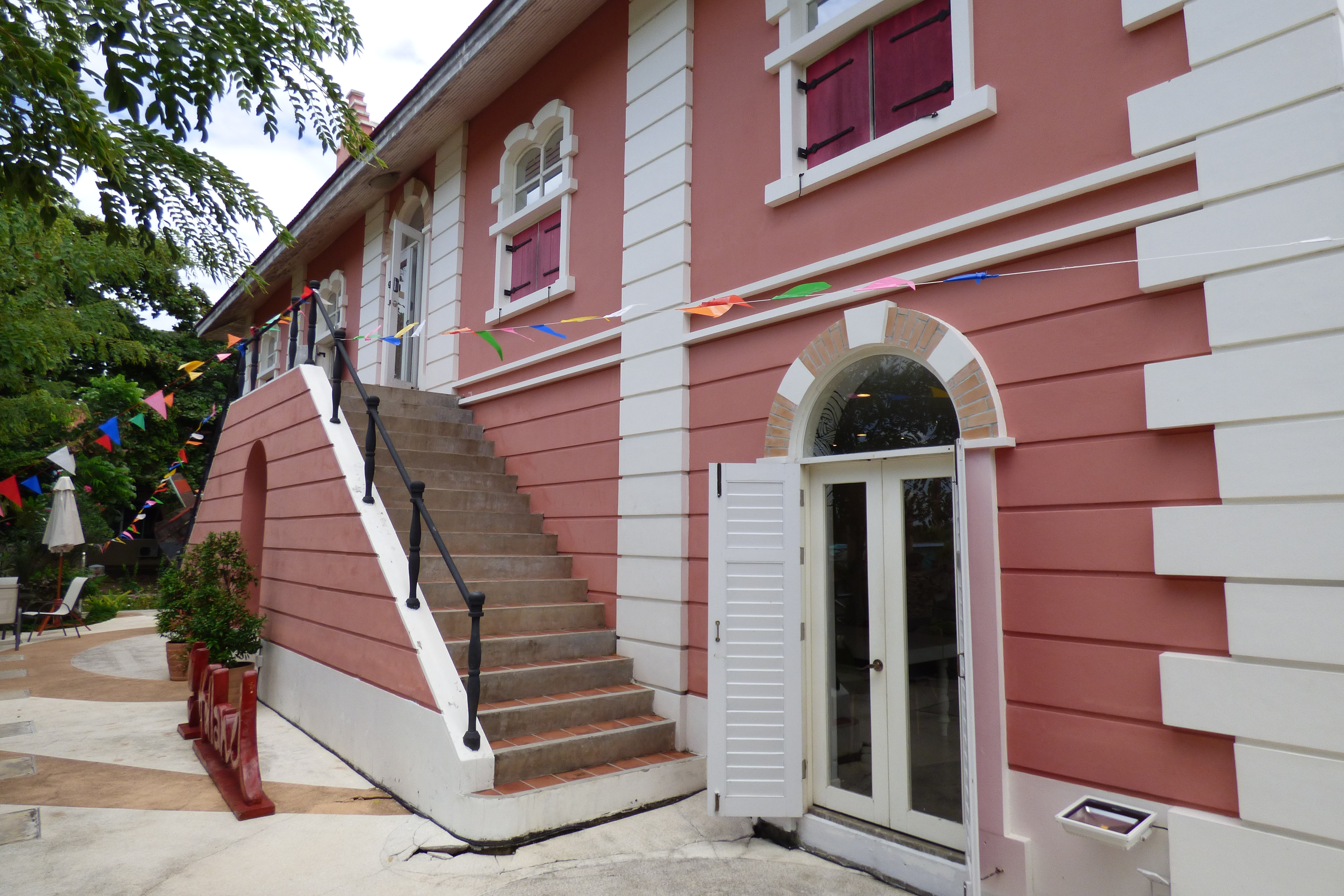
- In 2017

- Location of Baan Hollanda within Thailand
- Coordinates: 14°20′26″N 100°34′38″E
- Country: Thailand
- Province: Phra Nakhon Si Ayutthaya province
- District: Phra Nakhon Si Ayutthaya district
- Established: 1634

Population
  - Total: 0
- Time zone: UTC+07:00
- Website: https://baanhollanda.org/

Baan Hollanda (Thai: บ้านฮอลันดา) is a former Dutch trading settlement in Thailand, founded in 1643 during the Ayutthaya era. Situated on the Chao Phraya River, it lies in Phra Nakhon Si Ayutthaya District, Phra Nakhon Si Ayutthaya Province, near Ayutthaya Historical Park. It was established by the Dutch East India Company (VOC) and is now administered by the Fine Arts Department.

== Name ==
The term "Wilanda" was used by the Siamese in the past to mean those from the Netherlands, or the Dutch. It was derived from the Malay "Orang Belanda", used to denote the Dutch in Java and elsewhere in the East Indies. "Belanda" itself was possibly derived from the Portuguese "Hollanda" (Holland).

== History ==
The Dutch first established formal trade relations with Siam in 1604, towards the end of King Naresuan’s reign. In 1608, King Ekathotsarot granted permission to the Dutch East India Company (VOC) to open its trading post in Ayutthaya. The location was in the southern part of the walled island city and was a rather constricted space. Thus in 1634, during the reign of King Prasat Thong, a new VOC factory and trading office was built on land bestowed by the Siamese King as reward for Dutch naval aid in Ayutthaya's war against Pattani. This new more commodious piece of land was situated next to the Chao Phraya River outside the walled city. Here goods could be loaded and unloaded much more conveniently than before.

== Commemorations ==
In 2004, on the occasion of the 400th anniversary of relations between Thailand and the Netherlands, Queen Beatrix of the Netherlands, accompanied by Prince Willem-Alexander, Prince of Orange and Princess Maha Chakri Sirindhorn, visited the site of the Dutch settlement in Ayutthaya where the Fine Arts Department had been excavating the remains of the VOC lodge. Her Majesty graciously donated a sum of money towards the construction of an information centre, with a permanent exhibition, which may be considered a memorial of the long relations between the two countries.

=== EU Heritage Day ===
On September 15 and 16, 2018, Baan Hollanda was the site of EU Heritage Day celebrations in Thailand, which was attended by the Dutch ambassador to Thailand, Kees Pieter Rade, and the Governor of Phra Nakhon Si Ayutthaya province, Sujin Chaichumsak.

== See also ==
- Holland
- Netherlands–Thailand relations
- Nanban trade
- List of Jesuit sites
- Nagasaki foreign settlement
- Dejima, former Dutch quarter at the port of Nagasaki, Japan
- Thirteen Factories, a former area of Guangzhou, China, where the first foreign trade was allowed in the 18th century since the hai jin (海禁) ban on maritime activities.
