= Kap Maha Chat =

The Kap Maha Chat (Thai: กาพย์มหาชาติ, pronounced [kàːp mā.hǎː t͡ɕʰâːt]) is an old work of literature composed in Siam in the Ayuthian period. There is no mention of the name of its author and its history remains unclear. However, it is held as a work of both literary and religious value.

== History ==
Prince Damrong postulated that the Kap Maha Chat was likely composed during the reign of King Songtham at a joint convention of philosophers and royal academicians between the years 1602 and 1627.

== Content, language, style ==
The content of the Kap Maha Chat is a rhymed narrative composition retelling the story of Maha Chat or Vessantara Jataka (มหาเวสสันดรชาดก, Maha Wetsandon Chadok) in a style known as yok gathā (ยกคาถา, yok katha), which is the incantation a sentence or phrase in Pāḷi and then retelling it in Thai. The entire tale being told from start to finish by alternating between the two languages. Verse is in a style known as rai boran, at the time referred to as rai maha chat (ร่ายมหาชาติ). Aside from being simply prosework composed to give sermons on the Maha Chat itself, each chapter (known as a bap (บรรพ) when referring to the Maha Chat) is in fact quite concise so that it could be directed at an audience of average layfolk. The Thai prefix kap of the title can be glossed as 'narrative poem'.

== Examples ==
From the chapter Wanaprawet (วนประเวศน์); words in bold are in Pali:

เต จัต์ตาโร ขัต์ติยา อันว่าพระบรมกษัตริย์ทั้งสี่ศรีสุริยวงศ์ เมื่อเสด็จบทจรประสงค์สู่เขาคิริยวงกฏ มิได้แจ้งทางที่กำหนดดำเนินไพร ด้วยความเข็ญใจก็จำเป็น ปติปเถ ทอดพระเนตรเห็นมหาชน อันเดินทวนทางถนนนั้นมา ก็ตรัสถามถึงมรคาเขาคันธมาทน์ ..."
