= Netherlands–Thailand relations =

- Netherlands: Thailand

Diplomatic mission
- Embassy of the Netherlands, Bangkok: Royal Thai Embassy, The Hague

Envoy
- Remco van Wijngaarden: Chatri Archjananun

Bilateral relations between the Netherlands and Thailand date back to 1604, as one of the earliest interactions between Europeans and Siamese. In the mid-17th century, the Dutch East India Company (VOC) was trying to expand its commercial dominance over Southeast Asia from its fortified capital for the Dutch colonial empire in Batavia (present day Jakarta) as the Dutch East Indies (modern day Indonesia). Meanwhile, the Siamese capital of Ayutthaya was a thriving international trade hub. Thailand today is a popular tourist site for Dutch tourists, while the Netherlands is the largest EU investor in Thailand. The Netherlands operates an embassy in Bangkok, as well as a consulate in Phuket. Thailand itself operates an embassy in the Hague, as well as a consulate in Amsterdam.

== History ==
=== Origins ===
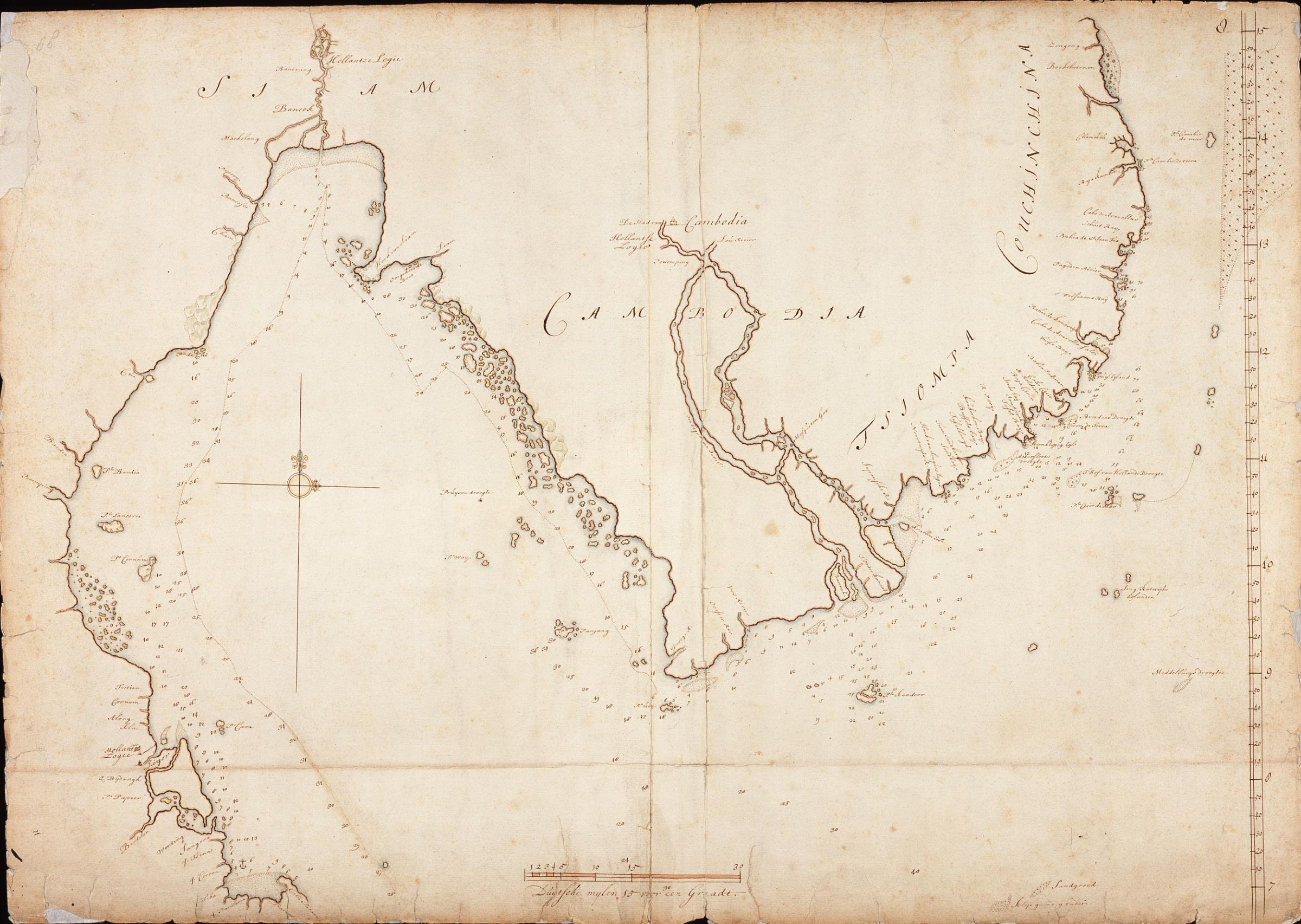
Map of Thailand and Cambodia by Isaak de Graaf

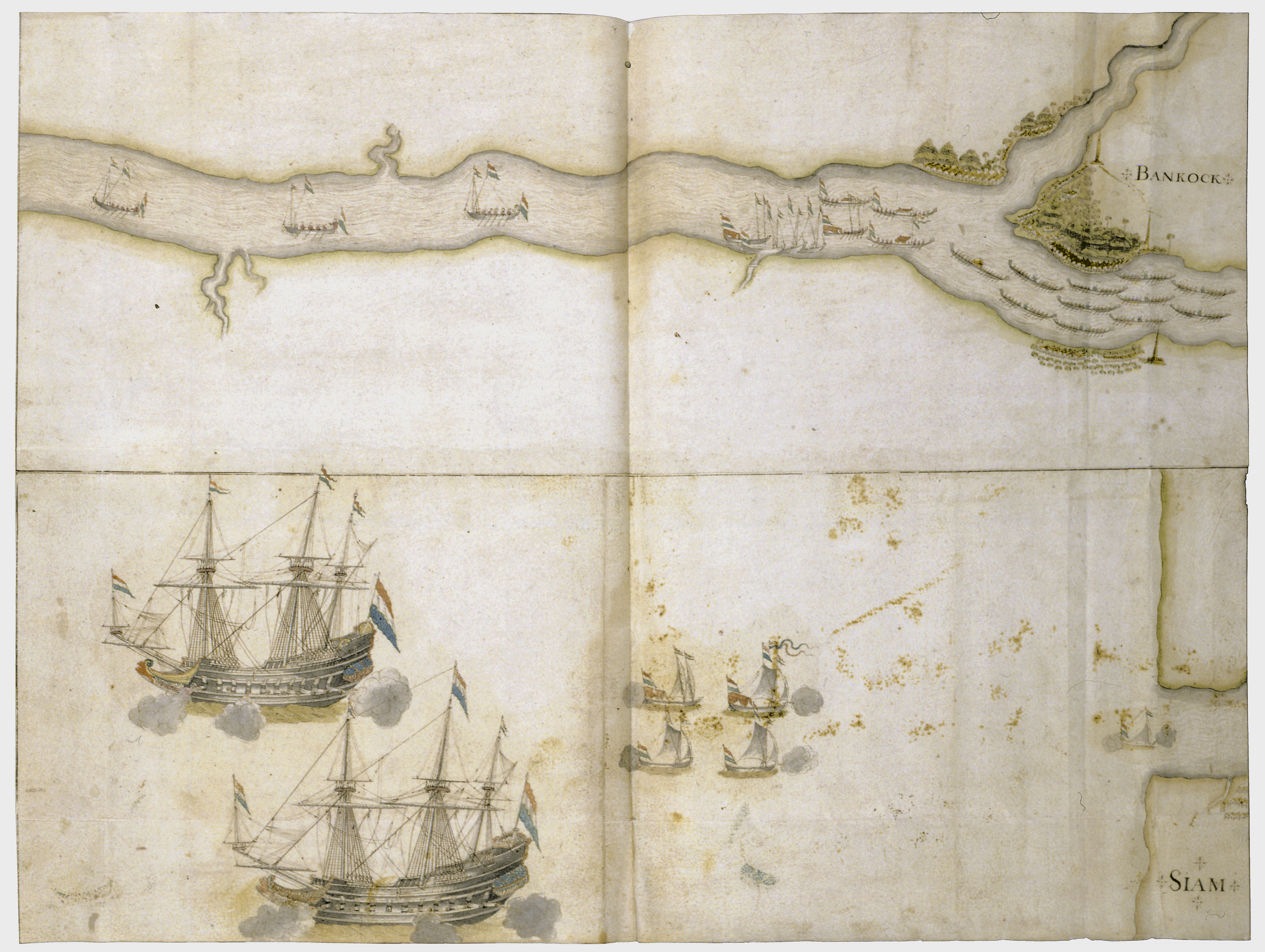
Dutch East India Company merchant ships to Bangkok c1635

In 1601, Jacob Corneliszoon van Neck became the first Dutch person to land in modern-day Thailand when he landed in Pattani, which was an independent sultanate. In December 1602, Pattani was visited again by two more ships owned by the Dutch East India Company (VOC). The Dutch would later establish a comptior (trading post) in Songkhla and Pattani in 1607. In 1608, King Ekathotsarot of Ayutthaya gave permission for the VOC to establish a trading post in the capital city of Ayutthaya. Siamese ambassadors were later sent to the Dutch Republic and were given an audience by the Prince of Orange, Maurice. However, the posts in Songkhla and Pattani were abandoned around 1623 by the governor-general of the Dutch East Indies, Jan Pieterszoon Coen. In 1617, both countries signed a treaty. In 1619, the Dutch colonized Java and founded Batavia (now Jakarta) and made it to their Asian headquarters. However the Dutch post at Ayutthaya proved to be unprofitable and was closed in 1622, but due to fears of losing their position in Siam, it was reopened again in 1624 before being closed again in 1629.

During the early reign of King Prasat Thong, the Dutch supported Prasat against his rivals, including Japanese mercenaries led by Yamada Nagamasa, and against the Cambodians. After Japan lifted its ban on foreign trade, the Dutch began making more investments into Siam and its exports of dear hides, sappanwood, and ray skins. Later in April 1633, Joost Schouten was instructed to construct a new trading post in Ayutthaya which costed about US$750,000 today and was completed in 1634 at Baan Holllanda. Due to it being made of stone, the building gained high-status in Ayutthaya as stone was only used in Ayutthaya to build temples and palaces. It was constructed on the opposite side of the Chao Phraya river to the Portuguese and Japanese. In 1634, the Sultanate of Pattani rebelled against Siamese rule. In return for the exclusive right to export animal skin from Siam, the Dutch promised to assist Prasat Thong with six Dutch vessels. The Siamese, however, didn't wait for the Dutch to arrive and were repelled from Pattani to Songkhla. The Dutch later arrived in Pattani after the Siamese retreat.

=== Trade with Siam ===
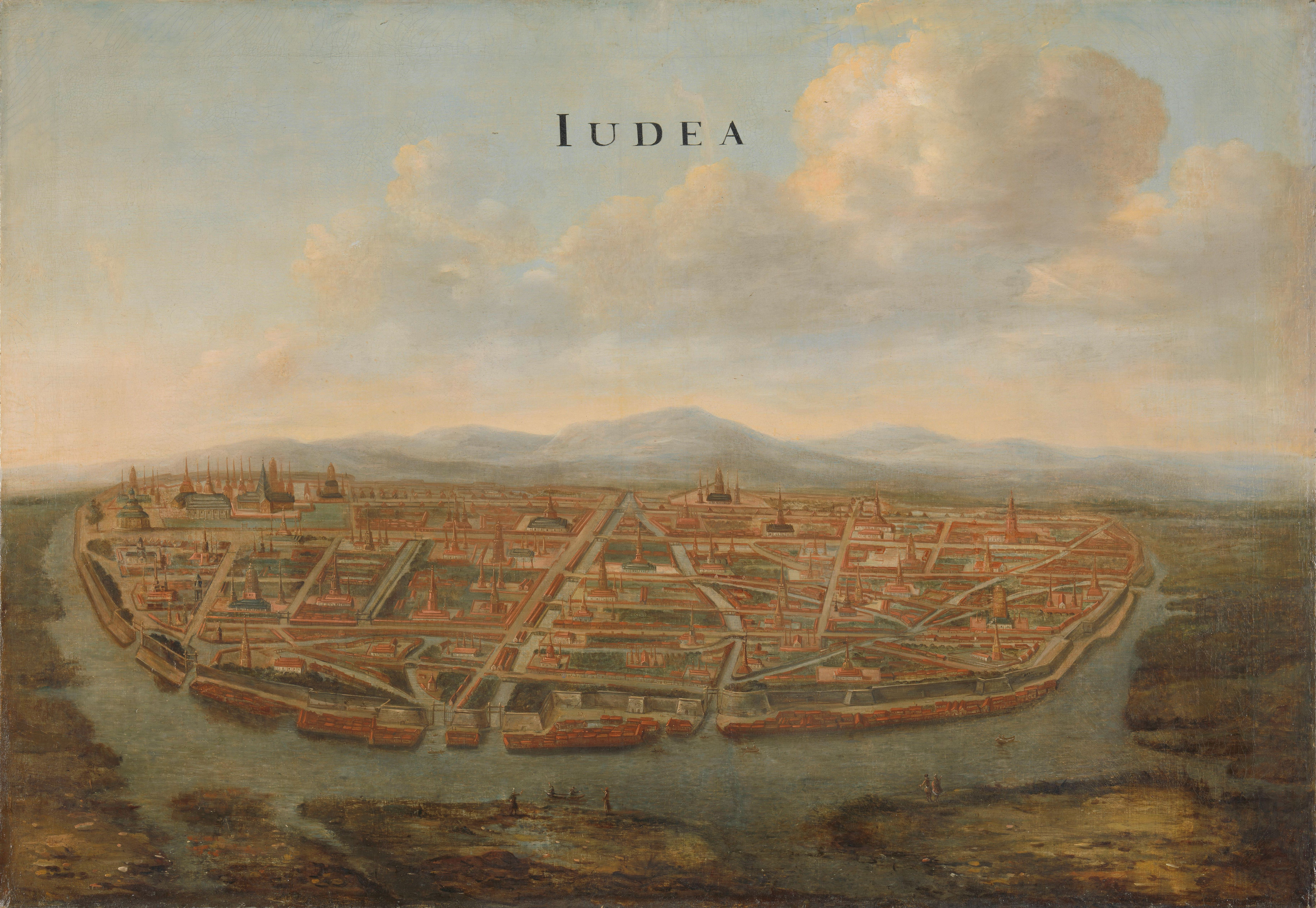
Dutch depiction of Ayutthaya by Johannes Vingboon during 1622-1623. The city is named Iudea

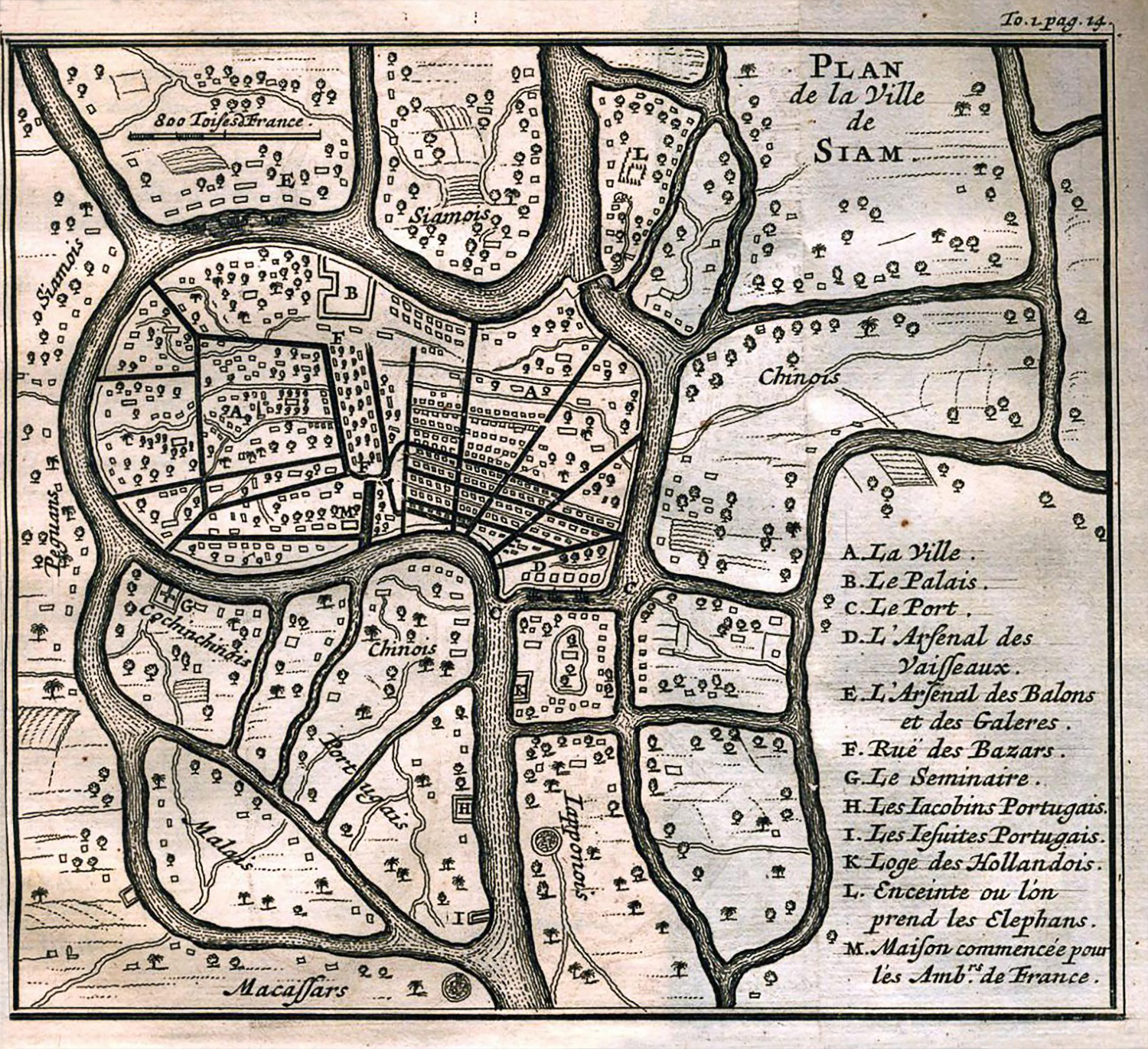
The Dutch lodge in Ayutthaya is at the lower center ("Hollandois") of the map, 1691

In 1636, the Dutch established a second post at the mouth of the Chao Phraya river, on the west bank at Samut Prakan called 'Amsterdam' which operated as a warehouse. On 10 December 1636, two Dutch VOC workers were attacked by Palace Guards at Ayutthaya. On the 11th, the two were convicted of attacking the palace of Prasat Thong's brother and were sentenced to death by elephant trampling. However, the VOC chief at Ayutthaya, Jeremias van Vliet, managed to secure their release but was forced to take responsibility for all Dutch people in Siam in the future. In 1640, the VOC established another trading post at Nakhon Sri Thammarat until its closure in 1663. It was reopened again in 1707 before being permanently abandoned in 1756.

Han Chinese merchants were a major rival of the Dutch in colonial Indonesia. Han Chinese interpreters advised the local Muslim king of Jambi to go to war against the Dutch, while the Dutch attacked Chinese ships and Thai ships to stop them from trading with the Muslims in Jambi and make them trade with the Dutch in Batavia. The Chinese continued to violate the Dutch ban on trade with Jambi. The Dutch East India Company was also angered by Thailand trading with the Jambi Sultanate and the Jambi Sultanate sending pepper and flowers as tribute to Thailand. leading to tensions between Thailand the Dutch in 1663—1664 and 1680—1685. The Dutch wanted Chinese banned from Thai junks and were angry when a Thai ambassador in Iran took out a loan from the Dutch in Surat but didn't pay it back after his ship got repaired. The 1682 Dutch invasion of Banten (Bantam) in Indonesia also raised alarms in Thailand, so the Thai King Narai courted the French to counter the Dutch. Dutch East India Company attacked Zheng Zhilong's junks which were trading pepper with Jambi, but while the Dutch transferred 32 Chinese prisoners into the Dutch ship, the remaining Chinese managed to slaughter the 13 Dutch sailors on board the Chinese junk and retake the vessel. Zheng Zhilong demanded the Dutch then release the 32 Chinese in 1636. Dutch East India Company blockaded Thai trade in 1664 and in 1661—1662 seized a Thai junk owned by a Persian official in Thailand. The Dutch tried to impede Thai and Chinese competition with the Dutch in the pepper trade at Jambi. The Jambi Sultan temporarily jailed English merchants during violence between the Dutch and English. The Thai and Jambi Sultanate angrily complained against the Dutch over Dutch attacks and attempts to impede Jambi's trade with Chinese and Thai. Chinese junks regularly traded with Jambi, Patani, Siam and Cambodia.

In 1649, the VOC forwarded a claim to the Siamese government which Prasat Thong refused to accept, which was met by Jeremais van Vielt with anger. As a result, Prasat Thong ordered the execution of every Dutch person in Siam and the Dutch at the post in Ayutthaya were arrested. In the end, Prasat Thong reversed his decision. Relations continued to deteriorate when in 1662, King Narai imposed a royal monopoly over all trade in Siam, causing the Dutch to lose their monopoly over animal hides. In 1663, it was discovered that the Portuguese were violating the 1617 treaty and Narai ordered the closure of Ayutthaya. By September 1663, the VOC sent three ships to blockade the Chao Phraya river and demanded the release of their men and merchandise. In an attempt to improve Siam's relation with the Dutch, Narai sent an envoy to the Netherlands. Then on 21 June 1664, Pieter De Bitter sent an envoy to Siam who managed to renew the Dutch-Siamese treaty on 22 August 1664. As a result, the Dutch regained their monopoly over animal hides. The treaty also stated that Dutch people in Siam would be punished according to the laws of the Netherlands. However, King Narai hoped to curb Dutch influence over Siam by forming new relations with other Europeans, such as the French. The VOC post in Ayutthaya was restored in 1625. Yet in 1688, the French left Siam and the Dutch - who remained the only European power in Siam - signed a new treaty which secured their monopoly over animal hides and tin.

Due to Japan's growing isolation, the importance of animal skin in Ayutthaya disappeared and also due to tin being cheaper in Palembang, the Dutch post in Nakhron Sri Thammarat was closed in 1740, and by the 1750s, Dutch trade with Siam dwindled. Furthermore, King Borommakot refused to renewal treaties with the VOC and ignored the VOC's ultimnation. But from 1752 to 1756, the post at Nakhron Sri Thammarat reopened for the Japanese market but was closed again as the VOC focused on their East Indies holdings. In 1760, the Burmese attacked Ayutthaya and plundered the VOC post, resulting in the death of one Dutchman. By November 1765, the last VOC ship left Ayutthaya. When the Burmese captured Bangkok in August 1766, the VOC in Siam led by Werndlij decided to evacuate the company and its men from Siam, and in December 1766 the Burmese captured the Dutch post.

=== World War II ===
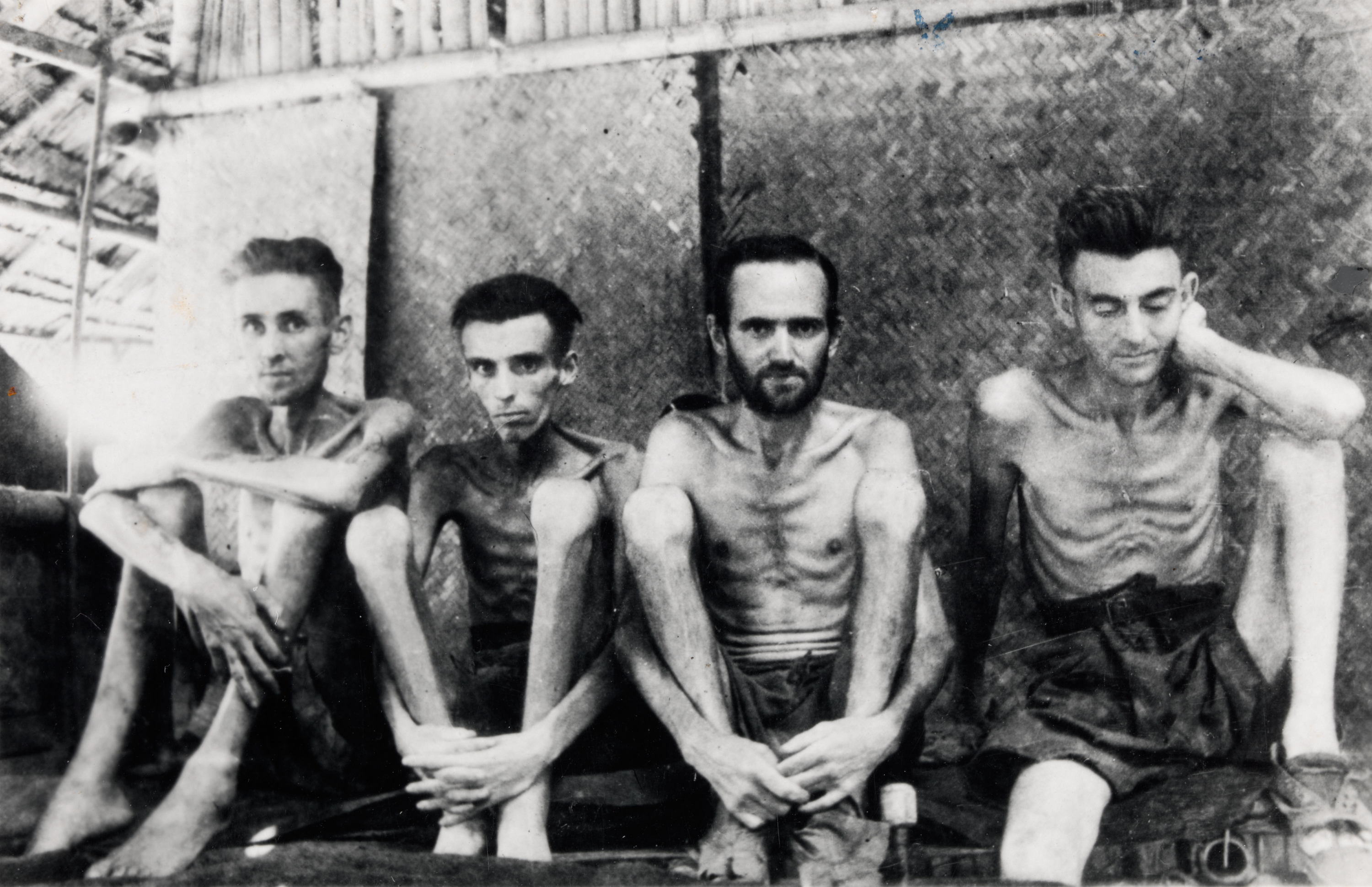
Australian and Dutch POWs in Thailand, 1943

Following the Japanese invasions of Thailand and the East Indies, the Japanese began constructing the Burma Railway which were constructed by Allied POWs, including Dutch POWs. After the British, the Dutch were the largest POW contingent working on the railway. A majority of the Dutch POWs had previously been Dutch civilians or had been employed in the Royal Netherlands East Indies army. The construction of the Burma railways would result in the death of 3,000 Dutch POWs. The bodies of dead Dutchmen were later reburied in war cemeteries, such as the Kanchanaburi War Cemetery where at least 1,896 Dutch are buried along with Australians and British dead. On May 4 every year, the Dutch anthem is played at Kanchanaburi War Cemetery before wreaths are laid on behalf of the Dutch Ministry of Defence and veterans.

== Economy and trade ==
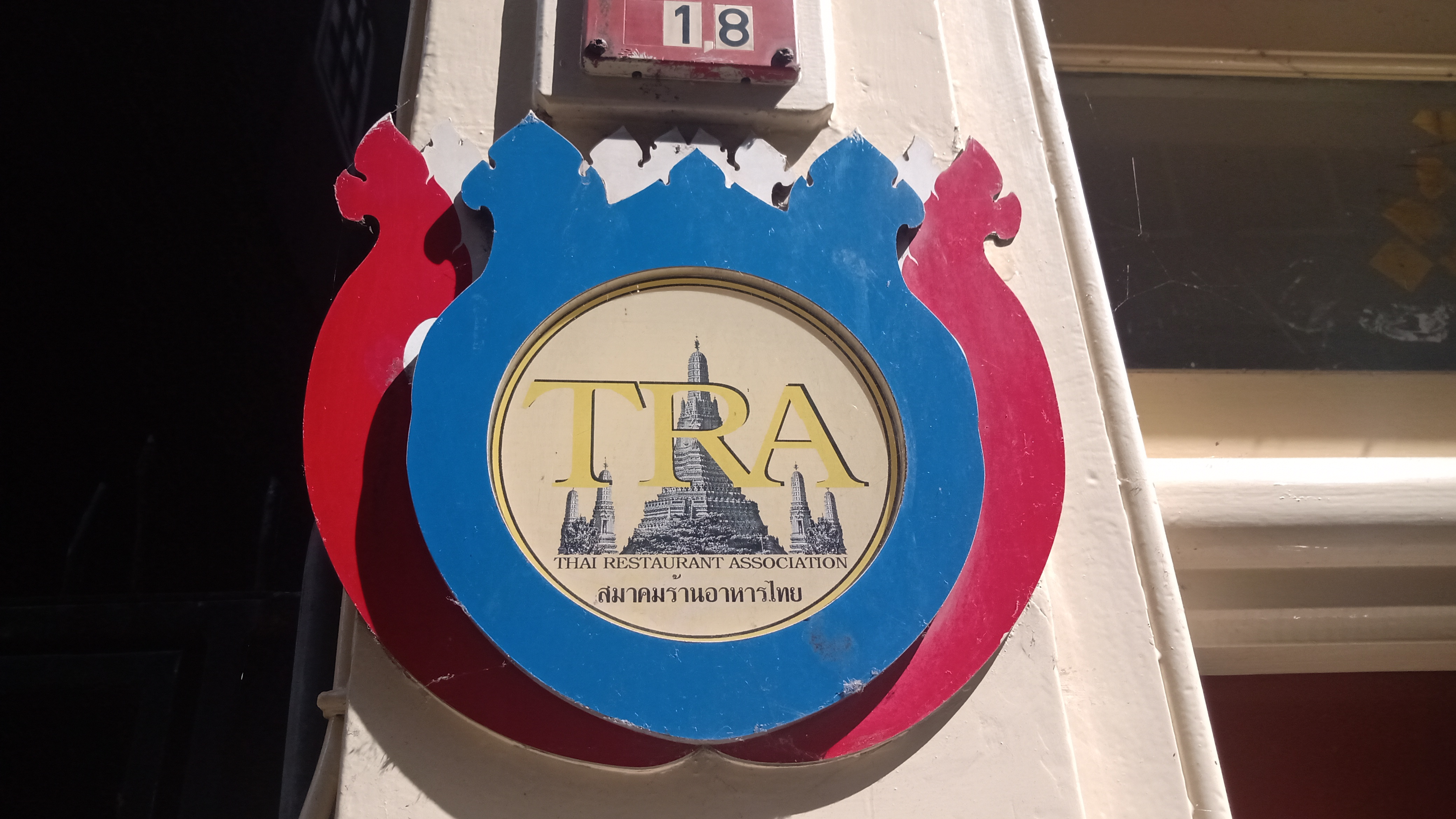
Thai Restaurant Association sign in Amsterdam

The Netherlands is the largest European investor in Thailand and the 5th largest investor globally. At the end of the third quarter of 2022, direct investment from the Netherlands to Thailand was valued US$16.8 million and counted for 6.2% of all direct investment in Thailand.

Thailand is also the second largest destination for Dutch merchandise being exported to ASEAN, after Singapore. The value of merchandise trade between the two was valued in 2022 at 5.7 billion euros, a 12.5% increase from 2021, while Dutch exports to Thailand grew to 1.4 billion euros, a 14.8% increase. In the Netherlands, imports from Thailand grew to 4.3 billion, 11.8% more than 2021. Thai imports of Dutch goods consisted mainly of electronic circuits, chemicals, machinery, scientific tools, dairy and animal products. In contrast, Thai exports of goods to the Netherlands were mainly computer parts, printer and telephone sets, electrical equipment, electronic circuits, poultry and rubber products. Similarly, Dutch service exports to Thailand include technical, business, professional, and transport services and the use of intellectual property. These services amounted to 569 million euros in 2022. For Thailand, services exported to the Netherlands were mainly travel, transportation, professional, and management consultant services; which together amounted to 312 million euros.

The Netherlands particularly supports Thailand with agriculture and water management, with both countries being vulnerable to flooding and Climate Change.

== Tourism and transportation ==
KLM Royal Dutch Airlines and EVA Air currently operates direct flight routes between Amsterdam and Suvarnabhumi airport. Before the COVID-19 pandemic, 200,000-250,000 Dutch tourists visited Thailand.Thai Airways previously operated flights from Donmuang Airport in Bangkok to Amsterdam and Suvarnabhumi airport to Amsterdam

== State and official visits ==
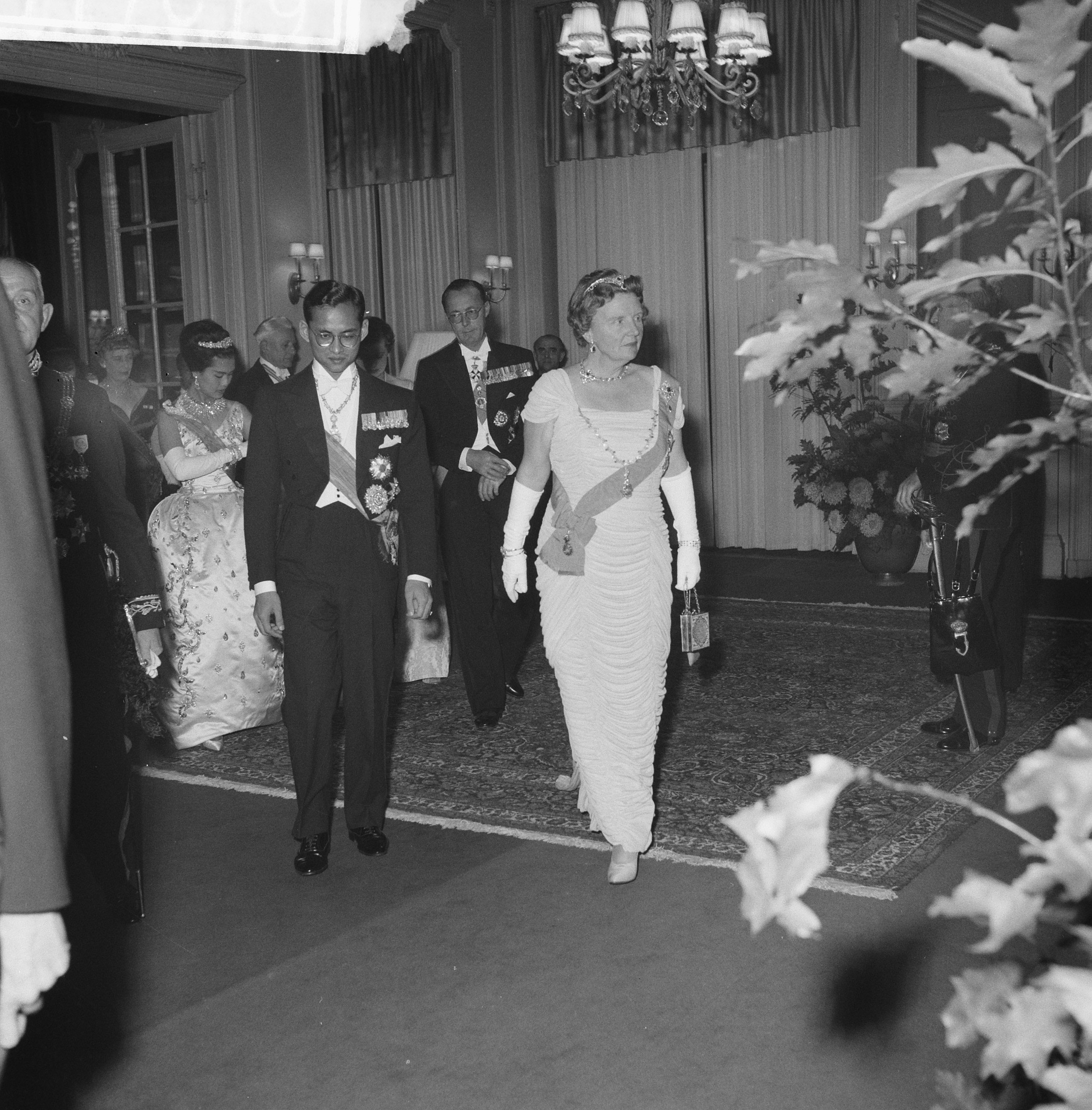
King Bhumibol with Prince Bernhard and Queen Juliana in 1960

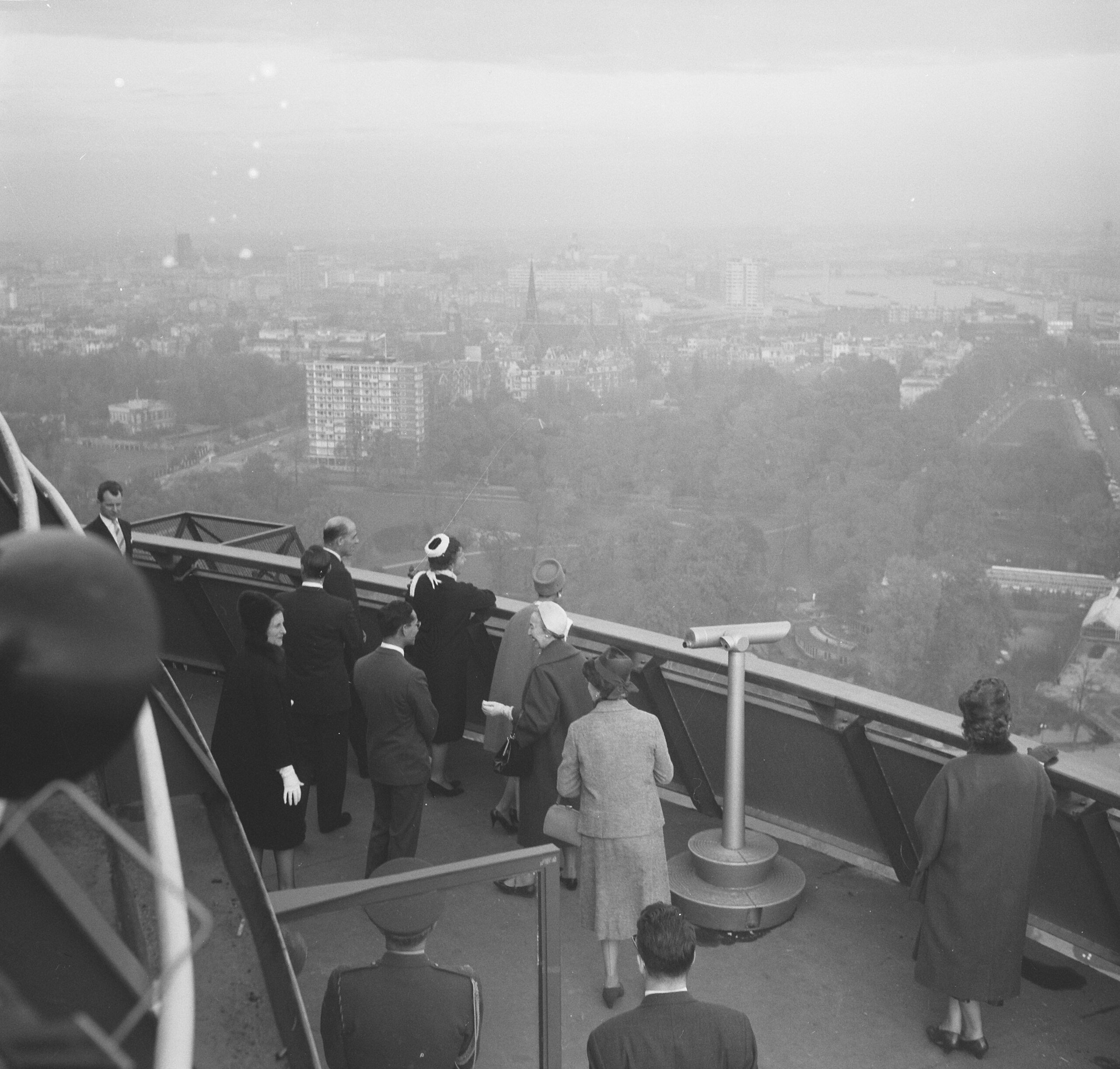
King Bhumibol in Rotterdam, 1960

State and official visits to the Netherlands by a Thai royal
Dates	People	Locations	Itinerary
6–9 September 1897	King Chulalongkorn, Prince Svasti Sobhana and Prince Svasti Mahisza	Amsterdam	Arrived as an honorary guest of Queen Wilhelmina, where they visited the Rijksmuseum and Coster Diamonds. This was a part of his tour of Europe.
24–27 October 1960	King Bhumibol Adulyadej and Queen Sirkit	Amsterdam, the Hague, Rotterdam	As part of their tour of Europe, the Netherlands served as the second last stop. They also attended a gala event in the Hague.
28 April — 2 May 1980	Princess Srindhorn and Princess Chulabhorn	Amsterdam	Represented the King and Queen of Thailand during the coronation of Queen Beatrix.
4–6 October 2010	Princess Srindhorn	Groningen, Enschede and the Hague	Came on the invitation of the University of Twente, and also visited the University of Groningen. Participated in a banquet hosted by Prince Willem-Alexander in the Hague.
27–29 August 2012	Princess Srindhorn	Venlo	Visited to attend the Floriade 2012, after a previous visit to Germany.
19 April 2013	Princess Srindhorn and Crown Prince Maha Vajiralongkorn	Amsterdam	Attended the Inauguration of King Willem-Alexander, with Crown Prince Maha Vajiralongkorn representing King Bhumibol.

State and official visits to Thailand by a Dutch royal
Dates	People	Locations	Itinerary
16–21 November 1962	Princess Beatrix	Bangkok, Kanchanaburi	Visited the Reclining Buddha in Bangkok, as well as war cemeteries in Kanchanaburi.
24–26 August 1971	Queen Juliana and Prince Bernhard of Lippe-Biesterfeld	Bangkok	Left Amsterdam and arrived in Thailand. After their visit to Thailand, they then went to Indonesia.
19–23 January 2004	Queen Beatrix and Crown Prince Willem-Alexander	Bangkok	Arrived to celebrate the 400th anniversary of Dutch-Thai relations.
12–14 June 2006	Crown Prince Willem-Alexander and Princess Maxima	Bangkok	Attended the Diamond Jubilee of King Bhumibol Adulyadej

== Resident diplomatic missions ==
- The Netherlands has an embassy in Bangkok.
- Thailand has an embassy in The Hague.

== See also ==
- Foreign relations of the Netherlands
- Foreign relations of Thailand
