= Chetthathirat =

King of Ayutthaya from 1628 to 1629

Chetthathirat เชษฐาธิราช

King of Ayutthaya
- Reign: 12 December 1628 – 1629
- Predecessor: Songtham
- Successor: Athittayawong
- Born: c. 1613
- Died: 1629 (aged 16); Wat Khok Phraya, Ayutthaya, Ayutthaya Kingdom
Names
- Chetthathirat; Borommaracha II
- Dynasty: Sukhothai
- Father: Songtham
- Mother: Ammarit

Chetthathirat (Thai: เชษฐาธิราช, Jeṣaṭhādhirāja) or Borommaracha II (บรมราชาที่ ๒; c. 1613 – 1629) was the eldest son of King Song Tham and older brother of Athittayawong and Phra Sisin or Phra Phanpi Sisin (Thai: พระพันปีศรีศิลป์); all three were members of the Sukhothai dynasty. In childhood he was known as Chetthakuman (พระเชษฐากุมาร), meaning 'Chettha the Infant', or simply Chettha.

== Reign ==
Chetthathirat reigned for around a year according to Songtham's wishes conveyed to Okya Sri Vorawong (Thai: ออกญาศรีวรวงศ์) or Phraya Siworawong – an influential royal page. The events were detailed by Jeremias van Vliet.

This proposed succession was objected to by some leaders in the kingdom, including the military minister, Samuha Kalahom Chao Phraya Maha Sena. Siworawong gained supporters in the government, and even used the services of Yamada Nagamasa the Okya Senaphimuk (Thai: ออกญาเสนาภิมุข). Upon king Songtham’s death, Chetthathirat took the throne and Siworawong arrested and executed those who had opposed the idea. The new king made Siworawong military minister, as Okya Kalahom Siworawong (Thai: ออกญากลาโหมสุริยวงศ์) or Chaophraya Kalahom.

Siworawong then induced Phra Sisin, who had entered the priesthood, to come to the palace with his followers. Siworawong captured him and ordered his execution. However, Chetthathirat spared his life but exiled him to Phetchaburi. Later Chetthathirat did execute Phra Sisin, when he plotted rebellion.

== Death ==
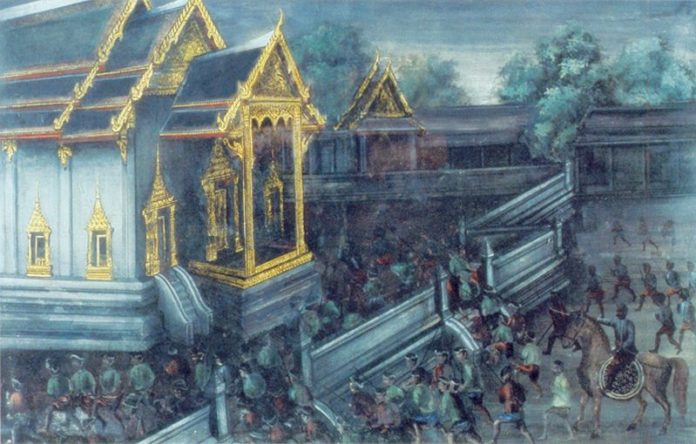
Rebellion of Okya Kalahom Sri Vorawong in 1629, painting made by an unknown Thai artist according to the royal decree of king Chulalongkorn in 1897.

Upon the death of Siworawong's mother, Siworawong held a grand cremation ceremony over several days, attended by every government servant. This jealously infuriated the king who was attempting to conduct government business, and punished those servants. Siworawong sought to protect those servants and they vowed their support in opposing the monarch. They attacked the palace, captured the king and executed him. The throne was given to his younger brother Phra Athittayawong.

Chetthathirat House of Sukhothai Cadet branch of the House of Phra Ruang Born: 1613 Died: 1629
Regnal titles
Preceded by Songtham	King of Ayutthaya; 1628–1629	Succeeded by Athittayawong
