= Athittayawong =

King of Ayutthaya in 1629

Athittayawong อาทิตยวงศ์

King of Ayutthaya
- Reign: August 1629 – September 1629 (36 days)
- Predecessor: Chetthathirat
- Successor: Prasat Thong
- Dynasty: Sukhothai
- Father: Songtham

Athittayawong (Thai: อาทิตยวงศ์, Ādityavaṅśa) was the shortest-reigning monarch of Ayutthaya, ruling for about 36 days in 1629 and often regarded as the last king of the Sukhothai dynasty.

Prince Athittayawong was a son of King Songtham. In 1629, following a coup led by Okya Siworawong (Thai: ออกญาศรีวรวงศ์), Athittayawong was removed from the throne, paving the way for Prasat Thong's accession.

== The Puppet King ==
The ten-year-old child prince was raised to the throne by Siworawong. However, Siworawong continued to administer the country as Chaophraya Kalahom. After about a month, the government servants complained that there were in fact two rulers in the country, Athittayawong and Siworawong administering as a king, which could cause future danger for the country. They persuaded Siworawong to ascend to the throne so there would be only one king as per custom. Athittayawong was dethroned and Siworawong assumed the title Somdet Phrachao Prasat Thong.

== Death ==
Athitayawong was executed at Wat Kok Phraya (Thai: วัดโคกพระยา) soon after being deposed, ending the Sukhothai dynasty. Siworawong ascended the throne as the first king of the Prasat Thong dynasty.

== See also ==
- List of Thai monarchs

Athittayawong Sukhothai Dynasty Born: 1620 Died: 1637
Regnal titles
| Preceded by Chetthathirat | King of Ayutthaya; 36 days in 1629 | Succeeded by Prasat Thong |
