= Wat Chaiwatthanaram =

Buddhist temple in Ayutthaya Historical Park, Thailand

Coordinates: 14°20′35″N 100°32′30″E

- วัดไชยวัฒนาราม
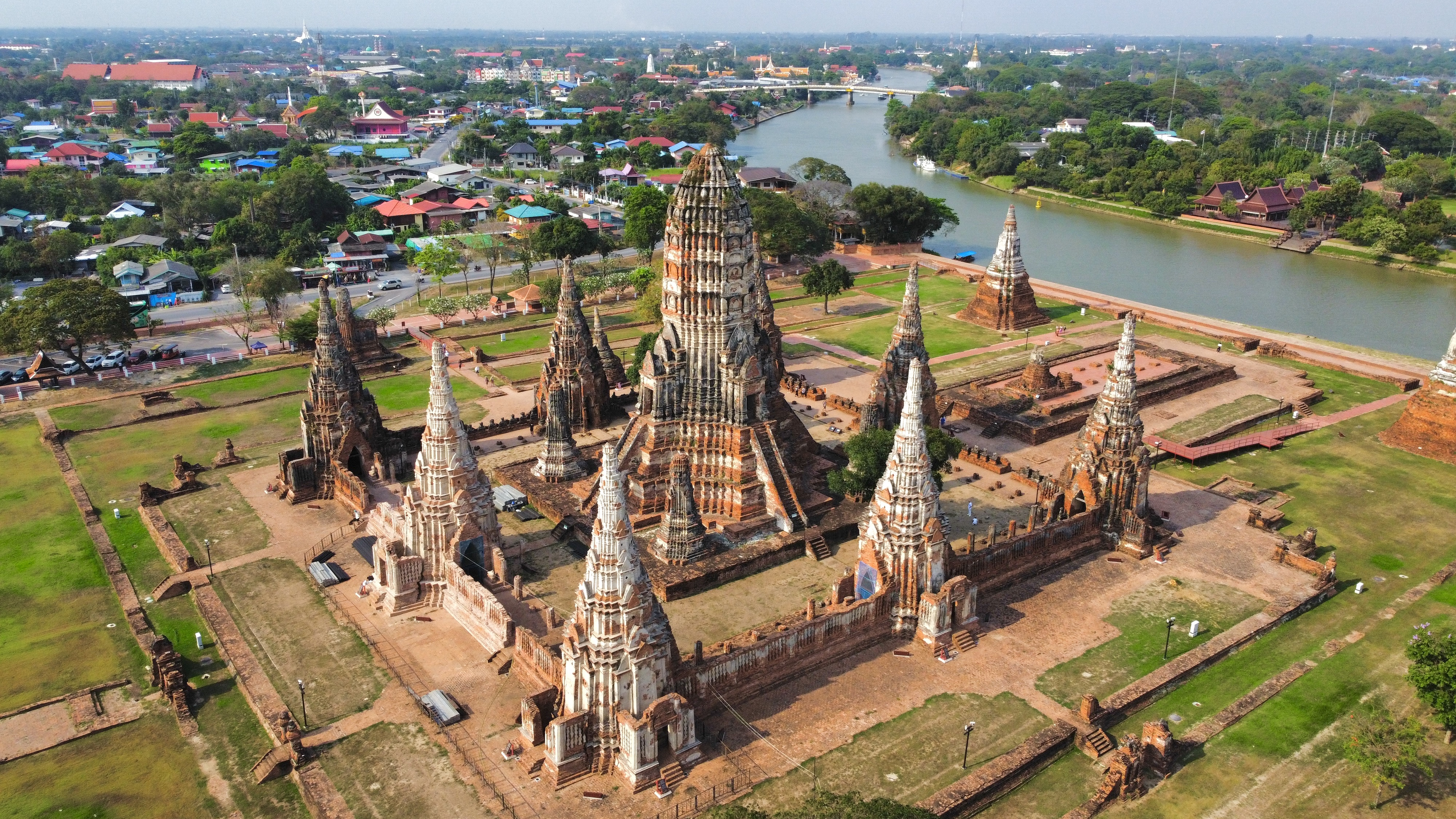
- Wat Chaiwatthanaram from above with Ayutthaya city visible in the background

Religion
- Affiliation: Buddhist
- Sect: Theravada
- District: Ayutthaya
- Province: Ayutthaya

Location
- Country: Thailand
- Interactive map of Wat Chaiwatthanaram

Architecture
- Founder: Prasat Thong
- Completed: 1630

Wat Chaiwatthanaram (Thai: วัดไชยวัฒนาราม) is a Buddhist temple in the city of Ayutthaya Historical Park, Thailand, on the west bank of the Chao Phraya River, outside Ayutthaya island. It is one of Ayutthaya's best known temples and a major tourist attraction.

== Location ==
Wat Chaiwatthanaram lies on the west bank of Chao Phraya River, south-west of the old city of Ayutthaya. It is a large compound part of Ayutthaya Historical Park; however not a part of Historic City of Ayutthaya, a UNESCO World Heritage Site. It can be reached by road or by boat.

== History ==
The temple was constructed in 1630 by the king, Prasat Thong, as the first temple of his reign, as a memorial of his mother's residence in that area. The temple's name literally means the Temple of long reign and glorious era. It was designed in Khmer style to gain Buddhist merit and as a memorial to his mother, however Prince Damrong believed it was built to celebrate Ayutthaya Kingdom's victory over Longvek.

It has a central 35-meter-high (115 ft) prang (Thai: พระปรางด์ประธาน) with four smaller prangs. The whole construction stands on a rectangular platform. About halfway up, there are hidden entrances, to which steep stairs lead.

The central platform is surrounded by eight chedi-shaped chapels (Thai: เมรุทิศ เมรุราย - Meru Thit Meru Rai), which are connected by a rectangular cross-shaped passage (Phra Rabieng). The passage had numerous side entries and was originally roofed and open inwards, but today only the foundations of the pillars and the outside wall still stand. Along the wall, there were 120 sitting Buddha statues, probably painted in black and gold.

The eight chedi-like chapels are formed in a unique way. They had paintings on the interior walls, the exterior ones decorated by 12 reliefs depicting scenes from the life of Buddha (Jataka), which must be "read" clockwise. Just fragments of the paintings and the reliefs survived. In each of the rectangular chedis were two sitting Buddha statues, and in each of the four middle chedis was one big sitting Buddha statue, also lacquered in black and gold. The ceiling over those statues was of wood with golden stars on black lacquer.

Outside the passages on the east, close to the river, was the temple's ordination hall (Phra Ubosot). North and south from the Ubusot stood two chedis with 12 indented corners, in which the ashes of the king's mother were laid.

After the total destruction of the old capital (Thai: กรุงเก่า - Krung Kao) by the Burmese in 1767, from which Wat Chai Watthanaram was not spared, the temple was deserted. Theft, sale of bricks from the ruins and the beheading of the Buddha statues were common. Only in 1987 did the Thai Department of Fine Arts start restoring the site. In 1992, it was opened to the public.

During the 2011 Thai floods, Wat Chaiwatthanaram became submerged under 2 metres of water and was significantly damaged. It underwent restoration by the Department of Fine Arts under a budget of 200 million baht.

== Usage ==
Wat Chaiwatthanaram was a royal temple where the king and his successors performed religious ceremonies. Princes and princess were cremated here, including King Boromakot's son Chaofa Thammathibet (เจ้าฟ้าธรรมธิเบศร).

== Symbolic ==
The Wat Chaiwatthanaram structure reflects the Buddhist world view, as it is described already in the Traiphum Phra Ruang, the "three worlds of the King Ruang", of the 14th century: The big "Prang Prathan" that stands in the centre symbolizes the mountain Meru (Thai: เขาพระสุเมรุ - Khao Phra Sumen), which consists the central axis of the traditional world (Kamaphum - กามภูมิ). Around it lie the four continents (the four small Prangs) that swim in the four directions in the world sea (นทีสีทันดร). On one of the continents, the Chomphutawip (ชมพูทวีป), the humans live. The rectangular passage is the outer border of the world, the "Iron Mountains" (กำแพงจักรวาล).

== Gallery ==
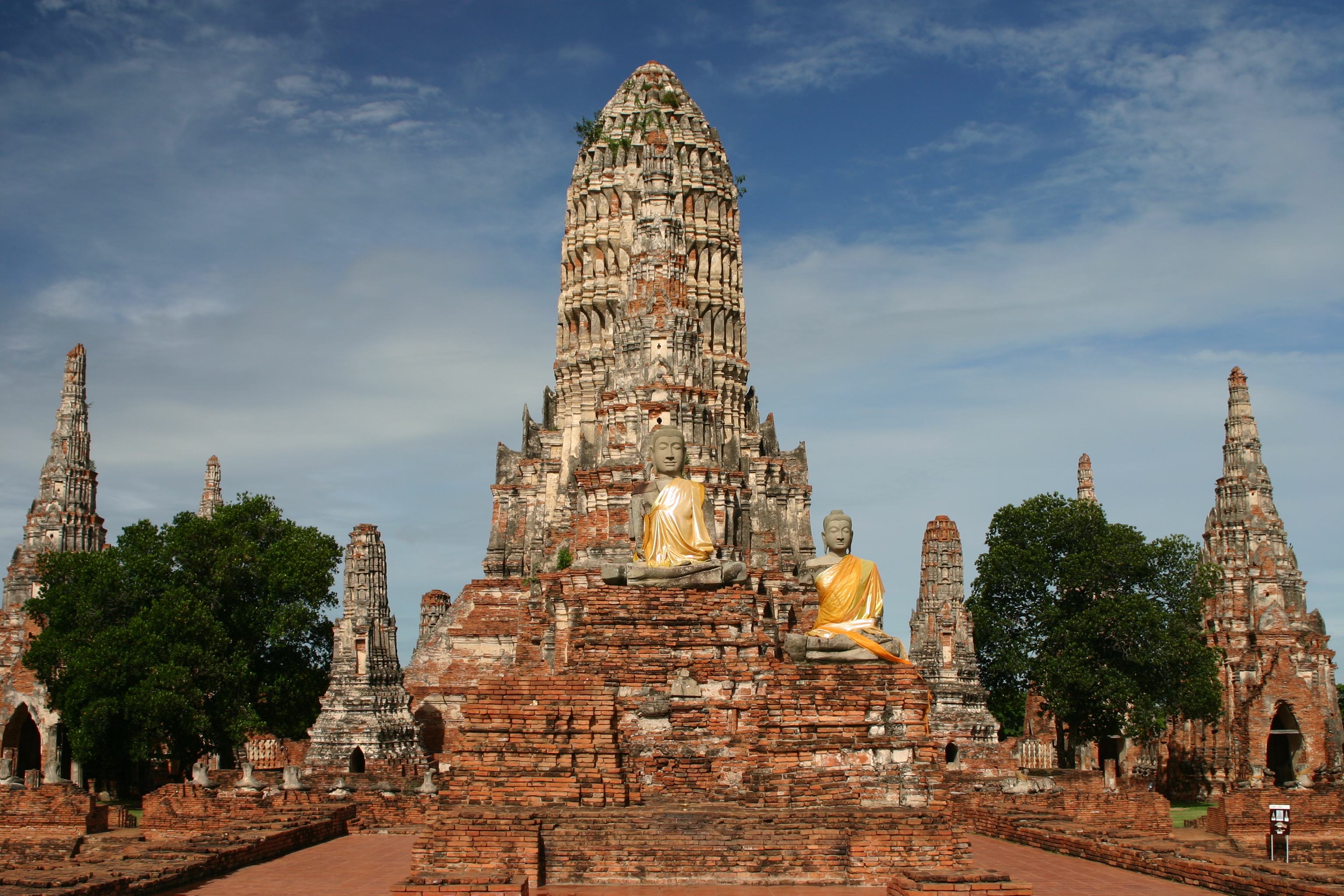
Wat Chaiwatthanaram

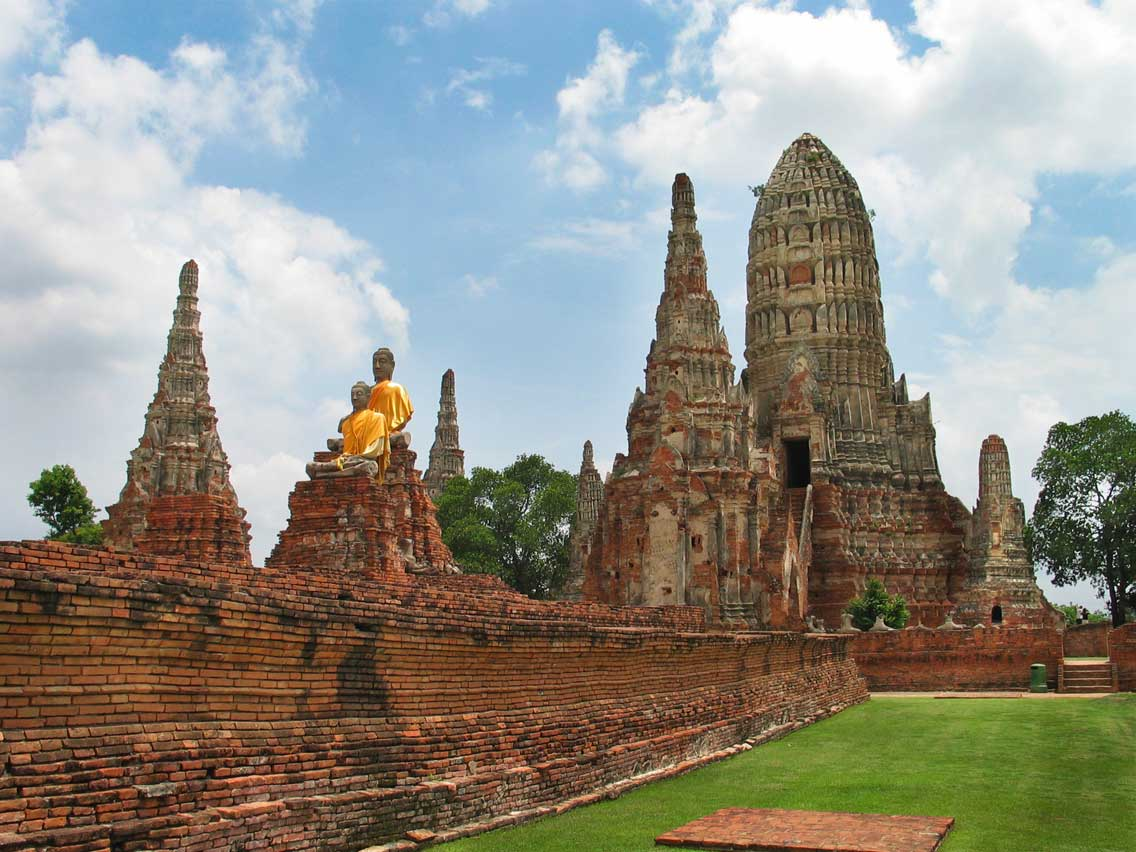
Statues at Wat Chaiwatthanaram

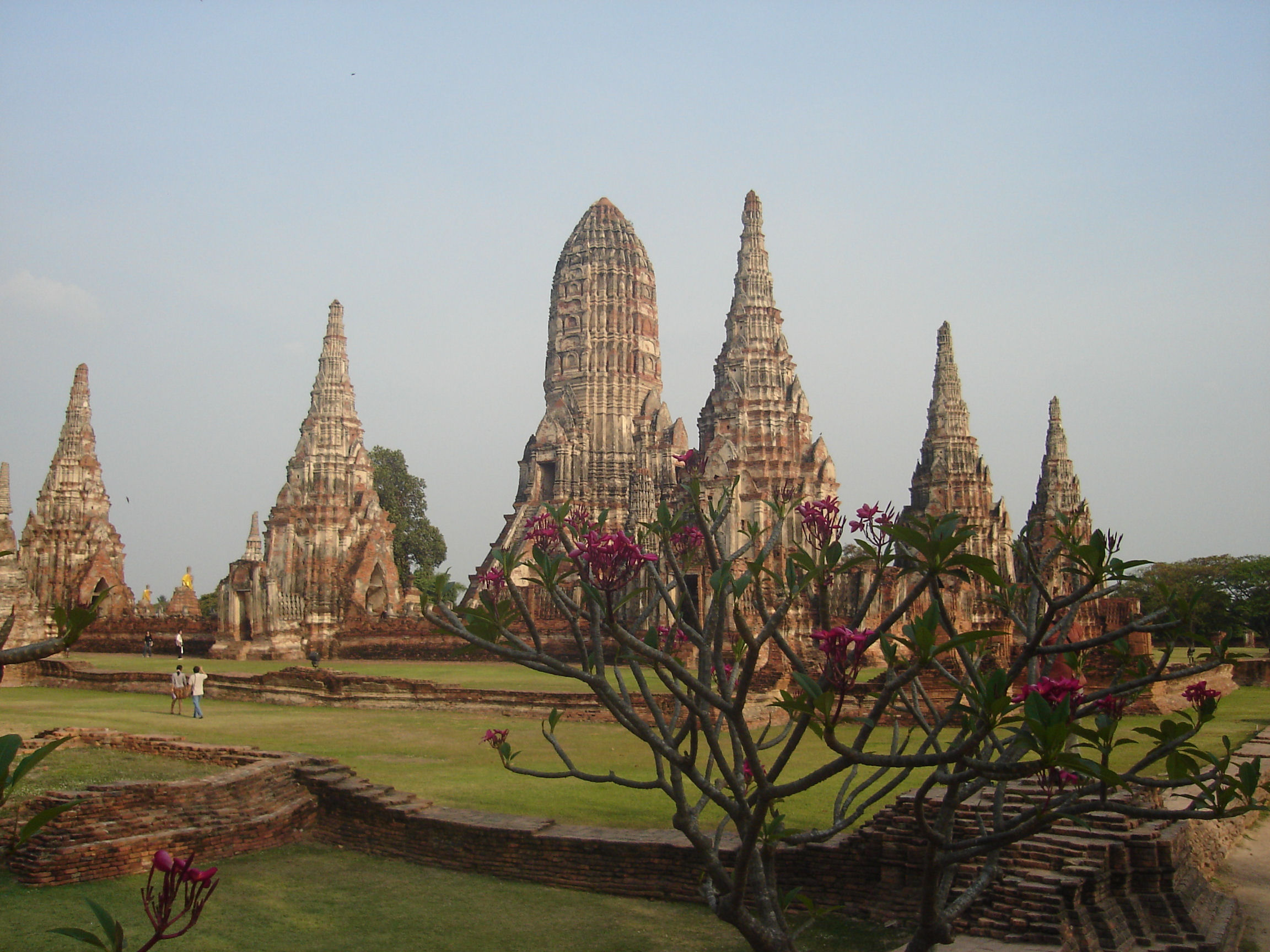
Wat Chaiwatthanaram

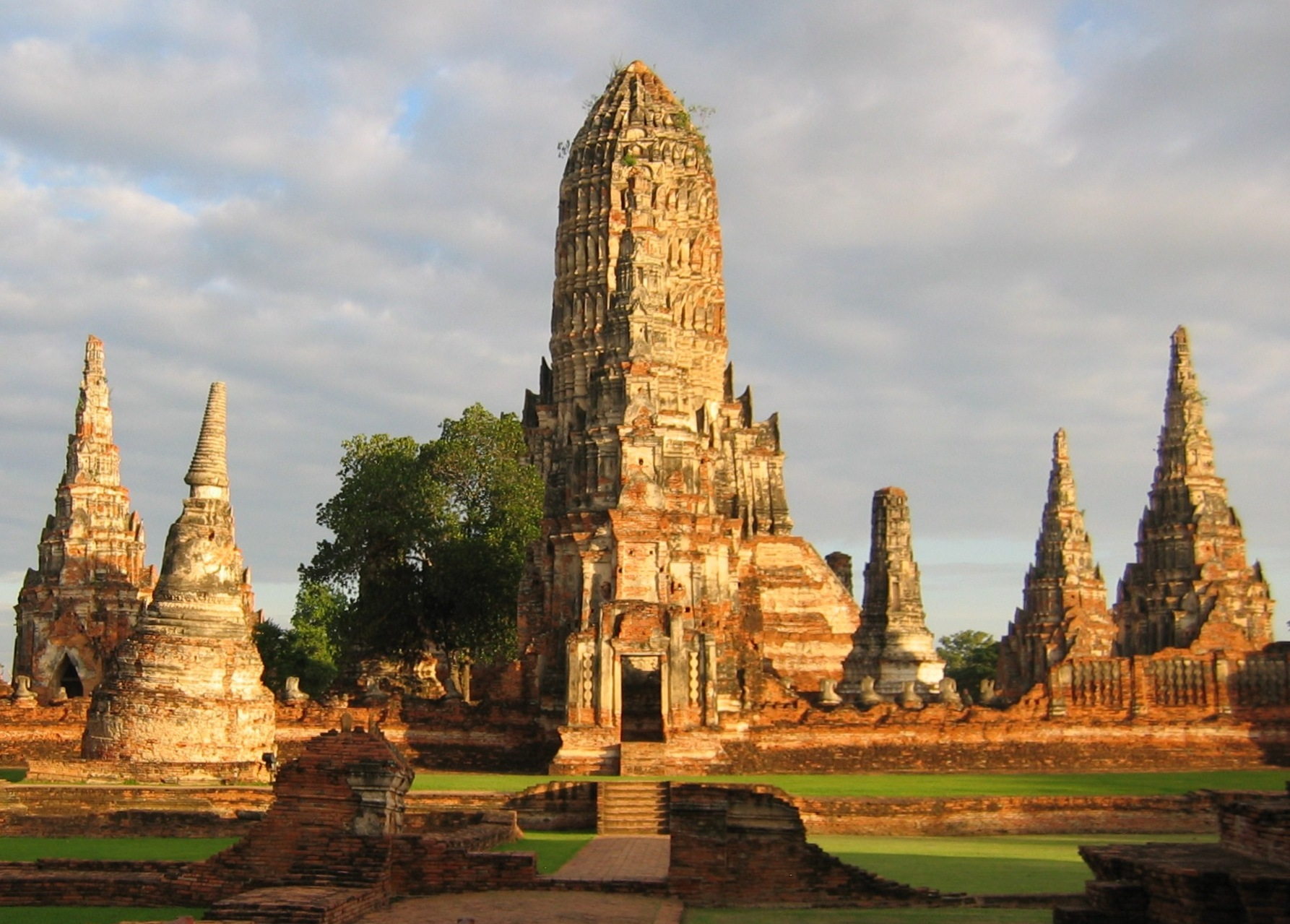
Wat Chaiwatthanaram, late afternoon

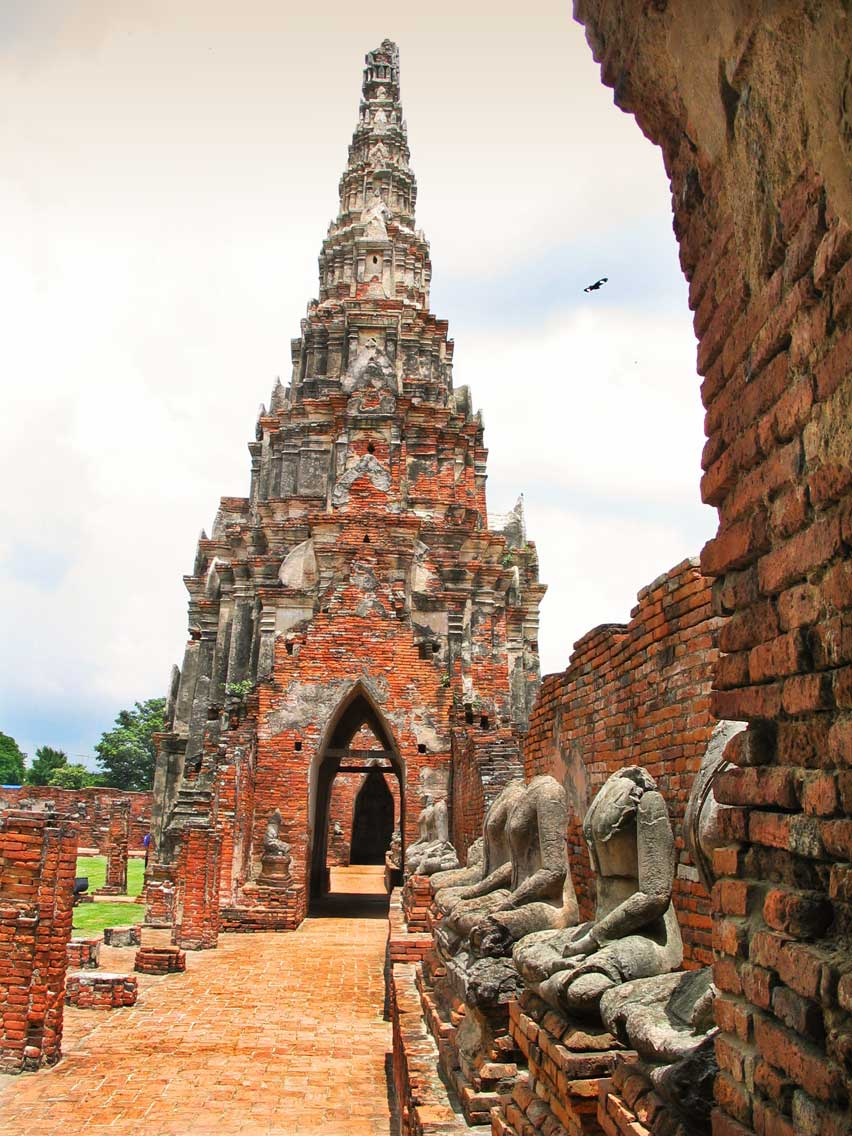
Walkway detail

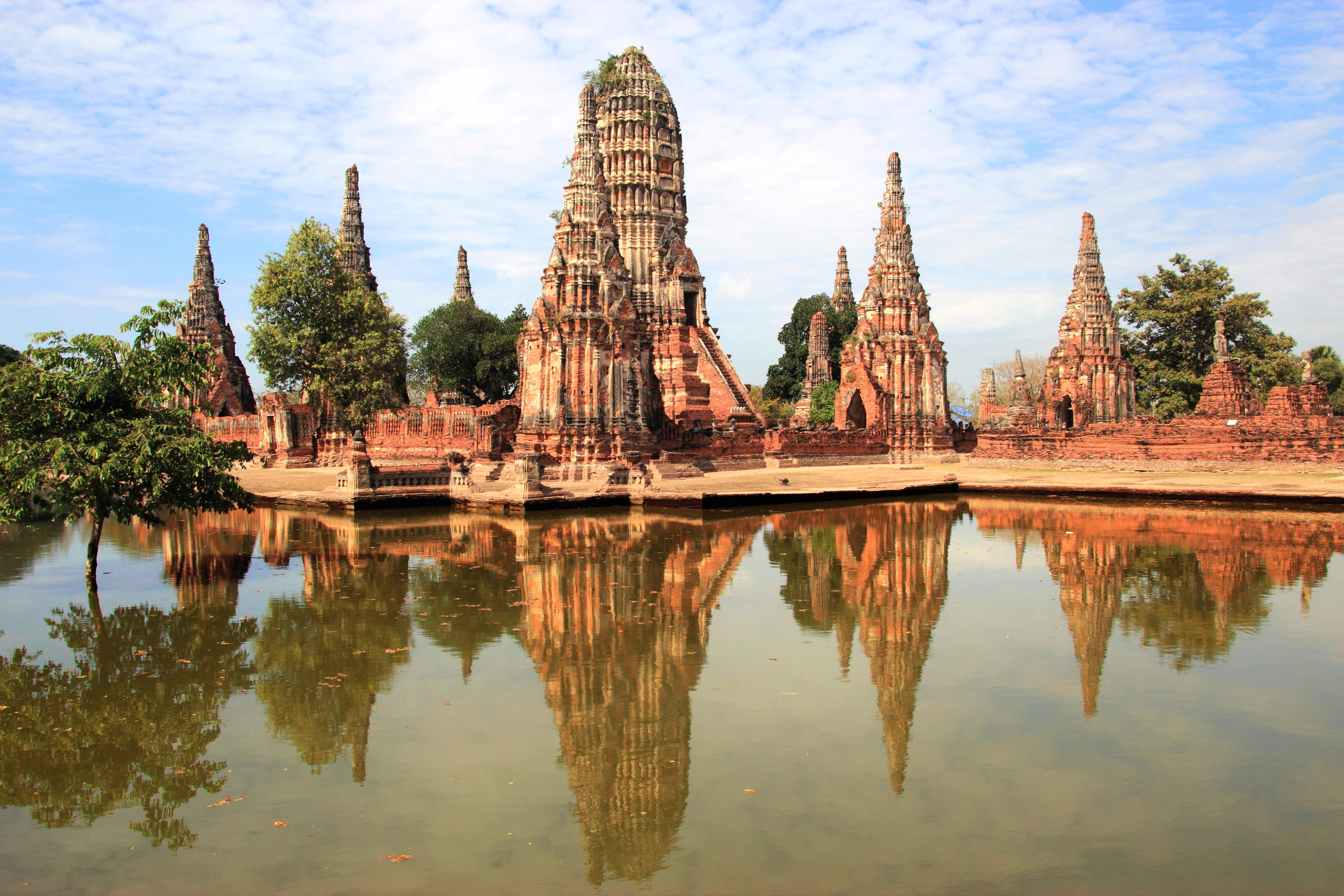
Wat Chaiwatthanaram with reflection on water
