= Sanphet VI (Chai) =

Chai ไชย

King of Ayutthaya
- Reign: 1655–1656
- Predecessor: Prasat Thong
- Successor: Si Suthammaracha
- Born: 1630
- Died: 1656 (aged 25–26)
Names
- Chai; Sanphet VI
- Dynasty: Prasat Thong
- Father: Prasat Thong

Chai (Thai: ไชย) or Somdet Chao Fa Chai (Thai: สมเด็จเจ้าฟ้าไชย; 1630 – 1656), also known as Sanphet VI (Thai: สมเด็จพระสรรเพชญ์ที่ 6), was the king of the Ayutthaya Kingdom from 1655 to 1656. The eldest son of King Prasat Thong, he reigned for less than a year before being deposed and executed in a coup led by his uncle, Si Suthammaracha, and his younger brother, Narai.

== Reign and Overthrow ==
Upon King Prasat Thong’s death in 1655, Chao Fa Chai, his eldest son, succeeded his father as King Sanpet VI.

However, it was a Thai tradition gave brothers a higher priority over sons in succession. Prince Si Suthammaracha, Chao Fa Chai's uncle, plotted with his nephew, Prince Narai, to bring Chao Fa Chai down. After nine months of ascension, Chao Fa Chai was executed following a coup. Narai and his uncle marched into the palace, and Si Suthammaracha crowned himself king. Si Suthammaracha appointed Narai as the Uparaja, or the Front Palace.

Sanphet VI (Chai) House of Prasat Thong Born: 1630 Died: 1656
Regnal titles
Preceded by Prasat Thong	King of Ayutthaya; 1655–1656	Succeeded by Si Suthammaracha
