= Prasat Thong =

Prasat Thong ปราสาททอง
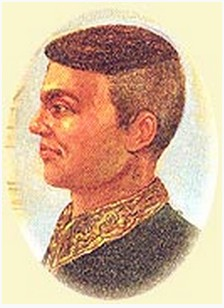
- Portrait of King Prasat Thong

King of Ayutthaya
- Reign: 1629 – 8 August 1655
- Predecessor: Athittayawong
- Successor: Chai
- Born: c. 1599
- Died: 8 August 1655 (aged approx. 56)
- Spouse: Sirithida
- Issue: Chai; Narai; Traiphuwanathittayawong; Thong; Intharacha; Aphaiyathot; Noi; Yothathip
Names
- Sanphet V
- Dynasty: Prasat Thong
- Father: Okya Sithammathirat

Prasat Thong (Thai: ปราสาททอง, pronounced [prāː.sàːt.tʰɔ̄ːŋ]; c. 1599–1655; reigned 1629–1655) was the founder and first monarch of the Prasat Thong dynasty, the fourth ruling house of the Ayutthaya Kingdom. Formerly a high-ranking official known as Okya Kalahom (Thai: ออกญากลาโหม), he rose to prominence during the reign of King Songtham by assisting in the suppression of a rebellion led by the king's son, Phra Sisin, in collaboration with the Japanese mercenary leader Yamada Nagamasa. Following a series of succession crises after Songtham's death, he seized power in 1629, briefly installing the infant Athittayawong as a puppet king before executing him and ascending the throne himself. His reign was marked by the reassertion of Siamese authority over Cambodia, though it also saw a weakening of Ayutthaya's control over its northern principalities.

== Early life ==
Accounts vary on the origin of Prasat Thong. While traditional Thai historians hold that he was an illegitimate son of King Ekathotsarot, Jeremias van Vliet's account states that he was the maternal cousin of King Songtham – his father was Okya Sithammathirat (ออกญาศรีธรรมาธิราช), elder brother of the mother of King Songtham. He was born during the reign of King Naresuan around 1599.

Known in his youth as Phra Ong Lai, he was notorious for his rebellious behavior. According to van Vliet, he reportedly led a gang in nighttime robberies, which frequently resulted in his father being imprisoned on his behalf. At the age of sixteen, he received the title of Chamuen Srisorarak (จมื่นศรีสรรักษ์). His most audacious offense occurred at the age of eighteen when he violently disrupted the palace Agricultural Initiation Ceremony, a sacred royal ceremony of ploughing. Riding an elephant alongside his younger brother, he attacked the Lord of the Ceremony with drawn swords. Enraged by the incident, King Songtham ordered the immediate arrest of Chamuen Srisorarak and threatened his father, Okya Sithammathirat, with execution if he failed to produce his son. Chamuen Srisorarak initially fled and sought sanctuary with Buddhist monks at a temple. However, upon learning of the grave danger facing his father, he surrendered himself to the King. He was subsequently thrown into a dungeon and bound in chains for five months. He was eventually released and restored to royal favor through the intercession of Chao Khrua Manichan, the widowed queen of the late King Naresuan.

Following his royal pardon, which was granted through the intercession of Chao Khrua Manichan, Chamuen Srisorarak remained undeterred by the threat of royal punishment. Instead, he conceived an even more treasonous plot: the assassination of Prince Ong Thong and Prince Sisin, the younger brothers of King Songtham. However, the conspiracy was uncovered by the King before it could be executed. As a consequence of this high treason, he was sentenced to three years of confinement in a dark dungeon, later, during preparations for a major military campaign against Cambodia, he appealed through the Okya Uparat for a royal pardon, promising to redeem himself through military service. King Songtham eventually granted clemency after more than three years of imprisonment and assigned him to the naval campaign against Cambodia. Although the Ayutthaya army's campaign against Cambodia was unsuccessful, he distinguished himself through his valiant deeds on the battlefield, earning praise from senior commanders.

Despite his reinstatement, Chamuen Srisorarak's conduct remained unchanged, as he engaged in illicit affairs with the wives and concubines of the King’s younger brother. The prince bitterly petitioned the sovereign regarding the matter. Infuriated by this severe offense, King Songtham initially sentenced him to death. However, out of deference to the earnest pleas of the offender's parents, the King commuted the death penalty to life imprisonment.

After spending years in prison, he was once again pardoned and reinstated into royal service. Following his release, he dedicated himself diligently to his duties. His boldness, decisive leadership, and administrative competence earned him the deep favor of King Songtham, who subsequently promoted him to the noble title of Okya Siworawong (ออกญาศรีวรวงศ์), or Phraya Siworawong – a high-ranking title of royal page.

== Rise to power ==
The rise of Prasat Thong to power was documented in van Vliet's The Historical Account of the war of Succession following the death of King Pra Interajatsia (1650). As the king's maternal cousin, he held great influence. It is said that he was an ambitious prince and wanted to become a king. King Songtham had had his brother Phra Phanpi Sisin or Phra Sisin (Siamese chronicles states that Phra Sisin was one of the King Songtham's three sons) as the Front Palace, technically his successor, but a palace faction including Prasat Thong persuaded the king to give the throne instead to his son Prince Chetthathirat. Upon the death of King Songtham in 1628, Chetthathirat ascended the throne, followed by a major purge of court officials who had supported the rival claimant Phra Sisin. Among those executed was the incumbent Samuha Kalahom (Minister of Military Affairs). Following his successful suppression of the Japanese revolt, he was promoted to Okya Kalahom Suriyawong (ออกญากลาโหมสุริยวงศ์) and bestowed with a large quantity of royal paraphernalia.

== The king maker ==
During the reign of King Chetthathirat, Okya Kalahom Suriyawong maintained a strategic alliance with Yamada Nagamasa or Okya Senaphimuk, the influential leader of the Japanese mercenaries. Following Chetthathirat's ascension, the King's brother, Phra Sisin, sought refuge in the monkhood. According to the Royal Chronicles, he was later lured back to the palace, stripped of his monastic robes, and arrested. He was exiled to Phetchaburi to be executed by starvation in a deep well. However, he was reportedly saved by local monks who substituted a corpse in his place, allowing Phra Sisin to organize a short-lived rebellion. Okya Kalahom dispatched Yamada Nagamasa to suppress the uprising; Phra Sisin was eventually captured and executed in Ayutthaya.

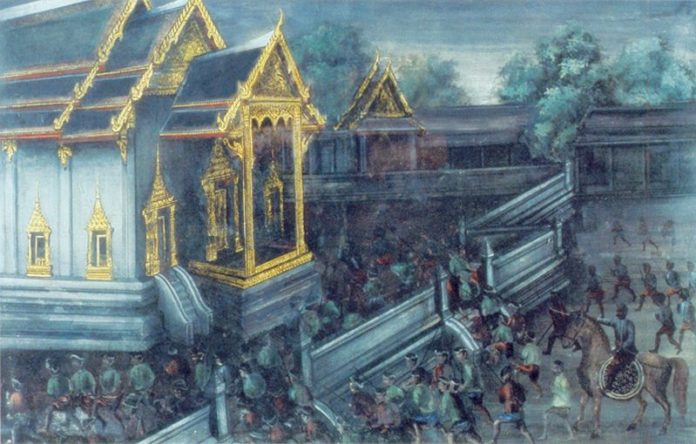
Rebellion of Okya Kalahom in 1629, painting made by an unknown Thai artist according to the royal decree of King Chulalongkorn in 1897.

With his primary rival eliminated, Okya Kalahom's influence grew unchecked. In 1629, the death of his father became a pivotal political turning point. He organized a grand funeral with ceremonies and cremations normally reserved for royalty, a move seen by many as a direct challenge to the throne. When King Chetthathirat discovered that the majority of his nobles had attended the funeral instead of his royal audience, he was reportedly incensed and threatened punishment.

Guided by his ally, the Okya Phraklang (Minister of Trade), Okya Kalahom launched a preemptive strike, leading his private army into the palace. King Chetthathirat fled but was captured and subsequently executed. In his place, Okya Kalahom installed the King's seven-year-old (some sources say eleven) brother, Athittayawong, as a puppet ruler. Acting as regent, Okya Kalahom assumed near-absolute authority, effectively setting the stage for his own coronation shortly thereafter.

== Coup and rebellion ==
Prasat Thong strived to eliminate his allies-turned-rivals – the Okya Kamhaeng who contested for the throne and Yamada Nagamasa who objected to the takeover of the throne by Prasat Thong. He quickly condemned Okya Kamhaeng for treason and execution followed. And he sent Yamada Nagamasa to the south as the governor of Ligor, away from Ayutthaya. As soon as the Japanese mandarin left the city, only about a month after his ascension, the child-king was deposed and subsequently executed. Suriyawong or Okya Suriyawong crowned himself as the full-fledged King of Siam.

Prasat Thong had acted as "king-maker" before assuming the throne, by performing the double regicide of King Songtham's sons. Yamada, Okya Seniphimok, heard of the coup at Ayutthaya and rebelled. Prasat Thong had him poisoned and then expelled the remaining Japanese.

== Reign and succession ==
King Prasat Thong was a powerful and decisive leader who significantly centralized royal authority. He promulgated several important criminal and civil laws. According to the records of van Vliet, the King was known for his absolute and sometimes ruthless exercise of power, occasionally executing prisoners by himself to demonstrate his judicial supremacy.

Under his reign, Ayutthaya flourished as a major international trading center, attracting numerous European merchants, particularly from the Dutch East India Company (VOC). Prasat Thong sought to control the port towns in the southern peninsula to monopolize profits from overseas trade, leading to military expeditions against the Sultanate of Patani between 1632 and 1634. However, the kingdom saw a decline in its northern influence, losing control over principalities such as Chiang Mai to the Toungoo Dynasty of Burma. In 1630, he also suppressed the Japanese settlement in Ayutthaya and expelled Yamada Nagamasa.

Under Prasat Thong, Cambodia became subject to Siam again. He then built the capital city using Angkor Thom as a model and built "places of temporary rest on the way to the footprint of the Buddha."

Upon King Prasat Thong's death in 1656 (some sources state 1655), his eldest son, Chao Fa Chai, succeeded him as King Sanpet VI. However, his reign lasted only a brief period before he was deposed and executed following a coup led by his uncle, Si Suthammaracha, and his younger brother, the future King Narai the Great.

== Character ==
Jeremias van Vliet, an official of the Dutch East India Company (VOC), provided a vivid account of Prasat Thong's character, describing him as a bold and fearless individual who was daring and ready to take risks. This audacity was deeply rooted in his personality, manifesting early on through his notoriously rebellious and hot-tempered behavior during his youth.

While van Vliet also portrayed him as a treacherous and deceitful figure who utilized cunning strategies to seize power, he acknowledged the King's formidable capabilities. These traits were further echoed by Nicolas Gervaise, who noted that the King was a person of great ambition, aspiring far above all commoners.

Beyond his political persona, van Vliet noted that the King was an avid drinker with a particular fondness for exotic and newly imported liquors, which he frequently served during banquets for nobles and high-ranking dignitaries. Furthermore, he skillfully employed alcohol as a diplomatic tool, fostering ties with the Japanese Shogunate by gifting premium Thai rice specifically intended for the fermentation of sake.

Despite these social graces, van Vliet's records emphasize a legacy of betrayal and manipulation. Prasat Thong is described as deliberately orchestrating the rise and subsequent removal of King Songtham's two sons—King Chetthathirat and King Athittayawong—to legitimize his own ascension to the throne. Notably, van Vliet observed that Prasat Thong effectively used his eloquence to denounce King Chetthathirat's alleged cruelty and drunkenness before the council of nobles to win official and public sympathy. Furthermore, he employed elaborate ruses to eliminate his political rivals, such as falsely accusing Okya Kamhaeng of treason and deceiving the Japanese mercenary leader Yamada Nagamasa into leaving the capital for Nakhon Si Thammarat.

In modern Thai historiography, the political maneuvers of King Prasat Thong of Ayutthaya are often analyzed through a Machiavellian lens. His ascension and subsequent reign were characterized by the use of strategic deception, the consolidation of a new power base, and a pragmatic approach to governance centered primarily on the political survival of the sovereign.

== Legacy ==
Constructions under the reign of King Prasat Thong

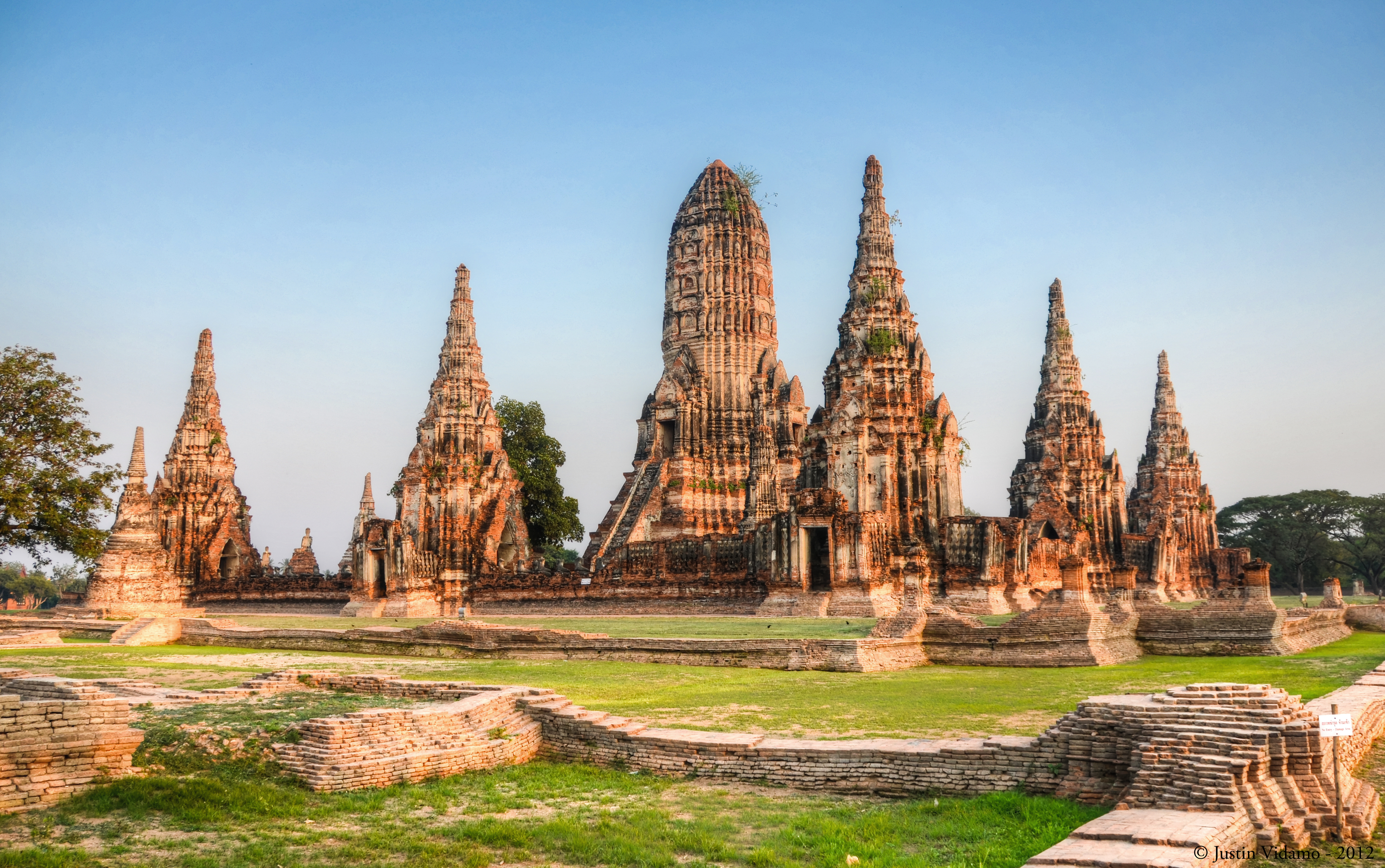
Wat Chaiwatthanaram, Phra Nakhon Si Ayutthaya Province

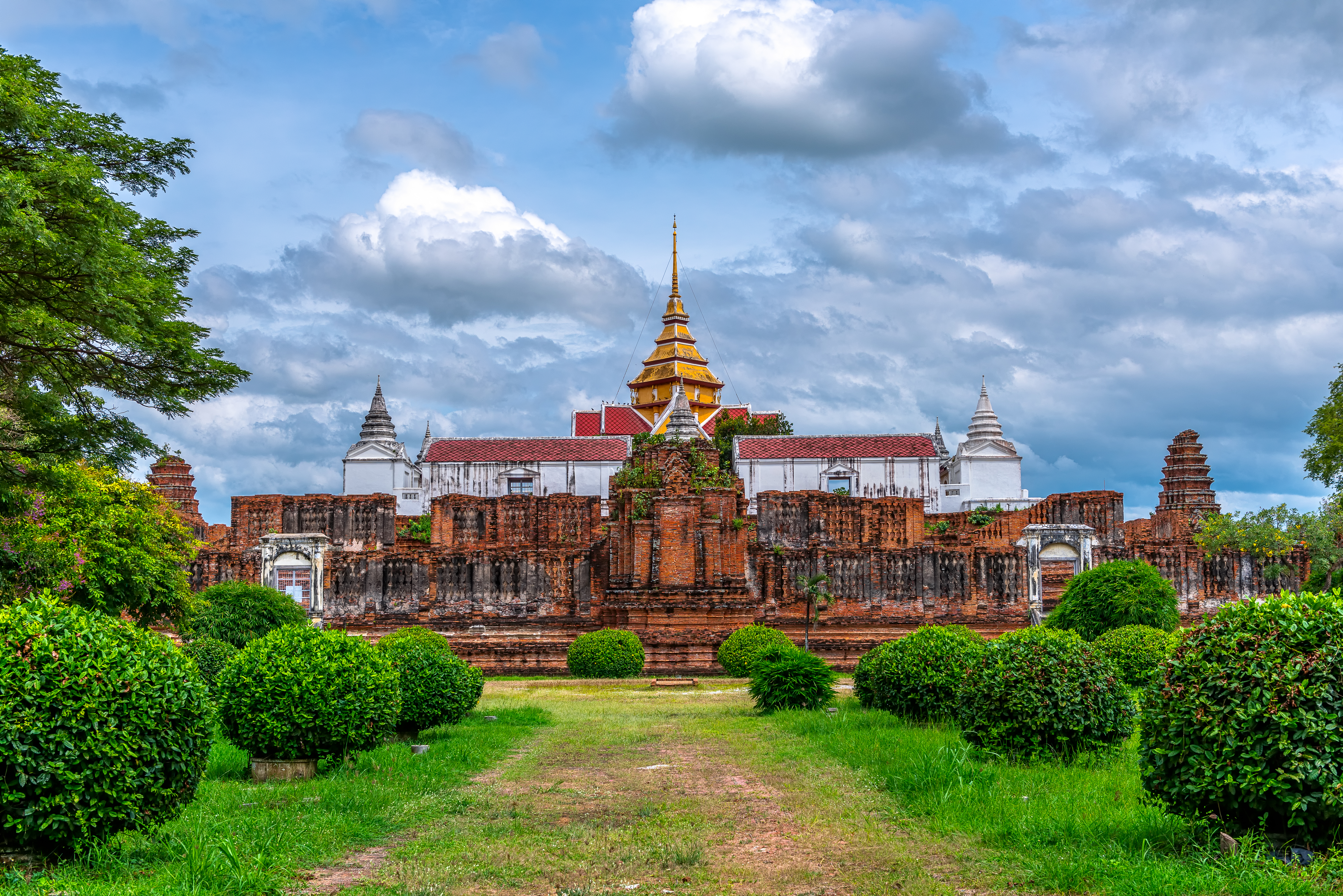
Prasat Nakhon Luang, Phra Nakhon Si Ayutthaya Province

Prasat Thong built the monastery Chumphon Nikayaram where his mother resided and a rest palace, Bang Pa-In Royal Palace, at Bang Pa-In. Multiple projects that was constructed by Prasat Thong still stands today, such as Wat Chaiwatthanaram, in Phra Nakhon Si Ayutthaya Province and the uncompleted Prasat Nakhon Luang, in Phra Nakhon Si Ayutthaya Province (later finished by King Chulalongkorn over 200 years later).

The Eulogy of King Prasat Thong is a remarkable, though lesser-known, example of the Thai tradition of royal panegyrics. Surviving only as a single samut thai (accordion book) fragment, the text records that the poem was originally composed during King Prasat Thong's reign by Phra Maharatchakhru Mahethon, a leading court Brahmin, with this surviving copy made later in 1737/8. Discovered and published for the first time in 1988, the poem offers a unique ideological perspective, stating that King Prasat Thong was a bodhisatta reincarnated from the Palelai elephant and destined to become the tenth future Buddha after Gautama—a claim completely absent from all other historical sources.

The text also chronicles the major milestones of his reign, including the construction and renaming of the Jakkawat Phaichaiyon audience hall, the changing of the calendar era at Chula Sakarat 1000, grand almsgivings, and military parades. Historians note that the poem's spiritual claims, alongside Prasat Thong's religious constructions, ritual practices, and the composition of the eulogy itself, served as crucial building blocks to legitimize a new form of royal absolutism.

== Gallery ==
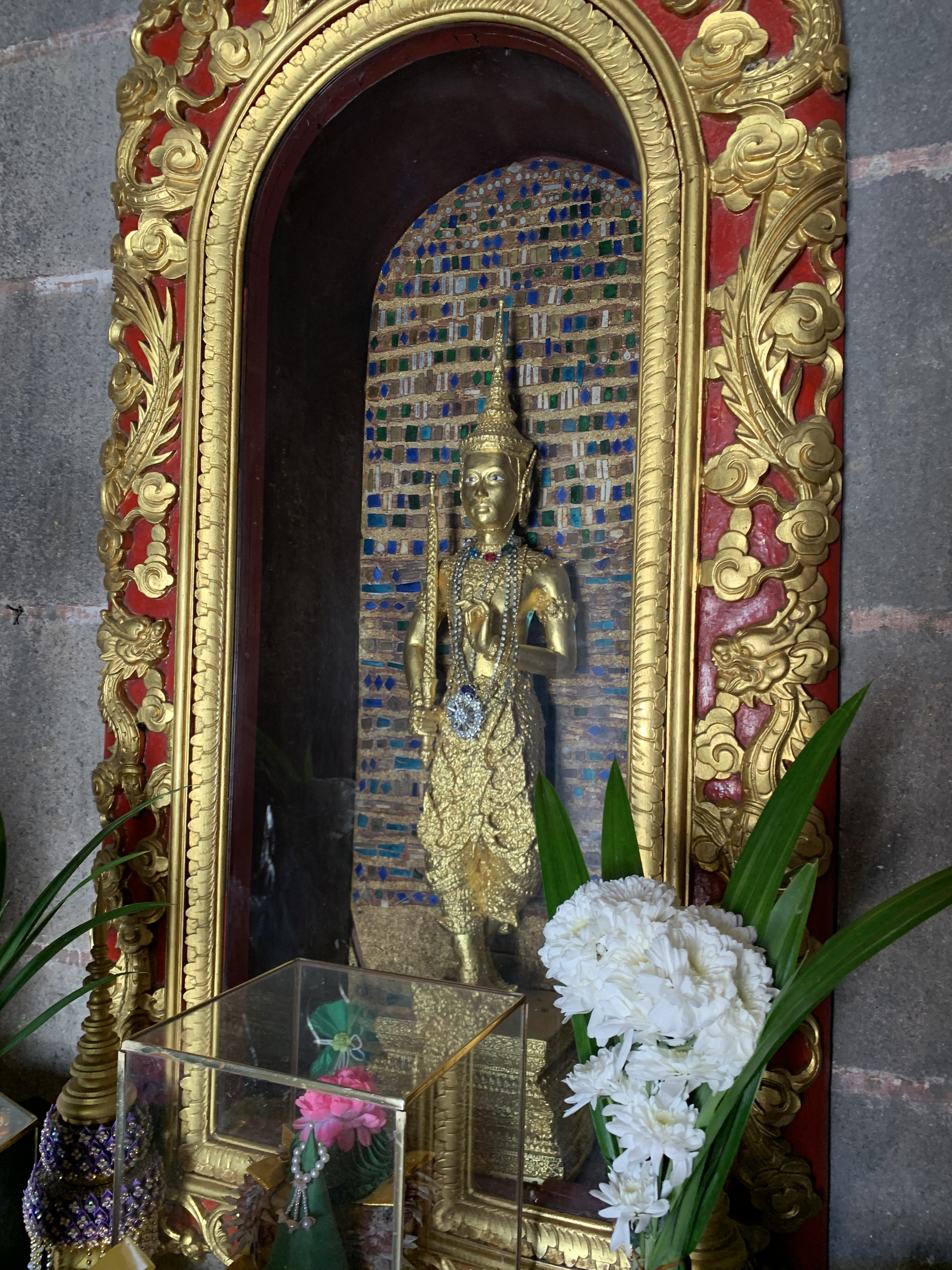
Prasat Thong as a deified idol in Ho Hem Monthian Thewarat, Bang Pa-in Royal Palace

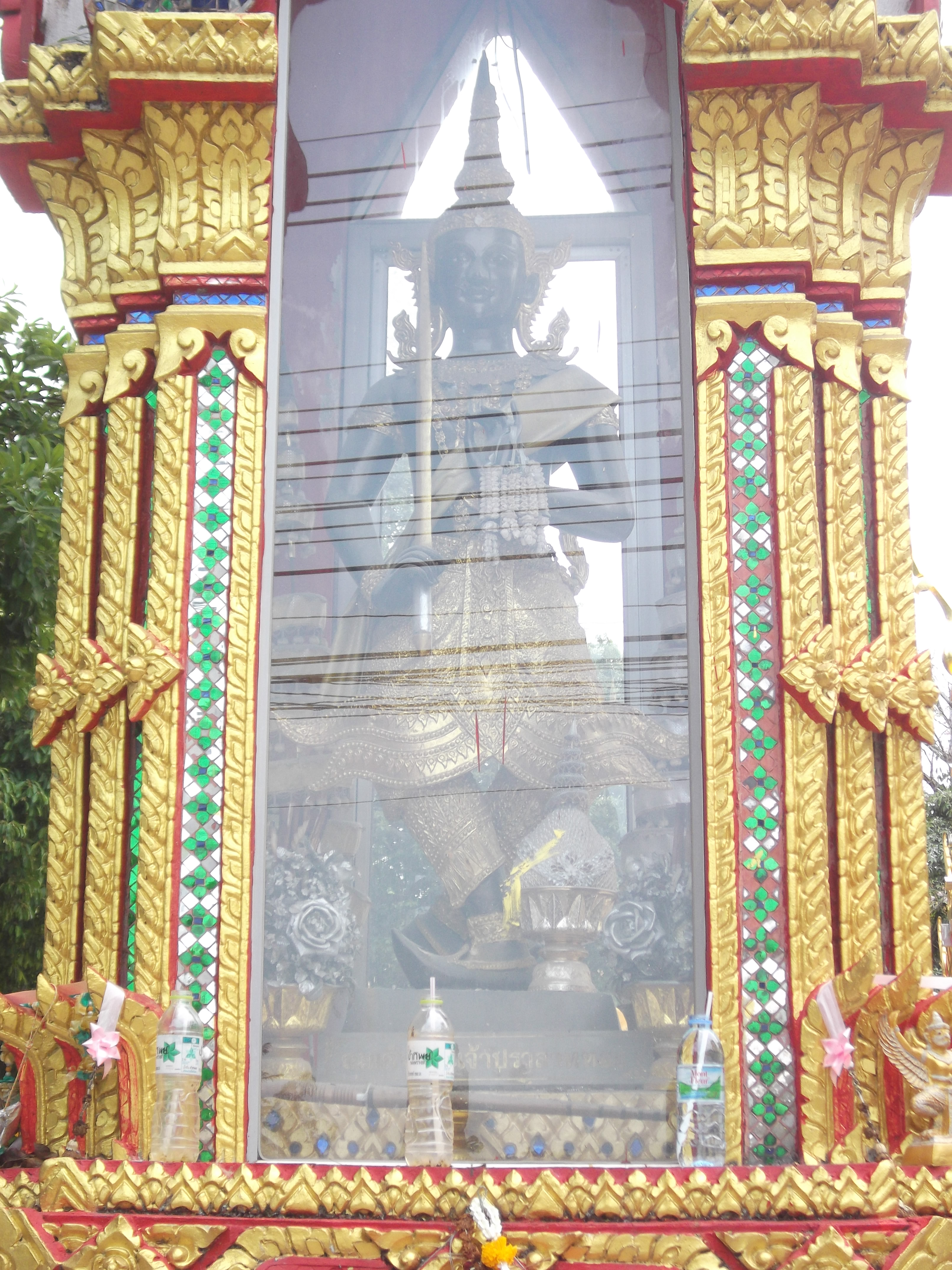
Prasat Thong as a deified idol at Wat Chumphon Nikayaram, Bang Pa-in, Ayutthaya

Prasat Thong Prasat Thong Dynasty Born: 1599 Died: 1655
Regnal titles
Preceded by Athittayawong	King of Ayutthaya; 1629–1655	Succeeded by Chai
