= Songtham =

Songtham ทรงธรรม
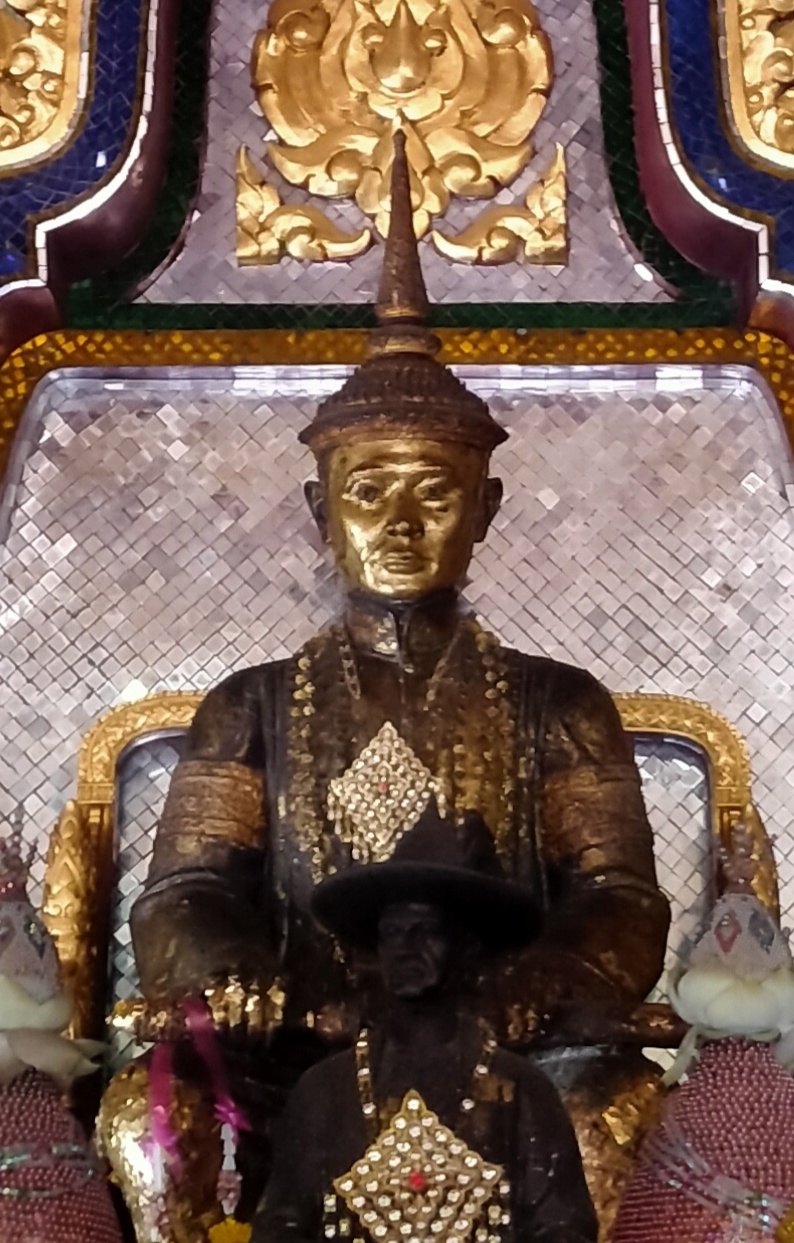
- Statue of King Songtham at the King Songtham Shrine, Wat Phra Phutthabat, Saraburi

King of Ayutthaya
- Reign: 1610/11 – 12 December 1628
- Predecessor: Si Saowaphak
- Successor: Chetthathirat
- Born: c. 1590
- Died: 12 December 1628
- Issue: Chetthathirat; Athittayawong; Phra Phanpi Si Sin; Sirithida
Names
- Songtham; Intharacha III
- Dynasty: Sukhothai
- Father: Ekathotsarot

King Songtham (Thai: สมเด็จพระเจ้าทรงธรรม) also known as King Borommaracha I (Thai: สมเด็จพระบรมราชาที่ ๑) was the king of the Ayutthaya Kingdom from 1611 to 1628, of the Sukhothai dynasty. His reign marked a period of prosperity for Ayutthaya following the restoration of independence from the Toungoo Empire after the reign of Bayinnaung. It also saw the beginning of expanded overseas trade, particularly with the Dutch and the Japanese. Songtham employed foreign mercenaries as royal guards; most notably the Japanese soldier Yamada Nagamasa (Okya Senaphimuk), commander of the Japanese volunteer corps.

== Origin ==
Inthraracha was the eldest son of King Ekathotsarot with his first class concubine. He was in the priesthood for 8 years before government servants asked him to leave and ascend the throne with the title Phrachao Songtham at the age of 29.

== Rebellion ==
King Ekathotsarot died in 1610/11 and was succeeded by King Si Saowaphak. Ruling less than a year, and showing no ability, he was murdered. Before his death, Japanese traders stormed the palace and took the king hostage. He was released only after promising not to harm any of the Japanese. The Japanese rebels then took the Sangharaja (Supreme Patriarch) as a hostage until they could flee the country.

Prince Chula Chakrabongse (1908–63) states, "the king went insane before he died...His younger son, who had killed the elder brother when their father was alive but helpless, now seized the throne." He became King Songtham, "The Pious" or "The Just", after he repented his act.

== Religious viewpoints ==
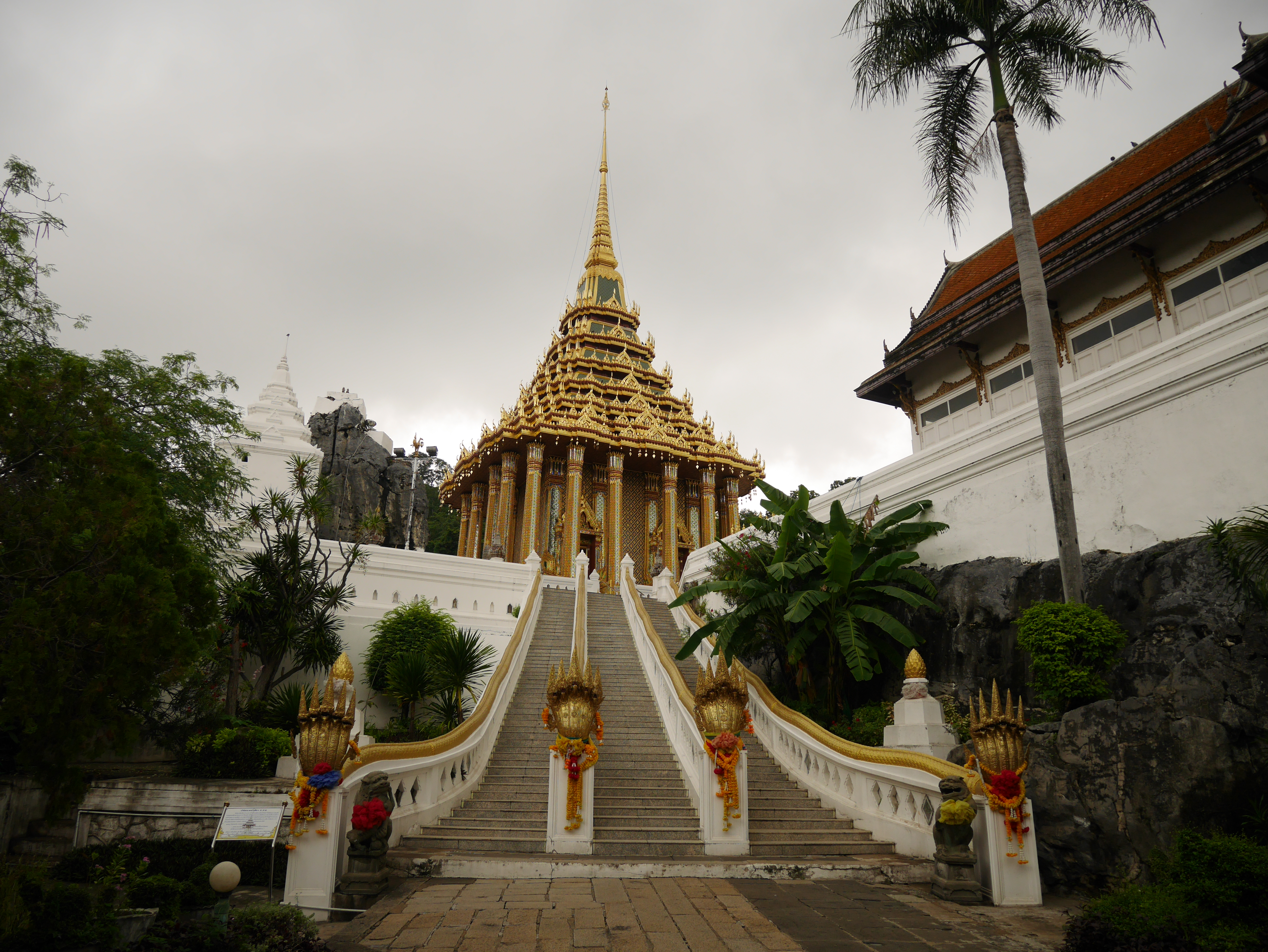
Wat Phra Phutthabat, Saraburi Province, constructed by King Songtham

Songtham was said to be very religious – both by the Siamese and van Vliet – as for his religious youth. His name Songtham was a posthumous reverence that means "maintaining the virtues". His reign was the glamorous time for Siamese peasants who were free from wars and suppression. The most prominent achievement in his reign was the discovery of Buddha's Footprint at Saraburi. Songtham ordered the construction of a temple, Wat Phra Phutthabat, over the footprint – the footprint itself can still be seen today. From Songtham onwards, Ayutthayan kings paid annual respect to the Buddha's Footprint in a grand river procession.

== Martial affairs ==
On martial affairs, however, King Songtham was less successful. In 1621 he himself led Siamese armies into Cambodia to bring the kingdom under control but was repelled by King Chey Chettha II of Oudong. Songtham sent his brother Uparaja Si Sin to invade again in 1622 and failed. During this invasion, King Songtham was supported by the Dutch East India Company. Two warships from Batavia were sent by Governor General Jan Pieterszoon Coen to assist the Siamese fleet. In 1622 Toungoo King Anaukpetlun took Tavoy (modern-day Dawei) away from the Siamese.

During his reign, Cambodia and Lanna revolted and became independent once more.

== Foreign relations ==
The English first arrived aboard the East India Company ship Globe in 1612, delivering a letter from King James I. They were given a place between the Japanese and Dutch in Ayutthaya, and were later joined by the French East India Company. An English ship called the Tryal sank in 1622 off the coast of western Australia after losing its course on the way to Ayutthaya. The ship's manifest noted gifts as 'spangles for the king of Siam'. In the following year, the English closed their factory.

Songtham signed a treaty with the Dutch on 12 June 1617. All trading however, was through the King's government. Colonies from China, Malay, Japan, Burma, Cambodia, Laos and Vietnam were tolerated.

Songtham sent four embassies (about 20 people each) to the Japanese shōgun in 1621, 1623, 1626 and 1629 to Shoguns Tokugawa Hidetada and Iemitsu.

In 1624, captain Fernando de Silva (not to be confused with governor of the Philippines Fernando de Silva) led a Spanish contingent to sack a Dutch ship near the Siamese shoreline. This enraged Songtham who held the Dutch in great preference and ordered the attacks and seizures of all the Spaniards. The Portuguese, who were united with the Spanish in a personal union at the time, were also caught up in this order and all the Iberians were technically disgraced from Siam after nearly a hundred years of royal support.

== Successor ==
Songtham wanted his son, Chettha, to succeed him, though he was young. He therefore asked Phraya Siworawong (later Prasat Thong), to protect him from danger. After Songtham's death, Siworawong arrested and executed all those who had been opposed to Songtham's wishes.

== Ancestry ==
Ancestors of Songtham

4. King Maha Thammaracha of Ayutthaya
2. King Ekathotsarot of Ayutthaya
10. King Maha Chakkraphat of Ayutthaya
5. Wisut Kasattri
11. Suriyothai
1. King Songtham of Ayutthaya

Songtham Sukhothai Dynasty Born: 1590 Died: 1628
Regnal titles
Preceded by Si Saowaphak	King of Ayutthaya; 1611–1628	Succeeded by Chetthathirat
