= Si Saowaphak =

Si Saowaphak ศรีเสาวภาคย์

King of Ayutthaya
- Reign: 1610/11-1611
- Predecessor: Ekathotsarot
- Successor: Songtham
- Born: 1585
- Died: 1610/11; Wat Khok Phraya, Ayutthaya, Ayutthaya Kingdom
Names
- Si Saowaphak; Sanphet IV
- Dynasty: Sukhothai
- Father: Ekathotsarot

Si Saowaphak (Thai: ศรีเสาวภาคย์, pronounced [sǐː sǎw.wā.pʰâːk]) or Sanphet IV (Thai: สรรเพชญ์ที่ ๔; r. 1610/11–1611) was a Thai, short-reigning king of Ayutthaya of the Sukhothai dynasty in 1610/11. Prince Si Saowaphak was the son of King Ekathotsarot and had an elder brother Prince Suthat who was made the Uparaja (Crown Prince) in 1607 but died before his father. Prince Si Saowaphak, as his father's second son, was expected to be invested the title of Crown Prince. However, Ekathotsarot never appointed him the Uparaja.

When Ekathotsarot died in 1610/11, Prince Si Saowaphak succeeded his father on the throne. Si Saowaphak was said to be without ability. In the same year the Japanese traders entered the palace, and held Si Saowaphak hostage until he vowed not to hurt any Japanese people. The Japanese then took the Sankharat (Supreme Patriarch) hostage to the mouth of Chao Phraya where they left for Japan.

Not long afterwards Si Saowaphak was murdered. The throne was given to Phra Ekathotsarot's son from a first class concubine, Phra Intharacha, who had been in the priesthood for 8 years. He assumed the title Phrachao Songtham.

Si Saowaphak Sukhothai Dynasty Born: 1585 Died: 1611
Regnal titles
| Preceded by Ekathotsarot | King of Ayutthaya; 1610–1611 | Succeeded by Songtham |
