= Si Suthammaracha =

Si Suthammaracha ศรีสุธรรมราชา

King of Ayutthaya
- Reign: 9 August 1656 – 26 October 1656
- Predecessor: Chao Fa Chai
- Successor: Narai
- Born: 1600
- Died: 26 October 1656; Wat Khok Phraya, Ayutthaya, Ayutthaya Kingdom
Names
- Si Suthammaracha; Sanphet VII
- Dynasty: Prasat Thong

Si Suthammaracha (Thai: ศรีสุธรรมราชา, Śrī Sudharmarājā) was the King of Ayutthaya from August 1656 to 26 October 1656 (2 months 17 Days). He was a younger brother of Prasat Thong.

Not long after Si Suthammaracha seized the throne from Chao Fa Chai, He quarrelled with his nephew, Prince Narai, They began to fight against each other, Si Suthammaracha was captured and executed after defeated in single combat with Narai on 26 October 1656.

== Struggle the throne ==
Upon King Prasat Thong’s death in 1656, Prince Chao Fa Chai, his eldest son, succeeded his father as King Sanpet VI.

However, it was a Thai tradition gave brothers a higher priority over sons in succession. Prince Si Suthammaracha, Chao Fa Chai's uncle, plotted with his nephew, Prince Narai, to bring Sanpet VI down. After nine months of ascension, Sanpet VI was executed following a coup. Narai and his uncle marched into the palace, and Si Suthammaracha crowned himself king. Si Suthammaracha appointed Narai as the Uparaja, or the Front Palace. However, Narai was also an ambitious prince and had requested Dutch support against his uncle. Si Suthammaracha’s rule was weak and he fell under the control of Chao Phraya Chakri, an ambitious mandarin who also wanted the throne.

In 1656, Narai and his uncle finally alienated each other. Si Suthammaracha lusted after Narai’s sister, Princess Ratcha Kanlayani. He ordered his soldiers to surround her residence and entered the house. The princess hid in the book chest and thus was moved to the Front Palace, where she met her brother.

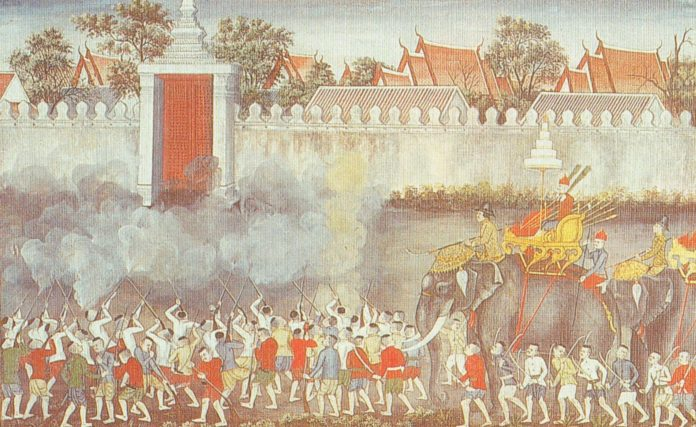
Coup d'état of Prince Narai to his uncle, King Si Suthammaracha. Painting made by Nai Im according to the royal decree of King Chulalongkorn of Siam in 1887.

Enraged at his uncle's behavior, Narai decided to take action. He drew his support from the Persian, and Japanese mercenaries that had been persecuted during his father's reign as well as the Dutch. He also had the support of his brothers and the Okya Sukhothai, a powerful nobleman. On the Day of Ashura, the Persians and Japanese stormed the palace. The prince engaged in single combat with his uncle, until the king fled to the Rear Palace. Si Suthammaracha was captured and was executed at Wat Khok Phraya on 26 October 1656.

Si Suthammaracha Prasat Thong Dynasty Born: 1600 Died: 26 October 1656
Regnal titles
Preceded by Chai	King of Ayutthaya; 1656	Succeeded by Narai
