= Ekathotsarot =

King of Siam (1605–1610/11)

Ekathotsarot เอกาทศรถ
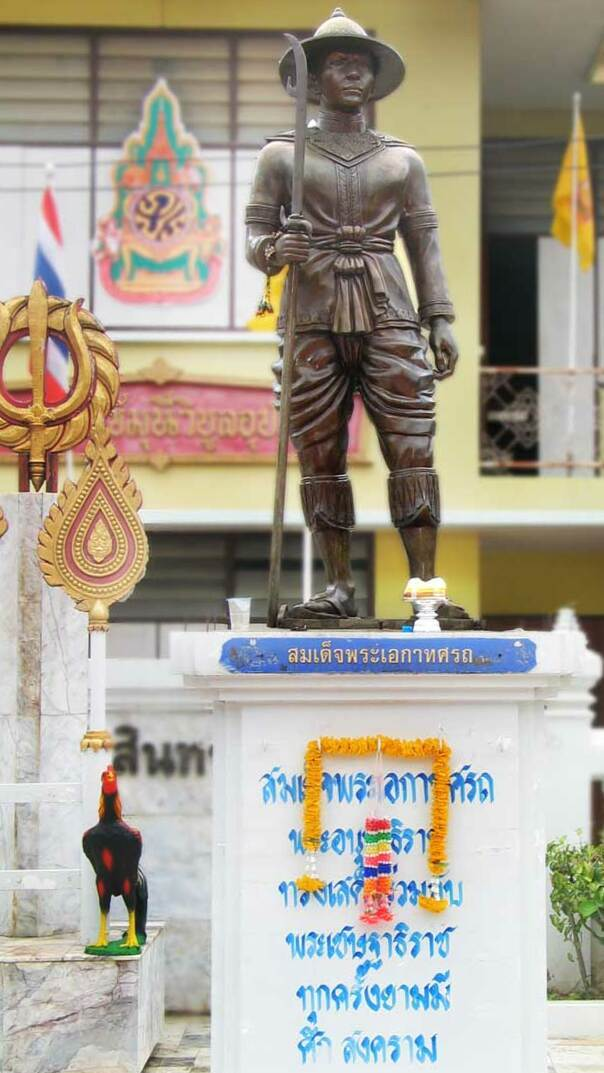
- Statue at Wat Pha Mok, Ang Thong

King of Ayutthaya
- Reign: 25 April 1605 – 1610/11
- Predecessor: Naresuan
- Successor: Si Saowaphak

Viceroy of Ayutthaya
- Tenure: 1590 – 25 April 1605
- Appointer: Naresuan
- Predecessor: Naresuan
- Successor: Suthat
- Born: 1560; Phitsanulok, Ayutthaya Kingdom
- Died: 1610/11 (aged 50–51); Ayutthaya, Ayutthaya Kingdom
- Issue: Suthat, Viceroy of Siam; Si Saowaphak; Songtham; Sisin; Ong Thong
Names
- Ekathotsarot; Sanphet III
- Dynasty: Sukhothai
- Father: Maha Thammaracha
- Mother: Wisutkasat

Ekathotsarot (Thai: เอกาทศรถ, pronounced [ʔēː.kāː.tʰót.sā.rót], Ekādaśaratha) or Sanphet III (Thai: สรรเพชญ์ที่ ๓); 1560 – 1610/11) was the King of Ayutthaya from 1605 to 1610/11 and overlord of Lan Na from 1605 to 1608/09, succeeding his brother Naresuan. His reign was mostly peaceful as Siam was a powerful state through the conquests of Naresuan. It was also during his reign that foreigners of various origin began to fill the mercenary corps. In particular, the king had a regiment of professional Japanese guards under the command of Yamada Nagamasa.

Right around Ekathotsarot's reign, the English first came to Siam in 1612.

== The White Prince ==
The White Prince was the son of Maha Thammarachathirat of Phitsanulok and Queen Wisutkasat. White Prince had an elder brother who was called The Black Prince, and an elder sister known as the Golden Princess.

In November 1563, Phitsanulok came under attack by King Bayinnaung of Burma. Faced with an overwhelming force, Maha Thammarachathirat surrendered in January 1564, and agreed to join Bayinnaung's assault on Ayutthaya. With Phitsanulok's help, Bayinnaung forced King Maha Chakkraphat of Ayutthaya to surrender in February 1564. Bayinnaung brought back the Black Prince and White Prince, along with Ayutthaya king Maha Chakkraphat. The two princes were educated and overseen by Bayinnaung, along with other captive princes.

When Ayutthaya revolted in May 1568, Maha Thammarachathirat remained loyal to Bayinnaung, and became the vassal king of Siam when Bayinnaung's forces retook Ayutthaya in August 1569. The Black and White Prince then returned to Ayutthaya in 1571.

== The Second King ==
Prince Ekathotsarot joined his brother Naresuan in various wars with the Burmese. Naresuan declared independence in May 1584, and fought off a series of Burmese invasions from 1584 to 1593. In 1590, Maha Thammarachathirat died. Naresuan was crowned as the King of Ayutthaya while Ekathotsarot was made Uparaja but with equal honor to Naresuan (As in the case of Mongkut and Pinklao).

The end of this series of Burmese invasions came in January 1593. Crown Prince of Burma, Mingyi Swa invaded Siam once more. He conducted an elephant duel with Naresuan, and was slain in the armed conflict.

In 1595, Pegu faced rebellions by various tributaries and royal princes. Naresuan planned a massive invasion of Pegu but the city was taken beforehand by the Lord of Toungoo, with the support of Arakan. The efforts to capture Toungoo failed in May 1600, and Naresuan decided to retreat. In Lanna, however, a conflict arose between Nawrahta Minsaw, the Burmese king of Lanna, and Phraya Ram, a Siamese-installed Lanna noble. Naresuan sent Ekathotsarot to claim the conflicts by dividing Lanna into two parts.

Naresuan died in 1605 while planning to invade the Burmese Shan states. Ekathotsarot was crowned as his successor.

== King of Siam ==
Upon his coronation, the Ayutthaya kingdom had reached the maximum extent. However, immediately after the coronation, the Lanna kingdom broke away.

In 1612, an English expedition arrived in Siam carrying a letter from King James I of England requesting permission for English merchants to trade in Siam. The King warmly welcomed the party and granted them a station for trading as well as presenting them with lavish gifts. In 1613–1614, Burmese king Anaukpetlun invaded the Tenasserim coast. He gained Tavoy but was driven back with heavy losses at Mergui. (The Burmese then invaded Lan Na in April 1614. Lan Na sought help from Lan Xang but no help ever came, and Chiang Mai fell to the Burmese in December 1614. Note that according to Damrong, in 1618 Siam and Burma reached an agreement in which Burma would control Martaban and Siam would control Chiang Mai. But international scholarship accepts that Lan Na again became a Burmese vassal.

=== Mission to the Dutch Republic ===
During the reign of Ekathotsarot, a Siamese embassy reached the Dutch city of The Hague, in 1608. The embassy of 16 was brought to the Dutch Republic by Admiral Cornelis Matelief de Jonge on board the Oranje, leaving Bantam on January 28, 1608. The embassy arrived in The Hague on September 10, 1608, and met with Maurice of Nassau, Prince of Orange. This visit coincided with the application for a patent of the telescope by the Dutch eyeglass maker Hans Lippershey, and this new device was mentioned at the end of a diplomatic report on the Siamese Embassy, Ambassades du Roy de Siam envoyé à l'Excellence du Prince Maurice, arrive a La Haye, le 10. September, 1608 ("Embassy of the King of Siam sent to his Excellence Prince Maurice, September 10, 1608"), which soon diffused across Europe.

Following the embassy, a treaty was concluded between the Republic and Siam in 1617.

=== Foreign mercenaries ===
Ekathotsarot's reign saw the influx of foreigners into Siam as traders and mercenaries. Ekathotsarot established Krom Asas ('committee of volunteers', i.e. volunteered regiments) of foreign soldiers, for example; Krom Asa Mon, Krom Asa Cham, Krom Asa Yipun (Japanese mercenaries), and Krom Asa Maen Puen (literally 'committee of volunteer marksman' – the Portuguese and Dutch). Ekathotsarot had close relations with the Tokugawa shogunate under Tokugawa Ieyasu who commissioned Red Seal Ships to Siam. Around this time the Siamese metallurgists learned the arts of forging mortars from Westerners and combined with traditional methods giving rise to the praised Siamese mortars known for their qualities.

=== Prince Suthat ===
Ekathotsarot had two legitimate sons: Prince Suthat and Prince Sri Saowabhak. Prince Suthat was invested with the title of Uparaja in 1607. However, only four months later, Prince Suthat asked his father to release a prisoner; but instead angered his father, who accused Prince Suthat of a rebellion. Prince Suthat committed suicide by poison the same night, much to the grief of Ekathotsarot. This is one of the most mysterious historical scenes of Siamese history, as no one knows who was the prisoner Prince Suthat tried to free, nor why Ekathotsarot was so angry. Some historians hypothesized that the prisoner was one of the powerful nobles whose power was a challenge to the monarchy. The nature of Prince Suthat's death was also disputed, as he may have been poisoned by someone else.

Whatever the fact may be, the Prince Suthat incident laid the grounds for future princely struggles that would plague Ayutthaya for about another century. As his son was dead, Ekathotsarot did not appoint his second son, Prince Sri Saowabhak, Uparaja, as expected. It was said that Ekathotsarot died of depression following the Prince Suthat incident, in 1610/11. Prince Sri Saowabhak succeeded to the throne anyway.

== Notes ==
Ekathotsarot Sukhothai Dynasty Born: c. 1550s Died: 1610
Regnal titles
Preceded by Naresuan	King of Ayutthaya; 1605–1610	Succeeded by Si Saowaphak
Preceded by Naresuan	Viceroy of Ayutthaya; 1590–1605	Succeeded by Sutat
Preceded by Naresuan	Ruler of Phitsanulok; 1590–1605	Position abolished
