= Ramrachathirat =

King of Ayutthaya from 1395 to 1409

Ramrachathirat รามราชาธิราช

King of Ayutthaya
- Reign: 1395–1409
- Predecessor: Ramesuan
- Successor: Intharacha
- Born: 1356
- Died: Unknown
- Dynasty: Uthong
- Father: Ramesuan

Ramrachathirat (Thai: รามราชาธิราช, Rāmarājādhirāja) was a king of Ayutthaya, an ancient kingdom in Thailand.

A son of Ramesuan and member of the House of Uthong, he succeeded his father to the throne of Ayutthaya in 1393. He reigned until 1395 when he was deposed in a coup by Inracha, his uncle from the House of Suphannaphum. This coup marked the end of Lawo-Ayothaya clan and the rise of Suphannaphum clan, which would rule over Ayutthaya for almost two hundred years.

Historical sources vary in relation to the fate of the dethroned monarch. Some say he was banished. Some say he was executed.

== Name ==
List of abbreviations in this article
Abbreviation	For
BE	Thai Buddhist Era
CE	Common Era
LE	Lesser Era
LP	Luang Prasoet Chronicle
VV	Van Vliet Chronicle

He is merely known as Ram (Thai: ราม; "Rāma") in most historical sources, including the Bradley Chronicle, the British Museum Chronicle, LP, the Phan Channumat Chronicle, the Phonnarat Chronicle, and the Royal Autograph Chronicle.

VV, a Dutch document written by Jeremias van Vliet in 1640 CE, refers to him as Prae Rhaem (Thai: พระราม; "Divine Rāma").

But modern documents often refer to him as Ramracha (Thai: รามราชา; "Rāma the Lord") or Ramrachathirat (Thai: รามราชาธิราช; "Rāma the Supreme Lord of Lords"). The latter is the name accepted by the Historical Revision Commission of Thailand (Thai: คณะกรรมการชำระประวัติศาสตร์ไทย).

== Early life and ascension to the throne ==
All historical sources state that Ram was a son of Ramesuan, a king of the Ayutthaya Kingdom from the House of Uthong.

Ramesuan gained the throne in 750 LE (1931 BE, 1388/89 CE) after carrying out a violent coup against Thong Lan, a young son of his maternal uncle, Boromrachathirat I from the House of Suphannaphum.

According to LP, Ram succeeded to the throne of Ayutthaya upon the demise of his father, Ramesuan, in 757 LE (1938 BE, 1395/96 CE).

VV says Ram was 21 years of age when he ascended the throne. Based on this information, he was possibly born in 718 LE (1899 BE, 1356/57 CE).

VV describes Ram as having "low intelligence" (German: wenig Weisheit), saying he made a poor decision by sending Inracha, a relative of Thong Lan, to rule the principality of Suphan Buri, allowing him to accumulate power that would enable him to oust Ram from the throne in the future. The document also says that, throughout his reign, Ram had no accomplishment worth mentioning.

== Foreign relations ==
=== China ===
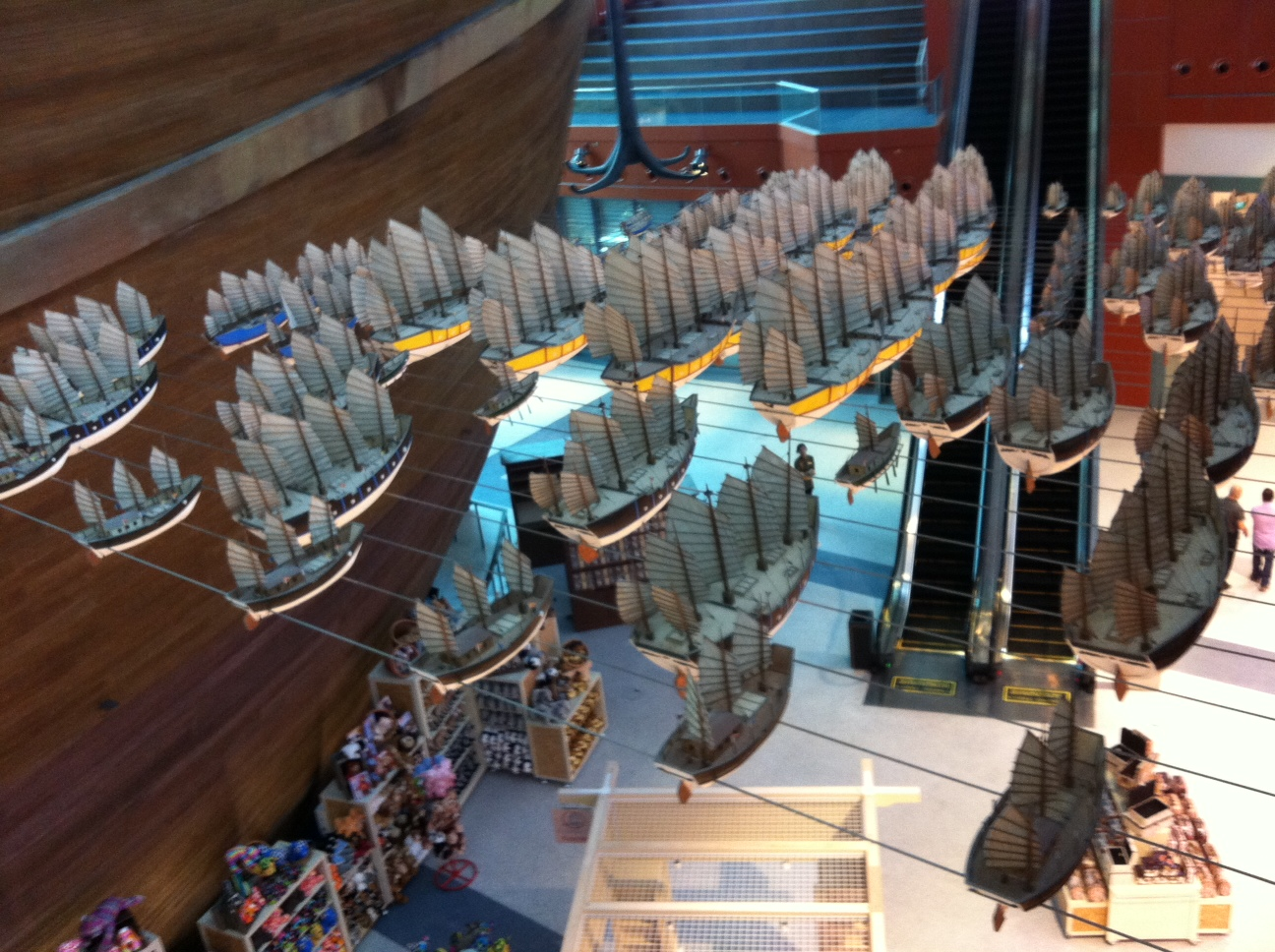
A model of a Chinese treasure fleet, displayed at the Maritime Experiential Museum, Singapore.

Chinese documents say, during the reign of Ram, the royal court of Ayutthaya sent its first envoy to China in 1940 BE (1397/98 CE).

However, China gave more importance to Inracha, Ram's relative who ruled Suphan Buri. Inracha had personal relationship with the Chinese imperial court and once visited the country in 1920 BE (1377/78 CE). The imperial court of China even honoured him as king. This made Ram grow suspicious of him.

The third treasure fleet sent by China to Southeast Asia arrived in Ayutthaya in 1410 CE, perfectly around the time Inracha staged a coup against Ram. Historian Suchit Wongthet (สุจิตต์ วงษ์เทศ) believed the fleet, which was led by Admiral Zheng He, was sent for political purposes, probably to support Inracha as a new monarch of Ayutthaya, so that Ayutthaya would become a dependency of China.

=== Sukhothai ===
The northern kingdom of Sukhothai appears to have been a vassal state of Ayutthaya for a period of time during the reign of Ram. A surviving stele, Inscription 38 (Thai: จารึกหลักที่ ๓๘), erected in 1940 BE (1397/98 CE), contains a criminal law which Ayutthaya imposed upon Sukhothai, indicating the vassal status of Sukhothai. This inscription is the only known legislative text engraved on stone emanating from any of the Southeast Asian kingdoms and remains a document of peculiar importance for the study of the legal history of the region.

Historical documents from Northern Thailand state that King Mahathammaracha III of Sukhothai marched his royal army to assist Lord Yi Kum Kam (Thai: ยี่กุมกาม) in seizing the throne of Lan Na from King Sam Fang Kaen (Thai: สามฝั่งแกน). The event took place in 1945 BE (1402/03 CE), according to Jinakālamālī. Historian Prasert na Nagara (Thai: ประเสริฐ ณ นคร) expressed the opinion that this means Sukhothai had already been independent from Ayutthaya by that time.

== Removal from the throne ==
In 771 LE (1952 BE, 1409/10 CE), Ram was removed from the throne of Ayutthaya by his relative, Inracha, the ruler of Suphan Buri. According to LP, Inracha staged a coup against Ram at the initiative of a person called chao senabodi (Thai: เจ้าเสนาบดี). Ram was in conflict with chao senabodi and ordered his arrest. Having fled to Patha Khu Cham (Thai: ปท่าคูจาม), chao senabodi persuaded Inracha to bring troops from Suphan Buri to Ayutthaya and seize the throne. Inracha succeeded in his enterprise, became king of Ayutthaya, and banished Ram to Patha Khu Cham. Ram remained there until his death, of which the date and time are not known.

As the literal interpretation of the term chao senabodi gave various outcomes, historian Damrong Rajanubhab believed it refers to a military commander. Piyanat Bunnak (Thai: ปิยนาถ บุนนาค) from the Royal Society of Thailand expressed the opinion that he was a chancellor (prime minister).

In documents produced during the Bangkok era, chao senabodi is referred to by the title of the chancellor for military affairs, (Note: After the administrative reform in the reign of Boromtrailokkanat, the government of Ayutthaya had two chancellors or prime ministers (Thai: อัครมหาเสนาบดี): one responsible for civil affairs, called samuhanayok (Thai: สมุหนายก); the other, for military affairs, called samuhakalahom (Thai: สมุหกลาโหม).) Chao Phraya Mahasenabodi (Thai: เจ้าพระยามหาเสนาบดี), despite the fact that such title did not yet exist at his time.

The Minor Wars Chronicle states that Ram was just banished because Inracha did not want to kill his own relative.

VV gives a slightly different piece of information regarding the coup, stating that after Ram had reigned in Ayutthaya for three years, Inracha marched his troops in from Suphan Buri (written Soupanna Boury in the document), successfully seized the throne of Ayutthaya, and put Ram to death.

The Magadhi Chronicle and the Buddhist Councils Chronicle also state that Inracha did have Ram executed.

This coup was part of a series of conflicts between the royal houses of Uthong (of which Ram was a member) and Suphannaphum (to which Inracha belonged). The two clans had long struggled with each other for the throne of Ayutthaya. But the victory of Inracha on this occasion would allow Suphannaphum to remain in power over the Kingdom of Ayutthaya for almost the next two centuries.

== Bibliography ==
- Griswold, A. B.; Na Nakhǭn, Prasœ̄t (1969). "Epigraphic and Historical Studies No. 4: A Law Promulgated By the King of Ayudhyā in 1397 A.D" (PDF). Journal of the Siam Society. 57 (1). Siam Society Heritage Trust: 109–148.
- Kasētsiri, Chānwit (2005). Phetlœ̄t‘anan, Thamrongsak (ed.). 'Ayutthayā prawattisāt læ kānmư̄ang อยุธยา ประวัติศาสตร์และการเมือง [Ayutthaya: History and Politics] (in Thai) (4th ed.). Bangkok: Foundation for Promotion of Social Sciences and Humanities Textbooks Project. ISBN 9749157273.
- Na Nakhǭn, Prasœ̄t (2006). Prawattisāt Bettalet ประวัติศาสตร์เบ็ดเตล็ด [Historical Miscellanea] (in Thai). Bangkok: Matichon. ISBN 9743236007.
- Phrarātchaphongsāwadān chabap phrarātchahatthalēkhā lem nưng พระราชพงศาวดาร ฉบับพระราชหัตถเลขา เล่ม ๑ [Royal Autograph Chronicle, Volume 1] (in Thai) (8th ed.). Bangkok: Fine Arts Department of Thailand. 1991. ISBN 9744171448.
- Phrarātchaphongsāwadān krung sayām chabap mǭ bratle พระราชพงศาวดารกรุงสยาม ฉบับหมอบรัดเล [Doctor Bradley Royal Chronicle of Siam] (in Thai) (2nd ed.). Bangkok: Khōsit. 2006. ISBN 9749489993.
- Phrarātchaphongsāwadān krung sī 'ayutthayā chabap phan čhannumāt (čhœ̄m) læ 'ēkkasān 'ư̄n พระราชพงศาวดารกรุงศรีอยุธยา ฉบับพันจันทนุมาศ (เจิม) และเอกสารอื่น [Phan Channumat (Choem)'s Royal Chronicle of Ayutthaya, and Other Documents] (in Thai). Nonthaburī: Sī Panyā. 2010. ISBN 9786167146089.
- Prachum phongsāwadān chabap kānčhanāphisēk lem nưng ประชุมพงศาวดาร ฉบับกาญจนาภิเษก เล่ม ๑ [Golden Jubilee Collection of Historical Archives, Volume 1] (in Thai). Bangkok: Fine Arts Department of Thailand. 1999. ISBN 9744192151.
- Prachum phongsāwadān phāk thī pǣtsip sǭng rư̄ang phrarātchaphongsāwadān krung sayām čhāk tonchabap khǭng britit miosīam krung london ประชุมพงศาวดาร ภาคที่ ๘๒ เรื่อง พระราชพงศาวดารกรุงสยามจากต้นฉบับของบริติชมิวเซียม กรุงลอนดอน [Collection of Historical Archives, Volume 82: A Royal Chronicle of the Kingdom of Siam from the Original Manuscripts of the British Museum, London] (in Thai) (2nd ed.). Bangkok: Fine Arts Department of Thailand. 1994. ISBN 9744190256.
- Princess Maha Chakri Sirindhorn Foundation (2011). Nāmānukrom phramahākasat thai นามานุกรมพระมหากษัตริย์ไทย [Directory of Thai Kings] (in Thai). Bangkok: Princess Maha Chakri Sirindhorn Foundation. ISBN 9786167308258.
- Somdet Phra Phonnarat (Kǣo) (1932). Čhunlayutthakārawong Phūk Sǭng จุลยุทธการวงศ ผูก ๒ [Chronicle of Minor Wars, Second Bundle] (in Thai). Bangkok: Sōphon Phiphat Thanākǭn.
- Somdet Phra Phonnarat (Kǣo) (2015). Phakdīkham, Sānti (ed.). Phrarātchaphongsāwadān chabap somdet phra phonnarat wat phra chēttuphon trūatsǭp chamra čhāk 'ēkkasān tūakhīan พระราชพงศาวดาร ฉบับสมเด็จพระพนรัตน์วัดพระเชตุพน ตรวจสอบชำระจากเอกสารตัวเขียน [Royal Chronicle: Version by His Holiness Phonnarat of Wat Phra Chettuphon, Checked Against Manuscripts] (in Thai). Bangkok: Rama I Scholarship Foundation Under His Majesty's Patronage. ISBN 9786169235101.
- Van Vliet, Jeremias (2003). Wongthēt, Sučhit (ed.). Phongsāwadā krung sī 'ayutthayā chabap wan walit phutthasakkarāt song phan nưng rǭi pǣtsip sǭng พงศาวดารกรุงศรีอยุธยา ฉบับวันวลิต พ.ศ. ๒๑๘๒ [Van Vliet Chronicle of Ayutthaya, 2182 BE (1640 CE)] (in Thai). Translated by Wanāsī Sāmanasēn (2nd ed.). Bangkok: Matichon. ISBN 9743229221.
- Wongthēt, Sučhit (2014-11-07). "Čhīn tī sǭng nā" จีนตีสองหน้า? [Was China two-faced?]. Sujitwongthes.com (in Thai). Bangkok: Matichon.

Ramrachathirat House of Uthong Born: ca 718 LE (1356/57 CE) Died: ?
Regnal titles
Preceded by Ramesuan	King of Ayutthaya; 757 LE (1395/96 CE) – 771 LE (1409/10 CE)	Succeeded by Inracha
