= Samphao Lom =

Samphao Lom สำเภาล่ม
- Tambon
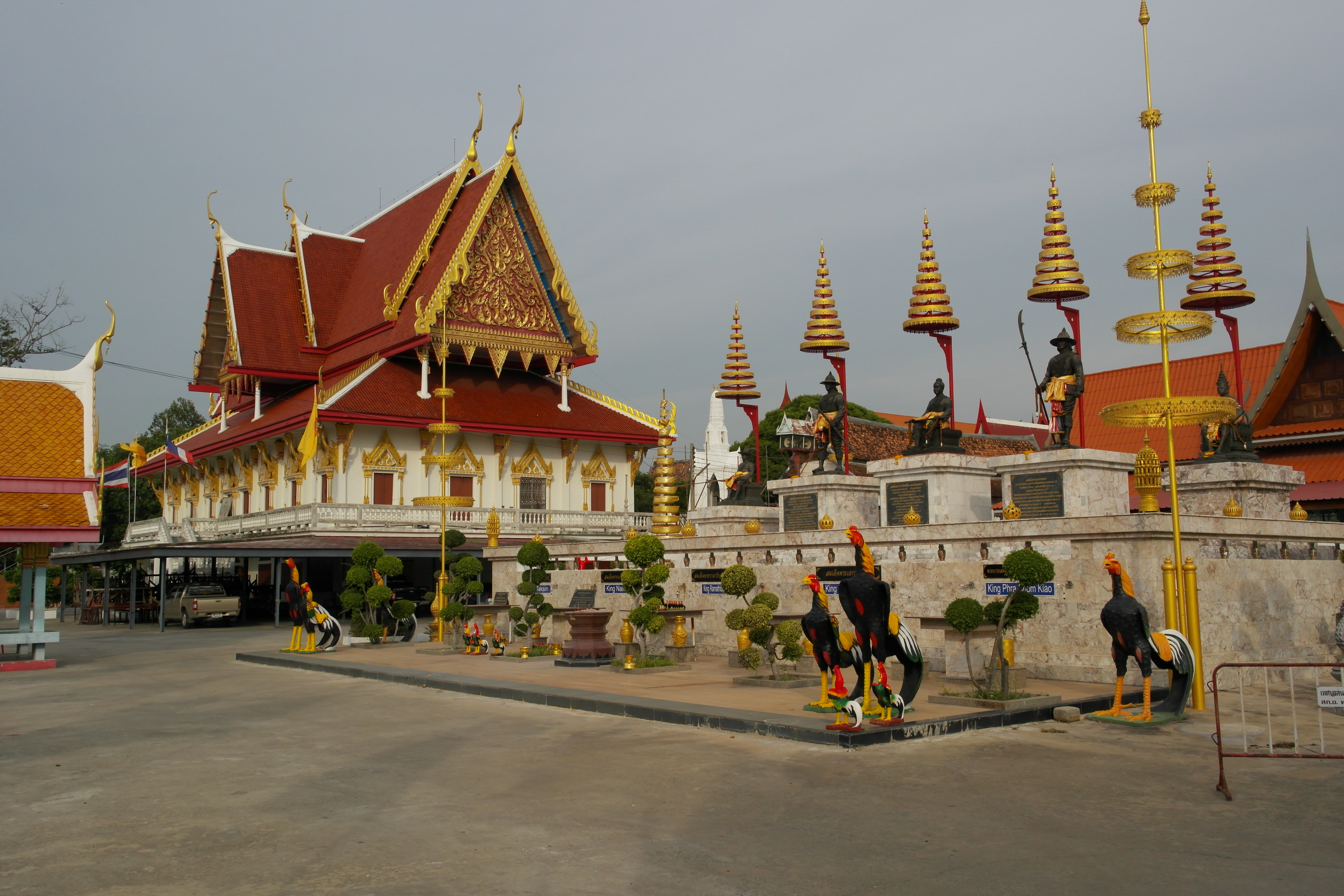
- Five Kings Monument, Wat Phutthaisawan (from left to right: Taksin, Ekathotsarot, U-Thong, Naresuan, Chulalongkorn)
- Interactive map of Samphao Lom
- Country: Thailand
- Province: Phra Nakhon Si Ayutthaya
- Amphoe: Phra Nakhon Si Ayutthaya

Government
  - Mayor: Somkiat Phitak

Population (1998)
  - Total: 6,368
- Time zone: UTC+7 (ICT)
- Postcode: 13000
- Area code: (+66) 02

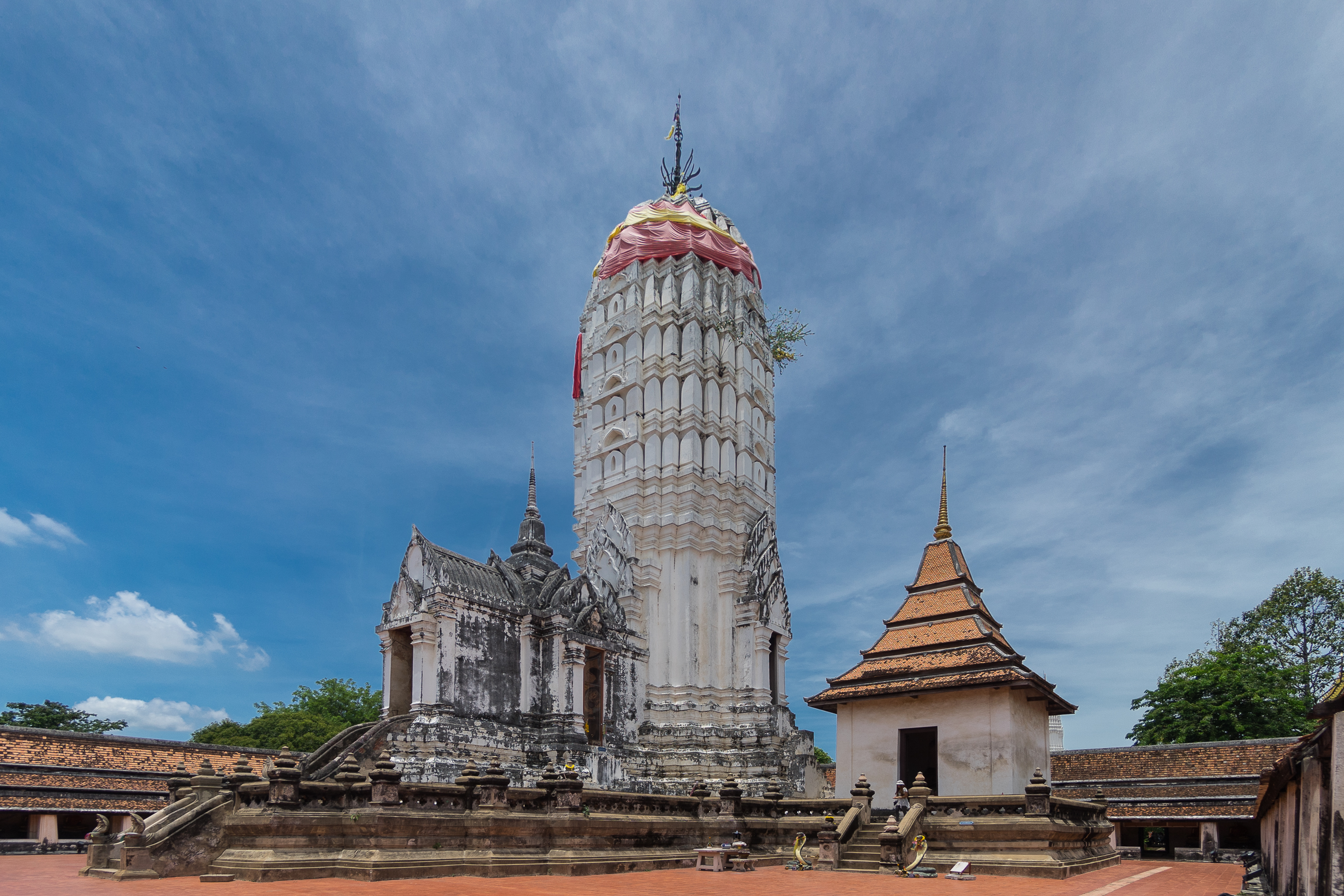
Main prang (Khmer style stupa) of Wat Phutthaisawan

Samphao Lom (Thai: สำเภาล่ม, pronounced [sǎm.pʰǎo.lôm]) is a tambon (subdistrict) of Phra Nakhon Si Ayutthaya District, the capital district of Phra Nakhon Si Ayutthaya Province.

== History and toponymy ==
Its name, "Samphao Lom'', literally means "capsized junk." This area lies at the confluence of the Pa Sak and Chao Phraya rivers, with terrain shaped like a three-way junction. The strong currents have made it a place where boats, ships, and junks frequently capsize and sink, a phenomenon that has continued since Ayutthaya was the capital of Thailand more than 600 years ago.

Legend has it that the ship of Chinese princess Soi Dok Mak capsized and sank in front of the nearby Wat Phanan Choeng. Another legend claims that the wrecks came from Chinese junks that sank while trading in the area. Even today, accidents still occur frequently, and when the water level recedes, many shipwrecks can reportedly be seen.

Records from the Ayutthaya period state that floating houses lined the waterways from the front of Wat Phanan Choeng to Wat Chaiwatthanaram, a distance of about 3 km (1.9 mi). Floating houses also extended around Ayutthaya island, which was essentially downtown Ayutthaya surrounded by water on all sides. At that time, this area was considered a major floating market, with a network of waterways extending the floating houses into the river as far as eight blocks. It is estimated that there were as many as 10,000 floating houses. Ships often carried non-timber forest products or inland products from Tak and Phetchabun for trade. A Chinese community was located around Wat Phanan Choeng, and a multi-ethnic expatriate community, including Portuguese, Dutch, Japanese, and Cham Muslims, was permitted by the Ayutthaya royal court to settle on both sides of the Chao Phraya river below Wat Phanan Choeng. Junks were frequently anchored for trading, and the area also served as the royal junk dock on the way to the Pa Sak river.

According to Phraya Boranrajathanin, the governor of Monthon Khrung Kao (the official name of Phra Nakhon Si Ayutthaya Province during King Chulalongkorn's reign) and a key archaeologist of that era, the land of downtown Ayutthaya was originally not an island. It resembled a cape extending from Thung Hantra (Hantra Field) in the west to the Chao Phraya river, which flows from the north and loops southward to in front of Wat Phanan Choeng. This cape-shaped land was eventually surrounded by water on three sides.

On the eastern side, there was a ditch called Khu Khue Na, which drained from Hua Ro (now a populated area and historic market near the northeastern edge by Chandra Kasem Palace) into the Chao Phraya river in front of Wat Phanan Choeng. During King Maha Thammaracha's reign, he ordered the excavation to widen this waterway. Over time, the current became faster and stronger, eroding the banks and eventually connecting with the Pa Sak river as it exists today. Consequently, downtown Ayutthaya became fully surrounded by water, forming what has been called "Ayutthaya Island" ever since.

Even today, the Samphao Lom area is still prone to accidents, with boats and ships frequently capsizing and sinking.

== Geography ==
Samphao Lom is considered to be the central area in the lower part of Phra Nakhon Si Ayutthaya District, which is outside the Ayutthaya island.

The geography of Samphao Lom is a lowland, therefore, it is suitable for rice cultivation. There is waterlogging in the rainy season. There was a flood for about 2–3 months with the Chao Phraya River flowing through. Without a forest in the area.

Neighbouring subdistricts are, clockwise from north, Pratu Chai, Ko Rian, Khlong Takhian, and Pak Kran. All of them were in its district.

== Administration ==
Samphao Lom is administered by the Subdistrict Administrative Organization (SAO) Samphao Lom (องค์การบริหารส่วนตำบลสำเภาล่ม).

The area also consists of 11 administrative muban (village)

No.	Name	Thai
1.	Ban Protuket (Note: Ban Protuket, literally translated as "Portuguese hamlet", refers to community of Portuguese who settled and lived or served in the Ayutthaya Kingdom. Today, it has become one of Ayutthaya's important graves and archaeological sites along the Chao Phraya River known as "Portuguese Village". In this case, its name has also become the name of the administrative village in the subdistrict.)	บ้านโปรตุเกส
2.	Ban Din	บ้านดิน
3.	Ban Khan Ruea	บ้านคานเรือ
4.	Ban Bang Kaja	บ้านบางกะจะ
5.	Ban Samphao Lom	บ้านสำเภาล่ม
6.	Ban Khlong Khu Cham	บ้านคลองคูจาม
7.	Ban Khlong Khu Cham	บ้านคลองคูจาม
8.	Ban Wat Phutthaisawan	บ้านวัดพุทไธศวรรย์
9.	Ban Dong Tan	บ้านดงตาล
10.	Ban Yuan	บ้านญวน
11.	Ban Yuan	บ้านญวน

The emblem of Samphao Lom SAO shows a junk sailing on the water surface.

== Population ==
The residents of Samphao Lom prefer to set up houses on two banks of the khlong (canal) and on the roadside. Most of the houses are close to each other. The houses were distributed in groups along the length of the road.

In 1998 it had a total population of 6,368 people.

== Places ==
- Wat Phutthaisawan
- Portuguese Village
- Wat Khun Phrom
- Saint Joseph Catholic Church, Ayutthaya
