= Thong Lan =

Thong Lan ทองลัน
- Painting from the 2004 book Death date of 66 Kings

King of Ayutthaya
- Reign: Seven days in 750 LE (1388/89 CE)
- Predecessor: Phra Ngua
- Successor: Ramesuan
- Born: c. 735 LE (1373/74 CE)
- Died: 750 LE (1388/89 CE); Wat Khok Phraya (in present-day Phra Nakhon Si Ayutthaya Province, Thailand)
- Dynasty: Suphannaphum
- Father: Borommarachathirat I

King Thong Lan (Thai: สมเด็จพระเจ้าทองลัน) was a king of Ayutthaya, an ancient kingdom in Thailand.

A son of Borommarachathirat I and a member of the Suphannaphum Dynasty, Thong Lan succeeded his father to the throne of Ayutthaya in 750 LE (1931 BE, 1388/89 CE) at the age of 15. Having reigned for only seven days, he was deposed and executed in a coup by Ramesuan, his relative from the Uthong Dynasty.

Thong Lan was the first monarch of Ayutthaya to be executed.

== Name ==
List of abbreviations in this article
Abbreviation	For
BE	Thai Buddhist Era
CE	Common Era
LE	Lesser Era

The child king is known as Thong Lan (Thai: ทองลัน; IPA: [tʰɔ̃ːŋ˧.lä̃n˧]) in most historical sources, including the British Museum Chronicle, the Luang Prasoet Chronicle, and the Phan Channumat Chronicle.

Thong (Thai: ทอง) means "gold". Lan (Thai: ลัน) is an archaic word whose meaning is not known.

Historian Suchit Wongthet (Thai: สุจิตต์ วงษ์เทศ) expressed the opinion that lan here is an old Thai–Lao term which encyclopediae say refers to "eel trap made of bamboo". The historian stated that naming a person after an animal trapping device was an ancient practice, citing the personal name of King Rama I, Thong Duang (Thai: ทองด้วง), which means "golden snare".

The Bradley Chronicle, however, says the name of the boy king was Thong Lan (Thai: ท้องลั่น; IPA: [tʰɔ̃ːŋ˦˥.lä̃n˥˩]; "cry of stomach").

Thong Lan is known as Thong Chan (Thai: ทองจันทร์; IPA: [tʰɔ̃ːŋ˧.t͡ɕä̃n˧]; "golden moon" or "moon gold") in the Phonnarat Chronicle and the Royal Autograph Chronicle.

In the Minor Wars Chronicle, he is referred to in Pali as Suvaṇṇacanda (in Thai script: สุวณฺณจนฺท; "golden moon").

The Van Vliet Chronicle, a Dutch document written by Jeremias Van Vliet in 1640 CE, refers to him as Thong t'Jan.

== Family ==
All historical documents say Thong Lan was a son of Borommarachathirat I.

== Life ==
=== Political background ===
The Kingdom of Ayutthaya was jointly founded by the royal houses of Uthong and Suphannaphum, which were related through marriage. The first monarch of Ayutthaya, Ramathibodi I, was from Uthong. He appointed his son, Ramesuan, the ruler of Lop Buri. He also appointed Boromrachathirat I, his relative from Suphannaphum, the ruler of Suphan Buri.

In 731 LE (1912 BE, 1369/70 CE), Ramathibodi I died. Ramesuan came from Lop Buri and succeeded to the throne of Ayutthaya.

In 732 LE (1913 BE, 1370/71 CE), Borommarachathirat I marched his army from Suphan Buri to Ayutthaya. Ramesuan then "presented" the throne to him and returned to Lop Buri as before.

=== Reign ===
In 750 LE (1931 BE, 1388/89 CE), Boromrachathirat I led his army to attack Chakangrao. But he fell ill and died en route. His son, Thong Lan, then succeeded to the throne of Ayutthaya.

Thai chronicles state that Thong Lan was 15 years of age when he ascended the throne in 750 LE (1931 BE, 1388/89 CE). Based on this information, Thong Lan was possibly born in 735 LE (1916 BE, 1373/74 CE). But the Dutch document Van Vliet Chronicle says he was 17 when ascending the throne.

After Thong Lan had reigned for merely seven days, Ramesuan came from Lop Buri with his army and seized the throne. Ramesuan had Thong Lan put to death at a Buddhist temple called Wat Khok Phraya (Thai: วัดโคกพระยา). Thong Lan was killed by hitting his neck with a Sandalwood club, a traditional means for executing a royal person. Ramesuan then became king of Ayutthaya for the second time.

Historian Damrong Rajanubhab introduced a theory that Boromrachathirat I brought his army to Ayutthaya in 732 LE because of certain political problems that Ramesuan was unable to deal with. The two might have agreed that Ramesuan would let Boromrachathirat rule Ayutthaya and the latter would declare the former his successor. Ramesuan thus presented the throne of Ayutthaya to Boromrachathirat and returned to his old base, Lop Buri. But when it appeared that the agreement was breached and Boromrachathirat was instead succeeded by his son, Thong Lan, Ramesuan then seized the throne and killed Thong Lan.

Modern scholars believe otherwise. Suchit Wongthet (Thai: สุจิตต์ วงษ์เทศ) expressed the opinion that Boromrachathirat's arrival in Ayutthaya with troops was apparently to "seize power by means of military force (called coup in our days)" and Ramesuan returned to Lop Buri just to accumulate more power and wait for an opportunity to strike back. Pramin Khrueathong (Thai: ปรามินทร์ เครือทอง) also believed that Boromrachathirat used military strength to force Ramesuan out of the throne, saying this was probably why Ramesuan took revenge on Boromrachathirat's young son, Thong Lan, killing the child violently.

These events were part of a series of conflicts between the houses of Uthong and Suphannaphum that would continue until Suphannaphum achieved decisive victory over Uthong at the end of Ramrachathirat's reign, allowing Suphannaphum to remain in power over the Kingdom of Ayutthaya for almost the next two centuries.

== Bibliography ==
- Čhansuwan, ‘Ēkkarāt (2011). Samretthōt nư̄a rātchabanlang สำเร็จโทษเหนือราชบัลลังก์ [Deaths Over the Throne] (in Thai). Bangkok: Yipsī. ISBN 9786167071329.
- Kasētsiri, Chānwit (2005). Phetlœ̄t‘anan, Thamrongsak (ed.). 'Ayutthayā prawattisāt læ kānmư̄ang อยุธยา ประวัติศาสตร์และการเมือง [Ayutthaya: History and Politics] (in Thai) (4th ed.). Bangkok: Foundation for Promotion of Social Sciences and Humanities Textbooks Project. ISBN 9749157273.
- Khrư̄athǭng, Prāmin (2011-05-02). "Krung sī patiwat pritsanā ratthaprahān ngīap khǭng khunlūang phǭ ngūa yǭm rư̄ yưt sǭng" กรุงศรีปฏิวัติ ปริศนารัฐประหารเงียบของขุนหลวงพ่องั่ว 'ยอม' หรือ 'ยึด' (2) [Ayutthayan Revolutions: Mysteries About Silent Coup of Khunluang Pho Ngua – 'Giving Willingly' or 'Forced to Give' (2)]. Matichon.co.th (in Thai). Bangkok: Matichon.
- Phrarātchaphongsāwadān chabap phrarātchahatthalēkhā lem nưng พระราชพงศาวดาร ฉบับพระราชหัตถเลขา เล่ม ๑ [Royal Autograph Chronicle, Volume 1] (in Thai) (8th ed.). Bangkok: Fine Arts Department of Thailand. 1991. ISBN 9744171448.
- Phrarātchaphongsāwadān krung sayām chabap mǭ bratle พระราชพงศาวดารกรุงสยาม ฉบับหมอบรัดเล [Doctor Bradley Royal Chronicle of Siam] (in Thai) (2nd ed.). Bangkok: Khōsit. 2006. ISBN 9749489993.
- Phrarātchaphongsāwadān krung sī 'ayutthayā chabap phan čhannumāt (čhœ̄m) læ 'ēkkasān 'ư̄n พระราชพงศาวดารกรุงศรีอยุธยา ฉบับพันจันทนุมาศ (เจิม) และเอกสารอื่น [Phan Channumat (Choem)'s Royal Chronicle of Ayutthaya, and Other Documents] (in Thai). Nonthaburī: Sī Panyā. 2010. ISBN 9786167146089.
- Prachum phongsāwadān chabap kānčhanāphisēk lem nưng ประชุมพงศาวดาร ฉบับกาญจนาภิเษก เล่ม ๑ [Golden Jubilee Collection of Historical Archives, Volume 1] (in Thai). Bangkok: Fine Arts Department of Thailand. 1999. ISBN 9744192151.
- Prachum phongsāwadān phāk thī pǣtsip sǭng rư̄ang phrarātchaphongsāwadān krung sayām čhāk tonchabap khǭng britit miosīam krung london ประชุมพงศาวดาร ภาคที่ ๘๒ เรื่อง พระราชพงศาวดารกรุงสยามจากต้นฉบับของบริติชมิวเซียม กรุงลอนดอน [Collection of Historical Archives, Volume 82: A Royal Chronicle of the Kingdom of Siam from the Original Manuscripts of the British Museum, London] (in Thai) (2nd ed.). Bangkok: Fine Arts Department of Thailand. 1994. ISBN 9744190256.
- Princess Maha Chakri Sirindhorn Foundation (2011). Nāmānukrom phramahākasat thai นามานุกรมพระมหากษัตริย์ไทย [Directory of Thai Kings] (in Thai). Bangkok: Princess Maha Chakri Sirindhorn Foundation. ISBN 9786167308258.
- Somdet Phra Phonnarat (Kǣo) (1932). Čhunlayutthakārawong Phūk Sǭng จุลยุทธการวงศ ผูก ๒ [Chronicle of Minor Wars, Second Bundle] (in Thai). Bangkok: Sōphon Phiphat Thanākǭn.
- Somdet Phra Phonnarat (Kǣo) (2015). Phakdīkham, Sānti (ed.). Phrarātchaphongsāwadān chabap somdet phra phonnarat wat phra chēttuphon trūatsǭp chamra čhāk 'ēkkasān tūakhīan พระราชพงศาวดาร ฉบับสมเด็จพระพนรัตน์วัดพระเชตุพน ตรวจสอบชำระจากเอกสารตัวเขียน [Royal Chronicle: Version by His Holiness Phonnarat of Wat Phra Chettuphon, Checked Against Manuscripts] (in Thai). Bangkok: Rama I Scholarship Foundation Under His Majesty's Patronage. ISBN 9786169235101.
- Van Vliet, Jeremias (2003). Wongthēt, Sučhit (ed.). Phongsāwadā krung sī 'ayutthayā chabap wan walit phutthasakkarāt song phan nưng rǭi pǣtsip sǭng พงศาวดารกรุงศรีอยุธยา ฉบับวันวลิต พ.ศ. ๒๑๘๒ [Van Vliet Chronicle of Ayutthaya, 2182 BE (1640 CE)] (in Thai). Translated by Wanāsī Sāmanasēn (2nd ed.). Bangkok: Matichon. ISBN 9743229221.
- Wongthēt, Sučhit (2013-12-24). "Khunlūang pha ngūa mư̄ang suphan yưt 'amnāt ratthaprahān 'ayutthayā" ขุนหลวงพะงั่วเมืองสุพรรณยึดอำนาจรัฐประหารอยุธยา [Khunluang Pha Ngua from Suphan Seized Power in Ayutthaya]. Sujitwongthes.com (in Thai). Bangkok: Matichon.
- Wongthēt, Sučhit (2014-01-31). "Rāmēsūan mư̄ang lawō lāng rātchawong suphannaphūm" ราเมศวรเมืองละโว้ล้างราชวงศ์สุพรรณภูมิ [Ramesuan from Lavo Overthrew Suphannaphum Dynasty]. Sujitwongthes.com (in Thai). Bangkok: Matichon.

Thong Lan House of Suphannaphum Born: c. 35 LE (1373/74 CE) Died: 750 LE (1388/89 CE)
Regnal titles
Preceded by Borommarachathirat I	King of Ayutthaya; Seven days in 750 LE (1388/89 CE)	Succeeded by Ramesuan
