= Ramesuan (king of Ayutthaya) =

King of Ayutthaya (1369–1370, 1388–1395)

Ramesuan ราเมศวร
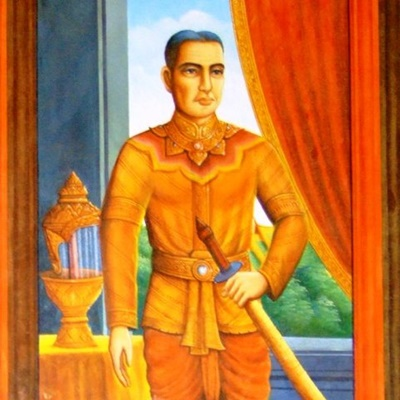
- Modern depiction of Ramesuan

King of Ayutthaya
- 1st reign: 1369–1370
- Predecessor: Uthong
- Successor: Borommarachathirat I
- 2nd reign: 1388–1395
- Predecessor: Thong Lan
- Successor: Ramracha
- Born: 1339
- Died: 1395 (aged 55–56)
- Issue: Ramaracha
Names
- Somdet Phra Ramesuan
- Dynasty: Uthong
- Father: Ramathibodi I
- Mother: Sister of Borommarachathirat I

King Ramesuan (Thai: สมเด็จพระราเมศวร, romanized: RTGS: Somdet Phra Ramesuan, pronounced [sǒm.dèt pʰráʔ rāː.mēː.sǔa̯n]; 1339–1395), son of king Ramathibodi I, reigned as the second and fifth king of the kingdom of Ayutthaya. When King Ramathibodi ascended to the throne of Ayuthaya, he sent King Ramesuan to reign in Lavo. Upon King Ramathibodi's death in 1369, King Ramesuan traveled to Ayutthaya to assume the throne, but held it for less than a year before being deposed by his uncle, King Borommaracha I, the ruler of Suphanburi. Sources differ over the nature of their conflict; official chronicles state that the older Boromaracha ruled with the willing consent of his nephew, while Jeremias van Vliet's Short History of Thailand indicated that Boromaracha's ascension came only after a bloody conflict bordering on civil war.

Whatever the case, by 1388 King Ramesuan had gathered sufficient support from his power base in Lavo to return to Ayutthaya and challenge Boromarachi's 17-year-old son Thong Lan for the throne. King Ramesuan's forces quickly took the palace and executed Thong Lan. King Ramesuan then held the throne until 1395, when he was succeeded by his son Rama (also known as Ramaracha).

During King Ramesuan's second reign, the king seems to have come to an understanding with the kingdom of Sukhothai, against whom Boromaracha had warred throughout his reign. Instead, some sources record conflicts with the kingdom of Lan Na (in northern Thailand), and the empire of Angkor. Ayutthaya chronicles indicate that King Ramesuan took Chiang Mai, then the capital of the kingdom of Lan Na, in 1390 and settled many captives within the kingdom of Ayutthaya.

Ayutthaya during Ramesuan's reign

A similar defeat of Angkor is recorded as having taken place in 1393, in response to raids from the Cambodian kingdom. He placed his son on the throne but he was soon assassinated. Neither of these battles are attested to by chronicles from Lan Na or Angkor.

Ramesuan (king of Ayutthaya) House of Uthong Born: 1339 Died: 1395
Regnal titles
Preceded by Uthong	King of Ayutthaya; First Reign; 1369–1370	Succeeded by Borommarachathirat I
Preceded by Thong Lan	King of Ayutthaya; Second Reign; 1388–1395	Succeeded by Ramrachathirat
