= Wat Phutthaisawan =

Buddhist temple in Thailand

Coordinates: 14°20′21.84″N 100°33′34.92″E

- วัดพุทไธศวรรย์
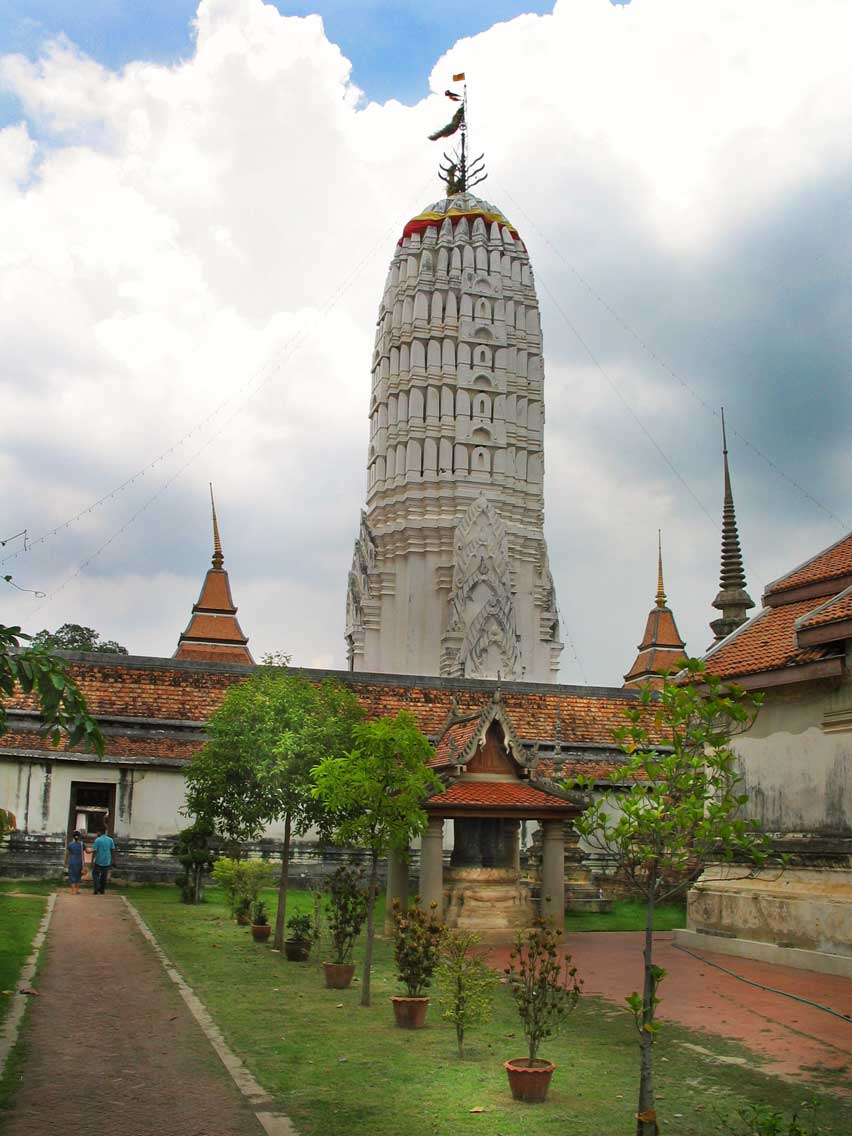
- The main prang of temple

- Location within Thailand

Religion
- Affiliation: Buddhism
- Sect: Theravāda
- Region: central Thailand

Location
- Location: Samphao Lom, Phra Nakhon Si Ayutthaya, Phra Nakhon Si Ayutthaya, Thailand
- Country: Thailand

Architecture
- Founder: King Uthong (Ramathibodi I)
- Completed: 1353

Website
- www.putthaijatukam.com

Wat Phutthaisawan (Thai: วัดพุทไธศวรรย์; also spelled: Phutthai Sawan or Buddhaisawan; literally: "Monastery of Buddhist Kingship") is a historic Thai Buddhist temple in Phra Nakhon Si Ayutthaya Province, central Thailand, and is part of Ayutthaya Historical Park. It is over 666 years old.

The temple is situated on the west bank of Chao Phraya River, opposite to south of Ayutthaya City. The temple was built in 1353 by King Uthong (Ramathibodi I), who was the first monarch and founder of Ayutthaya Kingdom at the royal residence of "Wiang Lek" or "Wiang Hlek" from inconsistent writing, the site where he first settled before establishing Ayutthaya as the capital city in 1350. He built this temple to serve as a royal monastery after he had reigned for three years.

The most striking aspect of this temple is a white prang (Khmer-style pagoda), located in the middle of the ancient compound and built on an indented pedestal protruding towards the north and south. According to the cosmology of Buddhism, the prang represents the cosmic Mount Meru. The main prang is surrounded by a square cloister. The cloister is enclosed by an outer wall, which along with the pillars inside supports the roof. The floor of the terrace is one step higher than the court. The inner wall of the cloister houses rows of golden glittering Sukhothai Buddha images on decorated bases.

In the south area of the temple is the location of Wihan Phutthaisawan (reclining Buddha sanctuary). The building is currently only walls. Inside enshrines a large reclining Buddha image. In addition, there are other interesting things, such as Phra Ubosot, Buddhaghosa Residence, Three Kings Monument, and the murals etc.

Wat Phutthaisawan was one of the temples that survived the destruction during the second fall of Ayutthaya in 1767, so the temple remains in its decent condition in present day. In this event, the temple and neighbouring St Joseph's Church was the site of the fortress of the converts to prevent the invasion of the Burmese army.

Moreover, Wat Phutthaisawan is also well known as a krabi-krabong (ancient Thai sword fighting) school since Ayutthaya period until the present day under the name "Phutthaisawan Sword School".

This temple is open for viewing every day without the entrance fee from 08:00 AM to 05:00 PM.

== Images ==
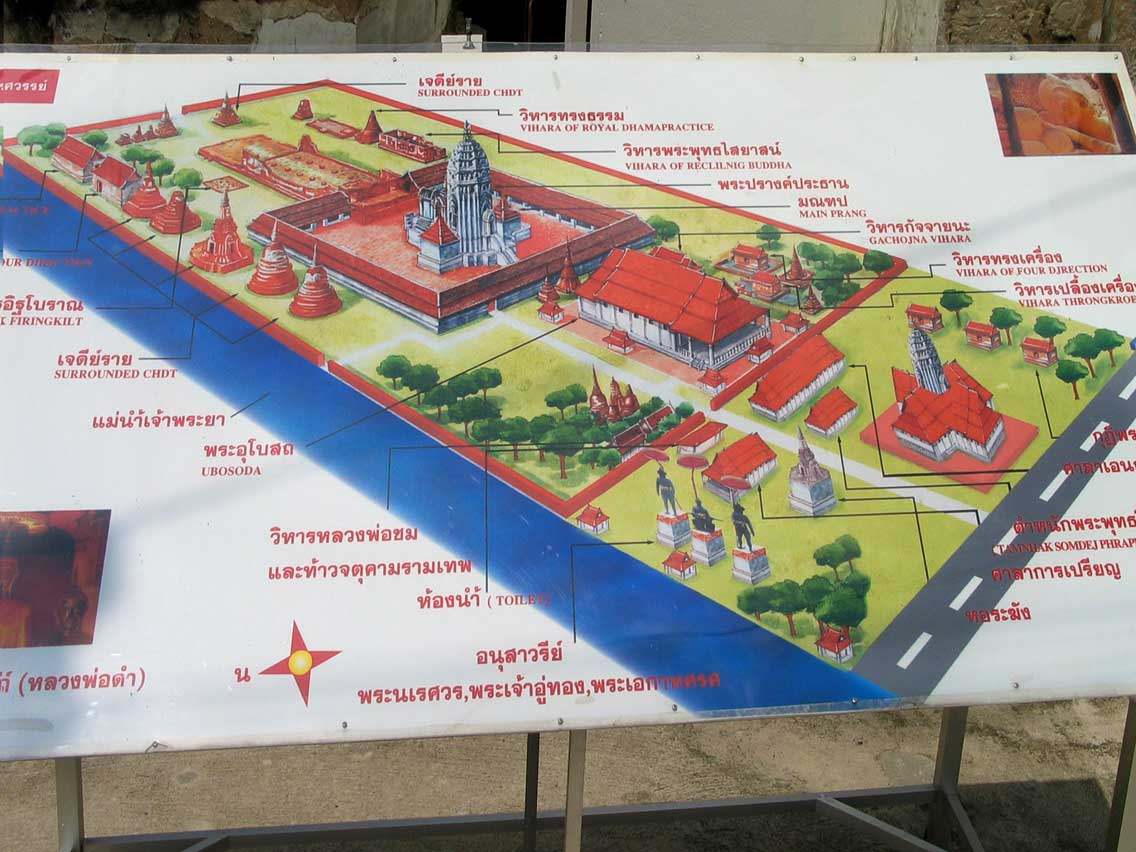
Temple map

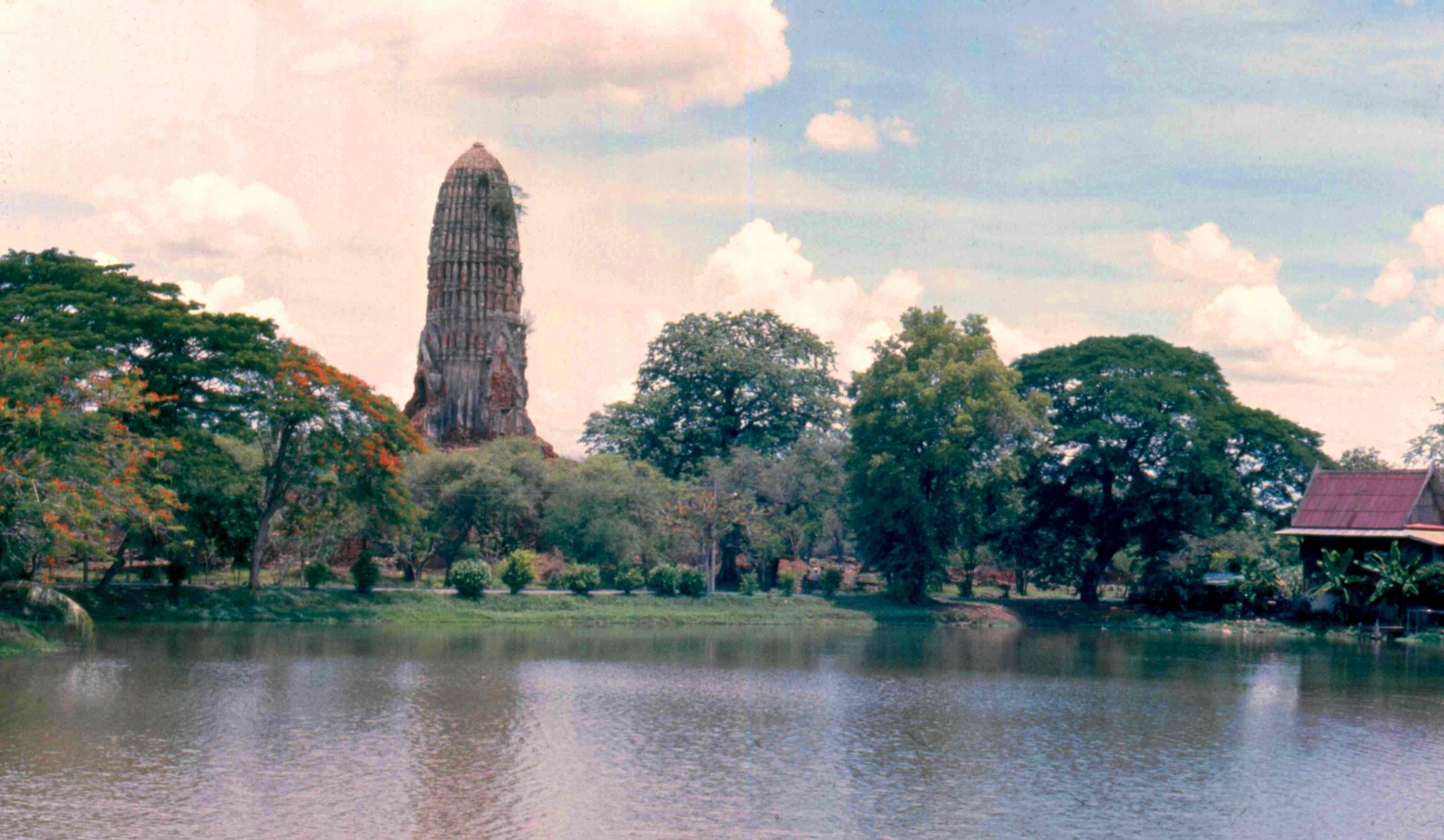
Wat Phutthaisawan in 1977

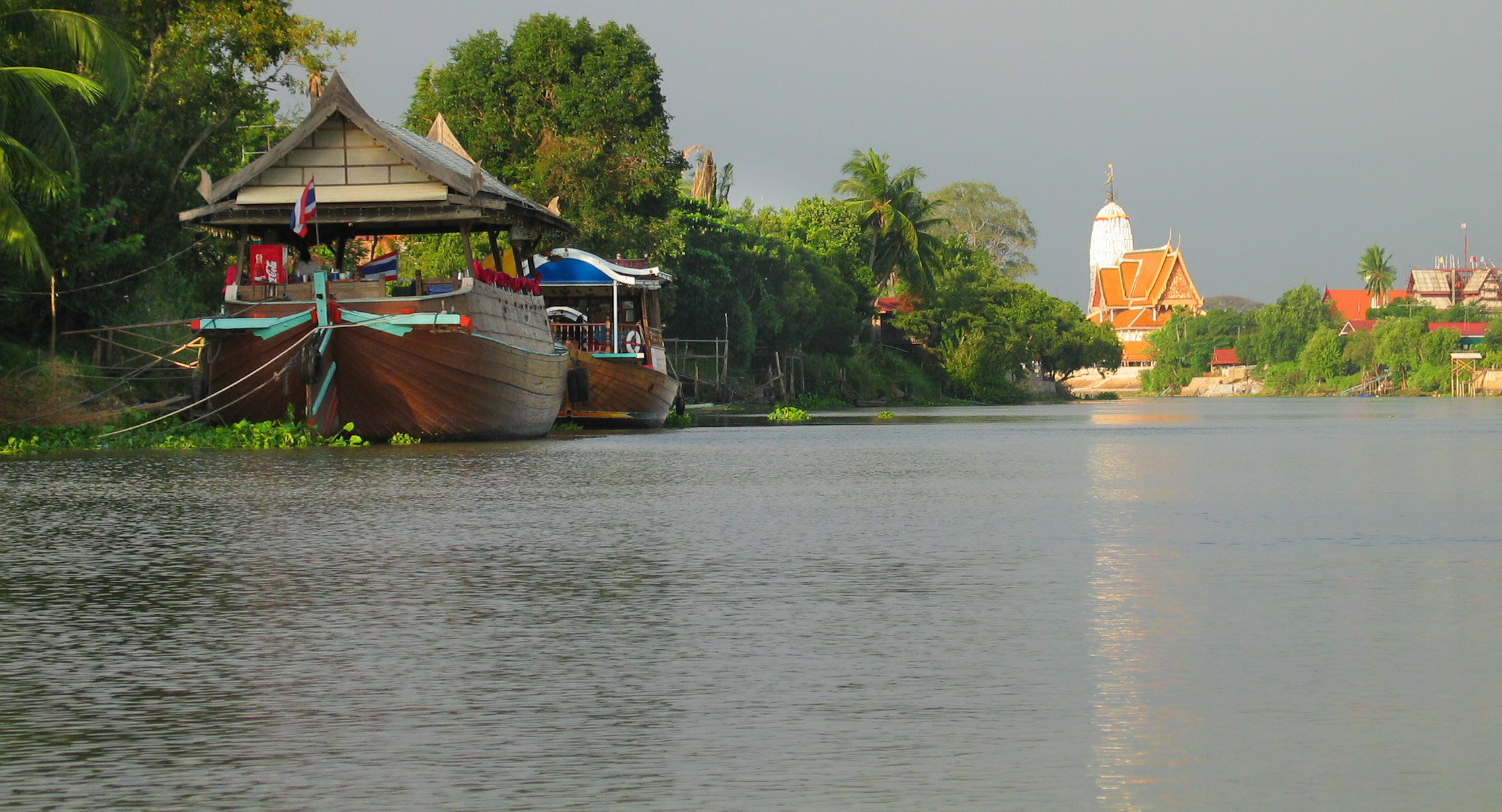
View of the temple from Chao Phraya River

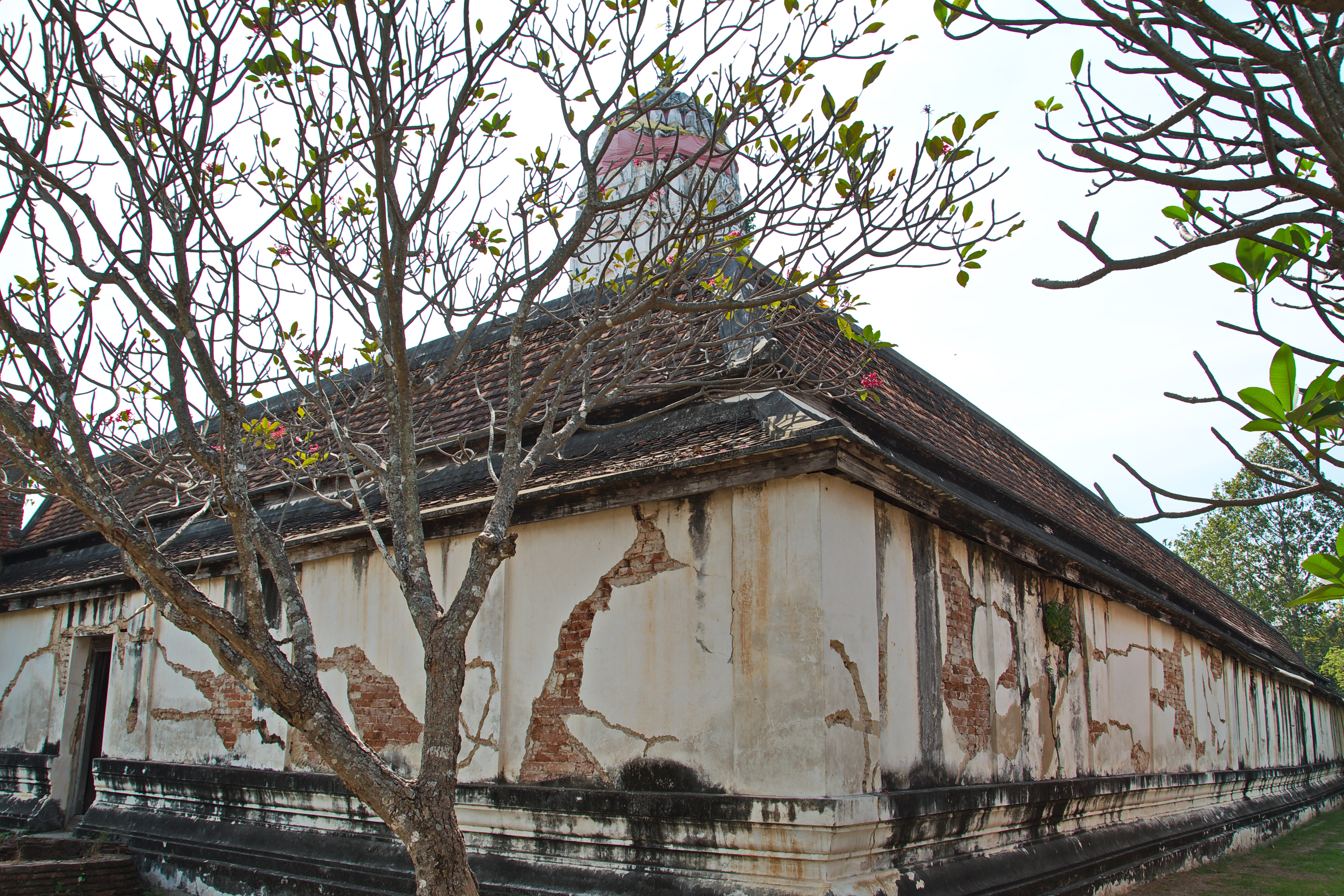
Walkway within the grounds of Wat Phutthaisawan

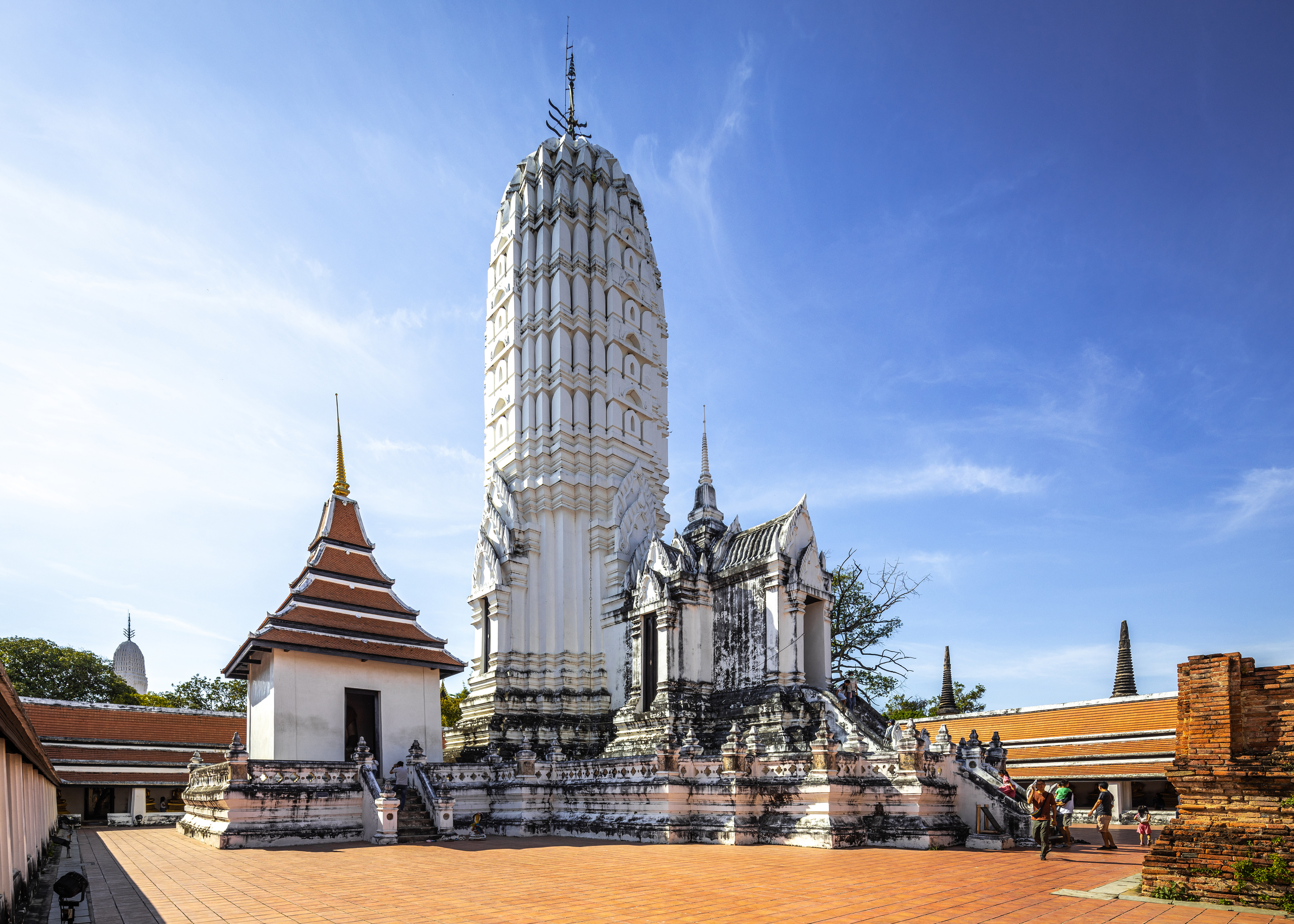
Main prang of Wat Phutthaisawan

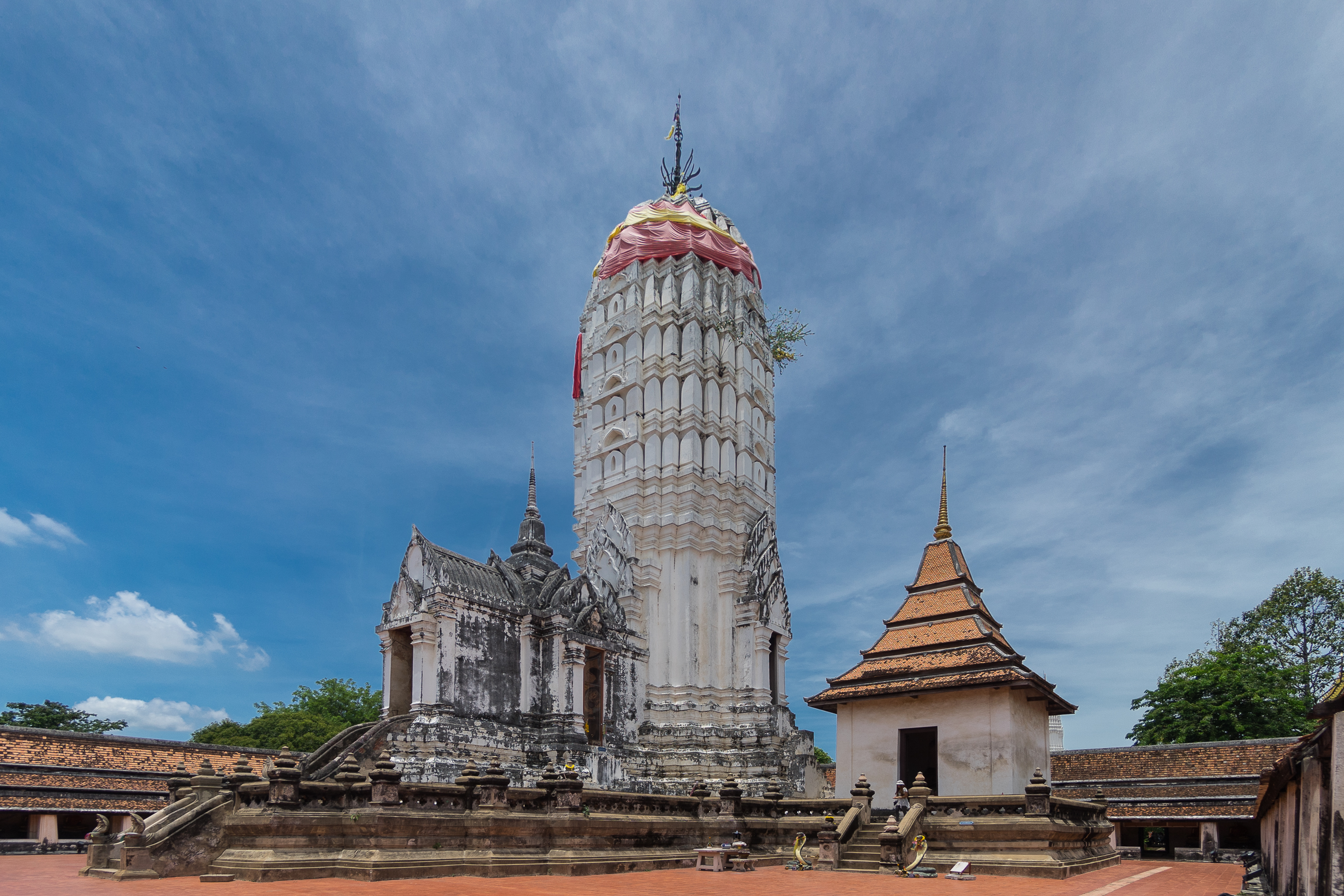
The main prang situated at the center of the cloister

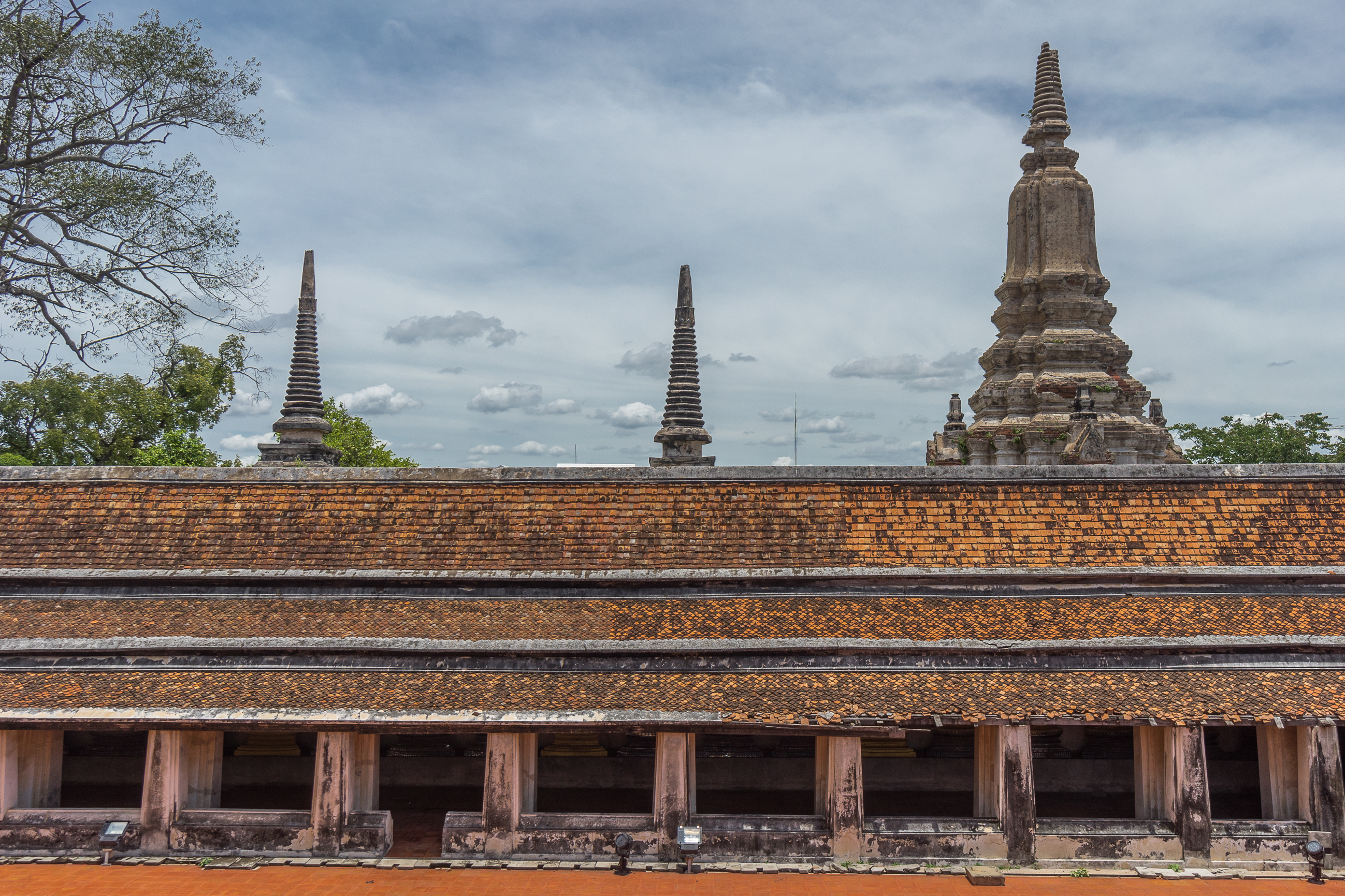
Cloister and outer chedis

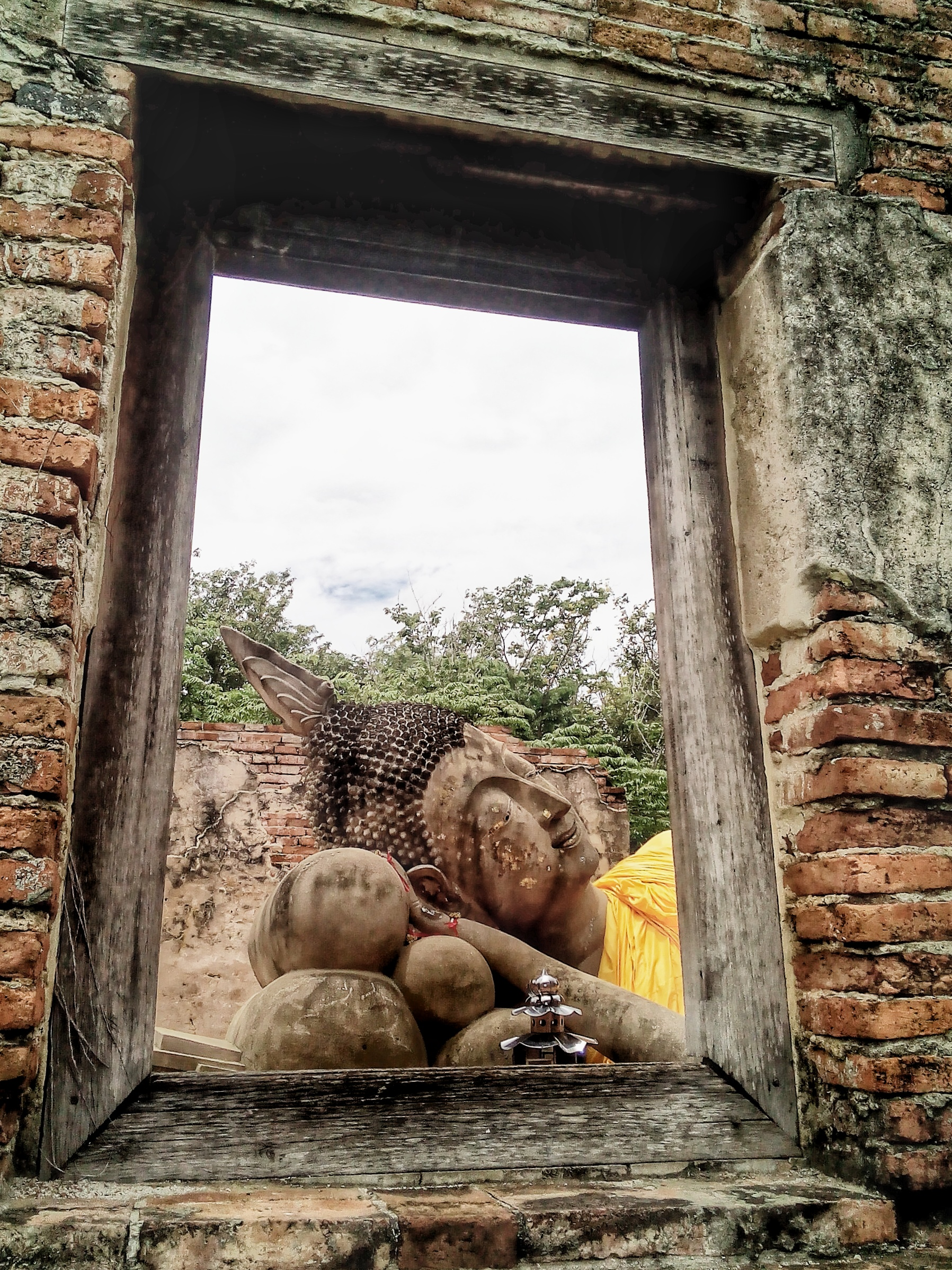
A big reclining Buddha image

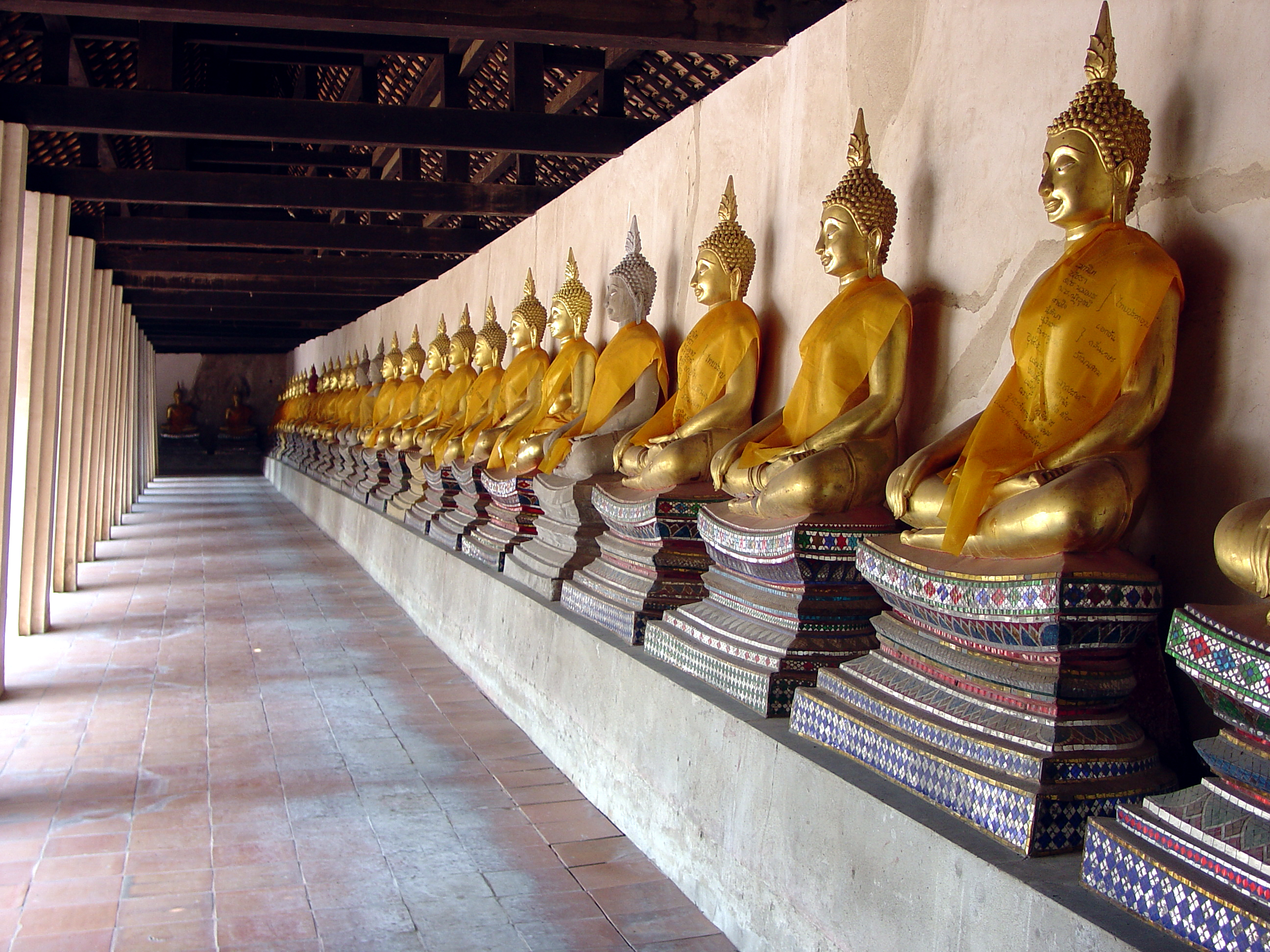
Row of Sukhothai Buddha images

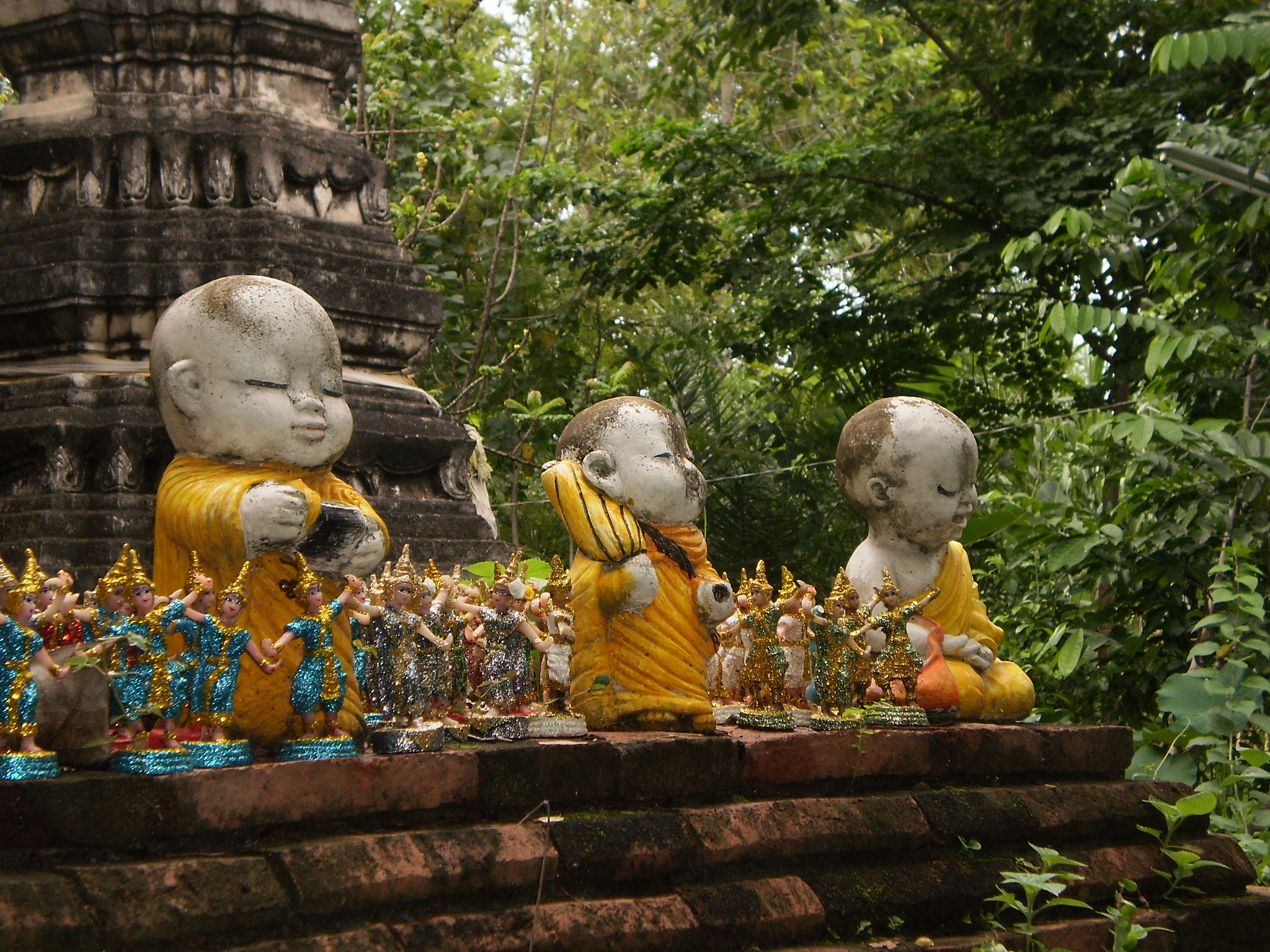
Small statues of Monks
