= Borommarachathirat I =

King of Ayutthaya from 1370 to 1388

Borommarachathirat I บรมราชาธิราชที่ 1
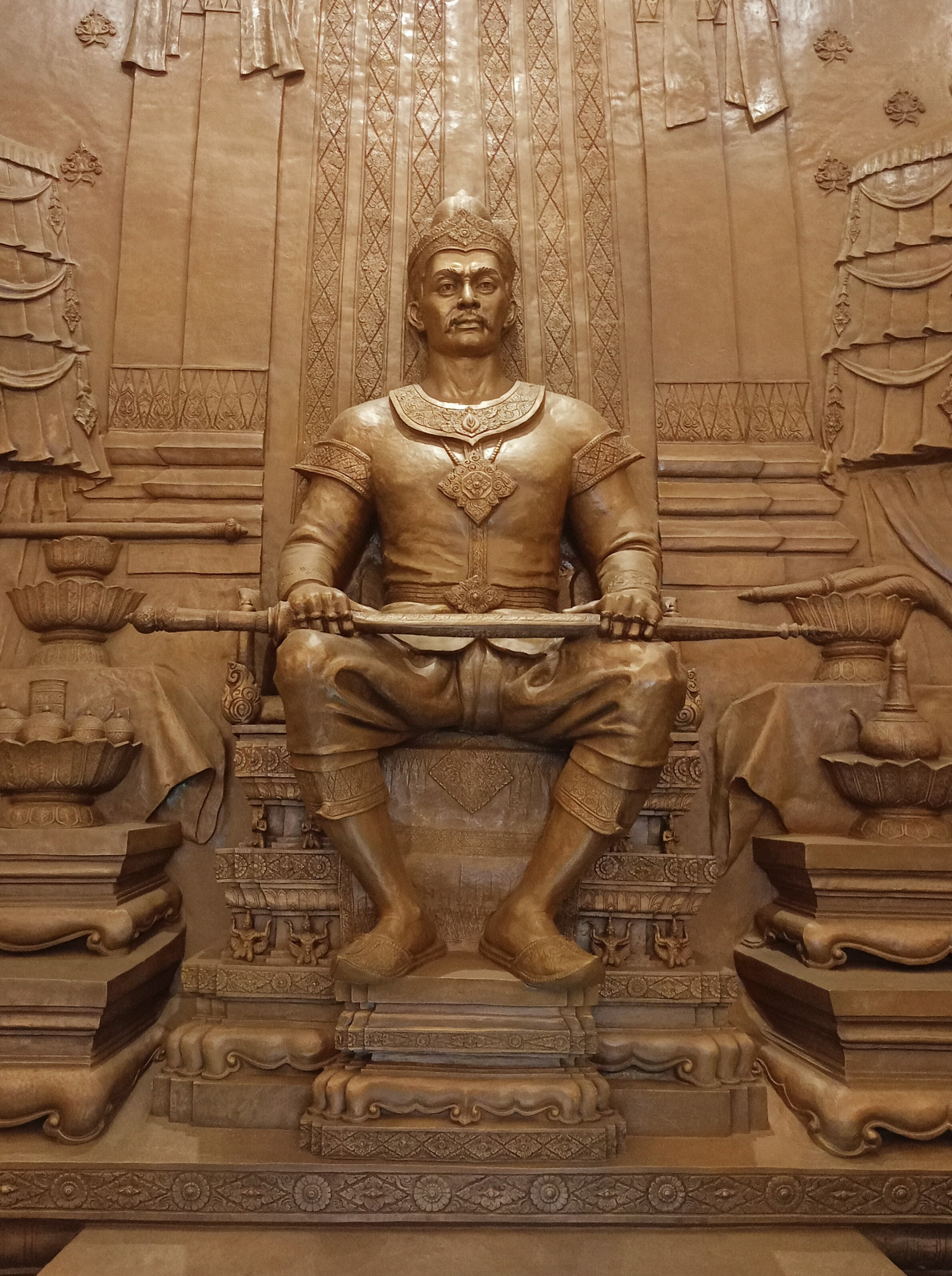
- Relief of King Borommarachathirat I at the Khunluang Pha Ngua and Suphan Buri History Sculpture Building, Suphan Buri Province, Thailand

King of Ayutthaya
- Reign: 1370–1388
- Predecessor: Ramesuan
- Successor: Thong Lan

Ruler of Suphan Buri
- Reign: 1351–1373
- Predecessor: Uthong?
- Successor: Intharacha?
- Born: c. 1310
- Died: 1388 (aged c. 78)
- Consort: sister of Maha Thammaracha I
- Issue: Thong Lan
- Dynasty: Suphannaphum

King Borommarachathirat I (Thai: สมเด็จพระบรมราชาธิราชที่ ๑, romanized: RTGS: Somdet Phra Borommarachathirat Thi Nueng), also known as Khunluang Pha Ngua (Thai: ขุนหลวงพะงั่ว; "King Pha Ngua"; r. 1370–1388), was the third king of the Ayutthaya Kingdom. He was the older brother of King Ramathibodi I's consort and the uncle of King Ramesuan. Prior to becoming king of Ayutthaya, Borommarachathirat I was the king of Suphannaphum (vassal to Ayutthaya). He was the brother-in-law of King Ramathibodi I, and the maternal uncle of King Ramesuan. Less than a year after King Uthong's death, he forced King Ramesuan from power and seized the throne. After his death in 1388, his son Thong Lan reigned for only a week before Ramesuan, who had retreated to Lavo, returned and overthrew him. Ramesuan later reclaimed the throne for a second reign.

== Biography ==
It is hypothesized that Borommarachathirat I was the fifth son of his family, as the name "Ngua" (Thai: งั่ว) traditionally refers to the fifth-born child in archaic Thai numbering. He was also the elder brother of the consort of Ramathibodi I. Consequently, King Ramathibodi I formally addressed him as an elder brother.

When Ramathibodi I established the Ayutthaya Kingdom in 1350, he appointed Khun Luang Pha Ngua as "Somdet Phra Borommarachathirat" and sent him to rule the city of Suphan Buri. Following the death of Ramathibodi I, his son, Ramesuan, traveled from Lopburi to ascend the throne in Ayutthaya, while Borommarachathirat I continued his governance over Suphan Buri.

== Accession ==
Following the death of Ramathibodi I in 1369, his son, Ramesuan, who was then the ruler of Lopburi, ascended the throne as the second monarch of the Ayutthaya Kingdom. In 1370, Borommarachathirat I, then the ruler of Suphan Buri, marched his army to Ayutthaya. Upon learning of his arrival, Ramesuan came out to welcome his maternal uncle into the capital. Ramesuan subsequently abdicated the throne in favor of Borommarachathirat I and returned to govern Lopburi as before.

Historians analyze this transition of power as a significant shift in the political balance between the Lopburi faction (the Uthong Dynasty) and the Suphan Buri faction (the Suphannaphum Dynasty). While traditional chronicles describe a peaceful abdication, the arrival of Borommarachathirat I with a military force is widely interpreted as a decisive factor that pressured Ramesuan to step down. This strategic move likely served to maintain the stability of the nascent kingdom and avoid a protracted internal conflict. The ascension of Borommarachathirat I marked the beginning of the Suphanphum Dynasty's dominance over Ayutthaya, which lasted for several decades.

== Royal campaigns and duties ==
Throughout his reign, he was a capable military commander, his reign marked Ayutthaya's expansion to the north. His reign marked Ayutthaya's expansion to the north. He suppressed a rebellion in the Sukhothai Kingdom (1371–78) and subjugated major northern centres such as Phitsanulok. When he invaded Chiang Mai, his forces were defeated and repulsed at the Battle of Sen Sanuk, near Chiang Mai. His significant campaigns include the following:

=== Khmer campaign ===
In 1353, while still the ruler of Suphan Buri, he marched his army army to Angkor Thom in the Khmer Empire to support Ramesuan's prior invasion. This conflict was sparked by the defection of the Khmer king. Consequently, King Ramathibodi I ordered Ramesuan to suppress the rebellion. However, the Khmer forces managed to rout the Ayutthayan vanguard and subsequently engaged the main army. Ramathibodi I then sent royal emissaries to summon Borommarachathirat I, who was residing in Suphan Buri, to assist Ramesuan. The campaign lasted for approximately one year, culminating in Ayutthaya's victory and the forced relocation of a large number of Khmer captives to Ayutthaya.

Following his ascension to the Ayutthayan throne, Borommarachathirat I initiated campaigns against several northern city-states in 1374, including Chakangrao, Phitsanulok, Chiang Mai, and Lampang. These prolonged northern conflicts continued until the end of his reign.

=== Wars with Chakangrao ===
The King launched four distinct expeditions against Chakangrao (modern-day Kamphaeng Phet), a crucial frontier city of the Sukhothai Kingdom.

- First campaign (1376): Phraya Sai Kaeo and Phraya Khamhaeng, the rulers of Chakangrao, rode out to defend the city. The battle resulted in the death of Phraya Sai Kaeo, while Phraya Khamhaeng managed to retreat into the city walls. The Ayutthayan army subsequently withdrew.
- Second campaign (1378): Phraya Khamhaeng and Thao Pha Khong realized they could not withstand the royal army. Thao Pha Khong attempted to flee but was pursued and routed by Borommarachathirat I's forces, resulting in the capture of numerous nobles and commanders before the Ayutthayan army returned to the capital.
- Third campaign (1381): Maha Thammaracha II, the seventh monarch of Sukhothai, personally led the defense. Realizing he was outmatched by the Ayutthayan forces, he ultimately surrendered. Borommarachathirat I allowed Maha Thammaracha II to continue ruling Sukhothai as a vassal state of Ayutthaya before withdrawing his army to the capital.
- Fourth campaign (1388): The King marched on Chakangrao once more, though historical records do not specify the cause of this expedition.

=== Religious patronage ===
In 1375 , the King consulted with Phra Maha Thera Thammakanyan and commissioned the construction of Phra Si Rattana Mahathat in the eastern quarter of the city (present-day Wat Mahathat). The central reliquary tower (prang) measured 19 wa (approximately 38 meters) in height, with its finial (Nopphasun) reaching an additional 3 wa (approximately 6 meters).

Borommarachathirat I Suphannaphum dynasty Born: c.1310 Died: 1388
Regnal titles
Preceded by Ramesuan	King of Ayutthaya; 1370–1388	Succeeded by Thong Lan
Preceded by Uthong as King	Ruler of Suphannabhum; 1351–1373	Succeeded by Intharacha
