= Uthong =

King of Siam from 1351 to 1369

Ramathibodi I รามาธิบดีที่ ๑
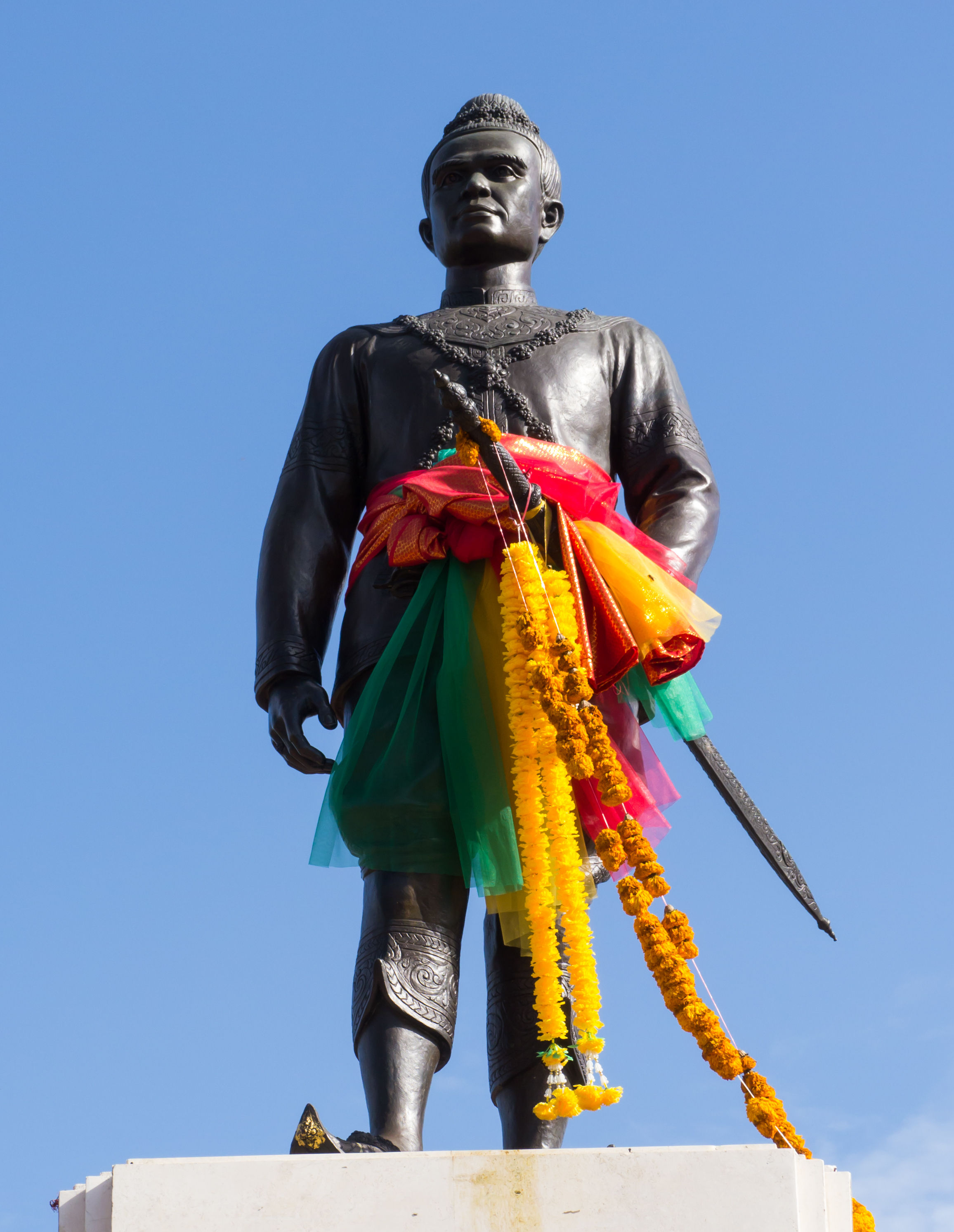
- Royal Statue of King Ramathibodi I in Ayutthaya, Ayutthaya province, Thailand

King of Ayutthaya
- Reign: 4 March 1351–1369
- Predecessor: Monarchy established
- Successor: Ramesuan

King of Xiān's Ayodhya
- Reign: 1344–1351
- Predecessor: Baramaraja
- Successor: Refounded as Ayutthaya
- Born: 10 March 1314
- Died: 1369
- Issue: Ramesuan
Names
- Uthong; Ramathibodi I
- Dynasty: Uthong
- Father: Baramaraja
- Mother: Sunandhadevi

King U-thong (Thai: พระเจ้าอู่ทอง; pronounced [ʔùː.tʰɔ̄ːŋ]) or King Ramathibodi I (Thai: สมเด็จพระรามาธิบดีที่ ๑; Rāmādhipatī;, 1314–1369) was the founder and first monarch of the Ayutthaya Kingdom, reigning from 1351 to 1369. He is traditionally regarded as a pivotal figure in Thai history for unifying the rival power centers of Lopburi (Lavo) and Suphan Buri (Suphannaphum), establishing a centralized state that would dominate mainland Southeast Asia for over four centuries.

Ramathibodi I was the son of a mixed Siamese Mon–Chinese monarch Baramaraja, previously a prince of Si Satchanalai who subsequently ascended the throne of Xiān's Ayodhya, and Sunandhadevī, a younger princess of the court of Suvarnaraja, the ninth monarch of Xiān. Originally known by the title Varashreṣṭhakumāra (วรเชษฐกุมาร), he succeeded his father as king of Xiān in 1344. In 1351, he was formally enthroned as the founding monarch of the Ayutthaya Kingdom. His maternal lineage can be traced back to the Dvaravati period, specifically under the ruling dynasty of the polity situated in the Phraek Si Racha region. (Note: As says in the Ayutthaya Testimonies that Indraraja or Pra Poa Noome Thele Seri, the progenitor of Ramathibodi I, was the son of Anuraja, ruler of the polity in Phraek Si Racha.)

== Origins ==
He was known as Prince Uthong (meaning "Golden Cradle") before he ascended to the throne in 1350. There are many theories about Uthong's background, including possibly being a descendant of Mangrai. The designation “Uthong” was initially attributed to Ramathibodi I by Prince Damrong Rajanubhab, son of King Mongkut, who identified him with the figure of Uthong referenced in several chronicles. This identification was predicated upon the hypothesis that Ramathibodi I originated from Mueang Uthong. Subsequent scholarly inquiries, however, have demonstrated the inaccuracy of this assumption.

According to a better-known source, a seventeenth-century account by Dutchman Jeremias van Vliet, a Renowned Legend stated that Uthong was an ethnic Chinese, having sailed down from China. After succeeding in trade, he became influential enough to rule the city of Phetchaburi, (or Vajrapur in Sanskrit) a coastal town of the Gulf of Thailand, before travelling up to Ayutthaya. This monarch, which was previously believed to be Ramathibodi I, has now been identified with Uthong II, who was born to Pra Poa Noome Thele Seri, king of Phrip Phri, and Chandradevi (จันทรเทวีศรีบาทราชบุตรีศรีทองสมุทร), a Cham-Chinese princess.

== Reign ==
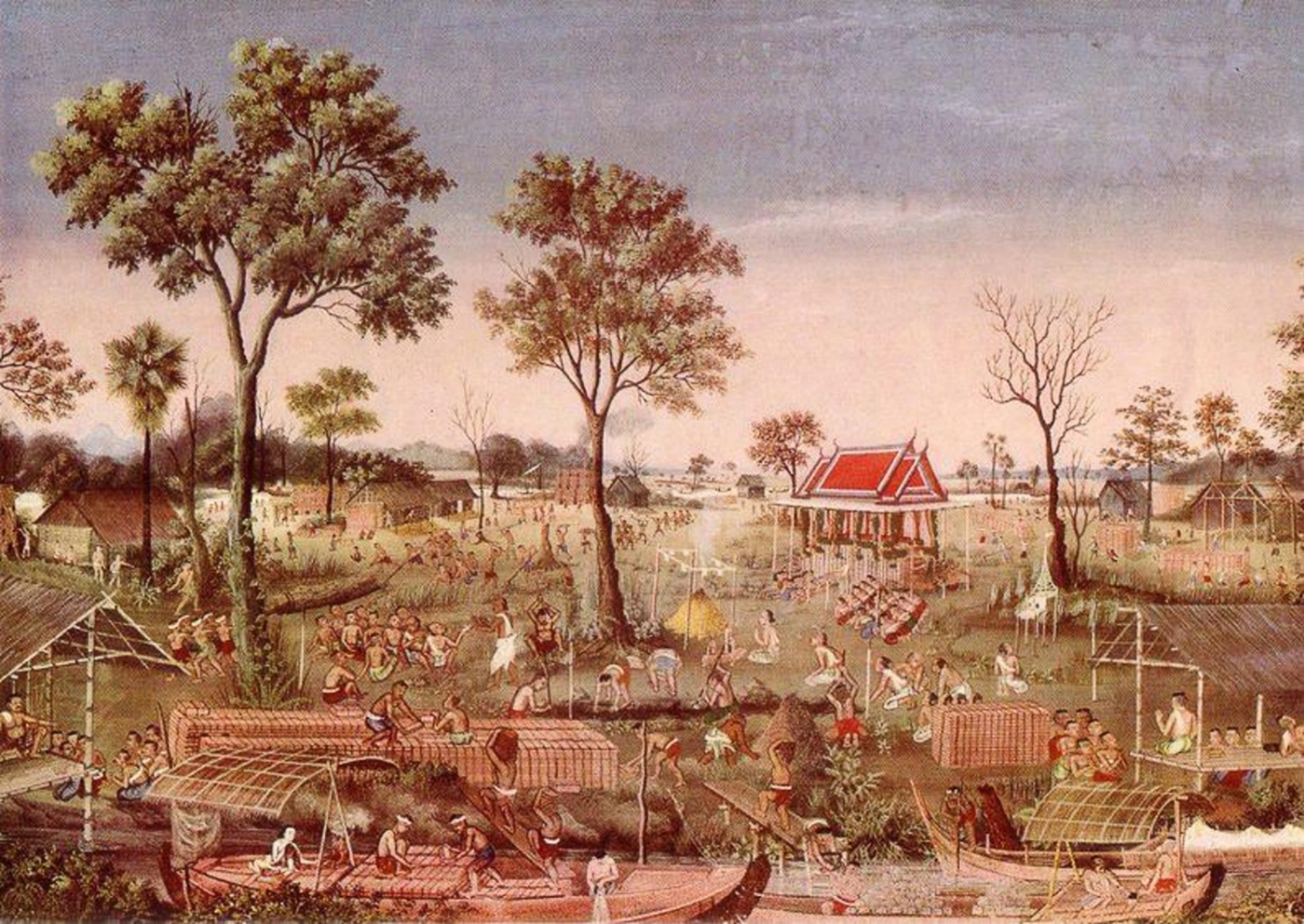
The founding of the Kingdom of Ayutthaya by King Ramatibodi I, painting made by Nai Im according to the royal decree of king Chulalongkorn in 1897.

Ramathibodi I ascended to the throne of Uthong circa 1347. In 1351, he relocated the capital approximately 80 kilometers (50 miles) east to an island in the Chao Phraya River, where he founded the city of Dvaravati Si Ayutthaya (ทวารวดีศรีอยุธยา), commonly known as Ayutthaya. The city subsequently served as the capital of the kingdom for over 400 years.

On 4 March 1351, Ramathibodi I was formally established as the sovereign of a centralized state in the Chao Phraya valley, supported by the power centers of Ayutthaya, Lop Buri, and Suphan Buri. Under his reign, the kingdom emerged as a significant regional power. His foreign policy involved maintaining diplomatic relations with the Sukhothai Kingdom to the north, while conducting military campaigns against the Khmer Empire to secure regional hegemony.

Ramathibodi promoted maritime trade with Persian and Chinese merchants, facilitating Ayutthaya's development into a major international entrepôt. According to royal chronicles, his authority extended to Korat, Chanthaburi, Tavoy, Tanintharyi, Tenasserim, and parts of Malaya.

Ramathibodi I established four Great Officers of State. These were the Ministry of the Interior (Wieng), the Ministry of the Treasury (Klang), the Ministry for the King's Household (Wang), and the Ministry of Agriculture (Na). He also codified the T'ai laws. Finally, he formed an alliance with the Ming dynasty.

In 1352 he laid siege to Yasodharapura (Angkor). He was successful the following year and placed one of his sons on the throne. However, they were only able to keep the throne until 1357, when the Khmers were able to regain it.

== Legacy ==
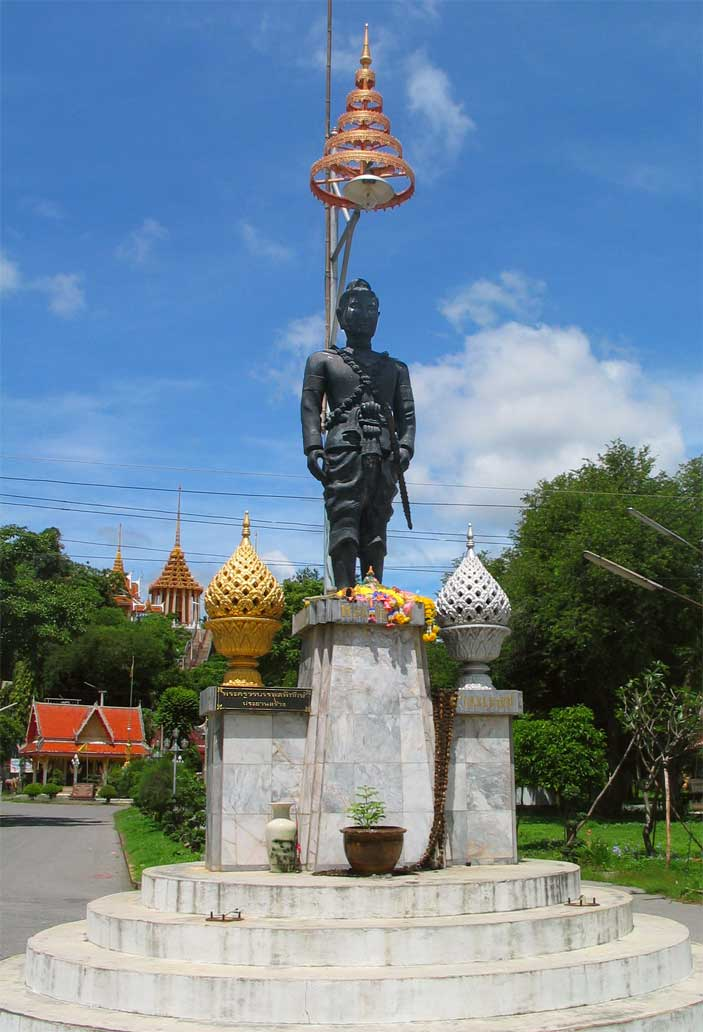
Statue of King Ramathibodi I, founder of Ayutthaya, in U Thong District, Suphan Buri Province.

=== Legal system ===
One of Ramathibodi I's most significant contributions was the establishment of the Siamese legal system, which served as the kingdom's judicial foundation until the comprehensive reforms of King Chulalongkorn (Rama V) in the late 19th century. Between 1350 and 1359, he is credited with codifying a set of laws derived from traditional Tai customs—historically associated with the Nanzhao Kingdom of southern China—and other practices preserved by the Tai peoples prior to their settlement in the Chao Phraya basin.

=== Religion ===
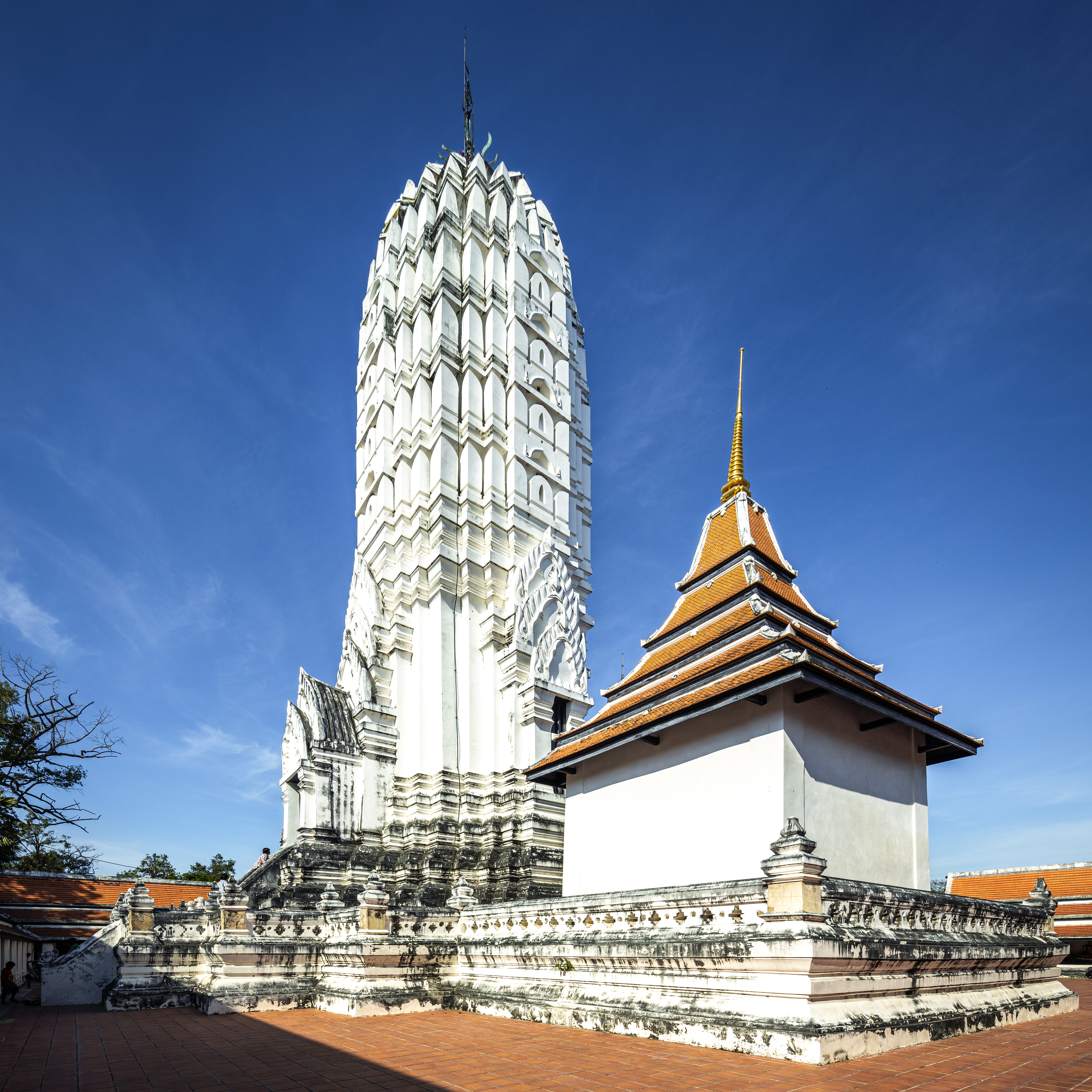
Wat Phutthaisawan, Phra Nakhon Si Ayutthaya Province, Thailand.

Ramathibodi I also patronized Buddhism and commissioned several temples, including Wat Phutthaisawan, Wat Pa Kaeo, and Wat Phra Ram.

=== Conflict of two dynasties ===
King Ramathibodi's death in 1369 sparked a prolonged succession conflict between two powerful clans. Initially, his son Ramesuan ascended the throne, but he later abdicated in favor of Ramathibodi's brother-in-law, Borommarachathirat I of the Suphannaphum dynasty.

The power struggle continued as Ramesuan reclaimed the throne in 1388 by deposing Borommarachathirat I's young son, Thong Lan. The Suphannaphum dynasty eventually secured long-term control in 1409, when Borommarachathirat I's nephew, Intharacha, took back Ayutthaya. Following this period, the Uthong dynasty declined in influence, eventually becoming a noble family within the Ayutthayan administrative structure until the 16th century.

== See also ==
- Lavo Kingdom
- Ayutthaya Kingdom
- History of Lopburi
- Phetburi
- Nakhon Thai

== Bibliography ==
- Wyatt, David K., Thailand: A Short History, New Haven (Yale University), 2003. ISBN 0-300-08475-7
- Srisak Vallipodom, Sheikh Ahmad Qomi and the History of Siam, Cultural Center of the Islamic City, Republic of Iran, Bangkok 1995, p. 209
- Plubplung Kongchana, The Persians in Ayutthaya, Institute of Asia Pacific Studies, Srinakharinwirot University.

Uthong (Ramathibodi I) House of Uthong Cadet branch of the House of Phetchaburi–Viang Chaiprakarn Born: 10 March 1314 Died: 1369
Regnal titles
New title	King of Ayutthaya; 1351–1369	Succeeded by Ramesuan
Preceded by Uthong IV	King of Suphannabhum; 1341–1351	Succeeded by Borommarachathirat I as Ruler
Preceded by Baramaraja	King of Ayodhya; 1344–1351	Refounded as Ayutthaya
