= History of Lopburi =

Location of Thailand

Known as "Lavo" during most of its history, Lopburi Province is one of the most important cities in the history of Thailand. The city has a long history, dating back into the prehistory period since the Bronze Age of more than 3,500 years ago.

Later, it was influenced by the art and culture of India in the 11th century when it entered the historical era. This first period under the influence of Indian culture was called the Dvaravati Period. Since that time, Lavo has been ruled by the Khmer, coming under the influence of their art and culture, in the 15th century, a time commonly called the Lopburi Period in Thai art history.

Eventually, when the Ayutthaya empire was established, Lavo decreased in importance until the reign of King Narai. He had a palace built in Lavo, and each year spent most of his time there. After the time of King Narai, Lavo had been abandoned, until the 19th centuries, King Mongkut (Rama IV) had it restored to be used as an inland royal city.

Later, in the 20th century, Prime Minister Marshal P. Piboolsongkhram developed Lopburi as a national military center.

== Location ==
Lavo is in central Thailand on a river which descends from the mountains "Sam-Yod" (Khao Sam Yod) above the city, and runs into the Lopburi River west of the city. This river runs into Chao Phraya River in Singburi Province.

== Prehistorical era ==
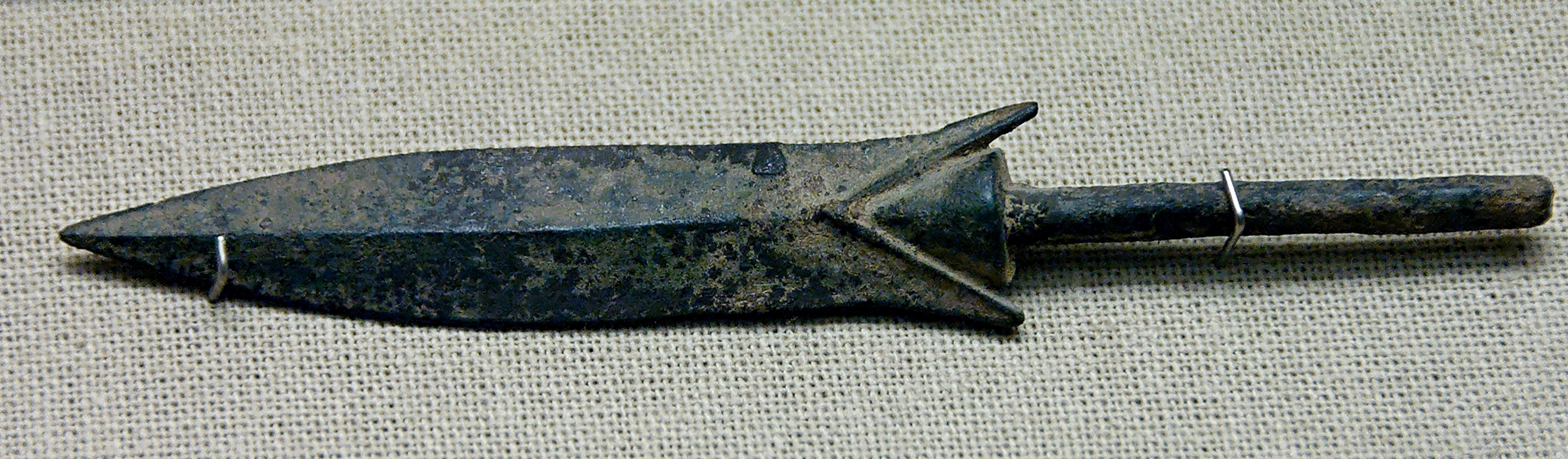
Arrow-head. Bronze, 4th century BCE.

This city is in the Chao Phraya River basin where historical, archaeological, and cultural evidence has been discovered that prehistoric humans lived here about 3,500 – 4,000 years ago or in the Bronze Age. Abandoned ancient cities with many pre-historic instruments and human skeletons has been found in several parts of the modern-day province.

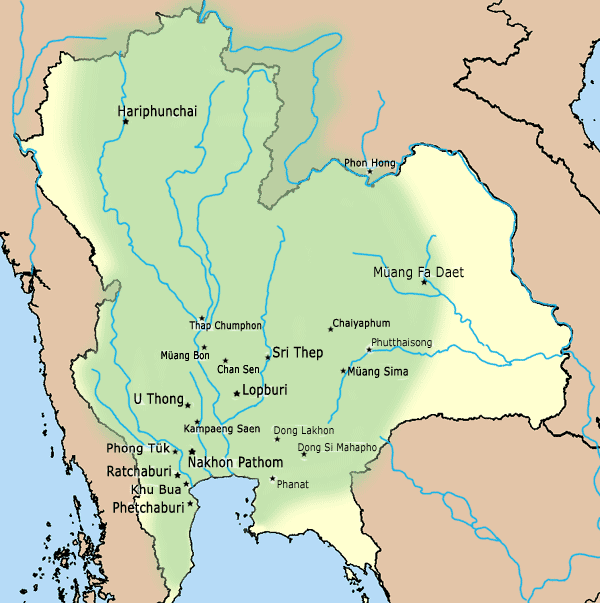
Territory of Dvaravati

According to the Northern Chronicles, Lavo (Lopburi) was founded by King Kalavarnadishraj, who came from Takkasila in 648 CE. According to Thai records, King Kakabatr from Takkasila (it is assumed that the city was Tak or Nakhon Chai Si) set the new era, Chula Sakarat in 638 CE. His son, King Kalavarnadishraj founded the city a decade later. And several years later he assigned Jamadevi to reign on the throne of the Haribhunjaya kingdom in the northern Thailand.

These kingdoms adopted Indian culture together with Theravada Buddhism and grew up under post-Indian (the local technology that adapt from Indian) and Mon influence in the 11th to 12th centuries, as it entered into the historical era. This first period under the influence of Indian culture was called the Dvaravati period. For the time being this kingdom was known as Saruka Lavo (Mon language). Although the inscription stones found in this area are the Mon language, there is not clear evidence to prove if the population of Lavo were actually of Mon ethnicity.

In 2018-2019 The Italian-Thai "Lopburi Regional Archaeological Project", co-directed by Dr Roberto Ciarla (ISMEO - International Association of Mediterranean and Oriental Studies) and Dr Pakpadee Yukongdee (Thai Fine Arts Department, Bangkok), discovered several hundreds of stone and shell adzes, remains of shell industry waste, terracotta artifacts, clay pots of different style, animal and human remains dating back to the Neolithic Period as well as to the Iron Age in the Lop Buri River basin at Khok Phutsa few kilometers north of the Lop Buri City. C14 dates, DNA analysis and full study of the artifacts are still in progress.

== Lavo in Chinese records ==
A portrait of Xuanzang

In the 6th century, Lavo sent tribute to the Chinese emperor during the Tang dynasty (618–907), and another during the Song dynasty (960–1279). The Tang Chronicles refer to Lavo and Dvaravati as Tou-ho-lo. The diary of the monk Xuanzang, dating from the same period (629–645), also mentions the region, referring to it as Tou-lo-po-ti.

Lavo sent tributes to Song dynasty twice, in 1115 and 1155. The Song Chronicles mention Lavo at that time as Lo Hu.

Marco Polo's writings also refer to Lavo, as Locak. It was described as being in the hinterland of the Chao Phraya basin, a place too far to be subject to attack by the Kublai Khan's army of Yuan (1271–1368).

== Khmer era ==
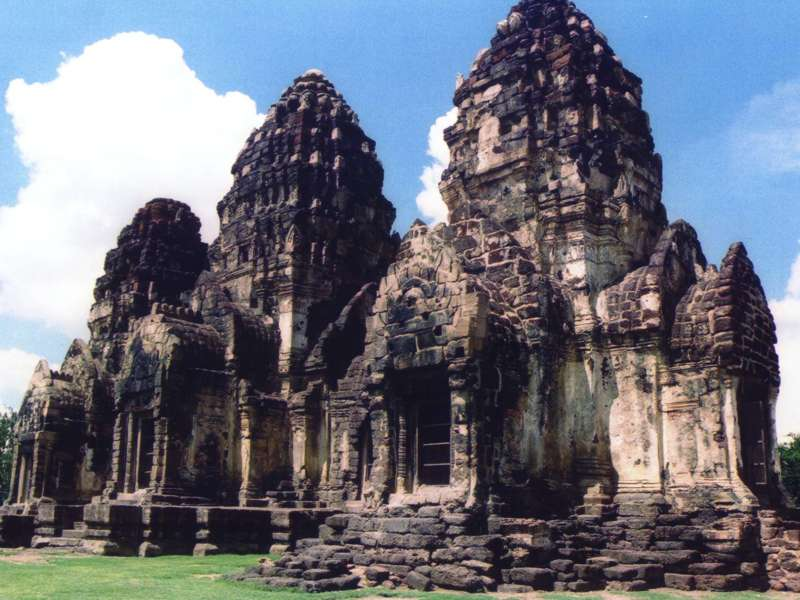
Prang Sam Yot, the Khmer temple in Lopburi

In the 10th century, when it was known as Lavodayapura (Khmer language), Lavo was subordinate to the Khmer empire came with the influence of their art and culture, in the 10th to 16th centuries. New construction used the stones of ruined Dvaravati holy places that were built originally without mortar. Thus, the oldest ruins that can now be found in Lopburi are always Khmer-style on a Dvaravati foundation.

The Khmers were present since the tenth century, but Lavo "became detached from Cambodia" at the end of the thirteenth century, sending embassies to China from 1289 to 1299.

== Ayutthaya era ==
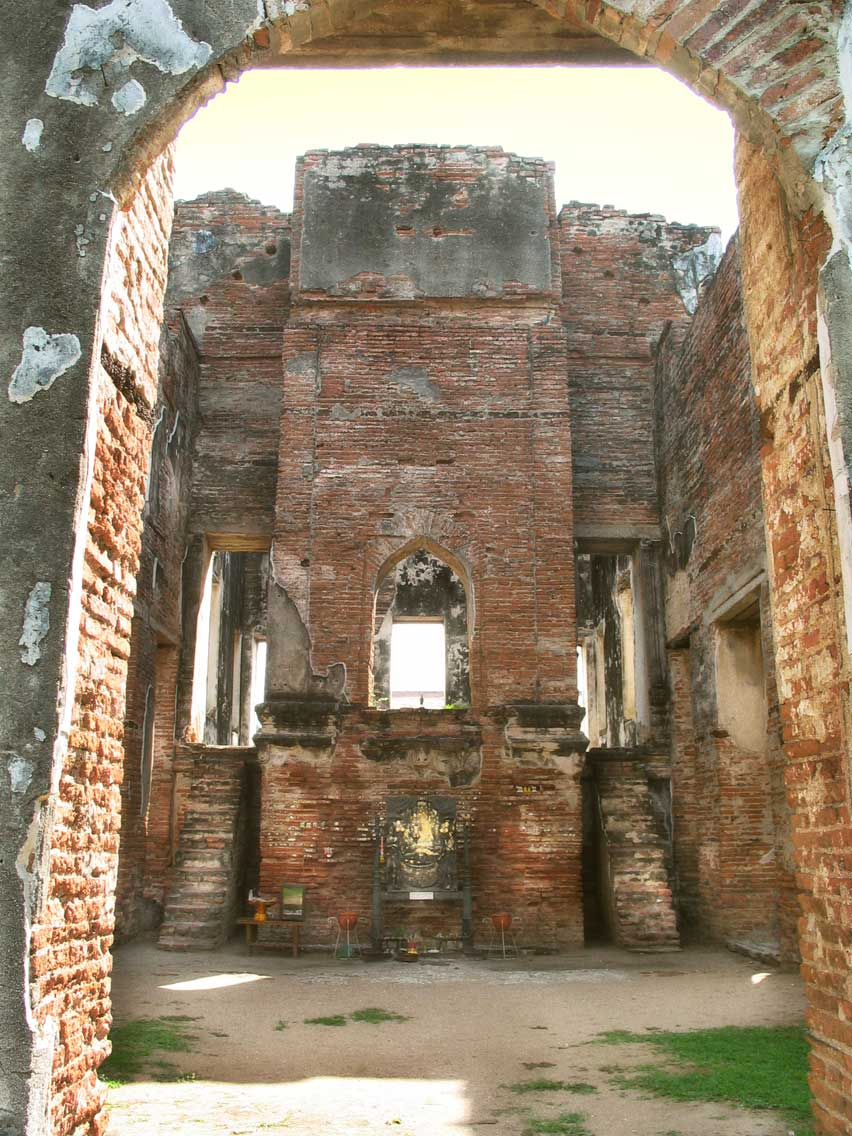
Dusit Sawan hall

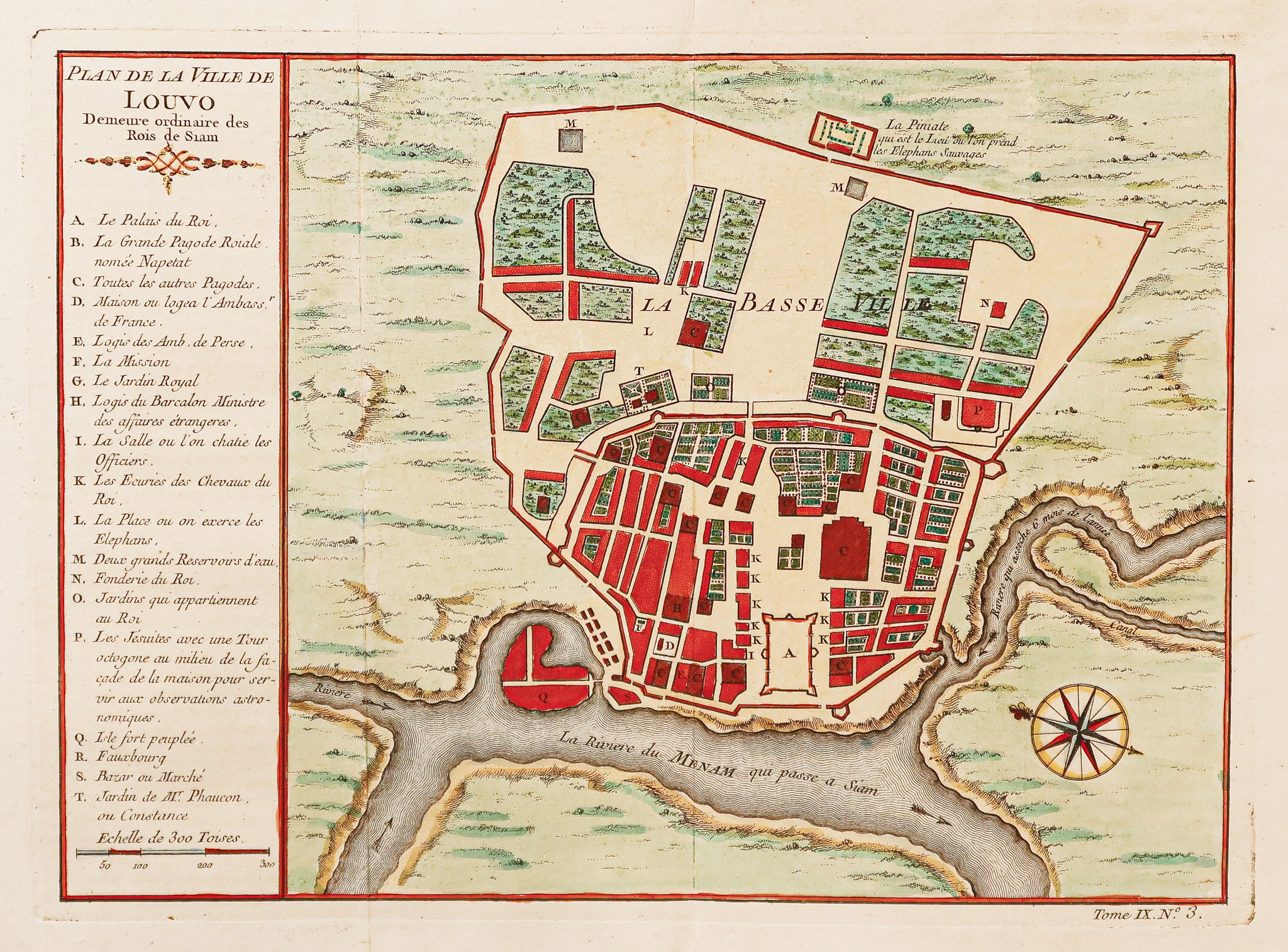
Lopburi City Map in 1750 by Bellin

In 1350, the Ayutthaya kingdom was founded by King Ramathibodi I, which merged Lavo with the kingdom ruled from Suphanburi called Subharnabhumi or Pan Pum, which according to the common Thai history to be identical with the Suvarnabhumi kingdom. This event had been recorded in the Chinese texts that called Thai as Xian-lo-guo or Siam-Lavo country.

At that time Lavo became a "Mueang Luk Luang", an important city ruled by a crown prince for several years in the beginning of Ayutthaya period. There were not any evidences the prosperity of Lavo was transferred from Lavo to Ayutthaya, but with time Lavo decreased in importance to become only a border town to the north of Ayutthaya.

In the reign of King Narai the Great, the 26th king of Ayutthaya, in the mid-17th century Lavo become an important city again. He commanded to reconstruct the palace at the same place of King Ramesuan's Palace as a summer palace, King Narai's Palace in 1666. Lavo thus served as a second capital, next to Ayutthaya, the king stayed here for about eight months a year.

== Rattanakosin era ==
After the time of King Narai, Lavo had been abandoned, until King Mongkut (Rama IV) of Rattanakosin kingdom had it restored to be used as an inland royal city.

Lavo had also been renamed to Lopburi in this period.

Later, in 1937, Prime Minister Field Marshal Plaek Phibunsongkhram desired to set up Lopburi as the military center of Thailand. Therefore, the city had been expanded. He laid out Lopburi city, with its modern center about 4 km. east of the historical center. His building style, Art Deco, is apparent along Narai Maharat Road. The improvements he made to the city are apparent to the present day.

== Archeological researches ==
- several flaked stone tools were discovered in Ban Mi district dated back to the Paleolithic Age by Karl Friedrich Sarasin in 1931.
- a number of tools, human burial sites and bronze accessories belong to Iron Age were found in Lop Buri river Basin in 1964.
- Bracelets and beads dated back 2700–3500 years were revealed at Ban Khok Charoen under the leadership of Helmut Loofs-Wissowa, prof. Chin You-di and William Watson in 1966–1970.
- Prehistoric human skeletons and clay jugs were found in Ban Tha Kae in 1979.
- A Copper source was discovered in Khao Wong Phrachan in 1986-1994 by archaeologists from the Fine Arts Department and the University of Pennsylvania
