= Charnvit Kasetsiri =

Thai historian

Charnvit Kasetsiri (Thai: ชาญวิทย์ เกษตรศิริ, RTGS: Chanwit Kasetsiri; born May 6, 1941) is a Thai historian. He is a professor emeritus of the Thammasat University and was its rector from 1994 to 1995.

== Early life and education ==
Born in Ban Pong district, Ratchaburi province, in Thai-Chinese and Mon family, Charnvit grew up in the neighbourhood of Phra Pradaeng, Bangkok Metropolitan Region.

He studied diplomacy and history at the Thammasat University in Bangkok, from 1960 to 1963, and graduated with Honours and the King Bhumibol Prize with a Bachelor of Arts in diplomacy. He then pursued a master's degree at Occidental College in Los Angeles, California. He obtained his Doctor of Philosophy in Southeast Asian history from Cornell University in 1972, under the supervision of O. W. Wolters and David K. Wyatt. He held a Rockefeller Scholarship from 1965 to 1970 during his studies in the United States.

== Career ==
He began his academic service with the university as a lecturer in the history department in 1973. He was appointed head of department in 1981–83. Subsequently, he was also appointed as the deputy director of Thai Khadi Institute, Thammasat University (1982–85) and the vice-president of Thammasat University (1983–88). He continued lecturing in the history department following his appointment as dean of the Faculty of Liberal Arts, Thammasat University. He was the rector of Thammasat University during the academic year 1994–95. He continues to teach at the history department after retirement in 2001.

From 2000 to 2003, he was director of the five Area Study Project, sponsored by the Thailand Research Fund. He also held the post of secretary of the Social Sciences and Humanity Textbook Foundation in Thailand. Among the overseas appointments he has held during his academic career were as visiting fellow at the Center for Southeast Asian Studies, Kyoto University in Japan from 1977 to 1978, visiting lecturer in Southeast Asian History at the University of California, Berkeley and University of California, Santa Cruz from 1978 to 1979, visiting lecturer on Thailand History at the University of Hawaiʻi in 1996, visiting fellow at the Institute of Southeast Asian Studies in Singapore in 1998, and visiting lecturer in Asian Studies at the University of Hawaiʻi in 2004.

== Selected publications ==
Charnvit has published numerous articles on Thai history. Among his book publications (in English) are:

- The Rise of Ayudhya: A History of Siam in the Fourteenth and Fifteenth Centuries. Kuala Lumpur: Oxford University Press, 1976
- International Workshop On Translation. Foundation for the Promotion of The Social Sciences and the Humanities Textbooks Project, Thailand, 1978
- Bibliography: Southeast Asian Studies in Thailand. Compiled with T. Petchlertanan and S. Saiyawong, Thailand-Japan Core Universities Program, Kyoto University, The Center for Southeast Asian Studies and Thammasat University, 1991.
- Sangkhalok-Sukhothai-Ayutthaya and Asia. Bangkok: Toyota Thailand Foundation, 2002
- Discovering Ayutthaya. with Michael Wright. Bangkok: Toyota Thailand Foundation, 2007
- Annotated bibliography on the Mekong. Compiled with Chris Baker. Mekong Press, 2008.
- Thai historiography. In: Pavin Chachavalpongpun, Routledge Handbook of Contemporary Thailand. Routledge, 2019.
