= Sukhothai province =

Province of Thailand

Coordinates: 17°0′21″N 99°49′35″E

Sukhothai สุโขทัย
- Province
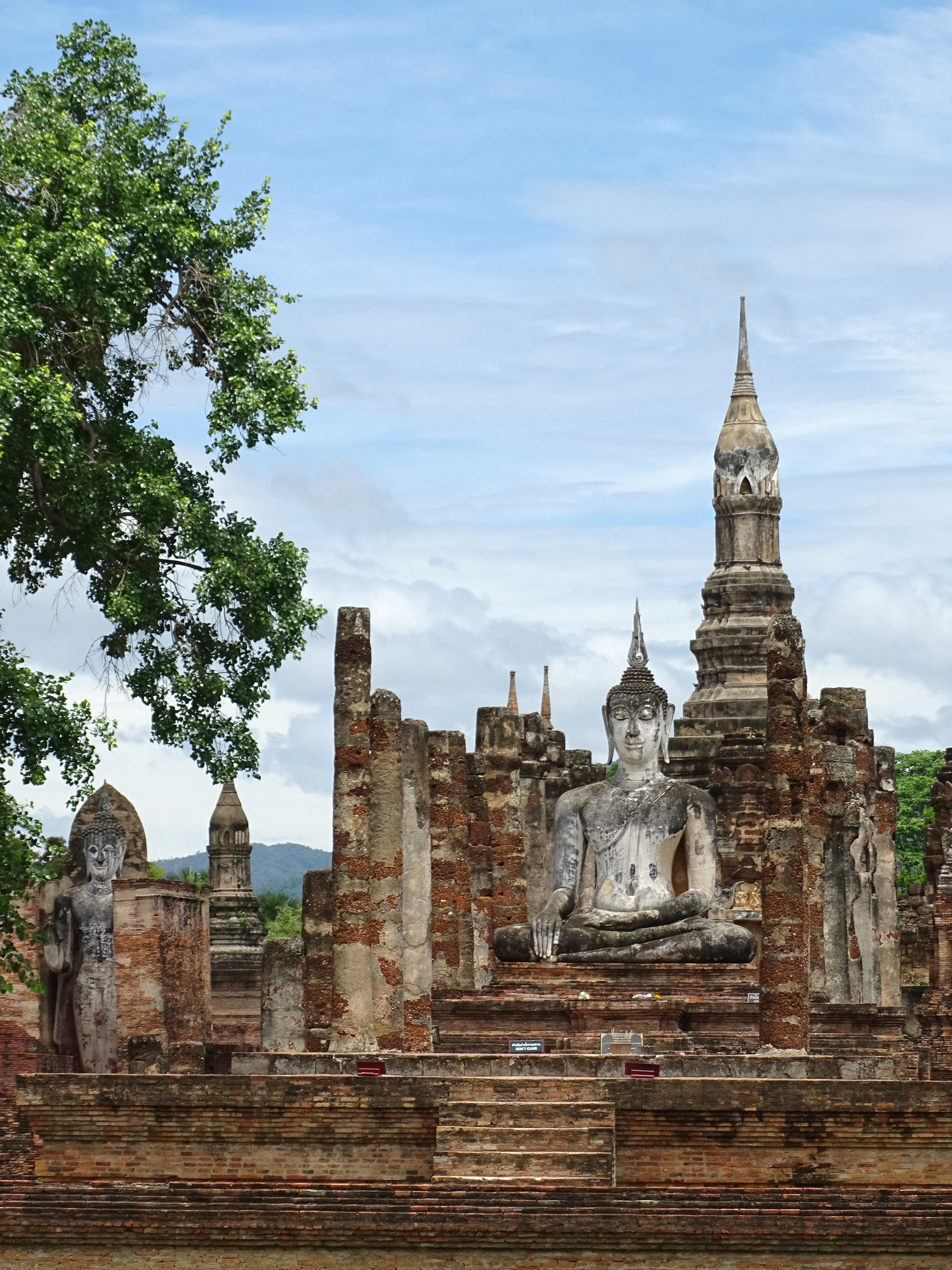
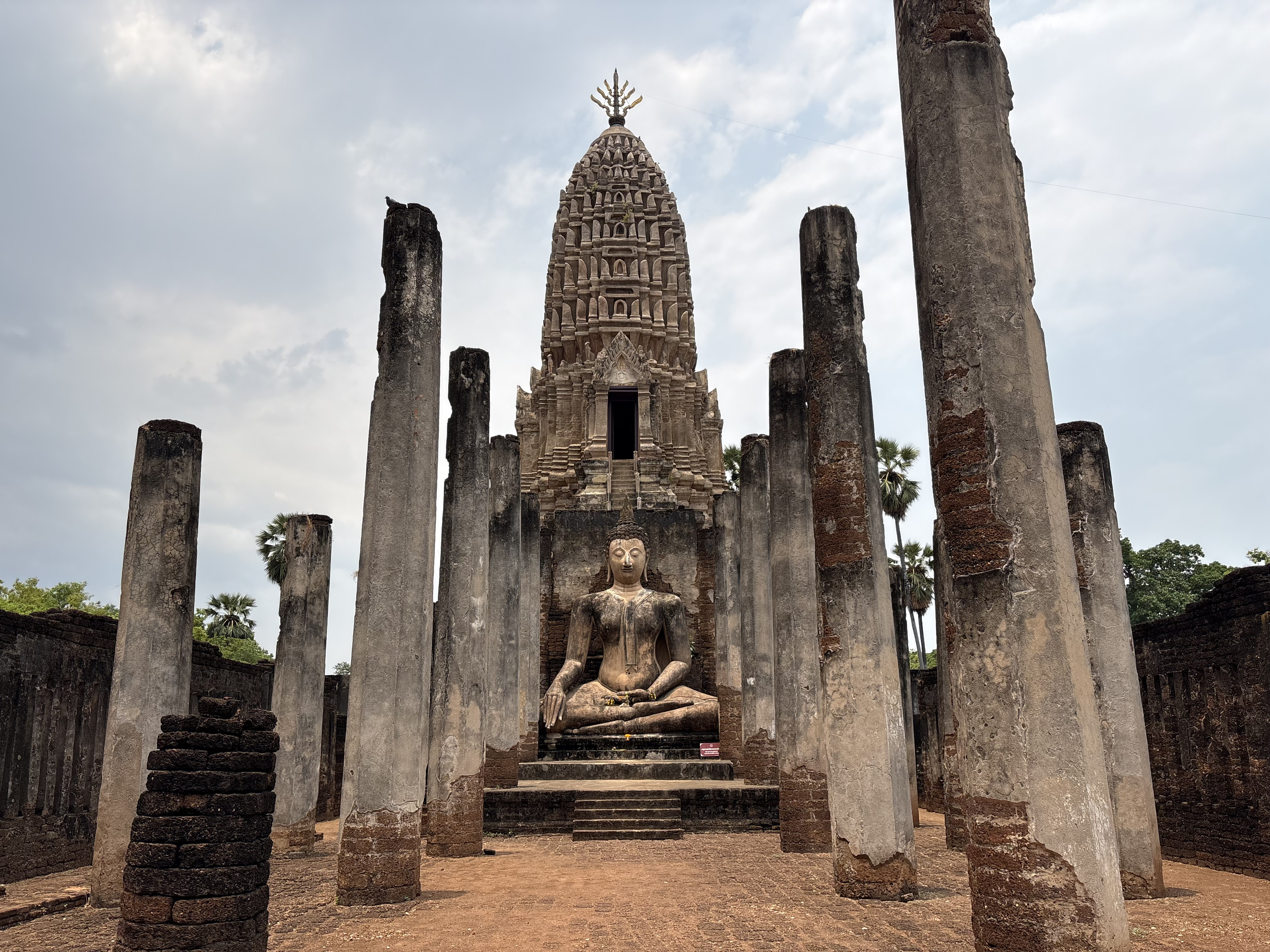
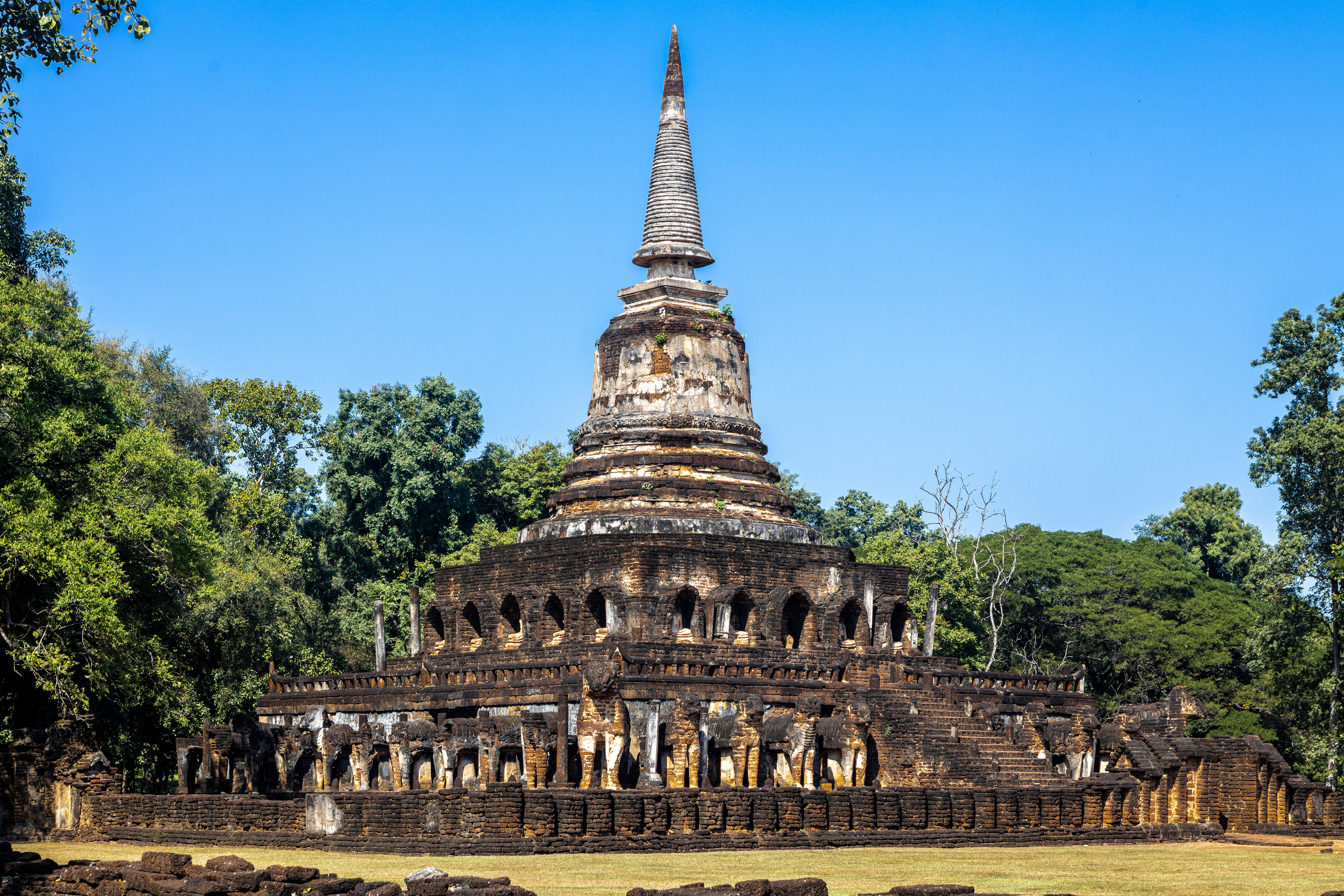
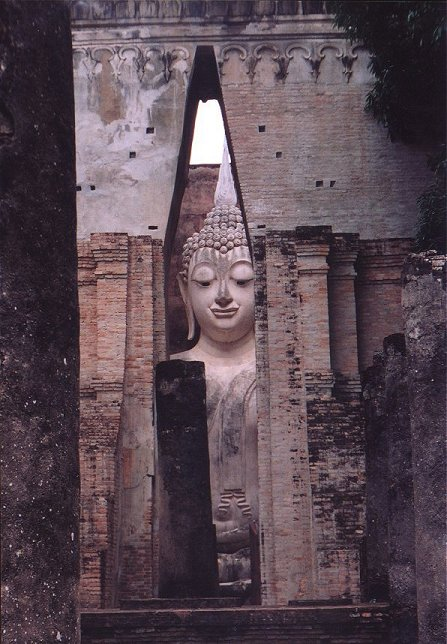
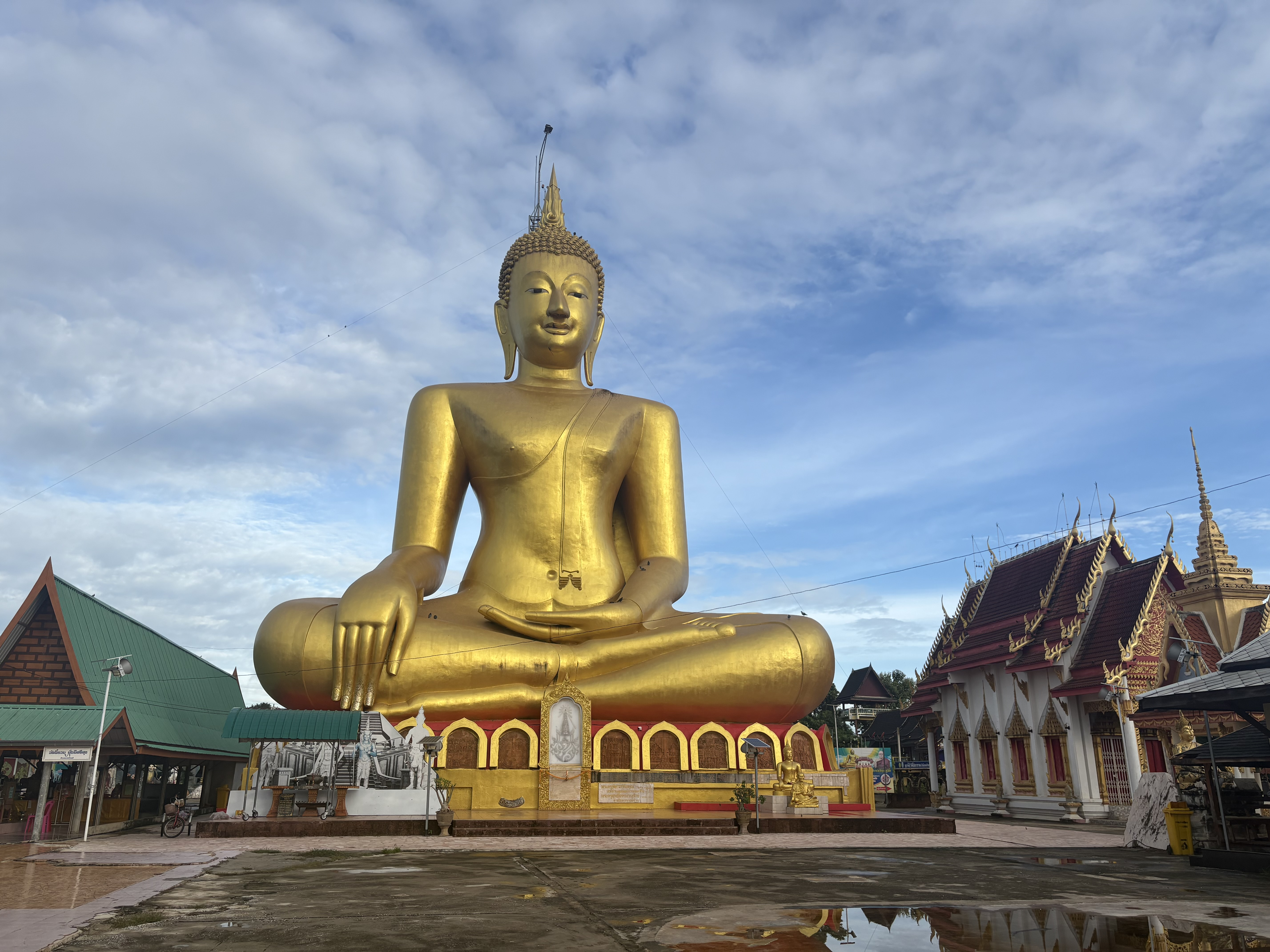
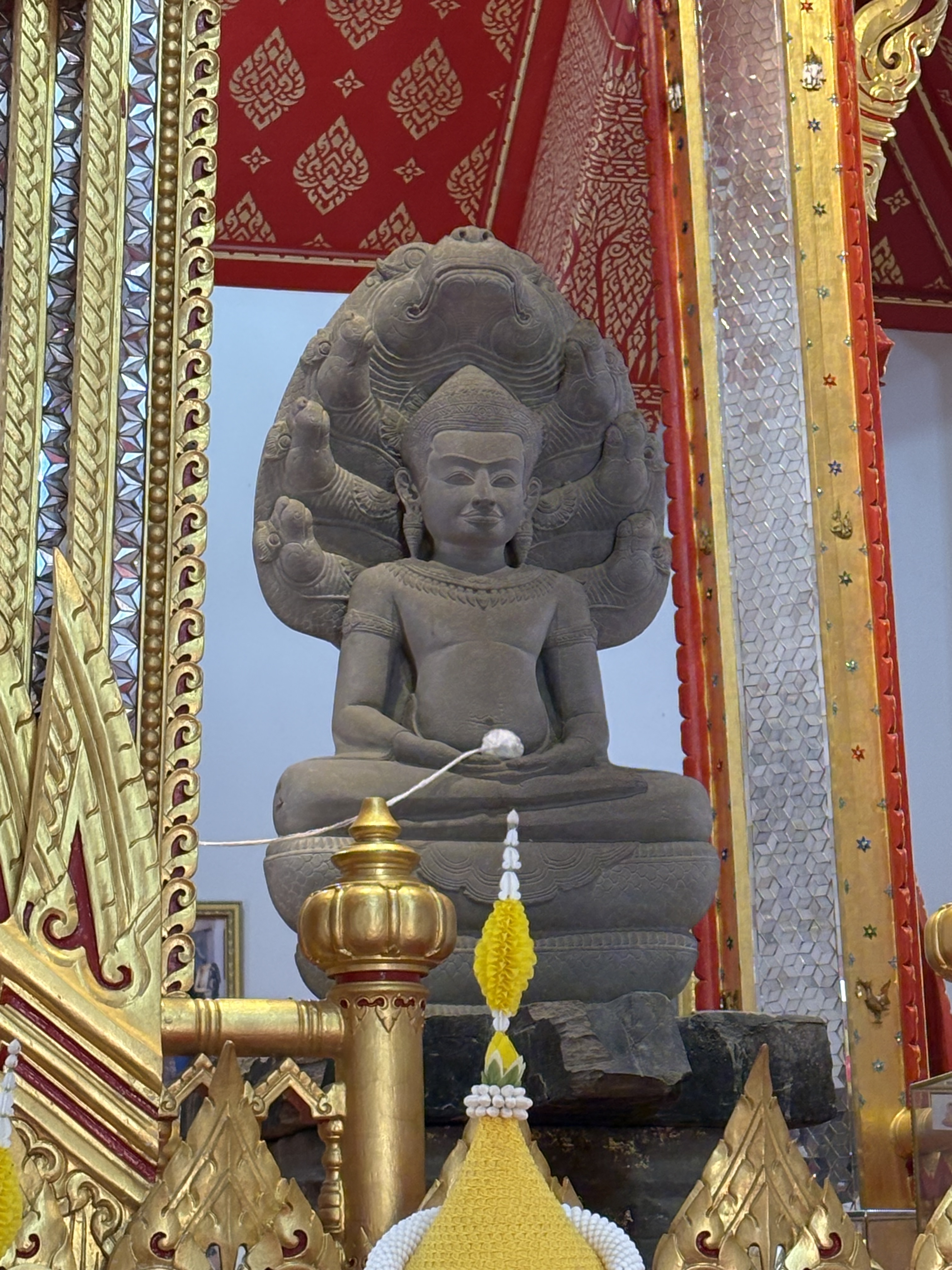
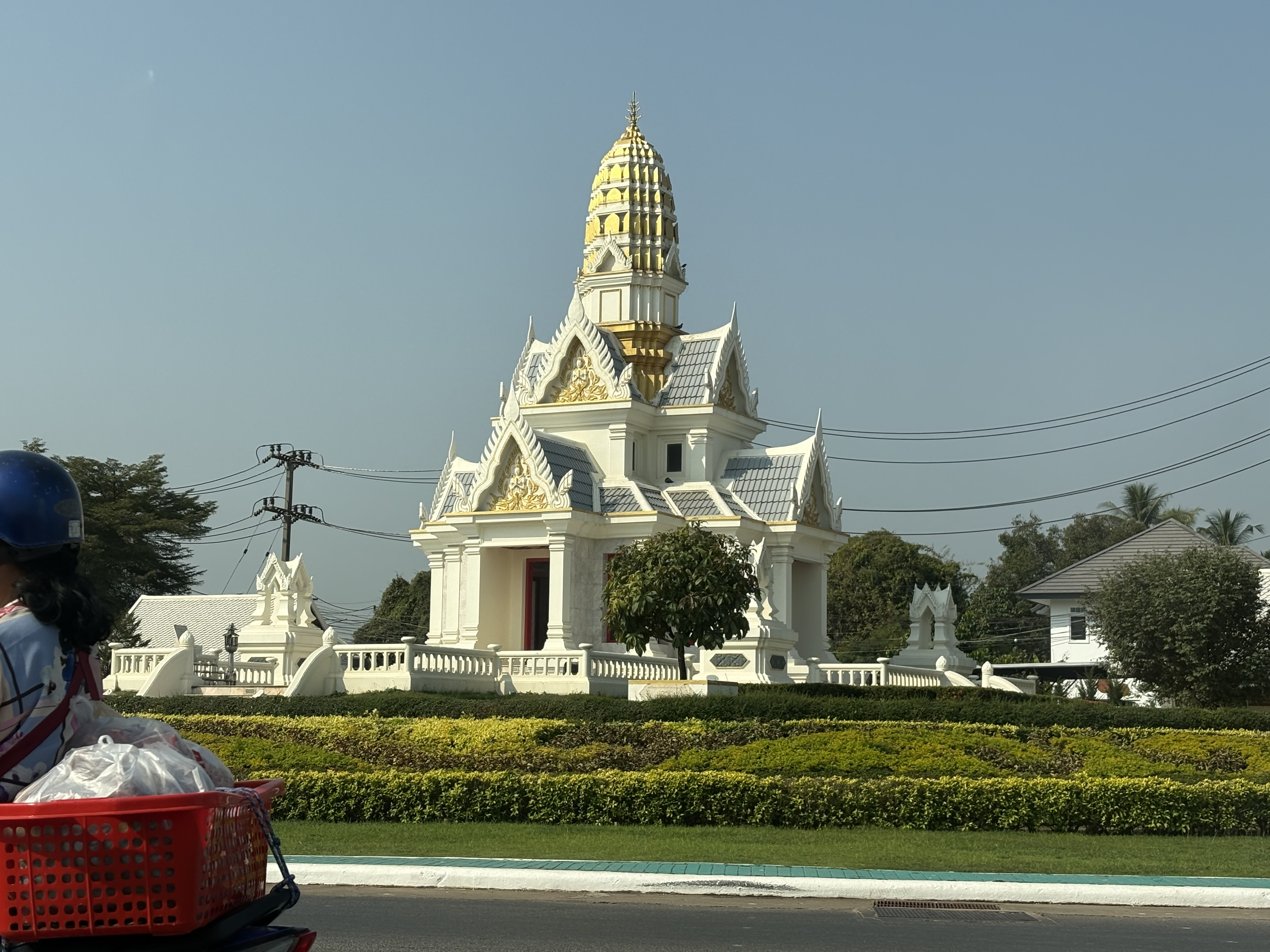
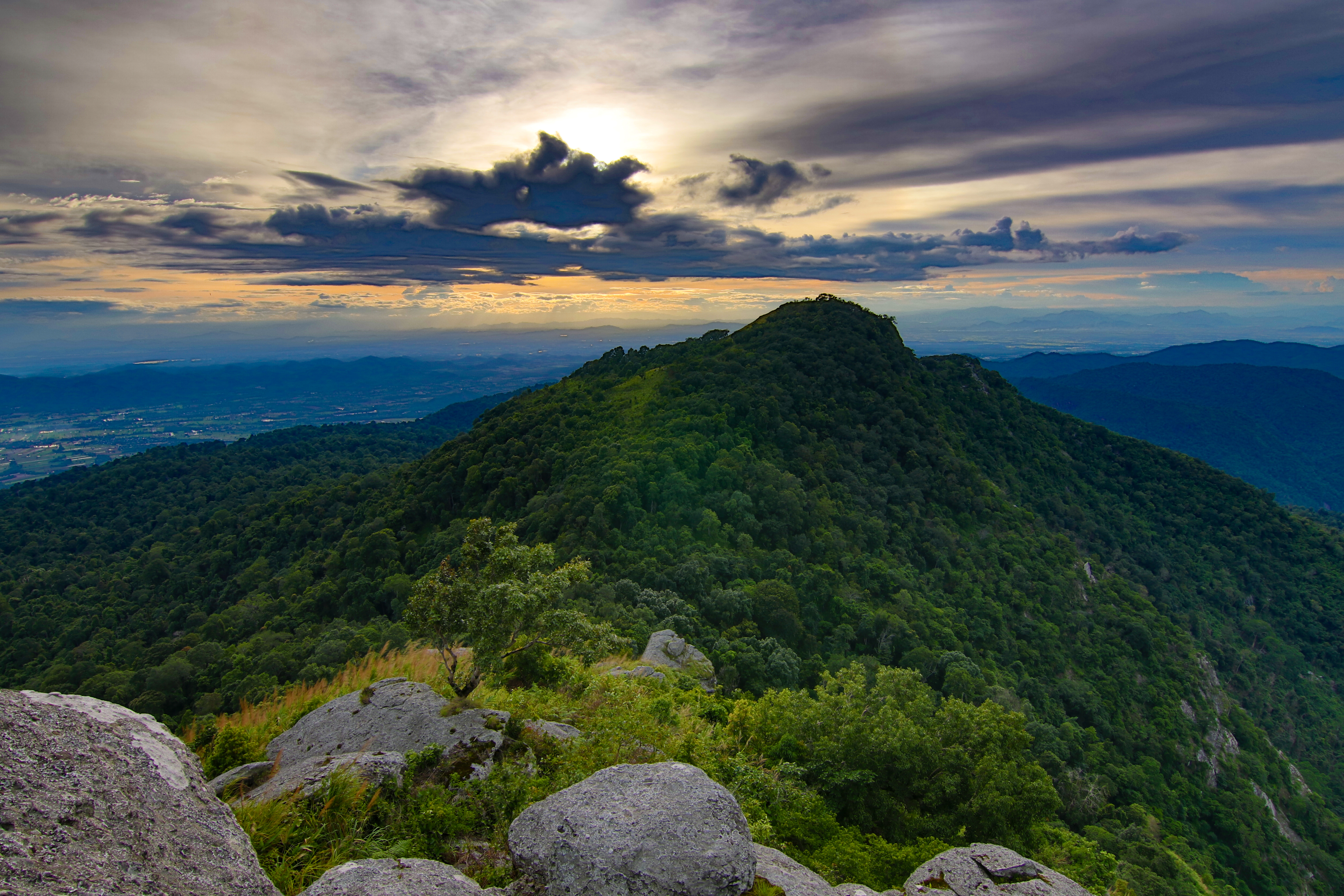
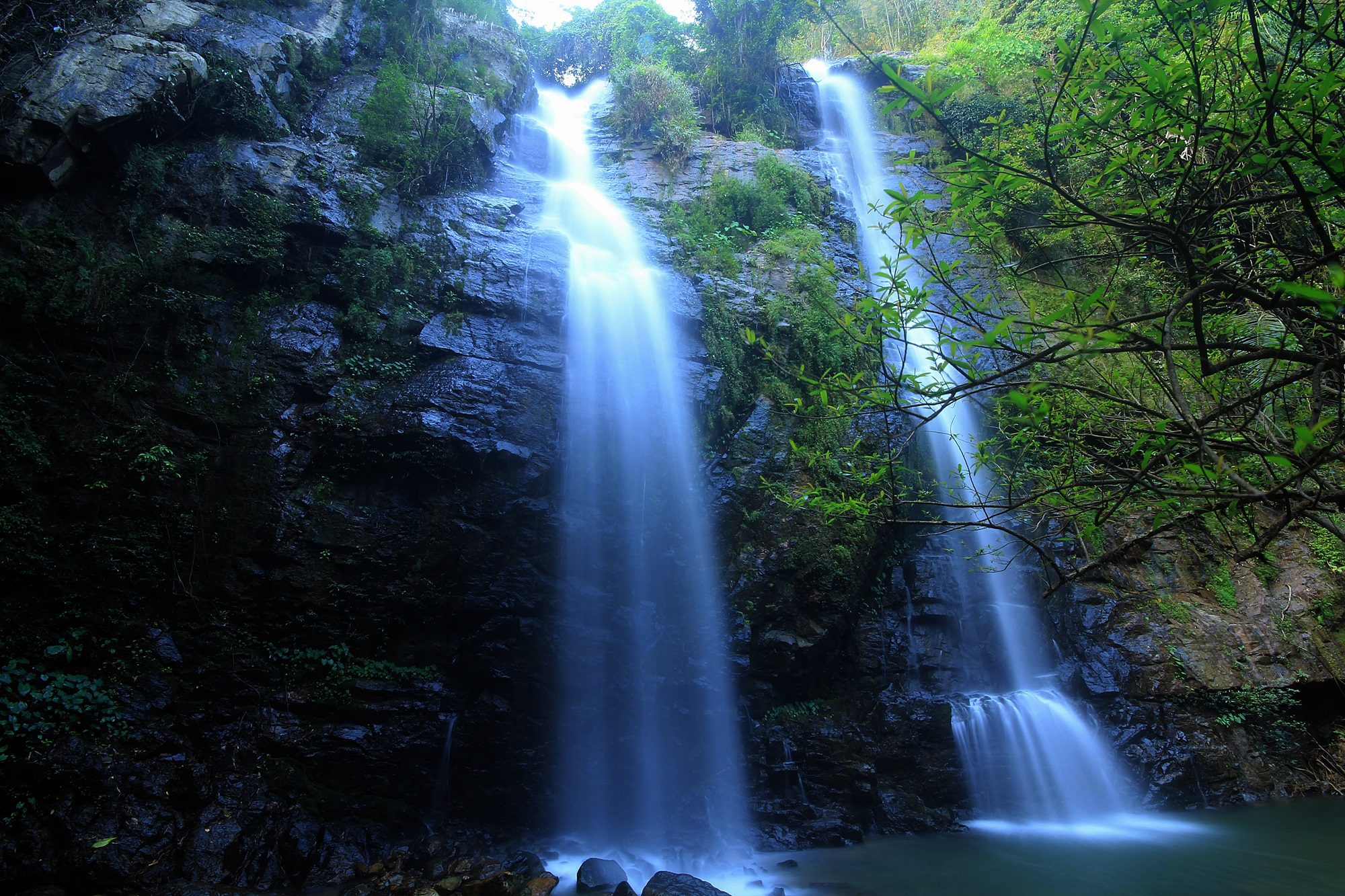
- Wat Maha That Wat Phra Si Rattana Mahathat Wat Chang Lom Wat Si Chum Wat Sopharam in Si Samrong Wat Thung Saliam Sawankhalok City Pillar Shrine Ramkhamhaeng National Park Si Satchanalai National Park

- Flag Seal
- Mottoes: มรดกโลกล้ำเลิศ กำเนิดลายสือไทย เล่นไฟลอยกระทง ดำรงพุทธศาสนา งามตาผ้าตีนจก สังคโลกทองโบราณ สักการแม่ย่าพ่อขุน รุ่งอรุณแห่งความสุข ("Amazing world heritages, origin of Lai Sue Thai, Loy Krathong fireworks, preserve Buddhism, beautiful Tin Chok cloth, ancient gold Sangkhalok, worship Mae Ya - Pho Khun, the dawn of happiness")
- Map of Thailand highlighting Sukhothai province
- Country: Thailand
- Capital: Sukhothai Thani

Government
  - Governor: Nopparit Sirikosol (since 2024)

Area
  - Total: 6,671 km^{2} (2,576 sq mi)
  - Rank: 29th

Population (2024)
  - Total: ▼573,388
  - Rank: 44th
  - Density: 86/km^{2} (220/sq mi)
  - Rank: 54th

Human Achievement Index
  - HAI (2022): 0.6292 "somewhat low" Ranked 55th

GDP
  - Total: baht 45 billion (US$1.6 billion) (2019)
- Time zone: UTC+7 (ICT)
- Postal code: 64xxx
- Calling code: 055
- ISO 3166 code: TH-64
- Website: sukhothai.go.th

Sukhothai (Thai: สุโขทัย, pronounced [sù.kʰǒː.tʰāj]) is a province in lower northern Thailand. Neighboring provinces are Phrae, Uttaradit, Phitsanulok, Kamphaeng Phet, Tak, and Lampang. Sukhothai is located in the Yom river basin which has served as an important lifeline of the region since antiquity. The name Sukhothai comes from Sanskrit meaning 'the dawn of happiness'.

The province is home to the capital city of the namesake 13th-century Sukhothai Kingdom, which is traditionally considered the first state of the Thai people. The ruins of the historical cities of Sukhothai; its capital, and Si Satchanalai; its important city to the north, make up the group of monuments registered as UNESCO World Heritage Sites. There has been evidence of human settlement in the area dating back to the later Iron Age. The ancient city of Sukhothai can be traced back to the 12th century around the same period as the reign of Jayavarman VII, before King Si Inthrathit founded the namesake kingdom, making the city its capital.

Rice production makes up majority of the province's economy, followed by sugarcane, durian, and tangerine productions. The province is considered a "minor tourist destination", receiving more than a million visitors in 2024, generating over THB 250 million. Tourist attractions include Sukhohtai and Si Satchanalai Historical Parks; both of which are UNESCO World Heritage Sites, two national parks, and one wildlife sanctuary. Visitors also come for its traditional production of Sangkhalok ceramic ware, and its annual celebration of Loy Krathong festival. UNESCO included the province as a part of the Creative Cities Network for the City of Crafts and Folk Arts in 2019.

== Etymology ==
The modern-day province of Sukhothai was named after the Sukhothai Kingdom, which its capital city of the same name is located in the province. The kingdom's name comes from Sanskrit sukha (सुख 'happiness') + udaya (उदय 'rise', 'emergence'), meaning 'dawn of happiness'.

== Geography ==
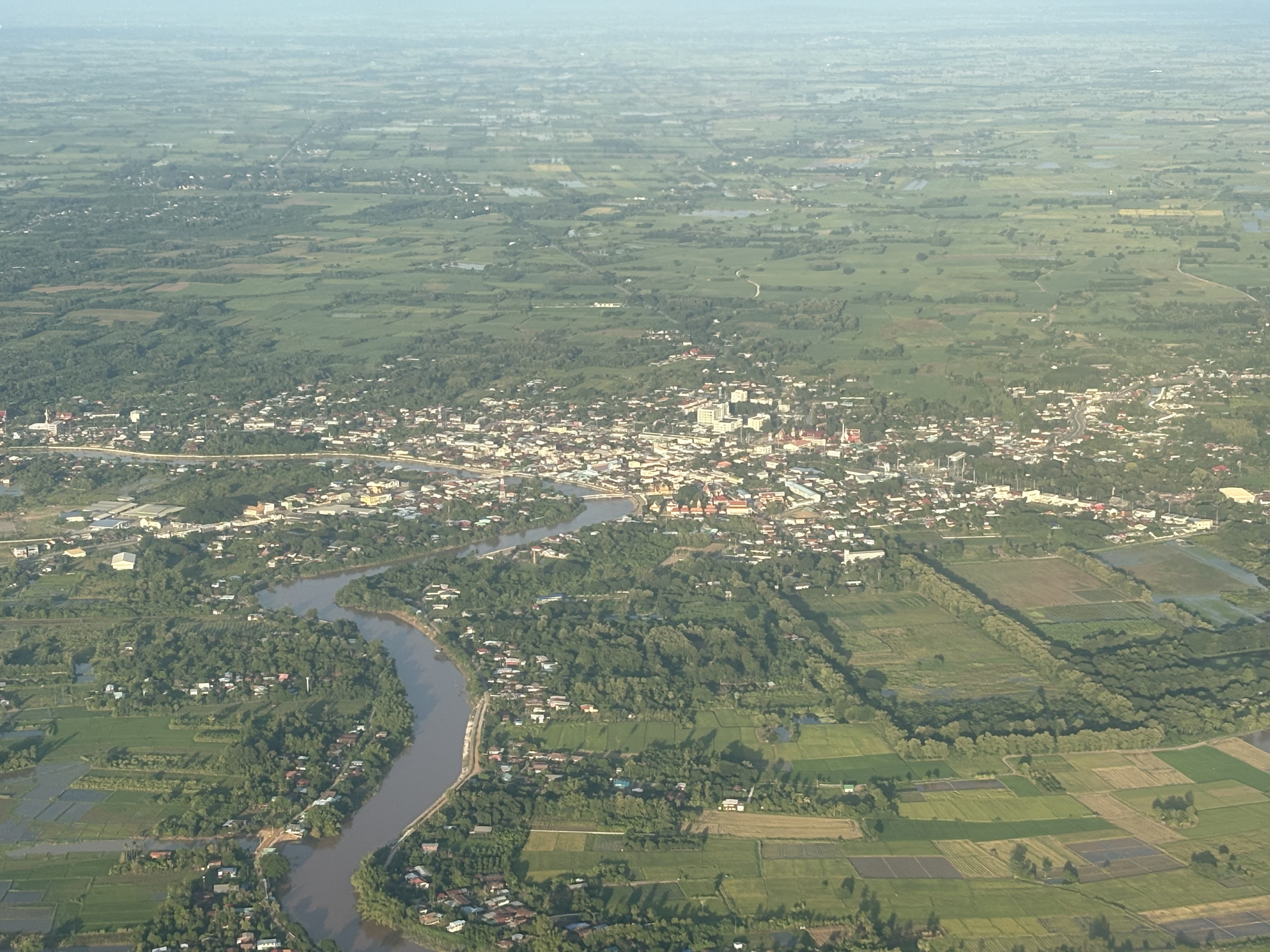
The Yom River as it flows through the town centre of Si Samrong district

Sukhothai is located in lower Northern Thailand and shares its borders with; clockwise from north, Phrae, Uttaradit, Phitsanulok, Kamphaeng Phet, and Lampang. The provincial capital, Sukhothai Thani is 427 kilometres (265 mi) north of Bangkok and 300 kilometres (190 mi) south of Chiang Mai. The province covers 6,671 km^{2} (2,576 sq mi) and the total forest area is 1,975 km^{2} (763 sq mi) or 29.6 percent of provincial area. The province is characterized by mostly mountainous and hilly topography at 59% of the area, while the remaining 39% are lowland plains. The highest point is Khao Luang range in the Ramkhamhaeng National Park at approximately 1,200 meters above sea level. The range has four main peaks: Khao Phu Kha, Khao Phra Mae Ya, Khao Chedi, and Pha Narai.

Most of the province lies within the basin of the Yom, its main river, while some eastern parts of Si Satchanalai and Si Nakhon belong to the Nan basin. The Yom flows for 170 kilometres (110 mi) through five of the province's nine districts from its source northward in Phayao, southward to Bang Rakam in Phitsanulok. The river overflows yearly causing floods during the monsoon season with only one sluice at Ban Hat Saphan Chan in Sawankhalok district being incapable of handling the massive water flow during the peak monsoon. During the monsoon season, water level in flood-prone areas can reach up to 1.20 meters, lasting 4 months. Many canals and streams arise from the Yom supplying most of the province, the majority of which are on the west bank of the river. The most important of which include the Mae Ramphan, Sarabop, Sam Phuang, and Mae Rak.

The province has a tropical savanna climate with three seasons; summer (February to May), monsoon season (Mau to October), and Winter (November to January).

== History ==
Historical affiliations

Dvaravati network, from about the 7th century
Haripuñjaya sphere, 10th – 11th centuries Angkorian sphere, 12th century – 1238 (Note: How far Angkorian authority reached into the upper valley is disputed; see the History section.)
Kingdom of Sukhothai 1238 – 1584
Kingdom of Ayutthaya 1584-1767
Kingdom of Thonburi 1767–1782
Kingdom of Siam 1782–1932
Kingdom of Thailand 1932–present

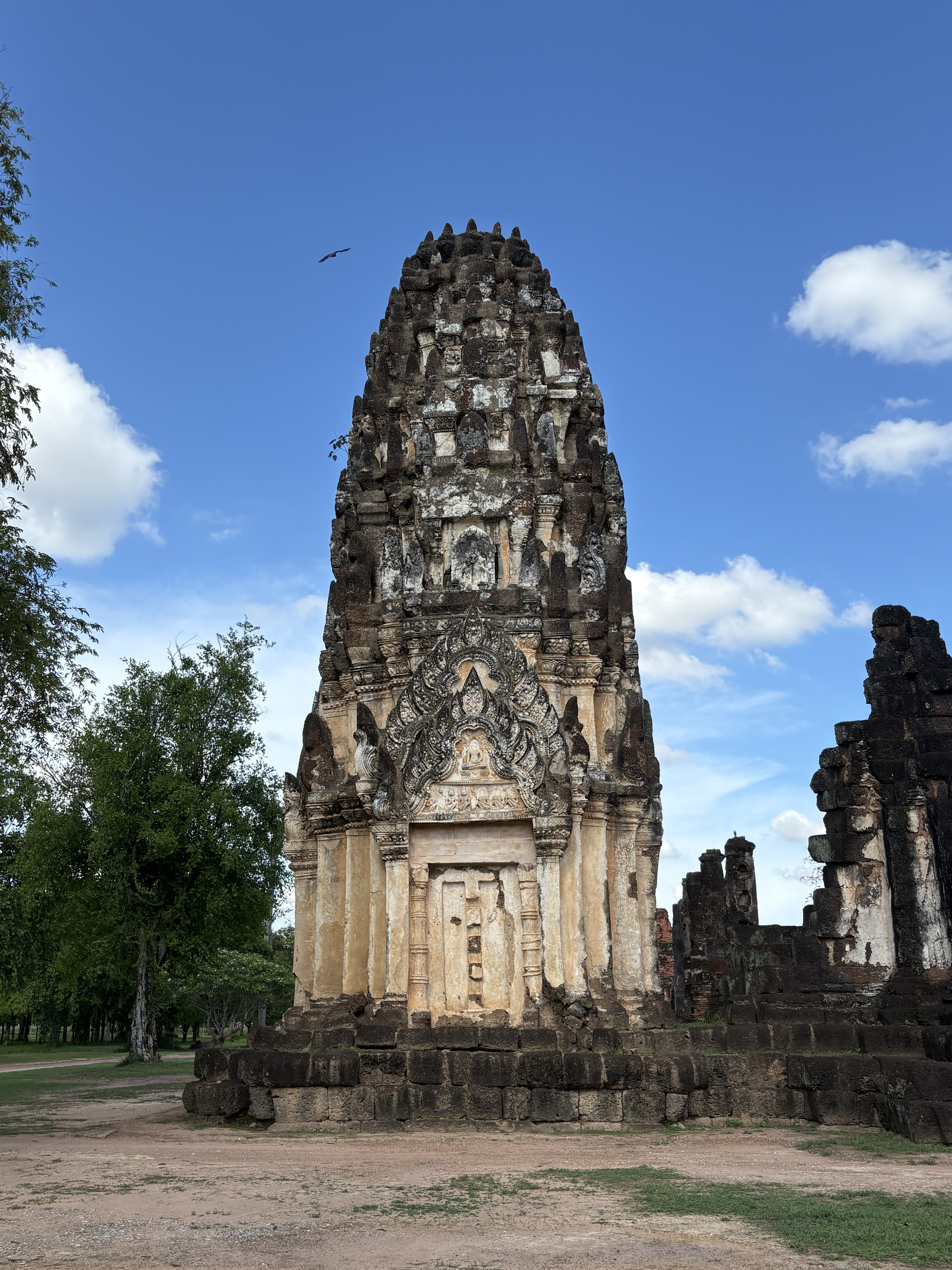
Prang of Wat Phra Phai Luang

=== Settlement and early centres ===
Earliest evidence of human settlement in modern-day Sukhothai province can be dated back to the late Iron Age with iron smelting as a main drive. Survey in the basin of the Mae Lamphan (แม่ลำพัน), in the hills of Ban Dan Lan Hoi district on the Lampang border, has recorded more than thirty sites with settlement over 3,000 years old. Among them are ancient mines at Ban Wang Hat (บ้านวังหาด) and Ban Taling Chan (บ้านตลิ่งชัน), and more than a hundred iron-smelting furnaces. Excavation at one smelting site beside the Kong Khai stream in 2018 placed production between 1128 and 1280 by thermoluminescence and radiocarbon. Graves of the late Metal Age beside the smelting grounds held iron machetes, chisels, axes and spears of the forms made there.

By the 9th century CE, the settlement expanded to the hillside of the Khao Luang mountain range and grew into bigger towns with Dvaravati cultural influences. The area came under cultural sphere of Khmer Empire by the 12th century CE, as evidenced by the construction of a Prang on Khao Pu Cha (Khiri Mat district) and Prasat Ta Pha Daeng (Sukhothai Historical Park). The city of Sukhothai itself can be traced back to the 12-th century CE, during the reign of Jayavarman VII of Khmer. At the time the city was built centered around the Wat Phra Phai Luang (Sukhothai Historical Park). In the north of the province, at Chaliang on the Yom, the Fine Arts Department dates the first occupation to the 3rd and early 4th centuries and reports a burial ground in use from about the mid-5th to the mid-11th century. Its grave goods include terracotta bars of a type known from Dvaravati sites and carnelian beads heat-treated by an Indian technique, which the department reads as contact with India through coastal Dvaravati towns. Chris Baker and Pasuk Phongpaichit count some thirty moated sites in the plain around the town, resembling those of the Chao Phraya plain and the Isan plateau over the previous five centuries. They also note earthworks west of the town that direct water down from the hills, in what they call the characteristic style of Tai settlement. Two earth dams west of Si Satchanalai, 750 and 1,065 m long, have been read as irrigation works of the same kind. Thanon Phra Ruang, the line of some 123 km linking Si Satchanalai and Kamphaeng Phet to Sukhothai, has been read as a canal rather than a road, though Chusak notes that the question is unsettled.

How far Angkorian authority reached is disputed. Baker and Pasuk find no administrative trace of it west of the Khmer country. The plain has yielded none of the temple-endowment inscriptions characteristic of Angkorian provinces, and Jayavarman VII's hospital foundations reach no further west than Prachin Buri in eastern Thailand, which they take to show cultural influence rather than administration.

Wyatt traces the ancestry of the rulers of late-13th-century Sukhothai to people who came down the Nan from the U River valley, noting that the Sukhothai dialect stands close to the Phuan of Xiang Khouang. He reads their movement as the working of an ultimogeniture in which elder sons were sent south to find their own towns while the youngest inherited. They moved into country already held by Mōn and Khmer speakers. He also treats Sukhothai and Si Satchanalai as a paired-city polity rather than as a capital and a dependency. That Si Satchanalai and Chaliang are one place was settled only slowly. Damrong sent an officer in 1915 to look for Chaliang at Mueang Kaliang Suan Taeng in modern Si Nakhon district and accepted that identification at first. Between 1940 and 1942 he concluded that the two names belonged to one city. The Chaliang centre stands about 1.5 km downstream of the walled city, inside a loop of the Yom, and the walled city has a laterite wall on an earth bank with two further ditch-and-bank lines outside it. Mueang Bang Khlang, on the boundary of the modern Sawankhalok and Thung Saliam districts, lay between them and is named in several Sukhothai inscriptions. A brick wall called Ho Rop closes the pass on the Thung Saliam boundary with Thoen, and is read as the western checkpoint on that side.

Reporting Roxanna Brown, David K. Wyatt places the earliest unglazed wares from the Si Satchanalai kilns as early as the mid-12th century. He notes that the oldest of them are dug into the high banks of the Yom, where fuel could be brought by boat. On his reading the industry was not yet a trade of international proportions in the first half of the 13th century. It must have grown from local to regional scale between about 1150 and 1250 to reach the size it had by the 14th, when more than 100 kilns were firing at any one time. The kiln field lies at Ban Ko Noi and Ban Pa Yang on both banks of the Yom. Chusak Satienpattanodom counts not fewer than 200 kiln remains across some five to six square kilometres, the oldest of them tunnel kilns cut into the ground. He dates the earliest stoneware from them to the 10th or 11th century, and would call it Chaliang ware rather than Mon ware.

=== The kingdom ===
The kingdom is conventionally dated from the 13th century, although the town itself is older. The exact year is unknown, but according to the Fine Arts Office it was between 1238 and 1257. It has long been described as the first independent Thai kingdom, founded by Pho Khun Si Inthrathit after the defeat of the Khmers. More recent work reads the events of 1238 differently, as a victory by one local lord associated with Angkor over another holding a Khmer title. The victor, Pha Mueang, had himself received a title, a regalia sword and a princess in marriage from the ruler at Angkor. Etymological analysis of Khom Sabat Khlon Lamphong's name finds no element of rank in it, and the term Khom is not a reliable ethnic marker. Sukhothai enjoyed a golden age under their third king, King Ramkhamhaeng, who was credited with creating the Khmer-derived Thai alphabet which is essentially the same as that in use today. He also laid the foundation for politics, the monarchy and religion, as well as expanding its circle of influence. Sukhothai was later ruled by many kings. The province is most known for the historic city of Sukhothai, the capital of the Sukhothai Kingdom. It is about 12 km from the modern New Sukhothai city. Not far from Sukhothai are the Si Satchanalai Historical Park and the Kamphaeng Phet Historical Park. Both were cities in the former Sukhothai kingdom and at the same time period. Sukhothai Kingdom was merged into Ayutthaya Kingdom in 1438. Srisak Vallibhotama, reading inscriptions 46 and 93, counts Sukhothai among seven modern provinces that covered the kingdom's core. The town mutinied against Ayutthaya in 1462, and Borommatrailokkanat moved his court to Phitsanulok in the following year.

=== Modern history ===
The province was at first known as Sawankhalok; it was renamed to Sukhothai in 1939.

== Protected areas ==
Ramkhamhaeng National Park in the south and Si Satchanalai National Park in the northwest are the two national parks located in the province, which falls under the supervision of regional office 14 (Tak). The two national parks saw 22,767 and 13,617 visitors respectively in 2024. Tham Chao Ram Wildlife Sanctuary, comprising 341 km^{2} (132 sq mi), is the province's only wildlife sanctuary.

== Demographics ==
Per 2020 census, Sukhothai province has a population of 587,883; consisting of 284,949 male and 302,934 female. Mueang is the biggest district making up approximately 17.5% of the population, while Si Nakhon is the least populous district comprising approximately 4% of the province. Per a 2025 report, 460 Thai citizens from Sukhothai province are working or have applied for a working visa abroad. The majority of which, 211, are in Taiwan.

In 2016, approximately 2,300 inhabitants are registered ethnic minorities, consisting of Hmong (33.9%), Karen (33.6%), Mien (27.5%), and Lisu (4.9%). All of them reside in Si Satchanalai district

== Economy ==
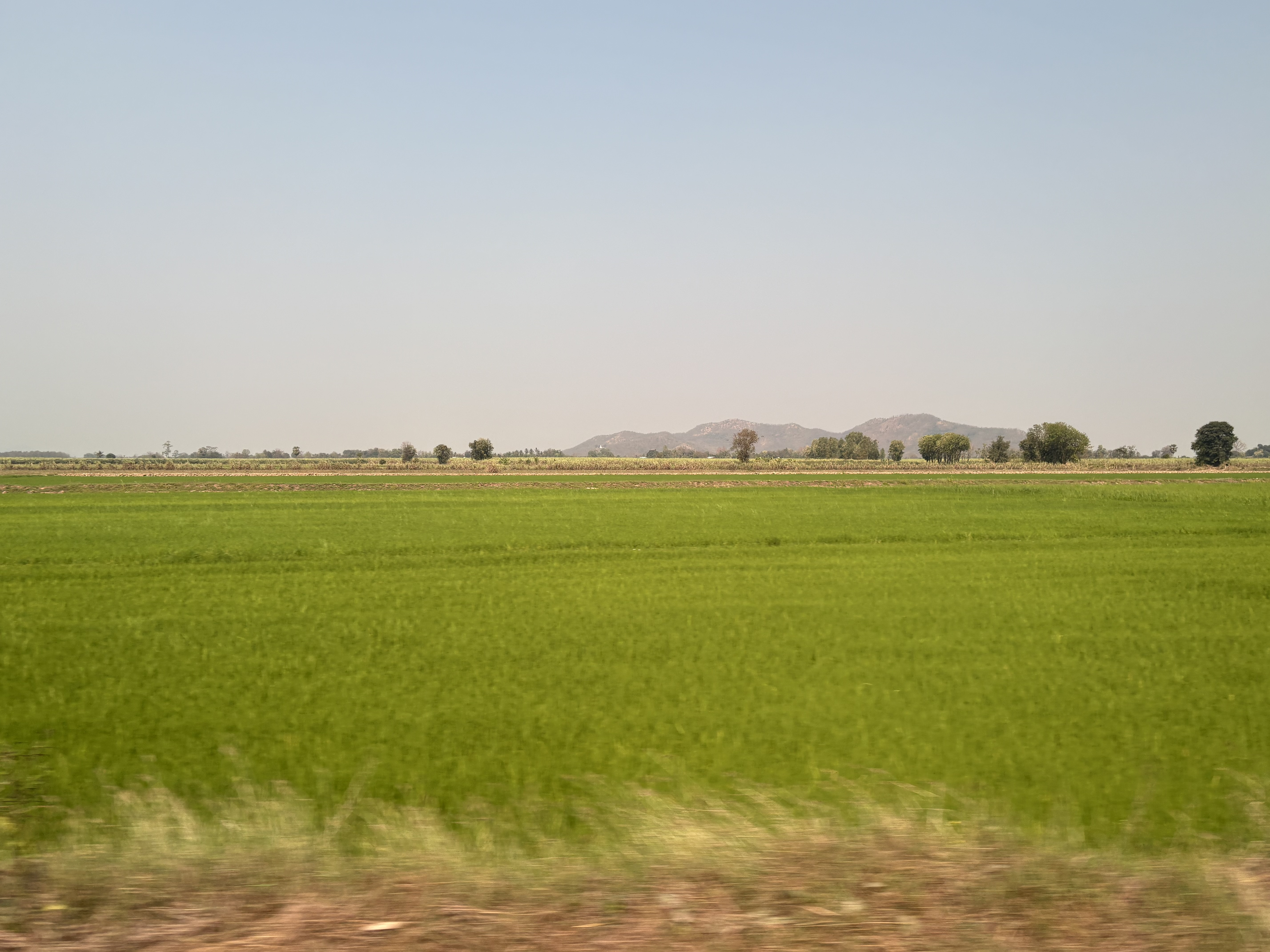
Rice fields in Mueang Bang Khlang, Sawankhalok district

The Gross Provincial Product (GPP) as of 2022 valued at THB 53,021 million. Majority of Sukhothai province's economy is made up of agriculture sector at 50% of its GPP, following by service sector at 42%. Rice production is the most important part of its economy, valued at more than THB 7,000 million as of 2020–2021. Sugarcane production follows at over THB 3,200 million, durians at THB 828 million and tangerines at THB 825 million.

Agriculture makes up 59% of the province's land use; nearly 57% of which are for growing rice. Its major agricultural products include rice, sugar canes, and cassavas, among others. The province has three agricultural products with geographical indication specific to Sukhothai:

- Mae Sin tangerine (ส้มแม่สิน; som mae sin): tangerines grown in Mae Sin, and Mae Sa subdistricts of Si Satchanalai district with 32,734 rai of production area as of 2023.
- Sukhothai sapodilla (ละมุดสุโขทัย; lamut sukhothai): sapodillas with extreme sweetness grown in Sawankhalok district (Tha Thong, Pak Nam, Khlong Krachong, and Mueang Bang Yom) and Si Samrong district (Sam Ruean, and Wat Ko) with 4,355 rai of production area as of 2023.
- Mae Ya plum mangoes (มะยงชิดแม่ย่า; mayong chit mae ya): mayong chit (plum mangoes) that are from trees budded or grafted from the mae ya tree, grown in Sawankhalok district, Si Samrong district, and Mueang Sukhothai district.

Sukhothai is considered one of the country's most important producers of sugarcanes owing to its climate and topography. More than 2.6 million tonnes of sugarcanes were produced in 2021-2022, making it the fourth biggest producer in Northern Thailand. Nam Oi Nuek is a local stye of brown sugar still produced in small scale in Ko Ta Liang, Si Samrong district. The production is labour-intensive and takes 5 months to make, making it a disappearing craft of the province.

Bananas are also considered an important economic crop of Sukhothai province with over 7,000 rai of Thai banana plantation throughout the province. The number is also on the rise. Nong Tum in Kong Krailat district is home to one of Thailand's biggest centers of banana processing, where its cooperative enterprise founded in 1996 generating more than THB 1 billion in 2021 from processed banana products. The biggest plantain plantation is located in Khlong Krachong, Sawankhalok district making up more than 7,000 rai. The locale is noted for its cooperative enterprise, manufacturing of container products from plantain leaves, exporting both domestically and internationally.

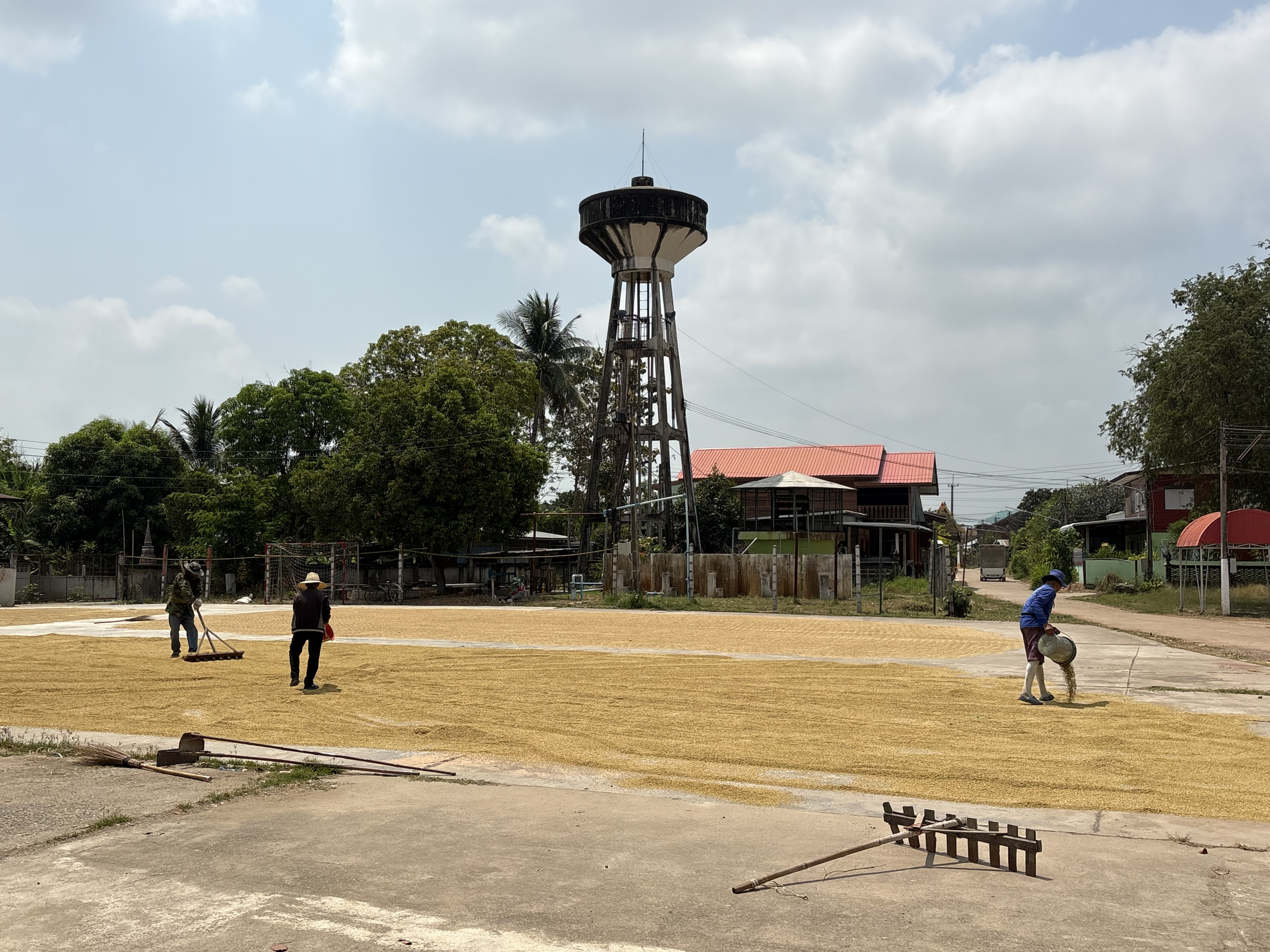
Farmers drying rice paddy after harvest in March, at a temple in Kong Krailat district

Fishery makes up another important part of the province's economy with over 5,000 tonnes of fish caught in 2022. Fishery has been historically significant with the local communities, with Yom River and its branches being the natural sources. The abundance of fish was associated with the local belief that "the Yom will never run out of fish". The number of fish in the wild has however decreased over the years. Kong Krailat district is an important fish processing hub, producing pla ra (fermented fish) and nam pla (fish sauce).

Sukhothai is home to the regional factory and office for lower Northern Thailand of the state enterprise Dairy Farming Promotion Organization of Thailand, located in Si Nakhon district. Dairy farming in the province began in 1995, however it faced a decline beginning in 2003 with 66 dairy farms remaining as of 2010.

18 products from Sukhothai province are listed OTOP.

=== Tourism ===
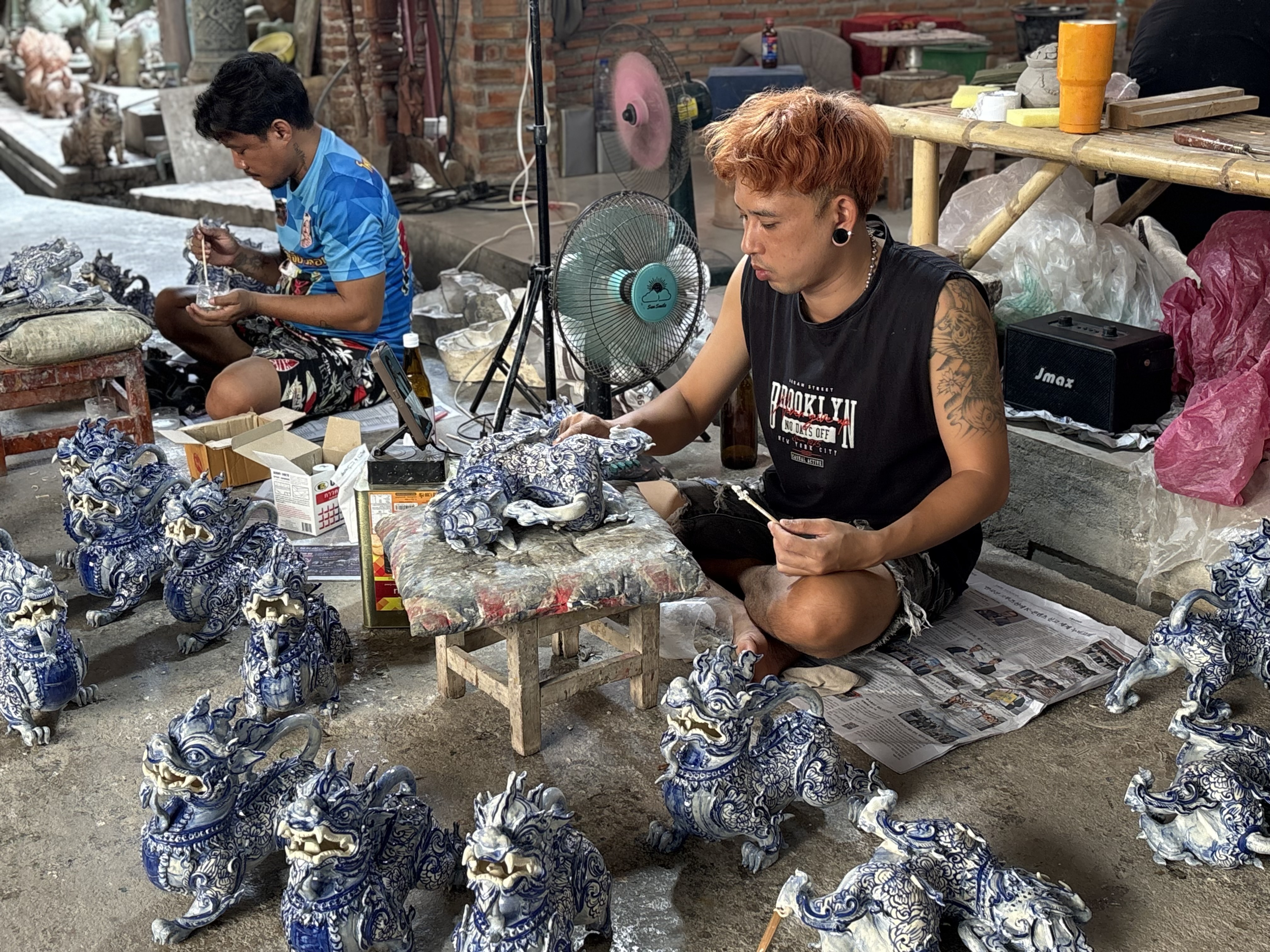
A Sangkhalok ware workshop in Sukhothai old town

Tourism sector generated over THB 250 million for the province in 2024. In the same year, Sukhothai province received 1,043,697 visitors; more than 90% of which are Thai nationals. That is below the peak of 1.5 million visitors in 2019. The share of foreign visitors has also not returned to its pre-2019 level of more than 27% of the total.

In the country's tourism, Sukhothai is considered one of the "minor destinations". Tourism Authority of Thailand (TAT) noted the province for its two historical parks, Sukhothai Historical Park and Si Satchanalai Historical Park, and for the preserved old town centre of Sawankhalok. It also named its craft centres, among them Sangkhalok ceramic ware, traditional pa tin chok weaving and pha mak khlon ("mud-fermented cloth") dyeing in Si Satchanalai district. TAT also recommends two dishes; kuai tiao sukhothai (Sukhothai noodles), and khao poep; both unique to the province.

Loy Krathong is an annual festival celebrated all over the country with history dating back to the Sukhothai Kingdom, hence it is one of the province's most important event of the year. Sukhothai Historical Park hosts the event yearly with more than 50,000 visitors in a day and accumulated over 300,000 visitors across multiple days of the celebration in 2025.

== Administrative divisions ==
Map of nine districts

=== Provincial government ===
The province is divided into nine districts (amphoes). These are further divided into 86 subdistricts (tambons) and 782 villages (mubans).

1. Mueang Sukhothai
2. Ban Dan Lan Hoi
3. Khiri Mat
4. Kong Krailat
5. Si Satchanalai
6. Si Samrong
7. Sawankhalok
8. Si Nakhon
9. Thung Saliam

=== Local government ===
As of 26 November 2019 there are: one Sukhothai Provincial Administration Organisation (ongkan borihan suan changwat) and 21 municipal (thesaban) areas in the province. Sukhothai, Sawankhalok and Si Satchanalai have town (thesaban mueang) status. Further 18 subdistrict municipalities (thesaban tambon). The non-municipal areas are administered by 69 Subdistrict Administrative Organisations - SAO (ongkan borihan suan tambon).

== Culture ==
=== Symbols ===
The provincial seal features King Ram Khamhaeng the Great sitting on the Managkhasila Asana throne. Ram Khamhaeng was the third king of Sukhothai Kingdom during his rule, he introduced Lai Sue Thai as the Thai's first writing system, and adopted Theravada Buddhism as the national religion.

The provincial tree is Afzelia xylocarpa. The provincial flower is the Lotus (Nymphaea lotus). The provincial aquatic life is the ghost shetfish (Kryptopterus vitreolus) according to local legend about Phra Ruang, the one with sacred speech.

The provincial slogan is "Amazing world heritages, origin of Lai Sue Thai, Loy Krathong fireworks, preserve Buddhism, beautiful Tin Chok cloth, ancient gold Sangkhalok, worship Mae Ya - Pho Khun, the dawn of happiness".

=== Religions ===
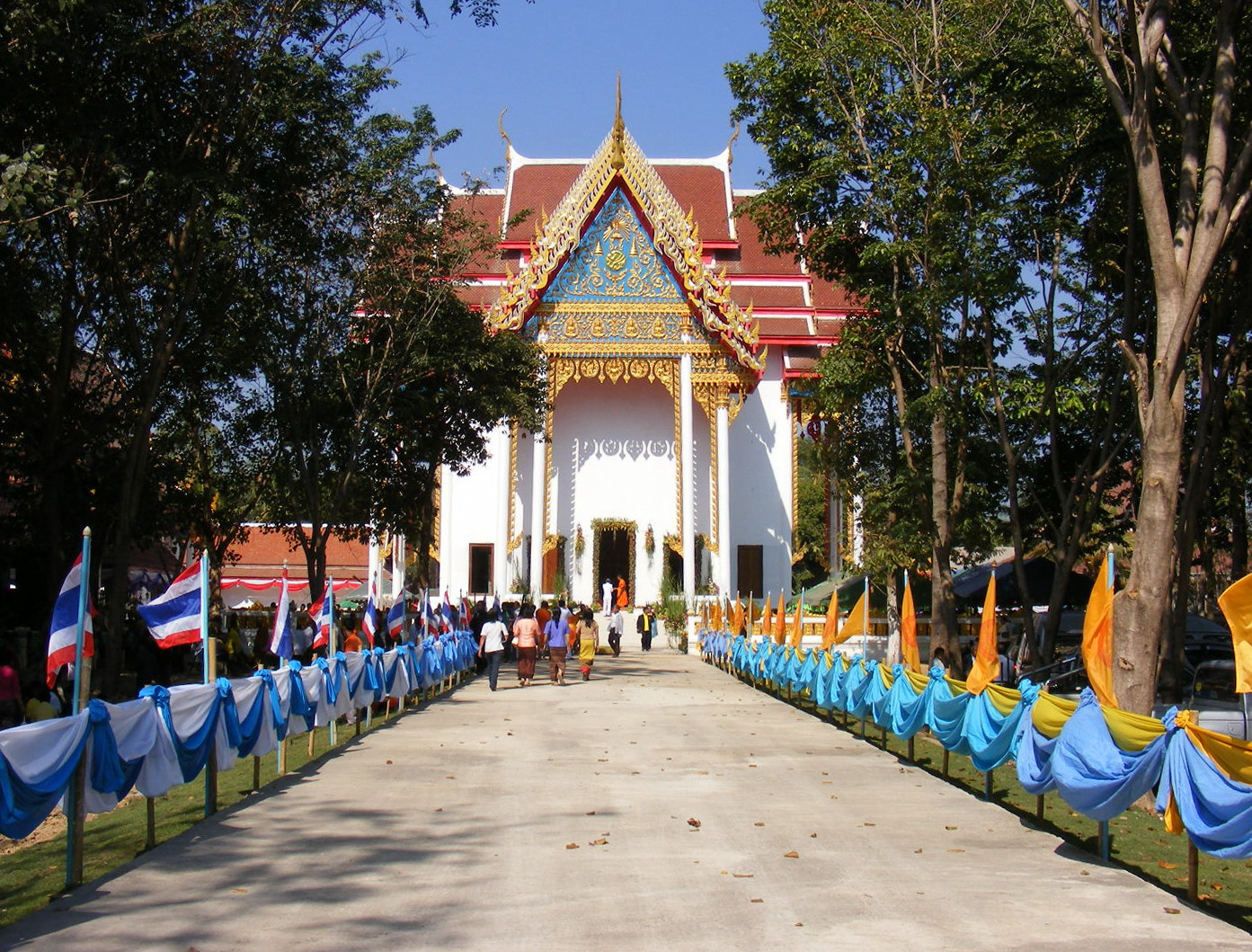
Wat Nong Wong

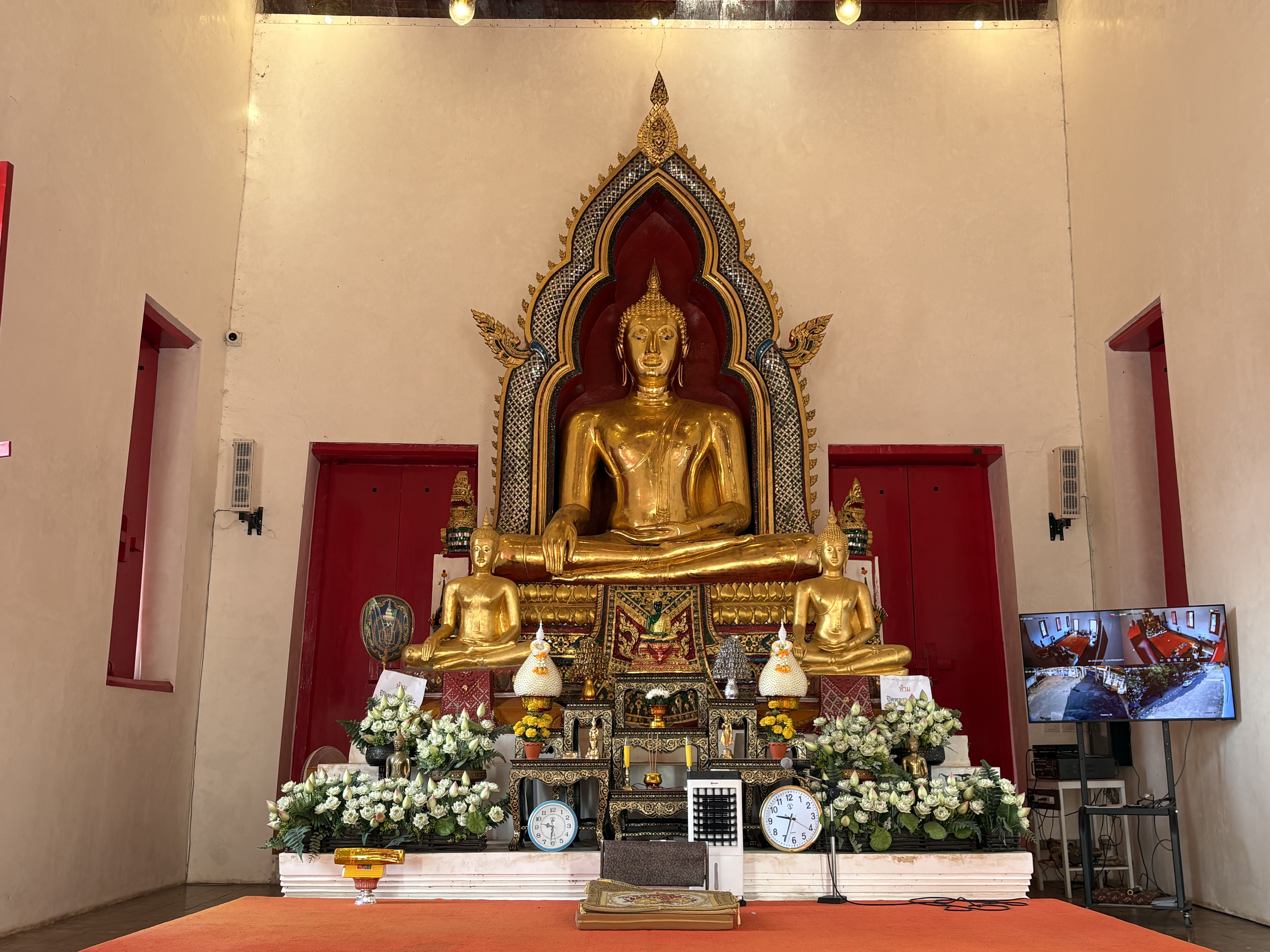
Wat Sawang Arom Worawihan

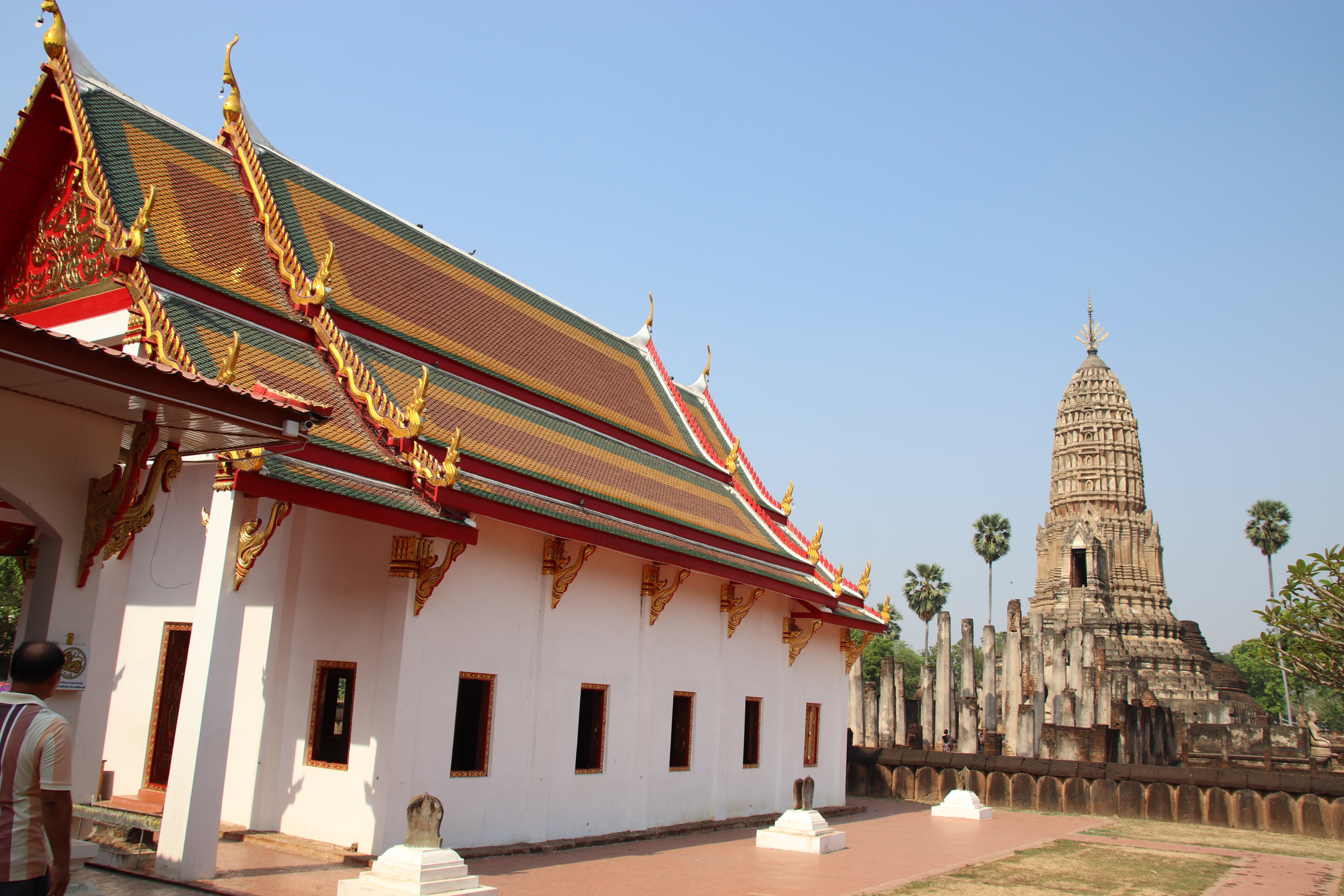
Wat Phra Si Rattana Mahathat

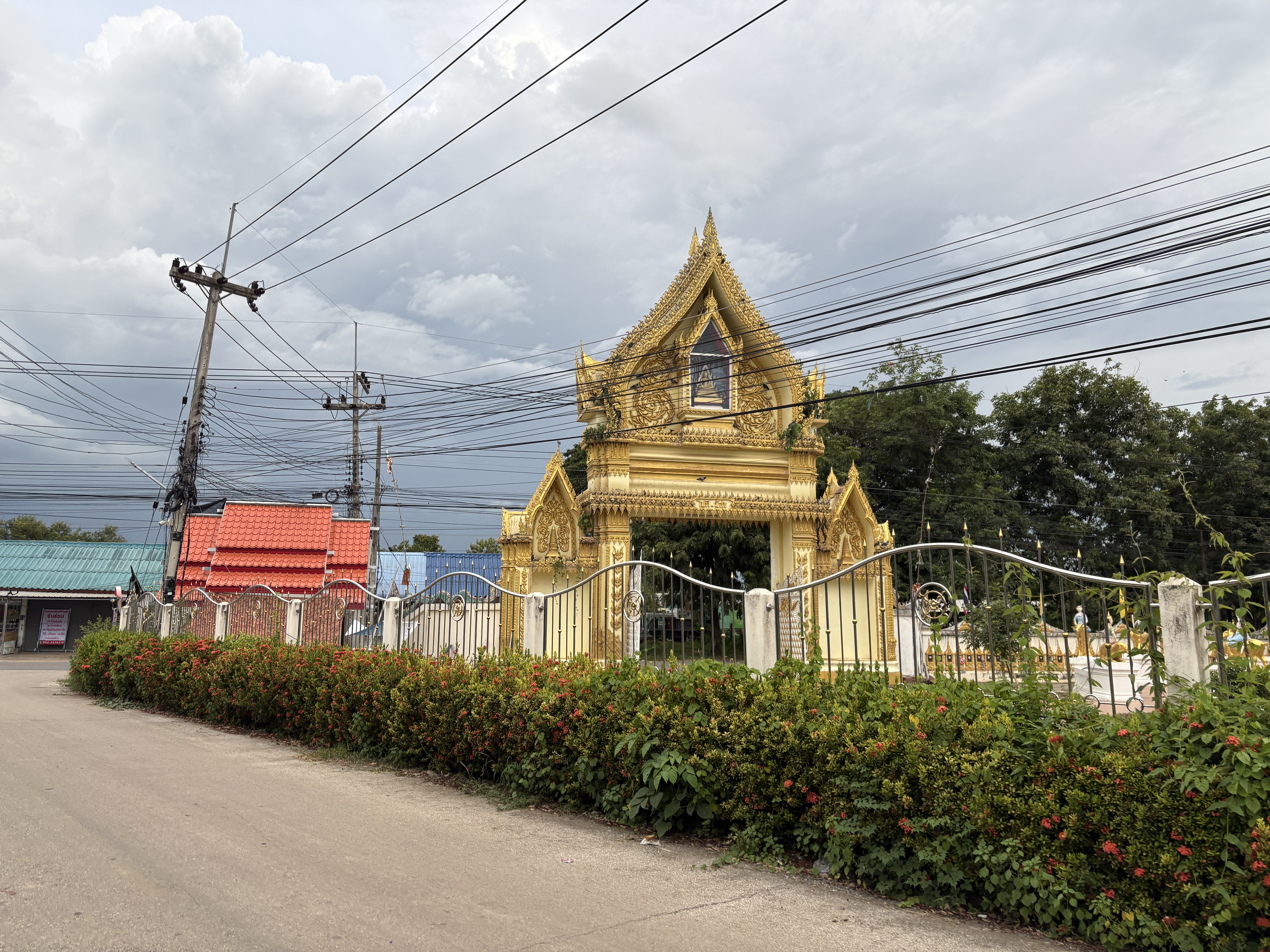
Wat Rat Sattha Tham

The four phra aram luang of Sukhothai

As of 2014, 99.8% of the population practiced Buddhism, followed by Christianity at 0.2%. Sukhothai has a total of 385 registered wat (temples) in 2022, with Si Satchanalai district containing the biggest number at 69 temples. Four temples held royal status (phra aram luang) as of 2014. They are Wat Nong Wong, Wat Sawang Arom Worawihan in Sawankhalok district, Wat Phra Si Rattana Mahathat in Si Satchanalai district, and Wat Rat Sattha Tham in Si Nakhon district.

Islam is a minority religion in Sukhothai. As-habul Jannah Mosque in Si Samrong district is the first mosque in Sukhothai province, opened in 2012.

Phra Mae Ya (พระแม่ย่า) or Mae Ya (แม่ย่า) is a local Tai-folk female deity worshipped by the people of Sukhothai province. Her idol was originally discovered at a cave in Khiri Mat district, and was since moved to its present-day shrine in Sukhothai Thani. The deity is regarded as "the greatest spirit of all spirits" in Sukhothai and has been worshipped since the Sukhothai Kingdom era, being considered the province's guardian deity. She was assumed to be the spirit of Nang Sueang, the mother of King Ram Khamhaeng.

=== Languages ===
Sukhothai dialect is a dialect of Thai. The language has been spoken since the formation of the Sukhothai Kingdom, some 700 years ago. It is distinct from central (Bangkok) Thai in both tone and vocabulary and is thought to be similar to proto-Tai in tone structure, an ancestor to the modern Thai language. Sukhothai dialect shares its phonology with standard Thai, except for its tonal system. Sukhothai has the low tone and rising tone swapped. A 2023 study of the dialect in popular song reports Wattanachai Manying's survey of its vocabulary in Kong Krailat district, which found 266 dialect words still in use, a figure it gives as 50.86 percent. The same study reproduces a popular account that sets an older accent at Ban Kluai and Ban Kong against a newer one at Sawankhalok. On that account the older speech says ผอ and แหม๋ where the newer says พ่อ and แม่.

Northern Thai language or Kham Mueang is spoken primarily in the western mountainous region of the province, while the northern mountainous region has Kham Mueang spoken interchangeably with Thai. The border between speakers of Thai and Kham Mueang is placed at between Si Samrong district and Thung Saliam district, and in the northern part of Si Satchanalai district. Northeastern Thai or Isan is spoken in some areas of Hat Siao in Si Satchanalai district and Khlong Maphlap in Si Nakhon district.

== Infrastructure ==
=== Transport ===
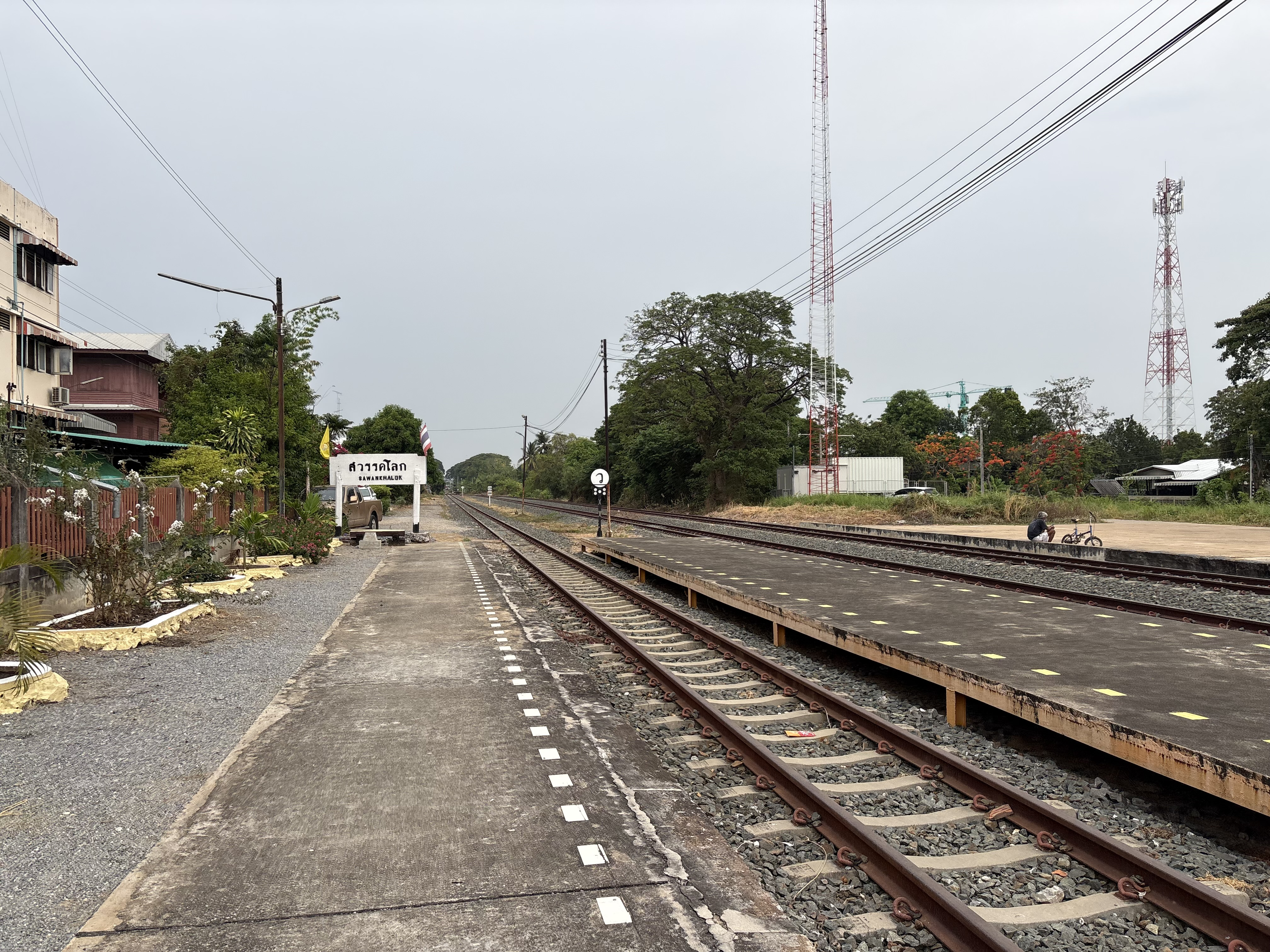
Sawankhalok railway station

There are five highways traversing Sukhothai:

- Highway 12 connects the eastern districts starting at Ban Dan Lan Hoi and passing Muang and Kong Krailat districts to Phitsanulok province.
- Highway 101, starting at Si Satchanalai District, connects the northern districts to the southern districts and passing Sawankhalok, Si Samrong, Muang and Khiri Mat Districts to Kamphaeng Phet province.
- Highway 102 connects Si Satchanalai District to Uttaradit province.
- Highway 1180 connects Sawankhalok District to Si Nakhon District and Uttaradit province.
- Highway 1048 connects Sawankhalok District to Thung Saliam District and Lampang province.

Opened in 1996, Sukhothai Airport in Sawankhalok district serves the province. It is privately owned by Bangkok Airways who maintains the monopoly status operating flights in and out of the airport with Bangkok being its only destination.

Sukhothai province is served by Sawankhalok Line, a branch line splitting from the Chiang Mai Main Line at Ban Dara Junction. The province is home to two stations; Khlong Maphlap (Si Nakhon district), and Sawankhalok (Sawankhalok district), where the line terminates. The line was established in 1909 by the order of King Chulalongkorn in order to connect the city of Sawankhalok to the rail system.

As of 2026, the state enterprise, Transport Company Limited, runs routes from Bangkok to Mueang and Sawankhalok. Win Tour is a local bus company that runs bus routes between more locations in the province to Bangkok, Phitsanulok, and Chiang Mai.

=== Healthcare ===
Sukhothai province has two main general hospitals; Sukhothai Hospital (Mueang district), and Srisangworn Sukhothai Hospital (Si Samrong district) with the latter being the province's first hospital, founded by a Buddhist monk in 1948. The two hospitals serve as referral nodes, responsible for each half of the province's 9 districts. In total, Sukhothai province has 12 hospitals as of 2014. 9 of which are public hospitals; one in each district, and 3 are private. Together more than 1,200 healthcare providers and 900 beds were available.

== Education ==
Sukhothai province has 2,932 educational institutions as of 2025; of which none are universities.

== Human achievement index 2022 ==
Health	Education	Employment	Income
53	49	74	44
Housing	Family	Transport	Participation
32	47	49	21
Province Sukhothai, with an HAI 2022 value of 0.6292 is "somewhat low", occupies place 55 in the ranking.

Since 2003, United Nations Development Programme (UNDP) in Thailand has tracked progress on human development at sub-national level using the Human achievement index (HAI), a composite index covering all the eight key areas of human development. National Economic and Social Development Board (NESDB) has taken over this task since 2017.

Rank	Classification
1 - 13	"high"
14 - 29	"somewhat high"
30 - 45	"average"
46 - 61	"somewhat low"
62 - 77	"low"

Map with provinces and HAI 2022 rankings
