= Mae Ramphan =

Watercourse in Thailand

Mae Ramphan Mae Lamphan, Mae Lampan
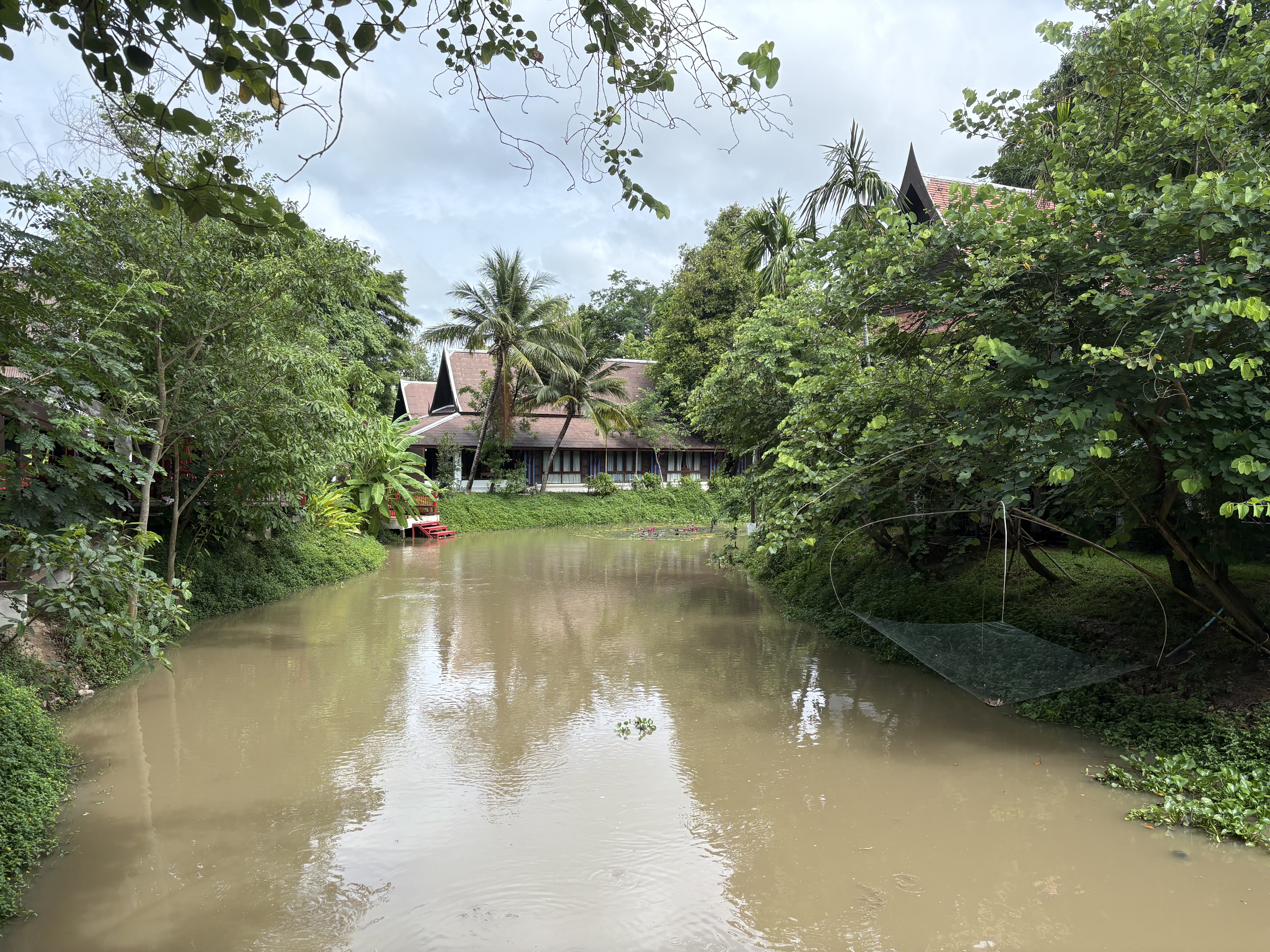
- Mae Lamphan as it flows through a resort in Mueang Sukhothai District, Sukhothai Province

Location
- Country: Thailand
- Provinces: Lampang, Sukhothai
- Districts: Thoeng district, Ban Dan Lan Hoi district, Mueang Sukhothai district

Physical characteristics
- Source
  - location: Thoen District
- Mouth: Yom River
  - location: Mueang Sukhothai district
- Length: 70 km

Basin features
- Landmarks: Sukhothai Historical Park

The Mae Ramphan (Thai: แม่รำพัน, pronounced [mɛ̂ː rām.pʰān]) or Mae Lamphan (Thai: แม่ลำพัน, also transliterated as Mae Lampan) is a river and canal in the provinces of Lampang and Sukhothai in Thailand. It is a tributary of the Yom River, part of the Chao Phraya River basin.

It originates in Thoen District, Lampang Province. It flows through the border with Ban Tak District in Tak Province into Ban Dan Lan Hoi District in Sukhothai Province, and to Mueang Sukhothai District as it passes through the Sukhothai Historical Park. The watercourse joins the Yom River in Mueang Sukhothai District, to the north of Wat Khuha Suwan temple.

The watercourse plays a role in agriculture, especially in the middle section in Ban Dan Lan Hoi. Towards the end of the course, it passes and intersects with various historical courses of Sukhothai Kingdom, including Thanon Phra Ruang and ancient irrigation canals. It is believed to have been a significant canal during the Sukhothai era.
