= Khiri Mat district =

Khiri Mat คีรีมาศ
- District
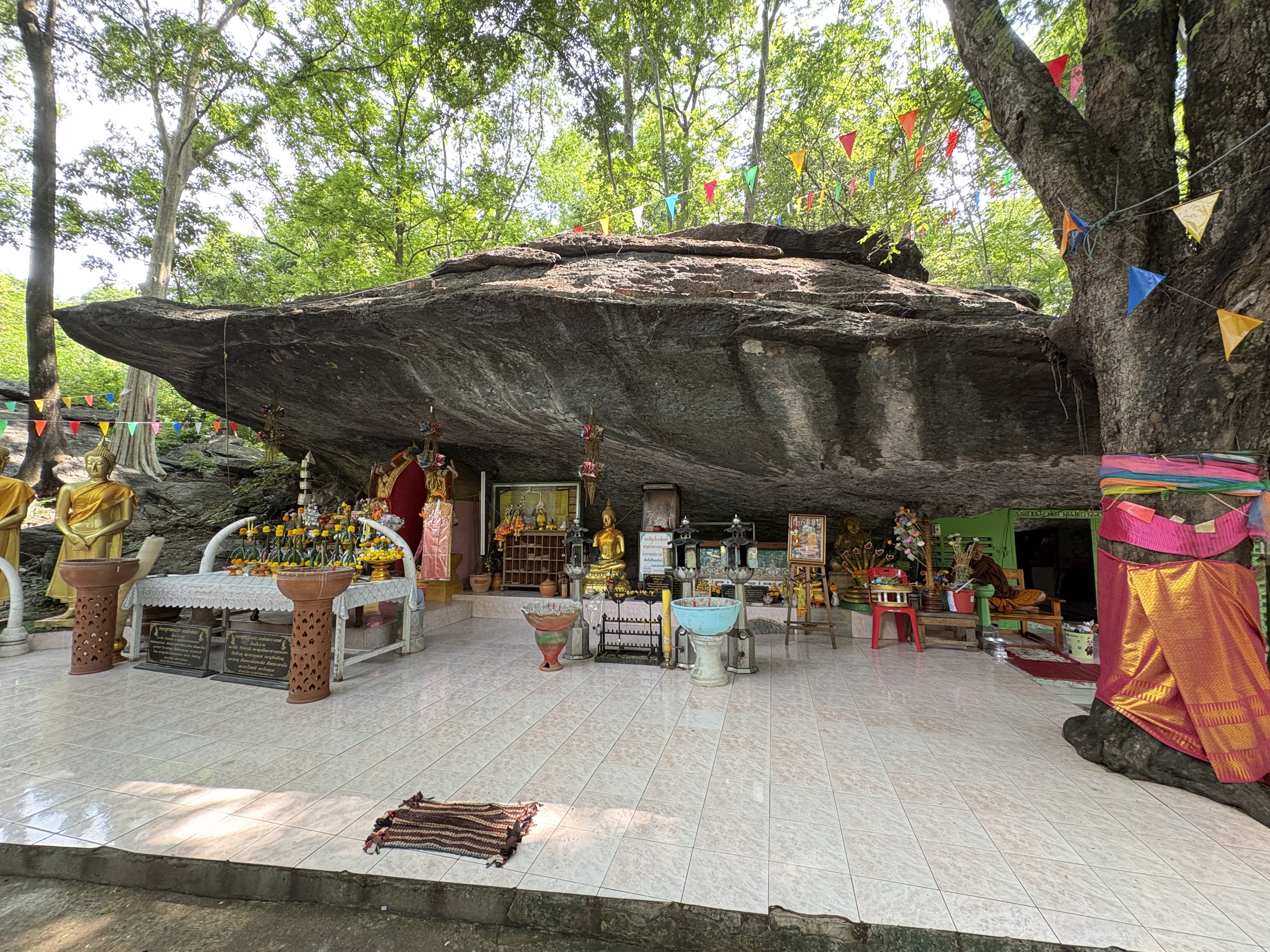
- Phra Mae Ya cave, in Wat Tham Phra Mae Ya

- District location in Sukhothai province
- Coordinates: 16°50′0″N 99°48′6″E
- Country: Thailand
- Province: Sukhothai
- Seat: Tanot

Area
  - Total: 521.9 km^{2} (201.5 sq mi)

Population (2005)
  - Total: 56,585
  - Density: 108.4/km^{2} (281/sq mi)
- Time zone: UTC+7 (ICT)
- Postal code: 64160
- Geocode: 6403

Khiri Mat (Thai: คีรีมาศ, pronounced [kʰīː.rīː mâːt]) is the southernmost district (amphoe) of Sukhothai province, in the lower northern region of Thailand.

== Geography ==
Neighboring districts are (from the northwest clockwise) Ban Dan Lan Hoi, Mueang Sukhothai and Kong Krailat of Sukhothai Province, Bang Rakam of Phitsanulok province and Phran Kratai of Kamphaeng Phet province.

== History ==
The district was renamed from Tanot to Khiri Mat in 1939.

== Administration ==
The district is divided into 10 sub-districts (tambons), which are further subdivided into 101 villages (mubans). There are two townships (thesaban tambons): Tanot covers parts of tambon Tanot, and Thung Luang tambon Thung Luang. There are a further nine tambon administrative organizations (TAO).

No.	Name	Thai name	Villages	Pop.
1.	Tanot	โตนด	17	9,344
2.	Thung Luang	ทุ่งหลวง	13	7,807
3.	Ban Pom	บ้านป้อม	9	4,917
4.	Sam Phuang	สามพวง	10	5,105
5.	Si Khiri Mat	ศรีคีรีมาศ	11	5,203
6.	Nong Chik	หนองจิก	12	7,946
7.	Na Choeng Khiri	นาเชิงคีรี	10	5,776
8.	Nong Krading	หนองกระดิ่ง	6	3,418
9.	Ban Nam Phu	บ้านน้ำพุ	8	5,017
10.	Thung Yang Mueang	ทุ่งยางเมือง	5	2,052
