= Si Nakhon district =

Si Nakhon ศรีนคร
- District
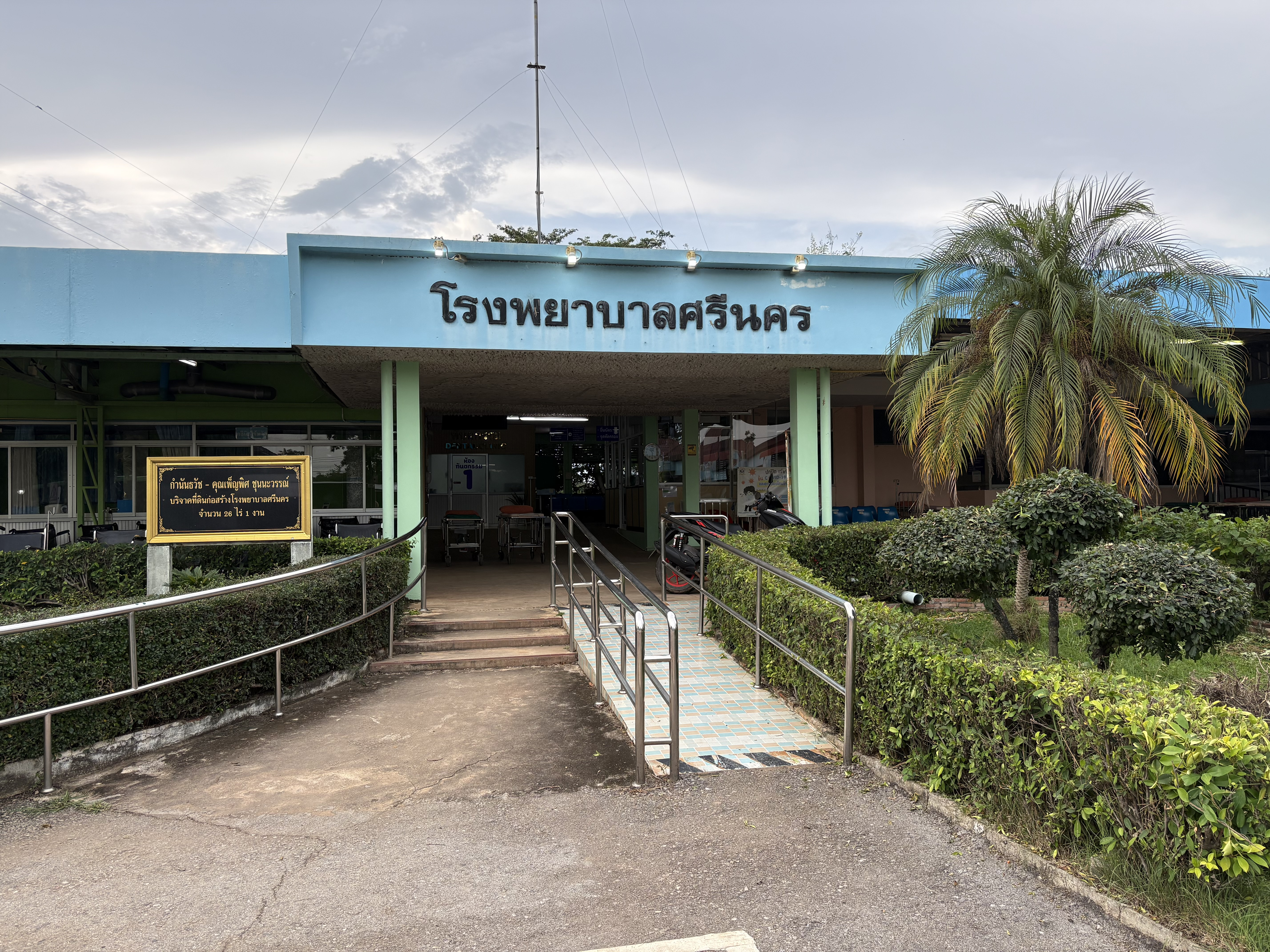
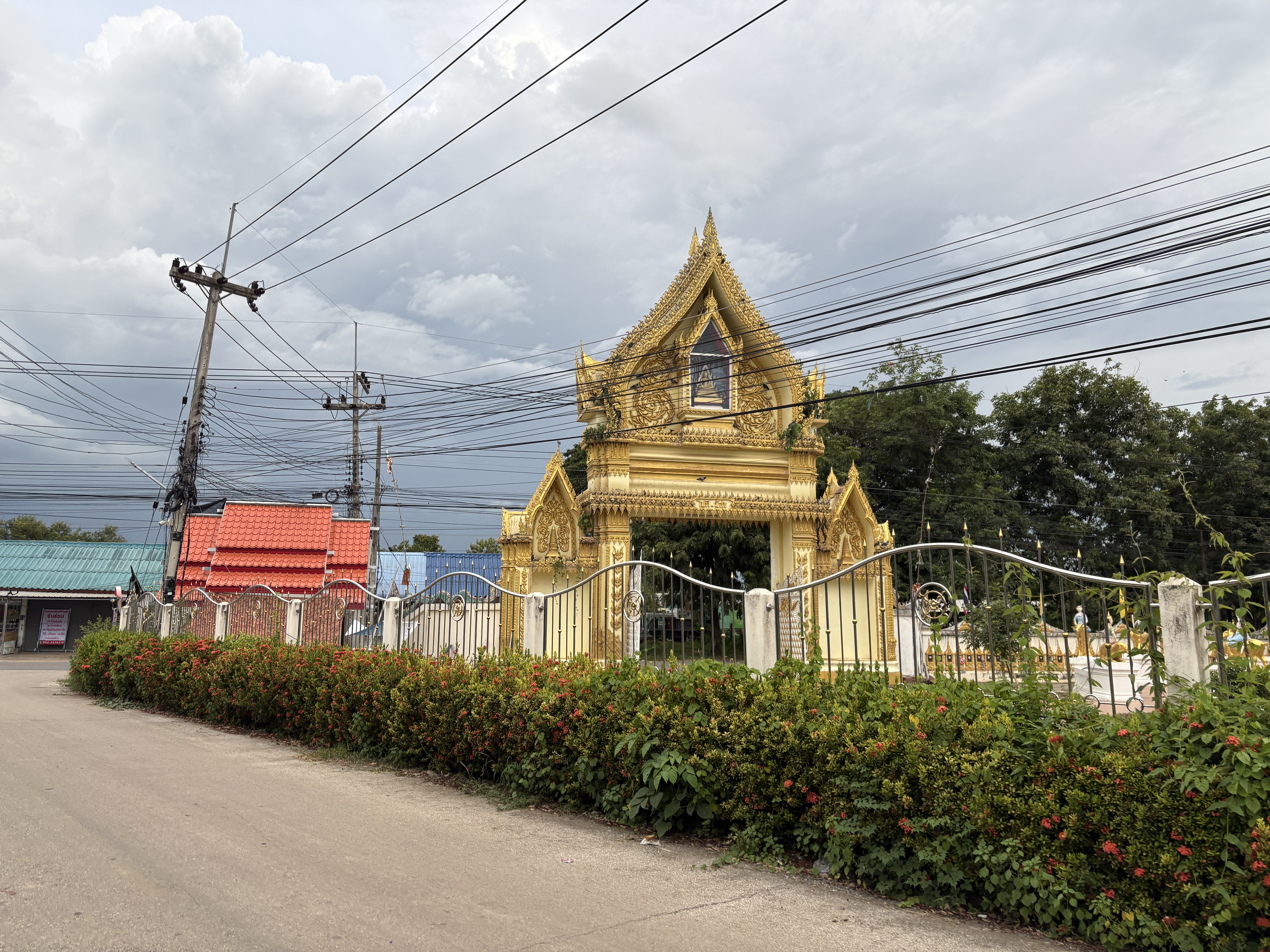
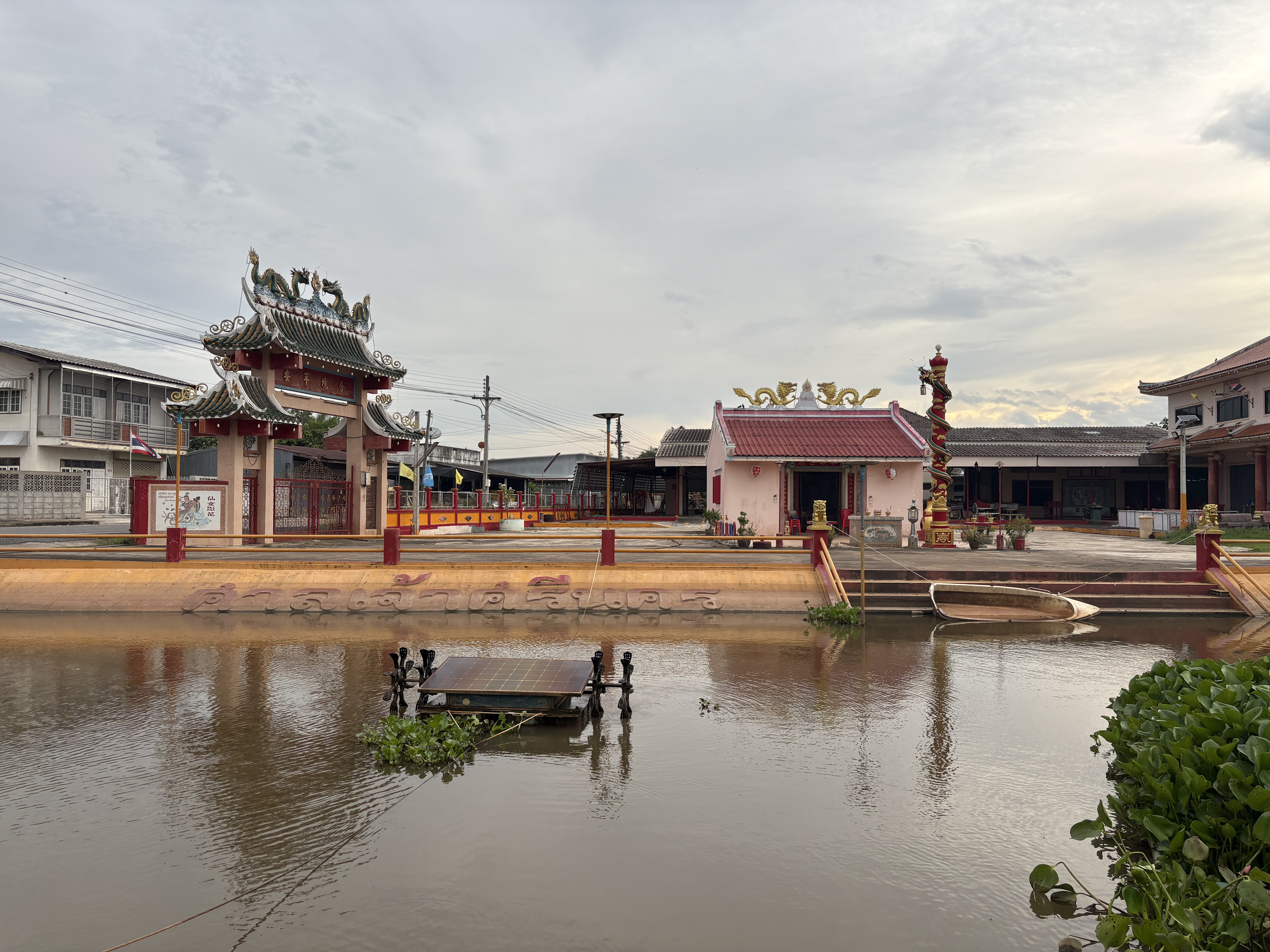
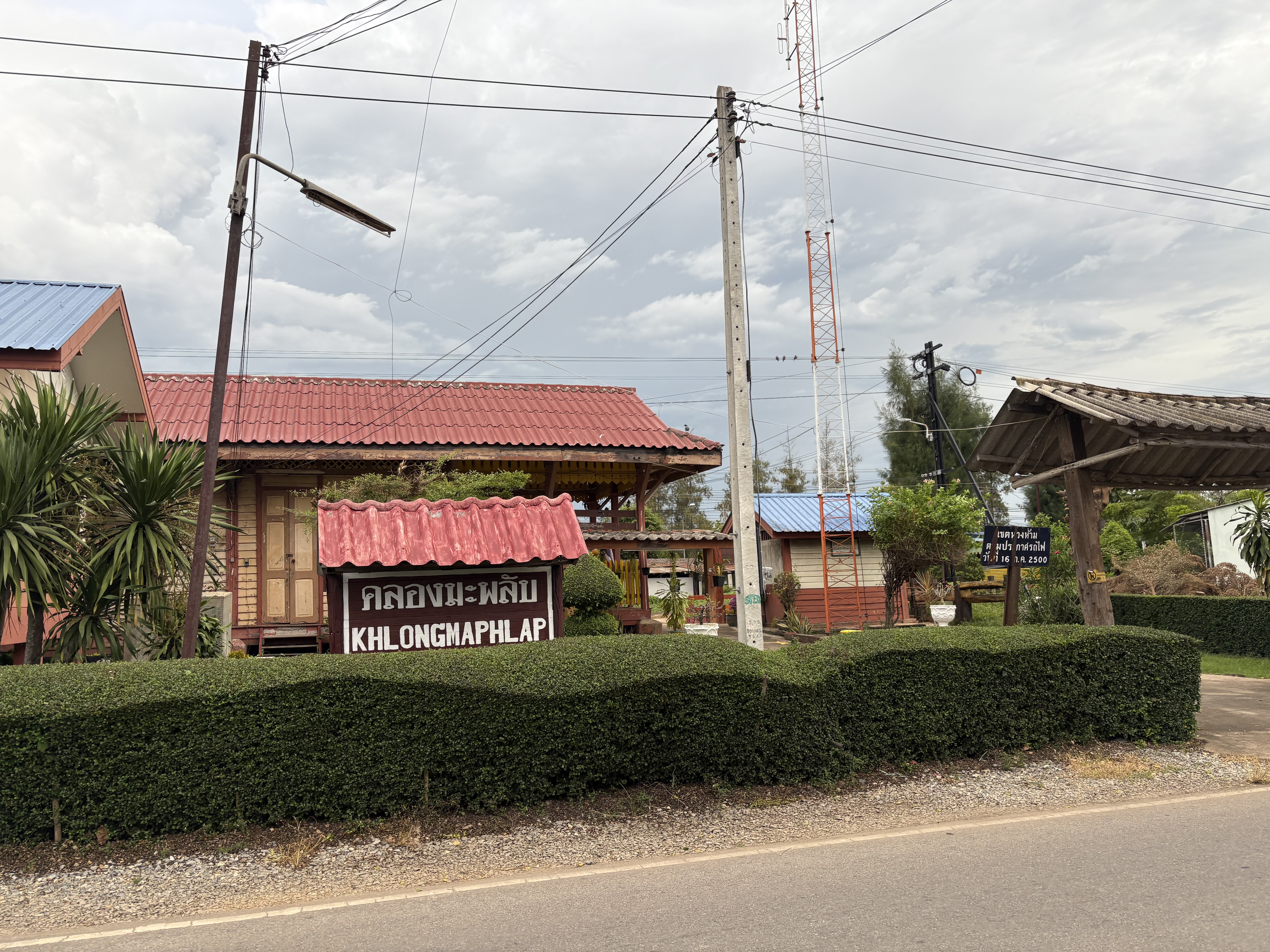
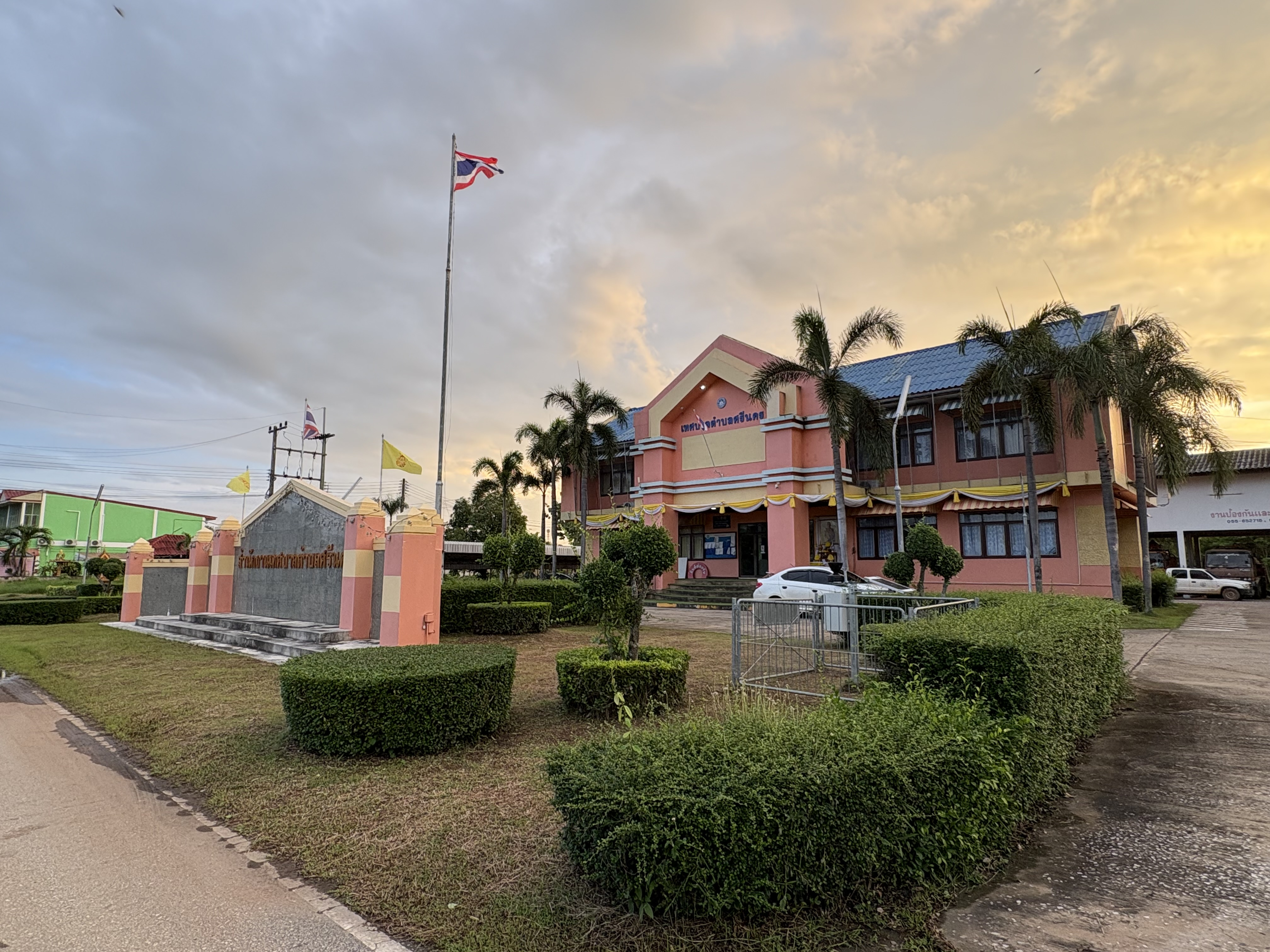
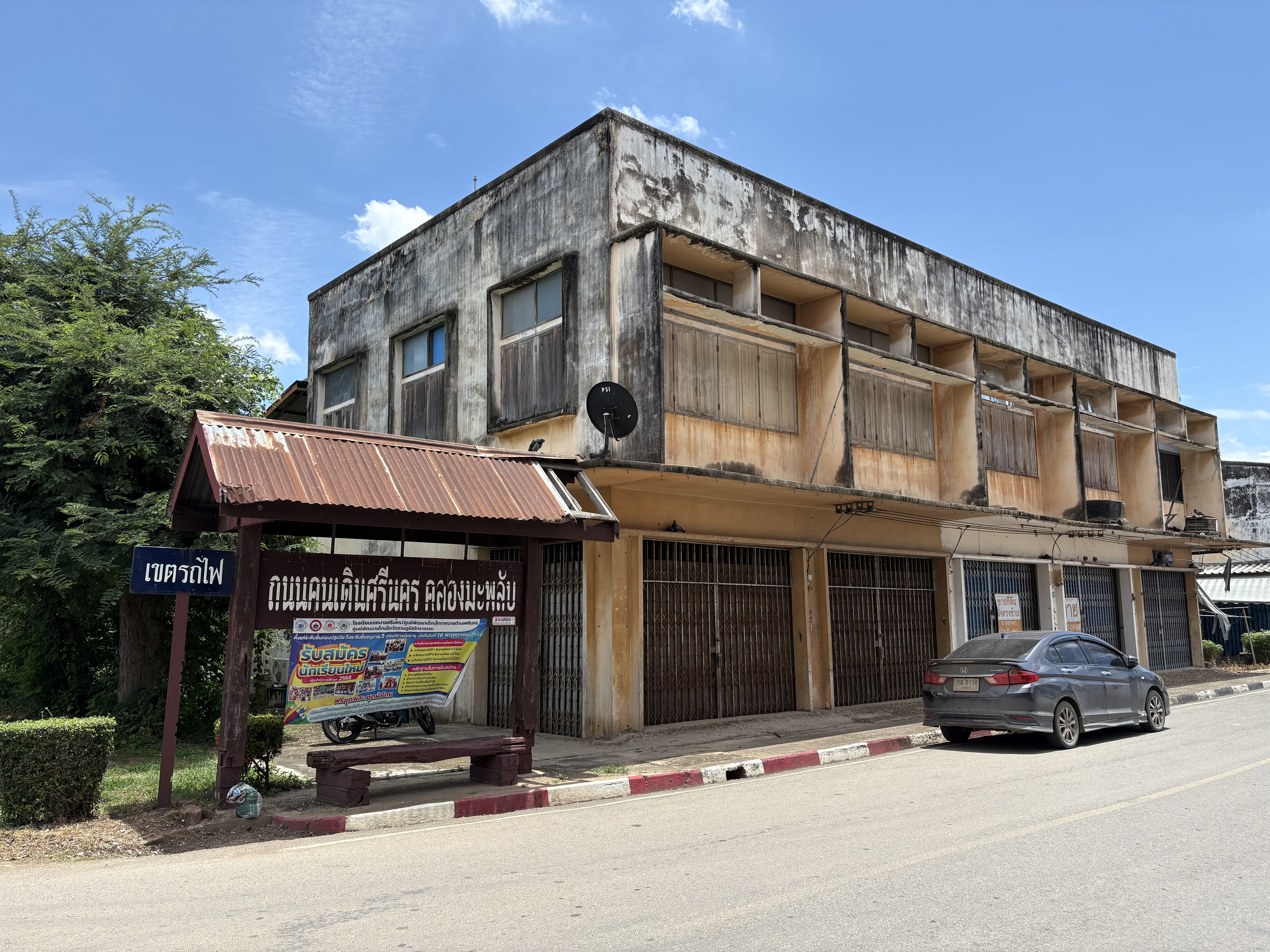
- Si Nakhon Hospital Wat Rat Sattha Tham Pun Tao Kong Shrine Khlong Maphlap railway station Si Nakhon Municipality Administration Si Nakhon Walking Street

- District location in Sukhothai province
- Coordinates: 17°20′53″N 99°59′27″E
- Country: Thailand
- Province: Sukhothai
- Seat: Si Nakhon

Area
  - Total: 199.865 km^{2} (77.168 sq mi)

Population (2005)
  - Total: 27,374
  - Density: 88.3/km^{2} (229/sq mi)
- Time zone: UTC+7 (ICT)
- Postal code: 64180
- Geocode: 6408

Si Nakhon (Thai: ศรีนคร, pronounced [sǐː ná(ʔ).kʰɔ̄ːn]) is a district (amphoe) of Sukhothai province, in the lower northern region of Thailand. It may also be spelled Sri Nakhon. The Thai name comes from Sanskrit language sri (an honorific prefix; rendered si in Thai) and nagar (city; rendered nakhon in Thai), making the name a cognate with Srinagar in India.

== Geography ==
Neighboring districts are (from the south clockwise): Sawankhalok and Si Satchanalai of Sukhothai Province, and Tron and Phichai of Uttaradit province.

== History ==
The minor district (king amphoe) Si Nakhon was established on 20 January 1976, then consisting of the two tambons: Si Sakhon and Nakhon Doet of Sawankhalok district. It was upgraded to a full district on 13 July 1981.

== Administration ==
The district is divided into five sub-districts (tambons), which are further subdivided into 49 villages (mubans). The township (thesaban tambon) Si Nakhon covers parts of tambon Si Nakhon. There are a further five tambon administrative organizations (TAO).

No.	Name	Thai name	Villages	Pop.
1.	Si Nakhon	ศรีนคร	10	6,759
2.	Nakhon Doet	นครเดิฐ	11	5,637
3.	Nam Khum	น้ำขุม	10	5,674
4.	Khlong Maphlap	คลองมะพลับ	10	6,317
5.	Nong Bua	หนองบัว	8	2,987
