= Kong Krailat district =

Kong Krailat กงไกรลาศ
- District
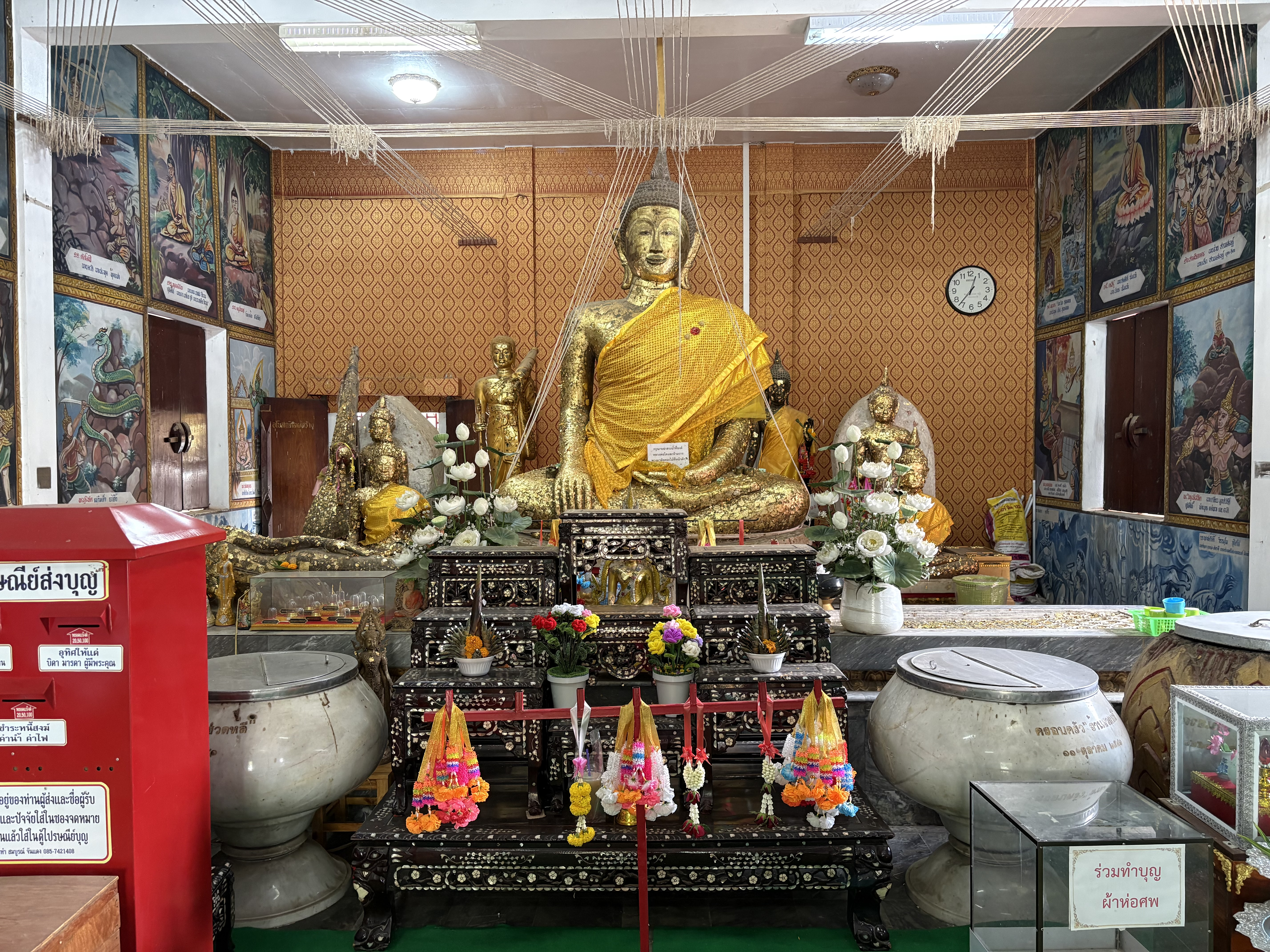
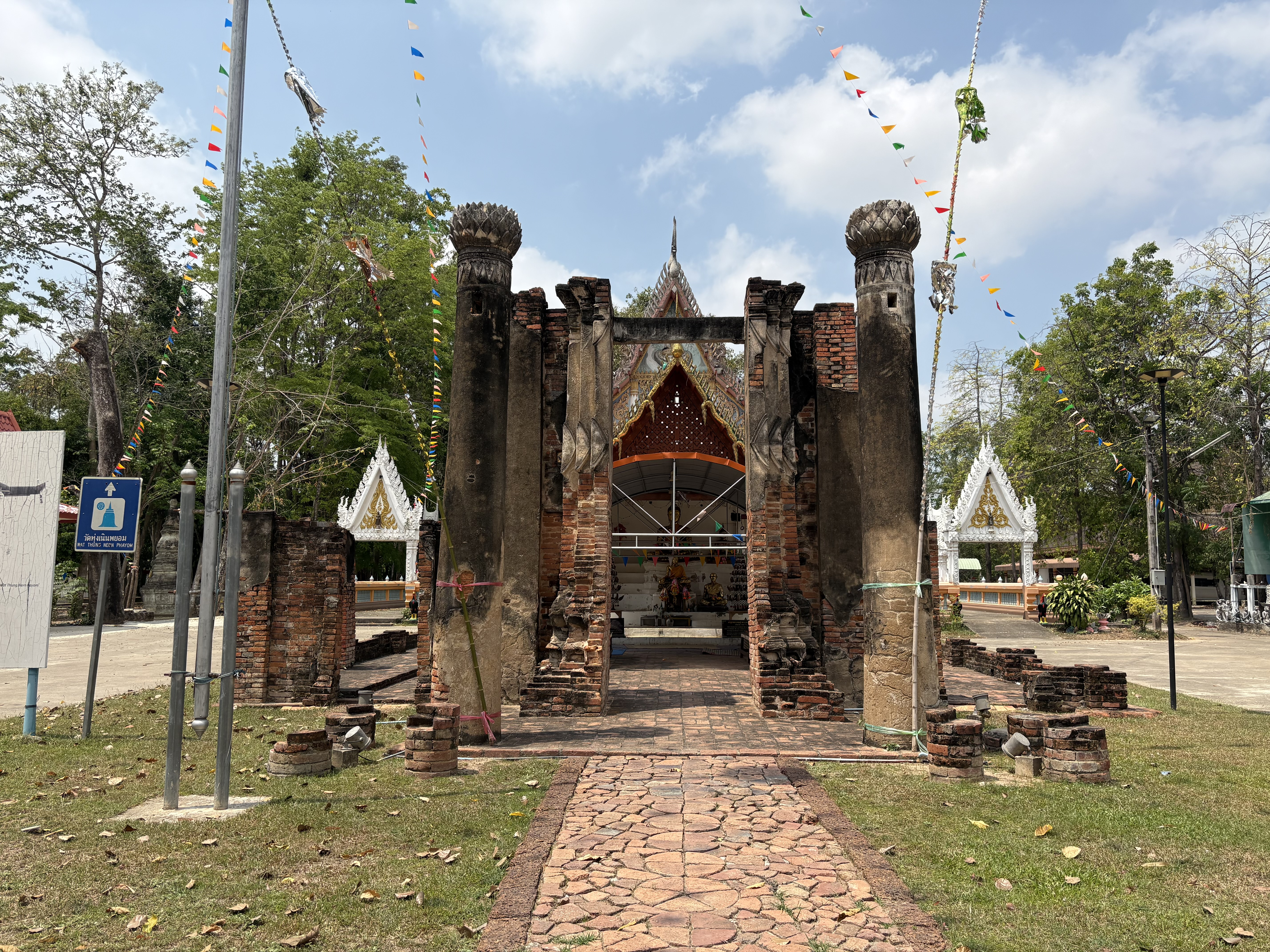
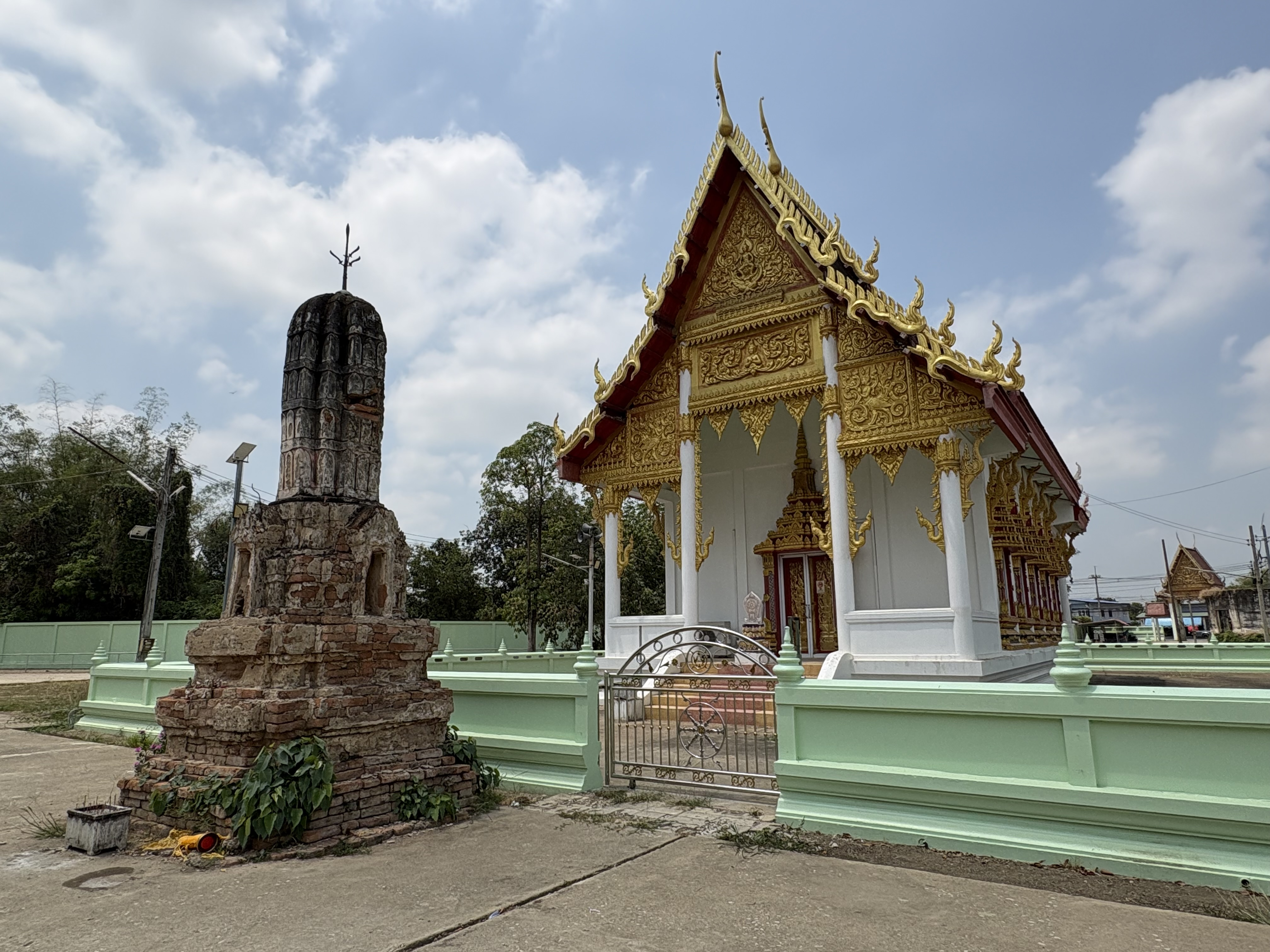
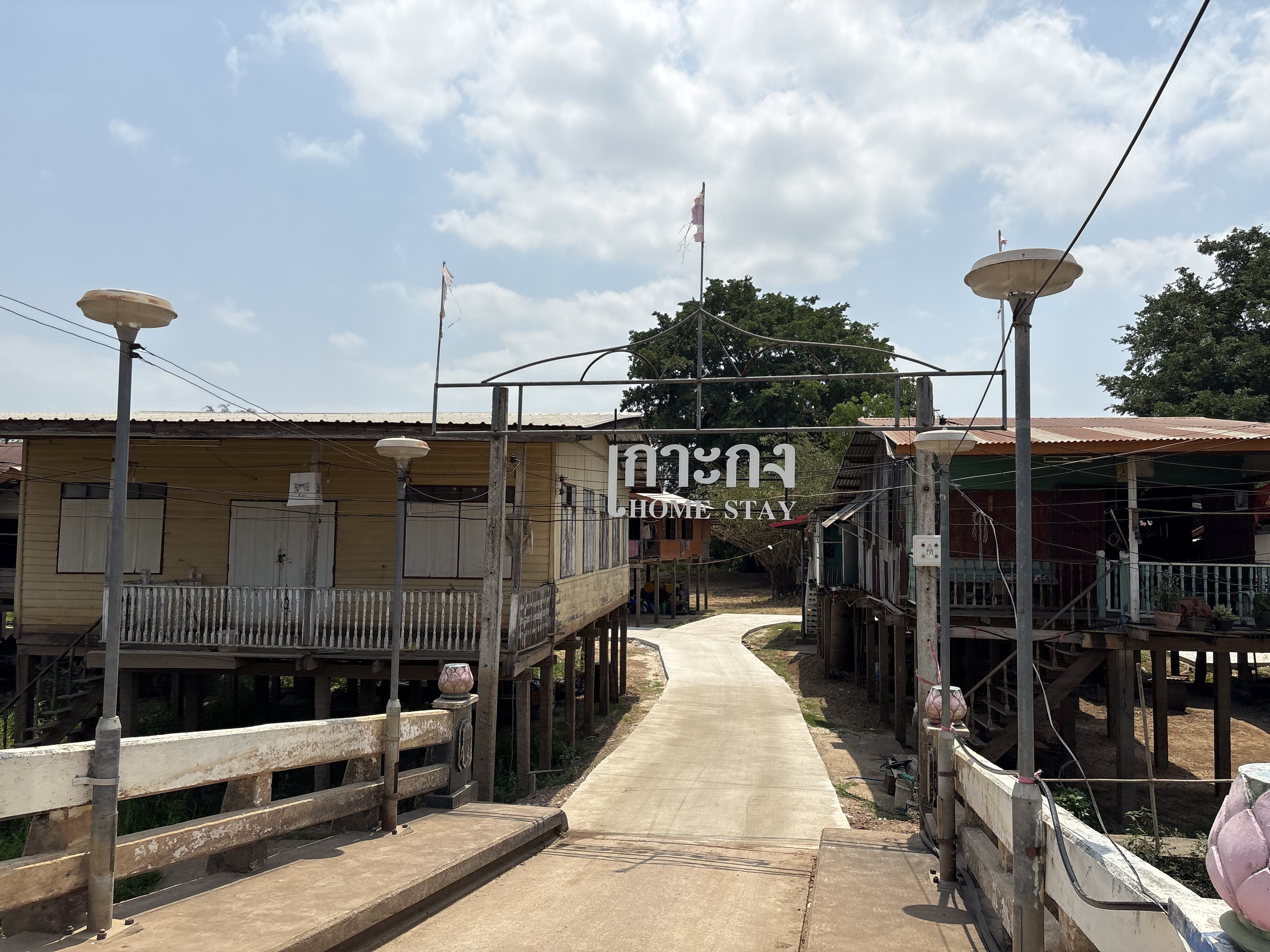
- Luang Pho To Wihan Loi at Wat Kong Krailat Wat Thung Noen Phayom Wat Ban Krang Kong Island

- District location in Sukhothai province
- Coordinates: 16°57′9″N 99°58′34″E
- Country: Thailand
- Province: Sukhothai
- Seat: Ban Krang

Area
  - Total: 502.382 km^{2} (193.971 sq mi)

Population (2005)
  - Total: 64,521
  - Density: 128.4/km^{2} (333/sq mi)
- Time zone: UTC+7 (ICT)
- Postal code: 64170
- Geocode: 6404

Kong Krailat (Thai: กงไกรลาศ, pronounced [kōŋ krāj.lâːt]) is a district (amphoe) in the southeastern part of Sukhothai province, in the lower northern region of Thailand.

== Geography ==
Neighboring districts are (from the southwest clockwise): Khiri Mat and Mueang Sukhothai of Sukhothai province, Phrom Phiram and Bang Rakam of Phitsanulok province.

== History ==
The district was renamed from Ban Krai to Kong Krailat in 1939.

== Language ==
Speakers in the district were the informants for a survey of Sukhothai dialect vocabulary by Wattanachai Manying, reported in a 2023 study of the dialect in popular song. The survey recorded 266 dialect words still in use, a figure it gives as 50.86 percent, and describes them as both archaic terms and terms formed within the speech community.

== Administration ==
The district is divided into 11 sub-districts (tambons), which are further subdivided into 126 villages (mubans). The township (thesaban tambon) Kong Krailat covers parts of tambons Kong, Ban Krang and Pa Faek. There are a further 10 tambon administrative organizations (TAO).

No.	Name	Thai name	Villages	Pop.
1.	Kong	กง	13	5,947
2.	Ban Krang	บ้านกร่าง	12	4,175
3.	Krai Nok	ไกรนอก	15	4,501
4.	Krai Klang	ไกรกลาง	8	3,924
5.	Krai Nai	ไกรใน	15	7,973
6.	Dong Dueai	ดงเดือย	11	6,478
7.	Pa Faek	ป่าแฝก	13	6,102
8.	Kok Raet	กกแรต	12	5,252
9.	Tha Chanuan	ท่าฉนวน	12	9,888
10.	Nong Tum	หนองตูม	7	5,400
11.	Ban Mai Suk Kasem	บ้านใหม่สุขเกษม	8	4,881
