= Ban Dan Lan Hoi district =

Ban Dan Lan Hoi บ้านด่านลานหอย
- District
- District location in Sukhothai province
- Coordinates: 17°0′22″N 99°34′29″E
- Country: Thailand
- Province: Sukhothai

Area
  - Total: 1,018.11 km^{2} (393.09 sq mi)

Population (2005)
  - Total: 42,074
  - Density: 41.3/km^{2} (107/sq mi)
- Time zone: UTC+7 (ICT)
- Postal code: 64140
- Geocode: 6402

Ban Dan Lan Hoi (Thai: บ้านด่านลานหอย, pronounced [bâːn dàːn lāːn hɔ̌j]) is a district (amphoe) in the western part of Sukhothai province, in the lower north of Thailand.

== History ==
Archaeological survey in the hills along the western and northern edge of the district has recorded ancient mines and more than a hundred iron-smelting furnaces, at Ban Wang Hat and at Ban Taling Chan. Ore was gathered at the surface and cut from pits more than 10 m deep, and gold, silver and lead have also been reported from the two areas, although iron was the metal chiefly worked. In 2018 the Fine Arts Department excavated a smelting site beside the Kong Khai stream, opening a slag dump and a second pit with at least six circular furnaces. Thermoluminescence on the furnace walls and radiocarbon on charcoal in slag place the work between 1128 and 1280. The ground had been in use since the late Metal Age, when the dead were buried beside the smelting places with iron tools made there.

In the Sukhothai era, the district area was the western camp of patrolling soldiers. The village near the camp was called Ban Lan Khoi (บ้านลานคอย). The pronunciation changed with time to the present-day Ban Lan Hoi.

In the Rattanakosin era, the Interior Ministry created a new sub-district (tambon) named Ban Dan. It was upgraded to a minor district (king amphoe) under Mueang Sukhothai district in 1909. The district office was moved to Tambon Lan Hoi in 1916. When the Charot Withi Thong road, connecting Sukhothai with Tak was finished, they moved the office to Tambon Ban Dan again. In 1939 the district was renamed from Lan Hoi to Ban Dan Lan Hoi. In 1973 the government upgraded the minor district to a full district.

== Geography ==
Neighbouring districts are (from the north clockwise) Thung Saliam, Si Samrong, Mueang Sukhothai, Khiri Mat of Sukhothai Province, Phran Kratai of Kamphaeng Phet province, Mueang Tak, Ban Tak, of Tak Province and Thoen of Lampang province.

== Administration ==
The district is divided into seven sub-districts (tambons), which are further subdivided into 70 villages (mubans). The township (thesaban tambon) Lan Hoi covers parts of the tambon Lan Hoi. There are a further seven tambon administrative organizations (TAO).

No.	Name	Thai name	Villages	Pop.
1.	Lan Hoi	ลานหอย	10	7,559
2.	Ban Dan	บ้านด่าน	14	5,791
3.	Wang Takhro	วังตะคร้อ	9	5,307
4.	Wang Nam Khao	วังน้ำขาว	17	8,934
5.	Taling Chan	ตลิ่งชัน	10	9,337
6.	Nong Ya Plong	หนองหญ้าปล้อง	10	5,146
7.	Wang Luek	วังลึก	8	3,957
