= Wat Phra Si Rattana Mahathat, Si Satchanalai =

Buddhist temple in Thailand

Wat Phra Si Rattana Mahathat Ratchaworawihan
- วัดพระศรีรัตนมหาธาตุราชวรวิหาร
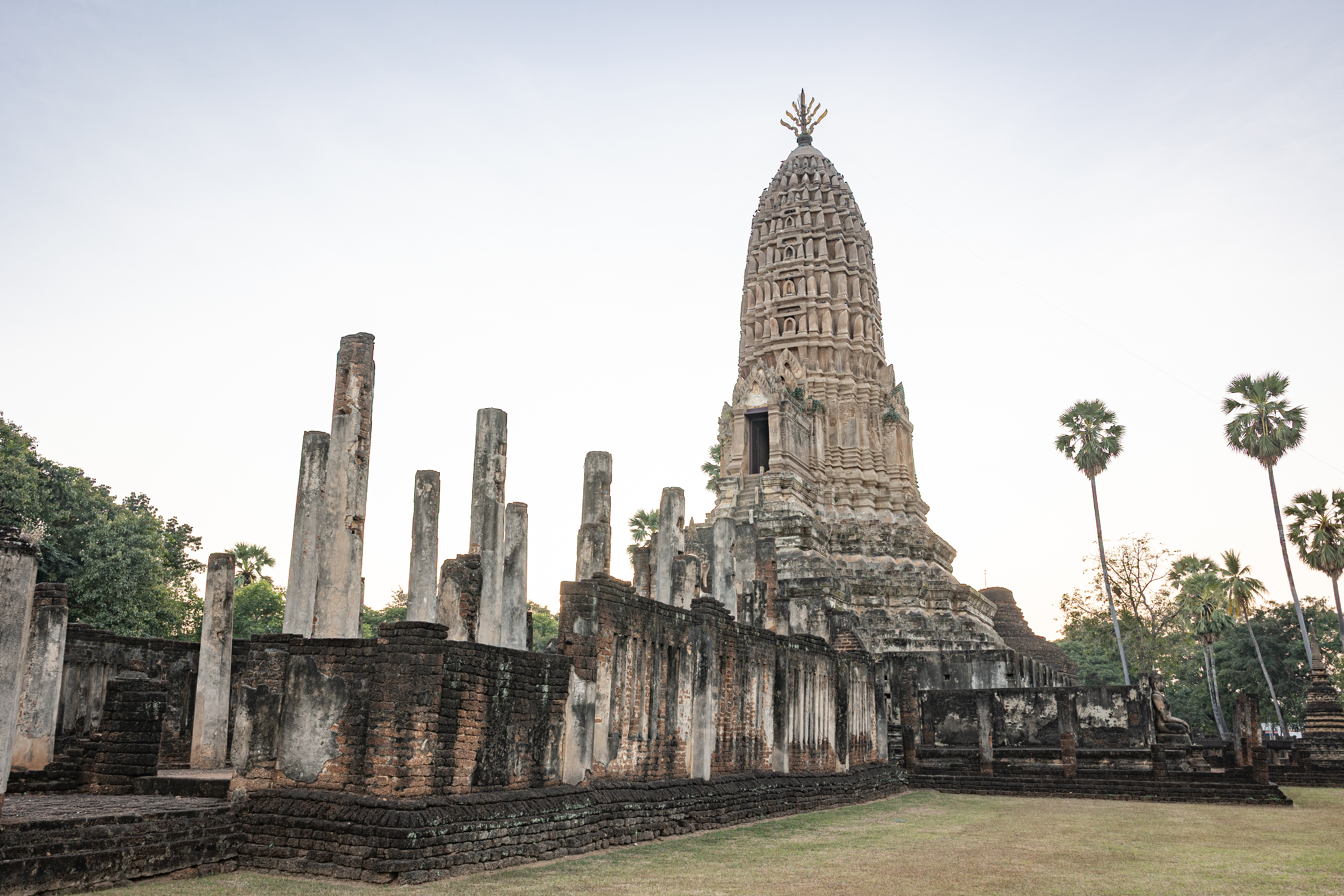
- Prang of Wat Phra Si Rattana Mahathat Chaliang

Religion
- Affiliation: Buddhist
- Sect: Theravāda
- Status: First-class royal temple

Location
- Location: Si Satchanalai, Sukhothai
- Country: Thailand
- Interactive map of Wat Phra Si Rattana Mahathat Ratchaworawihan
- Coordinates: 17°25′45″N 99°48′40″E

Wat Phra Si Rattana Mahathat Ratchaworawihan (Thai: วัดพระศรีรัตนมหาธาตุราชวรวิหาร) is a first-class royal temple in Si Satchanalai, Sukhothai, Thailand. The modern temple buildings are located next to the ruins of an ancient temple complex known as Wat Phra Si Rattana Mahathat Chaliang (Thai: วัดพระศรีรัตนมหาธาตุเชลียง). The area is part of Si Satchanalai Historical Park.
