= Maha Thammaracha =

Maha Thammaracha (Thai: มหาธรรมราชา, pronounced [mā.hǎː tʰām.mā.rāː.t͡ɕʰāː]; Pali: Mahā Dhammarājā; Sanskrit: Mahā Dharmarājā; literally "Great Dharmic King"), or the extended version Maha Thammarachathirat (Thai: มหาธรรมราชาธิราช, IPA: [má.hǎ: tʰam.má.raː.t͡ɕʰaː.tʰí.râ:t]; Pali: Mahā Dhammarājādhirāja; Sanskrit: Mahā Dharmarājādhirāja; "Great Dharmic King of High Kings"), was a Thai exalted title given to the Buddha. The title was also occupied by monarchs of Sukhothai, an ancient kingdom in Thailand, and may refer:

- Maha Thammaracha I (c. 1300–1368), also known as Li Thai
- Maha Thammaracha II (1358–1399)
- Maha Thammaracha III (c. 1380–1419), also known as Sai Lue Thai
- Maha Thammaracha IV (died 1438), also known as Ban Mueang
- Maha Thammaracha (king of Ayutthaya) (1509–1590)

== See also ==
- Buddhist kingship
- Chakravarti (disambiguation)
- Chatrapathy (disambiguation)
- Dharmaraja (disambiguation)
- Devaraja
