= Ayutthaya–Lan Na War (1441–1474) =

Military conflict

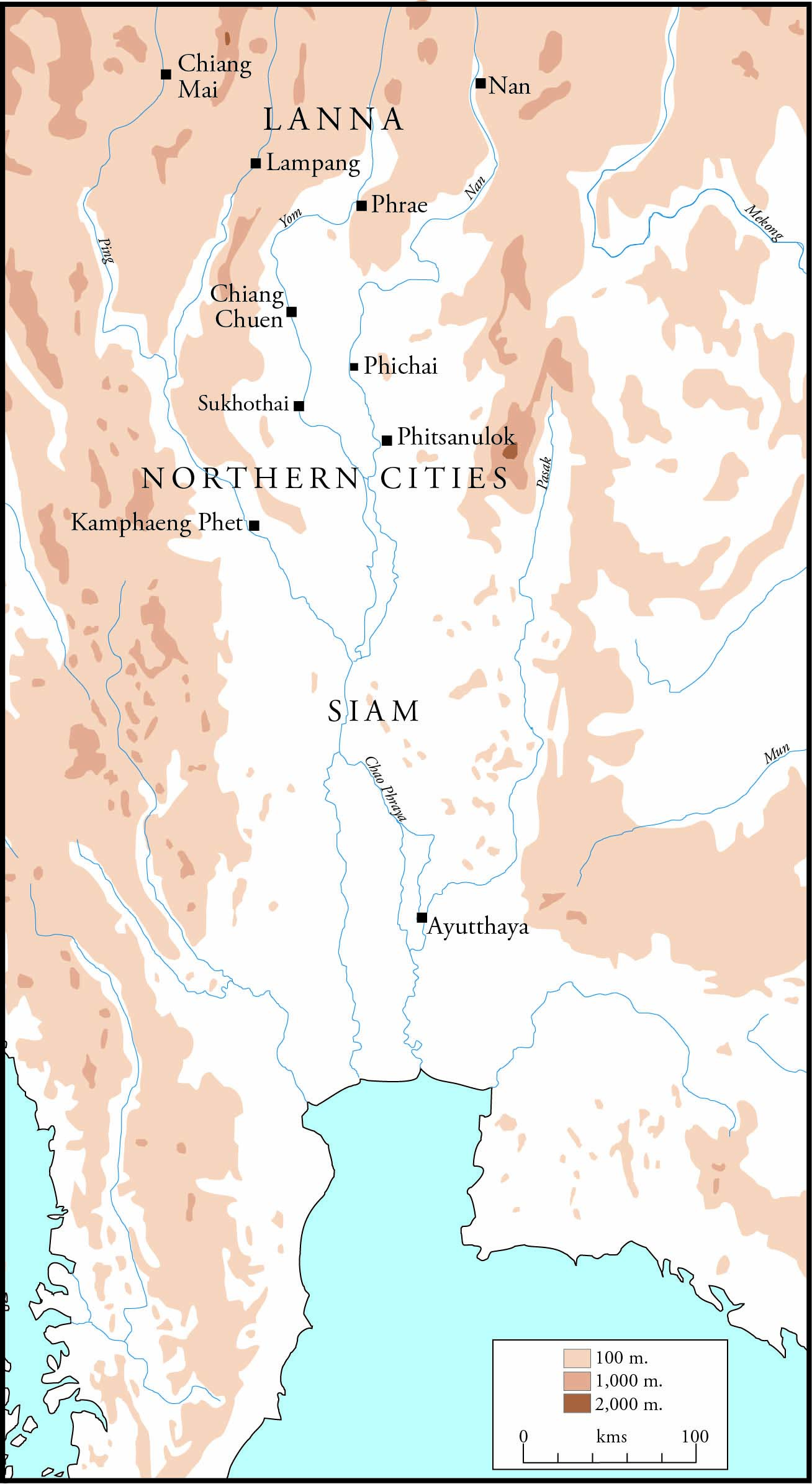
- Places listed in the Thai epic Yuan Phai, chronicling the conflict during c. 1474/75
Date	1441–1474
Location	Northern Ayutthaya, Southern Lan Na
Result	Stalemate: Intharacha Died in the War.

Belligerents
Kingdom of Ayutthaya	Kingdom of Lanna

Commanders and leaders
Borommarachathirat II; Trailokanat; Intharacha †	Tilokaraj; Muen Loknakorn; Muen Harn Nakorn

The Ayutthaya–Lan Na War (1441–1474) was a border conflict between the Ayutthaya Kingdom (present-day Thailand) and the Lan Na Kingdom (in northern Thailand) that started with the Ayutthayan invasion of southern Lan Na and continued with periodic breaks until 1474. Though the conflict resulted in a stalemate, Lan Na achieved limited territorial gains, but was weakened by internal power struggles and losses sustained during the conflict.

== Background ==
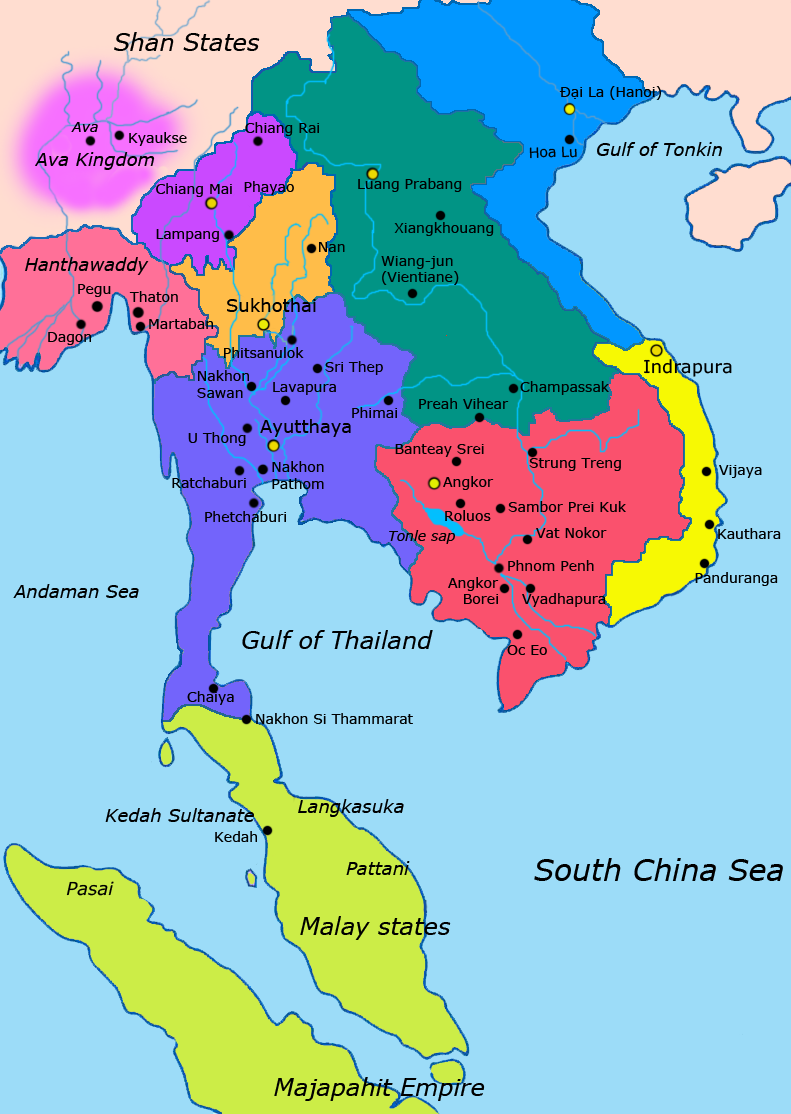
Map of Lan Na and Ayutthaya c. 1400

During the 15th century, the Ayutthaya Kingdom fought frequent wars against the Lan Na Kingdom in the north, the Khmer Empire of Angkor Wat to the east and the Malay States to the south. King Intharacha of Ayutthaya forced the former Kingdom of Sukhothai to recognize his authority in 1410. The king then invaded Lan Na in 1411, seizing Chiang Rai but failing to capture Chiang Mai and Phayao. In the latter battle, the two sides may have used early cannons. In 1424, King Borommarachathirat II ascended the throne of Ayutthaya. After a seven-month siege, he captured Angkor by treachery in 1431. The Khmer retook the city in 1432 and subsequently transferred their capital to Phnom Penh.

Thao Lok, the sixth son of Sam Fang Kaen, ascended to the throne of Lan Na in the aftermath of a coup against his father in 1441. Thao Lok was crowned as King Tilokaraj, later banishing his father to Muong Shan in the Shan states. General Phya Samdekyoki, who had previously played an important role in bringing Tilokaraj to power, created a plot in order to assume power himself; however, the plot was discovered and Samdekyoki was exiled to Chiang Saen.

Political instability continued as Prince Soi, a half-brother of Tilokaraj, revolted against the new king. Soi refused to pay homage to Tilokaraj and brought his father into his palace in Fang. Troops loyal to Tilokaraj seized Fang and pursued Soi into Muong Terng where he was killed in action.

== Conflict ==
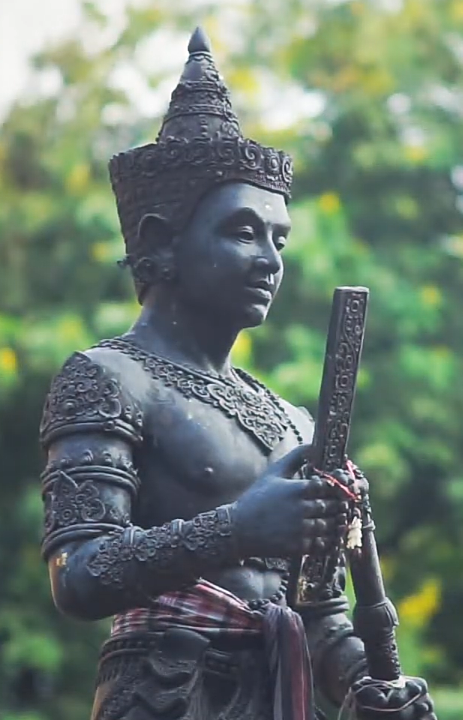
Statue of King Tilokkarat
the ruler of Lan Na.

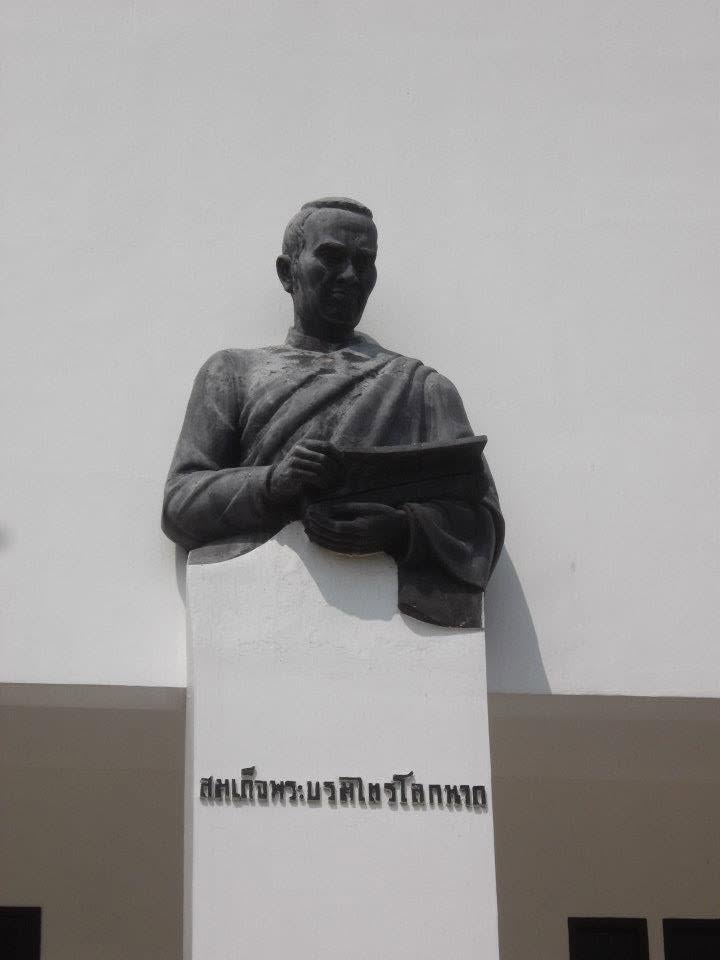
Statue of King Borommatrailokkanat
the ruler of Ayutthaya Kingdom.

After Prince Soi's death, the governor of Muong Terng, who remained loyal to Soi even after his death, secretly wrote a letter to Borommarachathirat II urging him to attack Lan Na. The governor's treachery was uncovered and he was put to death; nevertheless, an Ayutthayan army was already marching towards Chiang Mai from the south.

Tilokaraj appointed Muen Loknakorn as his commander-in-chief and tasked him to stop the invading Ayutthayan army. The Lan Na troops took positions opposite an Ayutthayan encampment and sent out three soldiers to infiltrate the invaders under the cover of darkness. The soldiers untied the Ayutthayan war elephants and cut their tails, sending them into a frenzy; chaos ensued. The Ayutthayans were unable to offer organised resistance to a Lan Na assault on the camp and were forced to retreat. Tilokaraj captured the cities of Phrae and Muong Nan, after successfully employing artillery. Borommarachathirat II failed to capture Chiang Mai in 1442 and was repulsed a second time in 1448.

In 1448, Borommatrailokkanat succeeded Borommarachathirat II as king of Ayutthaya. He soon created the most advanced military administration in Southeast Asia. In 1451, Sawankhalok broke away from Ayutthaya and joined Lan Na, and thus the conflict between the two kingdoms broke out anew. Lan Na forces under Muen Harn Nakorn besieged Chaliang, but a late night counterattack by the defenders repelled the invaders. Ayutthaya captured Chiang Mai in 1452, but was compelled to withdraw after Lan Na received help from the Lao Kingdom of Lan Xang. In 1455, Borommatrailokkanat tried to conquer the Malay state of Malacca, but was defeated.

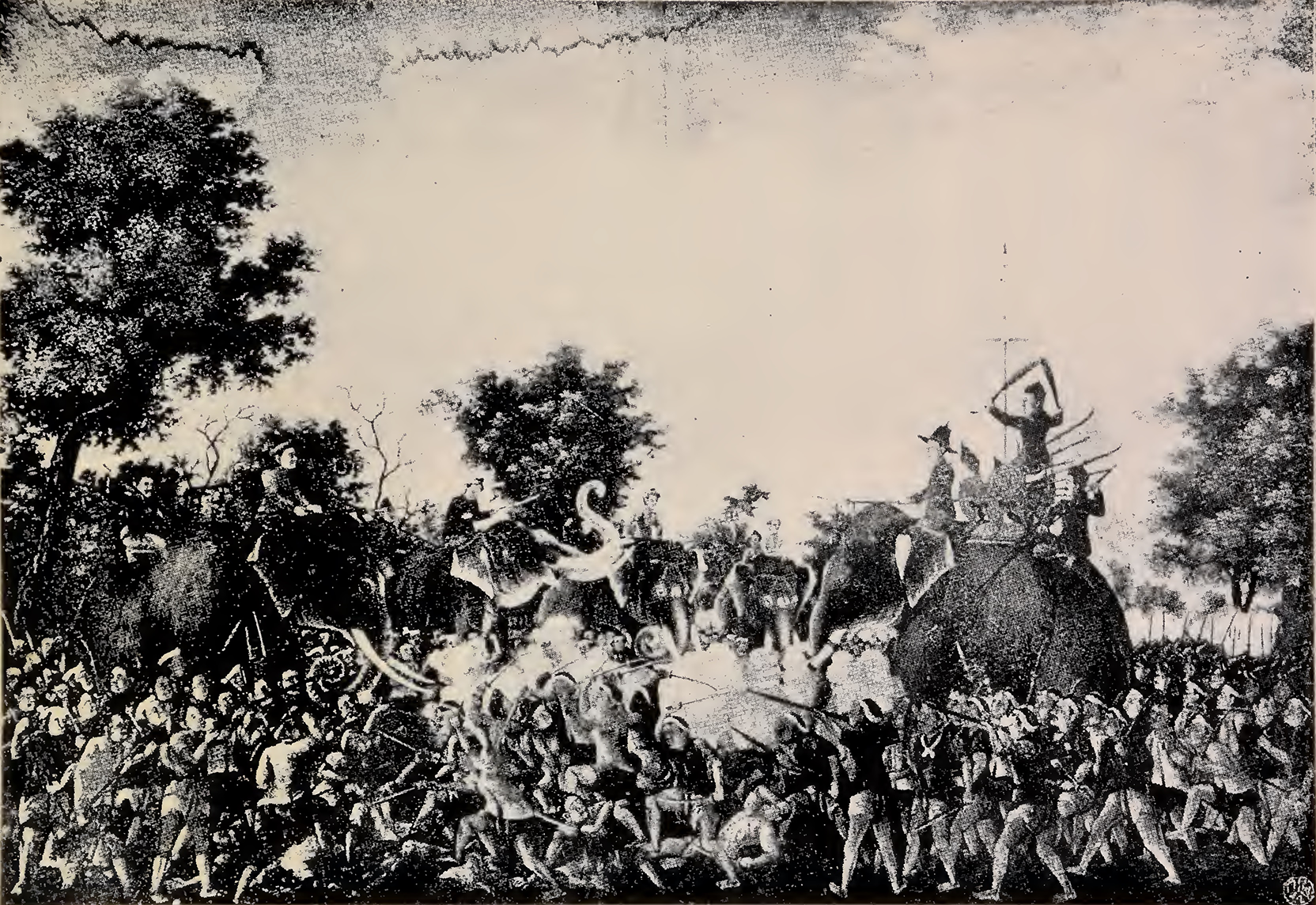
An illustration of Prince Intharacha clashed with Lan Na army on the Doi Ba Hill.

In 1457, hostilities between Lan Na and Ayutthaya resumed. In 1459, Lan Na captured Sawankhalok, which had in the meantime rejoined Ayutthaya. A year later, Ayutthaya reconquered Phrae Province while Lan Na was engaged in conflict with the Shan states. Shortly afterwards, Lan Na unsuccessfully attacked Sawangkaburi. An Ayutthayan army under Prince Intharacha clashed with Lan Na on the Doi Ba Hill on the outskirts of Chiang Mai; both sides suffered heavy casualties, none taking the upper hand. Prince Intharacha died shortly after the battle after being struck by a bullet. Relative peace ensued after Borommatrailokkanat was ordained as a Buddhist monk with the assistance of Lan Na priests.

In 1474, Ayutthaya attacked Chienjuen and killed the governor of the city. Lan Na then retook the city, putting an end to the conflict. Despite limited territorial gains, Lan Na was weakened by a combination of internal power struggles and casualties suffered during the conflict.

== Aftermath ==
The fighting between Ayutthaya and Lan Na resumed between 1494 and 1530. During this period, Lan Na constantly raided their neighbors to their south while Ayutthaya repeatedly mounted invasions in retaliation. Ramathibodi II became king of Ayutthaya in 1491 and ruled until 1529. He instituted compulsory military service to help fight his wars.

In the mid-1500s, the Burmese would become a more formidable threat to the Ayutthaya Kingdom. The Burmese–Siamese War in 1547–49 was inconclusive. A much more dangerous threat developed when Bayinnaung became king of Burma in 1551. Starting in 1563, Bayinnaung conquered both Lan Na and Ayutthaya. The Burmese were not ejected until the Thai revolt of 1587.

== See also ==
- List of rulers of Lan Na
- Sukhothai Kingdom
- History of Thailand
