= Borommatrailokkanat =

King of Ayutthaya from 1448 to 1488

Borommatrailokkanat บรมไตรโลกนาถ
- Statue of King Borommatrailokkanat at the Old Ayothaya town hall

King of Ayutthaya
- Reign: 1448–1488
- Predecessor: Sam Phraya
- Successor: Borommaracha
- Born: 1431; Ayutthaya Kingdom
- Died: 1488 (aged 56–57); Ayutthaya Kingdom
- Issue: Intharacha; Borommaracha III; Ramathibodi II
Names
- Ramesuan Boromma Borommatrailokkanat Bophit
- Dynasty: Suphannaphum
- Father: Borommarachathirat II
- Mother: Sister of Maha Thammaracha III
- Religion: Buddhism

Borommatrailokkanat (Thai: บรมไตรโลกนาถ, pronounced [bɔ̄ː.rōm.mā.trāj.lôːk.kā.nâːt], Sanskrit: Paramatrailōkanātha) or Trailok (1431–1488) was the king of the Ayutthaya Kingdom from 1448 to 1488. He was one of many monarchs who gained the epithet King of White Elephants (Thai: พระเจ้าช้างเผือก, RTGS: Phra Chao Chang Phueak). He was the first Thai king to possess a "noble" or white elephant, which, according to Buddhist belief, was a "glorious and happy sign". His reign was also known for massive reforms of Thai bureaucracy and a successful campaign against the Lan Na Kingdom to the north. He was revered as one of the greatest monarchs of Thailand.

== King of Sukhothai ==
Ramesuan (not to be confused with King Ramesuan r. 1369–1370) was born in 1431 to King Borommarachathirat II or Chao Sam Phraya. Some authors claim that his mother was a princess of the Sukhothai Kingdom, daughter of Sai Lue Thai. According to historian Michael Vickery, however, this is not verifiable in historic sources and may be due to a misreading or misinterpretation of a chronicle.

Be that as it may, Ramesuan was born at a time when the Kingdom of Sukhothai was increasingly tied to Ayutthaya, being under its suzerainty since 1412. When King Maha Thammaracha IV (Borommapan) of Sukhothai died in 1438, Borommaracha II of Ayutthaya annexed Sukhothai and installed his own son, then seven year old Prince Ramesuan, as viceroy (uparaja) of Sukhothai. When Ramesuan was 15 years old, the king sent him to Phitsanulok (which had replaced the city of Sukhothai as capital around 1430) to rule the former territories of Sukhothai which were now known as the "northern cities" (Mueang Nuea) and increase the control of the ruling family over them.

Borommaracha II died in 1448, Prince Ramesuan was then crowned King Borommatrailokkanat of Ayutthaya, making a personal union between Sukhothai and Ayutthaya.

== Reforms ==
=== Bureaucracy ===
Ayutthaya during Borommatrailokkanat's reign

Borommatrailokkanat reformed the Thai bureaucracy—the system lasted well into the 20th century. He separated civil and military officials, giving them titular ranks and feudal ranks to create the hierarchy of nobility, or life-nobles. He also established the mandalas: Inner Cities, Outer Cities, and Tributaries. He also stopped the tradition of appointing royal princes to govern cities, as they had always clashed with each other in times of succession. Borommatrailokkanat promulgated Ayutthayan Law in 1458.

The traditional ministries of Thailand—the Kalahom (predecessor of today's ministry of defence) and the Mahatthai (precursor of the ministry of interior)—were introduced by Borommatrailokkanat. Originally they were meant to serve as simultaneous military and civil Greater Officers of State for the north and south, respectively.

=== Feudal rank ===
Also in his reign in 1454, noble titles were first codified under the hierarchy system called sakdina. Each subject was given a numerical ranking corresponding to the number of rai of land he was entitled to.

=== Royal rank ===
Borommatrailokkanat adopted the position of Uparaja, translated as "Deputy-King", "viceroy" or "underking", usually held by the king's senior son, or full brother, or the sons of their queens, in an attempt to regularize the succession to the throne—a particularly difficult feat for a polygamous dynasty. In practice, there was inherent conflict between king and uparaja and frequent disputed successions. He appointed his eldest son Uparaja of Ayutthaya while he lived in Phitsanulok for twenty-five years, keeping Chiang Mai under control. Eventually, a younger son was made the Uparaja of Phitsanulok, junior to the Uparaja of Ayutthaya.

=== Tributary relationships of Cities ===
In 1468, Borommatrailokkanat adopted a mandala tributary system, and ranked the cities recognizing him as overlord. Phitsanulok and Nakhon Sri Thamarat were listed among the eight great first-rank cities (Phraya maha nakhon). The mueangs Sing, In and Phrom were downgraded to be the level of four cities (เมืองจัตวา) under Lopburi. Governors of first class towns were chao phraya, second class were phraya, third class were phra, fourth class were luang, fifth class were khun, and sixth class were muen.

== Foreign relations ==
In 1455, Borommatrailokkanat sent envoys to the Malacca Sultanate. The Thai had been suspicious of the sultanate since its conversion to Islam. The expedition was mentioned in Portuguese chronicles, written several years later, as not of great significance.

== Wars with Lan Na ==
Yutthitthira, a Sukhothai royal and Boromtrailokkanat’s relative, was the king's close childhood friend. He himself had promised Yuttittira the title of uparaja. However, after Borommatrailokkanat’s reforms, Yuttittira ended up with the title of the Governor of Phichit. Yutthitthira then claimed to be the rightful king of Sukhothai. Chusak Satienpattanodom separates the two defections and the two towns. On his account Phaya Yutthisathian of Phitsanulok went over to Lan Na in 1452, and Phaya Chaliang, who held Sawankhalok, followed in 1460. The Luang Prasert chronicle enters the revolt under CS 822, and has Phaya Chaliang bring the Lan Na ruler against Phitsanulok and Kamphaeng Phet in the following year.

Lan Na under Tilokkarat was so powerful that he led armies down south to subjugate Ayutthaya. In 1456, Yutthitthira sought Tilokkarat’s support and led the Lan Na armies to capture Sukhothai and proceeded further towards Ayutthaya. Borommatrailokkanat, however, led armies to successfully defeat Lan Na.

Tilokarat of mueang Chiang Mai, and Yutthitthira, governor of mueang Sawankhalok led the Lan Na armies to invade Ayutthaya but without achieving fruitful results and retreated. Trailokkanat then took this opportunity to retake Sukhothai. Borommatrailokkanat, upon seeing the seriousness of the wars, made Phitsanulok his base, moving the capital from Ayutthaya.

Borommatrailokkanat, accompanied by more than 2000 followers, was the first Thai king to be ordained as a Buddhist monk. The ordination took place at Wat Chulamani, Phitsanulok, in 1461. Chusak dates it to 1465, and adds that the king sent a monk as envoy to ask for Sawankhalok as alms and was refused.

In 1463, Lan Na invaded again. Borommatrailokkanat sent his son, Prince Intharacha, to crush the invading armies. Indraracha defeated Yutthitthira but was killed during battles against Nagara, Tilokkarat’s uncle. However, Lan Na was plunged by her own internal princely conflicts. In 1474, Borommatrailokkanat finally expelled Lan Na out of Ayutthaya territories. The next year, Tilokarat sought peace settlements. On Chusak's account Sawankhalok itself was recovered in 1474, after the governor Lan Na had set over it was executed and his successor killed by Phaya Luang Sukhothai.

In Phitsanulok, Borommatrailokkanat ordered the establishment of new temples as well as the restoration of existing older ones. He ordered the construction of a cetiya and other buildings at Wat Ratchaburana, Phitsanulok, for example.

== Legacy ==
In 1485, Borommatrailokkanat appointed his son Prince Chaiyachettha (later Ramathibodi II) as the Uparaja and King of Sukhothai. The title "King of Sukhothai" then became a title for Ayutthayan Crown Prince. However, upon Borommatrailokkanat's death in 1488, his two sons inherited the two kingdoms, thus separating the union once again. Fort Borommatrailokkanat (Royal Thai Army Base) in Samo Khae, Phitsanulok Province, is named after Borommatrailokkanat.

Under Borommatrailokkanat, each class had a given amount of land for each of its members. According to one study, “Even the poorest people had some land, so no-one went hungry.”

Borommatrailokkanat House of Suphannaphum Born: 1431 Died: 1488
Regnal titles
Preceded by Borommarachathirat II	King of Ayutthaya; 1448–1488	Succeeded by Borommarachathirat III
New creation Establishment of a new position	Viceroy of Ayutthaya; 1438–1448	Vacant Title next held by Chettathirat
Preceded by Maha Thammaracha IV as vassal king	King of Sukhothai; 1438–1448	Vacant Title next held by Yutthishthian
Preceded by Yutthishthian	Ruler of Phitsanulok; 1474–1488	Succeeded by Chettathirat
