= Dharmaraja =

Dharmaraja refers to several things in Hinduism and Buddhism:

- Dharmaraja, a name of Yama
- Dharmaraja, the Hindu god of justice and the spiritual father of Yudhishthira
- Dharmaraj, a name of Yudhishthira in the Mahabharata
- Dharmaraj, a Kuldevta of Maithils.
- Dharmathakur or Dharmaraja, a Hindu deity of death and justice, a form of Shiva
- Dharmaraja (Buddhism), the title of a Buddha, often mentioned in the Buddhist scriptures
- Dharmaraja or Kalarupa, a wrathful dharmapala and possibly an emanation of Manjusri
- Dharmaraja, the original Sanskrit term for Chogyal, which may refer to a righteous ruler of Sikkim or Bhutan, or a higher-ranking monk in Tibetan Buddhism

Films

- Dharma Raja (film), a 1980 Indian Tamil film directed by M. A. Thirumugam

People

- Dharma Raja, the Maharajah of Travancore from 1758 to 1798
- Dharmarāja Adhvarin, 17th-century Indian philosopher
- Dharmaraj Cheralathan, Indian Kabaddi player
- Dharmaraj Rasalam, Church of South India bishop
- Dharmaraj Ravanan, Indian footballer
- Dharamraj Singh, Indian politician
- Dharmaraju Patsamatla, Indian politician

Places

- Dharmaraja College, in Sri Lanka
- Dharmaraja Ratha, Hindu temple in Tamil Nadu, India

== See also ==
- Maha Thammaracha (disambiguation)
- Thado Dhamma Yaza (disambiguation)
- Dharmarajyam, an essay collection by Vaikom Muhammad Basheer
- Devaraja, deified monarch in medieval Southeast Asia
