= Sukhothai Kingdom =

Post-classical Thai kingdom in north-central Thailand

Sukhothai Kingdom อาณาจักรสุโขทัย (Thai) Anachak Sukhothai
- 1238–1438
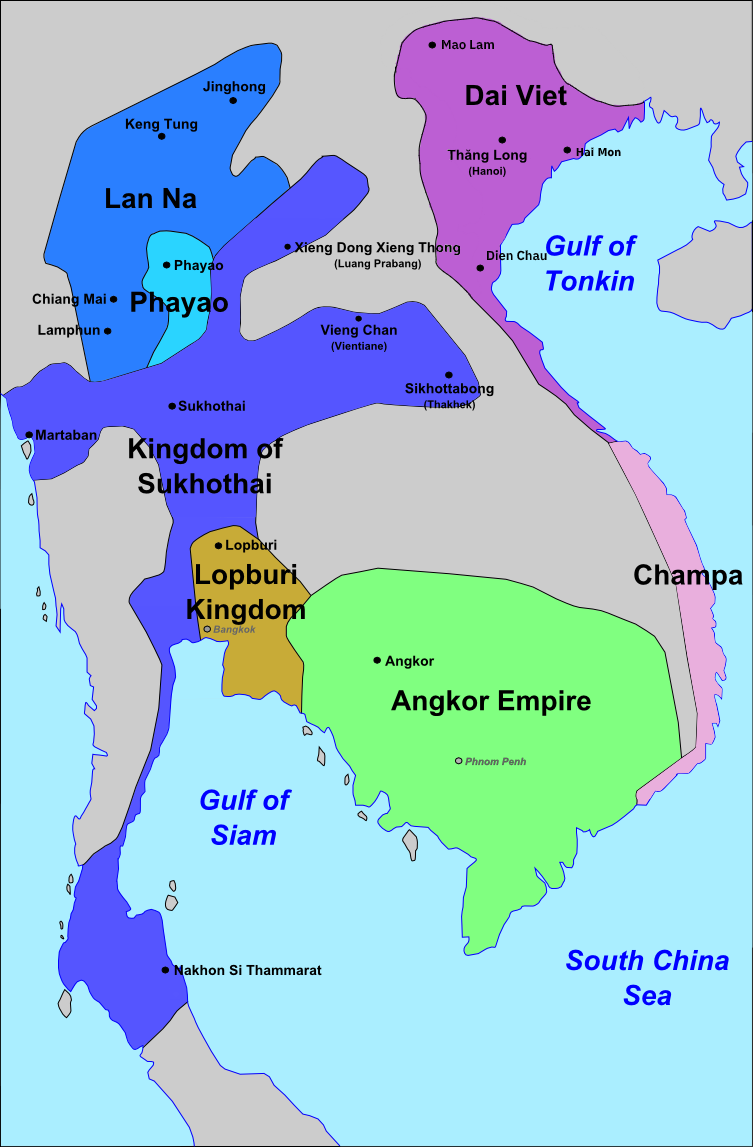
- Sukhothai Kingdom at its greatest extent during the late 13th century under the reign of King Ram Khamhaeng

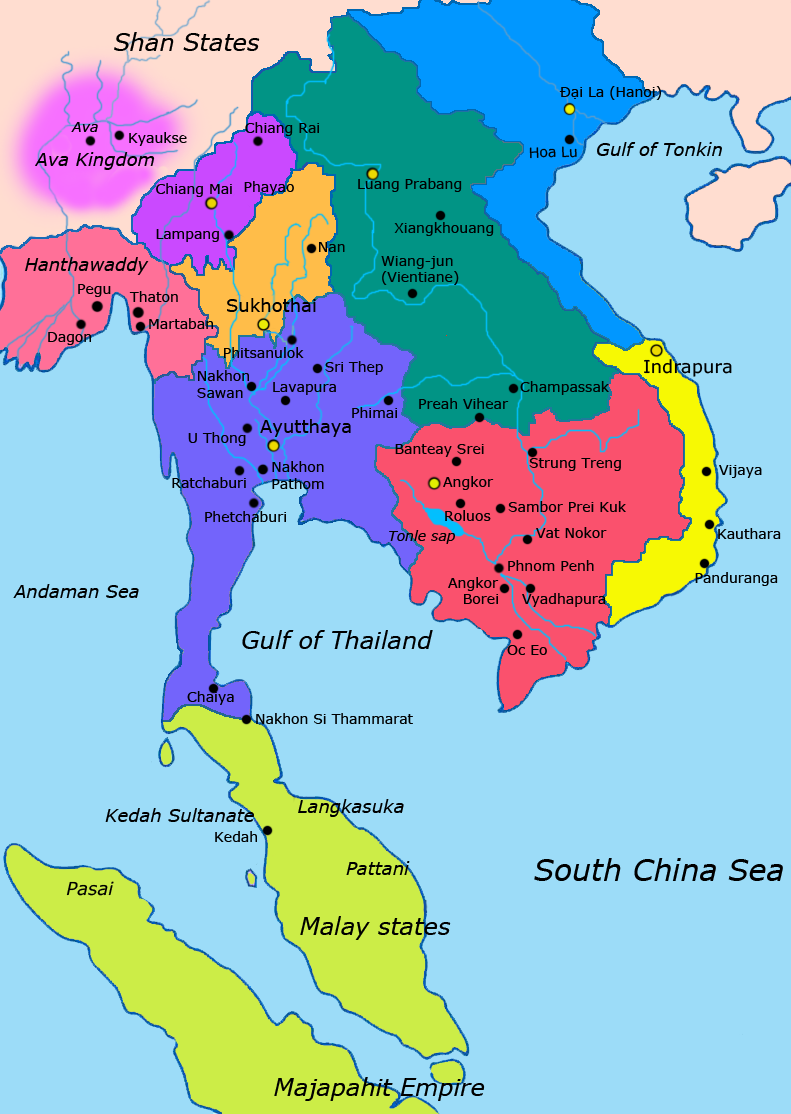
- Sukhothai Kingdom (orange) in 1400 CE
- Capital: Sukhothai (1238–1347); Song Khwae (1347–1438)
- Common languages: Old Thai
- Religion: Theravada Buddhism
- Government: Mandala kingdom
- Monarch
  - 1238–1270 (first): Si Inthrathit
  - 1279–1298: Ram Khamhaeng
  - 1347–1368: Li Thai
  - 1419–1438 (last): Borommapan
- Historical era: Post-classical era
  - Kingdom established: 1238
  - Tributary of Ayutthaya: 1378–1438
  - Annexed to Ayutthaya: 1438
  - Installation of Maha Thammarachathirat: 1569
- Currency: Cowries; Photduang
| Preceded by | Succeeded by |
| Lopburi Kingdom | Ayutthaya Kingdom |
- Today part of: Thailand; Laos; Malaysia; Myanmar

The Sukhothai Kingdom (Note: Thai: สุโขทัย, RTGS: Sukhothai, IAST: Sukhodaya, pronounced [sù.kʰǒː.tʰāj]) was a post-classical Siamese kingdom (maṇḍala) in Mainland Southeast Asia surrounding the ancient capital city of Sukhothai in present-day north-central Thailand. The kingdom was founded by Si Inthrathit in 1238 and existed as an independent polity until 1438, when it fell under the influence of the neighboring Ayutthaya after the death of Borommapan (Maha Thammaracha IV).

Sukhothai was originally a trade center in Lavo—itself under the suzerainty of the Khmer Empire—when Central Thai people led by Pho Khun Bang Klang Hao, a local leader, revolted and gained their independence. Bang Klang Hao took the regnal name of Si Inthrathit and became the first monarch of the Phra Ruang dynasty.

The kingdom was centralized and expanded to its greatest extent during the reign of Ram Khamhaeng the Great (1279–1298), who some historians considered to have introduced Theravada Buddhism and the initial Thai script to the kingdom. Ram Khamhaeng also initiated relations with Yuan China, through which the kingdom developed the techniques to produce and export ceramics like sangkhalok ware.

After the reign of Ram Khamhaeng, the kingdom fell into decline. In 1349, during the reign of Li Thai (Maha Thammaracha I), Sukhothai was invaded by the Ayutthaya Kingdom, a neighboring Thai polity. It remained a tributary state of Ayutthaya until it was annexed by the kingdom in 1438 after the death of Borommapan. Despite this, the Sukhothai nobility continued to influence the Ayutthaya monarchy in centuries after through the Sukhothai dynasty.

Sukhothai is traditionally known as "the first Thai kingdom" in Thai historiography, but current historical consensus agrees that the history of the Thai people began much earlier. The ruins of the kingdom's capital, now 12 km (7.5 mi) outside the modern town of Sukhothai Thani in Sukhothai Province, are preserved as the Sukhothai Historical Park and have been designated a UNESCO World Heritage Site.

== Etymology ==
The Thai term Sukhothai (Thai: สุโขทัย, Thai pronunciation: [sú khôo thaj]) is of compound Indic language origin—Sanskrit-Pali words sukha (Sanskrit: सुख, lit. 'pleasant, happiness') and udaya (Sanskrit: उदय, lit. 'ascent, rise of the sun') in the corruption form of the Sanskrit and Hindi terms Sukhodaya (Sanskrit: सुखोदय), Sukhada (Sanskrit: सुखदा), or Sukhadaya (Hindi: सुखदाय) which means "the dawn of happiness, the dawn of prosperity, rising happiness," and is explained as "The Happy Thai." The previous name when the city had risen circa 70 B.C. was called Sukda, Sukhada, and Sukhodaya before the later term Sukhothai applied in central Siam and also pronounced by the Mon-Khmer people occupying its territory at that period as Sakkadéa and in syncopated form Sakdéa or Sakda.

== History ==
=== Origins ===
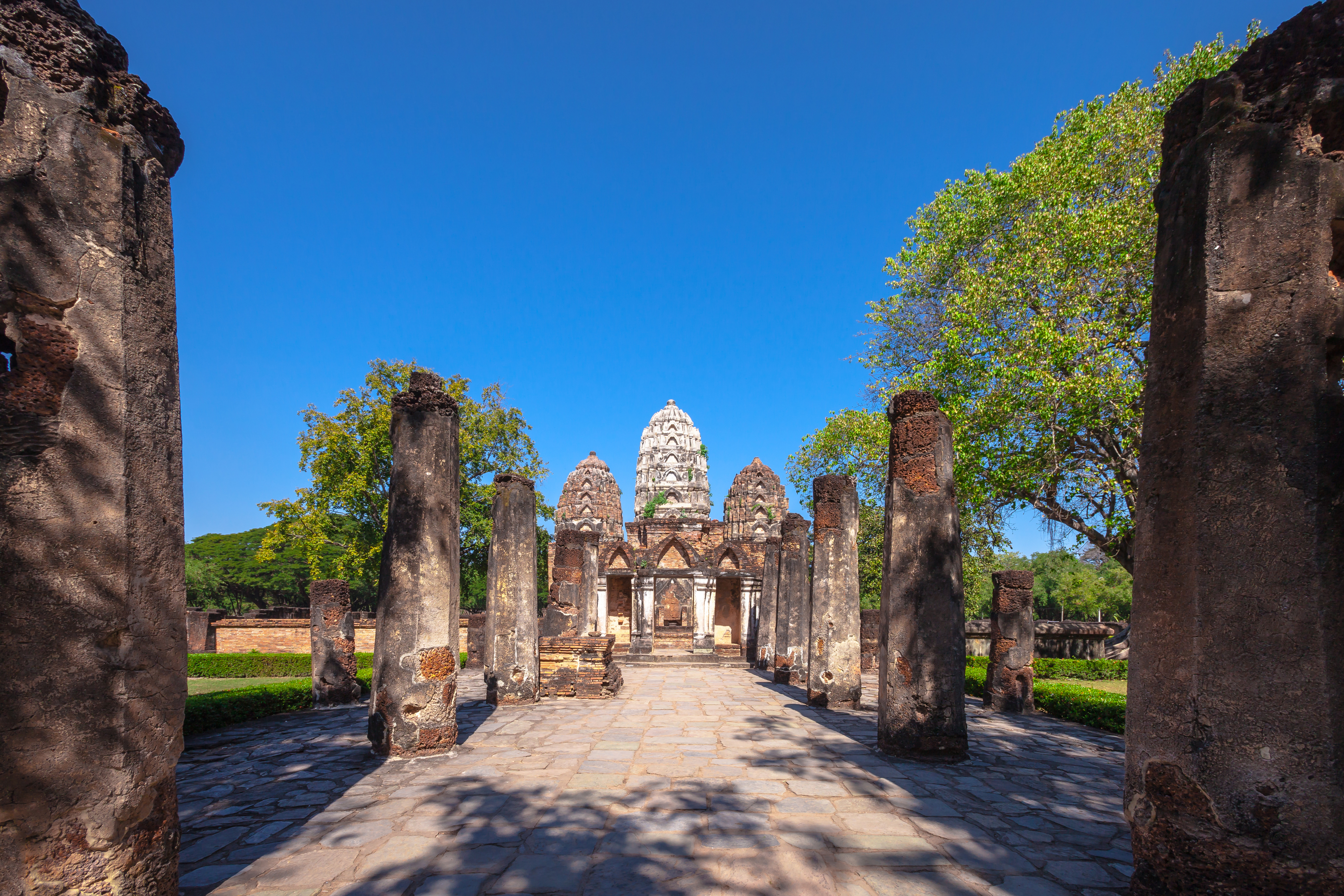
Wat Si Sawai at the Sukhothai Historical Park

According to the legend, the city of Sukhothai was founded in 494 BCE followed by its twin city of Chaliang (เชลียง) after Tai-speaking people migrated southward from the upper Mekong basin. Later in 500 CE, after the establishment of the Lavo Kingdom, a nobel from Lavo named Phalirat (Thai: พาลีราช) became the first Sukhothai governor. The following rulers after Phalirat remain unclear. It was expected that the city would be abandoned in the late 6th century due to the invasion of another Austroasiatic-speaking people from Umongasela (อุโมงคเสลา) in the present-day Fang and was then re-established in 957 by Aphai Kamini (อภัยคามินี) who evacuated from Haripuñjaya after the capital Haripuñjaya was sacked by Kuy people from Umongasela. Sukhothai declared independence from Umongasela in 1017 during the reign of Arun Kuman (อรุณกุมาร), which continued until the establishment of the Sukhothai Kingdom in 1238.

A Khmer-style town first appeared at Sukhothai around 1200. About some fifty kilometers north of Sukhodaya stood another sister town, Sri Sajanalaya, that would later become Si Satchanalai (Thai: ศรีสัชนาลัย), an important center of Sukhothai politics alongside the capital. Under Lavo control, various monuments was built in the city, several of which still stand in the Sukhothai Historical Park. They include the Ta Pha Daeng Shrine, Wat Phra Phai Luang, and Wat Si Sawai.

In contrast, some historians suggest the migration of Tai peoples into Mainland Southeast Asia was somewhat gradual, and likely took place between the 8th and 10th centuries. Prior to the rise of Sukhothai, various other Tai kingdoms existed in the neighboring northern highlands. These include Ngoenyang of the Northern Thai people (present-day Chiang Saen) and Chiang Hung of the Tai Lue people (present-day Jinghong, China). According to semi-legendary Shan documents, the Mau Shan Prince, Sam Lung-pha of Mogaung, before he established the Tai kingdom of the Ahom in Assam in 1229, raided the Menam valley and the Malay peninsula as far as Tawi (Dawei) and Yansaleng (Junk Ceylon?). This purported influx of armed Tai may have had something to do with establishing the Tai kingdom of Sukhothai.

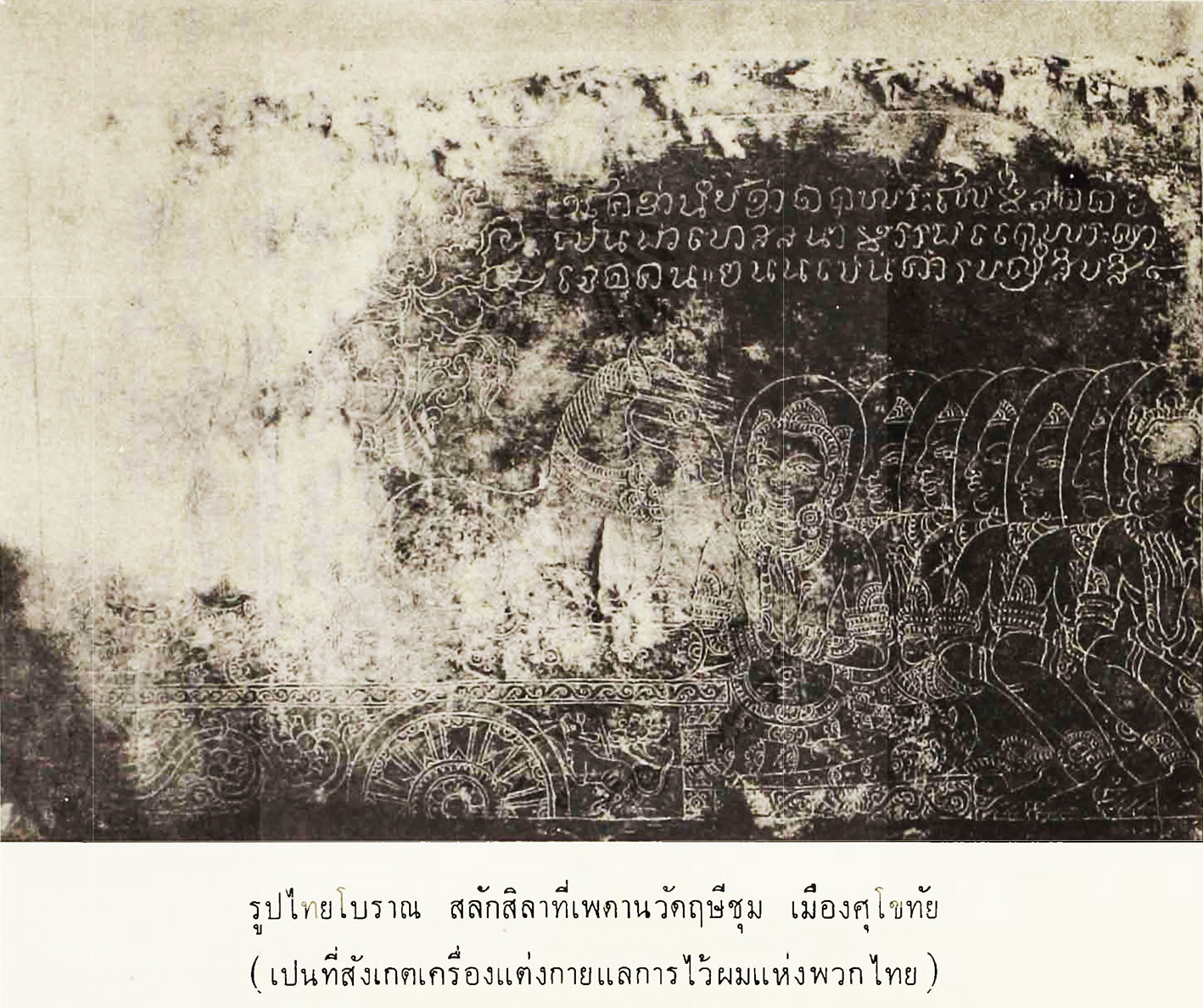
Ancient Thais (clothing and hair style) in the Sukhothai era found on the Wat Si Chum stone.

According to legend, in 1238, a group of Central Thai peoples led by a local mueang chief, Pho Khun Bang Klang Hao, rebelled against the governor at Sukhodaya and established Sukhothai as an independent Thai state. Bang Klang Hao was assisted by a local ally, Pho Khun Pha Mueang. This event was a turning point in the history of the Tai peoples, as Sukhothai would remain the center of Tai power until the end of the 14th century.

Bang Klang Hao ruled Sukhothai under the regnal name Si Inthrathit and established the Phra Ruang dynasty. Under the rule of Si Inthrathit, the primordial kingdom expanded its influence to the bordering cities surrounding the capital. By the end of his reign in 1270, Sukhothai covered the entire upper valley of the Chao Phraya River, then known simply as Mae Nam (Thai: แม่น้ำ, 'mother of waters'), the generic Thai name for all rivers.

=== Expansion under Ram Khamhaeng ===
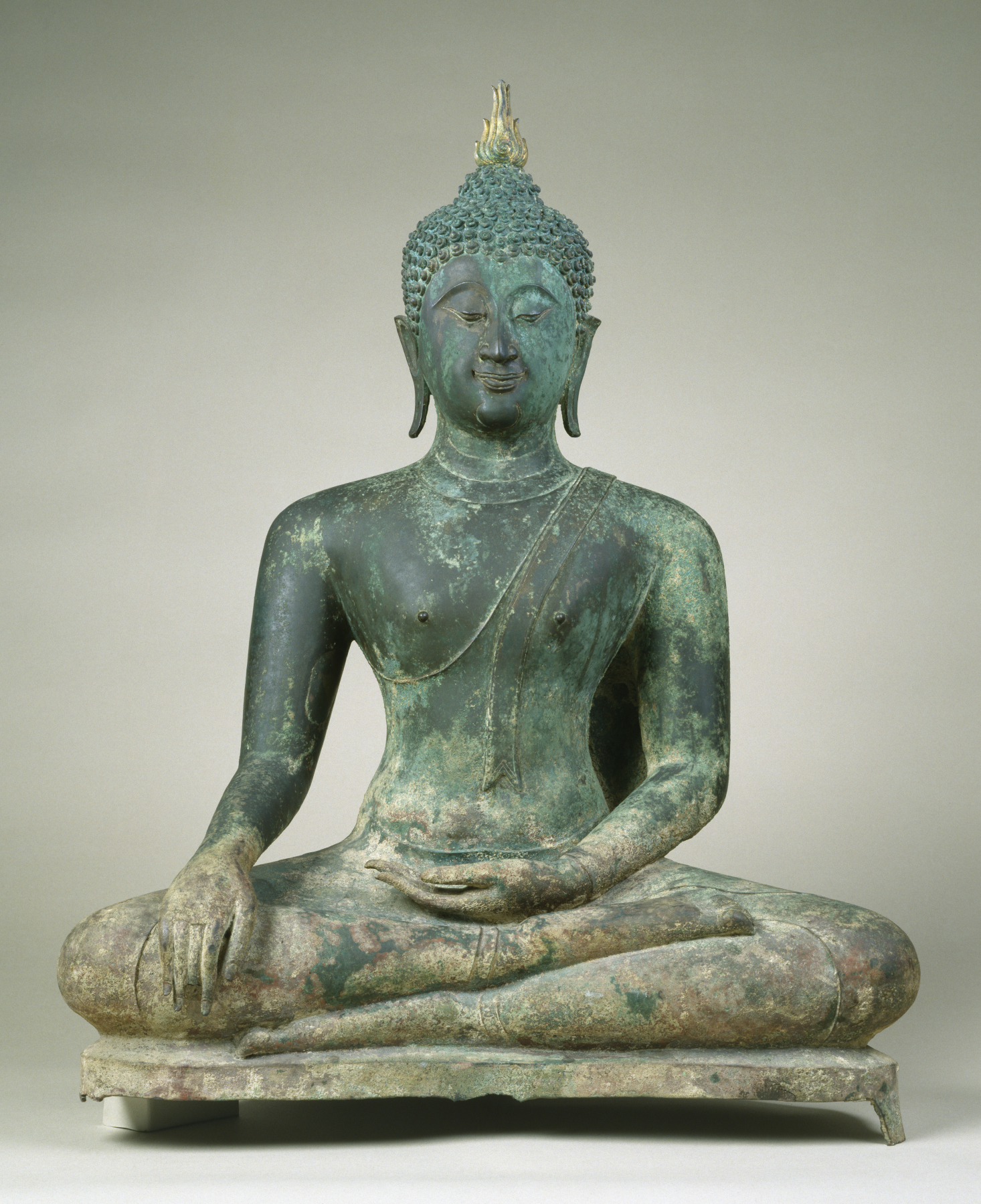
A Māravijaya Buddha from Sukhothai, dated to the second half of the 13th century, at the Walters Art Museum.

In 1270, Si Inthrathit died and was succeeded by his son Ban Mueang. At the end of Ban Mueang's reign, he was succeeded by his brother Ram Khamhaeng the Great; both expanded Sukhothai beyond the borders established by their father. To the south, Ram Khamhaeng subjugated the mandala kingdoms of Suvarnabhumi (likely present-day Suphan Buri) and Tambralinga (present-day Nakhon Si Thammarat). Through the acquisition of Tambralinga, Ram Khamhaeng is said to have adopted Theravada Buddhism as the state religion of Sukhothai; the accuracy of these claims by traditional historians is disputed.

To the north, Ram Khamhaeng placed Phrae and Muang Sua (present-day Luang Prabang, Laos), among other mandala city-states, under tribute. To the west, Ram Khamhaeng helped assist the Mon people under Wareru (who is said to have eloped with Ram Khamhaeng's daughter) in their rebellion against Pagan control, and Wareru would establish a kingdom at Martaban, the predecessor to Hanthawaddy (present-day Bago, Myanmar). Martaban is traditionally considered a tributary state of Sukhothai, but such Sukhothai domination may not have extended that far.

With regard to religion and culture, Ram Khamhaeng requested monks from Sri Thamnakorn to propagate Theravada Buddhism in Sukhothai. In 1283, the Sukhothai script was likely invented by Ram Khamhaeng; the earliest evidence of this ancient Thai writing is seen in the Ram Khamhaeng Inscription, discovered by Mongkut (Rama IV) nearly six centuries later. The script later evolved into the modern Thai script of today.

It was also during this time that the first relations with Yuan China were established and Sukhothai began sending trade missions to China. The well-known exported good of Sukhothai was the sangkhalok ware. This was the only period in Thai history that Siam produced Chinese-style ceramics, and they fell out of use by the 14th century.

=== Decline and tributary status ===
By the beginning of the fourteenth century, Sukhothai controlled the Chao Phraya plain, with spurs West to the Hanthawaddy Kingdom and South to the Nakhon Si Thammarat Kingdom. After the death of Ram Khamhaeng, he was succeeded by his son Loe Thai.

Tributary states of Sukhothai began to break away rapidly after the death of Ram Khamhaeng. To the north, Uttaradit and the Lao kingdoms of Muang Sua and Vieng Chan Vieng Kham (present-day Vientiane) liberated themselves from their Sukhothai overlords. In 1319, Martaban in the west broke away. In 1321, Lan Na (the successor state to Ngoenyang) annexed Tak, one of the oldest towns in Sukhothai. To the south, Suphan Buri also broke free early in the reign of Loe Thai. Thus, the kingdom was quickly reduced to its former status as merely a local power.

In 1323, Loe Thai was succeeded by his cousin, Ngua Nam Thum. In 1347, he was succeeded by Li Thai (Maha Thammaracha I), the son of Loe Thai. In 1349, armies from Ayutthaya invaded the kingdom and forced Sukhothai to become its tributary. The center of power in the tributary state shifted to Song Khwae (present-day Phitsanulok). In 1378, Lue Thai (Maha Thammaracha II) had to submit to this new Thai power as a vassal state. He was succeeded by Sai Lue Thai (Maha Thammaracha III) in 1399.

In 1424, after the death of Sai Lue Thai, his sons Phaya Ram and Phaya Ban Mueang fought for the throne. Intharacha of Ayutthaya intervened and installed Ban Mueang as Borommapan (Maha Thammaracha IV). When Borommapan died in 1438, Borommarachathirat II of Ayutthaya installed his son Ramesuan (the future Borommatrailokkanat of Ayutthaya) as Upparat in Sukhothai, a position similar to both that of a viceroy and an heir presumptive, establishing a form of personal union and creating the Siamese Front Palace system. Prince Ramesuan was presumably accompanied by Ayutthayan administrative staff and a military garrison, thus affirming the end of Sukhothai as an independent kingdom.

=== Annexation and further influence ===
Under tributary status, the former territories of Sukhothai, known to the people of Ayutthaya as the Northern Cities (Thai: เมืองเหนือ, RTGS: Mueang Nua), continued to be ruled by local aristocrats under Ayutthaya's overlordship per the mandala systems of both dominions. The mandalas would politically and culturally merge during the 15th and 16th centuries, and Sukhothai's warfare, administration, architecture, religious practice, and language influenced those of Ayutthaya. Sukhothai nobles linked themselves with the Ayutthayan elite through marriage alliances, and often played the role of kingmaker in Ayutthayan succession conflicts. Sukhothai military leaders served prominently in Ayutthaya's army as the military tradition of Sukhothai was considered to be tougher.

From 1456 to 1474, former Sukhothai territory became a battleground during the Ayutthaya-Lan Na War (1441–1474). In 1462, Sukhothai briefly rebelled against Ayutthaya and allied itself with their enemy, Lan Na. In 1463, Borommatrailokkanat temporarily moved the monarch's residence to Song Khwae, presumably to be closer to the frontline, and the city was permanently renamed to Phitsanulok. Contemporary Portuguese traders described Ayutthaya and Phitsanulok as "twin states".

In 1548, Maha Chakkraphat named Khun Phirenthorathep, a noble from the Sukhothai clan, as the leader in Phitsanulok. Phirenthorathep was conferred with the name Maha Thammaracha in line with the historical kings of Sukhothai, and married one of Maha Chakkraphat's daughters, strengthening his claim to both a historical and present monarchy. Despite this, the title of Upparat went to Maha Chakkraphat's son Ramesuan (who died in 1564) and later his brother Mahinthrathirat. After a series of wars with the Burmese Toungoo Empire, Maha Thammaracha allied himself with the Burmese against Ayutthaya. In 1569, Ayutthaya under Mahinthrathirat fell to the Burmese, and Bayinnaung installed Maha Thammaracha (Sanphet I) as the vassal king in Ayutthaya and the first king of the Sukhothai dynasty.

In 1584, Maha Thammaracha and his son, the Upparat and future Naresuan the Great (Sanphet II), would free Ayutthaya from Burmese overlordship in the Burmese-Siamese War of 1584–1593. After the Battle of the Sittaung River, Naresuan forcibly relocated people from the northern cities of Phitsanulok, Sukhothai, Phichai, Sawankhalok, Kamphaeng Phet, Phichit, and Phra Bang closer to Ayutthaya. Since then, the ruins of the capital city of the former Sukhothai Kingdom have been preserved as the Sukhothai Historical Park and designated a World Heritage Site.

== Legacy ==
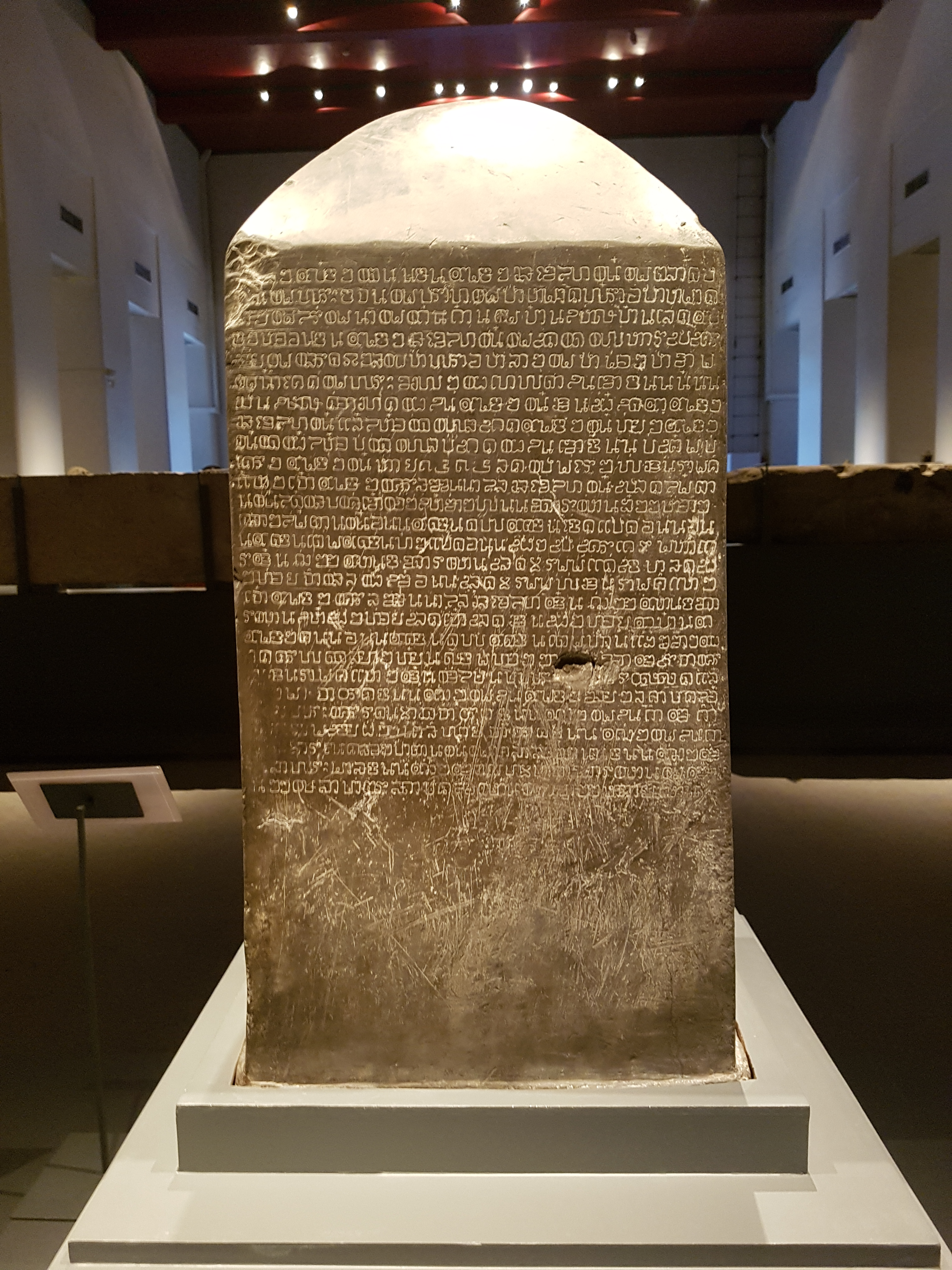
The Ram Khamhaeng Inscription at the Bangkok National Museum

The Silajaruek of Sukhothai are hundreds of stone inscriptions that form a historical record of the period. Among the most important inscriptions are the Ram Khamhaeng Inscription (also known as Inscription No. 1), Silajaruek Wat Srichum (an account on the history of the region itself and of Sri Lanka), and Silajaruek Wat Pamamuang (a politico-religious record of Loe Thai).

Mongkut (Rama IV) is considered the champion of Sukhothai narrative history due to his discovery of Inscription No. 1, the "first evidence" of the history of Sukhothai. Mongkut said that he found a "first stone inscription" in Sukhothai which told of heroic kings such as Ram Khamhaeng, the administrative system, and other developments in what was considered the "prosperous time" of the kingdom. The story of Sukhothai was incorporated into Thailand's "national history" in the late 19th century by Mongkut as a historical work presented to the British diplomatic mission.

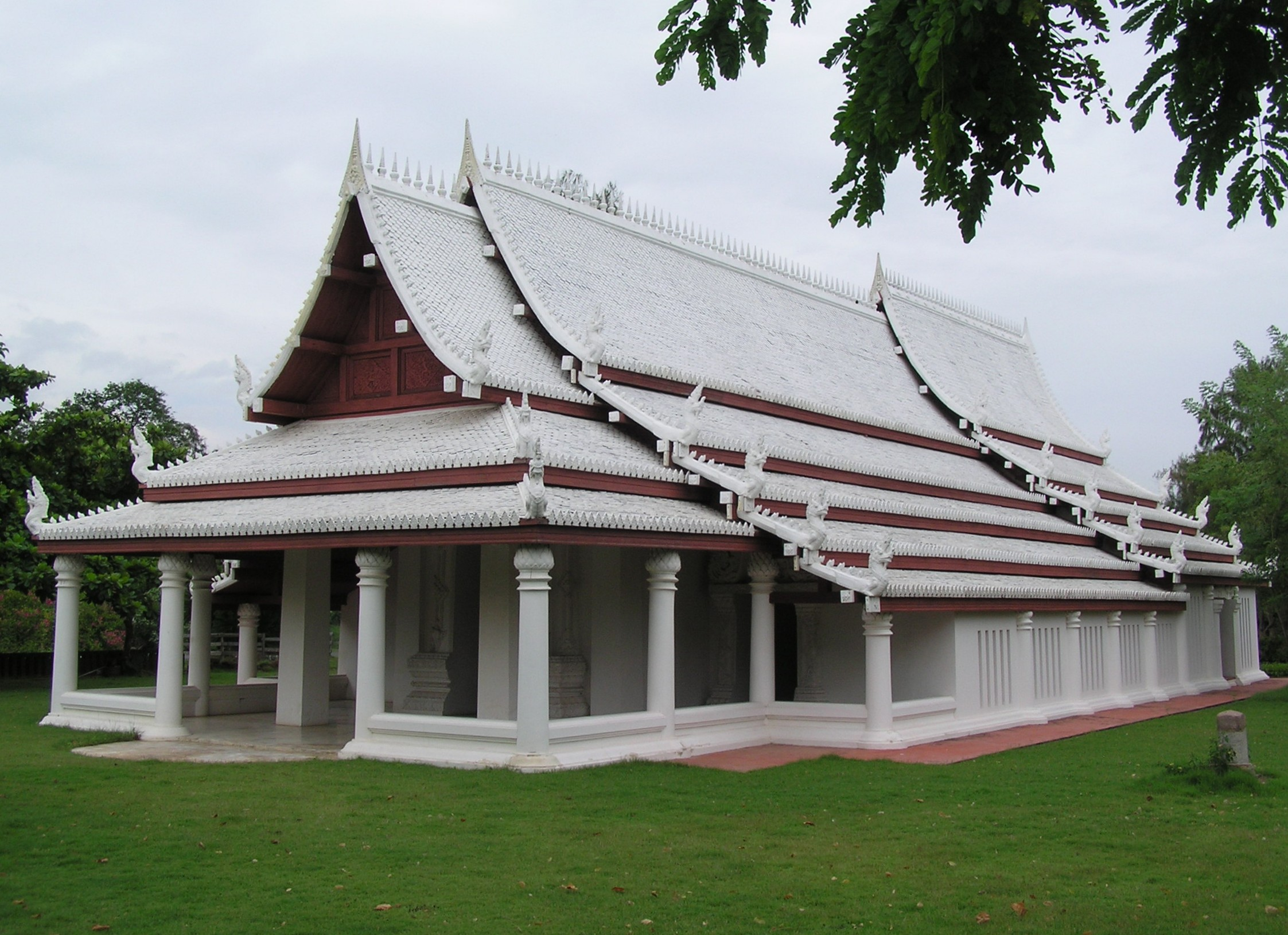
Replica of a Sukhothai royal temple at Mueang Boran

From then on, as a part of modern nation-building process, modern national Siamese history included the history of the Sukhothai Kingdom. Sukhothai was said to be the "first national capital", followed by Ayutthaya and Thonburi, until Rattanakosin, or today Bangkok. Sukhothai history was crucial among Siam's "modernists", both "conservative" and "revolutionary". Sukhothai history became even more important after the Siamese Revolution of 1932. Research and writing on Sukhothai history were abundant. Ideas derived from the inscription were studied and "theorised".

One of the most well-known topics was Sukhothai's "democracy" rule. Stories of the close relationship between the king and his people, vividly described as a "father-son" relationship, were considered the "seed" of ancient Thai democracy; however, changes in government took place when later society embraced "foreign" traditions, like those of Angkor, influenced by Hinduism and "mystic" Mahayana Buddhism. The story of Sukhothai became the model of "freedom". Chit Phumisak, a "revolutionary" scholar, saw the Sukhothai period as the beginning of the Thai people's liberation from their foreign ruler in Angkor.

During military rule beginning in the 1950s, Sukhothai was increasingly featured in the Thai national history curriculum. Sukhothai's "father-son" model for Thai democracy in contrast to Angkorian tradition became one of freedom from the "foreign ideology" of Cambodian communism. Other aspects of Sukhothai were also explored under the new curriculum, such as the commoner and slave status as well as economics. These topics became the subject of ideological controversy during the Cold War and the communist insurgency in Thailand.

== See also ==
- Mandala (political model)
- List of Thai monarchs

== Notes ==
— Royal house — Sukhothai dynasty Founding year: 1238
| Preceded by Lopburi Kingdom | Ruling dynasty of the Sukhothai Kingdom; 1238–1583 | Succeeded by Ayutthaya Kingdom |
