= Maha Thammaracha IV =

King of Sukhothai (1419–1438)

Maha Thammaracha IV มหาธรรมราชาที่ ๔
- King of Sukhothai

King of Sukhothai
- Reign: 1419–1438
- Predecessor: Sai Lue Thai
- Successor: Ramesuan (as Ayutthaya viceroy)
- Died: 1438
Names
- Phaya Banmeung, Phra Maha Thammaracha IV
- Dynasty: Phra Ruang
- Father: Sai Lue Thai

Maha Thammaracha IV (Thai: มหาธรรมราชาที่ ๔, pronounced [mā.hǎː tʰām.mā.rāː.t͡ɕʰāː tʰîː sìː]), born as Borommapan (Thai: บรมปาล, pronounced [bɔ̄ː.rōm.mā.pāːn]), was the last king of the Sukhothai Kingdom.

In 1419, after the death of Sai Lue Thai, his sons Phaya Ram and Phaya Ban Mueang fought for the throne. Intharacha of Ayutthaya Kingdom intervened and further divided the kingdom between the two. Ban Mueang was installed as a vassal king, owing allegiance to Ayutthaya. His residence was in Phitsanulok, though the kingdom was still referred to as "Sukhothai". In 1430, he moved his residence back to the old capital. When Maha Thammaracha IV died in 1438, King Borommaracha II of Ayutthaya installed his son Ramesuan (the future king Borommatrailokkanat of Ayutthaya) as viceroy of Sukhothai, thus marking the end of Sukhothai as a separate kingdom.

Maha Thammaracha IV Phra Ruang Dynasty Born: ? Died: 1438
Regnal titles
Preceded by Maha Thammaracha III	King of Sukhothai; 1419–1438	Succeeded by Ramesuan
