= Borommarachathirat II =

King of Ayutthaya from 1424 to 1448

Borommarachathirat II บรมราชาธิราชที่ ๒

King of Ayutthaya
- Reign: 1424–1448
- Predecessor: Intharacha
- Successor: Borommatrailokkanat
- Born: 1386
- Died: 1448 (aged 61–62)
- Consort: Sister of Maha Thammaracha III
- Issue: Intharacha; Phraek; Borommatrailokkanat
- Dynasty: Suphannaphum
- Father: Intharacha
- Mother: Sister of Maha Thammaracha II

Borommarachathirat II, or Borom Rachathirat II (Thai: บรมราชาธิราชที่ ๒), also known as King Sam Phraya (Thai: เจ้าสามพระยา, RTGS: Chao Sam Phraya) (1386–1448), was a monarch of the Ayutthaya Kingdom who reigned in the early 15th century. He is noted in Thai historiography for his roles in administration and warfare, and is associated with a period of heightened Ayutthayan activity in mainland Southeast Asia. During his reign, Ayutthaya conducted campaigns against the Lanna Kingdom and Khmer polities, and later traditions link his rule to the capture and looting of Angkor in 1431. He also appears in accounts concerning the consolidation of royal authority and the management of the kingdom's political and military affairs.

== History ==
He was a son of Intharacha, who had secured the Ayutthayan throne for the Suphannaphum dynasty. He had two elder brothers, Prince Aiphraya and Prince Yiphraya, and was appointed by his father as governor of Chainat (the old name of Phitsanulok).

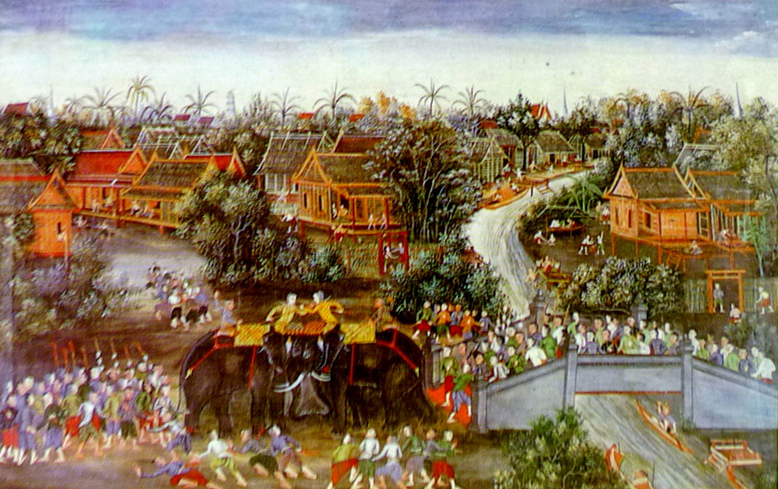
A painting, depicting the event in which two sons of King Intharacha fought each other to the death on elephants at Pa Than Bridge. The painting is now in the Warophatphiman Hall, Bang Pa-In Royal Palace.

In 1424, upon the death of Intharacha, his two older brothers marched from their respective cities to Ayutthaya to claim the throne. They engaged in single combat on elephants, during which both were killed, leaving the throne to Sam Phraya. In 1433, Sam Phraya led Siamese forces in a campaign against Cambodia—then the post-Angkor Khmer Kingdom—and plundered Angkor Thom. The attack contributed to the Khmers' abandonment of Angkor and the relocation of their capital further to the southeast.

And he ordered the Nakhonin to rule in Cambodia. Later, the Nakhonin died, he appointed the Prince of Phrak, his another son to reign in Cambodia. But the prince was assassinated by Ponhea Yat. Therefore allowing Ponhea Yat to become king instead of the prince. After that, Ponhea Yat moved the capital to Chaktomuk. To escape the influence of Siam, and wanting to move the center closer to the sea to further promote maritime trade.

The conquest, however, brought in a large influx of Khmer culture and traditions into the Siamese court. For example, the idea of the Thai king as a divine figure—the Devaraja concept—was adopted from Angkor.

In 1442, King Sam Phraya launched a major military expedition to conquer Lan Na during a period of succession turmoil following the death of King Sam Fang Kaen. Although the Ayutthayan forces reached and laid siege to the capital of Chiang Mai, they were unable to capture the city or achieve a decisive victory over the newly ascended King Tilokaraj. The campaign ended in a retreat after King Sam Phraya reportedly fell ill during the siege.

King Sam Phraya also sought northward expansion. He married a daughter of the vassal Prince of Sukhothai, Maha Tammaraja IV, and had a son, who will grow up to be Prince Ramesuan. When the last king of Sukhothai died in 1446, his grandson inherited the kingdom, further strengthening Ayutthaya control over Sukhothai.

King Sam Phraya died in 1448 and was succeeded by his son Prince Ramesuan as Trilokanat.

== Legacy ==
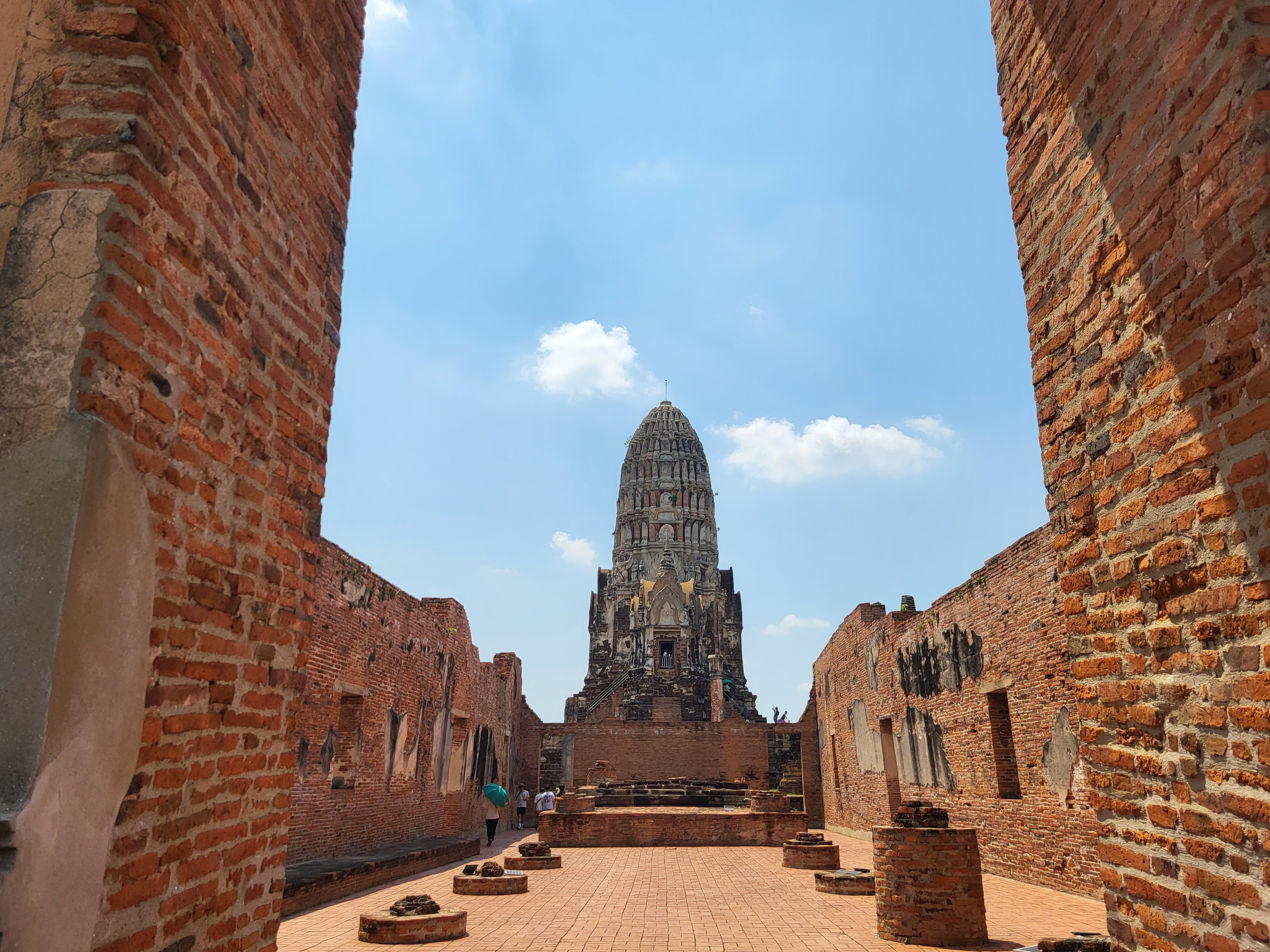
Wat Ratchaburana

King Borommarachathirat II's reign is considered a watershed moment in the history of Ayutthaya, marking the transition from a loose mandala polity to a more centralized kingdom. His military and administrative actions had lasting impacts on Siamese statecraft and culture.

He is credited with the final consolidation of the Sukhothai Kingdom into the Ayutthaya sphere of influence. By appointing his son, Prince Ramesuan (later King Borommatrailokkanat), to rule Phitsanulok, he effectively merged the northern ruling bloodlines with the southern Ayutthayan dynasty, paving the way for the full integration of the two kingdoms.

Although Ayutthaya did not permanently occupy Angkor after the 1431 conquest of Angkor (Angkor Thom), the Ayutthayan court reportedly relocated numerous Khmer officials, Brahmins, artisans, and administrators to the capital. This influx of Khmer elite culture led to the adoption of the Devaraja (God-king) concept.

In 1424, he commissioned the construction of Wat Ratchaburana at the site where his two elder brothers, Chao Ai Phraya and Chao Yi Phraya, died in combat for the throne. The temple's prang (tower) is considered a masterpiece of early Ayutthaya architecture, blending Khmer and Sukhothai artistic influences. The temple's crypt, discovered in the 20th century, contained a vast hoard of gold artifacts and votive tablets, testifying to the wealth and power of his reign.

Borommarachathirat II House of Suphannaphum Born: 1386 Died: 1448
Regnal titles
Preceded by Intharacha	King of Ayutthaya; 1424–1448	Succeeded by Borommatrailokkanat
Unknown	Ruler of Chainat ?–1424	Unknown
