= Thado Dhamma Yaza =

Thado Dhamma Yaza was a Burmese royal title.

== Kings ==
- Thalun: Viceroy of Prome (r. 1620–1628), King of Burma (r. 1629–1648)
- Thado Dhamma Raza: King of Mrauk-U (r. 1593–1612)

== Viceroys ==
- Thado Dhamma Yaza I of Prome: Viceroy of Prome (r. 1542–1550), King of Prome (r. 1550–1551)
- Thado Dhamma Yaza II of Prome: Viceroy of Prome (r. 1551–1588)
- Thado Dhamma Yaza III of Prome: Viceroy of Prome (r. 1589–1597)

== See also ==
- Dharmaraja (disambiguation)
