= Sangkhalok ceramic ware =

Sangkhalok ceramic wares (Thai: สังคโลก) are ancient Thai traditional ceramic ware specifically derived from Sukhothai kingdom period. Decorated with traditional motifs, and fired at 1,150-1,280 °C, made into pottery, jar, teapot, spoon, and ceramic doll. The technique of manufacturing and firing dates from the beginning of Sukhothai period (1238-1351) through the end of Ayutthaya kingdom (1351 – 1767) according to evidence of ancient kiln that appear around Si Satchanalai District in Sukhothai province, Thailand.

== History ==
The determination of the age of Sangkhalok ware from evidence found from the Sangkhalok ware with a green ceramic ware of China in the Yuan Dynasty vessel that sank beneath the gulf of Thailand with the title Rang Kwian. Set its origin of the early 19th century and compare chinaware and pottery of Chinese Ming Dynasty found in the Philippines. The Sangkhalok ware set to last between 18th-19th centuries, the production of Sangkhalok ware from the Sukhothai period. But has been promoting the product and expanding mass production in the Ayutthaya kingdom period. Sangkhalok ware production declined since the 17th century. The key reason is that the marketplace is changing need of Sangkhalok ware, the Chinese returned to manufacture porcelain blue – white, which became a popular trade and Ayutthaya can’t produce as to the demands of Westerners who have a political role in the region.

== Terminology ==
The term Sangkhalok is assumed from different source. Some of that comes from the word "Song kolok" means stove envelope. Some say those come from the word "Sankoroku" in Japanese, which might came from the word “Sawankhalok”. That was a popular name in city of Si satchanalai in Thai history. The original meaning limited in area of Si satchanalai and the relationship city like Ayuthaya referent from founding many stove manufacturers in this area. However furnace manufacturers in northern Thailand has produced many of the category called Sangkhalok as well.

== Feature ==
The pottery is made in very fine ceramic and glazed signature Kai Ka color (ไข่กา, green olive colour. Literally translated to Crow's egg), and a grain ivory stripes. The evolution of coated green exquisite pottery making has named Green as "Celadon" which painted a different color, such as green olives.

== Category ==
The pattern of Sangkhalok ware is divided into many different types due many techniques of manufacturing, such as;

- The high strength unglazed ceramic ware, decorated with motif by pressure print a molding technique and attach to a pottery before burn, may be the first invented technique and decent to the period after.
- The dark brown glazed pottery, the characteristic and color similar to pottery from Lopburi in brown glazed types
- The white glazed pottery with beautiful draw motif under the glaze in brown, similar to Chinese’s Shu Jol pottery
- The white glazed pottery with beautiful draw motif above the glaze in golden brown
- The strong unglazed pottery half stone ware dip in mud water then draw with red motif
- The green glazed pottery or the Celadon, decorated by draw chamfer into the surface then glaze and bure

== Manufacturing ==
=== Location ===
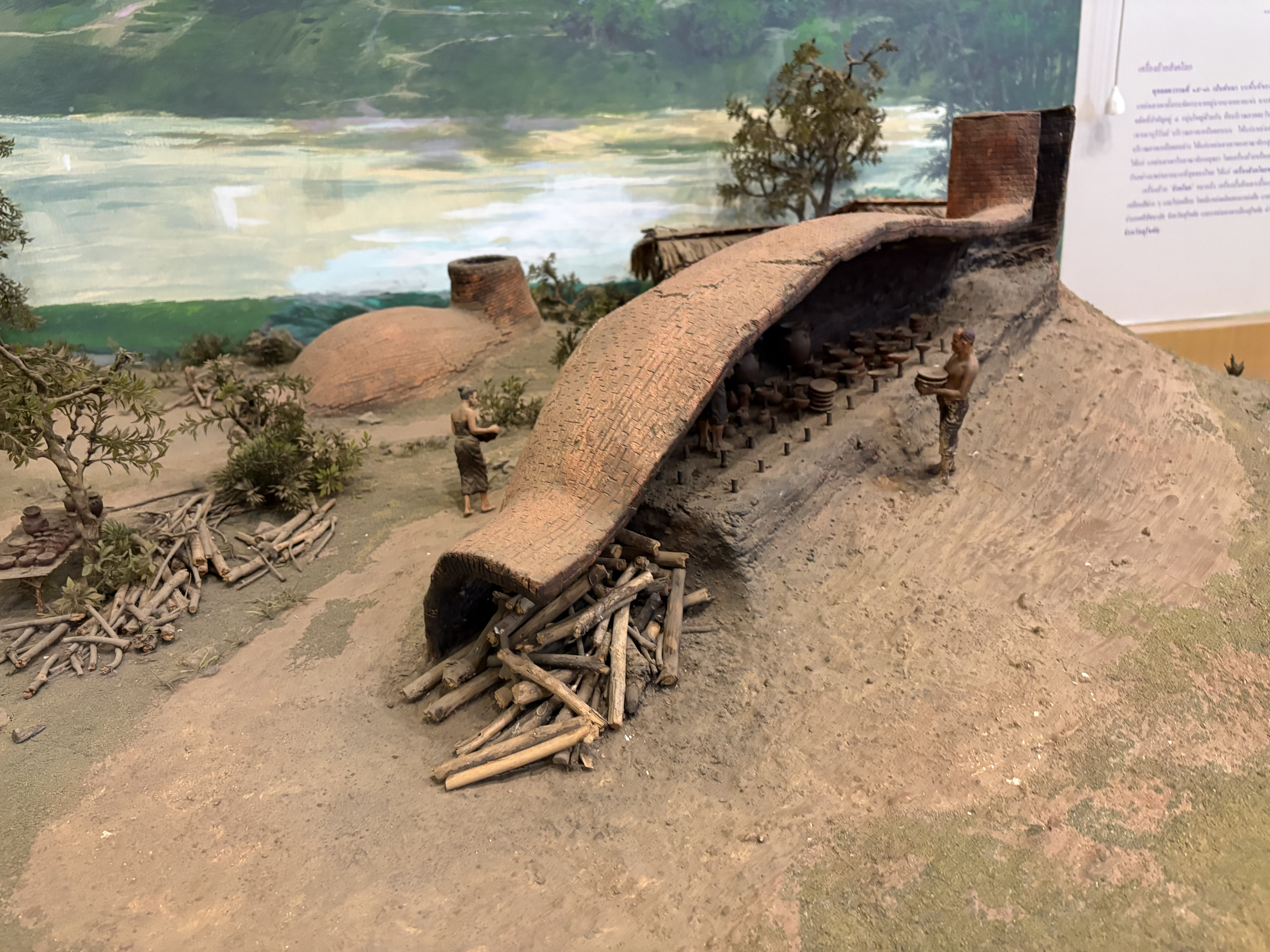
A scale model depicting Sangkhalok kilns as found in Ban Pa Yang, Si Satchanalai, exhibition at Sawanvoranayok National Museum

The manufacturing places are usually found located in Si Satchanalai district in Sukhothai province, the area was once called the "Si Satchanalai kiln area" as evidence of ancient kilns were found scattered through the area.

=== Material ===
The main material for manufacturing the Sangkhalok ware is clay from the local area around the kiln area, probably the alluvial deposit of the Yom River.

=== Molding ===
The process of creating the primary shape of the pottery is usually done by a high-skilled craftsman with a lot of training experience. The primary tool of this kind of potter is bare hands for creating the desired shape shape. The method popular among the current craftsman is to mold on a spinning wheel for symmetry. For easier molding, the craftsman always uses water to keep the work wet to soften the clay and to obtain a smooth surface. Other tools to assist molding are a cutting wire and trowel.

=== Coloring ===
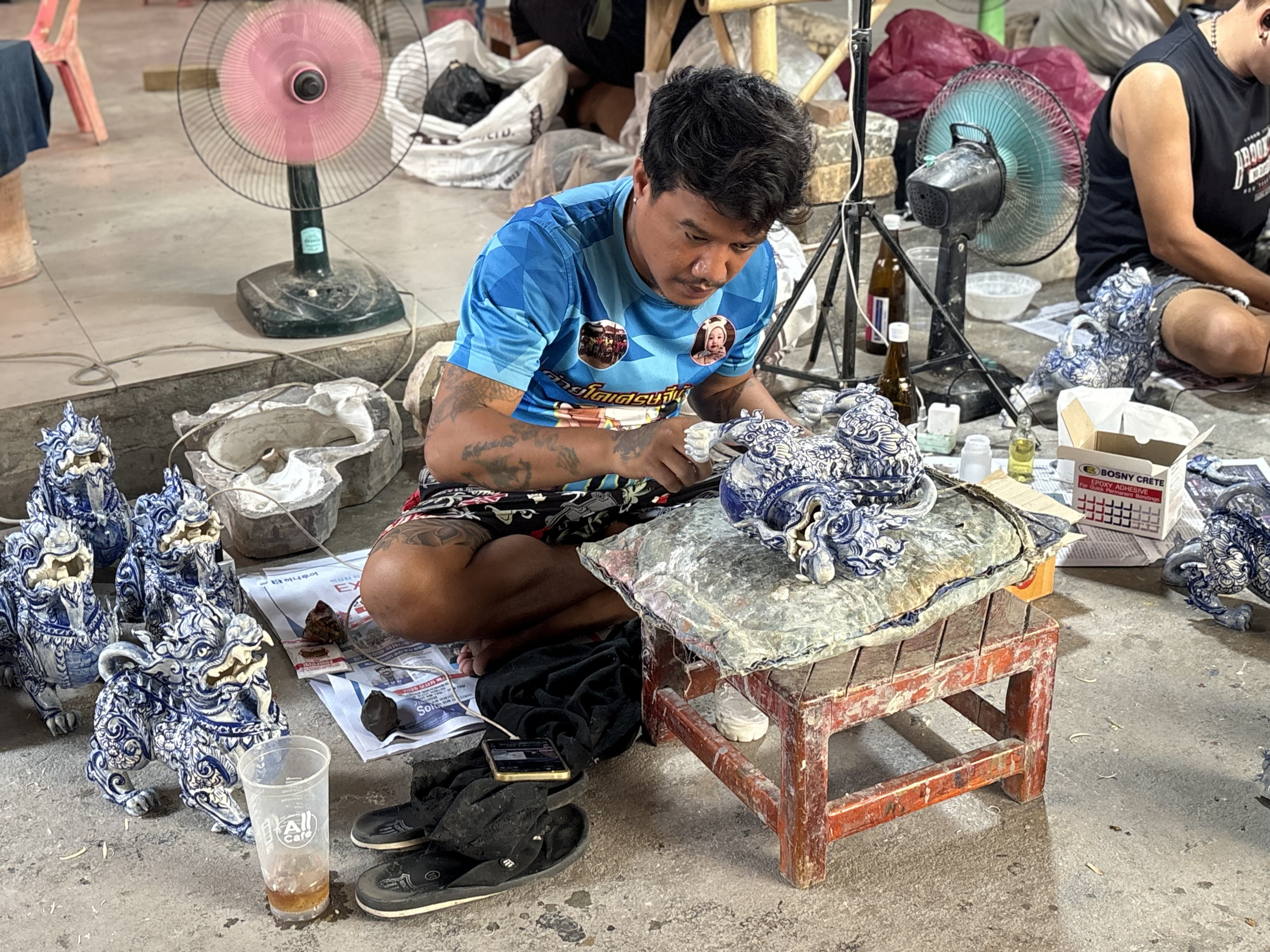
A craftsman painting at a sangkhalok maker in Mueang Sukhothai

Motifs that appear in Sangkhalok ware are specific patterns. For dishes and bowls, these are usually fish, flowers and wheels, the fish are usually assumed to be a Black sharkminnow. The hand-drawing style is very distinguished and identical to the local cultural artistic style. The coloring is usually achieved by dipping in or blushing with color made of powder that when burned at a particular temperature will set the desired color.

=== Firing ===
The piece is fired to 1260°C in a low-oxygen environment in a type of kiln called Thu-riang (Thai: ทุเรียง).

== Gallery ==
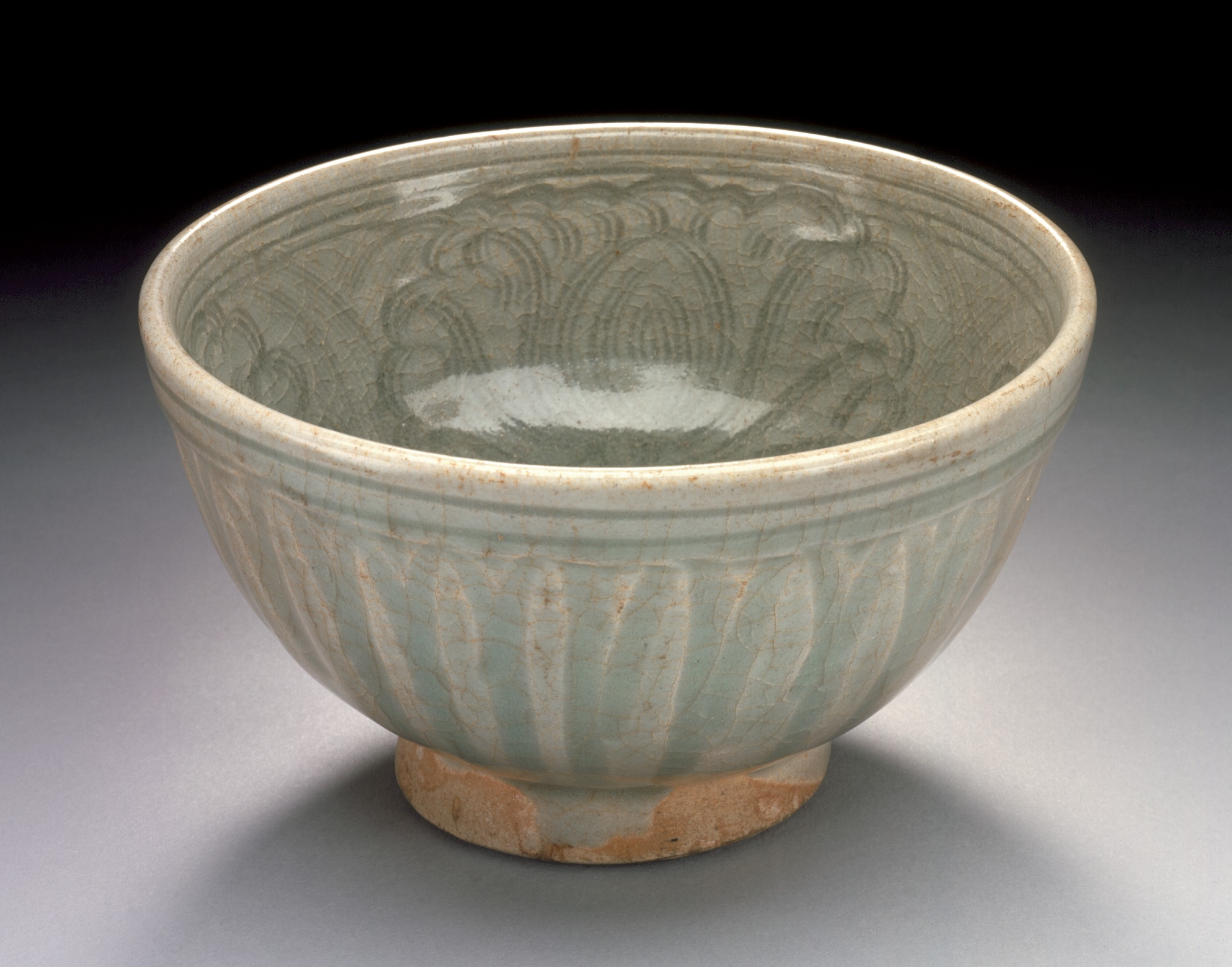
Bowl with incised peony designs, Sri Satchanalai, 15th century

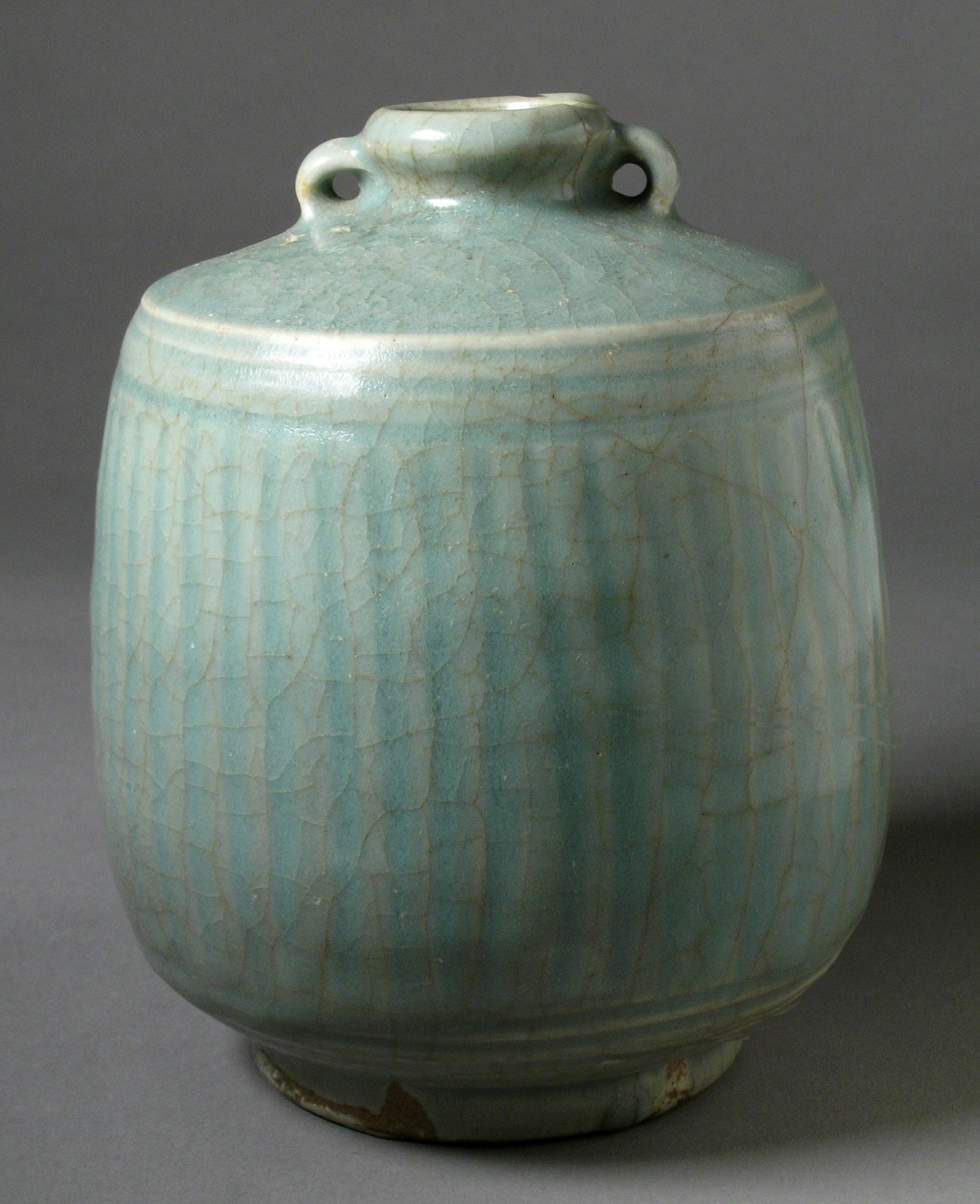
Bottle with two shoulder lugs, Sawankhalok, 15th century
