= Intharachathirat (In) =

King of Ayutthaya from 1409 to 1424

Intharacha อินทราชา
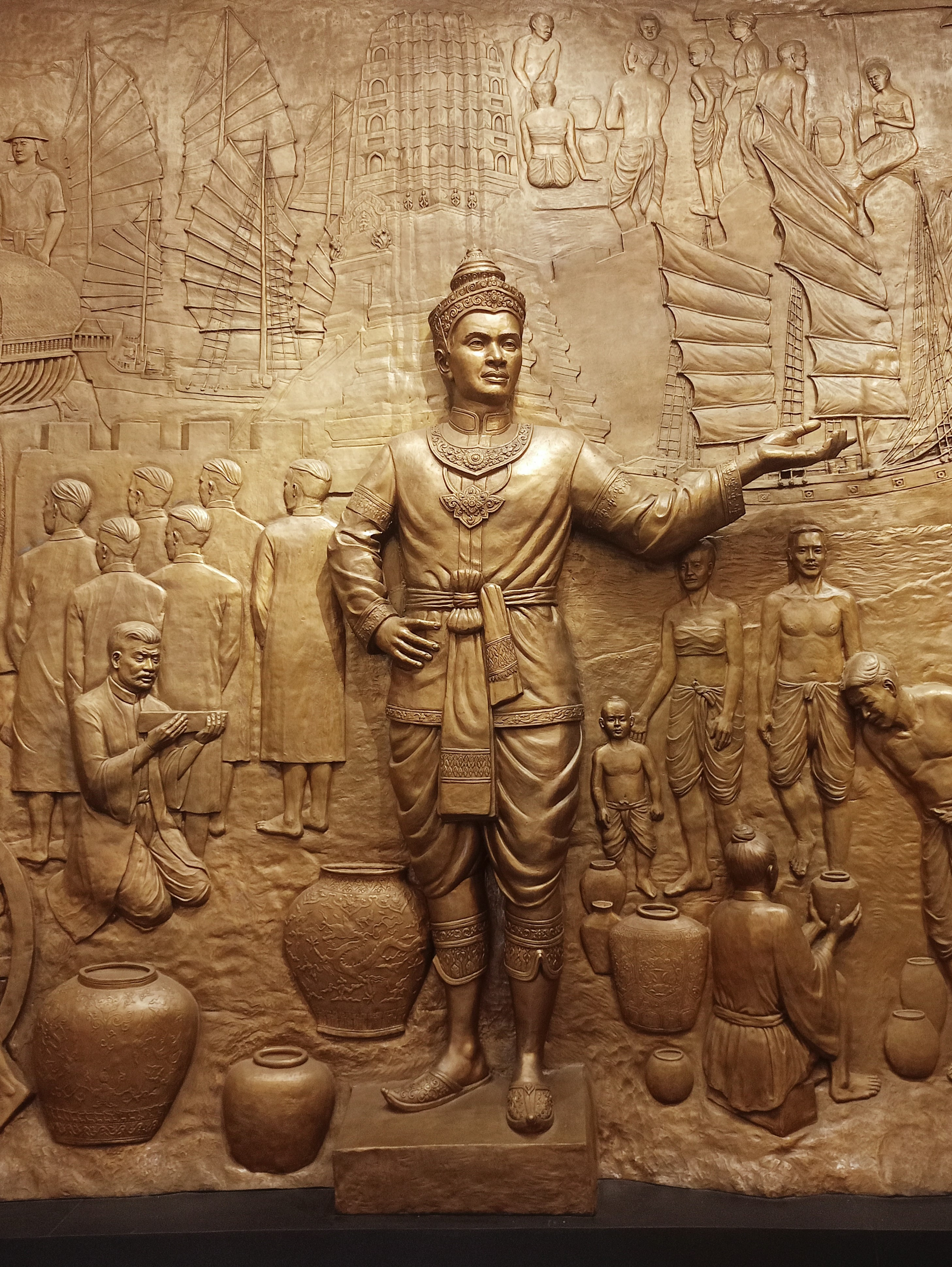
- Relief of King Intharacha

King of Ayutthaya
- Reign: 1409–1424
- Predecessor: Ramrachathirat
- Successor: Borommarachathirat II
- Born: 1359
- Died: 1424 (aged 65)
- Issue: Chao Ai Phraya; Chao Yi Phraya; Chao Sam Phraya (Borommarachathirat II)
- Dynasty: Suphannaphum

Intharacha, also spelled In Racha (Thai: อินทราชา, Indrarājā), also known as King Nakhon In (Thai: เจ้านครอินทร์, RTGS: Chao Nakhon In), was the sixth king of the Ayutthaya Kingdom, reigning from 1409 to 1424. A member of the Suphannaphum Dynasty, he successfully consolidated his dynasty's power and expanded Ayutthaya's influence over the Sukhothai Kingdom.

Intharacha is notably recognized in Chinese records for his strong diplomatic ties with the Ming Dynasty, having personally visited the Chinese court twice. His reign effectively ended a period of political instability within Ayutthaya. Following his death in 1424, a succession struggle between his eldest sons led to the accession of his third son, Borommarachathirat II (Chao Sam Phraya).

== Life ==
Intharacha, originally named Nakhon In, was born in 1359. Jeremias Van Vliet's chronicle states that he was the son of the younger brother of Borommarachathirat I and the elder brother of Thong Lan. His mother was of the Phra Ruang dynasty of the Sukhothai Kingdom.

The Luang Prasert Aksornnit edition of the Royal Chronicles of Ayutthaya states that he ruled Suphan Buri until a conflict arose between King Ramrachathirat and the minister Chao Phraya Maha Senabodi. The minister fled to Suphan Buri to pledge allegiance to Intharacha and invited him to seize the throne of Ayutthaya. When Intharacha arrived, the minister seized the city and invited him to ascend the throne at the age of 50. Ramrachathirat was then sent to rule Phatha Khu Cham instead.

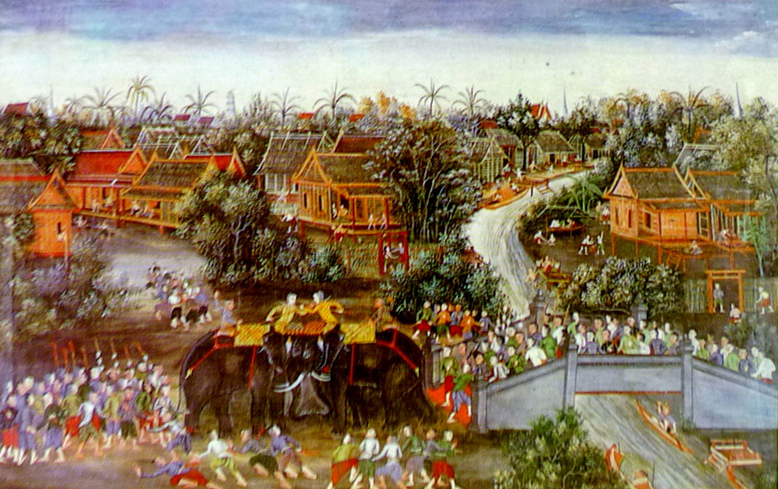
Chao Ai Phraya and Chao Yi Phraya engaging in elephant combat at Pa Than Bridge, which crosses the Pratu Khao Pluak Canal. Both princes died in the battle.

King Intharacha fell ill and died in 1424. The Phan Chantanumat (Choem) chronicle states he reigned for 15 years, while Van Vliet's chronicle records 20 years. Following his death, his two eldest sons, Chao Ai Phraya and Chao Yi Phraya, marched their armies to Ayutthaya to claim the throne. They engaged in elephant combat at Pa Than Bridge, resulting in the death of both princes. Consequently, the third son, Chao Sam Phraya, ascended the throne as King Borommarachathirat II.

== Royal duties ==
=== Administration ===
In 1419, when Maha Thammaracha III of Sukhothai died, turmoil erupted in the Northern Cities due to a succession struggle between Phraya Ban Mueang and Phraya Ram, the sons of Maha Thammaracha III. King Intharacha marched his army to Phra Bang (modern-day Nakhon Sawan). Both Phraya Ban Mueang and Phraya Ram came out to pay homage.

Upon returning to Ayutthaya, the King appointed his sons to rule the Luk Luang (princely) cities:

- Chao Ai Phraya ruled Suphan Buri.
- Chao Yi Phraya ruled Phraek Si Racha (Mueang San, within modern Sankhaburi district, Chai Nat province).
- Chao Sam Phraya ruled Chainat (believed to be Phitsanulok), a major northern frontier city.

Furthermore, he requested a princess of Sukhothai, Phra Ratchathewi, to marry his youngest son, Chao Sam Phraya. Their union later produced King Borommatrailokkanat.

=== Foreign relations ===
Nakhon In visited Nanjing, China, twice—once in 1371 and again in 1377—while he was still the heir of Suphan Buri, during the reign of the Hongwu Emperor of the Ming dynasty.

The Jianwen Emperor of the Ming dynasty maintained close relations with him, praising him as the only king to have personally visited the Chinese imperial court. Chinese records refer to him as "Jiao Lu Qun Ying" (Chinese transcription of Chao Nakhon In).

After ascending the throne following the conflict with Ramrachathirat, Intharacha and the Chinese emperor exchanged envoys multiple times to strengthen diplomatic ties. Chinese chronicles refer to him after his accession as "Jiao Lu Qun Ying Dao Luo Ti La," derived from the title Chao Nakhon Intharathirat.

== Legacy ==
The reign of King Intharacha left a profound impact on the long-term stability and regional dominance of the Ayutthaya Kingdom. His primary legacy lies in the decisive consolidation of power for the Suphannaphum Dynasty, effectively ending the political rivalry with the Uthong Dynasty and initiating a long period of dynastic stability. Economically, he leveraged his exceptional personal rapport with the Ming imperial court to elevate Ayutthaya into a premier maritime trading hub, ushering in an era of immense wealth through the tributary system. Furthermore, his strategic expansion of influence over the Sukhothai Kingdom. The cultural and artistic sophistication of his era is most visibly preserved in the architecture and the vast treasures of Wat Ratchaburana, which serve as a testament to the kingdom's prosperity and the flourishing of early Ayutthaya art.

Intharachathirat (In) House of Suphannaphum Born: 1359 Died: 1424
Regnal titles
Preceded by Ramrachathirat	King of Ayutthaya; 1409–1424	Succeeded by Borommarachathirat II
Preceded by Sri Thephahurat	Ruler of Suphannabhum; 1374–1408	Succeeded by Chao Ai Phraya
