= Chatrapathy =

Chatrapathi or Chatrapathy may refer to:

- Chhatrapati, Indian royal title
  - Shivaji, a Maratha sovereign who founded the Maratha Empire
- Chatrapathy (2004 film), a Tamil film starring Sarath Kumar and Nikita Thukral
- Chatrapathi (2005 film), a Telugu film directed by S. S. Rajamouli and starring Prabhas and Shriya Saran
- Chatrapathi (2013 film), a Kannada film directed by Dinesh Gandhi and starring Siddarth and Priyadarshini
- Chatrapathi (2023 film), a Hindi-language film directed by V. V. Vinayak
