= Dharmarājādhvarīndra =

Hindu philosopher

Dharmarājādhvarīndra is a South Indian sixteenth century Hindu philosopher which deals with Vedanta epistemology. He is born in Kandaramanickam, Tamil Nadu, India. He contributed to the Advaita theory of knowledge. Up to this point metaphysics and epistemology were treated as one in Indian philosophy.

He is the author of Vedānta Paribhāṣā (वेदान्त परिभाषा), a very important manual of the Vedanta philosophy, and is one of the most widely read book on the subject of Advaita Vedanta.
