= Maha Thammaracha II =

King of Sukhothai (1368–1399)

Lue Thai ลือไทย
- Phra Maha Thammaracha II

King of Sukhothai
- Reign: 1368 - 1399
- Predecessor: Li Thai (Maha Thammaracha I)
- Successor: Sai Lu Thai (Maha Thammaracha III)
- Born: 1358; Sukhothai Kingdom
- Died: 1399 (aged 40–41); Sukhothai Kingdom
- Issue: Sai Lue Thai (Maha Thammaracha III)
- Dynasty: Phra Ruang
- Father: Li Thai (Maha Thammaracha I)
- Religion: Theravada Buddhism

Maha Thammaracha II (Thai: มหาธรรมราชาที่ ๒, pronounced [mā.hǎː tʰām.mā.rāː.t͡ɕʰāː tʰîː sɔ̌ːŋ]), born as Lue Thai (Thai: ลือไทย, pronounced [lɯ̄ː tʰāj]), was a king of the Sukhothai Kingdom, a historical kingdom of Thailand.

== Ancestry ==
Ancestors of Maha Thammaracha II

8. King Ram Khamhaeng of Sukhothai
4. King Loe Thai of Sukhothai
2. King Maha Thammaracha I of Sukhothai
1. King Maha Thammaracha II of Sukhothai
3. Si Thammaratchamada

Maha Thammaracha II Phra Ruang Dynasty Born: ? Died: 1399
Regnal titles
Preceded by Maha Thammaracha I	King of Sukhothai (after 1378 as vassal king); 1368–1399	Succeeded by Maha Thammaracha III
