= Sawankhalok district =

Sawankhalok สวรรคโลก
- District
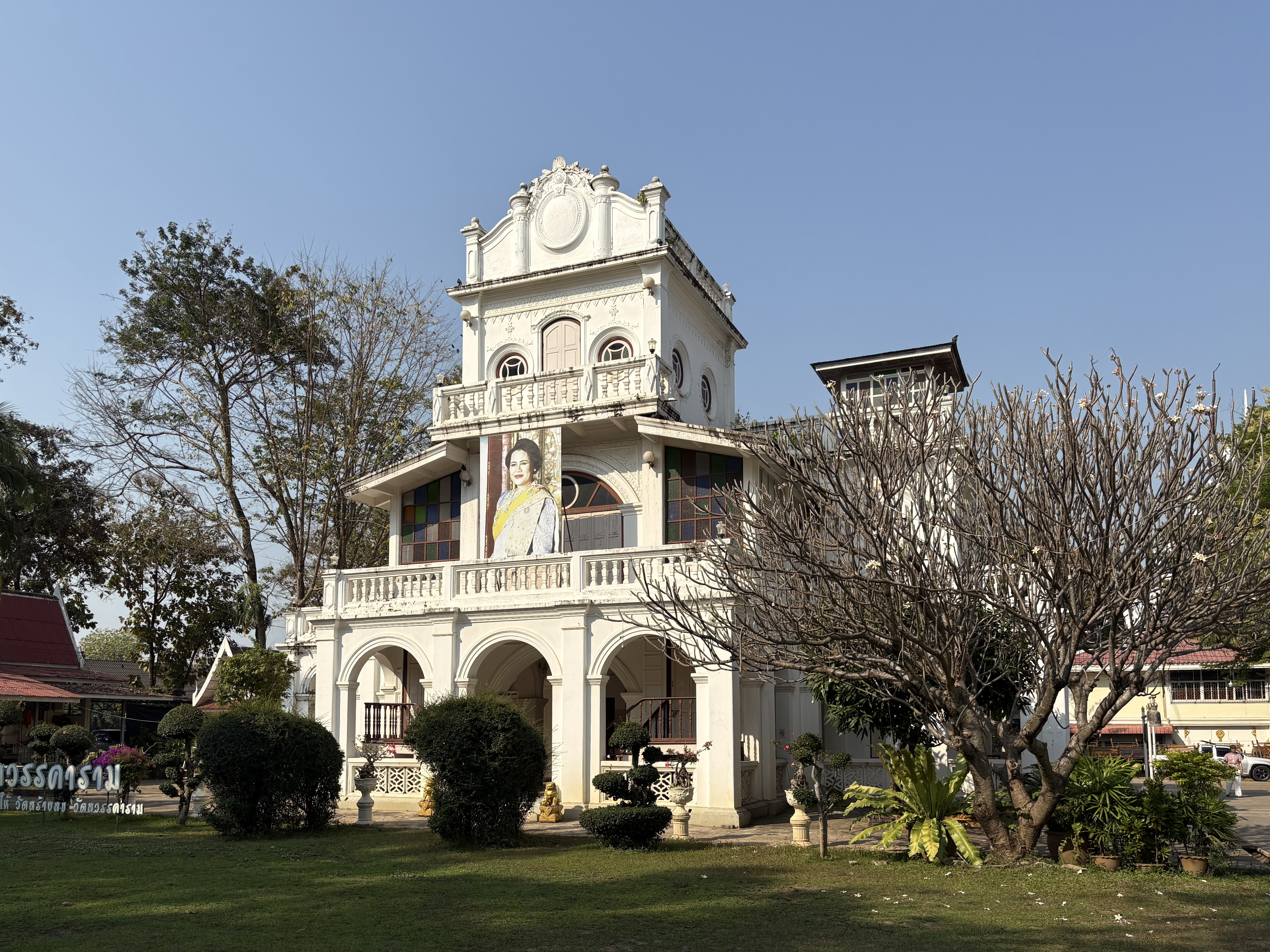
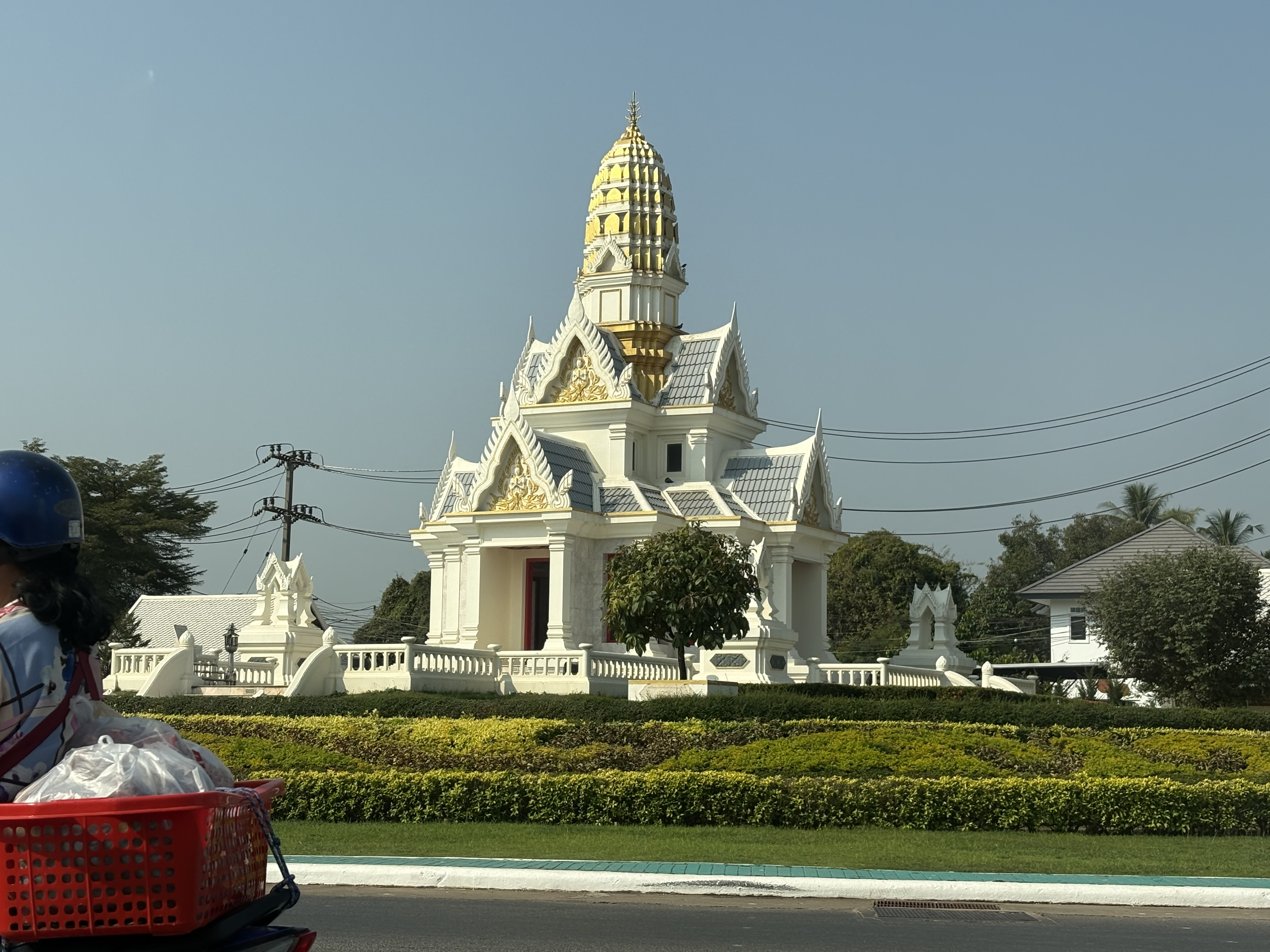
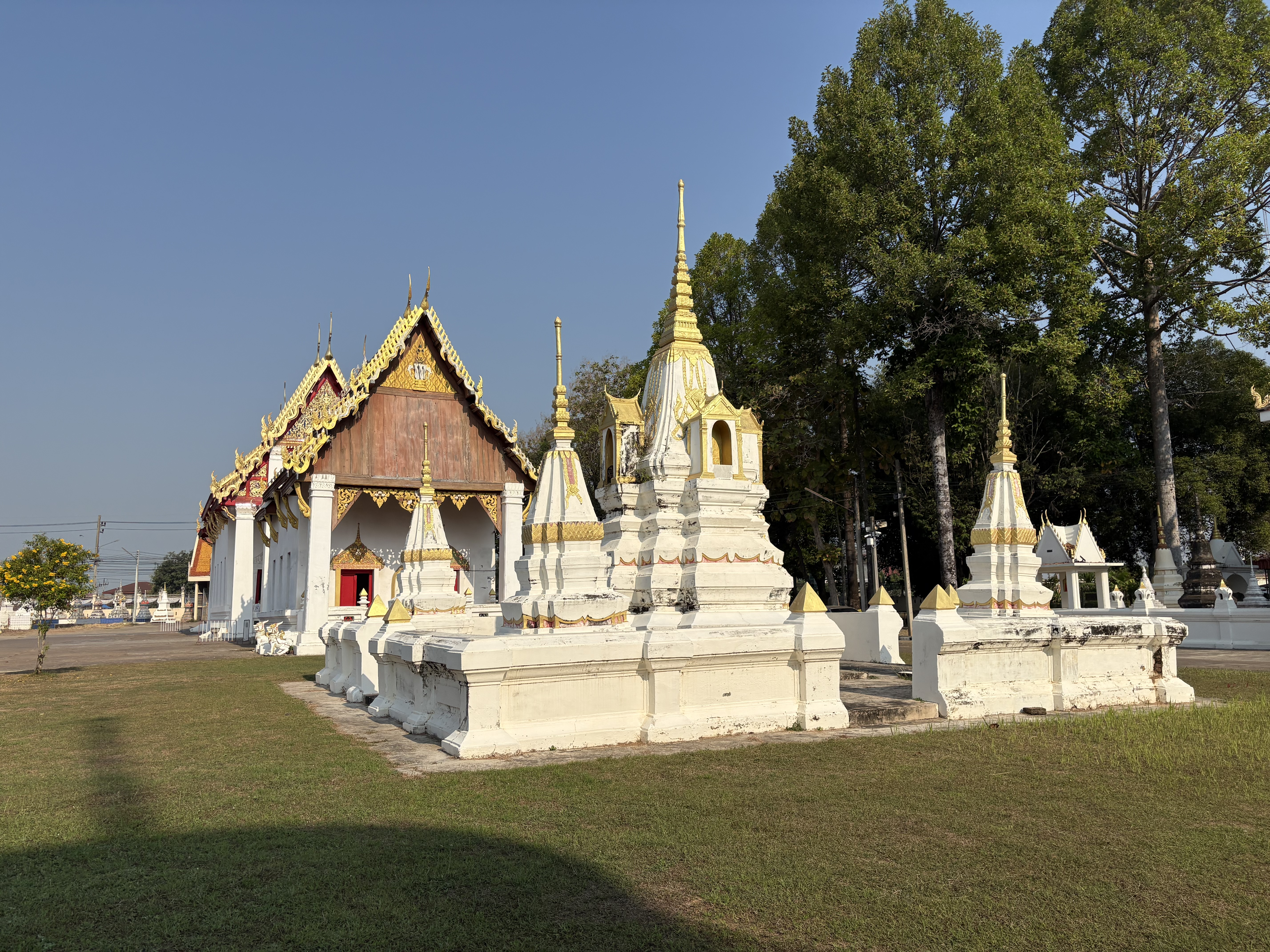
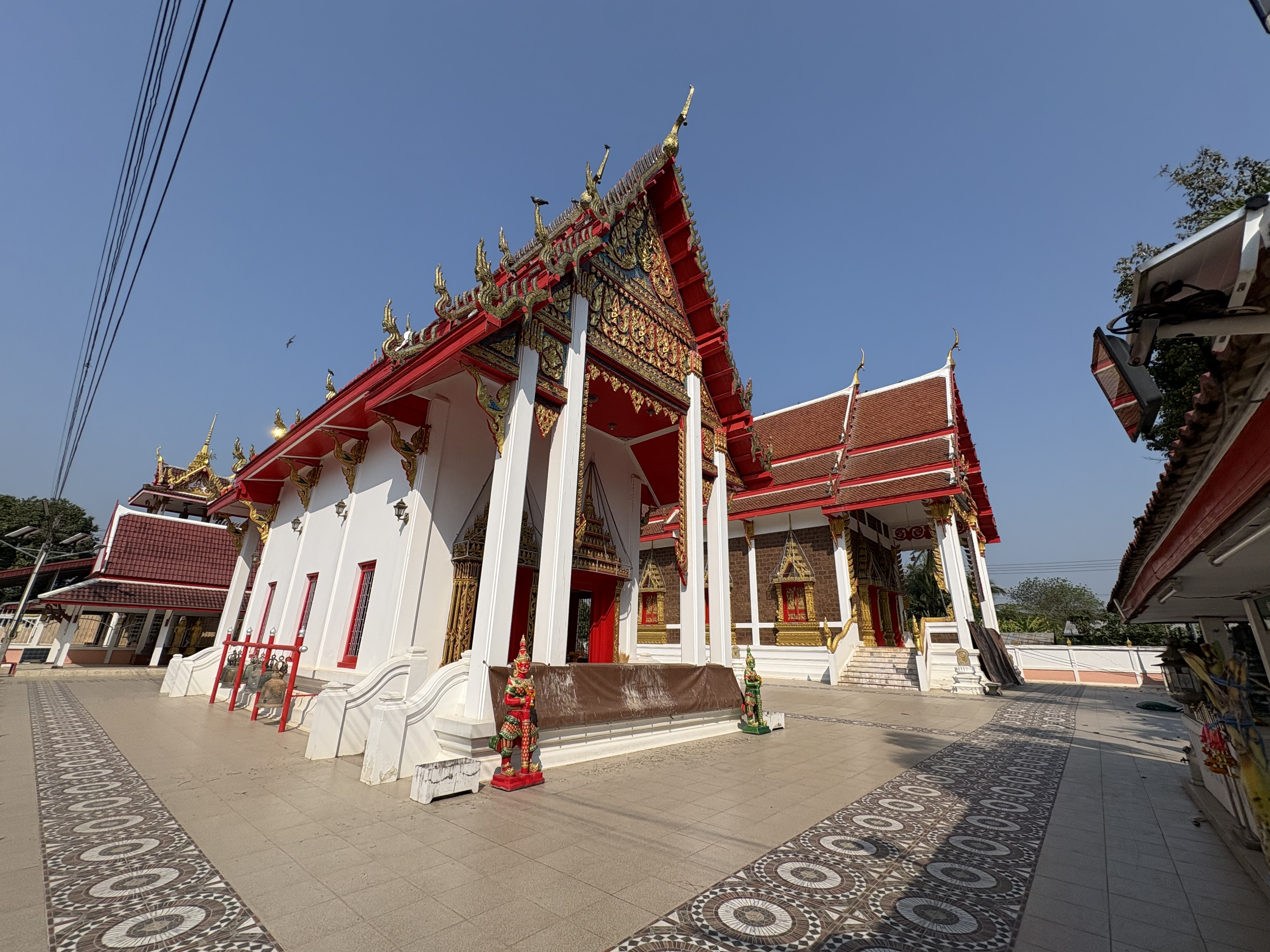
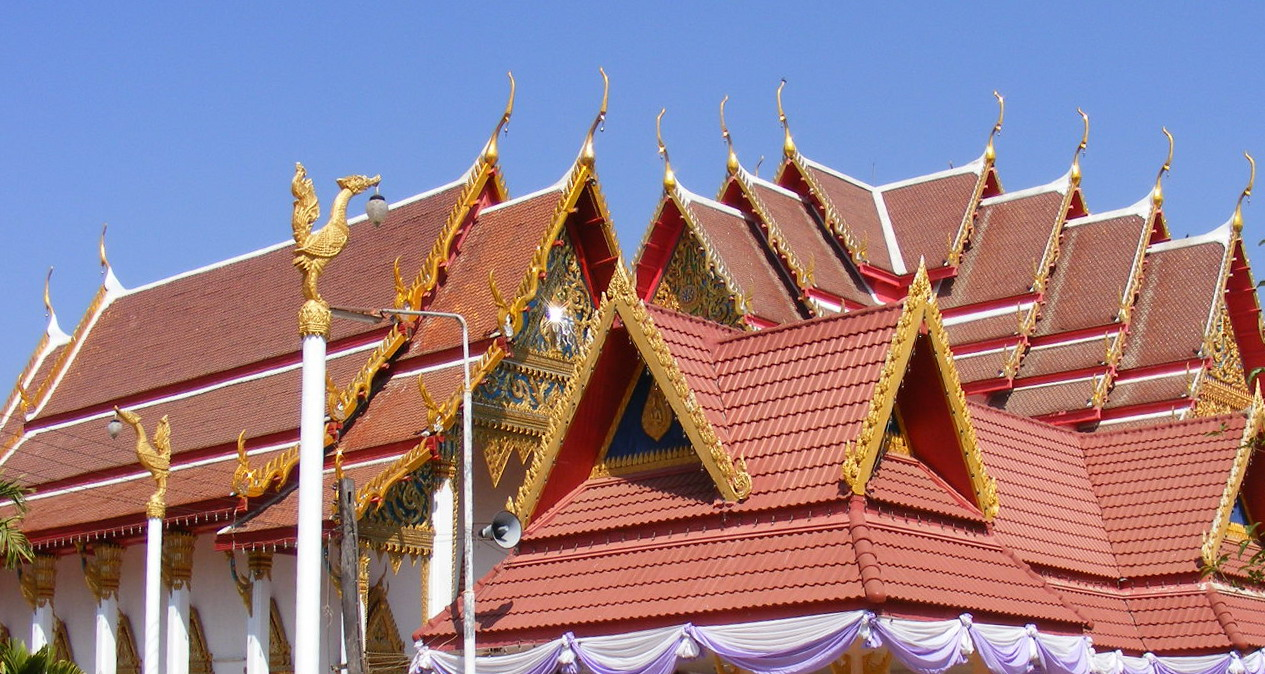
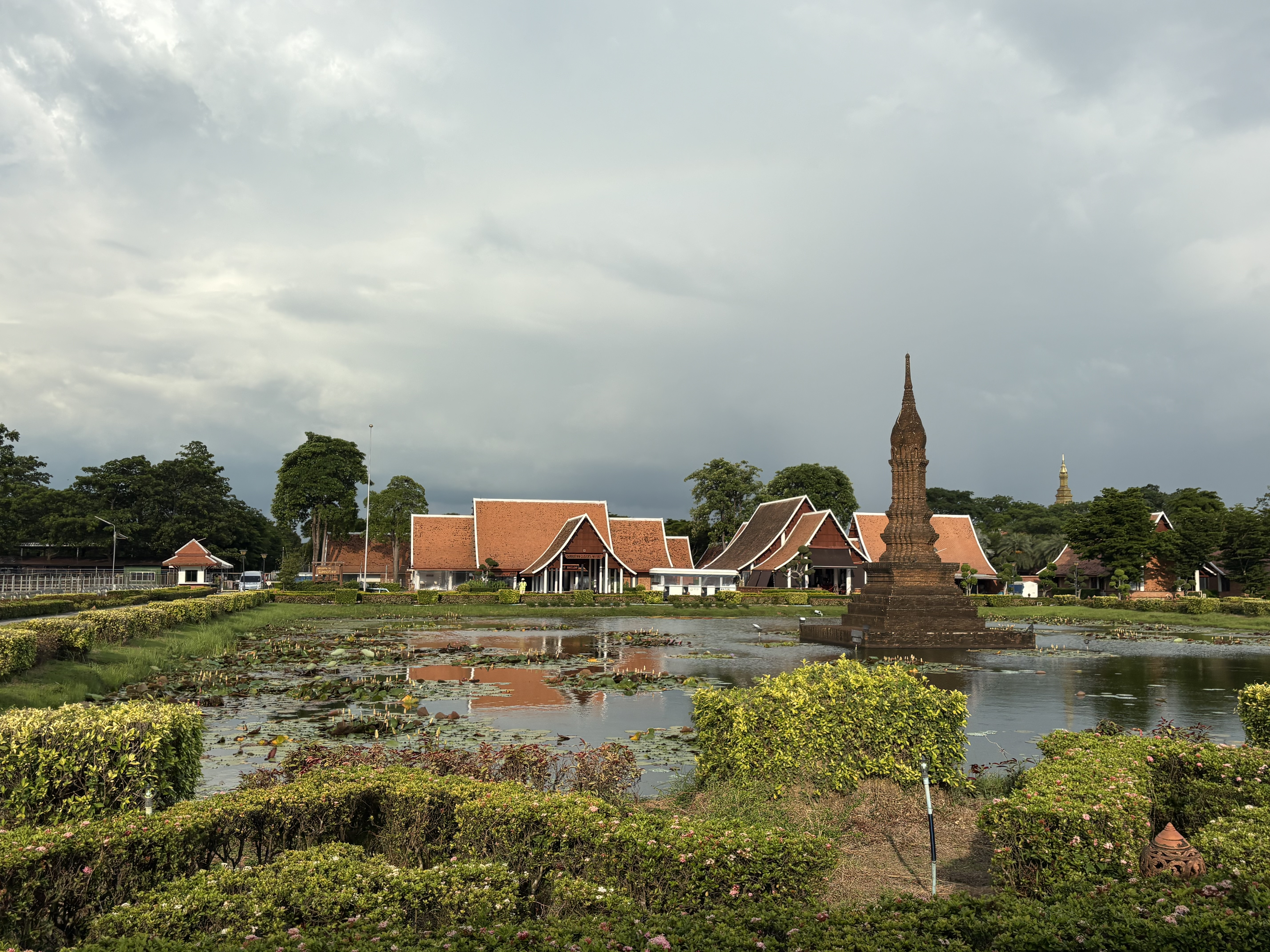
- Wat Sawankharam Sawankhalok City Pillar Shrine Wat Sawang Arom Worawihan Wat Khlong Krachong Wat Nong Wong Sukhothai Airport

- District location in Sukhothai province
- Coordinates: 17°19′0″N 99°49′54″E
- Country: Thailand
- Province: Sukhothai
- Seat: Mueang Sawankhalok

Area
  - Total: 586.192 km^{2} (226.330 sq mi)

Population (2008)
  - Total: 87,735
  - Density: 151.7/km^{2} (393/sq mi)
- Time zone: UTC+7 (ICT)
- Postal code: 64110
- Geocode: 6407

Sawankhalok (Thai: สวรรคโลก, pronounced [sā.wǎn.kʰā.lôːk]) is a district (amphoe) in the northern part of Sukhothai province, in the lower north of Thailand.

== Geography ==
Neighboring districts are (from the south clockwise) Si Samrong, Thung Saliam, Si Satchanalai, Si Nakhon of Sukhothai Province, Phichai of Uttaradit province and Phrom Phiram of Phitsanulok province.

== History ==
The district was originally the capital district of Sawankhalok Province, which in 1932 was merged with Sukhothai Province. The new province was at first named Sawankhalok, but in 1939 was renamed Sukhothai and its capital district moved to Sukhothai district.

In 1917, the district was renamed from Mueang (เมือง) to Wang Mai Khon (วังไม้ขอน). In 1938 it was named Mueang Sawankhalok (เมืองสวรรคโลก), which was changed to Sawankhalok in 1939 following the provincial renaming.

In the 14th–16th centuries the area was a center of ceramics manufacture, Sangkhalok ceramic ware being its best-known example. Chusak Satienpattanodom notes that the name Sawankhalok appears in no Sukhothai inscription, and takes it for an Ayutthaya-period usage. Two derivations stand in his work without being decided between: one from an Old Mon word for a pit kiln, giving sangkhalok and then Sawankhalok, and one in the opposite direction. Under Ayutthaya the town ranked as one of six second-class provinces. He reads Naresuan's removal of the northern towns' population in 1584 as the end of the industry, leaving the old city deserted; Luang Cha was appointed to hold the town in 1592 and the revival was partial. Late in the Bangkok period the centre moved downstream to Ban Wang Mai Khon, the site of the modern district town.

== Economy ==
Subdistrict Ban Klong Krachong in Sawankhalok district is the largest producer of fresh banana leaves in Thailand. More than 50% of Sukhothai's 14,215 rai of banana plantations are in Ban Klong Krachong. The banana leaf industry generated about 179 million baht for the community in 2018. Banana leaves are used for wrapping foodstuffs and crafts such as fashioning krathong. Sawankholok farmers grow kluay tani bananas (Musa balbisiana). The fruit of this wild species of banana is not eaten as it is full of seeds. But the leaves of kluay tani (กล้วยตานี) are prized for their large size and toughness. In 2018, 40 local banana leaf farmers formed a group, Klum Kasettakon Plaeng Yai, to produce biodegradable banana leaf tableware: plates and bowls initially. Although the initiative is in its early stages, the group have already received orders from Thailand and abroad.

== Administration ==
The district is divided into 14 sub-districts (tambons), which are further subdivided into 143 villages (mubans). Suwankhalok is a town (thesaban mueang) and covers tambon Mueang Suwankhalok. There are a further 13 tambon administrative organizations (TAO).

No.	Name	Thai	Villages	Pop.
1.	Mueang Sawankhalok	เมืองสวรรคโลก	9	18,051
2.	Nai Mueang	ในเมือง	14	8,327
3.	Khlong Krachong	คลองกระจง	9	5,092
4.	Wang Phinphat	วังพิณพาทย์	4	804
5.	Wang Mai Khon	วังไม้ขอน	11	1,778
6.	Yan Yao	ย่านยาว	12	8,767
7.	Na Thung	นาทุ่ง	12	5,307
8.	Khlong Yang	คลองยาง	12	7,139
9.	Mueang Bang Yom	เมืองบางยม	5	2,921
10.	Tha Thong	ท่าทอง	8	3,668
11.	Pak Nam	ปากน้ำ	12	6,982
12.	Pa Kum Ko	ป่ากุมเกาะ	14	7,991
13.	Mueang Bang Khlang	เมืองบางขลัง	13	5,038
14.	Nong Klap	หนองกลับ	8	5,870
