= Maha Thammaracha III =

King of Sukhothai from 1400 to 1419

Maha Thammaracha III มหาธรรมราชาที่ ๓
- King of Sukhothai

King of Sukhothai
- Reign: 1400–1419
- Predecessor: Lue Thai
- Successor: Borommapan
- Born: c. 1380
- Died: 1419
- Issue: Borommapan; Phaya Ram
Names
- Phra Maha Thammaracha III
- Dynasty: Phra Ruang
- Father: Luethai

Maha Thammaracha III (Thai: มหาธรรมราชาที่ ๓, pronounced [mā.hǎː tʰām.mā.rāː.t͡ɕʰāː tʰîː sǎːm]), born as Sai Luthai (Thai: ไสลือไทย, pronounced [sǎj lɯ̄ː tʰāj]) (c. 1380–1419), was a king of the Sukhothai Kingdom. He was the son of Maha Thammaracha II and great-great grandson of King Ram Khamhaeng the Great.

== Early life and family ==
Much of the information of Maha Thammaracha III comes from stone inscriptions written by his mother in his name. His mother, who called herself "Saṃtec Braḥ Rājadebī Srī Cuḷālakṣana Arrgarājamahesī Debadhòranī Tilakaratana" (Asokārāma stone inscription) or "Saṃtec Braḥ Rājajananī Srī Dharmarājamātā Mahātilakaraṭana Rājanārtha" (stone inscription 46), was the daughter of King Li Thai (Maha Thammaracha I) and married to her brother, Maha Thammaracha II.Sai Luthai had a full brother, a prince named Asoka, of whom no information is known.

== Reign ==
Stone inscription No. 46 describes that the Queen Mother, together with her son "Satṃtec Mahādharrmarājādhipati Śrī Surīyavaṅsa" (Sai Luthai), recaptured Phra Bang (present-day Nakhon Sawan) and Phrae with her army in 762 C.S. (1400 A.D.) and then "enjoyed dominion over the entire land of Sri Satchanalai and Sukhothai". The reconquest of Phra Bang interrupted the transport of goods from Ayutthaya in a north-south direction.

After the death of King Saen Mueang Ma in the northern neighboring kingdom of Lan Na in 1401, Sai Luthai intervened in its succession dispute on the side of the King's eldest son, Thao Yi Kum Kam. He and his army marched into Lan Na. However, after seeing a bad omen, he withdrew, took Yi Kum Kam with him, and left him one of his provinces (possibly Kamphaeng Phet) as an appanage. Lan Na was ruled by Yi Kum Kam's younger brother Sam Fang Kaen.

When King Intharacha ascended the throne of Ayutthaya in 1409, one of his first actions was to reconquer Sukhothai as a vassal state. The exact date is unknown, but stone inscription 49 was written in 1412 by a Nai Inthara Sorasak, who was probably the resident of the king of Ayutthaya, sent to Sukhothai by King Inthara to secure Ayutthaya's interests against his vassal.

After his death in 1419, his throne was passed onto his son, Maha Thammaracha IV.

== See also ==
- Sukhothai kingdom

Maha Thammaracha III Phra Ruang Dynasty Born: ? Died: 1419
Regnal titles
Preceded by Maha Thammaracha II	King of Sukhothai; 1400–1419	Succeeded by Maha Thammaracha IV
