= Pha Mueang =

Pha Mueang ผาเมือง
- Khun of Mueang Rat
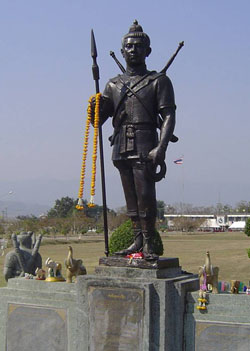
- The Statue of Pho Khun Pha Mueang, Khun Pha Mueang barrack, Phetchabun Province.
- Spouse: Sukhara Mahadevi; Naovarongdevi
- Dynasty: Sri Naw Nam Thum
- Father: Sri Naw Nam Thum

Pha Mueang or Pho Khun Pha Mueang (Thai: พ่อขุนผาเมือง; late 12th century – mid 13th century) was the ruler of Mueang Rat and a son of Sri Naw Nam Thum. He was one of the two commanders of the campaign that took Sukhothai, usually dated to about 1238 though the year is disputed, and so had a part in the founding of the Sukhothai Kingdom. He is known almost entirely from the Wat Si Chum Inscription, a stele of 1357 composed by a kinsman. From the ruler at Angkor he had received a Khmer title, a sword of victory and a princess in marriage. After the campaign he took neither the city nor his own title, installing his ally Bang Klang Hao at Sukhothai and passing the title of Sri Indraditya to him.

Two questions dominate the writing about him. Where Mueang Rat lay is disputed, with proposals in the Pasak valley near Lom Sak, in the Nan valley near Uttaradit, and at the old Khorat site in Sung Noen. How the campaign should be read is also disputed. In one reading the defeated Khom Sabat Khlon Lamphong commanded a Khmer garrison and the episode was the liberation of Sukhothai from Khmer rule; others treat it as a contest between two local lords who both held Khmer honours.

== Origin ==
Pha Mueang was the son of Sri Naw Nam Thum, whom Baker and Pasuk describe as a warrior chief who raided across the upper Chao Phraya basin early in the 13th century. (Note: Betty Gosling gives Pha Mueang instead as a descendant of a Nam Thum whose name appears in the legends of many Tai peoples.) Both men are named in the Wat Si Chum Inscription, Inscription 2, a stele of 1357 composed by Pha Mueang's grandson, which gives Pha Mueang as ruler of a city-state called Mueang Rat (เจ้าเมืองราด). The inscription presents Mueang Rat as a substantial polity rather than a single town, describing Pha Mueang as lord there with a large elephant force and many dependent towns. A re-reading of the inscription by epigraphists in 1980 gives him a second town, Mueang Lum, beside Mueang Rat. Neither town has been located. Michael Vickery, who drew on the same re-reading, found the circumstances in which it was produced partly unconvincing.

The location of Mueang Rat is disputed. One proposal places it in the Pasak valley, and a large statue of Pha Mueang (อนุสาวรีย์พ่อขุนผาเมือง) stands at Lom Sak in Phetchabun province. Alexander Brown Griswold and Prasert na Nagara argue instead from the terrain for the Nan valley, about 50 km up the river from Uttaradit. David K. Wyatt follows them, while stating that the town has never been found. Prasert placed it at Tha Pla, up the Nan from Uttaradit, on a reading of Inscription 8 that takes its list of towns in clockwise order. The list stands in a later addendum, its date effaced, to Lithai's inscription of 1359 on Khao Sumonkut. It names the towns whose men he led to worship the Buddha footprint there after seven years at Phitsanulok. Phiset Jiajanphong argued for Thung Yang in Laplae, about 35 km from Si Satchanalai and 5 km from the river, a proposal Baker and Pasuk follow. He held that this does not compete with Prasert's placement, Thung Yang and Uttaradit lying on one stretch of plain.

A third proposal, put forward by Manit Vallibhotama and followed by Chit Phumisak, places it at the old Khorat site in Sung Noen district, Nakhon Ratchasima province, reading Khorat as a contraction of Nakhon Rat. Chit supported it from the career of Pha Mueang's grandson Sri Sattha, who is recorded as fighting Thao Ji Chan in his late teens. Dong I Chan lies about 70 km south-east of the Sung Noen site, which would make the two territories adjacent. He added that Sri Sattha is said to have been ordained from a place called Rattanabhumi, which he took to be one of Mueang Rat's dependent towns.

Phiset set three conditions before naming a site. The first was some link with Angkor or with Lopburi, which he took from the inscription's account of the marriage, the title and the sword. The second was rank equal to or above Sukhothai at that date. The third was nearness to Sukhothai, since the towns listed beside Mueang Rat in Inscription 8 all fall in the provinces around it. His case for Thung Yang turns on the two names never appearing in the same body of writing. Rat occurs only in Sukhothai's own inscriptions, Thung Yang only in Lan Na and central Thai sources, and the single stone bearing Thung Yang is Inscription 38, which Prasert and M.C. Chand Chirayu Rajani agreed was not Sukhothai work. Phiset read this as one town known by two names, from inside and from outside, while allowing that the name could stand on a lost part of a Sukhothai stone.

== Relations with Angkor ==
The inscription calls the king of Angkor the "God of Sri Mueang Sodharapura", ผีฟ้า, answering to Sanskrit deva raja. (Note: Chit Phumisak offered two readings of ผีฟ้า in this passage, a rendering of deva in Khmer regnal styles or the Thai idiom ผีสาง, used before the name of a person no longer living. He inclined to the second, on the strength of the inscription's phrasing "in former times, Phi Fa lord of…".) That king gave Pha Mueang the title Sri Indraditya, the rank Kamrateng An, and the sword of victory (Preah Khan Chey Srey, Khmer: ព្រះខន្ធជ័យស្រី, Thai: พระขรรค์ชัยศรี), and with them Sukhara Mahadevi, called a daughter of King Jayavarman VII of Yaśodharapura. The rank was not peculiar to him. Chinese records of the same decades give kamrateng to the rulers of Chen Li Fu, Phrip Phri and Sukhothai as well, so that it marks a class of ruler rather than a singular appointment. An oath of loyalty to Angkor was probably required of him as well.

Chit Phumisak cautioned that the sword carries less evidential weight than it appears to. Jayavarman VII prefixed jaya to a great many things, but a sword of the same name remained in Khmer use long afterwards, chaiyasi was a general expression for glorious victory, appearing in the water-oath formula attached to the law on ordeal of 1355, and the object itself may be older than any king of that name. A khan chaiyasi is listed among the Sukhothai regalia in the inscription of Lithai, and the term recurs in Lao literature. Baker and Pasuk record the same three gifts, a Khmer title, a regalia sword and a princess in marriage, but attribute them to the ruler at Angkor without naming him.

Angkorian influence in the region waned after the death of Jayavarman VII in 1220, but that date is itself inferred. Coedès took it from the Nakhon Chum inscription of 1357, which records for 1219 a loss of standing by princes, brahmans and merchants but names no king; Wyatt notes that Jayavarman's own inscriptions extend barely past 1200, and that Pierre Lamant reads the reign as defensive rather than expansive. Two dated inscriptions fall in the same year, the Wat Bang Sanuk inscription in Phrae of 28 March 1219 and the Vat Don inscription at Lamphun of 28 May. Modern reconstructions place the southward push of Sri Naw Nam Thum and Pha Mueang in that year as well. Wyatt, who knows the three attested items, remarks that something of major significance must have happened in 1219.

== Campaign against Sukhothai ==
Bang Klang Hao (full name Pho Khun Bang Klang Hao, พ่อขุนบางกลางหาว) ruled the city-state of Mueang Bang Yang (เจ้าเมืองบางยาง). He was Pha Mueang's brother-in-law, having married Pha Mueang's sister Nang Sueang, a daughter of Sri Naw Nam Thum. Where Mueang Bang Yang lay is not agreed. It has been placed in the present-day Nakhon Thai district, where Pra Poa Noome Thele Seri had earlier been based, while Griswold and Prasert put it either between Mueang Rat and Si Satchanalai or at Ban Yang, about seven kilometres south of New Sukhothai. Wyatt quotes them calling both of their own placements no more than guesses.

Chit read an earlier move by Pha Mueang's father Sri Naw Nam Thum as a first attempt that failed, the city holding out, and dated the point at which Mueang Rat ceased to answer to any outside power to about 1220, on the ground that it could commit its whole levy to the campaign. Baker and Pasuk give that earlier episode differently, having Sri Naw Nam Thum take Sukhothai by an elephant duel with a Mon and hold it together with Si Satchanalai, where he built a large stupa, before losing both towns.

The inscription places the campaign itself at some point probably around 1238–1240. Pha Mueang and Bang Klang Hao marched on Sukhothai, then held by Khom Sabat Khlon Lamphong (ขอมสบาดโขลญลำพง), whose name incorporates a Khmer-style title. The inscription sets the campaign out in stages. Bang Klang Hao first asked for the levies of Mueang Rat, after which the two moved by separate routes, Bang Klang Hao taking Si Satchanalai while Pha Mueang advanced by way of Bang Khlong, whose ruler submitted and handed the town over, and then brought up the levies of Mueang Rat and Mueang Sa Kot.

Chit read the inscription as describing a counter-attack by Khlon Lamphong to retake Si Satchanalai, after which the two allies mustered, performed a rite riding a single elephant's neck together, and caught him between them. In the ensuing battle at the gates of the city, Bang Klang Hao fought against Khom Sabat Khlon Lamphong, both from the back of their war elephants, and "The bold Klon Lamphong was completely defeated". Chit read the phrase describing the outcome as ไพร่พง rather than ไพร่พัง, giving the sense that Khlon Lamphong fled into the forest rather than that his force was broken.

=== Aftermath and later life ===
After the victory, Pha Mueang entrusted the government of Sukhothai to Bang Klang Hao. He then retired with his men to Si Satchanalai; on Chit's reading of the inscription, Bang Klang Hao would not enter the city until Pha Mueang had withdrawn his troops from it. In the 1980 re-reading Pha Mueang "resided" in Si Satchanalai; the older reading left his connection with the town unclear.

A little later Pha Mueang consecrated Bang Klang Hao as "Chao Mueang Sukhothai" (ruler of Sukhothai, เจ้าเมืองสุโขทัย), transferring to him his own title of Sri Indraditya. With it went the sword of victory, which served both as a mark of the victory and as the new kingdom's palladium. Sri Indraditya stands at the head of the Phra Ruang dynasty of the Sukhothai Kingdom. Chit observed that the account survives only because the Wat Si Chum inscription was composed by Pha Mueang's grandson. The part Pha Mueang played was well enough known at Sukhothai that the house of Sri Indraditya had to concede it, while Ram Khamhaeng's own inscription passes over it in silence.

The inscription also covers his later years, spent at Mueang Rat. It has him build cetiya, give alms to religious in large quantity, and stand as teacher and protector of many rulers. Wyatt reads this as the strain of Buddhist piety on the Mueang Rat side of Sukhothai's ancestry, and describes the monk who composed the stele as Pha Mueang's nephew rather than his grandson. Wyatt's wider argument turns on what such acts were held to show. Relics were believed to resist the unworthy, so that a ruler who handled one, enshrined it or gave it away was demonstrating the merit that entitled him to rule; on that reading the sword, the oath and the relic belong to a single account of how legitimacy was made in the 13th century.

Chusak Satienpattanodom reads the decades after the campaign as leaving two realms. On his account, Si Satchanalai stayed with Pha Mueang's line, together with Mueang Rat and Song Khwae (modern Phitsanulok), which was held by Phaya Khamhaeng Phra Ram, whom he takes for Pha Mueang's younger brother. He has the town return to the Sukhothai ruler only in 1283, after Pha Mueang's death, when Ram Khamhaeng annexed it; the date comes from the preface of the Chindamani, a manual of the 17th century, and not from an inscription.

=== The transfer of Sukhothai ===
Why Pha Mueang gave away the conquest has long been discussed. Both explanations offered for it assume that Pha Mueang had sworn an oath to a ruler at Angkor. Griswold and Prasert suggested that the oath lapsed with the death of the ruler who received it. Wyatt objects that this does not account for the transfer, and reads the oath as still in force, so that by handing the city and the title to an ally who had sworn none Pha Mueang avoided the consequences of breaking it. The same reasoning gives Wyatt a later date. Bang Klang Hao was the father of Ram Khamhaeng, who was reigning in the 1290s, so the campaign belongs about 1243 rather than 1220, and the overlord was Indravarman II rather than Jayavarman VII.

=== Historiography ===
How the campaign should be read has changed. In the reading of Griswold and Prasert, Khom Sabat Khlon Lamphong was the commander of a Khmer garrison holding the city, which implied a prior military occupation, and the campaign against him was the liberation of the city from Khmer suzerainty and the founding of an independent kingdom under a Tai dynasty. Baker and Pasuk argue that the ethnic framing and the idea of liberation were both imported from a later era, and read the inscription instead as recording a victory by one local lord associated with Angkor over another warrior holding a Khmer title. They place Pha Mueang among the local chiefs of the period who drew legitimacy from association with Angkor, and compare the founding of Lan Xang, where a local chief travelled to the dominant power Indaprasthanagara, returned with a princess from its ruling court as his wife and subdued the chiefs around him. Wyatt in 2001 kept the reading of the episode as a break with Angkor but had already set the ethnic framing aside, holding that the line between the two sides was religious and cultural and that the two men were acting on home ground rather than as invaders. He also found the timing unexplained, on his own premise that Angkor held the region. The grievances he takes the Ram Khamhaeng inscription to list would have held over a long period, and a weakening Angkor would on that premise predict similar risings at other moments, such as after the Cham sack of 1177, which did not follow. What the epigraphy attests bears on the premise. For the reign of Jayavarman VII, 1181 to 1218, Baker and Pasuk report that the Chao Phraya plain has yielded no temple-endowment inscriptions of the Angkorian provincial type, and that his hospital foundations reach no further west than Prachin Buri in eastern Thailand. Wyatt's own survey of the sixteen dated inscriptions of 1168 to 1219 gives the same result for the two places it covers in the west, Lopburi and Grahi, neither of which shows any indication of Angkorian political or administrative power; he adds that the absence is not conclusive. Neither survey reaches the upper Yom and Nan, where Mueang Rat and Sukhothai lie.

== Consorts ==
- Sukhara Mahadevi, called a daughter of Jayavarman VII and raised to queen consort.
- Naovarongdevi, whom he is said to have married before Sukhara Mahadevi, in the local tradition of Lom Kao district, Phetchabun province.

== In Media ==
- Nang Sueang, a Thai television drama of 1992, in which he was played by Sirakupt Methani.
- Phra Ruang Rise of the Empire, a 2025 film, in which he was played by Pongsakorn Mettarikanon.
