= Ngua Nam Thum =

Ngua Nam Thum งั่วนำถุม

King of Sukhothai
- Reign: 1866 BE (1323/24 CE) – 1890 BE (1347/48 CE)
- Predecessor: Loe Thai
- Successor: Li Thai
- Died: 1890 BE (1347/48 CE)
- House: Phra Ruang
- Father: Ban Mueang

Ngua Nam Thum (Thai: งั่วนำถุม, pronounced [ŋûa̯ nām tʰǔm]) was a king of Sukhothai, an ancient kingdom in Thailand. He was from the House of Phra Ruang.

Preceded by Loe Thai, he possibly ascended the throne of Sukhothai in 1866 BE (1323/24 CE). He reigned until his death, which possibly took place in 1890 BE (1347/48 CE). Upon his death, he was succeeded by Mahathammaracha I (Li Thai).

== Name ==
List of abbreviations used
Abbreviation	For
BE	Buddhist Era
CE	Common Era

Ngua Nam Thum (archaic Thai: งววนำถํ; modern Thai: งั่วนำถุม; IPA: [ŋûːa.nam.tʰǔm]) is the name that appears in the Pu Khun Chit Khun Chot Inscription (Inscription No. 45), created in 1935 BE (1392/93 CE).

The name, which means "Nam Thum the Fifth Son", indicates that he was the fifth son. Ngua (Thai: งั่ว) is an archaic title given to a fifth son. Nam Thum (Thai: นำถุม) is from either a Northern Thai subdialect or the Shan language, corresponding to nam thuam (Thai: น้ำท่วม; IPA: [náːm.thûːam]) in Central Thai, meaning "inundation".

There are several suggestions about the origin of the name:

- Prasoet Na Nakhon, a Royal Society fellow in the field of history, suggested that Ngua Nam Thum was possibly a descendant of King Si Nao Nam Thum of Sukhothai, owing to the ancient custom of naming a baby after its ancestor. This possibility also gives rise to a suggestion that Sueang, Ngua Nam Thum's paternal grandmother, was a daughter of Si Nao Nam Thum.
- Wina Rotchanaratha (วีณา โรจนราธา), an expert from the Fine Arts Department, expressed the opinion that he got this name possibly because he was killed in a flood or died from drowning. Wina cited Jinakalamali which refers to a Sukhothai king in Pali as Udakajotthata, meaning the "drowned king", and the Chronicle of the North which says a Sukhothai king went to take a bath in the Yom River at the Grand Mire (แก่งหลวง; now the location of the Si Satchanalai Historical Park) and was carried away by a flood and never seen again. She said the two documents may refer to Ngua Nam Thum, but this cannot yet be confirmed due to conflicting genealogical and chronological details. She also introduced another possibility that he obtained the name because he was born during a flooding season. She cited an example in the Chronicle of Chiang Mai, which says a grandson of King Mangrai was called Pho-thao Nam Thuam (Thai: พ่อท้าวน้ำท่วม; IPA: [pʰɔ̂ː.tʰáːw.náːm.tʰûːam]; "Prince Inundation") because he was born when the kingdom was undergoing a deluge.

== Life ==
A historical document, Jinakalamali, says Ngua Nam Thum was a son of Ban Mueang, a king of Sukhothai.

The Pu Khun Chit Khun Chot Inscription, which describes the lineage of the House of Phra Ruang, lists Ngua Nam Thum after Loe Thai and before Mahathammaracha I (Li Thai). Historians therefore suggested that he was king of Sukhothai after Loe Thai and before Li Thai. Loe Thai was a son of Ram Khamhaeng, the younger brother of Ngua Nam Thum's father, whilst Li Thai was a son of Loe Thai.

The year of Ngua Nam Thum's accession to the throne is possibly 1866 BE (1323/24 CE), according to the calculation of Prasoet Na Nakhon.

It appears from historical sources that Ngua Nam Thum, after becoming king of Sukhothai, appointed Li Thai as uparaja of Sukhothai (heir to the throne of Sukhothai and ex officio ruler of Si Satchanalai). The Wat Pa Mamuang Inscriptions (Inscriptions Nos. 4–5) say Li Thai had ruled Si Satchanalai for a total of 22 years before entering the monkhood in 1905 BE (1362/63 CE). The year Li Thai was appointed uparaja is therefore 1883 BE (1340/41 CE).

The Wat Pa Mamuang Inscriptions also say that, in 1890 BE (1347/48 CE), Li Thai marched his men from Si Satchanalai to the capital Sukhothai and broke into the palace where he "killed all his enemies" before assuming the throne of Sukhothai. Prasoet Na Nakhon suggested that Ngua Nam Thum died in that year and would be succeeded to the throne by his son, then Li Thai staged a coup and took the throne for himself.

== Bibliography ==
- Na Nakhon, Prasoet (2006). Prawattisat Bettalet ประวัติศาสตร์เบ็ดเตล็ด [Historical Miscellanea] (in Thai). Bangkok: Matichon. ISBN 9743236007.
- Princess Maha Chakri Sirindhorn Foundation (2011). Namanukrom Phramahakasat Thai นามานุกรมพระมหากษัตริย์ไทย [Directory of Thai Kings] (in Thai). Bangkok: Princess Maha Chakri Sirindhorn Foundation. ISBN 9786167308258.
- SAC (2006). "Charuek Pu Khun Chit Khun Chot" จารึกปู่ขุนจิดขุนจอด [Pu Khun Chit Khun Chot Inscription]. Thai Inscriptions Database (in Thai). Bangkok: SAC. Archived from the original on 2015-09-24.
- SAC (2006). "Charuek Wat Pa Mamuang (Phasa Khamen)" จารึกวัดป่ามะม่วง (ภาษาเขมร) [Wat Pa Mamuang Inscription (Khmer Version)]. Thai Inscriptions Database (in Thai). Bangkok: SAC.
- Sukhothai Studies Encyclopedia Commission, Sukhothai Studies Centre, Sukhothai Thammathirat Open University (1996). Saranukrom Sukhothaisueksa (Lem Nueng Ko Thueng Po) สารานุกรมสุโขทัยศึกษา (เล่ม ๑ ก–ป) [Sukhothai Studies Encyclopedia (Volume 1: Letters Ko–Po)] (in Thai). Bangkok: Sukhothai Thammathirat Open University. ISBN 9746149369.

Ngua Nam Thum Phra Ruang Dynasty Born: ? Died: 1890 BE (1347/48 CE)
Regnal titles
Preceded by Loe Thai	King of Sukhothai; 1866 BE (1323/24 CE) – 1890 BE (1347/48 CE)	Succeeded by Maha Thammaracha I
