= Sukhothai =

Sukhothai (Thai: สุโขทัย) may refer to:

- Sukhothai Kingdom, kingdom in Thailand, 1238–1483
  - Sukhothai (city), historic capital of the kingdom
  - Sukhothai Historical Park, the ruins of the city
- Sukhothai script, a Brahmic script which originated in the Sukhothai Kingdom
- Sukhothai Province, province in central northern Thailand
  - Mueang Sukhothai District, capital district of the province
  - New Sukhothai or Sukhothai Thani, the town and capital of the province
- Sukhothai F.C., football club based in Sukhothai Province
- Sukhothai Institute of Physical Education Stadium, multi-use stadium, home of the Sukhothai football club
- Sukhothai Thammathirat Open University, public university in Nonthaburi, Thailand
- HTMS Sukhothai, corvette in the Royal Thai Navy
