= Mueang Chaliang =

7th–15th century political entity

Mueang Chaliang เมืองเชลียง (Thai)
- 620s–1474
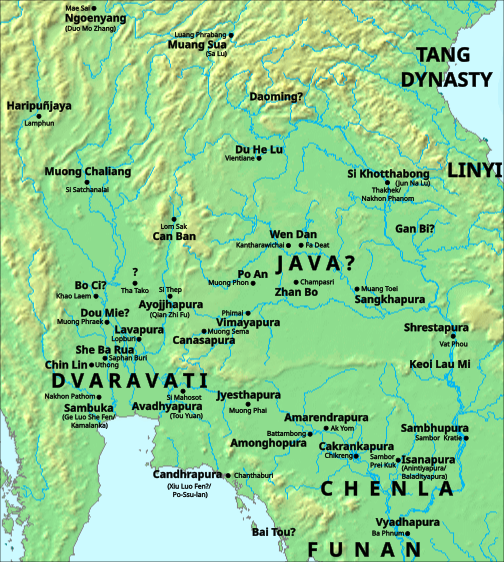
- Proposed locations of ancient polities in the Menam and Mekong Valleys in the 7th century based on the details provided in the Chinese leishu, Cefu Yuangui, and others.
- Capital: Chaliang (before 13th cen.); Walled town, now Si Satchanalai Historical Park (13th c.–1786); Si Satchanalai (1786–1894)
- Monarch
  - 620s: Satchanalai (first)
  - 1157–1182: Sri Naw Nam Thum
- Historical era: Post-classical era
  - Early chiefdoms: Before 620s
  - Tambralinga annexed Lavo: 927/928
  - First mentioned in Chinese source: 1001
  - Established relationship with Tai's Chiang Saen: 1050s
  - Formation of Sukhothai: 1238
  - Vassal of Ayutthaya: 1378–1462
  - Vassal of Lan Na: 1462–1474
  - Incorporated to Lan Na: 1474
  - Burmese rule over Lan Na: 1558–1775
  - Under Siam control: since 1776
  - Demoted to the city under Phitsanulok: 1894
Preceded by
Lavo
Dvaravati
Succeeded by
Mueang Rad
Sukhothai
Lan Na
- Today part of: Thailand

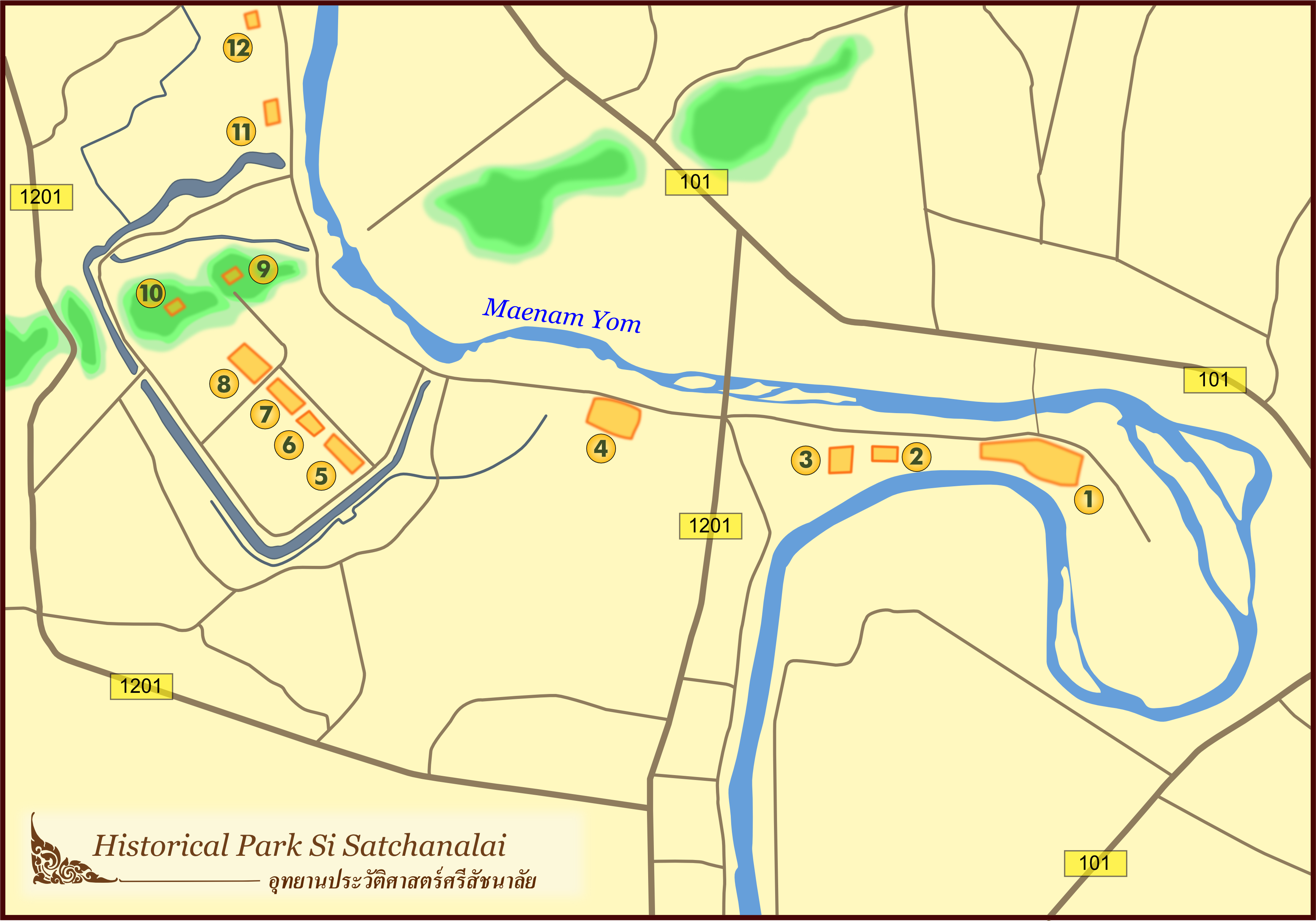
Map of Si Satchanalai Historical Park depicts the sites of "Chaliang" (former capital) located on the bend of the Yom River (number 1) and the moated Si Satchanalai to the left.

Chaliang (Thai: เชลียง, Chinese: 程良) or Sawankhalok was a political entity in the upper Chao Phraya Valley in central Thailand. Whether it was also the Si Satchanalai of the Sukhothai inscriptions is disputed. Chronicle tradition dates its founding to the early 600s, and it lay within the Dvaravati cultural sphere. Chinese sources record it as Chéng Liáng in 1001. In the late 11th and 12th centuries its Mon–Tai rulers held the former Lavo capital at Lavapura for a time.

In the 12th and 13th centuries Tai rulers from the north took Chaliang and then Sukhothai, and after 1238 Chaliang and Sukhothai stood as twin capitals of the Sukhothai Kingdom. Chaliang lost its standing after Sukhothai became a vassal of Ayutthaya, and Lan Na took it in 1462.

== Etymology ==
The English term "Chaliang" is the romanization of the Thai word "เชลียง" per the Royal Thai General System of Transcription. The Thai name has been read as a compound of the Sanskrit chala (Sanskrit: जल), water, and the Old Mon wang, city, giving "city of water"; the Yom River almost surrounds the site. Michael Vickery, however, took the name, written jalya in the inscriptions and jalia in the chronicles, to come from a non-Thai language whose meaning is unknown. He noted the same element in place names south of Sukhothai and north-east of Kamphaeng Phet. The Ayutthaya chronicle of Luang Prasoet writes Salieng, which he took for a Lao or Isan pronunciation of the name. He read the name, with two Mon words for kiln and dish kept in the local ceramic industry, as a sign that the people of that industry were probably Mon.

== History ==
=== Formation ===
The region has been inhabited since the Neolithic and Iron Ages. Agricultural communities formed in the early 4th century and complex societies by about the 9th. Artifacts found in Chaliang-Si Satchanalai show that the communities engaged in trade with several Dvaravati polities, such as Si Mahosot in the southeast, and Mueang Fa Daet Song Yang and Ban Mueang Fai (บ้านเมืองฝ้าย) in northeastern Thailand.

Chusak Satienpattanodom proposes two founding groups from the position of the burials. One, adapted to the floodplain, was buried at Wat Chom Chuen on the bend of the Yom River and influenced from the central plain. The other, adapted to higher ground, was buried at Wat Chang Lom and was possibly moving down from the north. He names no language or people for either. On the same bend, around Wat Phra Si Rattana Mahathat, Paul Bishop and colleagues found the lowest occupation layer, with inhumation burials, earthenware and ash, lying on sterile river sand and gravel. Three samples from it give a pooled radiocarbon age of 1259 ± 28 years BP, uncalibrated. Later levels carry stoneware and no burials, and the authors describe the locality as essentially continuously occupied for at least twelve centuries.

The Fine Arts Department, summarising its own excavations at Wat Chom Chuen, reports eighteen burials cut into sterile soil 50 to 100 cm below the occupation layer. The heads lay roughly west, the postures varied, and almost all the dead were bound at the ankles and knees. Ages at death run from 5 to 35 years, and the department notes an absence of dental caries and teeth filed and polished on the cutting and outer faces. It places the burial ground in the 11th to 16th Buddhist centuries, about the mid-5th to the mid-11th century. Grave goods include cylindrical terracotta bars of a type known from Dvaravati sites such as Mueang Phra Rot and Si Thep, and heat-treated carnelian beads, which the department reads as contact with India through coastal Dvaravati towns. Wesley Clarke's survey of Dvaravati burial sites gives different figures: fifteen burials at Wat Chom Chuen, of the 5th and 6th centuries, and nine at Chaliang, of the 7th to 9th.

According to the Northern Chronicle, Chaliang was founded in the early 600s by a hermit, Satchanalai (สัชนาลัย; or Anusit อนุสิสส in the Tamnan Mulasasana). He united four surrounding chiefdoms and built moats and walls to define the city's boundaries. Its centre was Haritvanlee (นครหริตวัลลีย์). Chaliang's layout served as the model for Haripuñjaya, laid out by the hermit Suthep, which places its foundation before Haripuñjaya's in 629. Its earliest territory reached Thung Yung, also called Wiang Chao Ngo, to the northeast, and Sukhothai to the south.

The tradition places Satchanalai within a group of five hermits, each credited with a part in the founding of early polities in what is now Thailand.

1. Satchanalai, founder of Chaliang, who assisted Suthep at Haripuñjaya.
2. Suthep, founder of Haripuñjaya, who sought the advice of the hermit Sukkatanta (สุกกทันตะ) in Lavo on the choice of its first ruler; Sukkatanta proposed the Lavo princess Camadevi.
3. Sukkatanta, teacher of Camadevi.
4. Phutthachatil (พุทธชฎิล or พุทธชลิต), asked by Camadevi's son Anantayot (เจ้าอนันตยศ) to build him a city; he declined and sent him to Suprom.
5. Suprom (สุพรม, สุพรหมยาน, อสีพรหมสิฤาษี or พรหมิสิ), who founded Lampang for Anantayot.

=== Early Tai city-state ===
From the second half of the first millennium Tai speakers came to dominate the Yom and Nan valleys of what is now northern Thailand, and several independent Tai principalities emerged. Other groups in the area, among them Austroasiatic speakers, were taken captive and Tai-ised over time.

Chaliang was at first subordinate to Mon-ruled Sukhothai, itself a trading centre of the Lavo Kingdom. It opened relations with Tai Chiang Saen to the north in the late 10th century, when a daughter of King Supojarat married its ruler Sri Thammasokkarat, possibly Phrom, and their son was later enthroned at Chaliang. This marked the beginning of Tai influence over the Chao Phraya Valley. In the chronicle traditions that Chris Baker and Pasuk Phongpaichit summarise, one stream of Tai settlement branches south from the Mekong down the Ing River, founds Phayao and then moves on to Chaliang. The Chinese Song Shi, volume 489, records it as an independent polity centred on Chéng Liáng (程良) in the fourth year of the Xián Píng era, 1001. It lay 60 chéng (程) north of Tambralinga and met the Lavo Kingdom to the southeast.

丹眉流國，東至占臘五十程，南至羅越水路十五程，西至西天三十五程，北至程良六十程，東北至羅斛二十五程，

...Tambralinga is 50 chéng (程) from Zhanla in the east, 15 chéng from Luoyue waterway in the south, 35 chéng from Xītiān (西天) in the west, 60 chéng from Chéng Liáng in the north, 25 chéng from Luohu in the northeast...

— History of Song, volume 489

The name San-lo (三濼), which appears in the Lingwai Daida of 1178, and which Lawrence P. Briggs took for an early Chinese rendering of the name of the country or people of the upper and central Menam, was probably Chaliang. The Chinese were soon to call the region Xiān (暹) and Xiānluó (暹羅) in the 13th century. The Chinese dates agree with the archaeology, which shows continuous occupation from the prehistoric period into the Dvaravati period, when the region fell under Lavo influence.

To the southeast, Lavo's Lavapura met a succession of reverses, among them conquest by Tambralinga in 927/928 and nine years of Angkorian civil war, ending in the sack of Lavapura by Suryavarman I in 1002. These may account for the decline of Lavo's hold over the northern polities, Chaliang and Sukhothai among them.

Suphannabhum and Haripuñjaya together took Lavapura from Angkor in 1052 and the capital moved to Ayodhya in the 1080s. The chronicles ascribe the move to Lavo's king, Phra Narai. The seat at Lavapura then stood vacant from 1087 to 1106, until Kraisornrat (ไกรศรราช), king of Chaliang, took it. Chaliang thereby became in effect Lavapura's northern fortress, held by the crown prince. Santi Phakdeekham writes that Angkor moved to recover Lavapura in 1181, when Jayavarman VII appointed his kinsman Narupatidnavarman to govern it. Under that pressure the Tai ruler Sri Thammasokkarat (ศรีธรรมโศกราช), also of Si Satchanalai, withdrew to Nakhon Si Thammarat. Lavapura was probably taken in the 13th century by a Tai prince from Phraek Si Racha (แพรกศรีราชา, present-day Sankhaburi). The Mon–Tai house of Chaliang also intermarried with the Siamese (Xiān) rulers of Ayodhya. Their descendants, later known as the Uthong (Lavo) dynasty, ruled Ayodhya until the traditional formation of the Ayutthaya Kingdom in 1351.

The Pu Khun Chit Khun Jot Inscription (จารึกปู่ขุนจิดขุนจอด) records a dynastic tie between Nan and Chaliang, which later extended to Sukhothai. The Wat Phra That Chang Kham recension of the Nan Chronicle agrees.

=== Sukhothai period ===
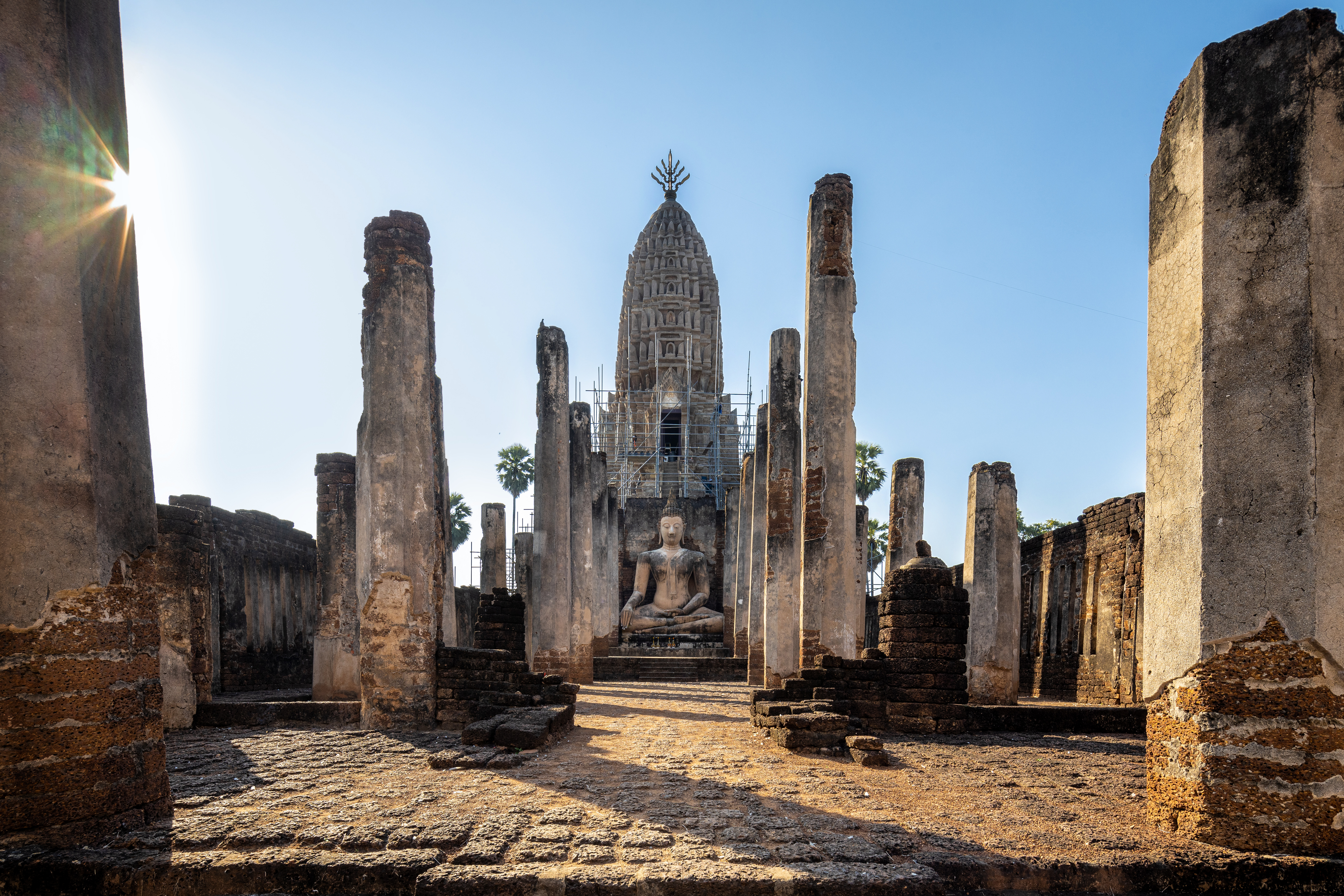
Wat Phra Si Rattana Mahathat Chaliang, built in the 13th century and located in the former capital, Chaliang.

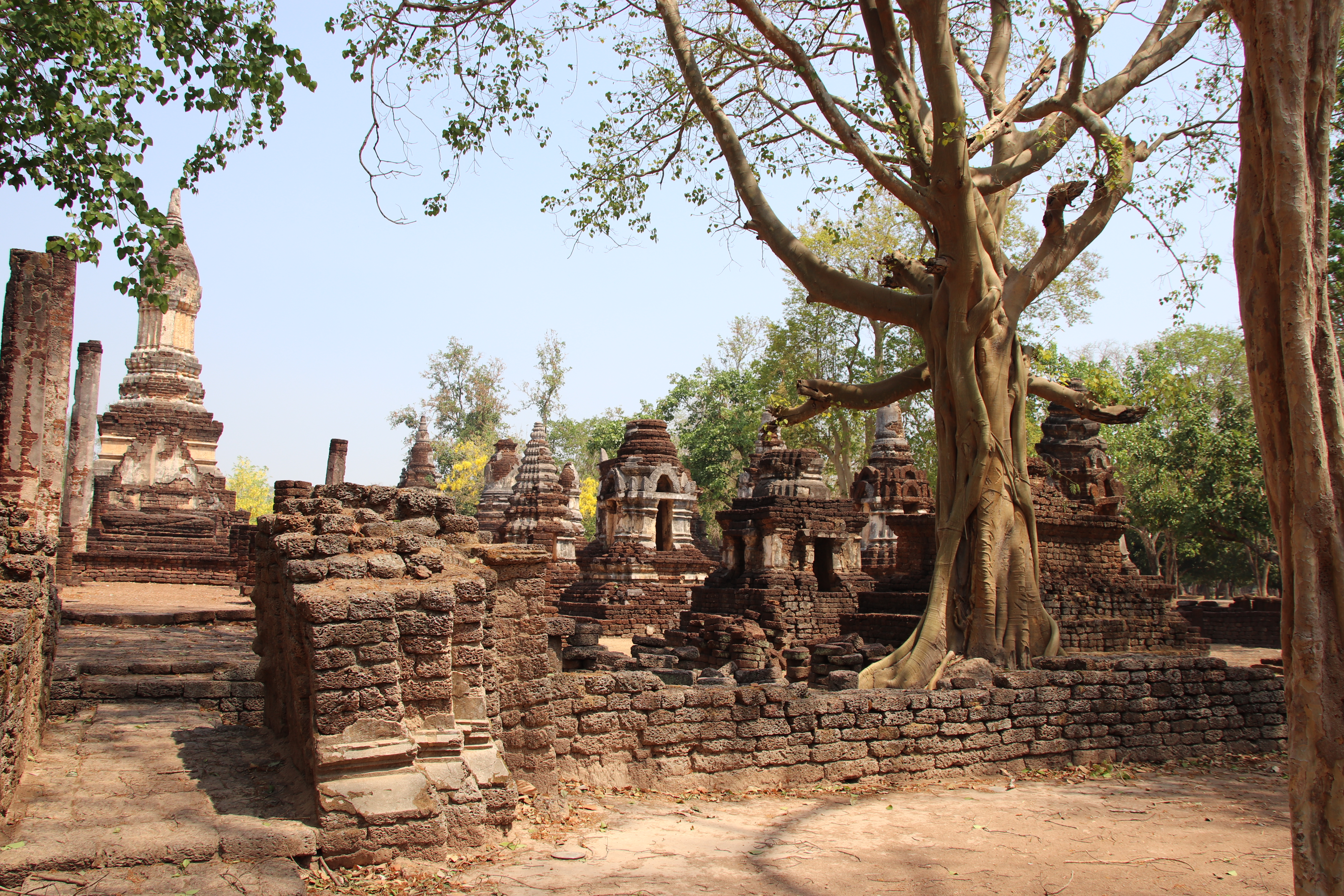
Wat Chedi Chet Thaeo in Si Satchanalai, built by a princess of king Thammaracha in the 10th century.

In 1157/58, Chaliang was taken by a Tai ruler from Chawa (ชวา, Muang Sua) or the Nam Ou basin. His line is said to have extended its influence to Sukhothai in 1175. Nobles of the Lavo faction took Sukhothai in 1181, and the rulers of Mueang Rat and Mueang Bang Yang joined forces to take it back in 1238.

After Chaliang led by Sri Naw Nam Thum annexed Sukhothai in 1157, the seat moved there, and the Sukhothai Kingdom was established in 1238. Sri Naw Nam Thum is thought to have been a Tai noble from what is now Uttaradit province, in the Nan River basin north of Sukhothai.

Chusak reads the walled city as a foundation of the late 13th century, about 2 km upstream of the Chaliang centre. He attributes the move to the Yom cutting its bank, a growing population, and a better defensive position at Kaeng Luang. It was thereafter also called Sawankhalok or Si Satchanalai. Bishop and colleagues, from the river's deposits, held that the Yom has had roughly its present course past the site since its first settlement. They found the tradition of a change of course after the town's founding difficult to sustain. They also judged impossible Le May's statement of 1925 that Chaliang was the oldest settlement, before Si Satchanalai was founded and the river changed course. Floods, they note, came before, during and after the city's life, and the wall was built across the flood channels.

The Fine Arts Department describes the monuments of the 13th century at the bend as work in the Khmer Bayon manner: the gate tower of Wat Phra Si Rattana Mahathat Chaliang, a laterite core faced with stucco and carrying four faces which it surmises to be a bodhisattva, and the single tower of Wat Chao Chan, later converted to a Theravada temple. At Wat Chom Chuen a chedi was built over a structure resembling a Khmer prasat. White-glazed Southern Song wares from the Dehua kilns in Fujian, of the same century, were found outside the wall at Wat Phra Si Rattana Mahathat.

Sujit Wongthes placed the first community around Wat Phra Si Rattana Mahathat and Wat Chao Chan on the bend of the Yom. He read Si Satchanalai as its enlargement to the north-west, walled to enclose Khao Phanom Phloeng and Khao Suwannakhiri, and traced an earlier earthen wall running from south of Wat Chao Chan. The names themselves are disputed. Michael Vickery argued in 1990 that the temples at the bend and the walled area to the north formed a single settlement, which he called Chaliang–Sawankhalok. He read the inscriptions as naming Si Satchanalai as a place distinct from Chaliang. Inscription 10, of 1404, names Chaliang alone. He judged the most likely site of Si Satchanalai to be a group of deserted temples and old wells about 20 km to the south, near the Fa Kradan River. Bishop and colleagues reported his argument and left the question open.

Sukhothai's kings were at first reckoned rulers of Chaliang as well. That held until the death of Ram Khamhaeng in 1298, after which Sukhothai's authority weakened and its dependencies broke away; Chaliang went nearly 50 years without a ruler until Lithai was appointed in 1340.

Several Sukhothai inscriptions treat Si Satchanalai as the equal of Sukhothai, both being capitals of a Sukhothai–Si Satchanalai kingdom under one line of kings.

In the 14th century Sukhothai–Si Satchanalai expanded northward, destroying and annexing the Tai Yuan city-state of Mueang Li and deporting much of its population.

After Lithai's reign Sukhothai declined, and both towns became vassals of the Ayutthaya Kingdom. Legend has Khottrabong (โคตรบอง) appointed ruler. He was probably deposed in 1429 by a usurper, Saeng Hang (แสงหัง).

=== Ayutthaya period ===
Chaliang was known in this period as Sawankhalok. Historical records on Chaliang during this period are sparse. After Sukhothai became an Ayutthayan vassal, Chaliang, Phitsanulok and Kamphaeng Phet were probably detached from it under a policy of divide and rule meant to break Sukhothai's power. Ayutthaya called Sukhothai and these three the Northern Cities (หัวเมืองเหนือ). Chronicles revised in the Rattanakosin period count all four among the sixteen vassals of Ramathibodi I. That list conflicts with other evidence and is taken to be a later insertion, perhaps from the reign of Intharacha. Vickery found the earliest link between the names Chaliang and Sawankhalok in two Ayutthayan chronicle fragments covering 1439–1444. In their lists of the northern chiefs, first place usually goes to the Phraya Chaliang, ruler of Sawankhalok, rather than to the ruler of Phitsanulok. He later allowed that the surviving copy may be a later one that brought some terms up to date. In the Nan chronicle the ruler of Nan escaped imprisonment by his brothers in 1434 and fled to the Phraya Chaliang. He retook Nan with troops from Chaliang the next year, and sought his help again in 1450.

Ayutthaya controlled the Sukhothai succession, and Yutthisathian, son of Maha Thammaracha IV, resented being given the lesser seat of Songkwae–Phitsanulok. He transferred his allegiance to Lan Na in 1452 and urged King Tilokaraj to attack the Northern Cities. Ayutthaya answered by reducing three of the four, Songkwae, Sukhothai and Kamphaeng Phet, from vassals to frontier towns under governors sent from the capital. Chaliang kept its vassal standing until Lan Na took it in 1462 and renamed it Chiang Chuen (เชียงชื่น). The Yuan Phai describes Chiang Chuen with three rings of moats, although the town by then had laterite walls.

Ayutthaya recovered the town within a few years and held it as a frontier town. It stood on the route between Ayutthaya, Burma and Lan Na, however, and was periodically abandoned as its people fled the fighting.

== Rulers ==
Ruler		Reign	Notes/Contemporary events
Romanized name	Thai Name	Reign	Notes/Contemporary events
Satchanalai	สัชนาไลย		Chiefdom of Panchamatchakam (Later evolved to "Sawankalok" ("Chaliang" or "Si Satchanalai")
Thammaracha I	ธรรมราชา	Early 600s	
Under Dvaravati of Lavo: 7th–8th century.
Unknown			Thammaracha I's lineage
Unknown			Thammaracha I's lineage
Unknown			Thammaracha I's lineage. No male heir.
Under Qiān Zhī Fú: 8th – 9th century
Under Xiān: Early 10th century – 950s
Sudhammaraja	สุธรรมราชา	?–957	Ruled from Phitsanulok
Under Haripuñjaya: 950s – 1017
In 927/28, Lavo's Lavapura was conquered by Tambralinga's king, Sujita. Since then, several polities in the Menam valley, as well as Lavo's rival Haripuñjaya in the north were attacked by Sujita and his son, Kampoch.
Arunaraja	อรุณราชกุมาร/พระร่วง	950s–?	Son of Abhayakamini (Noble from Haripuñjaya ; Refounder of Sukhothai); Chaliang was mentioned as Chéng Liáng (程良) in the Chinese text History of Song (1001); Son-in-law of the previous.
Since 1017, as an independent kingdom under Mon–Tai rulers. (Lavo's Lavapura declined and was destroyed by the Angkorin king, Suryavarman I, in 1002.)
Suvacanaraja	พสุจกุมาร/ สุพจราช	1052–?	Younger brother of the previous.; Grandfather of Kesariraja, King of Lavo's Lopburi (r. 1106–1115)
King of Chiang Saen, Śrīdharmatripiṭaka, invaded Chaliang. To avoid the devastation, Supojarat had his daughter marry Śrīdharmatripiṭaka. Later, their son Kesariraja ascended to the throne of Lavo in 1106.
name unknown			Father-in-law of Kesariraja of Lavo
Uthong I	อู่ทองที่ 1/ สร้อยหล้า	?–1188/89	Younger brother of Phra Phanom Thale Seri (King of Phrip Phri) and also of Sukhandhakiri (King of Thung Yang); Dynastic relationship with the predecessor remains unknown
Uthong I moved south from Chaliang and took over the empty throne at Suphannaphum in 1190s.
Pattasucaraja	พัตตาสุจราช	1188/89–?	
Dharmatriloka	ธรรมไตรโลก	Late 12th – early 13th century	Son of the previous; Father of Ayodhya kings, Dhammaraja and Baramaraja
Rajadhiraj II	ราชาธิราช	Early 13th century	Youngest son of the previous.; Period of instability
After the reign of a mixed Tai–Mon–Chinese King, Rajadhiraj II, Chaliang was occupied by another Tai monarch from Chawa (ชวา, Muang Sua) in Nam Ou basin, who established a royal intermarriage with Angkor.
The seat was split into two: Mueang Chaliang and Sukhothai
Chaliang under a new dynasty annexed Sukhothai in 1219 and assigned it the new seat.
Sri Naw Nam Thum	พ่อขุนศรีนาวนำถุม	Early 13th century – ?	Also ruler of Sukhothai as the founder. (Note: Founder of Sukhothai. However, another source, Legend of Kalawandith, says Sukhothai was founded in 500 by Phraya Pali Rat (พระยาพาลีราช).); The Manam Valley was called San-lo 三濼 as mentioned in Lingwai Daida in 1178.
Khom Sabat Khlon Lamphong	ขอมสบาดโขลญลำพง	?–1238	Usurper, possibly relative of Sri Naw Nam Thum; Also King of Sukhothai (r.1181/82–1237/38)
As Sukhothai Kingdom: 1238–1423
Si Inthrathit	ศรีอินทราทิตย์	1238–1270	Son of the previous.; Also the first king of Sukhothai; Chaliang was moved westward and renamed Sawankhalok (สวรรคโลก).
Ban Mueang	บานเมือง	1270–1271	Son of the previous. Also king of Sukhothai
Ram Khamhaeng	รามคำแหง	1279–1298	Younger brother of the previous. Also king of Sukhothai
After the reign of Ram Khamhaeng, several vassals of the Sukhothai Kingdom broke away and the throne of Chaliang/Sawankhalok was vacant for almost 50 years.
Lithai	ลิไทย	1340–1368	Also king of Sukhothai (1347–1368); After the reign of Lithai, Sukhothai Kingdom became a vassal of Ayutthaya.
Under Sukhothai Kingdom, which itself as the vassal of Ayutthaya Kingdom: 1378–1423
As direct vassal of Ayutthaya Kingdom: 1423–1462
Sri Yotsarat	ศรียศราช	Before 1423–1434?	
Phraya Chaliang	พระยาเชลียง	1434–1461?	
Saen	แสน	1461?–1468	During the reign of Saen, Ayutthaya Kingdom lost Chaliang to Lan Na.
As vassal of Lan Na: 1462–1474
Yutthisathian	ยุทธิษเฐียร	1468–1474	Son of Sukhothai's king, Maha Thammaracha IV.; As king of Sukhothai–Chiang Chuean (Si Satchanalai)
Chiang Chuean was incorporated into Lan Na and was governed from Lampang.
