= Wat Si Chum Inscription =

Wat Si Chum Inscription Sukhothai Inscription No. 2
- จารึกวัดศรีชุม
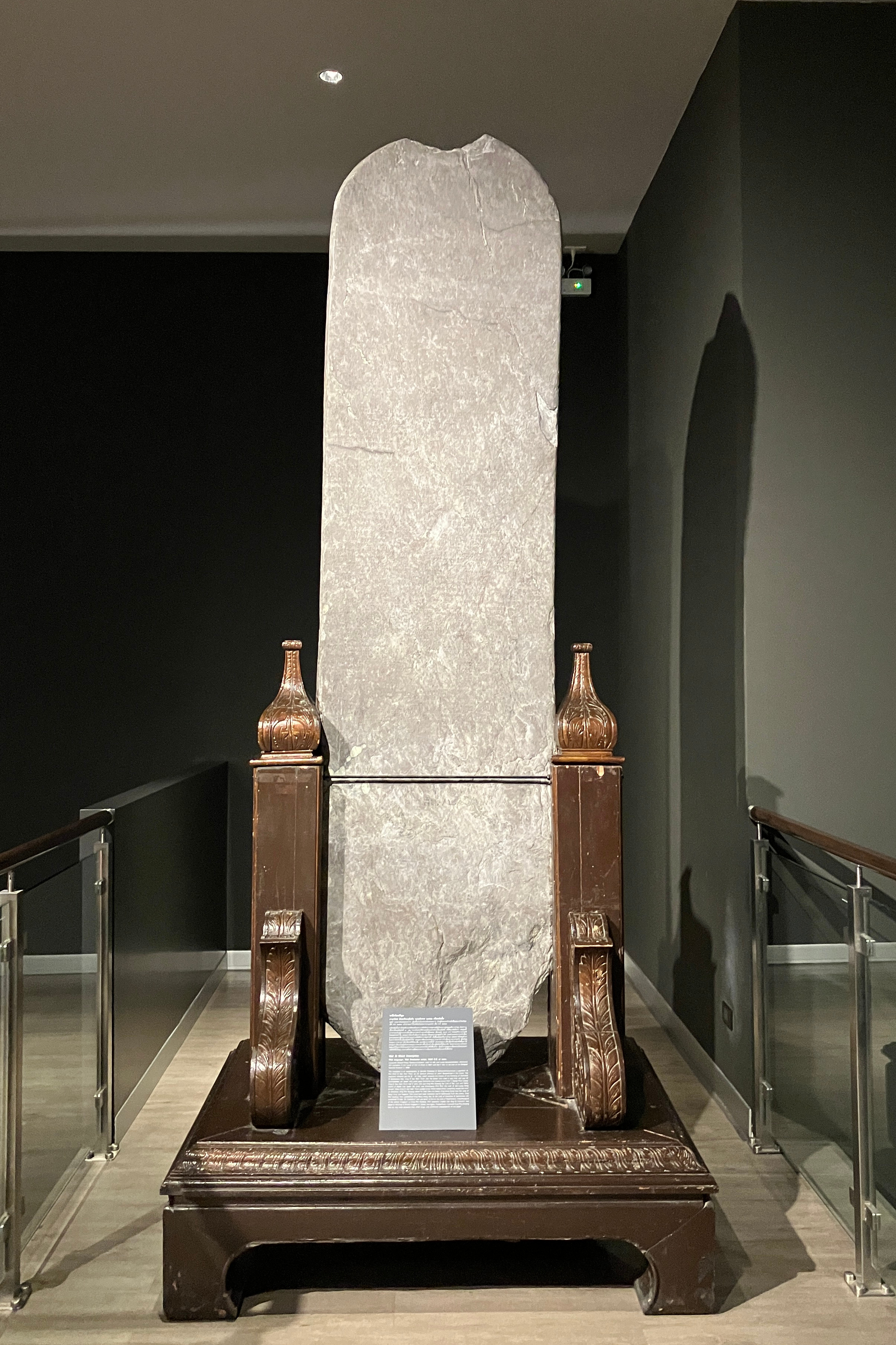
- Type: Inscription
- Material: Shale
- Height: 275 centimetres (108 in)
- Width: 67 centimetres (26 in)
- Writing: Sukhothai script
- Created: c. 1341–1367
- Period/culture: Sukhothai
- Discovered: 1887 in Wat Si Chum, Muang Kao, Mueang Sukhothai district, Sukhothai
- Discovered by: Lord Samosorn Pollakarn
- Present location: Bangkok National Museum

The Wat Si Chum Inscription, formally known as Sukhothai Inscription No. 2, is a sema stone bearing an inscription in the early Thai script. It is most significant as a historical source for the foundation of Sukhothai in the 13th century. It was discovered in 1887, and was eventually deciphered and dated to 1341–1367, in the reign of Maha Thammaracha I, and is thought to have been made by Phra Maha Thera Sri Sattha who is the descendant of Sri Naw Nam Thum, founder of the Sukhothai-Si Satchanalai.

The text adds detail to the Ram Khamhaeng Inscription's account of the establishment of Sukhothai. It covers the politics of the Sukhothai royalty before the Phra Ruang dynasty, that is, the Namthum dynasty, and carries the life of Phra Maha Thera Sri Sattha (พระมหาเถรศรีศรัทธา) in his secular and his monastic years.

== Description and discovery ==
The stele is made of shale in a Bai sema-shaped sheet with a width of 67 cm, a height of 275 cm, and a thickness of 8 cm. The upper left tip of the first side is damaged. It was discovered in 1887 by Lt.Gen. Lord Samosorn Pollakarn (Thai: พลโท หลวงสโมสรพลการ; ทัด สิริสัมพันธ์) in Wat Si Chum's Mandapa tunnel in Sukhothai Old City, while on duty to search for other historical shreds of evidence after the discovery of the Ram Khamhaeng Inscription in 1833. It was sent to be placed in the Bangkok National Museum in 1908, then to the National Library of Thailand for deciphering, and back to be kept at the Bangkok National Museum. The Jātaka scenes engraved on stone slabs at Wat Si Chum carry short glosses in Thai, which the Fine Arts Department registers collectively as Sd.32.

== Deciphering ==
The inscription of Wat Si Chum, which contains 212 lines of writing; 107 lines on the first side, and 95 lines on another side, is one of the Sukhothai inscriptions that is difficult to decipher as the script at the beginning and end of both sides is faded. In addition, the overall inscription content has complicated details and is not in chronological order, making it difficult to conclude the continuity of the content from beginning to end. In 1891, the inscription which was still preserved at Wat Si Chum was photographed by a French archaeologist Lucien Fournereau and was later published in Le Siam Ancien (Part 2) in 1908, but the decipherment was not completed.

The inscription was deciphered into Thai and later published in the Book of Siam Inscription Conference Part 1 (ประชุมจารึกสยาม ภาค ๑) in 1934. The Fine Arts Department also held seminars to decipher the text three times, in 1977, 1979 and 1980. After that, the completed decipherment version of the text was published in late 1980.

== Language ==
Christian Bauer, who refers to the stele as Sd.2, examined its Thai against Late Old Mon. Early Thai sadāṁ at side B line 61 is attested once in the whole Sukhothai corpus, and he read it as a blend of the Old Mon prefix s-, which marks the hypothetical, with Early Thai dāṁ. At that line the verb carries two markers of the same category, cakk before it and the Mon prefix on it, which he took for interference rather than convergence. Because the prefix occurs nowhere else in Sukhothai epigraphy and nowhere in later Thai, he suggested that the first language of that one writer may not have been Thai but Mon.

He assigned further items in the text to Mon. Patai comes from Old Mon pdey 'inside' and is a hapax in Thai; tirǝas jāt 'existence' and suṅ from Old Mon sruṅ 'hole' he took from Michael Vickery, who reaches the paper only through his report. He read rūp brah and ʼann hnlayʼ as calques of Old Mon expressions, and found a suspect double causative at B.81. The text uses 'that' 41 times against 'this' 8, a ratio he called structurally identical with Old Mon. He also questioned a translation. Griswold and Prasert ṇa Nagara render tray karyā at A.89 as ‘three kinds of almsfood’; Bauer answered that Old Mon trey is an honorific before nouns and not the numeral, which is pi, and gave five attestations. He records that they left A.90 untranslated for want of context.

== Historical content ==
Chusak Satienpattanodom reads the inscription as saying only that Sri Naw Nam Thum reigned in two nakhon, Si Satchanalai and Sukhothai, and notes that it gives no year for any event of his reign. He observes that it names Si Satchanalai and Chaliang separately in a single text, and takes that as evidence that the settlement had by then become two centres rather than one.

On his summary of the campaign, Khom Sabat Khlon Lamphong held both cities. Pha Mueang, lord of Mueang Rat and son of Sri Naw Nam Thum, called in Pho Khun Bang Klang Hao of Mueang Bang Yang. Bang Klang Hao took Si Satchanalai and Bang Khlang and returned both to Pha Mueang. Pha Mueang then took Sukhothai and gave it to Bang Klang Hao, consecrating him under the name the Khmer ruler had granted. That the return of the two towns shows they were Pha Mueang's by right is Chusak's inference rather than a statement of the text.

The inscription is also his source for Phra Maha Thera Sri Sattha as a grandson of Sri Naw Nam Thum and for Pho Khun Ram Ratcha building the Phra Si Rattana Mahathat at Chaliang.

The inscription was also the first historical evidence to mention Khom, groups of people practicing Hinduism or Mahayana Buddhism that settled in the south of Sukhothai along the Chao Phraya River basin.
