= Khom Sabat Khlon Lamphong =

13th-century ruler of Sukhothai

Ruler of Sukhothai
- Predecessor: Sri Naw Nam Thum
- Successor: Si Inthrathit

Khom Sabat Khlon Lamphong (Thai: ขอมสบาดโขลญลำพง) was a ruler of Sukhothai and Si Satchanalai in the 13th century. He is mentioned in the Wat Si Chum Inscription. According to the inscription, he took control of the two cities after the death of Sri Naw Nam Thum.

Khom Sabat Khlon Lamphong was later defeated by Pha Mueang and Bang Klang Hao. After the battle, Pha Mueang gave Sukhothai to Bang Klang Hao, who became known as Si Inthrathit.

His identity is uncertain. Some scholars have described him as a Khmer official or nobleman, while others believe he was a local ruler with links to Lavo.
