= Pattasucaraja =

Legendary ruler of Si Satchanalai

Pattasucarāja

Ruler of Si Satchanalai
- Successor: Dharmatriloka
- Issue: Dharmatriloka; Baramatriloka

Pattasucarāja (Thai: พัตตาสุจราช) is a ruler of Si Satchanalai mentioned in the Northern Chronicle. According to the chronicle, he had two sons, Dharmatriloka and Baramatriloka. His elder son, Dharmatriloka, succeeded him as ruler.

== Chronicle account ==
The Northern Chronicle states that Pattasucarāja died at the age of 160. After his funeral, the ministers crowned Dharmatriloka as ruler of Si Satchanalai. The chronicle also gives the date of Pattasucarāja's death as Friday, the fifth waxing day of the twelfth lunar month, in the Year of the Ox. It does not give a year that can be securely converted to the Gregorian calendar.

The chronicle continues that Dharmatriloka travelled to Oghapuri (โอฆบุรี), where he became a Buddhist monk. King Koroparaja built a monastery for him and a chedi containing his hair. The monastery was named Wat Chulamani.
