= Loe Thai =

King of Sukhothai

Loe Thai เลอไทย
- Phaya Loe Thai

Phaya of Sukhothai
- Reign: 1298 - 1323
- Predecessor: Sai Songkhram (Regent)
- Successor: Ngua Nam Thum
- Born: c. 1262; Sukhothai Kingdom
- Died: 1323 (61 years old); Sukhothai Kingdom
- Issue: Li Thai (Maha Thammaracha I); May Hnin Htapi
- Dynasty: Phra Ruang
- Father: Ram Khamhaeng the Great
- Religion: Theravada Buddhism

Loe Thai (Thai: เลอไทย, pronounced [lɤ̄ː tʰāj]) was the fourth king of the Sukhothai Kingdom (a historical kingdom of Thailand) from 1298 to 1323. He was preceded by his father Ram Khamhaeng the Great until the throne was usurped by his cousin Ngua Nam Thum.

After the death of Ram Khamhaeng, the Sukhothai tributaries broke away. Ram Khamhaeng was succeeded by his son Loe Thai. The vassal kingdoms, first Uttaradit in the north, then soon after the Laotian kingdoms of Luang Prabang and Vientiane (Wiangchan), liberated themselves from their overlord. In 1319, the Hanthawaddy kingdom to the west broke away. In 1321, Phrae Tak, one of the oldest towns under the control of Sukhothai, became free. To the south, the powerful city of Suphan Buri also broke free early in the reign of Loe Thai.

He sent an expedition against Champa around 1312, though George Cœdès thinks it was his father who organized the raids in 1313.

== See also ==
- Sukhothai Kingdom

Loe Thai Phra Ruang Dynasty Born: ? Died: 1323
Regnal titles
Vacant Sai Songkhram (Regent) Title last held by Ram Khamhaeng	King of Sukhothai; 1298–1323	Succeeded by Ngua Nam Thum
