= Ban Mueang =

Ban Mueang บานเมือง
- Khun
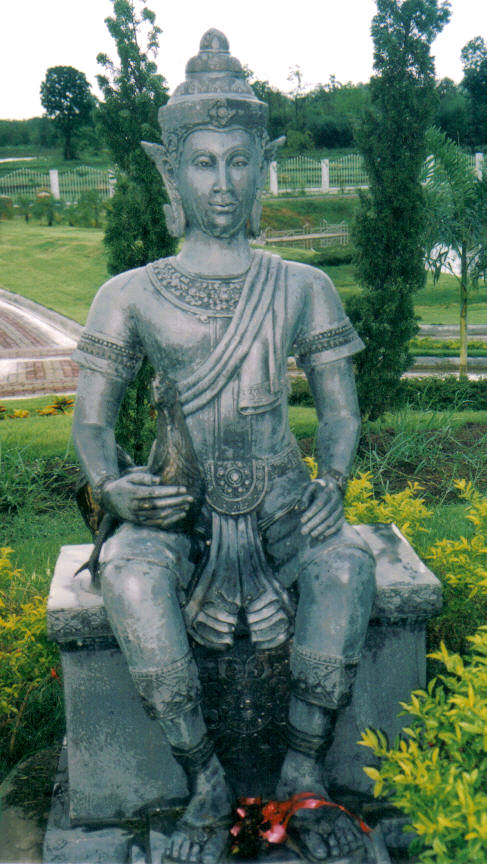

King of Sukhothai
- Reign: c. ? – c. 1822 BE (1279/80 CE)
- Predecessor: Si Inthrathit
- Successor: Ram Khamhaeng
- Died: c. 1822 BE (1279/80 CE)
- Issue: Ngua Nam Thum
- Dynasty: Phra Ruang
- Father: Si Inthrathit
- Mother: Sueang

Ban Mueang (Thai: บานเมือง, pronounced [bāːn mɯ̄a̯ŋ]) was a king of Sukhothai, an ancient kingdom in Thailand. He was from the Phra Ruang dynasty.

== Name ==
List of abbreviations used
Abbreviation	For
BE	Buddhist Era
CE	Common Era

The name Ban Mueang (Thai: บานเมือง) means "one who delights the nation".

In Thai, the name is usually misspelt as "บาลเมือง", which is pronounced the same and means "one who protects the nation".

He is merely referred to as Ban (บาน) in the Pu Khun Chit Khun Chot Inscription (Inscription No. 45), created in 1935 BE (1392/93 CE).

== Life ==
He was the second son of King Si Inthrathit of Sukhothai and his wife, Sueang. He succeeded his father to the throne of Sukhothai in an unknown year and reigned until his death, which occurred around 1822 BE (1279/80 CE).

The Ram Khamhaeng Inscription (Inscription No. 1), which was allegedly created in 1835 BE (1292/93 CE) and contains an autobiography of his younger brother, Ram Khamhaeng, states:

My father was named Si Inthrathit. My mother was named Lady Sueang. My elder brother was named Ban Mueang. There were five of us born from the same womb: three boys and two girls. My eldest brother died when he was still a child... In my father's lifetime, I served my father and I served my mother. When I caught any game or fish, I brought them to my father. When I picked any acid or sweet fruits that were delicious and good to eat, I brought them to my father. When I went hunting elephants and caught some, either by lasso or by driving them into a corral, I brought them to my father. When I raided a town or village and captured elephants, men and women, silver or gold, I turned them over to my father. When my father died, my elder brother was still alive. I served him steadfastly as I had served my father. When my elder brother died, I got the whole kingdom for myself.

Ban Mueang is also mentioned in the Pu Khun Chit Khun Chot Inscription which describes the lineage of the House of Phra Ruang.

As stated by both inscriptions, Ban Mueang was, upon his death, succeeded by his younger brother, Ram Khamhaeng.

A historical document, Jinakalamali, states that Ban Mueang had a son, Ngua Nam Thum, who later became a king of Sukhothai.

A great-great-grandchild of Ban Mueang was named after Ban Mueang according to the ancient custom of naming a baby after its ancestor. The great-great-grandchild ascended the throne of Sukhothai as Mahathammaracha IV.

== Bibliography ==
- Chulalongkorn University (1984). "Silacharuek Phokhun Ram Khamhaeng Dan Thi Nueng" ศิลาจารึกพ่อขุนรามคำแหง ด้านที่ ๑ [King Ram Khamhaeng's Inscription, Face 1]. Bangkok: Ramkhamhaeng University. Archived from the original on 2016-03-05.
- Na Nakhon, Prasoet (2006). Prawattisat Bettalet ประวัติศาสตร์เบ็ดเตล็ด [Historical Miscellanea] (in Thai). Bangkok: Matichon. ISBN 9743236007.
- Princess Maha Chakri Sirindhorn Foundation (2011). Namanukrom Phramahakasat Thai นามานุกรมพระมหากษัตริย์ไทย [Directory of Thai Kings] (in Thai). Bangkok: Princess Maha Chakri Sirindhorn Foundation. ISBN 9786167308258.
- SAC (2006). "Charuek Phokhun Ram Khamhaeng" จารึกพ่อขุนรามคำแหง [King Ram Khamhaeng's Inscription]. Thai Inscriptions Database (in Thai). Bangkok: SAC. Archived from the original on 2015-09-24.
- SAC (2006). "Charuek Pu Khun Chit Khun Chot" จารึกปู่ขุนจิดขุนจอด [Pu Khun Chit Khun Chot Inscription]. Thai Inscriptions Database (in Thai). Bangkok: SAC. Archived from the original on 2015-09-24.
- Mahāwitthayālai Sukhōthaithammāthirāt; Khrōngkān Sūn Sukhōthaisưksā. (1996). Sārānukrom Sukhōthaisưksā สารานุกรมสุโขทัยศึกษา (เล่ม ๒ ฝ–ฮ) [Sukhothai Studies Encyclopedia (Volume 2: Letters Fo–Ho)] (in Thai). Bangkok: Sukhothai Thammathirat Open University. ISBN 9789746149372.
- Wongthes, Sujit (1983). Sukhothai Mai Chai Ratchathani Haeng Raek Khong Thai สุโขทัยไม่ใช่ราชธานีแห่งแรกของไทย [Sukhothai is not the first Thai kingdom] (in Thai). Bangkok: Matichon. ISBN 9748350363.

Ban Mueang Phra Ruang Dynasty Born: ? Died: ca 1822 BE (1279/80 CE)
Regnal titles
Preceded by Si Inthrathit	King of Sukhothai ? – ca 1822 BE (1279/80 CE)	Succeeded by Ram Khamhaeng
