= Mueang Sukhothai district =

Mueang Sukhothai เมืองสุโขทัย
- District
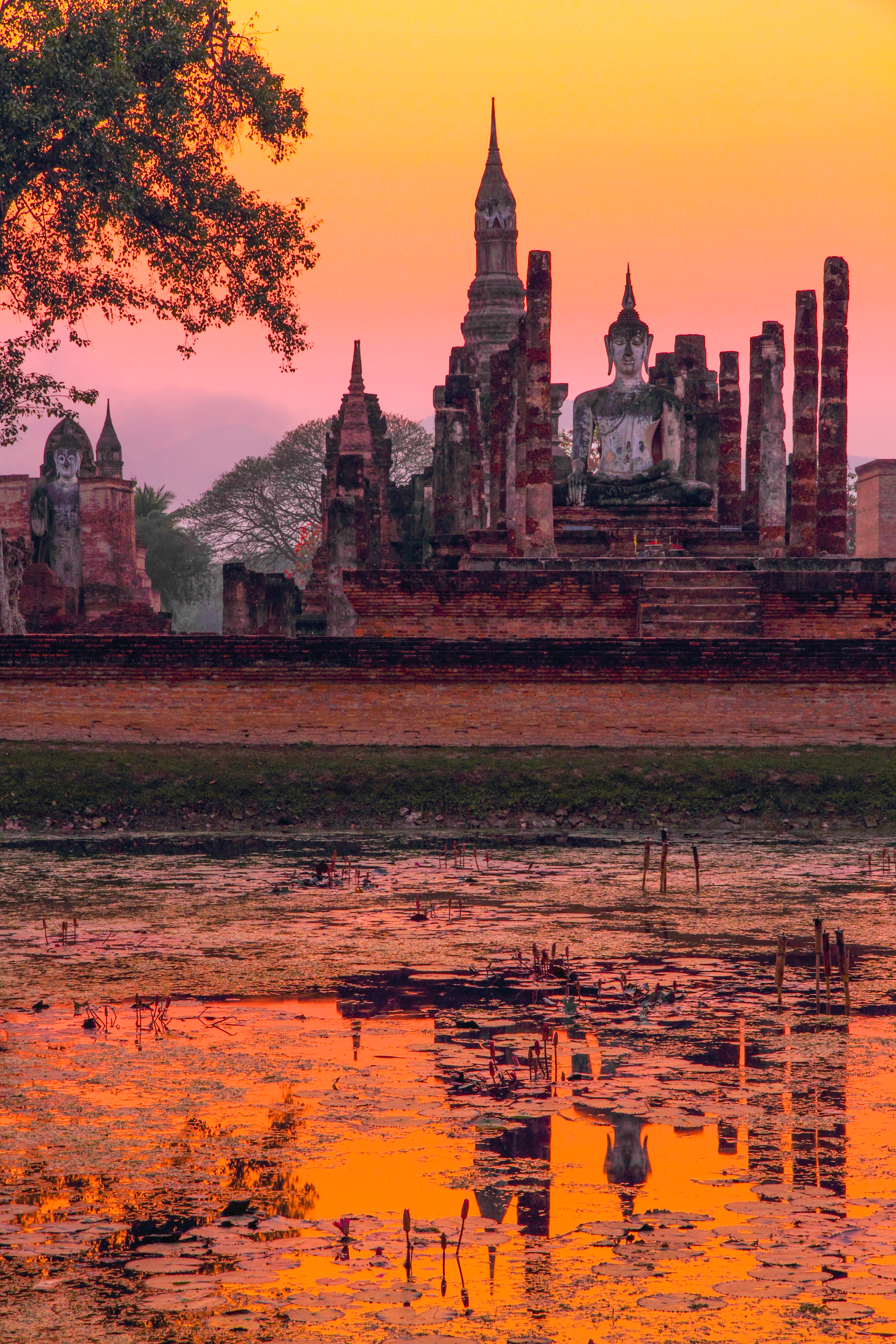
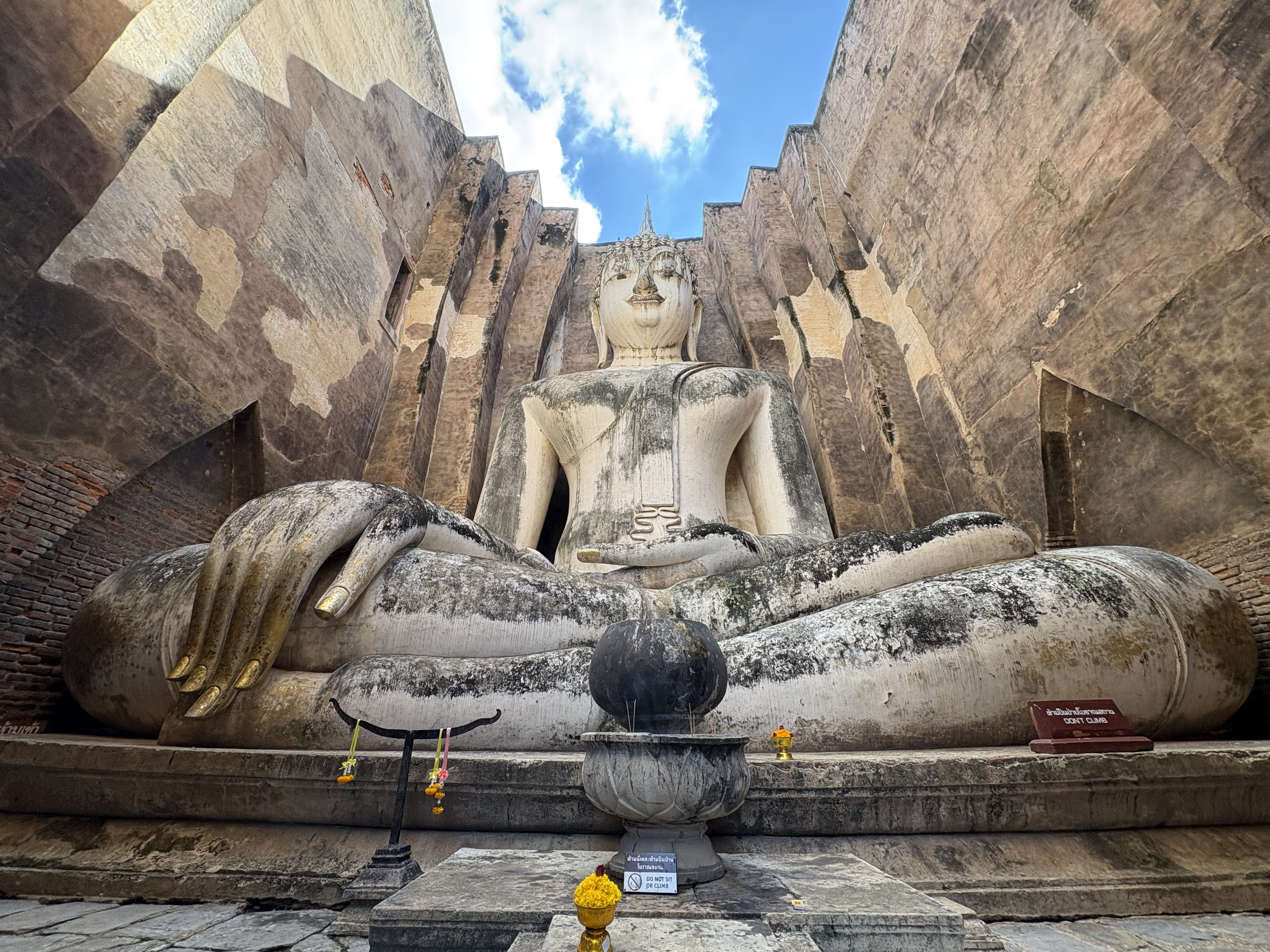
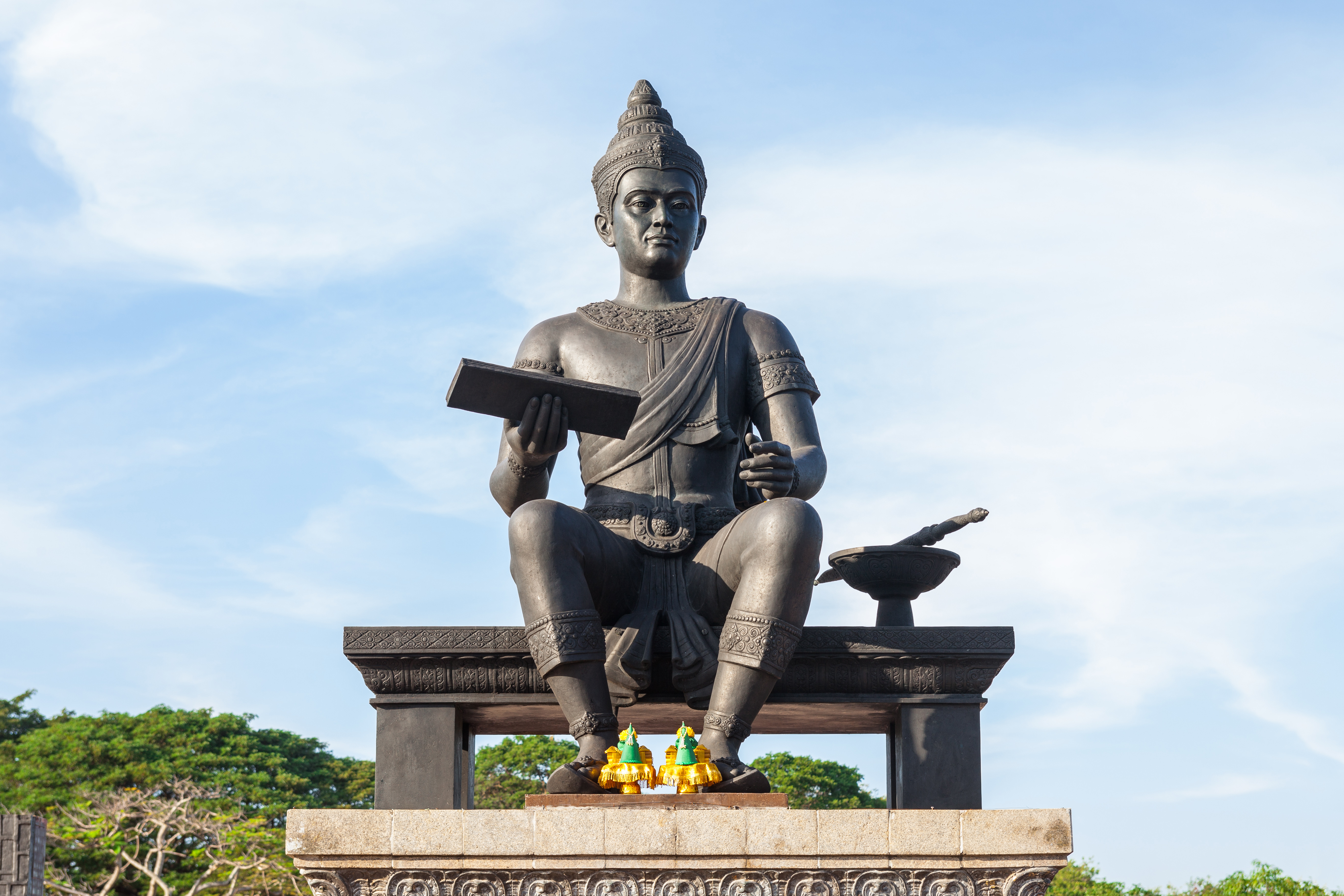
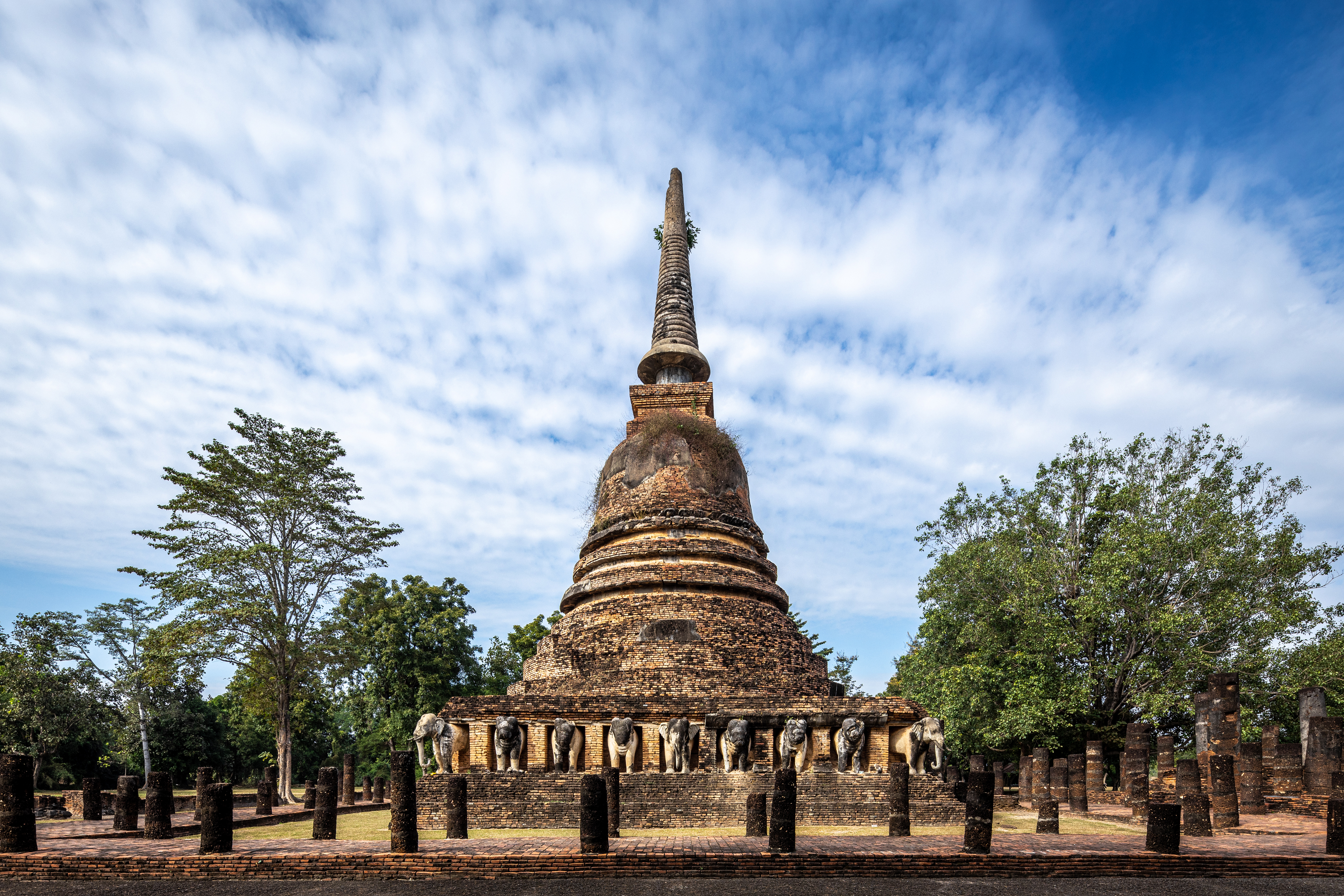
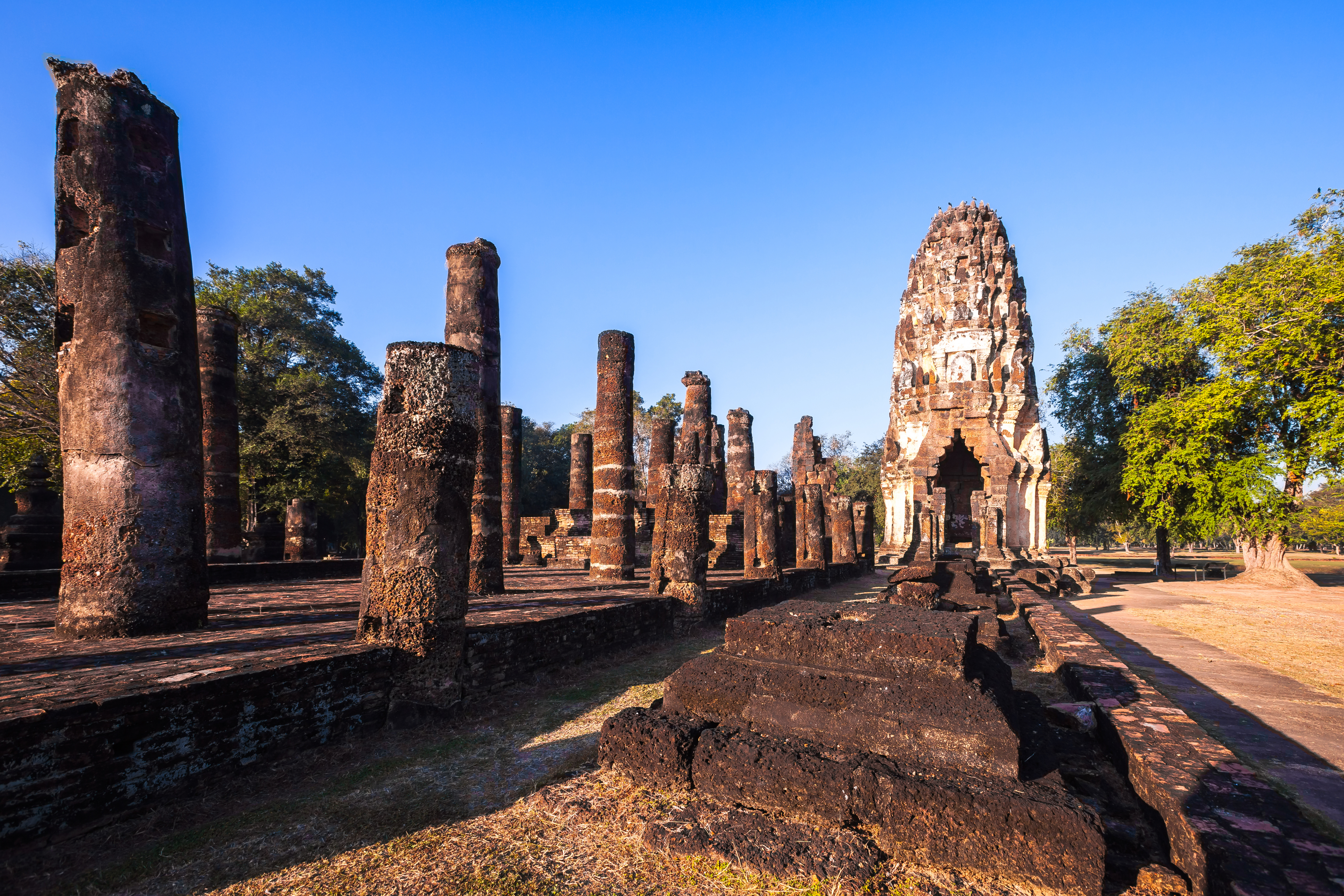
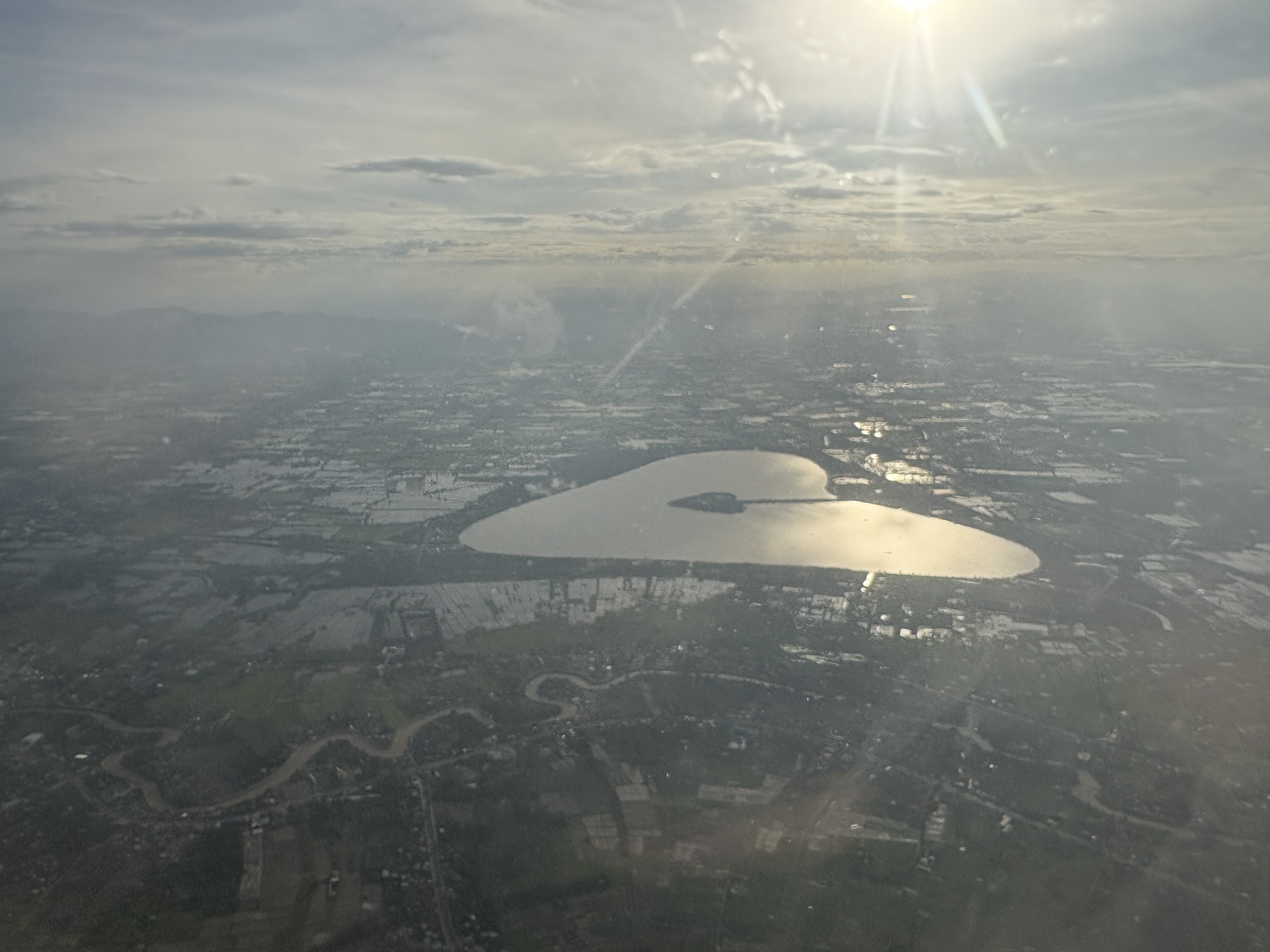
- Wat Maha That Phra Achana Buddha Statue King Ramkhamhaeng Monument Wat Chang Lom Wat Phra Phai Luang Thung Thale Luang

- District location in Sukhothai province
- Coordinates: 17°0′28″N 99°49′23″E
- Country: Thailand
- Province: Sukhothai
- Seat: Sukhothai Thani

Area
  - Total: 581.5 km^{2} (224.5 sq mi)

Population (2008)
  - Total: 106,397
  - Density: 185/km^{2} (480/sq mi)
- Time zone: UTC+7 (ICT)
- Postal code: 64000
- Geocode: 6401

Mueang Sukhothai (Thai: เมืองสุโขทัย, pronounced [mɯ̄a̯ŋ sù.kʰǒː.tʰāj]) is the capital district (amphoe mueang) of Sukhothai province, northern Thailand.

== Geography ==
Neighboring districts are (from the southeast clockwise) Kong Krailat, Khiri Mat, Ban Dan Lan Hoi and Si Samrong of Sukhothai Province and Phrom Phiram of Phitsanulok province.

The important water resource is the Yom River.

== History ==
Originally named Mueang as the capital district of Sukhothai Province, in 1917 the district was renamed Thani (ธานี). In 1932, the province Sukhothai was abolished and merged into Sawankhalok Province. In 1939 the province was renamed Sukhothai, and the district, by then named Sukhothai Thani (สุโขทัยธานี) was renamed Mueang Sukhothai.

== Administration ==
The district is divided into 10 sub-districts (tambons), which are further subdivided into 98 villages (mubans). The town (thesaban mueang) Sukhothai Thani covers tambon Thani. There are a further two sub-district municipalities (thesaban tambon): Ban Suan and Mueang Kao, each covering parts of the same-named tambons. There are a further nine tambon administrative organizations (TAO).

No.	Name	Thai	Villages	Pop.
1.	Sukhothai Thani	ธานี	None	16,479
2.	Ban Suan	บ้านสวน	14	14,249
3.	Mueang Kao	เมืองเก่า	11	17,482
4.	Pak Khwae	ปากแคว	9	9,195
5.	Yang Sai	ยางซ้าย	12	9,749
6.	Ban Kluai	บ้านกล้วย	14	17,270
7.	Ban Lum	บ้านหลุม	9	8,988
8.	Tan Tia	ตาลเตี้ย	11	4,245
9.	Pak Phra	ปากพระ	10	3,695
10.	Wang Thong Daeng	วังทองแดง	8	5,045
