= Si Thep =

Si Thep may refer to:

- Si Thep Historical Park, an archaeological site in Thailand covering the ancient city of Si Thep
- Si Thep district, the modern district (amphoe) surrounding the site
