= Maha Thammaracha I =

King of Sukhothai (1347–1368)

Li Thai ลิไทย
- Phra Maha Thammaracha I
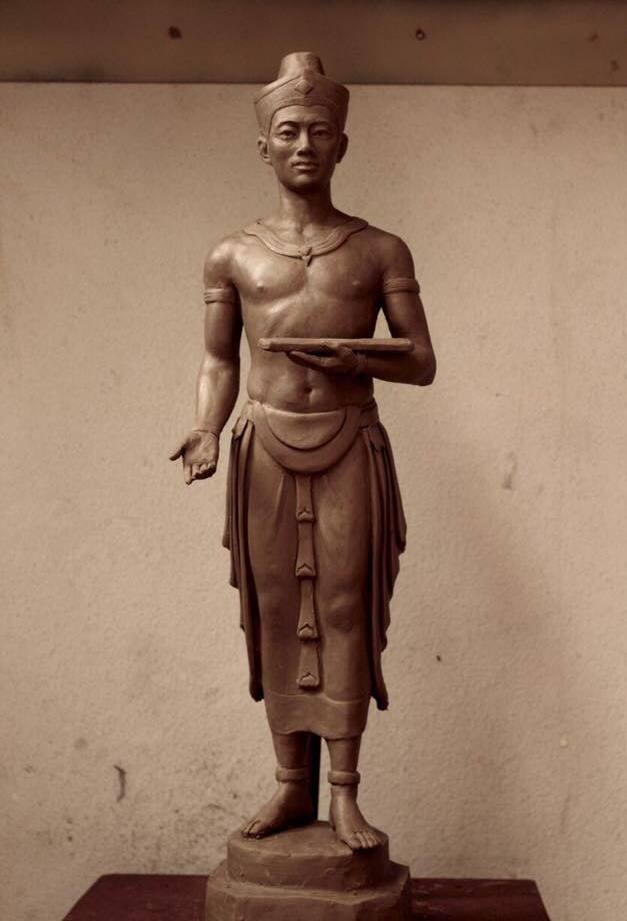

King of Sukhothai
- Reign: 1347 - 1368
- Predecessor: Ngua Nam Thum
- Successor: Lue Thai (Maha Thammaracha II)
- Born: Li Thai c. 1300; Sukhothai Kingdom
- Died: 1368 (68 years old); Sukhothai Kingdom
- Issue: Lue Thai (Maha Thammaracha II)
Regnal name
- Phrabat Kamrateng An Sri Suryavamsa Rama Mahadharmarajadhiraja
- Dynasty: Phra Ruang
- Father: Loe Thai
- Religion: Theravada Buddhism

Maha Thammaracha I (Thai: มหาธรรมราชาที่ ๑, pronounced [mā.hǎː tʰām.mā.rāː.t͡ɕʰāː tʰîː nɯ̀ŋ]), born as Li Thai (Thai: ลิไทย, pronounced [líʔ.tʰāj]), was King of Sukhothai. He was the first Buddhist philosopher to write in the Thai language. He reigned from roughly 1347 until his death in 1368. Li Thai was the son of Loe Thai and the grandson of Ram Khamhaeng the Great.

The exact chronology of Li Thai's rise to the throne is unclear. Popular tradition names him as the fourth king of Sukhothai, but dynastic records seem to indicate that at least one other king (Ngua Nam Thum) ruled between Li Thai and his father, as well as the regent Phaya Sai Songkhram who ruled during Loe Thai's absence following the death of Ramkhamhaeng.

Li Thai served as Upparat (viceroy) during his father's reign from the city of Si Satchanalai, an important urban center of the early Sukhothai Kingdom.

Li Thai wrote the Trai Phum Phra Ruang ("three worlds by Phra Ruang", Phra Ruang being the dynastic name of Li Thai's lineage), a religious and philosophical text describing the various worlds of Buddhist cosmology, and the way in which karma consigns living beings to one world or another. The Ten Virtues of a sovereign were set down as guiding principles for Thai monarchs. The Traiphum Phra Ruang would go on to serve as an important political document, being re-interpreted in response to changes in the domestic and international political scene.

Li Thai also built Wat Phra Si Rattana Mahathat in Phitsanulok, including Phra Phutta Chinnarat, the biggest Buddha image in the northern territory of Siam.

According to George Cœdès, Li Thai's devotion to Buddhism and his religious works earned him the title Maha Thammaracha, meaning "great pious king". He constructed many Buddha footprints and restored Wat Mahathat of Sukhothai. He was succeeded by his son Lue Thai.

== Government ==
The kings of Sukhothai has used the Thammaracha (king of righteousness) governing style before the reign of Lithai, being based on the principle of Dharma of a king from Brahma scrolls of Dharma. Over time, as Buddhism became more widespread, the principles of Dharma from Buddhism become slowly integrated into the Thammaracha governing style up to the reign of Lithai who holds great respect for Buddhism. The principle that Lithai primarily adheres to includes Tosaphit Ratchatham, the ten virtues to which a ruler is purposed to hold; Chakkrawat Diwat, the twelve behaviors in which a ruler should follow; and Rachajanyanuwatr, the four abilities that a ruler should possess.

Because Sukhothai kingdom holds many smaller cities/states that are related to each other due to family ties of the ruling class, the resulting government structure could be considered as Oligarchy or Aristocracy, where each of the cities ruler adhere to the dharma of Aparihaniyadhamma, a set of rules which aims to prevent the development of degeneracy.

Although sticking to the Thammaracha governing style results in a peaceful and positive relationship between the ruler and its citizens, it discourages conflict and violence too, which leads to a lower military power and in turn leads to Sukhothai finally being invaded and forced to become a tributary state by Ayutthaya Kingdom in the future.

=== Religion ===
As Li Thai admired Buddhism greatly, he used Buddhism as a diplomatic, educational, and governing tool, having also wrote the religious text Traiphum Phra Ruang during his time as a Upparat (viceroy), which has been used in teaching the citizens to do good and to abstain from doing evil, this book is then continued to be an important text that is used in Thailand's education up to the present date. Furthermore, Lithai has also divide the Buddhist priests into two sections, the Kamawasri which focuses on teaching Buddhism to the general populations and on studying the Pra Trai Pidok (Thai: พระไตรปิฎก), and the Aranyawasri which focuses on seeking enlightenment, in order for the priest to both enrich Buddhism and spread teachings at the same time.

In fostering educations through religion, Lithai has allow studying of Buddhist disciplines and for Brahmin to study various liberal arts within the vicinity of the royal palace.

Lithai has spread the teaching of Buddhism through many methods, primarily in the form of Traiphum Phra Ruang text, but also through the construction of temples and famously in becoming a priest himself during the year 1362, serving as an example for the citizens to follow. He actively advocate for the citizens to visits temples to listen to teachings and perform acts of charity. In spreading Buddhism to other states, Lithai send priests to their cities to teach Buddhism, and also invite other cities to come and pay respect at the various religious buildings within Sukhothai Kingdom. He has also invited a Buddhist Patriarch from Lanka to enrich Buddhism in Sukhothai, having also repair many temples and build many Buddha statues such as Prahphuddachinnasri.

Lithai having dedicated himself in the enrichment of Buddhism all his life, has been given the title of a Thammaracha, meaning a king who grants satisfaction through Dharma.

== Works ==
=== Phitsanulok ===
During the year 1363, due to the pressure from Ayutthaya kingdom invading neighboring provinces to the south, Lithai moves the capital of Sukhothai kingdom to Phitsanulok in order to be able to care for provinces near the south, and from that point, Lithai stayed in Phitsanulok for seven years up until the end of his reign in 1369. During his stay, he has built many historical constructions, one of them being Chan Royal Palace which has continued to be the residence for monarchs of Sukhothai Kingdom after Lithai's death, and continued to be the residence of monarchs of Ayutthaya period after Sukhothai has been taken over by Ayutthaya kingdom.

Aside from the palace, Lithai has built many religious constructs, the most prominent one being Praputthachinnarat, being hailed as one of the most beautiful Buddha statues created in Thailand.

Lithai is the first king to have ever settled in and brought prosperity to Phitsanulok.

=== Traiphum Phra Ruang ===
Traiphum Phra Ruang is a Buddhist literature, and the oldest Thai literature known (not counting Sukhothai Inscription No.1), has been written by Lithai around the year 1345, six years after he has been appointed as a viceroy. The literature was intended by Lithai to be used in education as to lower conflict/crime, and improve the citizen's behavior through the teaching of karma and many other Buddhism concepts which instill the fear of karmic consequences in the citizens while encouraging good deeds. Traphum Phra Ruang is considered to be very well cited, which was rare in the era it was written in, having cited 32 Buddhist scrolls, including scrolls from collections such as Phra Trai Pidok and Atthakatha.

Because Traiphum Phra Ruang is a Buddhist text, it has been written with many uncommon words that originated from Pali/Sanskrit language, serving as a prime case study of literature and literacy during Sukhothai era. In modern times, Traiphum Phra Ruang still serves as an academic book for religion and literature classes in Thailand due to its elegant usage of language. During the year 1981, ASEAN Socio Cultural Community had each countries choose a valued literature to be translated to English, the one being chosen for Thailand being Traiphum Phra Ruang, specifically the version rewritten by Pithul Malival (Thai: นายพิทูร มลิวัลย์), being published under the English name "Traibhumikatha : The Story of the Three Planes of Existence" during the year 1985 under "Anthology of ASEAN Literature VOLUME 1a" with another easier to understand version being published under "Anthology of ASEAN Literature VOLUME 1b".

The content of this book covers Buddhist cosmology, describing the birth of the universe and its inhabitant lives as according to Buddhist beliefs, and how the universe consists of three realms. The literature also describes the structure of the universe, Mount Meru and other important mountains, the orbit of Sun, moon and zodiacs, the end and rebirth of the universe, etc. The main method of conveying its content is through the use of multiple smaller fables.

== Sources ==
- Jackson, Peter. 'Re-Interpreting the Traiphuum Phra Ruang' in Buddhist Trends in Southeast Asia. Institute of Southeast Asian Studies, Singapore. 1993. ISBN 981-3035-81-1.

== See also ==
- Sukhothai kingdom

Maha Thammaracha I Phra Ruang Dynasty Born: ? Died: 1368
Regnal titles
| Preceded by Ngua Nam Thum | King of Sukhothai; 1347–1368 | Succeeded by Maha Thammaracha II |
