= Phaya Sai Songkhram =

- King of Sukhothai
- Predecessor: Ram Khamhaeng
- Successor: Loe Thai
Names
- Phaya Sai Songkhram
- Dynasty: Phra Ruang Dynasty

Phaya Sai Songkhram (Thai: พญาไสสงคราม) (also called Pu Saisongkhram) was a ruler of the historical Thai Kingdom of Sukhothai. He became regent in 1298 upon sickness and death of his father, Ram Khamhaeng the Great, until his brother, Loe Thai ascended the throne upon his return from China.

Phaya Sai Songkhram Phra Ruang Dynasty Born: ? Died: ?
Regnal titles
Preceded by Ram Khamhaeng as the sovereign	King of Sukhothai; Regent; 1298	Succeeded by Loe Thai as the sovereign
