= Sukhothai Thani =

Modern town north of Bangkok on the River Yom in Thailand

Sukhothai Thani เทศบาลเมืองสุโขทัยธานี
- Town municipality
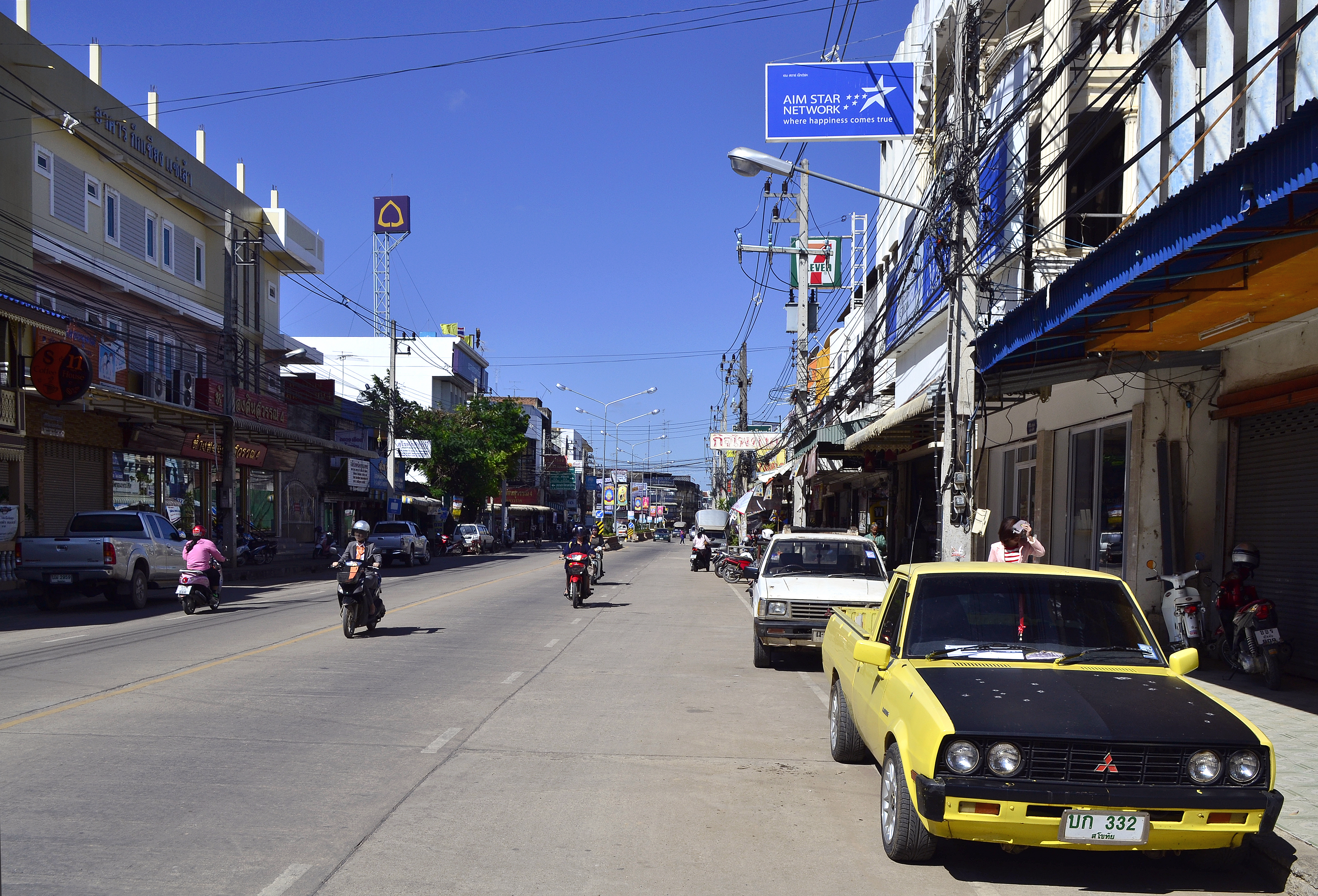
- Singhawat Road within Sukhothai Thani
- Interactive map of Sukhothai Thani
- Coordinates: 17°00′38″N 99°49′13″E
- Country: Thailand
- Province: Sukhothai

Area
  - Total: 3.5 km^{2} (1.4 sq mi)

Sukhothai Thani (Thai: สุโขทัยธานี, pronounced [sù.kʰǒː.tʰāj tʰāː.nīː]) is a small town about 427 km (265 mi) north of Bangkok on the Yom River, a tributary of the Chao Phraya River. It has a population of about 37,000. The town lies about 12 km (7.5 mi) east of the historic city of Sukhothai, the former capital of the first Thai kingdom, usually called the Sukhothai Kingdom. As a result, the modern town is sometimes referred to as 'New Sukhothai'. Sukhothai Thani is the capital of Sukhothai province.

== History ==
Sukhothai Thani Town Municipality was established in 1937 under the Royal Decree establishing Sukhothai Thani Town Municipality in Sawankhalok province. The establishment was proclaimed on 11 March 1937, with the municipal area located in Thani Subdistrict, Mueang Sukhothai District, Sawankhalok Province. In 1939, Sawankhalok Province was renamed Sukhothai province, which remains its name to the present day.

== Geography ==
Location of Mueang Sukhothai district within Sukhothai province

The municipality is located in the upper central region of Thailand, near the centre of Mueang Sukhothai district. It lies about 440 km (270 mi) from Bangkok via National Highway 101.

It borders the following local administrative organizations:

- North: Pak Khwae Subdistrict Administrative Organization, Pak Khwae Subdistrict, Mueang Sukhothai district
- South: Yang Sai Subdistrict Administrative Organization, Yang Sai Subdistrict, Mueang Sukhothai district
- East: Ban Lum Subdistrict Administrative Organization, Ban Lum Subdistrict, Mueang Sukhothai district
- West: Ban Kluai Subdistrict Municipality, Ban Kluai Subdistrict, Mueang Sukhothai district

== Climate ==
Climate data for Sukhothai Thani
Month	Jan	Feb	Mar	Apr	May	Jun	Jul	Aug	Sep	Oct	Nov	Dec	Year
Mean daily maximum °C (°F)	31.6 (88.9)	33.4 (92.1)	35.6 (96.1)	37.9 (100.2)	34.9 (94.8)	33.8 (92.8)	33.2 (91.8)	32.9 (91.2)	32.7 (90.9)	32.8 (91.0)	31.9 (89.4)	31.0 (87.8)	33.5 (92.3)
Mean daily minimum °C (°F)	18.2 (64.8)	20.0 (68.0)	22.3 (72.1)	24.7 (76.5)	24.7 (76.5)	24.9 (76.8)	24.8 (76.6)	24.5 (76.1)	24.3 (75.7)	24.0 (75.2)	21.3 (70.3)	18.8 (65.8)	22.7 (72.9)
Average precipitation mm (inches)	11.7 (0.46)	6.9 (0.27)	16.6 (0.65)	68.3 (2.69)	158.3 (6.23)	211.3 (8.32)	147.5 (5.81)	175.4 (6.91)	293.3 (11.55)	192.8 (7.59)	6.0 (0.24)	9.5 (0.37)	1,297.6 (51.09)
Source: Thai Meteorological Department
