= Princess Maha Chakri Sirindhorn Anthropology Centre =

Academic institution in Thailand

Coordinates: 13.7843°N 100.4588°E

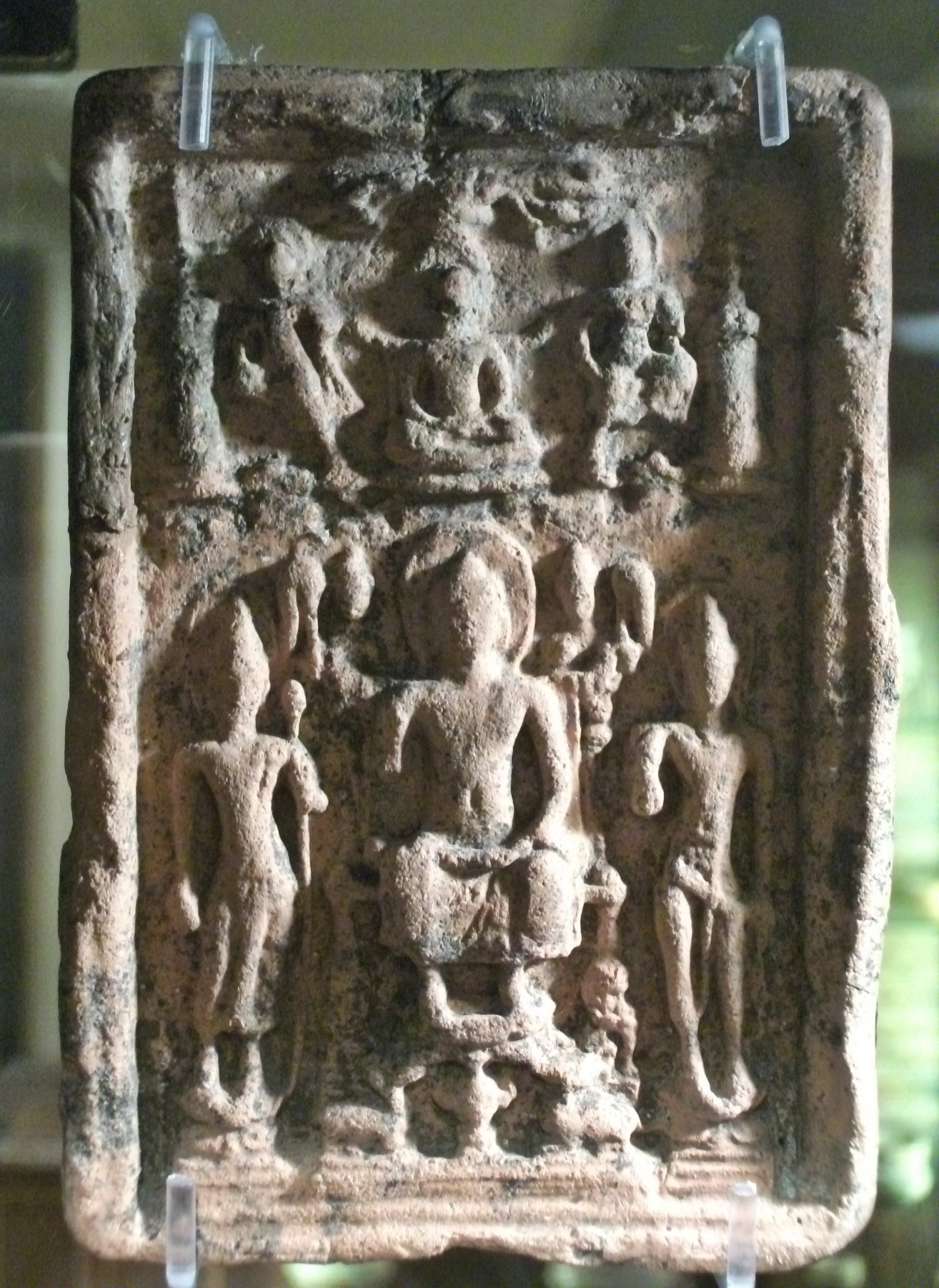
Buddha in Dvaravati art at Anthropology Centre

Princess Maha Chakri Sirindhorn Anthropology Centre (SAC) (Thai: ศูนย์มานุษยวิทยาสิรินธร) is an academic institution under the Ministry of Culture in Taling Chan District, Bangkok, Thailand, established in 1992, with the aim of the systematic gathering, processing, and maintenance of anthropological data scattered throughout the country.

The centre was initiated by Silpakorn University in 1991, started as a faculty-equivalent unit within the university. It became an autonomous organisation in 2000.

The institute is named after Maha Chakri Sirindhorn, Princess Royal of Thailand.

In 2024, the President was Professor Suwanna Satha-Anand who died June of that year.

== History ==
In 1989, Silpakorn University established the project of organizing the centre to glorify Princess Maha Chakri Sirindhorn on the occasion of her 36th birthday in 1991, given her interest in anthropology and related subjects, such as history, linguistics, and archaeology.

The project was approved by royal decree to be a state agency under the aegis of Silpakorn University.
