= Si Inthrathit =

Founder of the Sukhothai Kingdom

Si Inthrathit ศรีอินทราทิตย์
- Khun
- Statue of Si Inthrathit, Sawankhalok District, Sukhothai Province, Thailand

King of Sukhothai
- Reign: 1238–1270
- Predecessor: Sri Naw Nam Thum
- Successor: Ban Mueang
- Born: Bang Klang Hao c. 1188; Mueang Rat
- Died: 1270 (aged 81–82); Sukhothai Kingdom
- Spouse: Sueang
- Issue: Ban Mueang; Ram Khamhaeng the Great; Three other children
Regnal name
- Kamrateng An Sri Inthrabodinthrathit
- House: Phra Ruang
- Father: Chantha Racha
- Mother: Nang Nak
- Religion: Theravada Buddhism

Si Inthrathit (Thai: ศรีอินทราทิตย์, pronounced [sǐː ʔīn.tʰrāː.tʰít]; also spelt Śrī Indrāditya) was the first king of the Sukhothai Kingdom, a historical polity in what is now Thailand. He reigned from 1238 until around 1270 and is credited as the founder of the Phra Ruang dynasty, regarded as the first historical Siamese dynasty. His dynasty holds a dual claim to this distinction—having originated in the very region later designated by foreigners as "Siam", and for being the royal house that liberated the Thai principalities from the Khmer Empire.

== Difficulties in interpretation ==
Initially known as Pho Khun Bang Klang Hao (Thai: พ่อขุนบางกลางหาว), interpreted as ”the lord who rules the sky”, the controversy surrounding this names illustrates the limitations of epigraphy. This science studies inscriptions or epigraphs as writing, to identify graphemes, clarify their meanings, and classify their uses according to dates and cultural contexts. Texts inscribed on steles are often missing the top or bottom portions, just where one would expect dates, complicating the drawing of conclusions about the writing and the writers. Specifically excluded from epigraphy are the historical significance of an epigraph as a document, and the artistic value of a literary composition. These complications led to the ruler in his early life being known as simply Hao (หาว).

== Life ==
Pho Khun Bang Klang Hao was born to the royal family of Sukhothai. His exact ethnic background lineage is unclear, but legend frames him as a descendant of King Patumsuriyawong, which some historians identify as Khmer king Suryavarman II.

Prior to his reign, Bang Klang Hao was the chief of Bang Yang, a territory which belonged to the westernmost regions of the Khmer Empire at that time. The territory now lies in the north-central region of Thailand.

Bang Klang Hao, together with Khun Pha Mueang of Mueang Rat, decided to rebel and declare independence from Angkor. Khmer control and its prohibitive taxes were crucial motivations for the rebellion. Extensive Khmer preoccupation with great architectural works weakened the ability and readiness of Khmer defenses, indirectly aiding the rebellion. Bang Klang Hao captured Si Satchanalai and gave it to Pha Mueang. Pha Mueang reciprocated by giving him Sukhothai.

Pho Khun Bang Klang Hao was then declared king at Sukhothai, taking a regnal name of Sanskrit origin, Si Inthrathit, translated from Adityan Indra. His skill and bravery greatly impressed the people of the kingdom, who thus conferred him the title Phra Ruang (glorious prince). This title was given to all subsequent rulers of Sukhothai, thus giving rise to the first Thai royal dynasty of Phra Ruang.

Si Inthrathit and his queen, Sueang, had three sons. The eldest died at a young age, and the second was named Ban Mueang. His third son defeated a Khmer prince on elephants in mounted combat; he named this youngest son Ram Khamhaeng (Rama the Bold) in tribute to the feat. Si Inthrathit died around 1270, and was succeeded by his son Ban Mueang.

Si Inthrathit Phra Ruang Dynasty Born: ? Died: 1270
Regnal titles
Preceded by Khom Sabat Khlon Lamphong as vassal ruler	King of Sukhothai; 1238–1270	Succeeded by Ban Mueang
