= Ramkhamhaeng =

King of Sukhothai from 1279 to 1298

Ramkhamhaeng พ่อขุนรามคำแหงมหาราช
- Khun
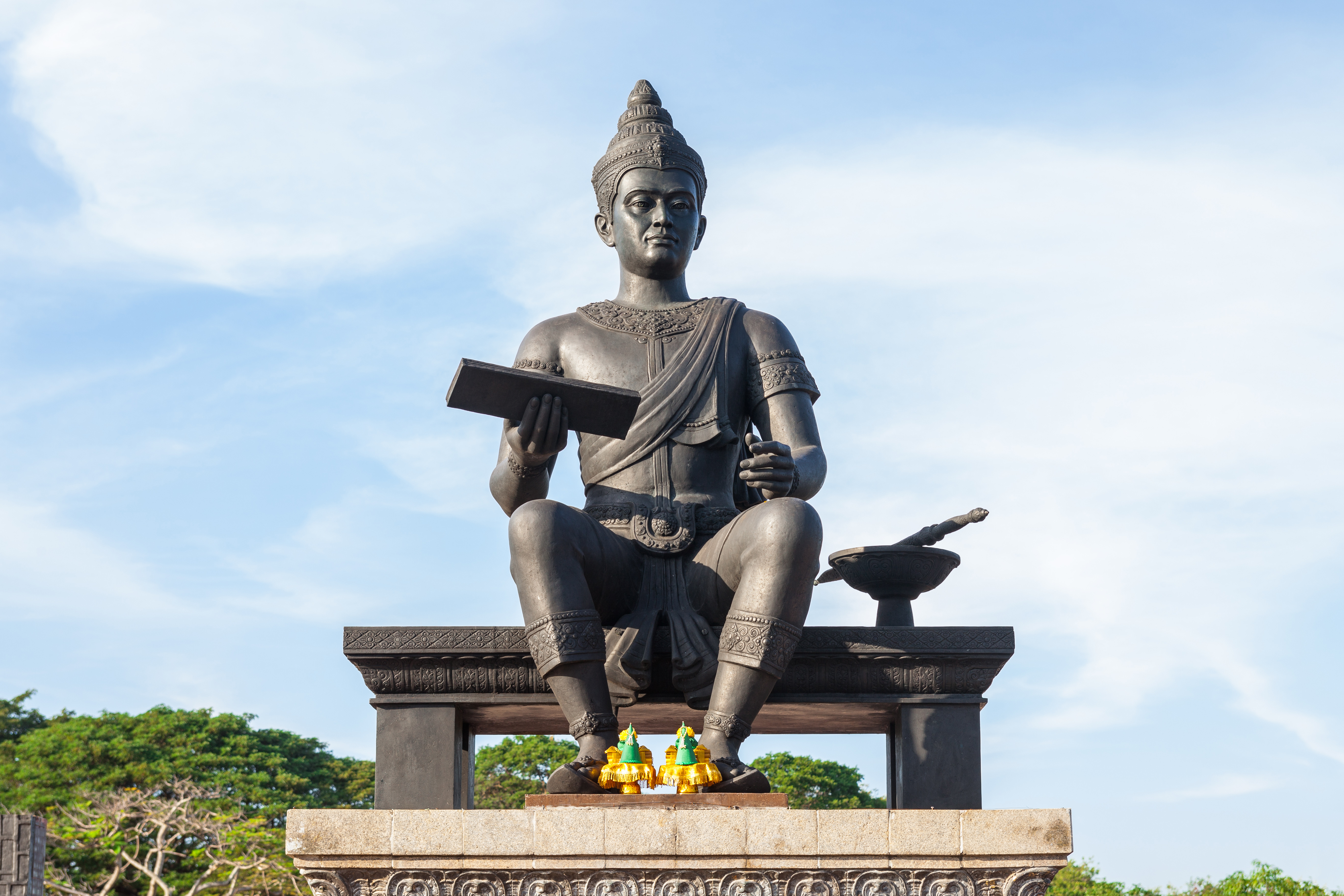
- Statue of King Ramkhamhaeng the Great, Sukhothai Historical Park, Sukhothai Province, Thailand

King of Sukhothai
- Reign: 1279–1298
- Predecessor: Ban Mueang
- Successor: Sai Songkhram (Regent)
- Born: Rama c. 1237 or 1247; Sukhothai Kingdom
- Died: 1298 (aged 51–61); Sukhothai Kingdom
- Issue: Loe Thai; Phaya Sai Songkhram; May Hnin Thwe-Da
Regnal name
- Phrabat Kamrateng An Sri Rammarat (พระบาทกมรเตงอัญศรีรามราช)
- Dynasty: Phra Ruang
- Father: Si Inthrathit
- Mother: Sueang
- Religion: Theravada Buddhism

Ramkhamhaeng (Thai: รามคำแหง, pronounced [rāːm kʰām hɛ̌ːŋ]), commonly known as Pho Khun Ramkhamhaeng the Great (Thai: พ่อขุนรามคำแหงมหาราช, pronounced [pʰɔ̂ː kʰǔn raːm kʰam hɛ̌ːŋ má hǎː râːt]), was the third king of the Phra Ruang dynasty, ruling the Sukhothai Kingdom—a historical polity in what is now Thailand—from 1279 to 1298, during its most prosperous era.

He is credited with the creation of the Thai alphabet and with firmly establishing Theravada Buddhism as the state religion of the kingdom.

== Birth and name ==
Ramkhamhaeng (sometimes written Ram Khamhaeng) was a son of Pho Khun Bang Klang Hao, who ruled as Pho Khun Si Inthrathit, and his queen, Sueang, though folk legend claims his real parents were an ogress named Kangli and a fisherman. He had two brothers and two sisters. The eldest brother died while very young. The second, Ban Mueang, became king following their father's death and was succeeded by Ramkhamhaeng on his death.

At the age of 19, he took part in his father's successful campaign to capture the city of Sukhothai, which had formerly been a vassal of the Khmer Empire. The victory established Sukhothai as an independent kingdom. Owing to his courage in battle, he was reportedly granted the title "Phra Ram Khamhaeng" ("Rama the Bold"). Following his father's death, his elder brother Ban Mueang ascended the throne and appointed Ramkhamhaeng as ruler of Si Satchanalai.

The Royal Institute of Thailand has speculated that Ramkhamhaeng's birth name was "Ram"—derived from Rama, the hero of the Hindu epic Ramayana—as his name following coronation was recorded as "Pho Khun Ramarat" (Thai: พ่อขุนรามราช). At the time, it was customary to name a grandson after his grandfather. According to both the 11th Stone Inscription and the Ayutthaya Chronicles compiled by Prasoet Aksoranit, Ramkhamhaeng had a grandson named "Phraya Ram", whose two grandsons in turn were named "Phraya Ban Mueang" and "Phraya Ram".

The title Maharat (Thai: มหาราช) is the Thai equivalent of "the Great King".

== Accession ==
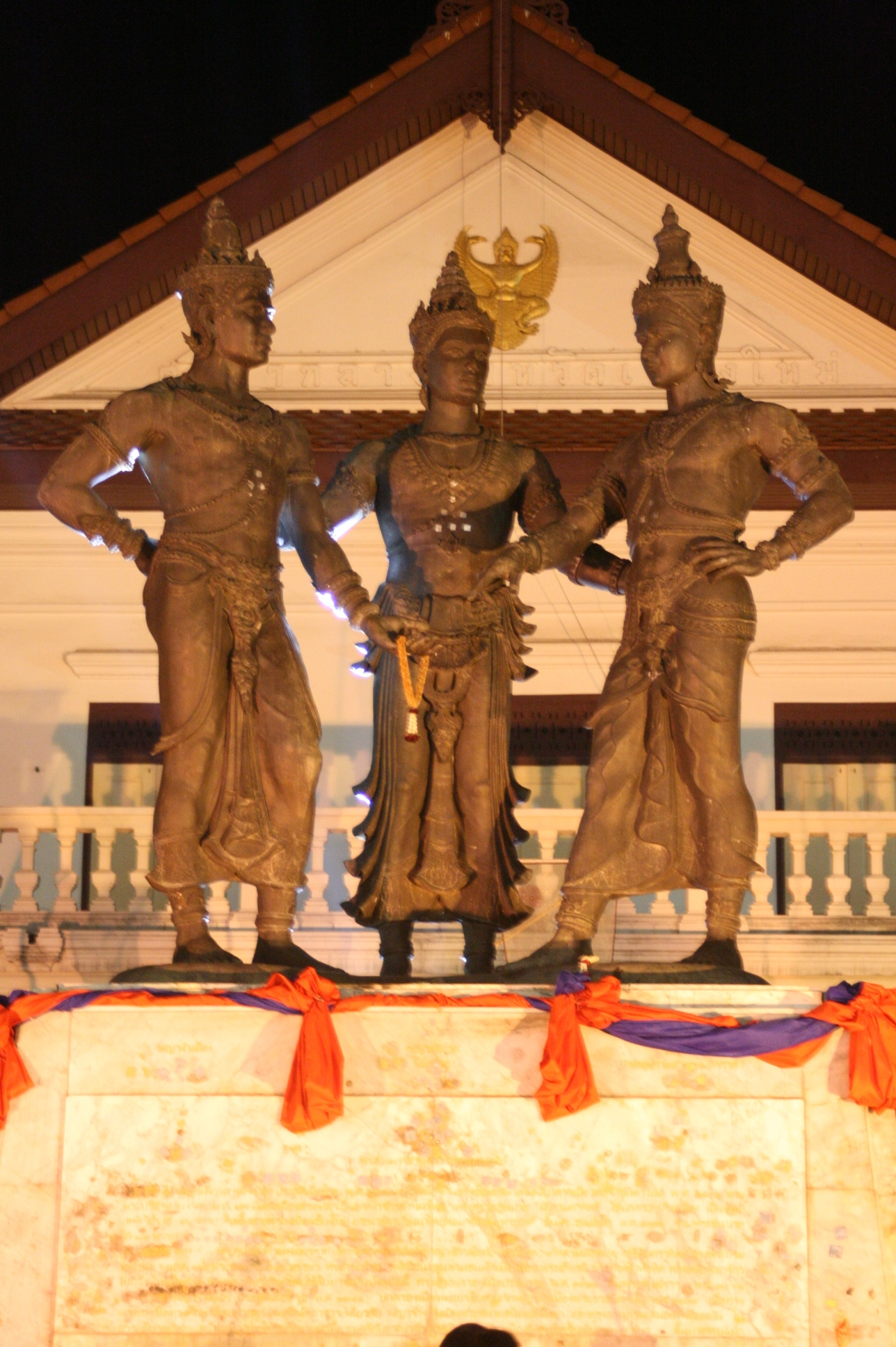
The three kings monument in Chiang Mai: King Ngam Muang of Phayao (left), King Mangrai of Lan Na (center), and King Ramkhamhaeng of Sukhothai (right).

Tri Amattayakun (Thai: ตรี อมาตยกุล), a Thai historian, suggests that Ramkhamhaeng should have acceded to the throne in 1279, the year he planted a sugar palm tree in Sukhothai. Prasert na Nagara of the Royal Institute speculates that this was a tradition of Tai Ahom monarchs, who planted banyan or sugar palm trees on their coronation day in the hope that their reign would achieve the same stature as the tree.

The most significant event at the beginning of his reign was the elopement of one of his daughters, Thai: แม่นางสร้อยดาว, RTGS: Mae-nang Soidao, "Lady Soidao" May Hnin Thwe-Da, with the captain of the palace guards, a commoner. The commoner would found the Burmese Hanthawaddy kingdom and commission compilation of the Code of Wareru, which would provide a basis for the law of Thailand used in Siam until 1908, and in Burma to the present.

== Reign ==
Ramkhamhaeng sent embassies to Yuan China from 1282 to 1323 and imported the techniques to make the ceramics now known as Sangkhalok ceramic ware. He had close relationships with the rulers of nearby city-states, especially Ngammueang, the ruler of neighboring Phayao kingdom (whose wife, according to legend, he seduced), and King Mangrai of Chiang Mai. His campaign against Cambodia left the Khmer country "utterly devastated".

According to Thai history, Ramkhamhaeng is credited with creating the Thai alphabet (Lai Nangsue Thai) from a combination of the Khmer, Sanskrit, Pali, and Grantha alphabets.

It is speculated that Ramkhamhaeng expanded his kingdom as far as Lampang, Phrae, and Nan in the north, Phitsanulok and Vientiane in the east, the Nakhon Si Thammarat Kingdom in the south, the Mon kingdoms of what is now Myanmar in the west, and the Bay of Bengal in the northwest. The Thais also expanded south towards the Malay Peninsula, the History of Yuan mentions “since the people of Sien and of Ma- li-yü-erh have long been killing each other and are all in submission at this moment, an imperial order has been issued telling the people of Sien: do no harm to the Ma-li-yii-erh and hold to your promise.“ However, in the mandala political model, kingdoms such as Sukhothai lacked distinct borders, instead being centered on the strength of the capital itself. Claims of Ramkhamhaeng's large kingdom were intended to assert Siamese dominance over mainland Southeast Asia.

== Death ==
According to the Chinese History of Yuan, King Ramkhamhaeng died in 1298 and was succeeded by his son, Loe Thai, though George Cœdès says it is "more probable" it was "shortly before 1318". Legend holds that Khamhaeng perished in the rapids of the rivers of Sawankhalok. Another source says he was slain by a Malay warrior princess named Adruja Wijayamala Singha during a battle between Thai and Malay armies, in a campaign to conquer Malay lands that make up a third of modern Thailand today.

== Legacy ==
=== Ram Khamhaeng Inscription ===
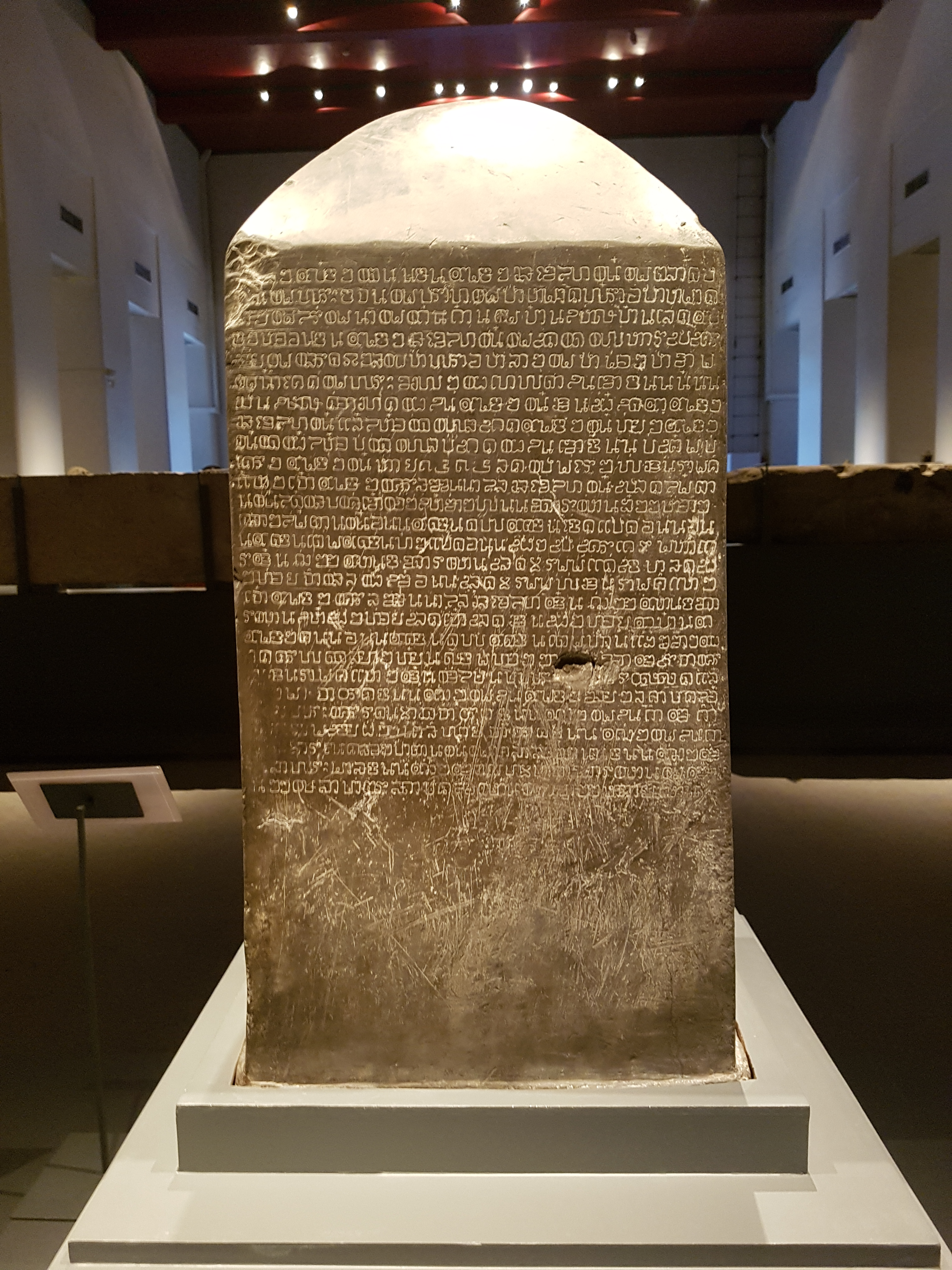
Ramkhamhaeng stele, Bangkok National Museum

Much of the traditional biographical information comes from the inscription on the Ramkhamhaeng stele, composed in 1292, and contains vague facts about the king. It is now found in the Bangkok National Museum. The formal name of the stele is the "King Ramkhamhaeng Inscription". It was added to the Memory of the World Register in 2003 by UNESCO.

=== Sangkhalok ceramic ware ===
Ramkhamhaeng is credited with bringing the skills of ceramic making from China and laying the foundation of a strong ceramic ware industry in the Sukhothai Kingdom. Sukhothai for centuries was the major exporter of the ceramics known as "Sangkhalok ware" (Thai: เครื่องสังคโลก) to countries such as Japan, the Philippines, Indonesia, and even to China. The industry was one of the main revenue generators during his reign and long afterward.

=== Banknote ===
The reverse of the 20 Baht note (series 16), issued in 2013, depicts images of the royal statue of Ramkhamhaeng seated on the Manangkhasila Asana Throne and commemorates the invention of the Thai script by the king.

=== Honour ===
Ramkhamhaeng University, the first Thai university with an open-door policy and with campuses throughout the country was named after Ramkhamhaeng.

=== Video games ===
King Ramkhamhaeng is a playable ruler for the Siamese in Sid Meier's Civilization V.

Ramkhamhaeng Phra Ruang Dynasty Born: (around 1237-1247) Died: 1298
Regnal titles
Preceded by Ban Mueang	King of Sukhothai; 1279–1298	Vacant Sai Songkhram (Regent) Title next held by Loe Thai
