= Mueang Bang Khlang =

Coordinates: 17.228482°N 99.705497°E

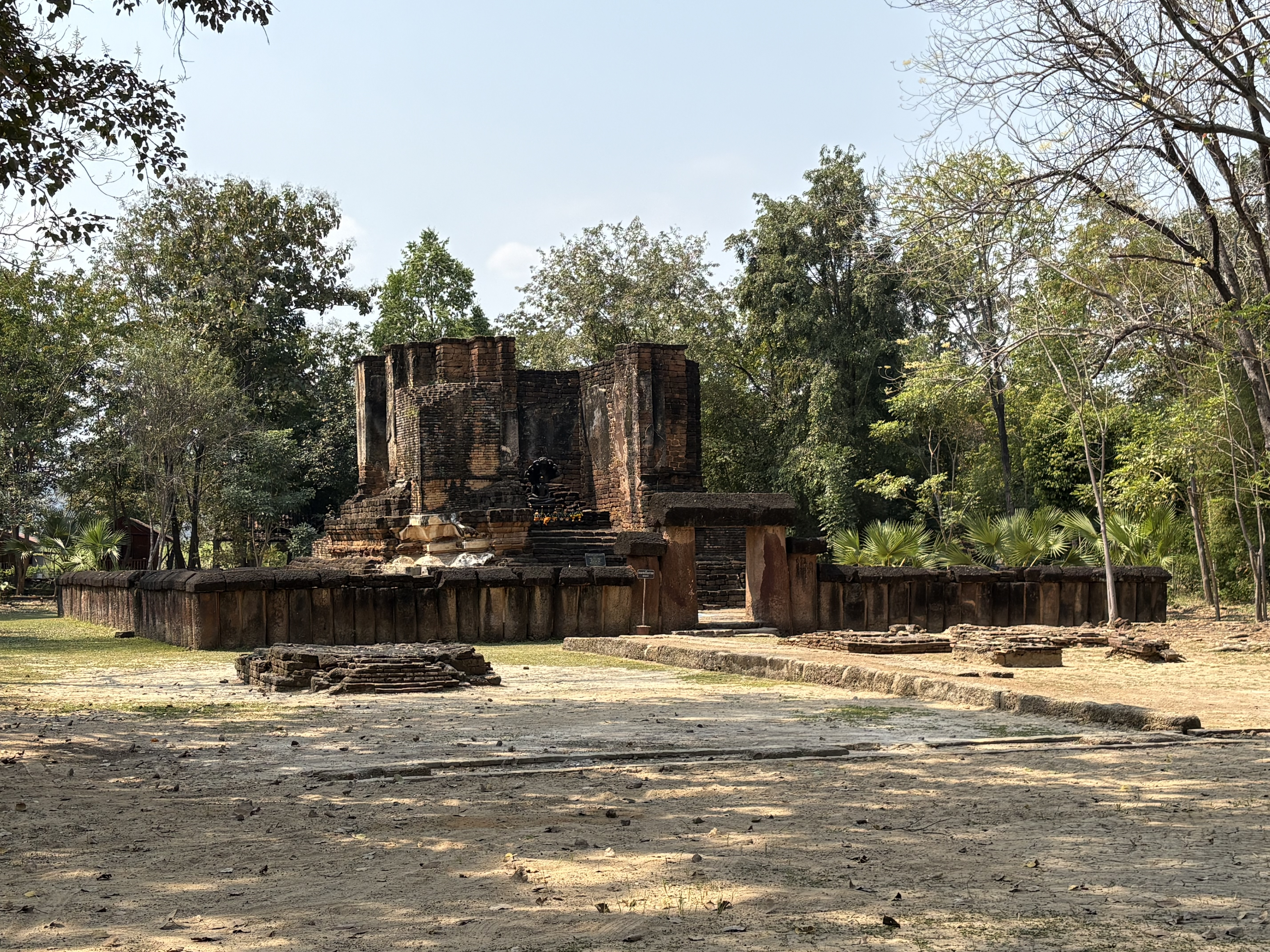
Ruins of Wat Bot Mueang Bang Khlang, today located in Sawankhalok district

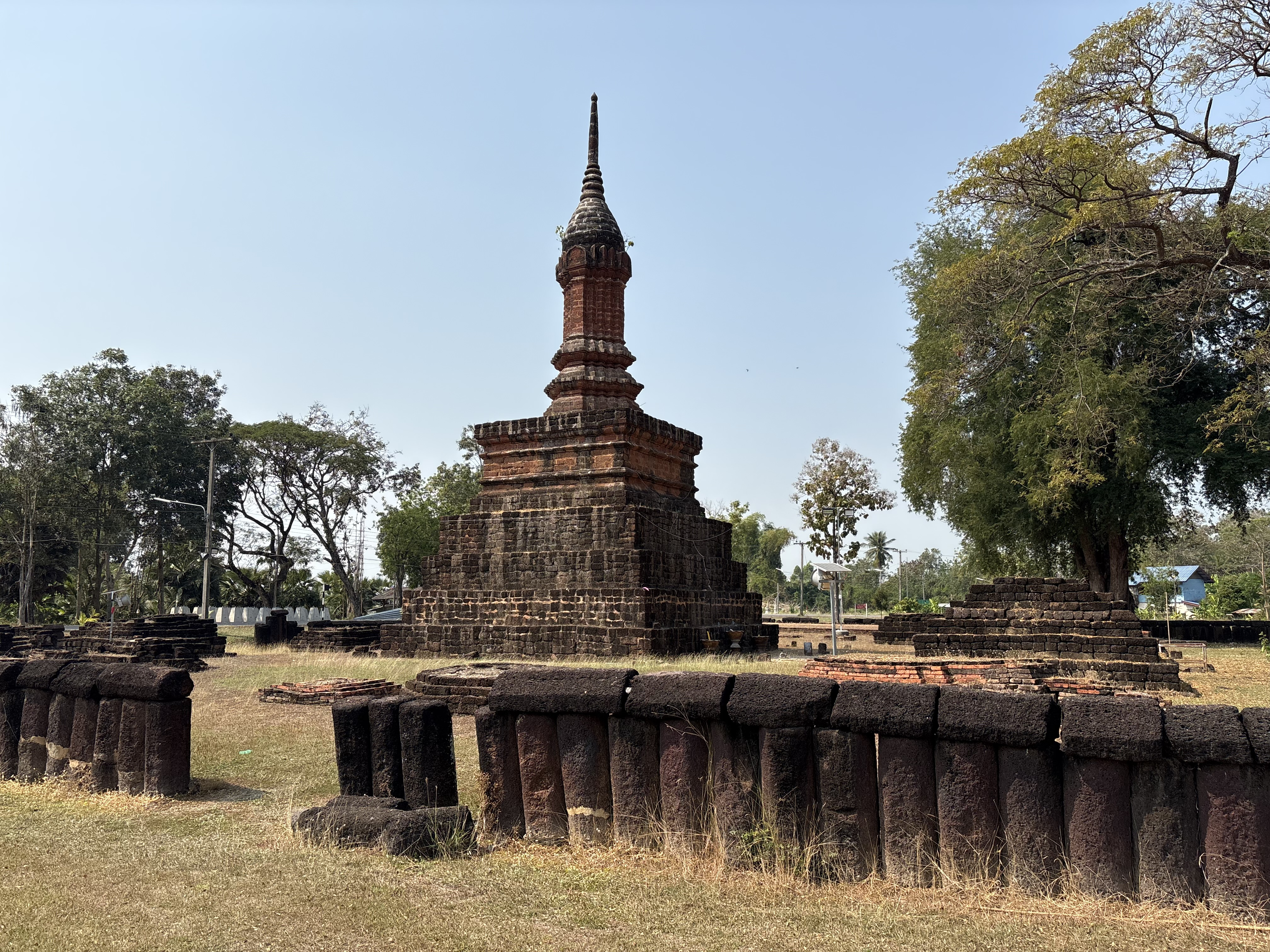
Wat Yai Chai Mongkhon or Wat Bang Khlang, today located in Thung Saliam district

Mueang Bang Khlang (Thai: เมืองบางขลัง, pronounced [mɯ̄a̯ŋ bāːŋ kʰlǎŋ]) is a tambon (sub-district) of Sawankhalok District, Sukhothai Province, upper central Thailand.

== History ==
Mueang Bang Khlang is an ancient town since Sukhothai period (13th century), by Mueang Bang Khlang regarded as an ancient town before the establishment of Sukhothai Kingdom. It is considered a town in contemporary history with the Dvaravati period (7th century to the 11th century).

Mueang Bang Klang has historical significance as mentioned in Wat Si Chum Inscription, also known as Sukhothai Inscription No. 2, by stating that Pho Khun Bang Klang Hao captured Mueang Rat and Mueang Bang Yang before seizing the city of Si Satchanalai, Pho Khun Pha Mueang seized Mueang Bang Khlang. Mueang Bang Khlang is a town in the middle between Si Satchanalai and Sukhothai, causing both warlords to use this place as a base for war against Khom Sabat Khlon Lamphong, a Khmer noble who ruled Sukhothai at that time, the result of the war, Khom Sabat Khlon Lamphong was defeated. Pho Khun Pha Mueang gave Sukhothai to his comrade, Pho Khun Bang Klang Hao. Pho Khun Bang Klang Hao ascended the throne in the name of Si Inthrathit and was the first monarch of the Sukhothai Kingdom. Therefore, this town can be regarded as the official beginning of Thai history.

From further studies, it was found that Mueang Bang Khlang also mentions in the Nakhon Chum Inscription or Sukhothai Inscription No. 3. The Buddha's relics contained in the chedi of Wat Phra That Doi Suthep in Chiang Mai today were brought from here. At present, Mueang Bang Khlang is filled with many ancient artifacts and historical sites, such as ancient monuments in Wat Bot, ancient Bai sema boundary markers, Buddha amulets that are considered magical and sacred, earthenware containers containing human bones, ancient kilns, laterite cutting site, Wat Yai Chai Mongkol, etc., which these Fine Arts Department has registered as national treasures. Most of the ancient monument area located outside the town wall.

Her Royal Highness Princess Maha Chakri Sirindhorn, who is interested in studying Thai history, has visited here twice, the first in 2007 and the second when she presided over the opening ceremony of the Pho Khun Bang Klang Hao and Pho Khun Pha Mueang monument in front of the sub-district municipality office on October 25, 2016.

== Geography ==
Mueang Bang Khlang lies between two cities Si Satchanalai (upper side) and Sukhothai (lower side), it is a small town has a trapezium plan and stretches in the north to the south direction flanked by two water courses, Fa Kradan to the east and Khlong Yang that flows past in the west side. For Fa Kradan, otherwise known as Mae Mok River, a waterway has its origin from Wiang Mok Sub-district, Thoen District, Lampang Province in the northwest of Thailand.

Mueang Bang Khlang is about 18 km (11.2 mi) from downtown Sukhothai and about 15 km (9.3 mi) from Sukhothai Airport. Neighbouring places are (from the north clockwise): Mueang Dong in Si Satchanalai District, Sawankhalok District, Sukhothai Historical Park in the part of Si Samrong District, and Wat Yai Chai Mongkol in the area of Ban Mai Chai Mongkhon Sub-district, Thung Saliam District, respectively.

== Administration ==
The present-day administrative territory Mueang Bang Khlang currently governed by thesaban tambon Mueang Bang Khlang (Mueang Bang Khlang Sub-district Municipality). It is also divided into administrative 13 mubans (village) with a total population of 5,038. Some ruins of the ancient Mueang Bang Khlang are today located across the border in Ban Yai Chai Mongkhon, Thung Saliam district

== See more ==
- Sukhothai Kingdom
