= Thung Saliam district =

Thung Saliam ทุ่งเสลี่ยม
- District
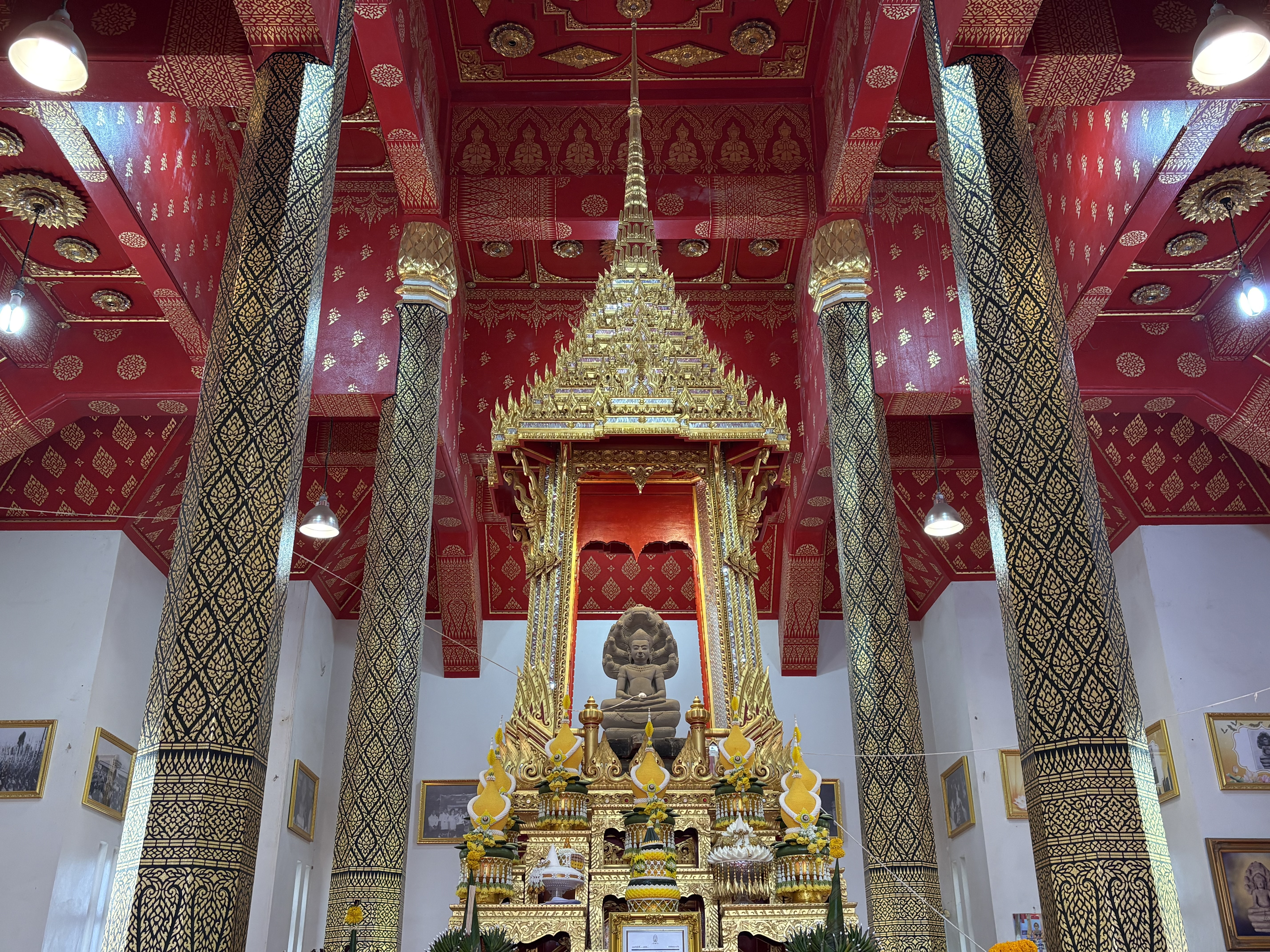
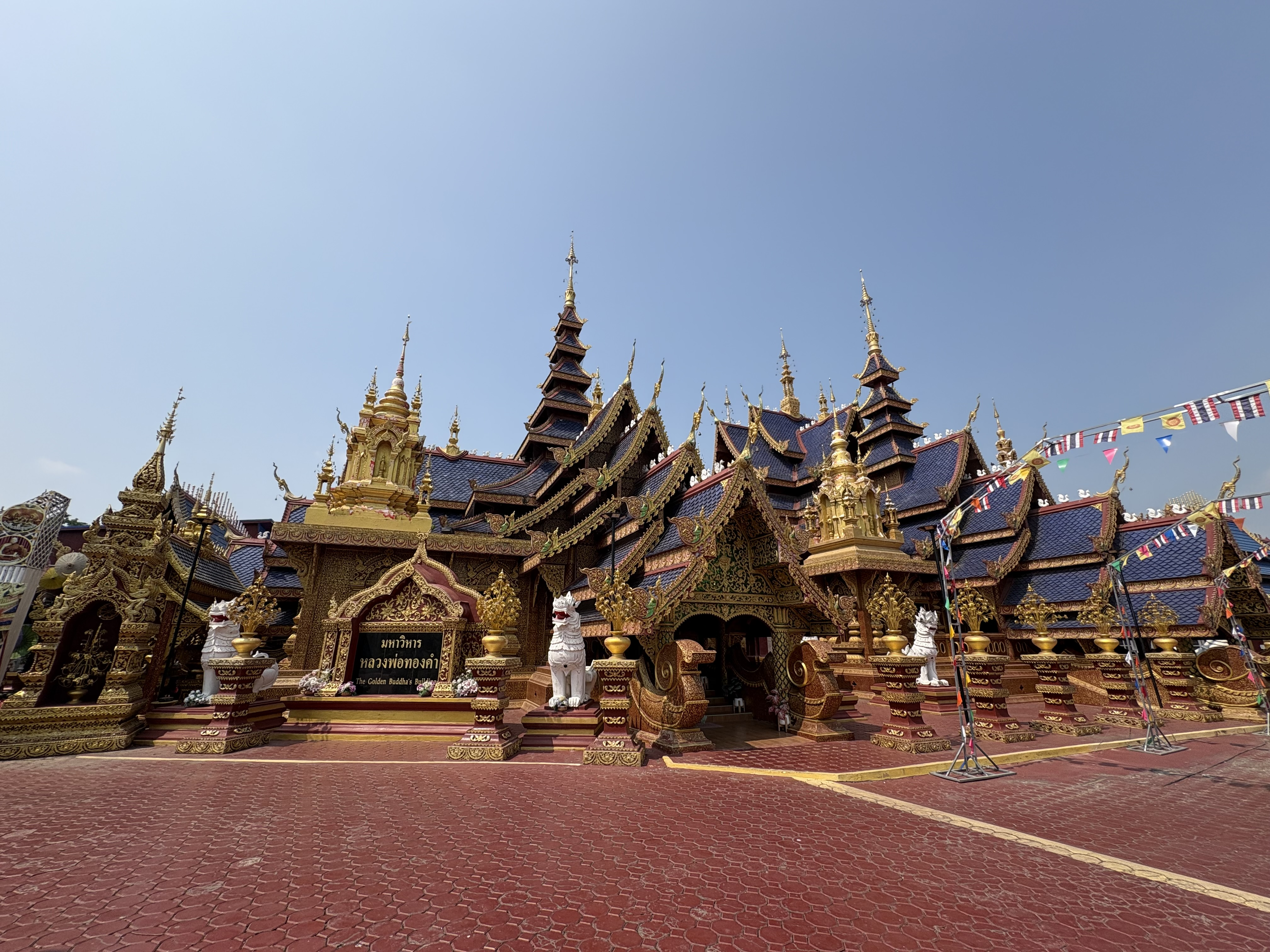
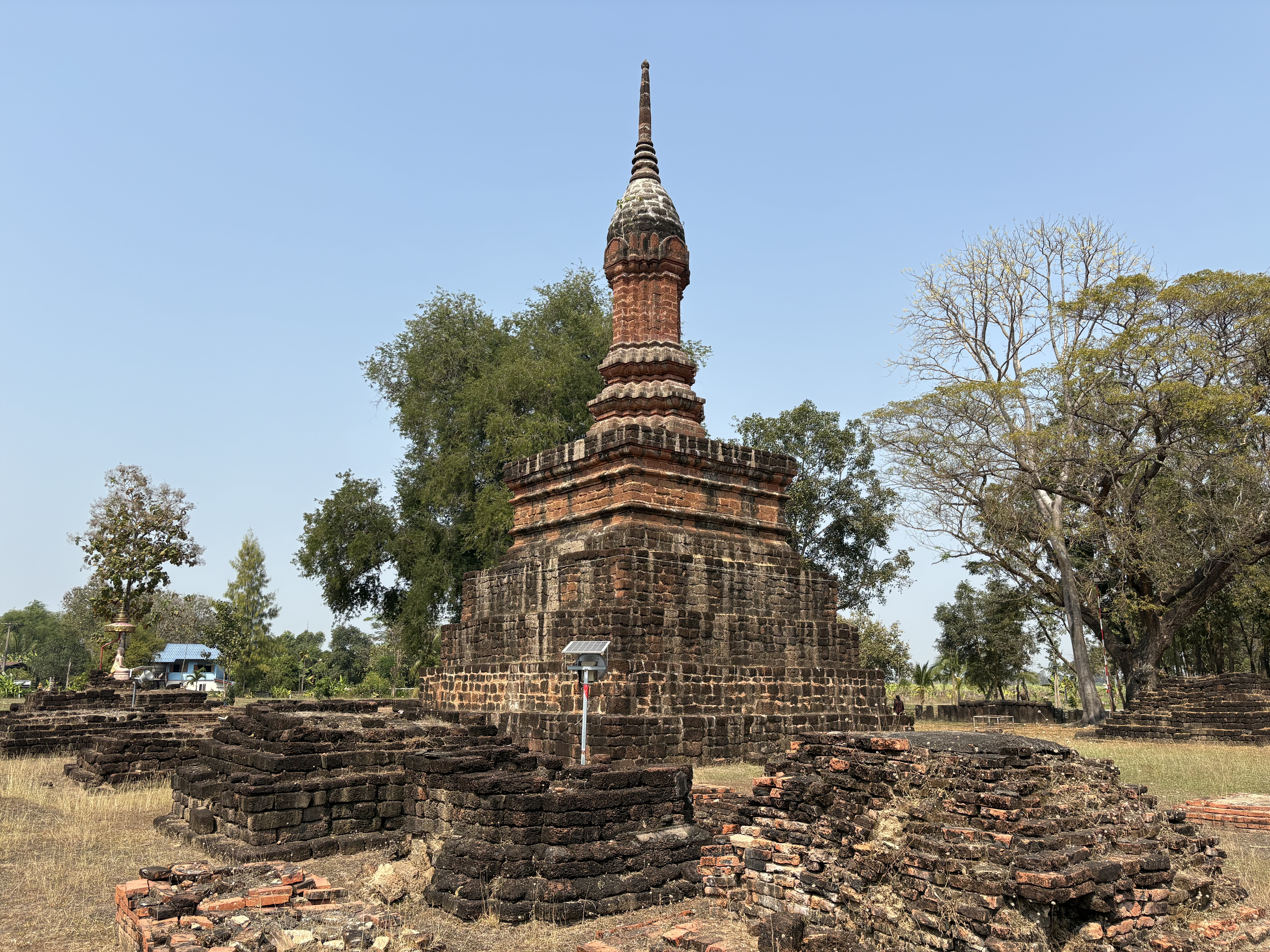
- Luang Pho Sila, enshrined in Wat Thung Saliam Wat Phiphat Mongkhon Wat Yai Chai Mongkhon of Mueang Bang Khlang

- District location in Sukhothai province
- Coordinates: 17°19′15″N 99°33′39″E
- Country: Thailand
- Province: Sukhothai
- Seat: Thung Saliam

Area
  - Total: 569.932 km^{2} (220.052 sq mi)

Population (2009)
  - Total: 49,962
  - Density: 87.66/km^{2} (227.0/sq mi)
- Time zone: UTC+7 (ICT)
- Postal code: 64150
- Geocode: 6409

Thung Saliam (Thai: ทุ่งเสลี่ยม, pronounced [tʰûŋ sā.lìam]; Northern Thai: ᨴ᩵ᩩᨩᨽᩖ᩠᩵ᨿᨾ, pronounced [tôːŋ sā.lǐam]) is a district (amphoe) of Sukhothai province, in the lower north of Thailand.

== Geography ==
Neighboring districts are (from the north clockwise): Si Satchanalai, Sawankhalok, Si Samrong and Ban Dan Lan Hoi of Sukhothai Province, and Thoen of Lampang province.

== History ==
The minor district (king amphoe) Thung Saliam was established in 1957, when the two tambons Thung Saliam and Klang Dong were split off from Sawankhalok District. It was upgraded to a full district in 1959.

Its name Thung Saliam literally means "field of Indian lilacs", because there used to be this kind of mahogany that used to grow abundantly in the area.

== Administration ==
The district is divided into five sub-districts (tambons), which are further subdivided into 59 villages (mubans). The sub-district municipality (thesaban tambon) Thung Saliam covers parts of tambon Thung Saliam, and Khao Kaeo Si Sombun the entire sub-district of the same name. There are a further four tambon administrative organizations (TAO).

No.	Name	Thai	Villages	Pop.
1.	Ban Mai Chai Mongkhon	บ้านใหม่ไชยมงคล	9	7,179
2.	Thai Chana Suek	ไทยชนะศึก	11	8,274
3.	Thung Saliam	ทุ่งเสลี่ยม	13	14,303
4.	Klang Dong	กลางดง	15	12,207
5.	Khao Kaeo Si Sombun	เขาแก้วศรีสมบูรณ์	11	7,999
