= Wat Phra That Doi Suthep =

Buddhist temple in Chiang Mai, Thailand

- วัดพระธาตุดอยสุเทพ
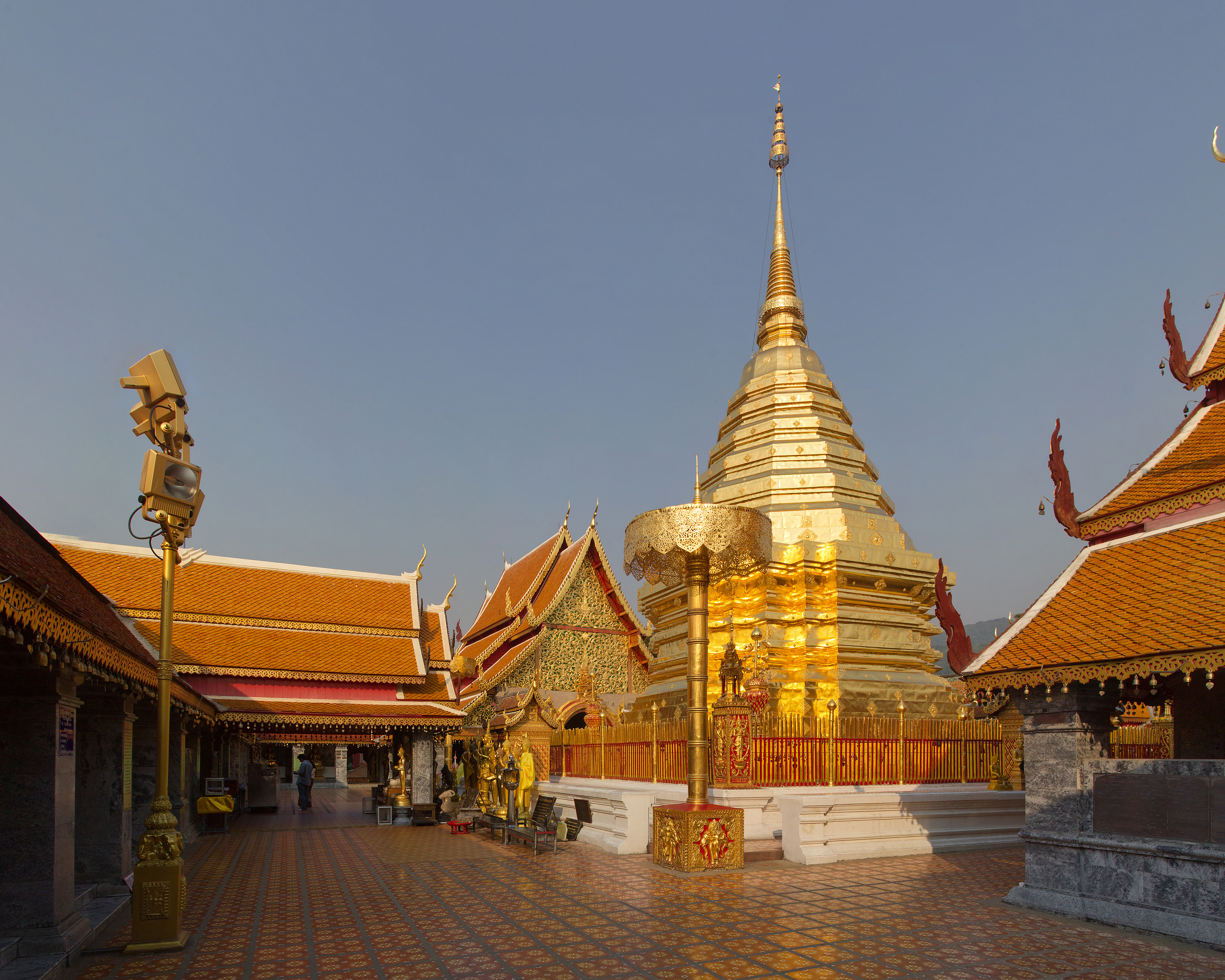

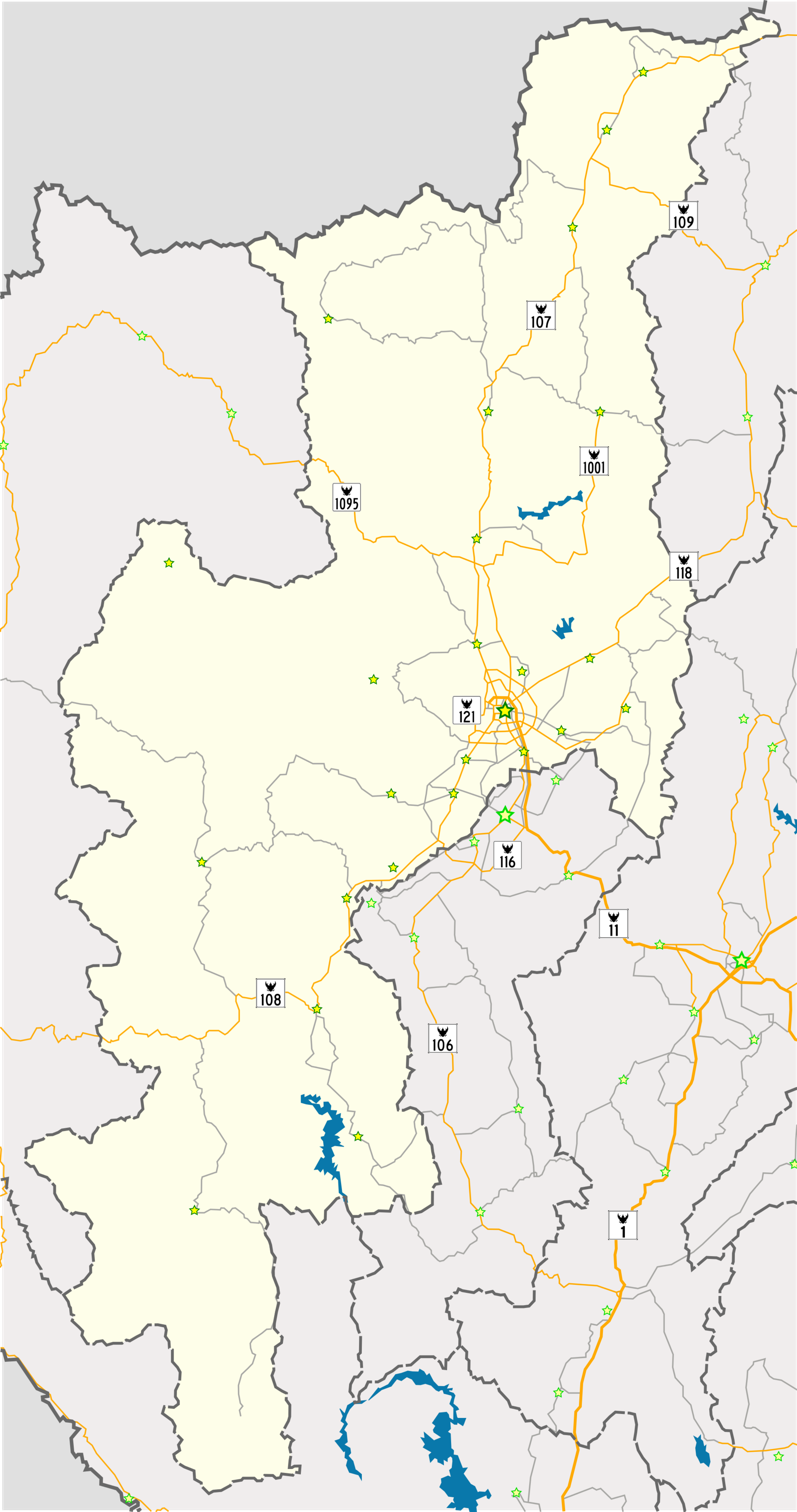
- Location within Chiang Mai Province Location within Thailand

Religion
- Affiliation: Buddhism
- District: Suthep
- Province: Chiang Mai Province
- Region: Northern Thailand
- Status: Active

Location
- Municipality: Chiang Mai
- Country: Thailand
- Coordinates: 18°48′18″N 98°55′18″E

Architecture
- Elevation: 1,050 m (3,445 ft)

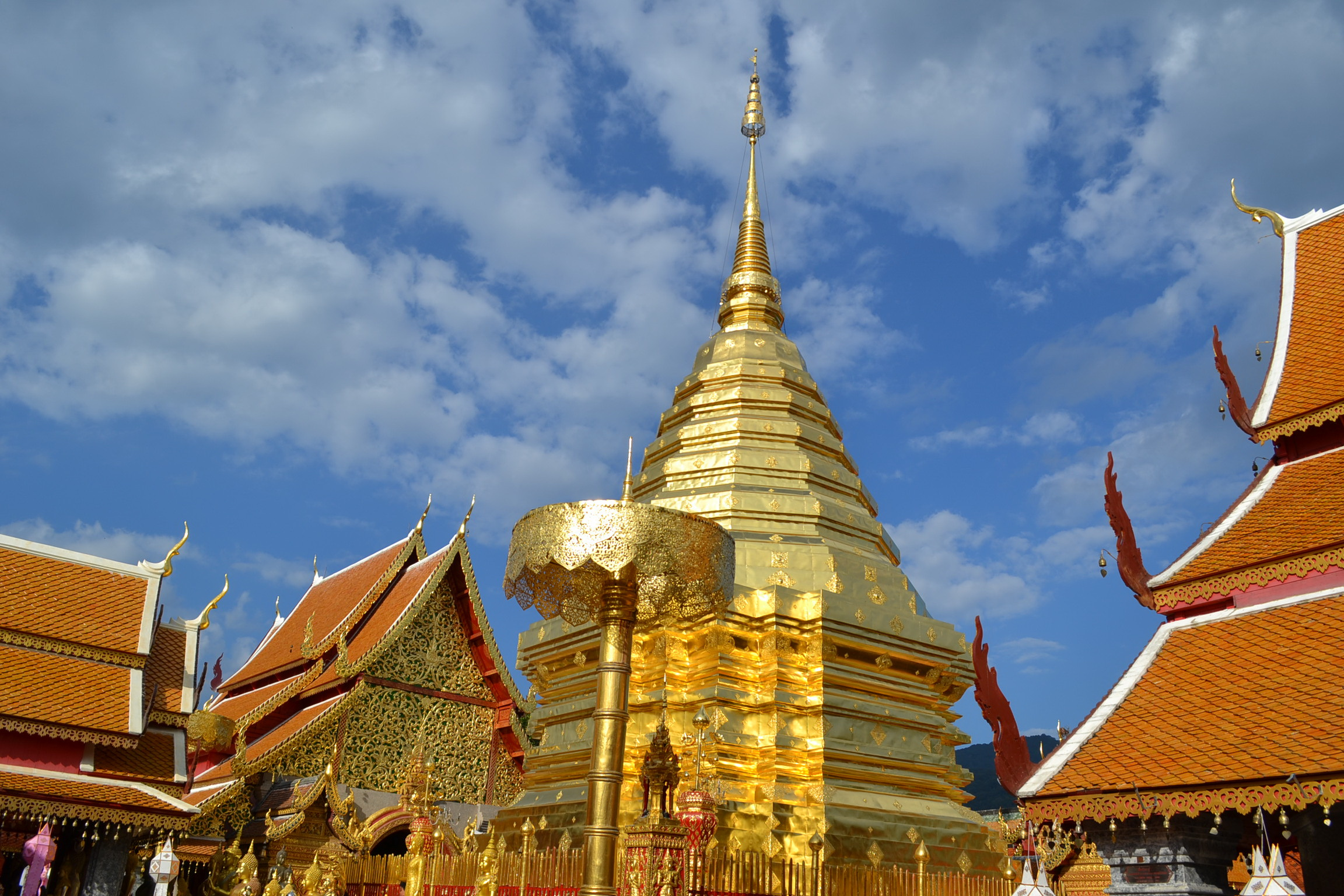
Chedi, Doi Suthep

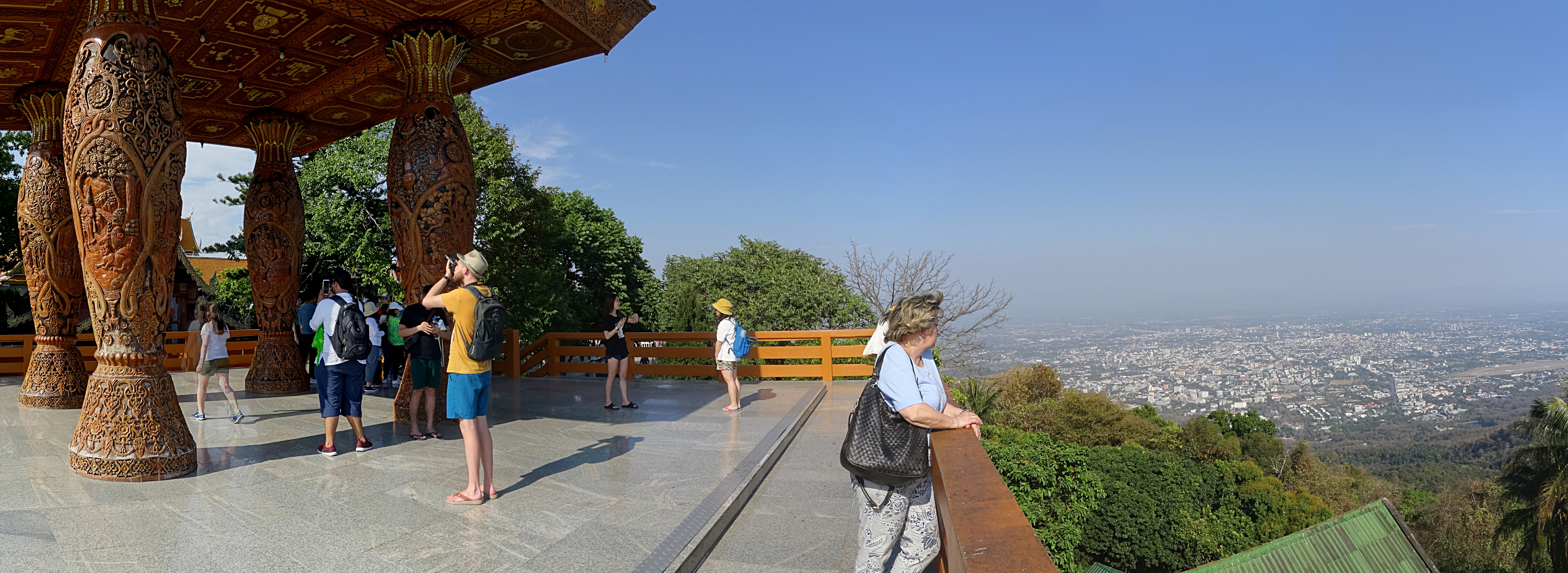
View from the temple of downtown Chiang Mai

Wat Phra That Doi Suthep (Thai: วัดพระธาตุดอยสุเทพ, Thai pronunciation: [wát.pʰráʔ.tʰâːt.dɔ̄ːj.sùʔ.tʰêːp]; Lanna: ᩅᩢ᩠ᨯᩕᨻᨵᩣᩩ᩠ᨲᨯᩬ᩠ᨿᩈᩩᩮᨴᨻᩛ, Lanna pronunciation: [wa̋t.pʰa̋ʔ.tʰâːt.dɔ̄ːj.súʔ.tê:p]) is a Theravada Buddhist temple (wat) in Chiang Mai Province, Thailand. The temple is often referred to as "Doi Suthep" although this is actually the name of the mountain where it is located. It is a sacred site to many Thai people. The temple is 15 kilometres (9.3 mi) from the city of Chiang Mai and situated at an elevation of 1,073 meters. From the temple, impressive views of downtown Chiang Mai can be seen.

== History ==
The original founding of the temple remains a legend and there are a few varied versions. The temple is said to have been founded in 1383 when the first stupa was built. Over time, the temple has expanded, and been made to look more extravagant with many more holy shrines added. A road to the temple was first built in 1935.

=== White elephant legend ===
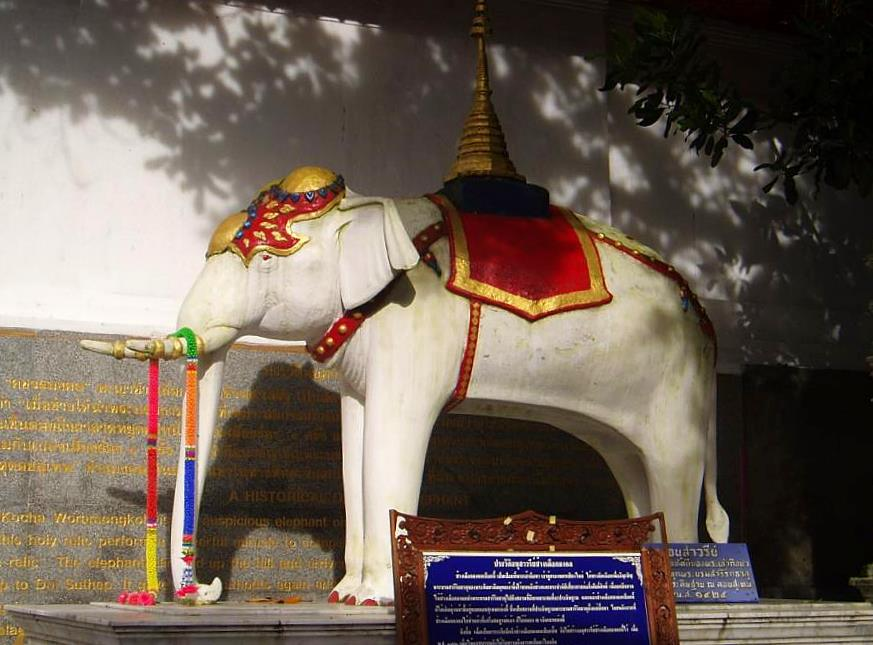
White elephant shrine

According to legend, a monk named Sumanathera from the Sukhothai Kingdom had a dream. In this vision he was told to go to Pang Cha (Mueang Bang Khlang sub-district) and look for a relic. Sumanathera ventured to Pang Cha and found a bone. Many claim it was Gautama Buddha's shoulder bone. The relic displayed magical powers: it glowed, it was able to vanish, it could move and replicate itself. Sumanathera took the relic to King Lue Thai (Maha Thammaracha II), who ruled Sukhothai. The eager Lue Thai made offerings and hosted a ceremony when Sumanathera arrived. However, the relic displayed no abnormal characteristics, and the king, doubtful of the relic's authenticity, told Sumanathera to keep it.

King Kue Na (Dhammikaraja) of Lan Na heard of the relic and bade the monk to bring it to him. In 1368, with Lue Thai's permission, Sumanathera took the relic to what is now Lamphun, in northern Thailand. Once there, the relic broke into two pieces. The smaller piece was enshrined at Wat Suan Dok. The other piece was placed by the king on the back of a white elephant which was released into the jungle. The elephant is said to have climbed up Doi Suthep, at that time called Doi Aoy Chang (Sugar Elephant Mountain), stopped, trumpeted three times, then dropped dead. This was interpreted as an omen. King Kue Na immediately ordered the construction of a temple at the site.

The name of the Temple (Wat Phra That Doi Suthep) actually explains what the temple has. Phra entails of an honorific Buddha image, and That means a relic. Combining the two tells that there is a relic of Buddha's in the sanctity of the Wat, and in this case it's half of Buddha's shoulder bone. The location of the shoulder bone relic is to be found in the rounded portion of the Chedi right above the octagonal redented section and below the ringed section.

== Visiting the temple ==
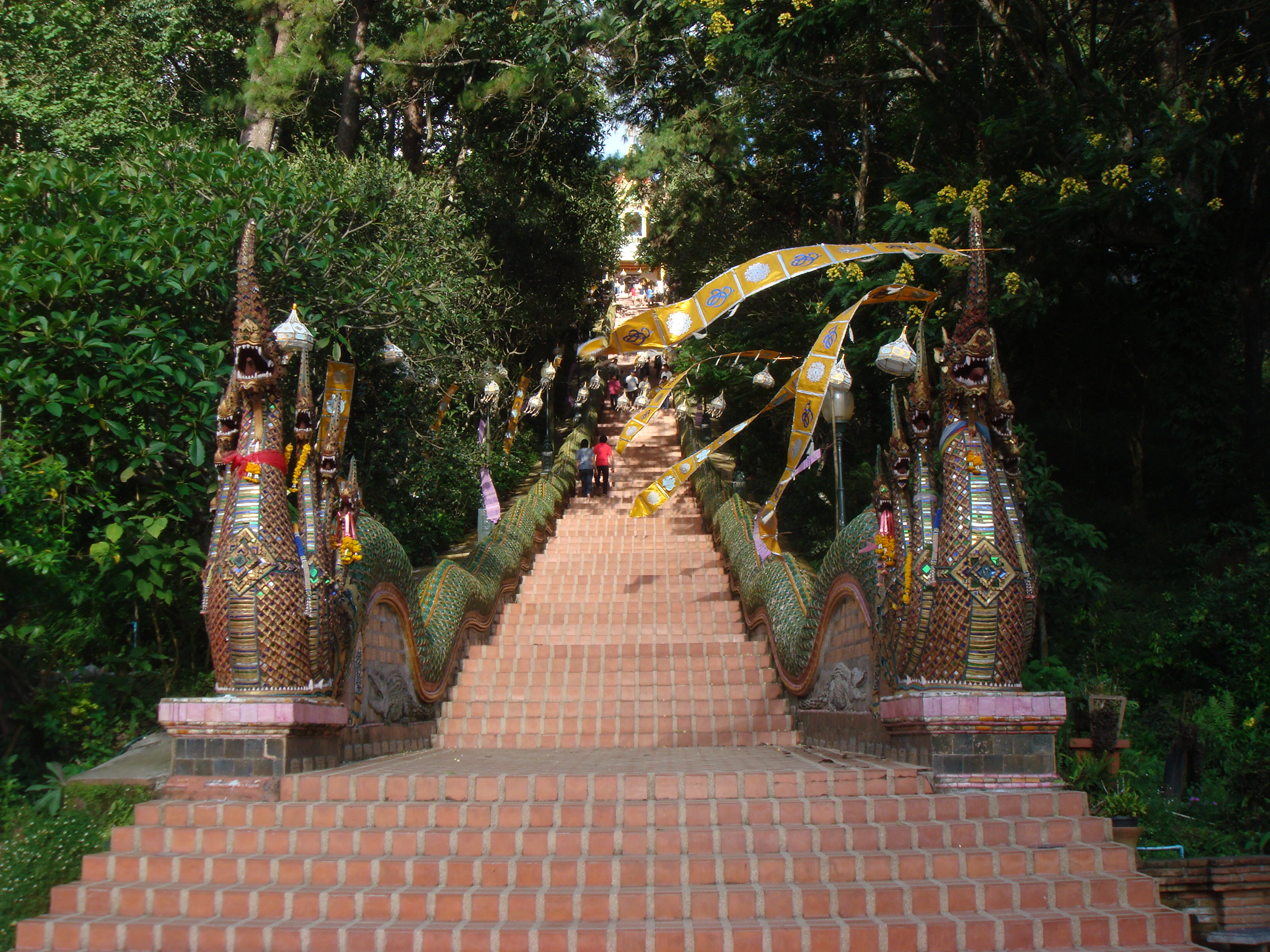
Stairs to Wat Doi Suthep

The wat can be reached by road from Chiang Mai. From the car park at the temple's base visitors can climb 309 steps to reach the pagodas or take a tram. It's also possible to hike up to the temple from the city following the Monk's Trail. The temple is wheelchair accessible via a funicular railway and a series of very steep ramps.

Once inside the temple grounds visitors must be appropriately dressed and must remove footwear. The original gold plated chedi is the most holy area of the temple grounds. Within the site are pagodas, statues, bells, a museum, and shrines. Aspects of the wat draw from both Buddhism and Hinduism. There is a model of the Emerald Buddha and a statue of the Hindu God Ganesh. Views of Chiang Mai can be seen on the far side of the temple.

== Architecture of the site ==
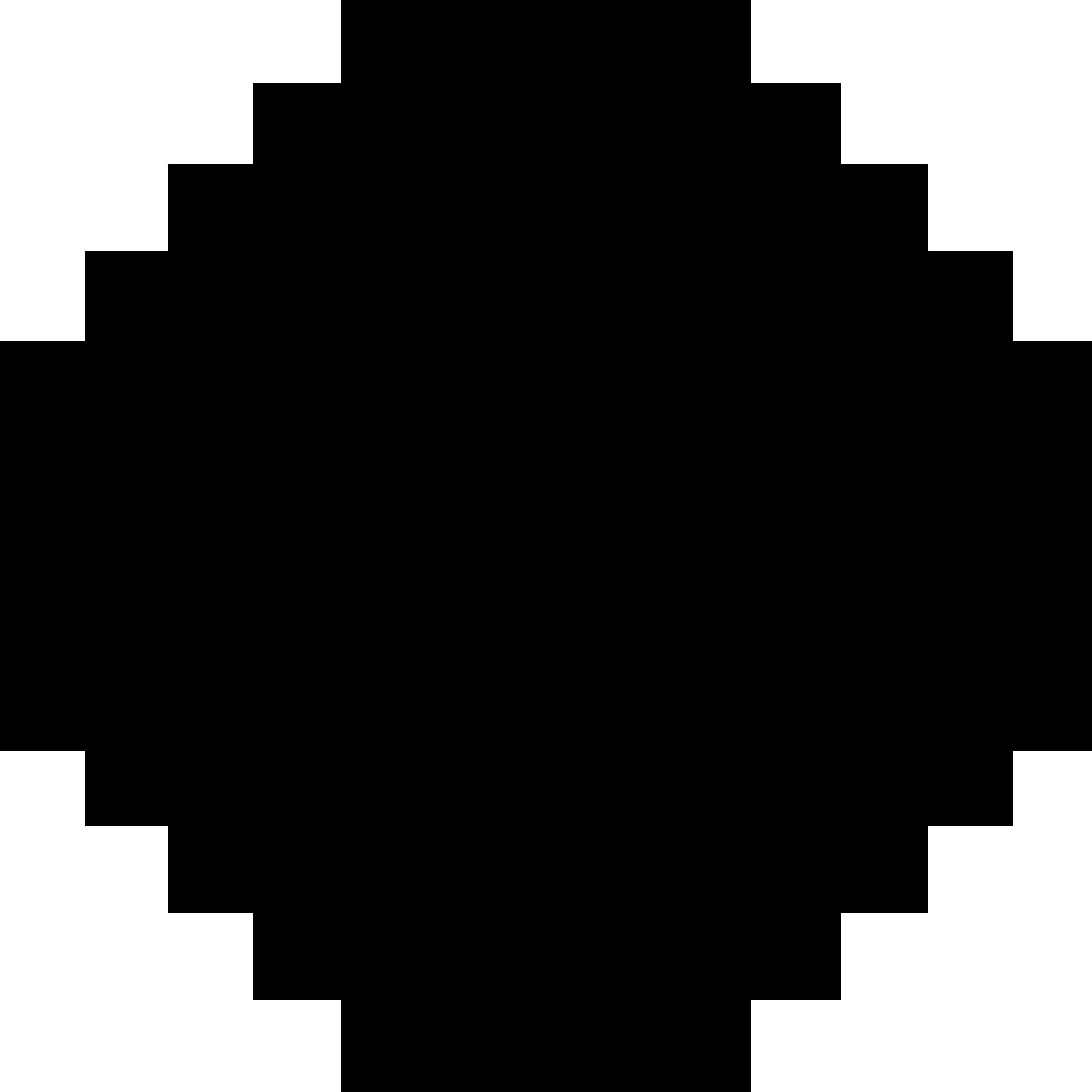
Top-down diagram of the octagonal redented base of the chedi

Wat Phra That Doi Suthep is a gorgeously planned Wat with a story to tell about Buddhism. Once the Naga lined steps are surmounted (the longest Naga balustrade in Thailand), the first site one sees is the White elephant statue commemorating the story behind the Wat placement. The closest entrance to the inner ring is to the left, on the North side of the complex. The immediate view is one of the chedi towering 24 meters (79 feet). This gold plated spire is very typical of Northern Thailand chedi with its heightened redented octagonal base, ringed spire, smooth spire, and the tiered chatra at the top. The structure is greatly influenced by Sukhothai art; however, the chatra isn't a Thai influence, but rather an aspect that came from two centuries of Burmese occupation. The tiered and angular shape of the chedi is found all around Thailand is an aspect of Buddhist architecture. The tiers represent the level of heavens that one must ascend in order to achieve Nirvana as well as the hierarchy associated with a monarchy. The angular shape and sloping appearance are more related to the feeling that Thai architects wished to relate. In Threvada Buddhism, the main focus is to rid oneself of unwholesomeness, and to do that there is a focus on peace, lightness, and floating. If the chedi was just its plain shapes of an octagon and triangle, it would appear dense and static. The redented look, near parabolic slope, and golden cover of the chedi creates a feeling of weightlessness of the structure.

This same concept can be seen with the Wihans. The weightlessness for the wihans and the surround structures comes primarily from the roof aesthetic. The aesthetic that comes into play here is the toying of geometry and separating similar shapes. This particular wihan has a two tiered roof with the different sections being at different angles. The lower tier is at a flatter angle to replicate a stouter more tense look, while the next tier is at a quite steep angle that creates a more elevated and relaxed look. This separation is to represent the freedom from attachment which is the ultimate goal of Buddhism. The white stucco and incredibly ornate pediment greatly assist with this lightweight feel and separation, but the roof provides the most dynamic movement of the building due to its size and composure. The pediments are typically the most decorated parts of the building that express the grandeur and status of the temple. At each corner of the roof tiers there's a flat ornamental Naga and the large pointed pieces at the peak of the roof are called chofas.

The same Buddhist theme from the exterior also makes its way to the interior with many different factors. The first is that the walls and columns all slant inward to the center of the building. This is to help with the structural integrity of the building, but to also make the feeling of the room ascending. The interior is also greatly decorated with murals all over the walls. The murals are typically the story of Buddha's life and travels but also include Hindu aspects as well. The inside is of the building is typically quite dark because the main lighting comes from the narrow vertical windows and the fact that the murals and all of the indoor decoration are darker materials. The narrowness of the windows is for structural concerns, but to also help with the ascension feel because they are actually trapezoids that are wider at the base. The interiors at Wat Phra That Doi Suthep contains myriads of Buddha statues that come in all different styles and materials just like the outside courtyard.

The layout of the complex shows bi axial symmetry around the chedi with the main and small wihans slightly off the east–west cardinal plane. The cardinal directions are important to Buddhism and it is said that if there isn't a body of water around, like in this case, then the main wihan should face the rising sun. This explains why the main wihan is on the west side of the complex. Outside of the square courtyard the placement and design of the surroundings is due to the topography of the mountaintop. The viewing spot to see Chiang Mai is a propped cantilever with around a 15-foot drop over the edge. Even looking at the wooden wihan and the monk's residence further down the hill, they both exist on the north–south plane pointing towards the chedi. Everything on the site points inward towards the iconic chedi indicating its significance to the wat.

== Issues with politics and religion ==
Wat Phra That Doi Suthep is considered to be one of the most sacred pilgrimage spots in Thailand due to its relic as well as the influence from Chiang Mai being the center of the Lanna Kingdom back in the 14th century. In fact the wat can get 120,000 visitors per month, with the numbers being higher during holidays like Songkhan and more especially Visakha Bucha Day when local people climb the mountain and sleep on the esplanade of the temple to commemorate the birth of the Buddha. Most of these visitors are from Thailand, Singapore, China, and India and they consider themselves "pilgrim-tourist" because they pay homage to the site but also indulge on the surrounding attractions. Tourism is always going to be a huge part of the wat and because of the economics of this, political actions will always come around. This first begins with Khruba Siwichai who oversaw building the road in 1935. He was a huge part of the Buddhist culture in this region because of his great merit and dedication to the culture but also the building projects he took on. At the turn of the 20th century, the Thai Buddhist authorities were attempting to centralize and integrate the loosely conformed northern Buddhist leaders to more of a national hierarchical order. Siwichai was one of the main speakers against this and became a symbol of the religious and societal freedom of the northern culture. His spirit could be seen again in the 1980s when there was talk of a cable car being installed to the wat instead of using the road. This caused a huge debate and put into question the sanctity of the wat. Part of the Buddhist culture is the pilgrimage to wats and by introducing this device, would it take away from that aspect? The government and the locals battled long and hard over who it would truly benefit and the religious aspects, but eventually the locals rallying support led to the plan being scrapped.

== Gallery ==
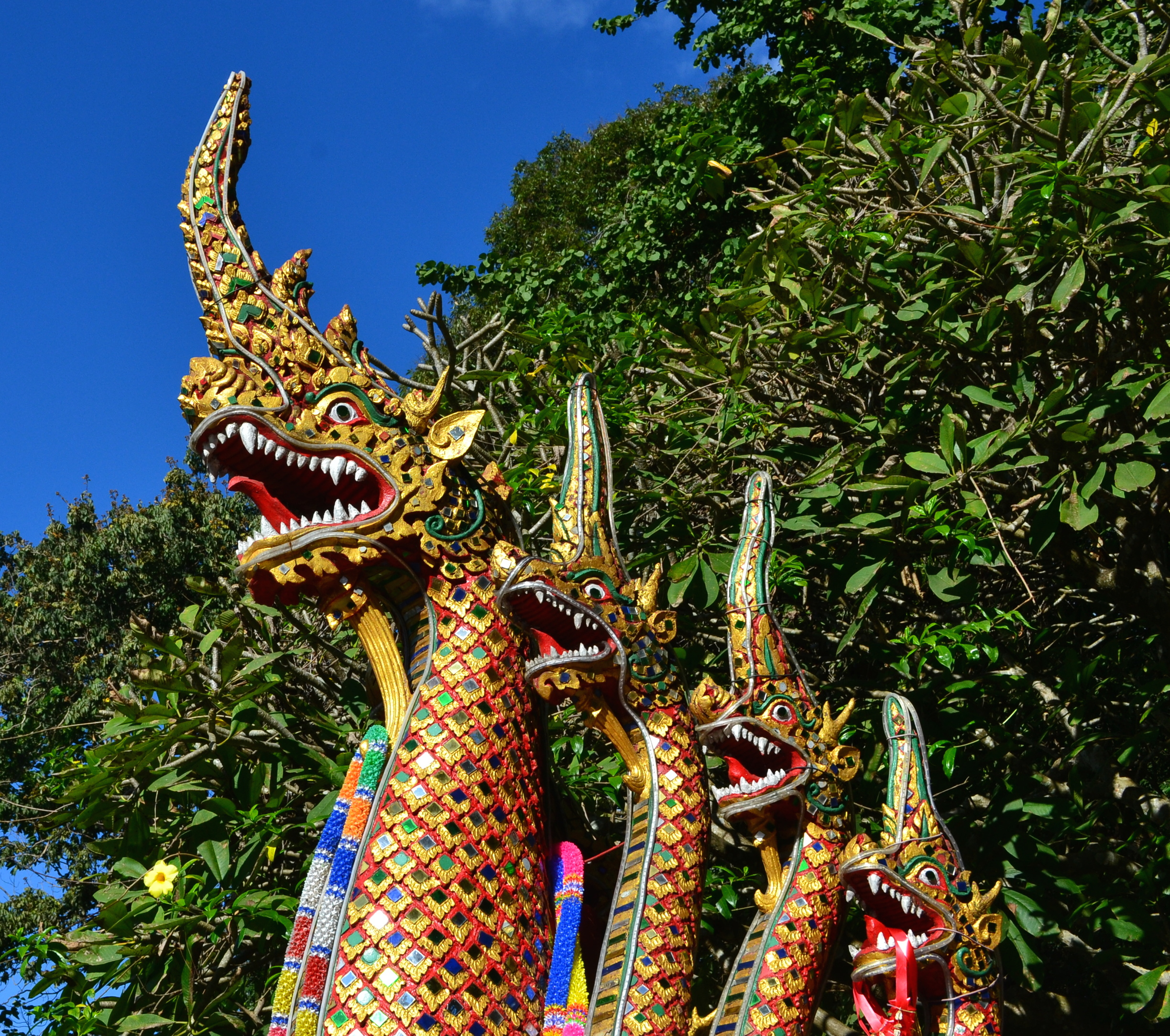
Naga on gates of the temple

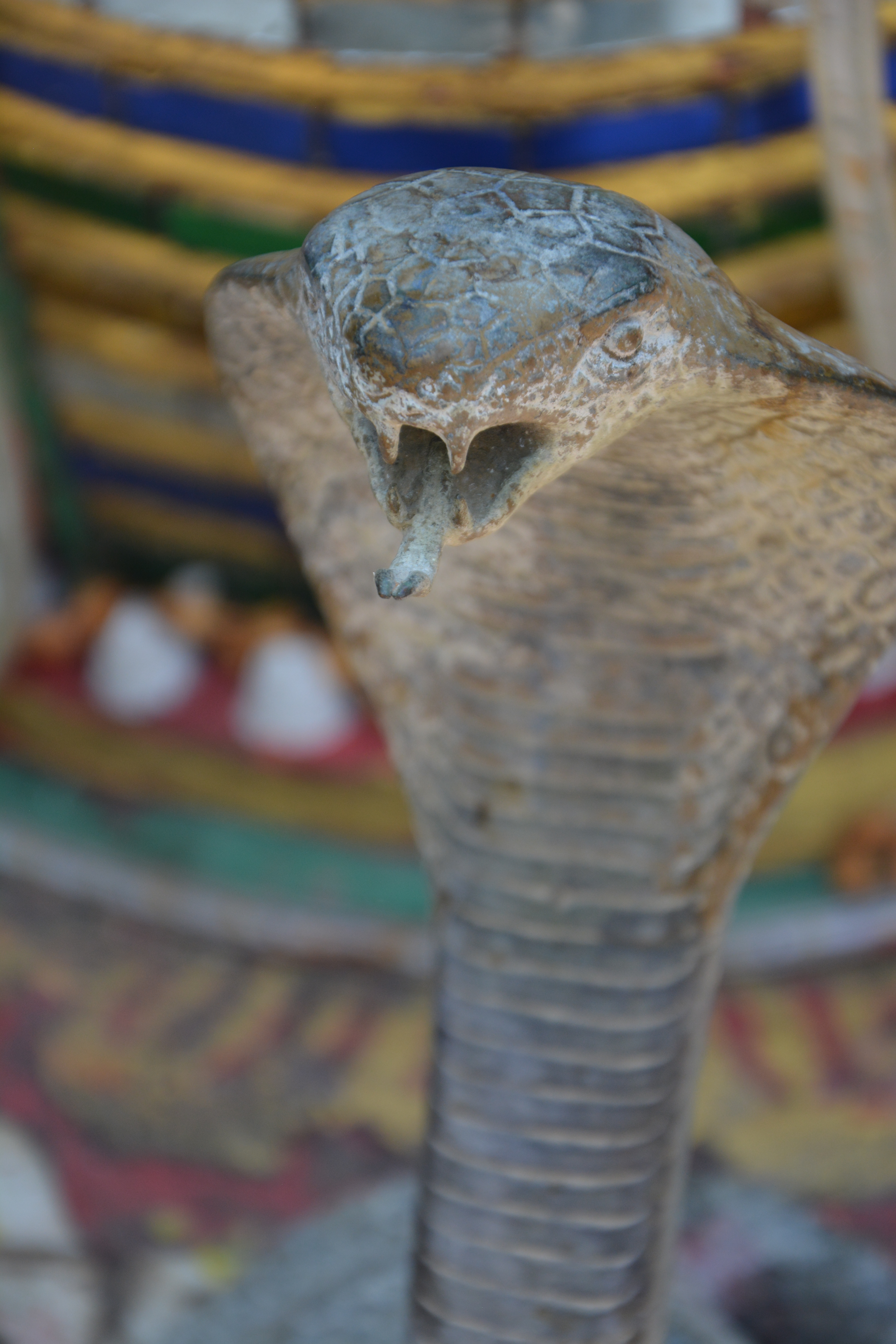
Stone snake near the gates

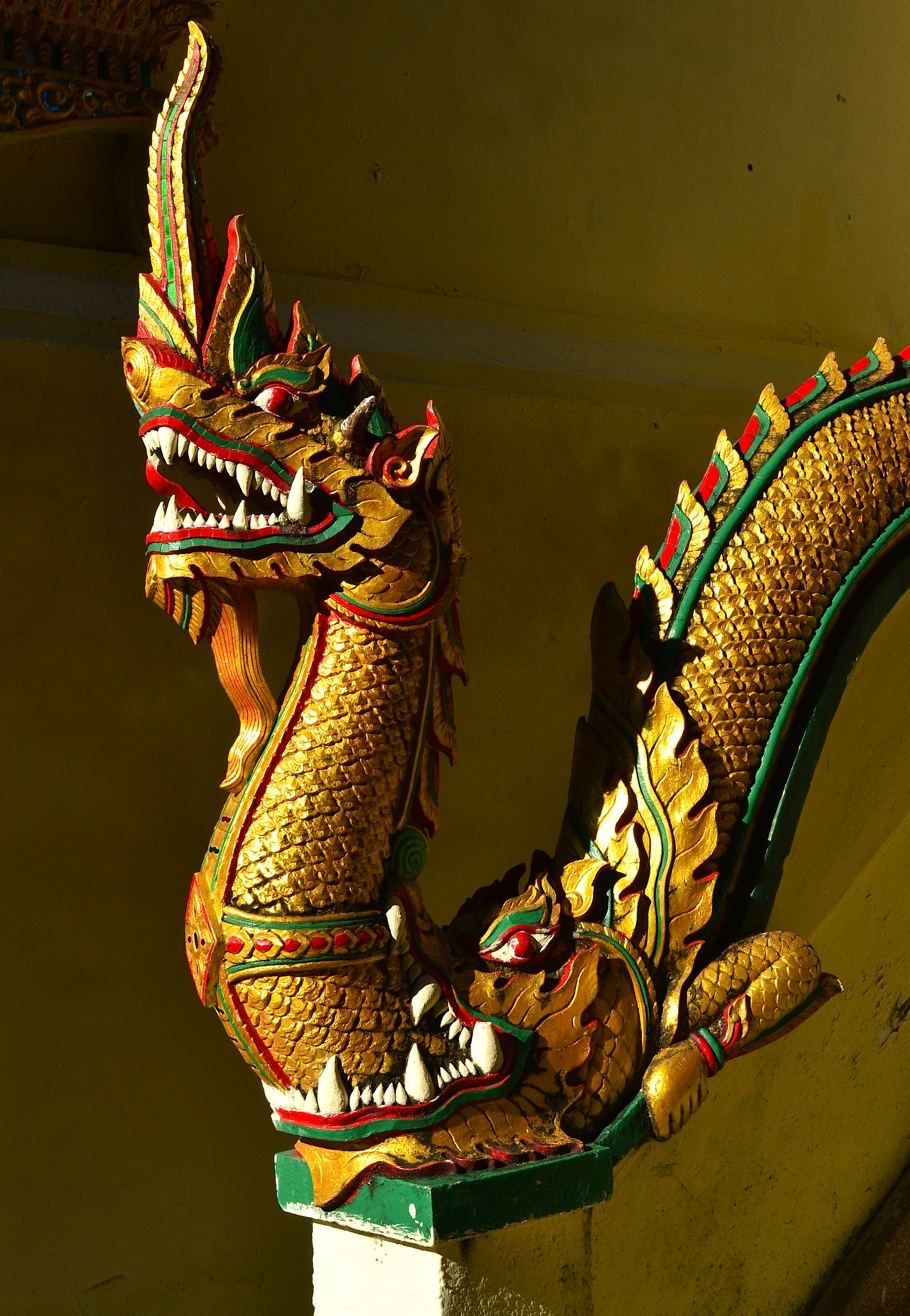
Naga decoration

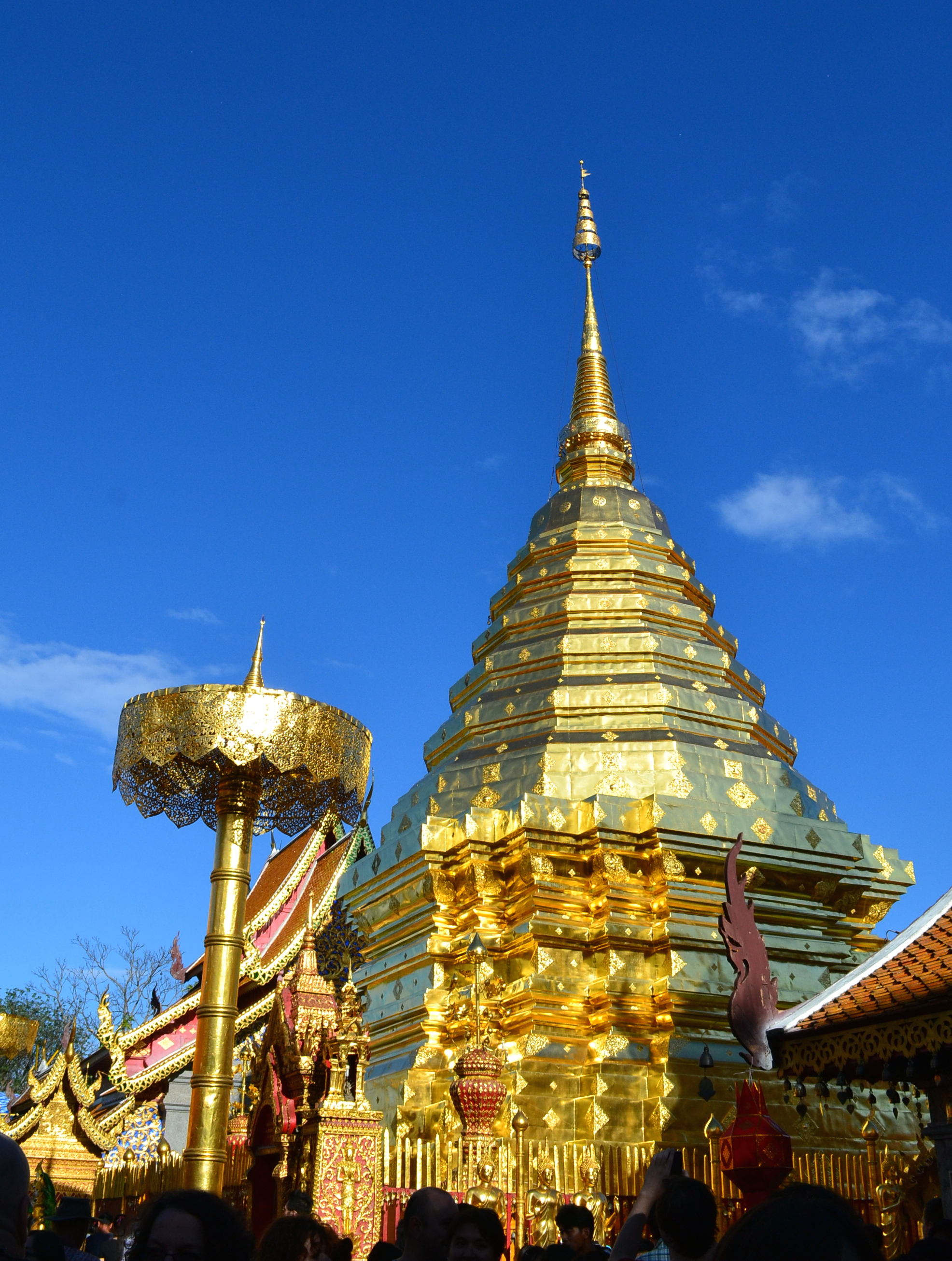
Golden mount at the temple

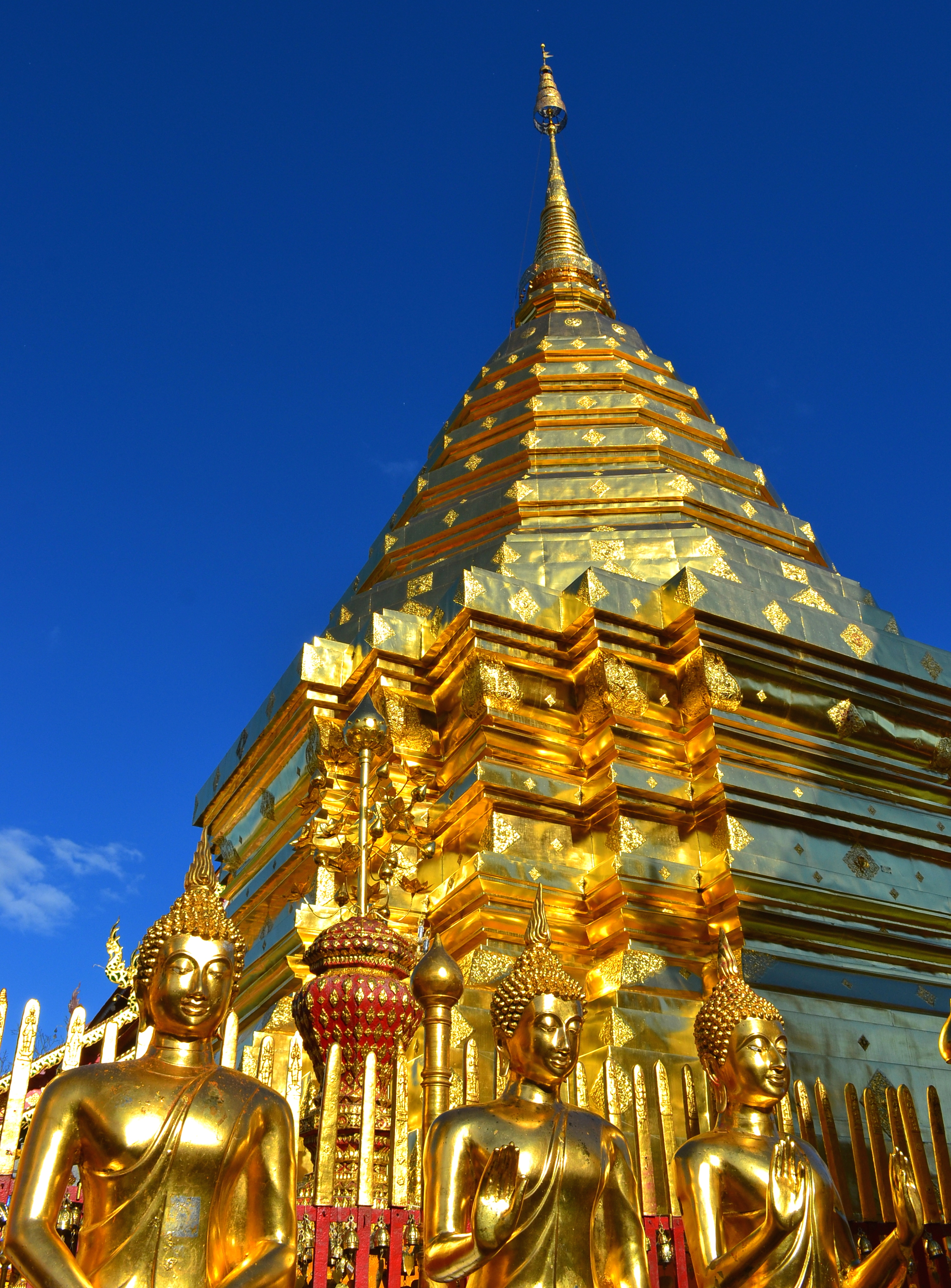
Golden mount at the temple

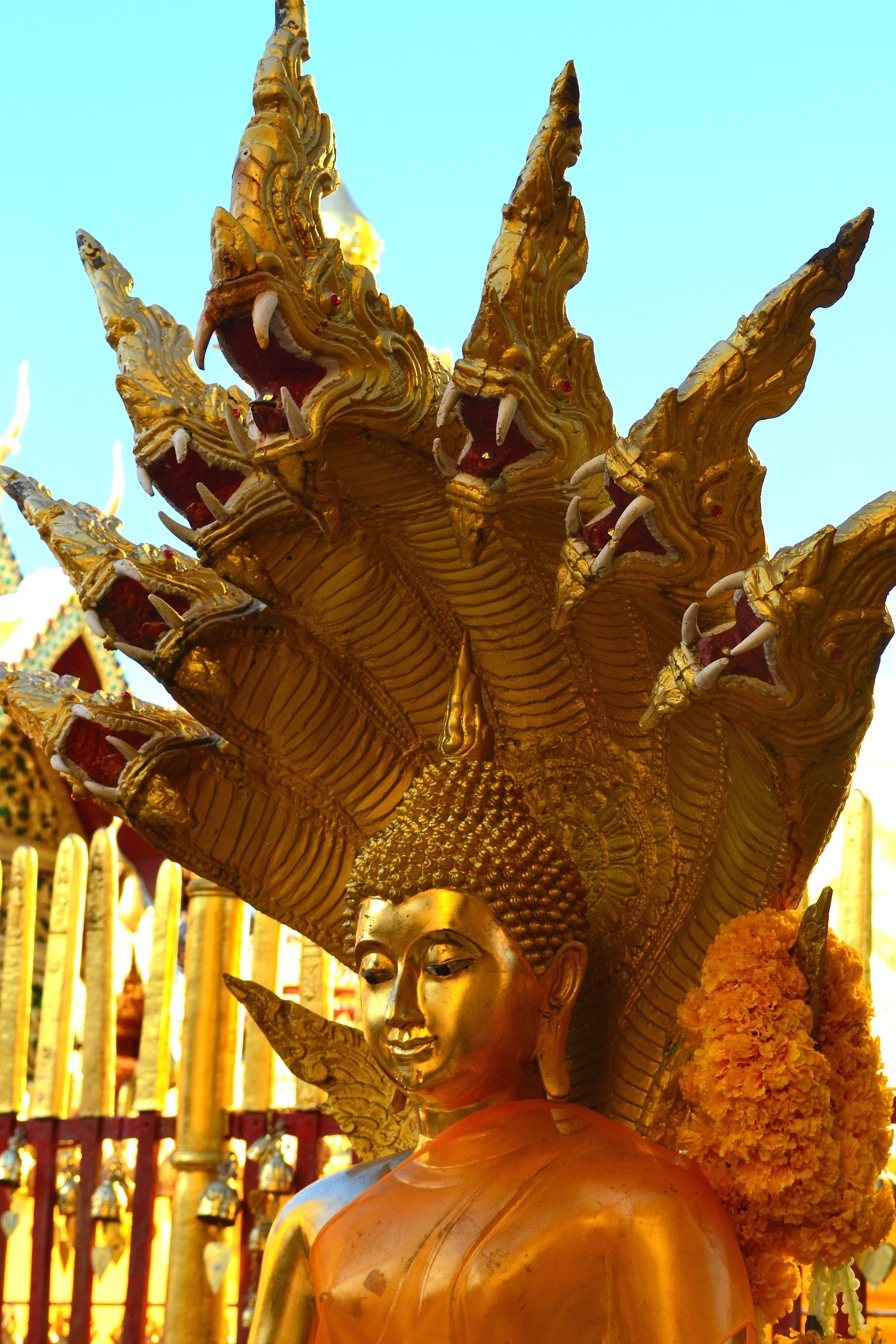
Golden Buddha statue at the temple

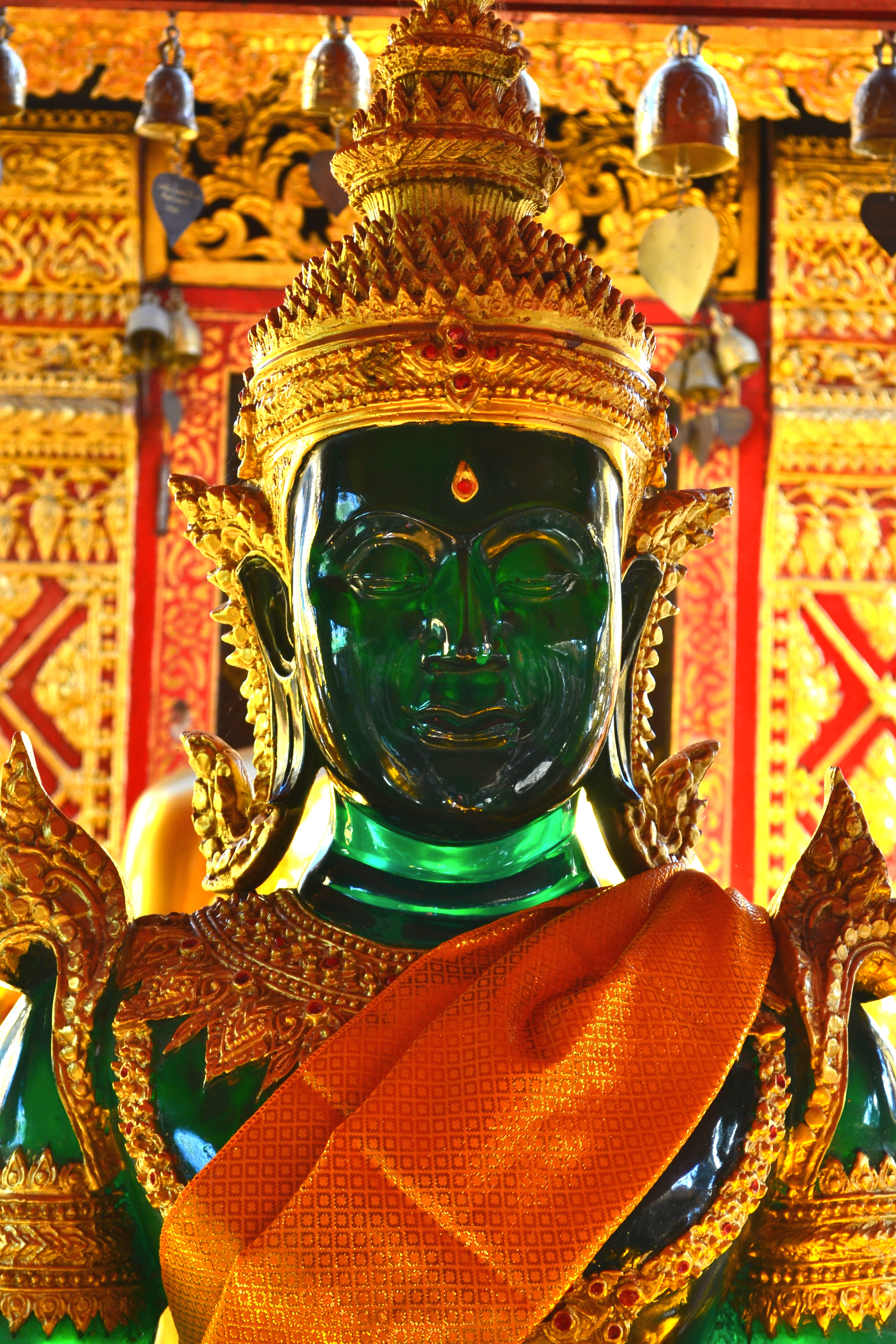
Green glass Buddha statue

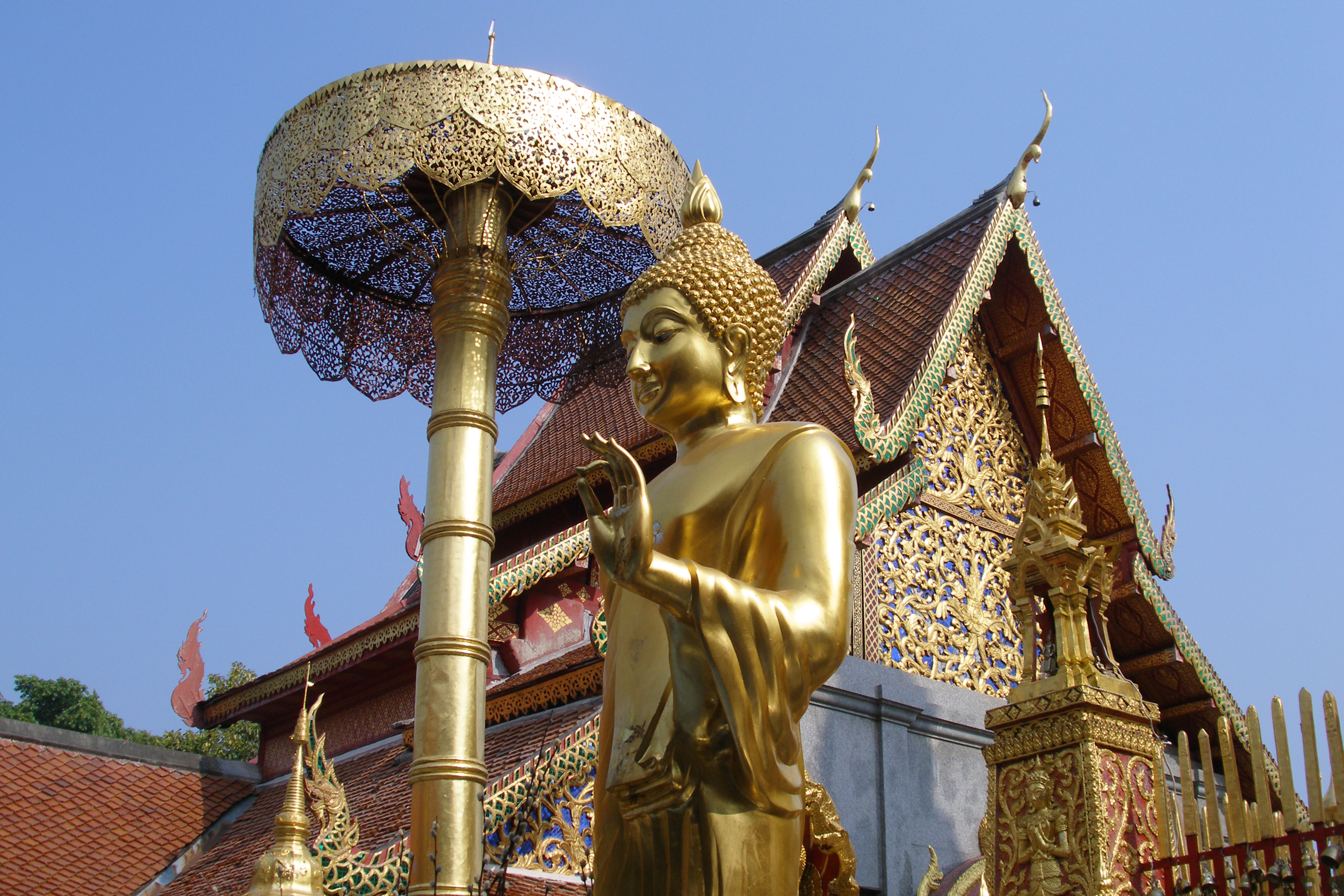
Golden Buddha

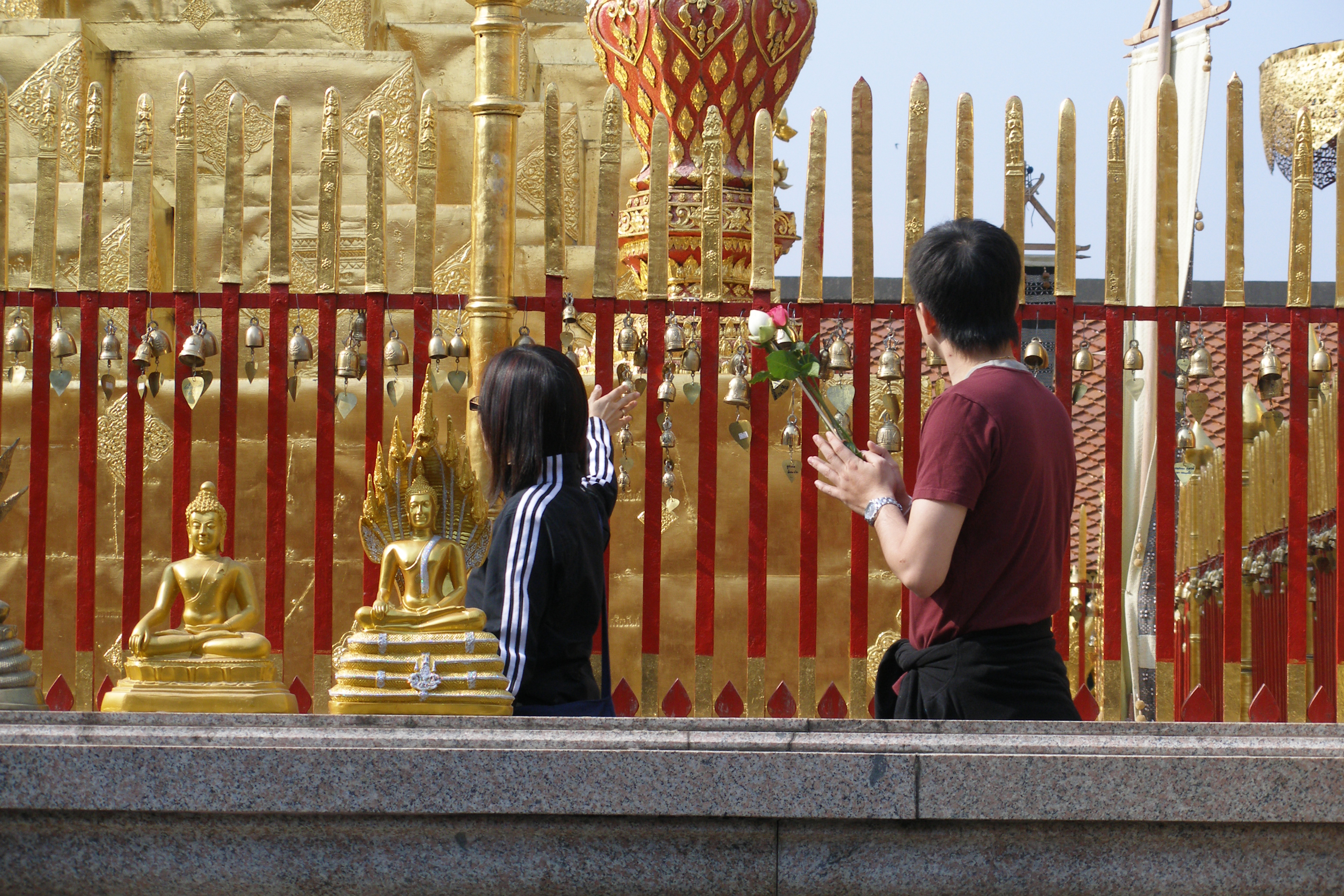
Circumambulation

== See also ==
- Buddhist temples in Thailand
- Doi Suthep–Pui National Park
- Thai Temple Art and Architecture
