= Si Samrong district =

Si Samrong ศรีสำโรง
- District
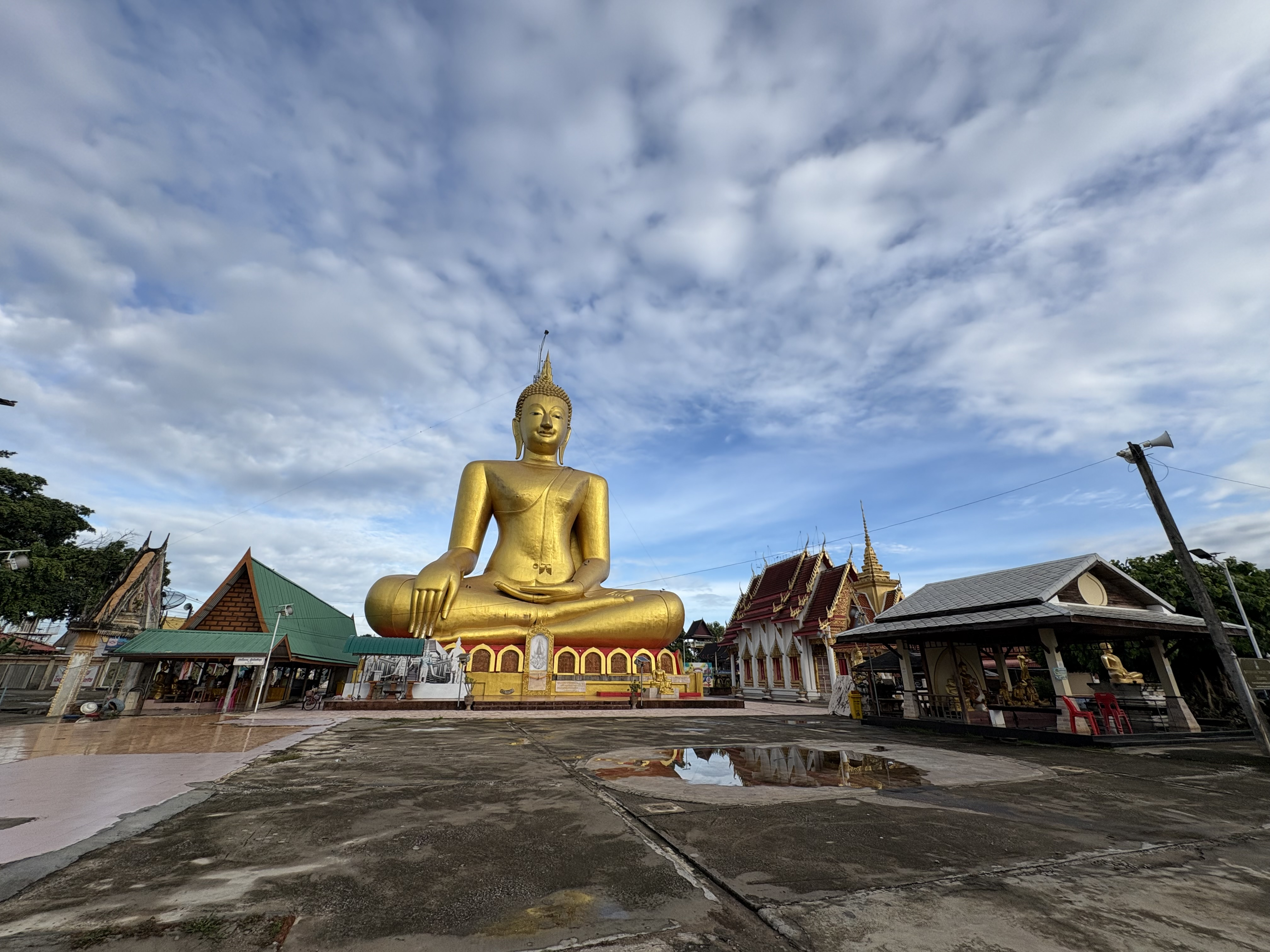
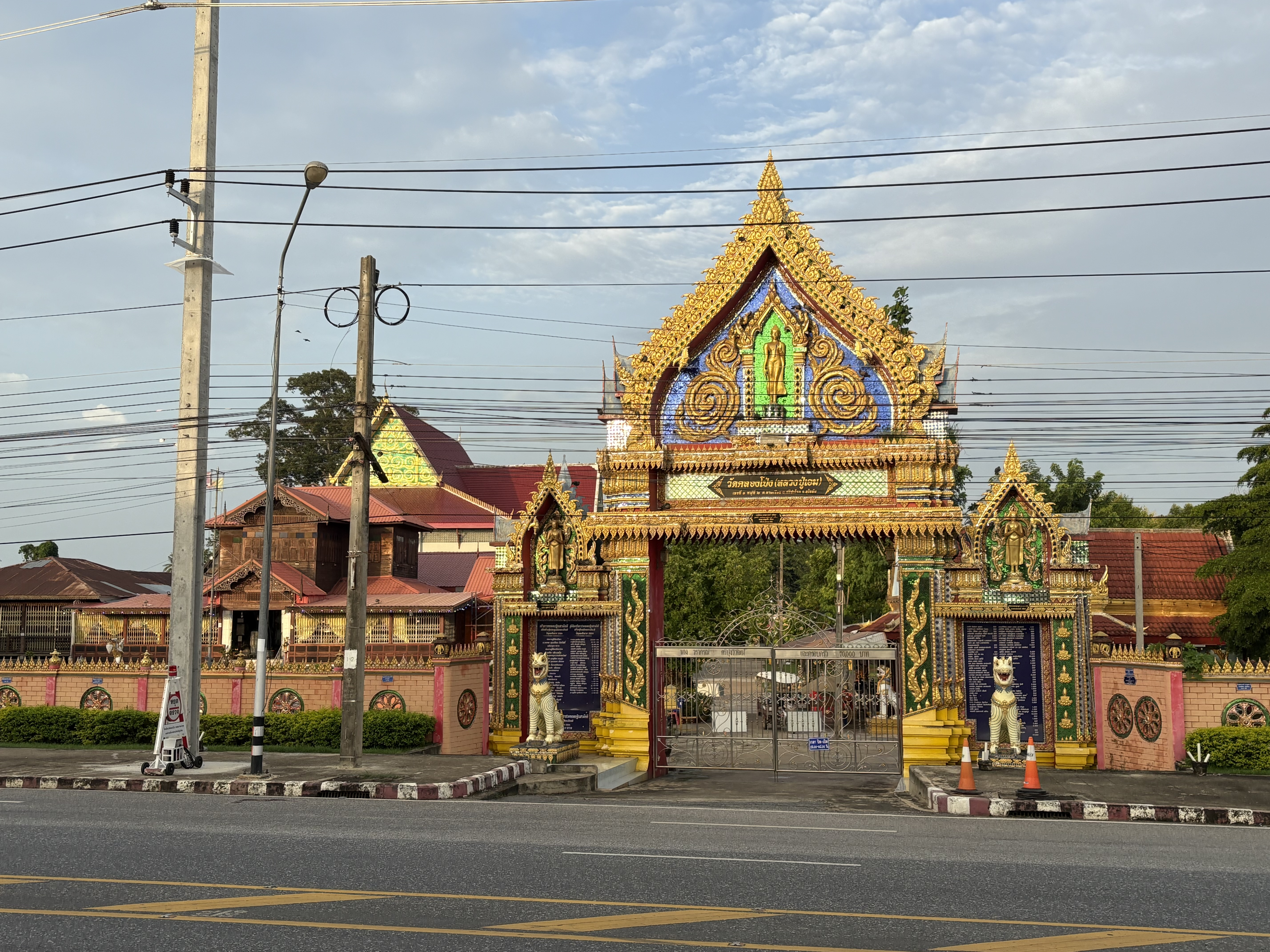
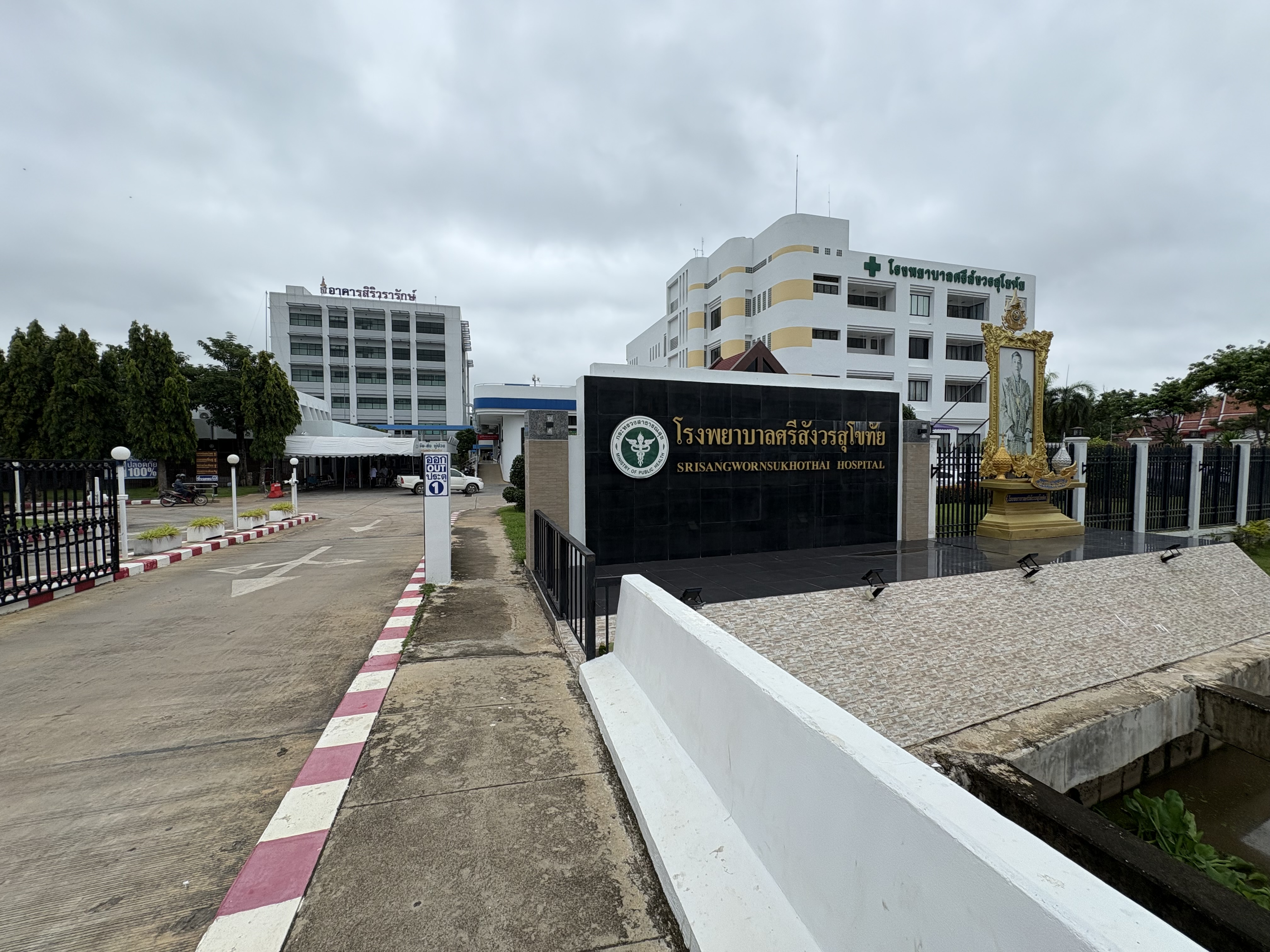
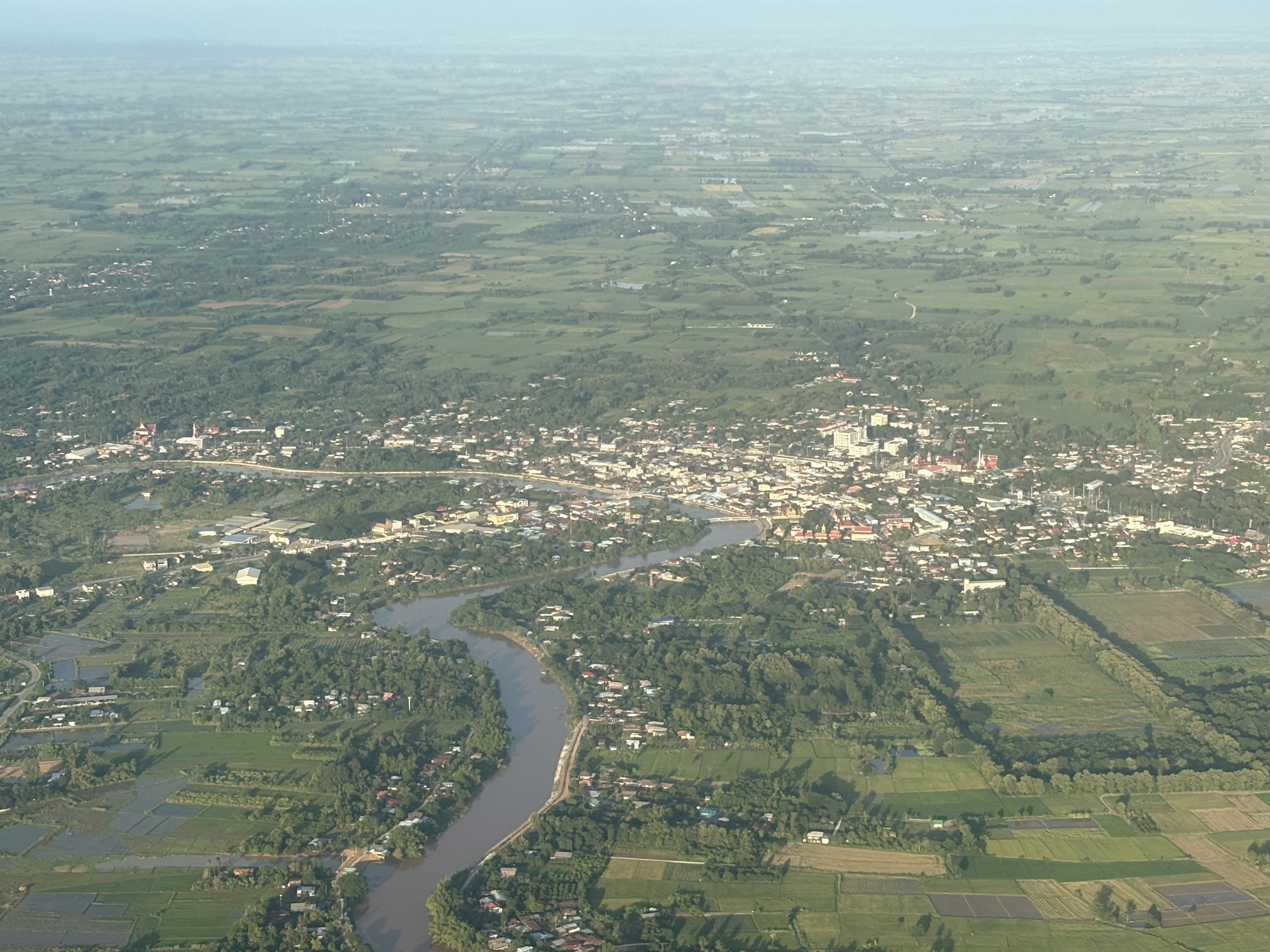
- Wat Sopharam Wat Khlong Pong Srisangworn Sukhothai Hospital Aerial view around Khlong Tan

- District location in Sukhothai province
- Coordinates: 17°9′53″N 99°51′43″E
- Country: Thailand
- Province: Sukhothai
- Seat: Khlong Tan

Area
  - Total: 565.7 km^{2} (218.4 sq mi)

Population (2005)
  - Total: 73,810
  - Density: 130.5/km^{2} (338/sq mi)
- Time zone: UTC+7 (ICT)
- Postal code: 64120
- Geocode: 6406

Si Samrong (Thai: ศรีสำโรง, pronounced [sǐː sǎm.rōːŋ]) is a district (amphoe) of Sukhothai Province in the lower north of Thailand.

== Geography ==
Neighboring districts are (clockwise from the south) Mueang Sukhothai, Ban Dan Lan Hoi, Thung Saliam, and Sawankhalok of Sukhothai Province and Phrom Phiram of Phitsanulok province.

Its important water resource is the Yom River.

== History ==
The district was renamed from Khlong Tan to Si Samrong in 1939.

== Administration ==
The district is divided into 13 sub-districts (tambons), which are further subdivided into 137 villages (mubans). The township (thesaban tambon) Si Samrong covers tambon Wang Luek and parts of tambons Khlong Tan and Sam Ruean. There are a further 12 tambon administrative organizations (TAO).

No.	Name	Thai name	Villages	Pop.
1.	Khlong Tan	คลองตาล	8	7,638
2.	Wang Luek	วังลึก	8	4,906
2.	Wang Luek	วังลึก	8	764
3.	Sam Ruean	สามเรือน	11	7,412
4.	Ban Na	บ้านนา	10	2,640
5.	Wang Thong	วังทอง	8	4,263
6.	Na Khun Krai	นาขุนไกร	12	6,749
7.	Ko Ta Liang	เกาะตาเลี้ยง	14	7,369
8.	Wat Ko	วัดเกาะ	11	5,031
9.	Ban Rai	บ้านไร่	10	5,532
10.	Thap Phueng	ทับผึ้ง	11	9,257
11.	Ban San	บ้านซ่าน	10	4,149
12.	Wang Yai	วังใหญ่	8	3,771
13.	Rao Ton Chan	ราวต้นจันทร์	8	4,329
