= Si Satchanalai district =

Si Satchanalai ศรีสัชนาลัย
- District
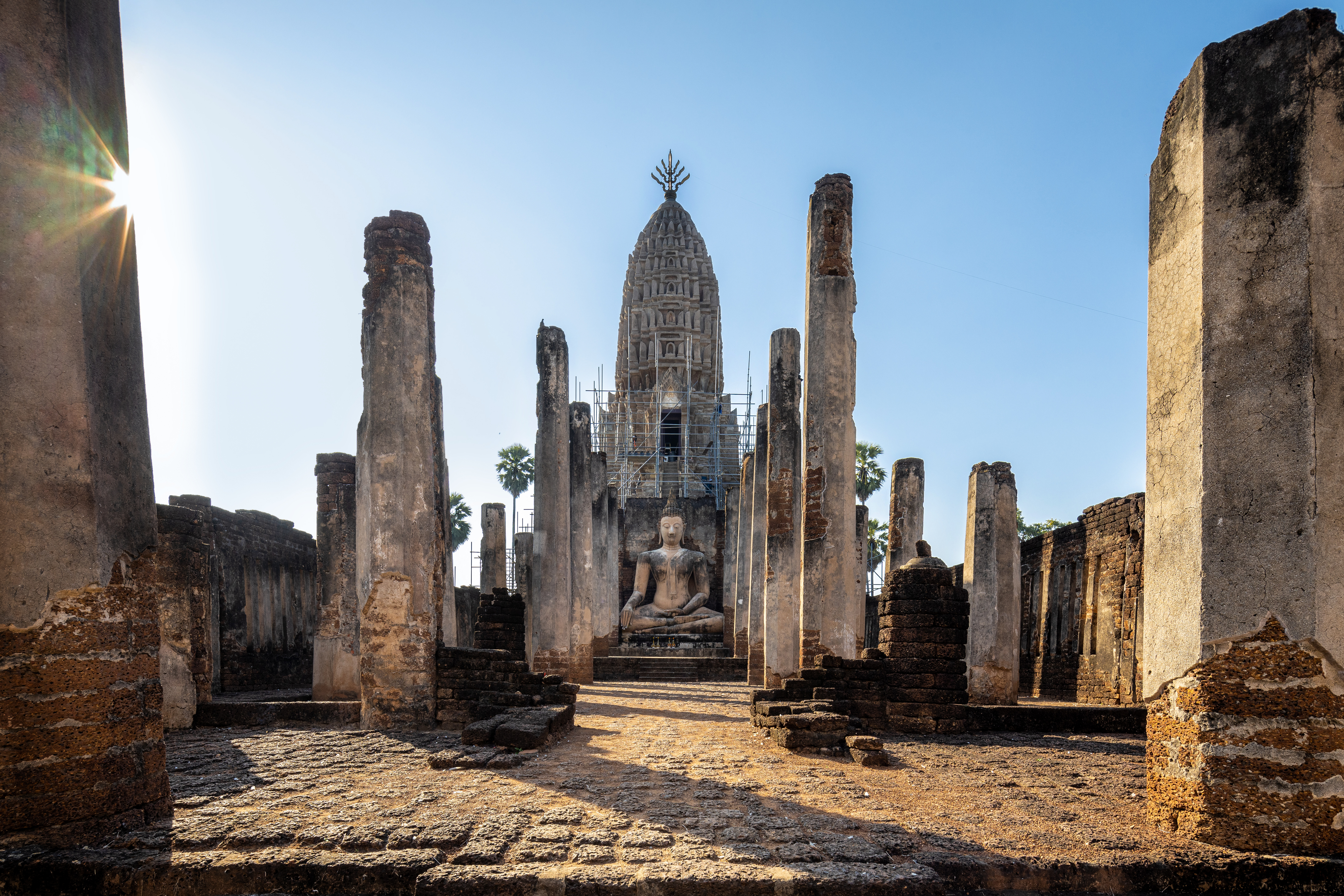
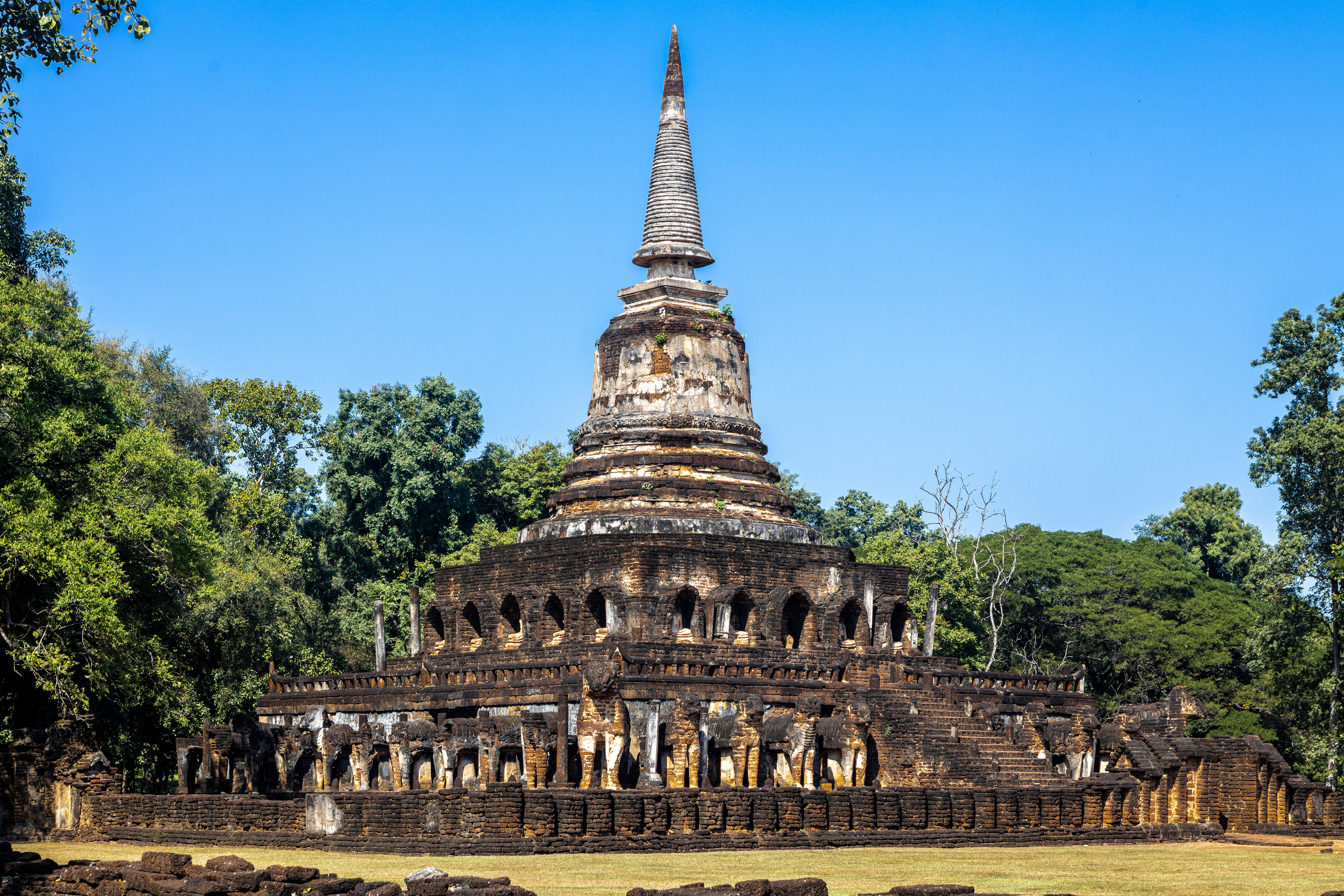
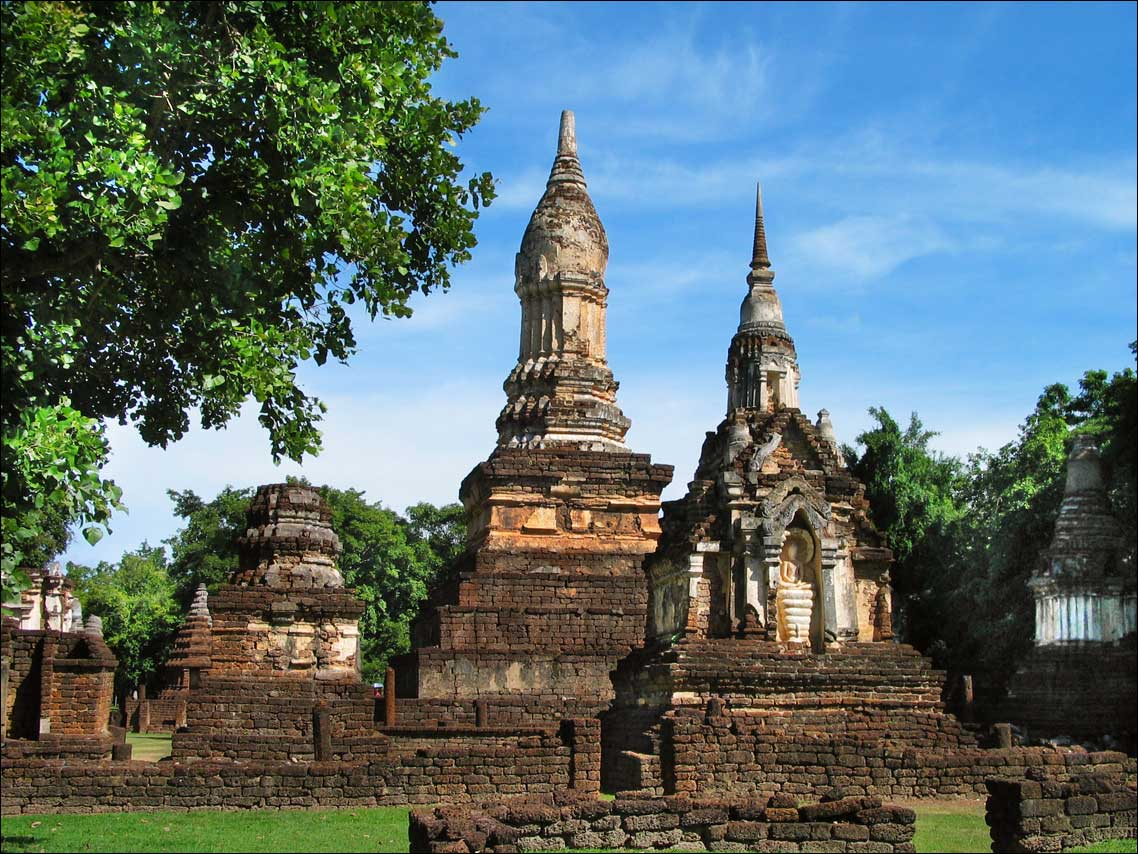
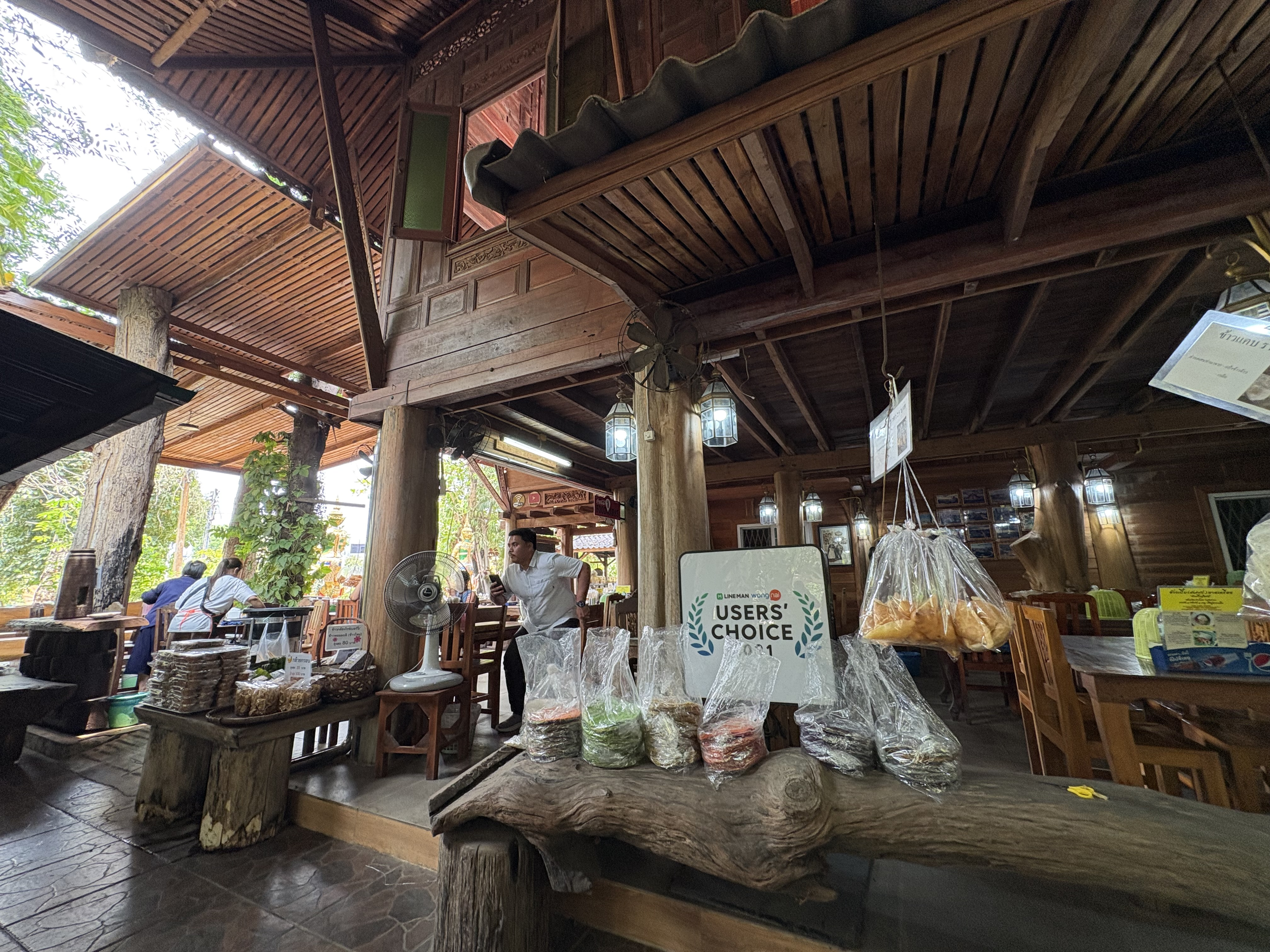
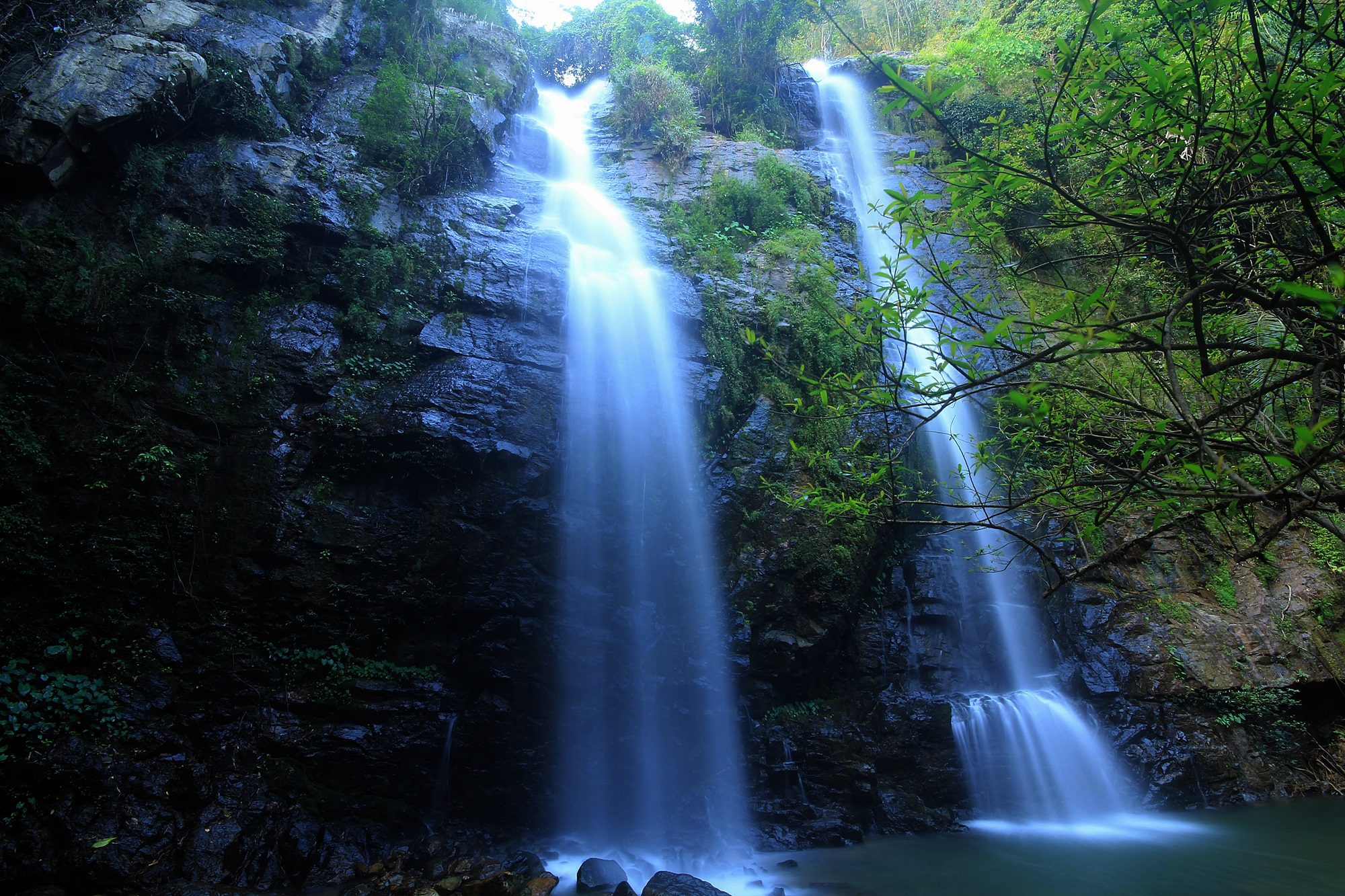
- Wat Phra Si Rattana Mahathat Wat Chang Lom Wat Chedi Chet Thaeo Khao Poep Yai Krueang Tat Dao Falls, Si Satchanalai National Park

- District location in Sukhothai province
- Coordinates: 17°31′2″N 99°45′37″E
- Country: Thailand
- Province: Sukhothai
- Seat: Hat Siao

Area
  - Total: 2,050.511 km^{2} (791.707 sq mi)

Population (2005)
  - Total: 95,198
  - Density: 46.4/km^{2} (120/sq mi)
- Time zone: UTC+7 (ICT)
- Postal code: 64130
- Geocode: 6405

Si Satchanalai (Thai: ศรีสัชนาลัย, pronounced [sǐː sàt.tɕʰā.nāː.lāj]) is the northernmost district (amphoe) of Sukhothai province, in the lower northern region of Thailand. Si may also be transliterated as Sri. The district contains the old town of the same name, the second city of the Sukhothai Kingdom, whose ruins form part of a World Heritage Site.

== Geography ==
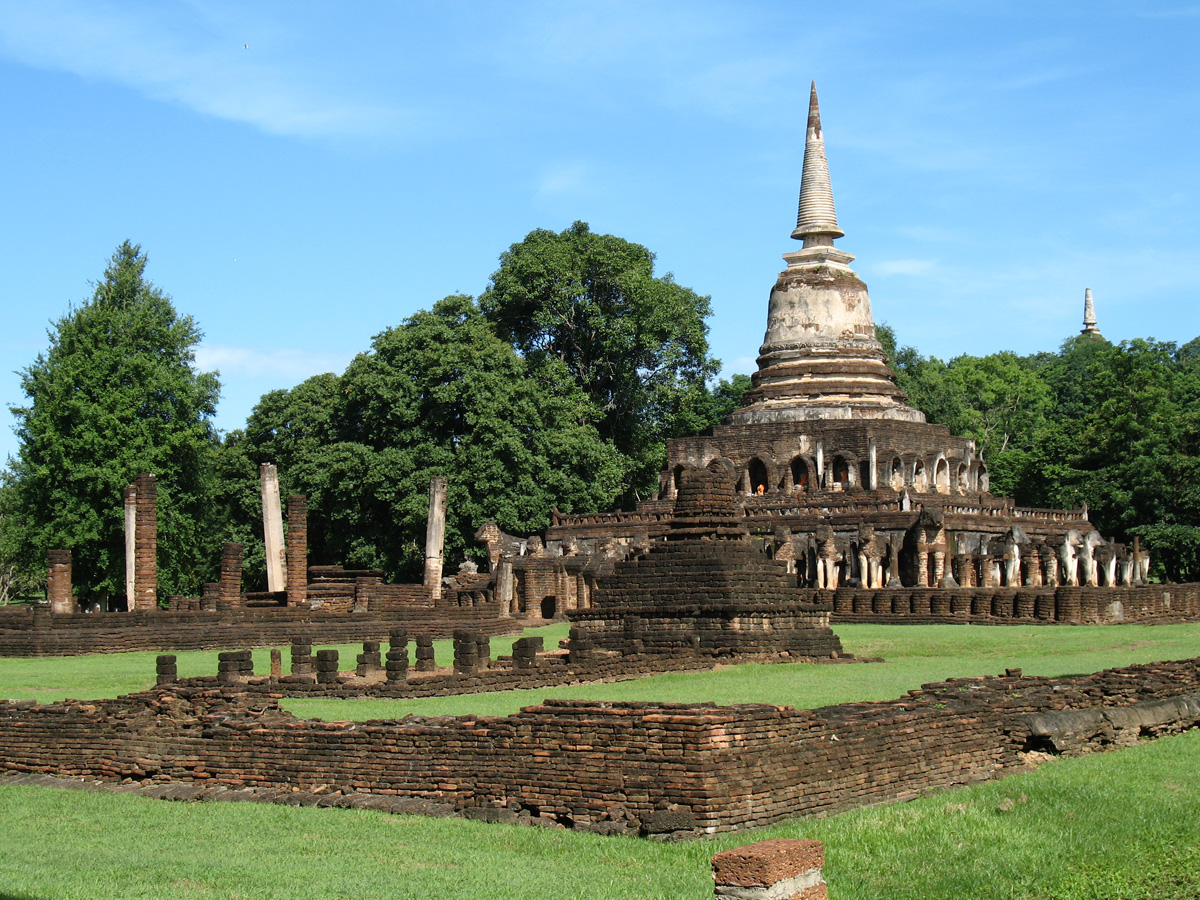
Wat Chang Lom in Si Satchanalai Historical Park

Neighboring districts are (from the southwest clockwise): Si Nakhon, Sawankhalok, Thung Saliam of Sukhothai Province, Thoen of Lampang province, Wang Chin of Phrae province, Laplae and Tron of Uttaradit province.

The Phi Pan Nam Mountains dominate the landscape of the district.

== History ==
Si Satchanalai was the second-most important town of the Sukhothai Kingdom. David K. Wyatt reads Si Satchanalai and Sukhothai as a paired-city polity rather than as a capital and a dependency, and takes the pairing as the model for other twin names of the period. On Chusak Satienpattanodom's reading the two centres of the district are successive rather than simultaneous. The older is Chaliang, whose remains run from about the 13th century upward, while the walled city 1.5 km upstream has none earlier than that. He takes the walled city for a late 13th-century foundation at Kaeng Luang, and offers three causes for the move: the Yom cutting its bank, a growing population, and a better defensive position. Its wall is of laterite on an earth bank, with two further ditch-and-bank lines outside it, enclosing about 500 rai and the hills Khao Phanom Phloeng and Khao Suwannakhiri. Some 200 monasteries stand in and around the two centres. The ruins of the old town's temples are now part of the Si Satchanalai Historical Park, which belongs to the UNESCO World Heritage Site of Sukhothai.

Wyatt, reporting Roxanna Brown, places the earliest unglazed wares from the Si Satchanalai kilns as early as the mid-12th century. He notes that the oldest kilns are dug into the high banks of the Yom, where fuel could be brought by boat. He holds that the industry was not yet a trade of international proportions in the first half of the 13th century. On his reckoning it grew from local to regional scale between about 1150 and 1250, reaching by the 14th century a size at which more than 100 kilns were firing at any one time. The kiln field runs along both banks of the Yom at Ban Ko Noi and Ban Pa Yang, and Chusak counts not fewer than 200 kiln remains across some five to six square kilometres. The oldest are tunnel kilns cut into the ground; Ban Pa Yang, 4 km away, has only brick kilns above ground and is the later expansion. He dates the earliest stoneware from the field to the 10th or 11th century.

In the account of the Wat Si Chum inscription, Pha Mueang withdrew with his men to Si Satchanalai after the taking of Sukhothai. He would not let Bang Klang Hao enter the captured town until his own troops had gone. Mueang Bang Yang, from which Bang Klang Hao came, has been placed between Mueang Rat and Si Satchanalai, though Wyatt quotes its proposers calling their placements no more than guesses.

A Lan Na force under Muen Dong Nakhon took the town about 1459 or 1460. In 1465 the ordained Borommatrailokkanat asked Lan Na for Si Satchanalai as alms and was refused. Ayutthaya retook it in 1474, and peace between the two kingdoms followed.

The district was renamed from Hat Siao to Si Satchanalai in 1939.

== Administration ==
The district is divided into 11 sub-districts (tambons), which are further subdivided into 148 villages (mubans). There are two townships (thesaban tambon). Hat Siao covers parts of tambon Hat Siao, and Si Satchanalai covers tambons Si Satchanalai, Tha Chai, and parts of Nong O. There are a further eight tambon administrative organizations (TAO).

No.	Name	Thai name	Villages	Pop.
1.	Hat Siao	หาดเสี้ยว	6	7,299
2.	Pa Ngio	ป่างิ้ว	12	7,267
3.	Mae Sam	แม่สำ	22	7,698
4.	Mae Sin	แม่สิน	25	12,774
5.	Ban Tuek	บ้านตึก	14	10,460
6.	Nong O	หนองอ้อ	11	6,859
7.	Tha Chai	ท่าชัย	10	10,892
8.	Si Satchanalai	ศรีสัชนาลัย	12	5,800
9.	Dong Khu	ดงคู่	9	5,926
10.	Ban Kaeng	บ้านแก่ง	13	9,939
11.	San Chit	สารจิตร	14	10,284
