= Pujiayuemo =

7th century Qian monarch

Pujiayuemo 蒲伽越摩
- King of Qian

King of Kamalanka
- Reign: by 656 – c. 665 (Note: The Cefu Yuangui records under the fifth month of 665 that the envoy of Gē Luó Shě Fēn began his journey in 656 and arrived in China in 665. The figures therefore describe the duration of the embassy, and neither the beginning nor the end of the king's reign is known.)
- Predecessor: Pu xie qi yao
- Successor: Anuruddha

King of Qiān Zhī Fú
- Reign: c. 665
- Predecessor: Ramaraja?
- Successor: Rajadhiraj

Pujiayuemo (Chinese: 蒲伽越摩) is recorded in the Chinese leishu Cefu Yuangui and in the New Book of Tang as a ruler of the polity known as Gē Luó Shě Fēn (哥罗舍分). He is named in the entry for the fifth month of 665, which records the arrival of a group of missions from the South Seas; the same entry states that the envoy sent in his name had set out in 656 and reached China only nine years later, so that the two dates mark the span of one journey rather than the length of a reign. Tatsuo Hoshino identifies that polity as an expanded Qiān Zhī Fú and its ruling house as Siamese.

== Name ==
Gē Luó Shě Fēn is generally taken to be a corrupted transcription of Jiā Luó Shě Fú (迦逻舍佛), interpreted as Canasapura, a polity centred at Si Thep with Mueang Sema as an important eastern centre. The king's own name is known only in its Chinese transcription, and the transcription is not stable across the sources: alongside 蒲伽越摩 the form 满越伽摩 (Man Yue Jia Mo) is recorded, in which the first character differs and the order of the following two is reversed. No corresponding form has been established in the local vernaculars. The Nakhon Pathom seat over which he is held to have extended his authority appears in the epigraphic record under yet another name, Sambuka, identified by several scholars with Nakhon Pathom, whose king is mentioned without being named in the Lopburi inscription K.577 of about the 8th–9th century.

== Reign and territory ==
His reign is understood as a period of territorial expansion taking in Si Thep, associated with Qiān Zhī Fú, and the western Menam valleys, a region previously under Dvaravati control. The Cefu Yuangui places Gē Luó Shě Fēn in the southern part of the South Seas and connected on its eastern side with Duoheluo, that is Dvaravati, which puts it to the west of that polity, and the expansion appears to have confined Dvaravati political power to the eastern Chao Phraya basin, where authority was concentrated at Lavapura of Lavo. The polity is credited with a force of some 20,000 elite soldiers.

== Relations with neighbouring polities ==
Gē Luó Shě Fēn is described as maintaining close relations with Xiū Luó Fēn, credited with 20,000 to 30,000 troops, (Note: The Cefu Yuangui records that Xiū Luó Fēn possessed 30,000 elite troops, whereas the New Book of Tang reports a lower figure of 20,000 soldiers. Cefu Yuangui: 修罗分国，居于南海之北，以木栅为城，东至真腊国，南至海。其王名尸达摩提婆，精兵三万余人。 New Book of Tang: ...二國勝兵二萬，甘畢才五千。 The English rendering of the Cefu Yuangui entry published by Lin Ying and Huang Jiaxin gives 20,000 for Xiū Luó Fēn, agreeing with the New Book of Tang against the Chinese text quoted here.) and with Gān Bì, whose strength is given as only 5,000, which suggests wider networks of alliance or tributary interaction in the region. In 665 the three are recorded as having sent embassies together to the Chinese court under the Tang, arriving in the fifth month of that year alongside missions from Yufo, Mola and Sanpu.
