= Kamalanka =

1st–13th century political entities

Kamalanka Chia-Mo-Lang-Chia (กามลังกา/หลางหยาซิว)
- 216 BCE – 1204
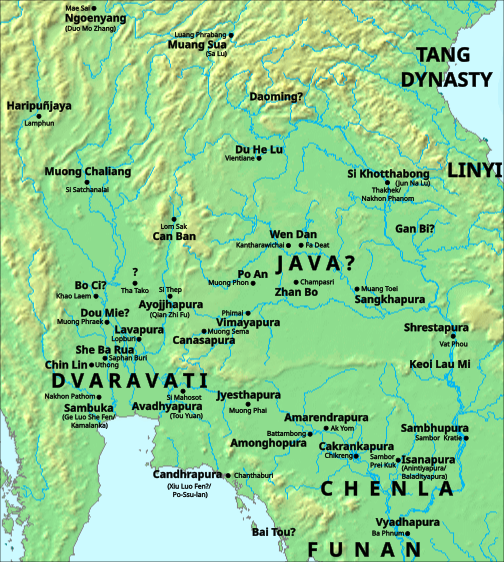
- Proposed locations of ancient kingdoms in Menam and Mekong Valleys in the 7th century based on the details provided in the Chinese leishu, Cefu Yuangui, and others.

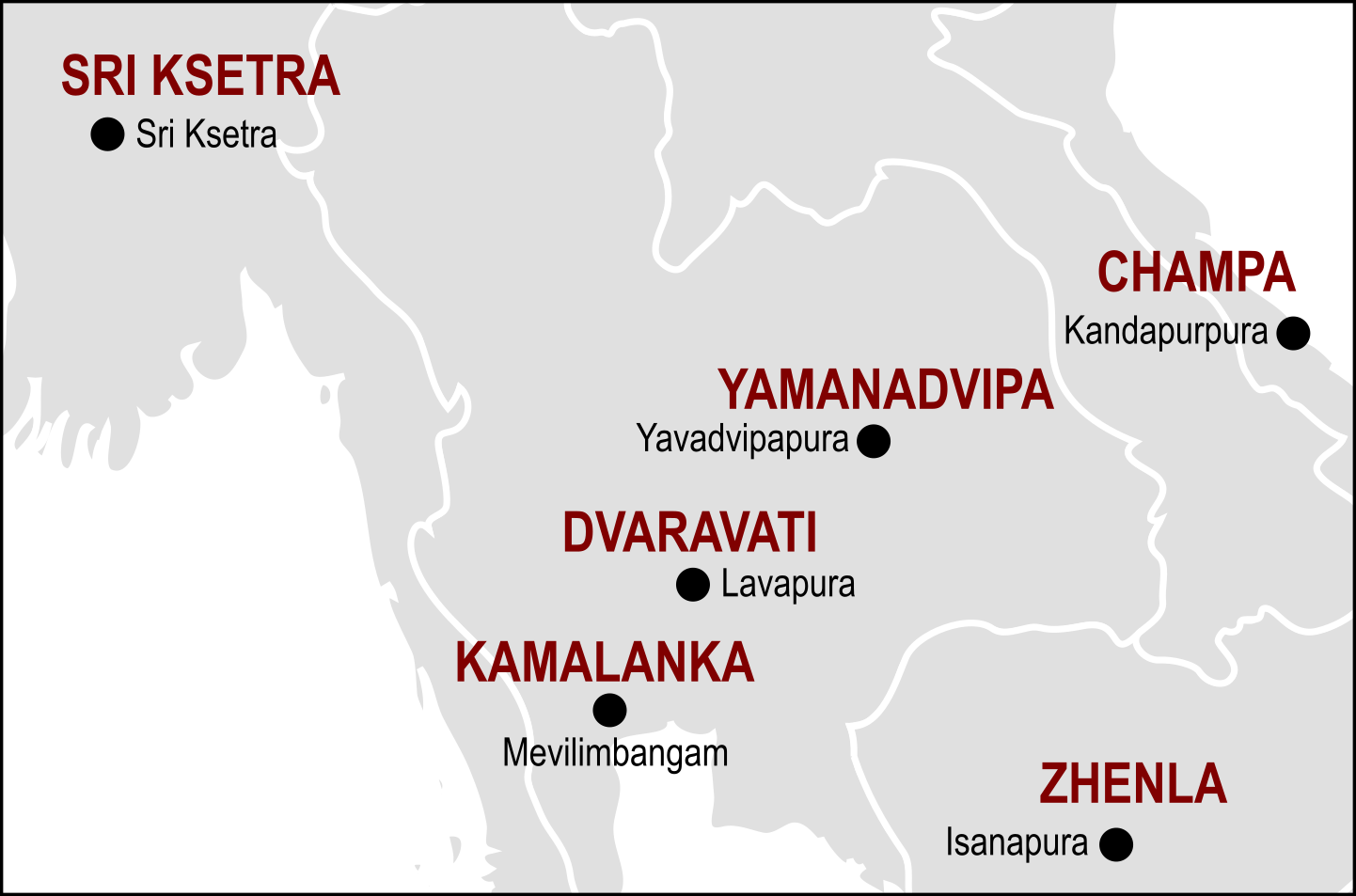
- Six ancient kingdoms in Mainland Southeast Asia mentioned by Xuanzang in the 7th century
- Capital: Mevilimbangam or Sambuka (590–12th-c.); Sambukapattana (12th–13th-c.)
- Religion: Buddhism
- Government: Mandala kingdom
  - 569–641: Kakabhadra
  - 641–648: Kalavarnadisharaja
  - 648–649?: Shridravya
  - c. 656–665: Pú jiā yuè mó
- Historical era: Post-classical era
  - Established: 216 BCE
  - Gē Luó embassy to China: Before 57 CE
  - Chia-mo-lang-chia embassy to China: 515 CE
  - Formation of Dvaravati: 6th–7th century
  - Decline of Mueang Uthong: 8th century
  - Tambralinga conquered Menam Valley: 927
  - Raided by Chola: 1030
  - Destroyed by Pagan: 1058
  - Merged into Phrip Phri: 1204
Preceded by
Chin Lin
Tun Sun
She Ba Ruo
Funan
Succeeded by
Dvaravati
Chen Li Fu
Phrip Phri
- Today part of: Thailand; Myanmar

Kamalanka, variously recorded in Chinese sources as Chia-mo-lang-chia, elsewhere as Kolo (Gē Luó), in Ptolemy's Geographike Hyphegesis as Balangka or Kalonga, in the Tanjore Inscription as Mevilimbangam, and in the Bhavavarman II inscription as Sambuka, was a multicultural polity in the Northern Kra Isthmus during the Dvaravati period. Established in the late 1st or early 2nd century CE, it endured until 1058, when its capital at ancient Nakhon Pathom was likely destroyed by Anawrahta of Pagan during his invasion of the Lavo Kingdom. Regarded as the successor of Tun Sun, its first embassy to China in 515 CE claimed a foundation some four centuries earlier, and subsequent embassies were dispatched in 523 and 531. The polity remained known in later tradition, with 20th-century Chinese settlers still referring to the western Chao Phraya region, specifically the Meklong-Tha Chin Basins, as Lang-jia-jiu, while the Lan Na Yonok Chronicle recorded Ayodhya of the pre-Ayutthaya era as Guru Rath (กุรุรัฐ; lit. 'Country of Guru' गुरु), closely resembling the Chinese name Kolo.

Briggs held that the neighbouring Pan Pan took in Takola and the Takola-Bandon route and reached the northern end of the Kra Isthmus, where it bordered Tun Sun. Kamalanka's northern territories merged into the Dvaravati sphere alongside neighboring polities after the collapse of Funan. Though once identified with Langkasuka, Chinese geographic descriptions place Kamalanka in the lower central plains of Thailand. Piriya Krairiksh has argued that early Indianized Nakhon Pathom first served as Pan Pan's port at Mueang Uthong before the Mon shifted power to Nakhon Pathom, which was later recorded as Ge Luo She Fen in the Cefu Yuangui (1005) and as the Ge Luo Kingdom in the New Book of Tang (1044).

Kamalanka declined in the 12th and 13th centuries, with its center likely relocated to Sambukapattana in present-day Ban Pong district, Ratchaburi province. Concurrently, breakaway polities emerged, including Chen Li Fu in Suphanburi and Phrip Phri in Phetchaburi. Chen Li Fu developed into Suphannabhum, while Phrip Phri expanded northward in around the late 12th century, subsuming both Chen Li Fu and Kamalanka. All three were later consolidated into the Ayutthaya Kingdom in the 14th century. Certain Thai traditions ascribe a far earlier origin, claiming that nobles of the Anuradhapura Kingdom of Lanka established Kamalanka in 216 BCE, with a related group founding Langkasuka in 217 BCE in present-day Pattani as its sister polity.

== Records ==
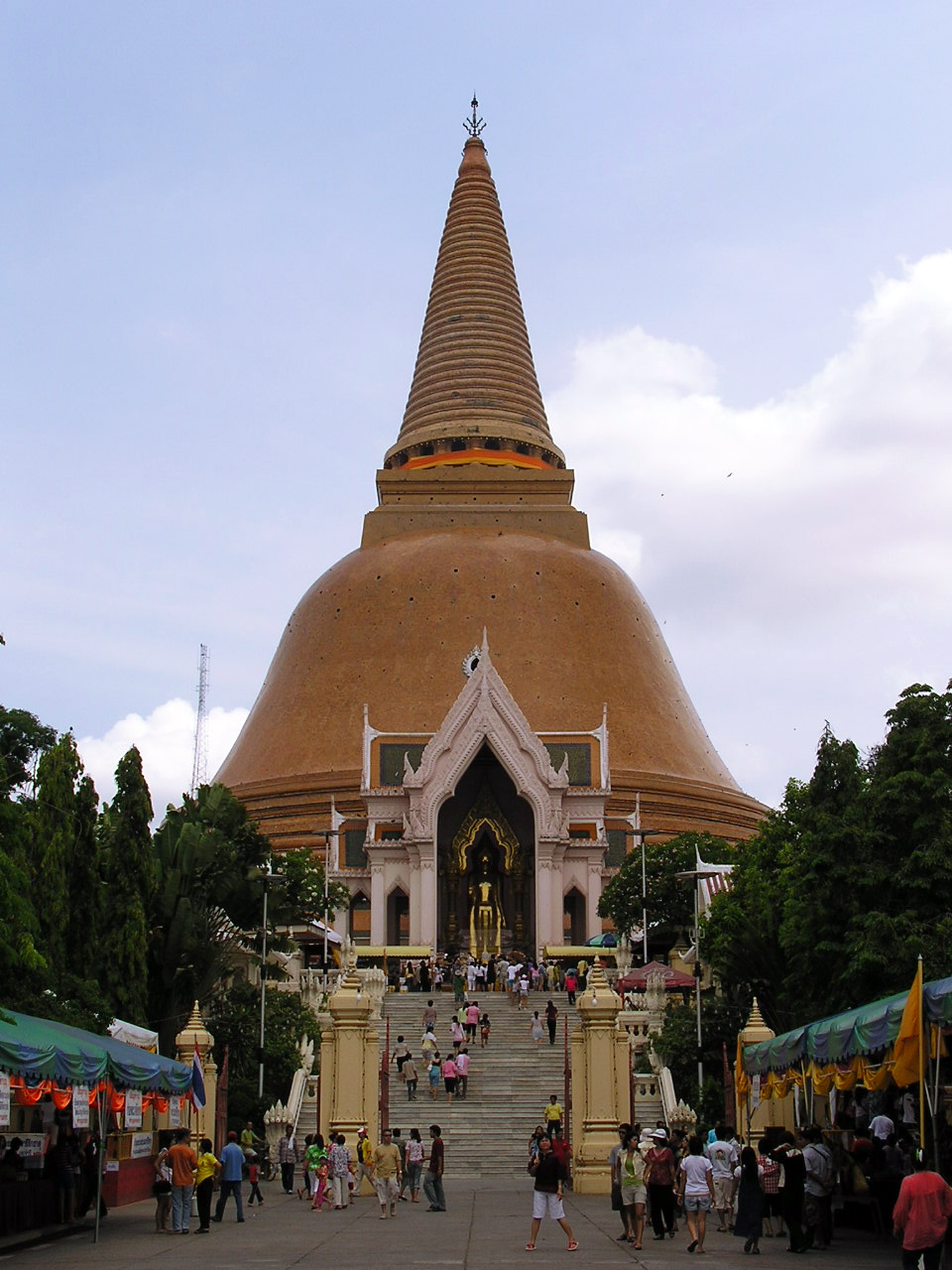
Pathom stupa in Nakhon Pathom, the oldest stupa in Thailand, built around the year 193 BCE.

Inscriptions found at Pathom stupa in the ancient Nakhon Pathom, stating the Ye Dhammā formula, written with the Grantha script.

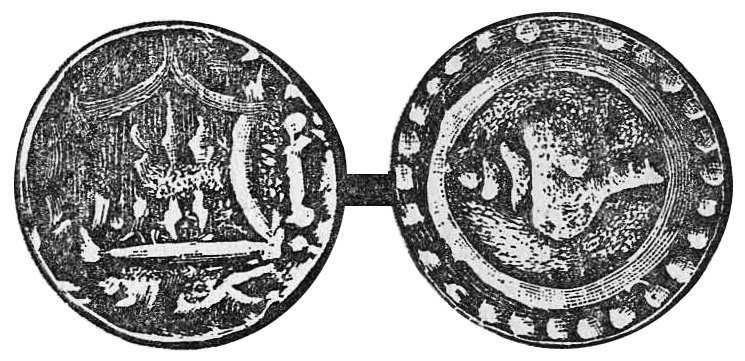
Ancient coins found at Mueang Uthong.

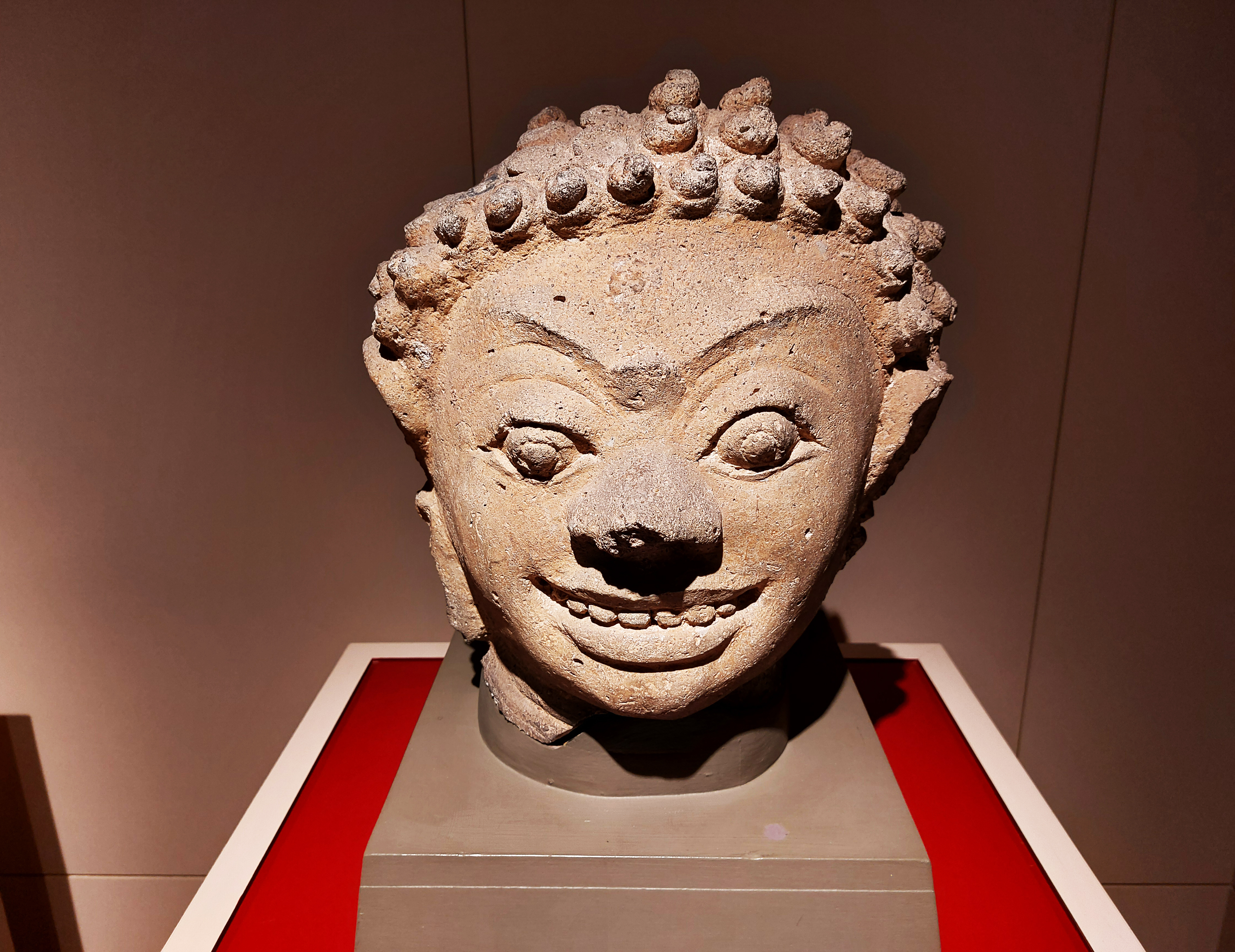
Head of a yakṣa, dated 8th–10th centuries CE, discovered during excavation at Phra Men Temple, Nakhon Pathom province, displayed at the Bangkok National Museum.

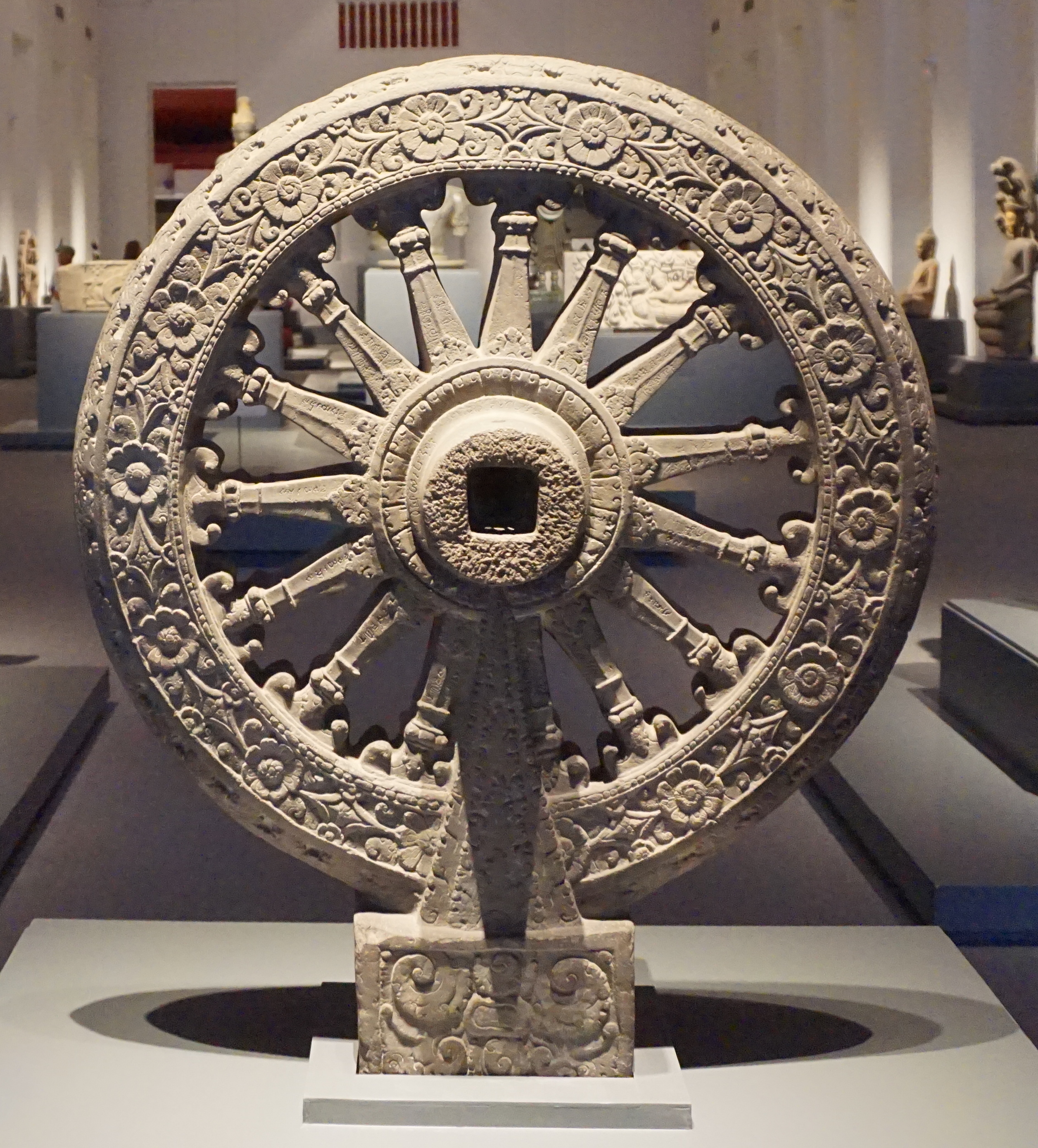
Dharmachakra, dated 7th century CE, Dvaravati art, found at the Mueang Uthong

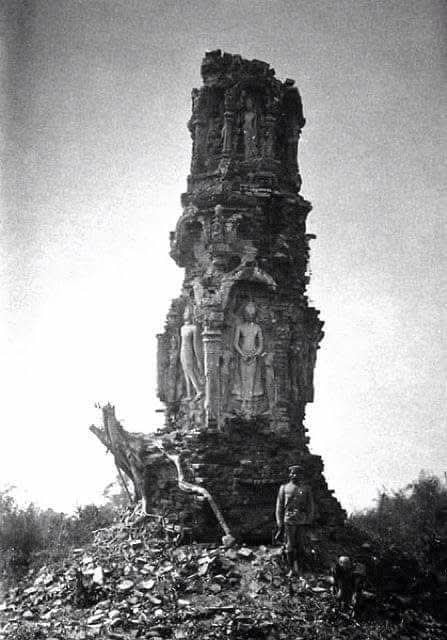
The 1900s image of the Dvaravati-style Chedi in the present Wat Phra Rub temple. It later collapsed, and the area was then transformed into a parking area.

Based on references in the book of I Ching and the seventh-century travel records of the Chinese monk Xuanzang, Kamalanka has been equated with Lang-ya-xiu or Lang-chia-shu. The Liáng Shū records that this polity measured thirty days’ journey from east to west and twenty days from north to south, situated 24,000 li from Guangzhou. The settlement of Balangka or Kalonga, mentioned in Ptolemy's Geographike Hyphegesis in the 2nd century CE, may also correspond to Kamalanka, being described therein as a “metropolis.”

Epigraphic evidence from Nakhon Pathom reinforces this association. A terracotta seal inscribed in Prakrit with Brahmi script, deciphered by Jiraphat Prapanwittaya and Varindra Vasishtha, refers to varapata(na), meaning “the glorious port city.” Saritpong Khumsong has proposed that during the Angkorian period (12th–13th centuries), Nakhon Pathom was possibly designated Sambuka or Sambukapattana, as attested in the Preah Khan inscription. Following hydrological changes, the principal settlement is believed to have shifted westward to Mueang Sa Kosi Narai (เมืองสระโกสินารายณ์) on the east bank of the Mae Klong River, while retaining its earlier appellation.

The designation Sambukapattana translates as “the port city of Sambuka.” One interpretation of Sambuka identifies it with the asura—a class of divine antagonists in Hindu mythology—while other meanings include a devotee named Shambuka or a generic reference to a conch or bivalve shell.

=== Lanka records ===
The Tanjore Inscription, dating back to 1030, contains a list of the ports on the Kra Isthmus to the Malacca Strait that were raided by a fleet sent by King Rajendra Chola I. The following are the ports located on the Kra Isthmus; some cannot yet be precisely identified.

- Mevilimbangam – Kamalanka, has beautiful walls as defense.
- Mayirudingan – the Je-lo-ting of the Chinese, surrounded by the deep sea as by a moat, the exact location remains disputed. Some placed it at the Sathing Phra Peninsular in Songkhla, where the Chinese called Rìluótíng in the 13th–14th century. Some says Chaiya.
- Talaittakkolam – Takkola (Trang or Takua Pa) of Ptolemy and the Milinda Panha, praised by great men versed in the sciences.
- Madamalingam –Tambralinga, capable of strong action in dangerous battles.

Suchandra Ghosh, an Indian archeologist, and Samuel Beal, a British oriental scholar, placed Kamalanka, which identified as Mevilimbangam, in the Irrawaddy delta, to be specific, Pegu, while George Cœdès identified Pegu with Mäppappälam, the city raided by Rajendra Chola I in 1030 as mentions in the Tanjore Inscription.

=== As Ge Luo She Fen and Gē Luó ===
Thai scholar Piriya Krairiksh equates the kingdom of Ge Luo She Fen, recorded in the Cefu Yuangui, with the Gē Luó country (哥罗国) of the New Book of Tang, placing both in the same region as Kamalanka. The Tongdian of 801 refers to this polity as Gē Luó Fù Shā Luó (哥罗富沙罗/哥羅富沙羅), known to the Chinese since the Han dynasty, comprising 24 subordinate states without provincial divisions. Its military organization was notable for the use of elephants in battle, each bearing up to one hundred soldiers. Tribute was first recorded during the reign of Emperor Guangwu of Han (25–57 CE). Some scholars instead state Ge Luo She Fen is the corrupted term of Jiā Luó Shě Fú (迦逻舍佛; Canasapura) in Si Thep and the Phimai region, with the suffix fēn reflecting a variant of the Sanskrit pūra, denoting a town or city.

The Tongdian describes Gē Luó as a fortified city whose ruler bore the surname Shǐ Lì Pó Luó (矢利婆罗) and given name Mǐ Shī Bō Luó (米失钵罗). Its capital featured stone walls, towers, and guarded gates, while the palace was roofed with grass. The society was distinguished by unique marriage customs, musical traditions, and funerary rites, including cremation with ashes placed in golden vessels submerged at sea. Geographically, the Tongdian locates Gē Luó southeast of Pan Pan. Earlier scholars identified it with Kalah on the southwestern Malay Peninsula, while later theories placed it on the Kra Isthmus or at ancient Nakhon Pathom. Others associate it with Bandon Bay, specifically Chaiya, which by that period was integrated into Srivijaya and later Tambralinga.

The Cefu Yuangui further notes that Gē Luó Shě Fēn bordered Duò Hé Luó (堕和罗国; Dvaravati or Lavo) to the east and maintained an army of 20,000 elite soldiers. Its king is named Pú jiā yuè mó (蒲伽越摩). Along with Xiū Luó Fēn and Gān Bì, it sent tribute missions to the Tang court. These three polities shared similar institutions, though Xiū Luó Fēn possessed the largest military force, exceeding 30,000, while Gān Bì maintained only 5,000. The same passage names the king of Gān Bì as Candravarman (旃陀越摩) and places that polity in the southern sea with Huanwang (環王) close to its east. A later Ming source, the Guangdong Tongzhi, identifies the Malacca Sultanate as Gē Luó Fù Shā, also tracing its origins to the Han dynasty but noting its subsequent vassalization to Tun Sun.

Three similar names appear in these records, and the sources place them at different points. Jiā Luó Shě Fú (迦羅舍佛, read as Canasapura) is given in the Jiu Tang Shu as lying to the north of Duò Hé Luó, whose other bounds are Pan Pan to the south, Zhenla to the east and the open sea to the west. Gē Luó Shě Fēn (哥羅舍分) is placed by the Cefu Yuangui in the southern part of the southern sea with Duò Hé Luó to its east, its territory adjoining it, under a king named Man Yue Jia Mo and with twenty thousand picked troops; the same passage places Xiū Luó Fēn in the northern part of that sea with Zhenla to its east. Gē Luó (哥羅), also written 个羅 and Gē Luó Fù Shā Luó (哥羅富沙羅), is placed by the Tongdian to the south-east of Pan Pan, under a king named Xi Mi Mi Luo Po Luo (悉密迷囉波羅) of the Shi Li Po Luo line (矢利波羅), with stone walls and twenty-four districts. The two names appear in variant form as Mi Shi Bo Luo (米失鉢羅) and Shi Li Po Luo (矢利婆羅), the characters of the first being transposed between the accounts.

Tatsuo Hoshino treated the first two as one polity and read the discrepancy as a territorial change over time rather than an error. Between the dates of the two reports, on his account, Dvaravati expanded north-eastward and gained the areas of modern Nakhon Ratchasima and Chaiyaphum, after which Canasapura relinquished the Nakhon Ratchasima area and its territory receded to what he calls its original core in the northern half of the Chao Phraya plain and the Sak valley, which would account for the same state appearing first north of Dvaravati and afterwards beside it. On that reading Mueang Sema in Nakhon Ratchasima province was Canasapura's eastern centre. The third name is a separate case: Gē Luó is written with different characters and is placed far to the south, and is not necessarily the same polity.

In summary, two competing interpretations exist regarding the kingdom's location. One places it in the southern Malay Peninsula, linked with Gē Luó Fù Shā Luó (哥罗富沙罗/哥羅富沙羅) and later traditions of Malacca; the other situates Gē Luó Shě Fēn (哥罗舍分国) in the northern peninsula, bordering Dvaravati, with possible centers at Nakhon Pathom, Mueang Uthong, and Si Thep.

=== Journey of Chang Chun ===
In the journey of Chang Chun as a Chinese envoy to Chi Tu in 607, Kamalanka was referred to as Lang-ya-xiu. It was said to be on the north of Chi Tu, another indianized state in the Singora Inland Sea (present Songkhla province).

...Then going southward (from Champa) they reached Shih-tzu-shih (Lion Rock in Chanthaburi province), whence there extend a chain of large and small islands. After two or three days' voyage, they saw in the west the mountains of Lang-ya-hsu (Khao Sam Roi Yot). Then, continuing southwards to Chi-lung (Fowl Cage Island in Chumphon province), they reached the borders of Chi Tu....

According to the location mentioned above, Thai scholar, Chand Chirayu Rajani, purposed Lang-ya-xiu was potentially located in the west Chao Phraya River basin, and strongly denied Paul Wheatley's assumption that equated Lang-ya-xiu with Langkasuka (Chinese: 凌牙斯加/龍牙犀角; Ling-ya-si-jia/Long-ya-xi-jiao), which was located in modern-day deep south Thailand, and Wheatley's assumption has been continued by many scholars to the present day. Rajani additionally asserts that even Chinese people who settled in the west Chao Phraya River basin still called the area Lang-jia-jiu. There are also the islands named Lang-ya-jiew islands (birds' nest islands) in Chumphon province, which expected to be the southern border of Lang-ya-xiu.

=== Tang records ===
The Old Book of Tang, dating 618 onwards, also indicates the location of Lang-ya-xiu, situated north of Pan Pan, aligning with Rajani's hypothesis. The text was translated by Paul Wheatley as follows.

...The kingdom of P'an-P'an is situated to the southwest of Lin-i (Champa) on a bay of the sea. To the north, it is separated from Lin-i by the Small Sea. One can reach it by boat from Chiao-chou (Tonkin) in forty days, and it adjoins the kingdom of Lang-ya-hsiu...

As per the text provided, since Pan Pan was placed at the area along the Bandon Bay in Surat Thani province, Lang-ya-xiu should be on the plain in lower Central Thailand; however, Paul Wheatley positioned Lang-ya-xiu to the south of Pan Pan. The location of both Pan Pan and Lang-ya-xiu given in the New Book of Tang, also sustaintiated Rajani's hypothesis. The text was translated by Peter Bee of the School of Oriental and African Studies, University of London, as follows.

...P'an-P'an is on the bend of the Southern Sea (Gulf of Siam). To the north, it goes as far as the surrounding king's border (and) a small amount of sea connects it with Lang-Su-Shih. From the crossing of the mainland, it takes forty days of sea travel to arrive (at P'an-P'an). The king is called Yang-su-Shih....

=== I Ching and the Journey of Xuanzang ===
Attempts to identify Kamalanka with the Mon kingdom of Thaton, whose existence before the 13th century is questioned by Michael Aung-Thwin, remain disputed, particularly in light of Xuanzang's description of Kamalanka as hemmed in by mountains and rivers.

The book of I Ching or Yijing, dating to the late 7th century, also mentions to Kamalanka as Lang-ya-xiu, which conforms to the information provided in the 629–645 journey of a Chinese monk, Xuanzang, who referred to Kamalanka as Chia-mo-lang-chia. The location provided by both indicates that Lang-ya-xiu is equated with Chia-mo-lang-chia or Kamalanka. The two accounts are not independent of one another: Xuanzang never travelled in mainland Southeast Asia, and Yijing repeats his sequence of countries verbatim some fifty years later.

Book of I Ching giving the location of the kingdoms in mainland Southeast Asia from the west to east direction, as follows.

...Southwards from this, and bordering the sea-coast, is the kingdom Shi-li-ch'a-ta-lo (Srikshetra). Further to the southeast is the kingdom of Lang-chia-shu. Further east is the kingdom of She-ho-po-ti (Dvaravati). In the extreme east is the kingdom of Lin-i (Champa)...

Journey of Xuanzang also provided the location of the polities in the same area with I Ching. as follows.

...Thence north-eastwards is the kingdom of Shi-li-ch'a-ta-lo (Srikshetra), Next, to the south-east, in a recess of the ocean, is the kingdom of Chia-mo-lang-chia (Kamalanka). Next, to the east is the kingdom of To-lo-po-ti (Dvaravati). Next, to the east is the kingdom of I-shang-na-pu-lo (Isanapura). Next to the east is the kingdom of Mo-ho-chan-po (Mahacampa), which is the same as Lin-i, and to the west the country of Yen-nio-na-cheu (Yamanadvipa)...

From both texts, if Lang-ya-hsiu/Lang-chia-shu or Chia-mo-lang-chia (Kamalanka) is identified with Langkasuka as Paul Wheatley's presumption, Dvaravati, Isanapura, and Champa would be placed somewhere in the middle of the South China Sea, which is impracticable. Thus, the west Menam Valley is more feasible.

=== As Sambuka ===
Following the fall of the Srivijaya maritime trade network and the end of political turmoil in the Menam Valley in the 10th–11th centuries, Angkor rose and exerted influence in the region. Saritpong Khumsong, a Thai scholar, notes that the ancient Nakhon Pathom was referred to as "Sambuka" during this era. However, the shallow and unnavigable rivers have resulted in its depopulation. The populace relocated 27 kilometers west to settle on the bank of the Mae Klong in present-day Ban Pong district, and this new settlement, according to the Preah Khan inscription, was named after their origins as "Sambukapattana", which means "the port city of Sambuka" or "the land of Sambuka". Several scholars also place Sambuka at Nakhon Pathom. In the Preah Khan inscription the name stands in a string of six cities of which the other five are read as Lopburi, Suphan Buri, Ratchaburi, Sing Buri and Phetchaburi, and Śamvūkapaṭṭana is the only one that has not been located; Peter Skilling regards a connection between it and the Śāmbūka of the Lopburi inscription as probable but leaves the place unidentified. The Ban Pong placement has a chain behind it. Cœdès, noting the name Cāmbūka on a Dvaravati-style Buddha recovered at Lopburi, went no further than the Menam valley; Phōngsi Wanasin and Thiwa Supcanya located it at Ban Pong under code no. 10.2 of their survey, following M. C. Subhadradis Diskul, who in 1966 quoted Tri Amatyakul's proposal without endorsing it and printed a plan of the supposed site. During the Thonburi and early Rattanakosin periods, the city was referred to as "Kosi Narai" (โกสินารายณ์). Numerous artifacts with the Angkorian style have been discovered at the site, but are sparingly found in the ancient Nakhon Pathom.

In addition to the 13th century Preah Khan inscription (K.908), "Sambuka" is also mentioned in the inscription on the base of the standing Dvaravati Buddha statue found at Wat Phra Sri Ratana Mahathat in Lopburi (K.577), dated to around the 8th–9th century. The text was inscribed in Sanskrit with Pallava script and says Arushva, the chief of the people of Tangura (ตังคุระ) and the son of the king of Sambuka, created this Buddha image. The formula presupposes a reigning house at Sambuka in that period and a practice of placing its sons in authority over outlying communities, the image itself having been found at Lopburi rather than at the centre; none of the rulers listed below has been identified with the king the inscription leaves unnamed. (Note: Registered as LB 5. The image, of grey sandstone and 1.6 m high with its base, was recovered on 28 June 1924 by Luang Boribal Buribhand from a low mound at the north-eastern corner of the perimeter wall of the temple, and is now in the Somdet Phra Narai National Museum. The donor's name is also transliterated Ārjava, and is given the title nāyaka.) In the Bhavavarman II Inscription (K.1150), also known as the Inscription of Wat Kud Tae, found in Sa Kaeo province, dating 6th century, the text which is also in Sanskrit with Pallava script, described the relation between one of Dvaravati polities with Chenla to the east, says that during the Chenla's northwest expansion, the minister who was the deputy governor of Shrestapura engaged in the wars against "Sambuka". In contrast, Chenla instead established royal intermarriage with the other two polities in the far eastern region, Zhū Jiāng and Cān Bàn; they then waged wars against Tou Yuan who later became a vassal of Dvaravati in 647. According to certain local legends, a princess from Nakhon Pathom married the monarch of Chenla's Isanapura. As cited in the Northern Chronicle, Takkasila (Nakhon Pathom) prince then established Lavapura of Lavo on the eastern plain, a year after Dvaravati won over Tou Yuan.

== History ==
=== Early city-state: 1st – 5th century ===
The earliest and most detailed description of Kamalanka comes from the Chinese Liang dynasty (502–557) record Liáng Shū, which refers to the kingdom of "Lang-ya-xiu" (Chinese: 狼牙脩, Middle Chinese: lɑŋ ŋˠa sɨu) or "Lang-chia-shu", which has been identified with Kamalanka. The record mentions that the kingdom was founded over 400 years earlier, which made its founding likely sometime in the late 1st or early 2nd century. Moreover, the city of "Balangka, an inland town" (บลังกา), mentioned in the Geographike Hyphegesis of Ptolemy in the 2nd century, was potentially Kamalanka. This is consistent with archeological findings in the area, which indicate that a complex culture likely formed during the 2nd century. Several artifacts with Gupta art were scatteredly discovered throughout the ancient Nakhon Pathom.

In this period, several polities emerged in the Chao Phraya River Valley, such as the five kingdoms of Tun Sun on the upper Malay Peninsular, the city state of Chin Lin centered at Mueang Uthong, as well as Si Thep, which has been identified as Qiān Zhī Fú or Ayojjhapura to the northeast. Records about these polities are extremely limited. Tun Sun fell under Funan around 245 CE.

=== Dvaravati period: 6th – 10th century ===
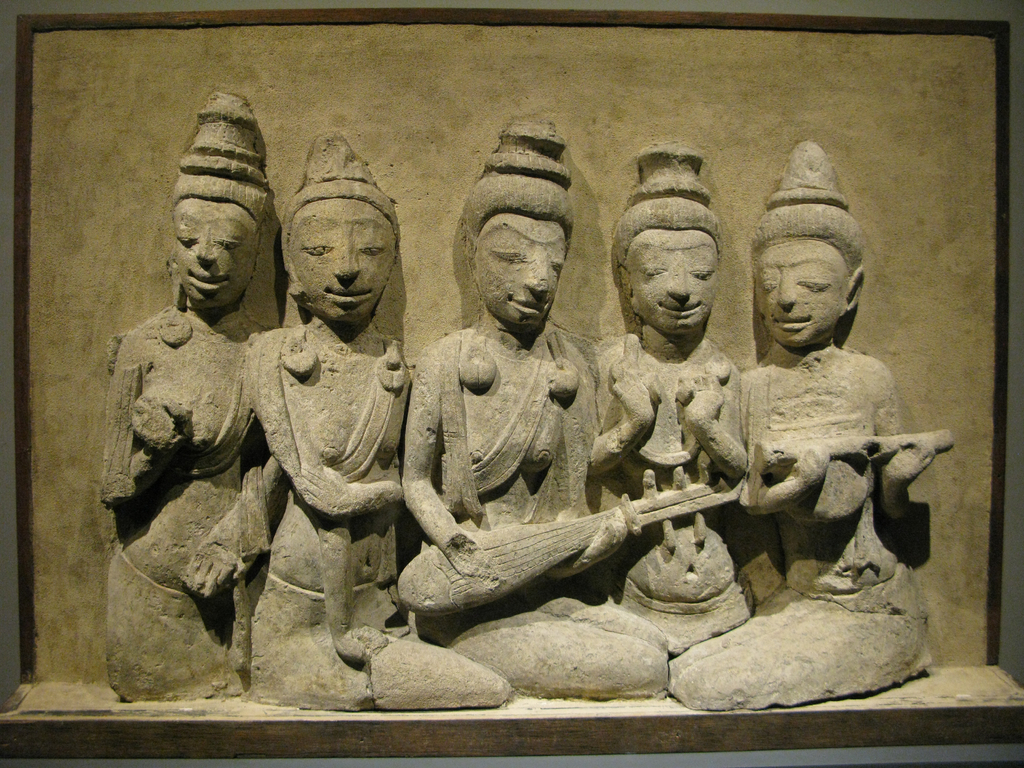
Stucco relief found at Khu Bua archaeological site, dating to 650-700 C.E., Dvaravati culture. Three female musicians on the right are playing (from center) a 5-stringed lute, cymbals, a tube zither or bar zither with a gourd resonator.

In the 6th century, Funan began to decline. Several polities broke away, such as Tou Yuan and Tanling, which later became the vassals of Dvaravati. Kamalanka or Chia-mo-lang-chia probably absorbed Tun Sun and Chin Lin and expanded its territory to the south at the present-day Chumphon province, and to the east met Chenla at present-day Chanthaburi province. It later became part of the Dvaravati civilization. These centuries were considered the Mon-dominant period.

The journey record of a Chinese Buddhist Xuanzang in the 7th century provided the information regarding the location of Kamalanka, which was said to be located to the southeast of Sri Ksetra kingdom, to the west of Dvaravati, and adjoined Pan Pan to the south, with the southernmost territory near the Lang-ya-jiew islands (birds' nest islands) in the present-day Chumphon province. Dvaravati that was thought to have been located at an ancient Nakhon Pathom, but from the evidence of I Ching, it must be moved to the eastern side of the valley. Briggs held that Kamalanka probably extended eastward to the boundary of Chenla north of modern Chanthaburi province in eastern Thailand. He argued from the Liang shu's statement that its east-west extent was one and a half times its north-south extent.

However, due to the overlap in territory claimed in the aforementioned Chiese text I Ching and the area that was expected to be a Funan's dependency, Tun Sun, together with the story given by Lang-ya-hsiu's embassy to the Chinese court regarding the state establishment and gaining independence as well as the disappearance of Tun Sun from the historical record at the beginning of the 6th century, Lang-ya-hsiu was speculated to be the successor state of Tun Sun and later evolved to or merged with Dvaravati. Some scholar locates Kamalanka at the present Mueang Uthong.

In 647, a newly emerged Dvaravati at Kamalanka successfully captured Tou Yuan at Lopburi and established it as the eastern frontier in 648, known as the Lavo Kingdom. They then moved further east and seized Muang Sema area from Qiān Zhī Fú at Si Thep the following century. Japanese scholar Tatsuo Hoshino equates Qiān Zhī Fú with Jiā Luó Shě Fú, which has been identified with Canasapura at Muang Sema, and Gē Luó Shě Fēn mentioned in the Cefu Yuangui is its corrupted term. After losing Muang Sema, Qiān Zhī Fú or Gē Luó Shě Fēn relinquished its control over the Nakhon Ratchasima and Chaiyaphum areas. Its territory receded to the original core in the northern half of the Menam plain and the Pasak Valley, with the seat at Si Thep.

From the 8th to 9th century, the Tais, who were believed to have settled in the north and central Isan region along the trans-Mekong trade route since the 8th century, began to infiltrate the Menam basin to access the sea. They established several petty kingdoms, such as Gān Bì in the vicinity of Savannakhet, Wen Dan in the Chi River Basin, Cān Bàn in the upper Pasak Valley, and Xiū Luó Fēn to the west of Chenla. Their existence were also in the inland Champa kingdom of Zhān Bó as well as Wen Yang (文陽) district, Changzhou prefecture (長州 or 裳州) of the Tang dynasty in modern Sakhon Nakhon and Nakhon Phanom in Thailand and Khammouane province in Laos. The Wen Yang district is identified as the present-day Thakhek in Laos. Given their substantial troop strength—30,000 for Xiū Luó Fēn, 20,000 for Gē Luó Shě Fēn, 5,000 for Gān Bì—they likely participated in the conflicts between Chenla and Dvaravati in the early 7th century, aligning with the faction that offered the greatest advantage. The constant wars against Chenla and Haripuñjaya throughout the 7th to 10th centuries made the Mon Dvaravati begin to wane in power, resulting in their kingdoms being captured by Tambralinga in 927, followed by Angkor in 1001. The Tais then replaced Dvaravati in the western plain, as says in the early 11th century Cefu Yuangui that Gē Luó Shě Fēn was to the west of Dvaravati.

The recorded sequence of rulers at Nakhon Pathom breaks in this period. No ruler is named between Sai Thong Som, whose reign ends in the later 7th century, and Sikaraj, whose reign closes in 807, leaving the first half of the 8th century unaccounted for in the chronicle material. Two separate proposals bear on this interval. Hiram Woodward, who places Si Thep within Wen Dan, suggests that Si Thep may have exercised some control over Nakhon Pathom, together with Lopburi, U Thong, and Khu Bua, during the early 8th century. He further asks whether central Dvaravati should be understood as having pre- and post-Wen Dan phases. As an alternative, he suggests that the Dvaravati features at Si Thep may have resulted from the peaceful movement of monks rather than conquest. He presents these interpretations as possibilities rather than conclusions. The chronicle traditions, for their part, resume the sequence with Padumasūriyavaṁśa of Indaprasthanagara (r. 757–800) and extend his suzerainty over Sukhothai, Lavo and Talung (เมืองตลุง, modern Prakhon Chai district), but not over Nakhon Pathom. The later tradition names Sikaraj, followed by Phraya Kong and Phraya Pan, but these rulers are known from legend rather than contemporary records.

The aforementioned theory is consistent with the movements of the early Siamese dynasties, as evidenced by the Northern Chronicle, Nakhon Si Thammarat Chronicle, and others regarding the stories related to the establishment of the Xiān kingdoms of Suphannaphum and Phrip Phri. The local legend of Phraya Kong–Phraya Pan also mentions a dynastic relation between a Kamalanka monarch and an early Tai city-state in the upper valley; that is, Phraya Pan (r.867–913)—before enthronement as Kamalanka king—was adopted and supported by a Tai king at Sukhodaya to overthrow his predecessor at Nakhon Pathom.

=== Downfall: 11th – 13th century ===
The maximum extent of Srivijaya around the 8th to the 11th century with a series of Srivijayan expeditions and conquest.

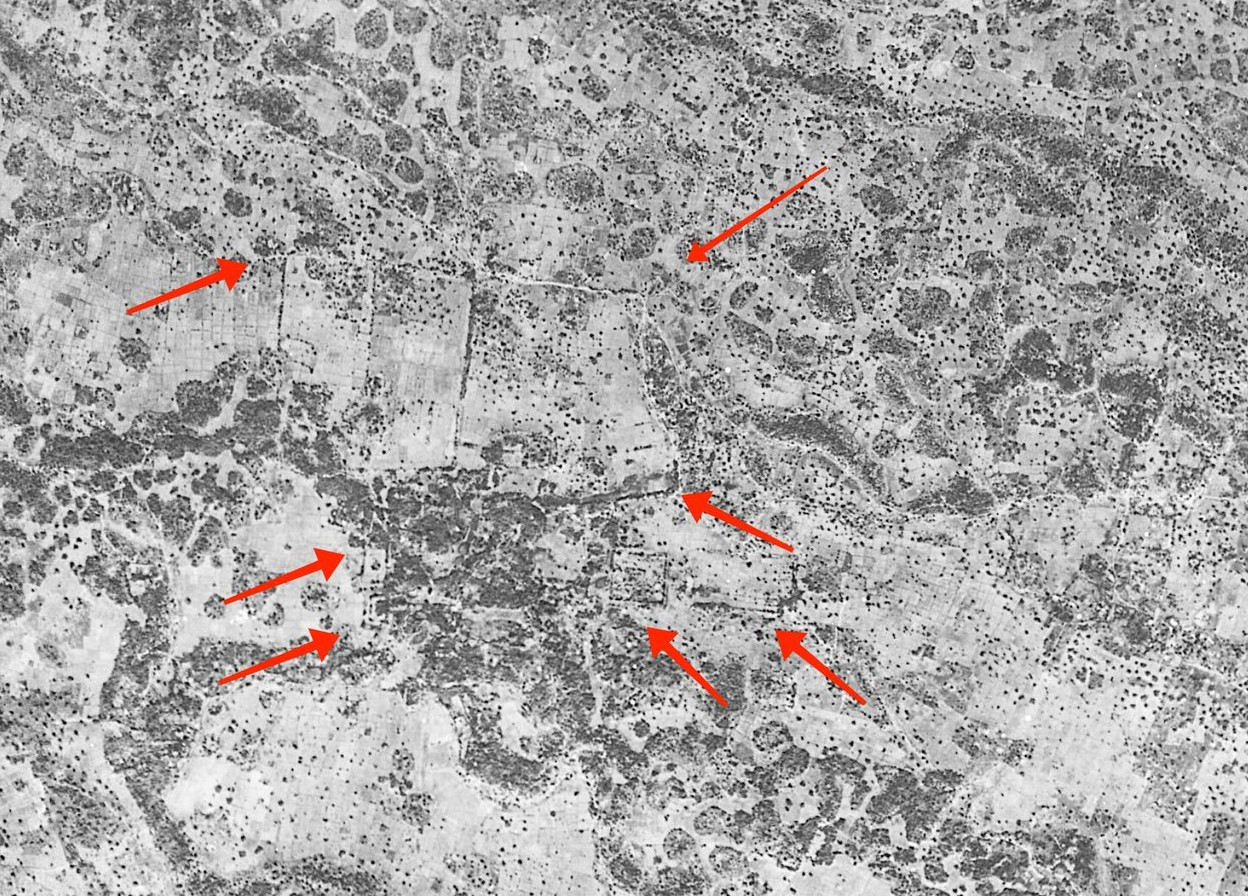
Aerial view of an ancient city in Nong Chaeng village, Sra Krachom subdistrict, Don Chedi, Suphan Buri province in 1953, which was speculated to be Suvarnapura of Chen Li Fu, a successor of Kamalanka. The area is now transformed into an agricultural area.

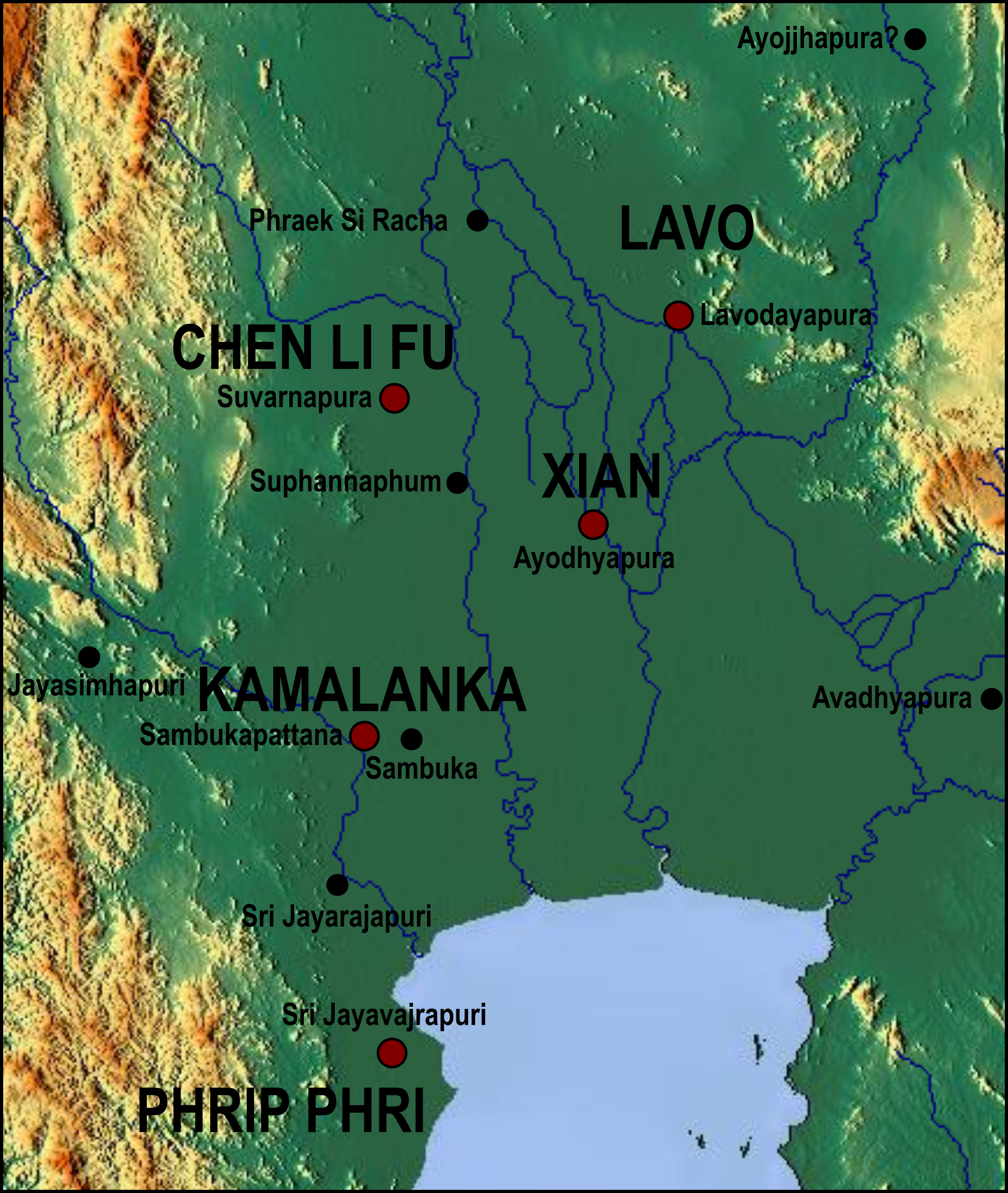
Lower Menam Valley in the 13th century, following the decline of Kamalanka.

The Mon power over the Menam Valley began to decline in the 8th century, followed by the arrivals of the Tais from the Isan region in the 9th–10th centuries. During this period, Kamalanka was influenced by emerging Srivijaya to the south via the maritime trade route, and was referred to by the Chinese as Gē Luó. Around the 9th century, Tai Yuan, another group of the Tais from the north, which later evolved into Lan Na, began to settle in the lower Menam Valley, increased in influence in the region including Lavo to the east. Around the 10th century, former Chin Lin seat at Mueang Uthong declined in opposition to the prosperity of Kamalanka, which rose through the Srivijaya maritime trade network. However, in the Chola invasion of Srivijaya during the early 11th century, the Malay Peninsula was constantly raided by the Sinhalese navy. Kamalanka was also attacked and controlled during the South-East Asia campaign of Rajendra I against Tambralinga and Srivijaya in 1030. Later in the late–11th century, the Kra Isthmus was conquered by the Pagan Kingdom, whose territory expanded southward as far as to the south of present-day Phuket province and controlled the maritime trade between the India Ocean and the South China Sea, as recorded in the Dhammarajaka inscription. This led to the conflict between the Pagan Kingdom and the Sinhalese from the Chola Empire, who was the overload of several polities in the Malay Peninsula at the moment.

Kamalanka's chief city, the ancient Nakhon Pathom, was potentially destroyed in 1058 by King Anawrahta of Pagan during his campaign to conquer the Lavo Kingdom. If not, it might have been weakened since the 925–927 conflicts between two Mon's sister states, Haripuñjaya and Lavo, which led to the conquering of the lower Chao Phraya River Valley by Tambralinga from the south in 927. The city was depopulated during the 11th and 12th centuries as a result of the Bang Kaew River (ลำน้ำบางแก้ว) drying up and becoming shallow, rendering it impassable. After that, Angkorian influence began to infiltrate the region, especially during the reign of Jayavarman VII (r. 1181–1218). The people possibly moved 27 kilometers westward to the Angkorian-influenced polity centered at the ancient Mueang Sa Kosi Narai (เมืองสระโกสินารายณ์) on the bank of the Mae Klong, which was speculated to be Sambukapattana in the Preah Khan inscription. The settlements surrounding the ancient Nakon Pathom, which was referred to as "the city of the Sambuka people", were then subject to this newly created polity. However, Angkor's power over the region remained for a short period and waned following the death of Jayavarman VII in 1218; several key sites then declined. Nakhon Pathom was revived in the Sukhothai period a century later. Meanwhile, Sambukapattana lost its prominence during the early Ayutthaya period, and was abandoned following the second fall of Ayutthaya.

Following the fall of the Dvaravati culture in the 11th century, the tie between Qiān Zhī Fú at Si Thep and other former trans-Mekong confederated city-states in the Chi–Mun Basins, such as Zhān Bó, ended. Qiān Zhī Fú, together with other Tai principalities in the upper Menam Valleys, moved south and absorbed the declining Kamalanka Dvaravati; in addition to Sambukapattana, other two successors, Chen Li Fu and Phrip Phri, were established around the 12th century. Chen Li Fu possibly centered near the Nong Chaeng village in Sra Krachom subdistrict (ตำบลสระกระโจม), Don Chedi, Suphan Buri province, as there are traces of a large ancient city surrounded by a rectangular moat, and was speculated to be Suvarnapura, a city mentioned in the Prasat Phra Khan inscription (จารึกปราสาทพระขรรค์). Some propose that Suvarnapura was at the Nern Thang Phra Archaeological Site (แหล่งโบราณคดีเนินทางพระ), about 20 kilometers northeast of the Nong Chaeng village. Previous scholar said Chen Li Fu was potentially a vassal of or influenced by Angkor or had relatives with the Angkor kings; however, due to the decline in power of Angkor, Chen Li Fu broke away and sent an embassy itself to the Chinese court in 1200. Some argue that it was the independent polity in the mentioned period but instead had a close royal relation with Mahidharapura Kingdoms in the Phimai region. Chen Li Fu was a short-lived kingdom, as it was later subdued in 1204 by Phip Phli's king Mahesvastidrādhirājakṣatriya, who also extended territory further northward to Phraek Si Racha.

== Legends ==
=== Legends of Nakhon Chai Si City and Phra Praton Chedi ===
Names of Nakhon Pathom in different sources
Source	Date	Name
Geographike Hyphegesis	2nd century	Balangka/Kalonga
K.1150 Inscription	6th century	Sambuka
Envoys sent to China	515	Lang-ya-hsiu
Legend of Nakhon Chai Si	590	Tona Brahmin
Legend of Phra Praton Chedi	590–656	Takkasila
Journey of Chang Chun	607	Lang-ya-xiu
Old Book of Tang	618	Lang-ya-xiu
Jinakalamali	mid 7th-c.	Arimadhanaburi
I Ching	671–694	Lang-ya-xiu
Journey of Xuanzang	629–645	Chia-mo-lang-chia
Northern Chronicle	648	Takkasila
K.577 Inscription	8th–9th c.	Sambuka
Legend of Phraya Kong–Phraya Pan	8th–9th c.	Srivijaya/ Nakhon Chai Si
Cefu Yuangui	1005	Ge Luo She Fen (Note: Some scholars placed Ge Luo She Fen or Ge Luo (哥罗国) in the northwestern area of the Bay of Bandon.)
Tanjore Inscription	1030	Mevilimbangam
New Book of Tang	1044	Ge Luo
History of Song	960–1279	Ge Luo
Zhu Fan Zhi	12th–13th c.	Ge Luo
Preah Khan inscription	12th–13th c.	Sambuka(pattana)
Wat Si Chum Inscription	1341–1367	Nakhon Phrakrit (Note: Some source says Nakhon Phrakrit mentioned in the inscription is Lavapura of the Lavo Kingdom.) (lit. 'city of Krishna')
Color key:
Dvaravati sphere / Srivijaya sphere / Angkor sphere
Notes:

ฺBefore the establishment of the chief city of Kamalanka, Nakhon Pathom, previously known as Nakhon Chai Si (นครชัยศรี), there was already a Brahmin village in this area called “Tona Brahmin”. The village was built around a stone house that Brahmins enshrined "Tona" (โทณะ) or the golden bowl used to measure the Buddha's relics. The legendary texts of Phraya Maha Akkanikorn (พระยามหาอรรคนิกร) and Nai Thong (นายทอง) state that this event occurred in 590 CE. The city of Nakhon Chai Si was later founded in the same area by King Siddhijaya Brahmadeva (ศรีสิทธิไชยพรหมเทพ), who was from the city of Manohan or Manohana (มโนหัน/มโนหน) near the border of the city of Yatsothon (ยศโสธร). The king later set Nakhon Chai Si as a new chief city. During this era, this polity established their relations with Sri Lanka via Buddhism; however, after the conflict with the local Brahmin, the king relocated the city 4 kilometers westward to the present-day Phra Pathommachedi area and named the city Pawan or Panan (ปาวัน/ปานัน)

In another version composed by Aong mentions King Sakata (พระยาสกตา) of Takkasila set the new era, Chula Sakarat, in 590 CE, which was the same year that the Brahmins of Tona Brahmin village enshrined a "Tona" in the stone house. His successor, Phraya Kawanadit Thera (กาวัณดิศเถร), expelled those Brahmins to Lavo in 650. Even though the versions of Phraya Maha Akkanikorn and Nai Thong say Kawanadit Thera was instead the King of Lavo, all versions mention Kawanadit Thera built a chedi to cover the stone house containing the tona and named it Phra Prathon Chedi in 656, which conforms to the text given in the Ayutthaya version of the Traibhumi Picture Book (สมุดภาพไตรภูมิ).

The stories provided by these two legends accord with the formation of the Lavo Kingdom given in the Northern Chronicle, thus, Sakkorn Dam, the Chula Sakarat setter, in the Northern Chronicle was doubtlessly Sakata in the Phra Praton Chedi legend. His son, Phraya Kalavarnadisharaja, founded the Lavo Kingdom in 648. And Takkasila mention in several sources was potentially Nakhon Pathom.

=== Fable of Miang Kham ===
In the Fable of Miang Kham, the royal relations between Kamalanka in the western valley and Dvaravati to the east have been told that in 637 CE, the King of Kamalanka named Emperor U Thong, also known as Kakabatr or Sakata in the Legends of Nakhon Chai Si City and Phra Praton Chedi, made a peace agreement and established a royal intermarriage by having his prince, Shridravya (พระยาศรีทรัพย์), married a Chenla princess, E Lert (อีเลิศ; some says princess of Si Thep). Their son was Khun Borom, a legendary progenitor of the Southwestern Tai-speaking peoples. However, previous scholars believe Khun Borom originated from Xiangkhouang in Laos or some mueang in southern China.

During the same period, there were records in the Chinese leishu, Cefu Yuangui, and the Book of Sui that Chenla, during the reign of Bhavavarman II (r. 639–657), allied via royal intermarriage with the Zhū Jiāng Kingdom, one of the Dvaravati polities. They then waged wars against Tou Yuan to the northwest, who had fallen under Kamalanka Dvaravati since 647. Some suggests that the son of Si Thep king named Bhavavarman mentioned in the Ban Wang Pai Inscription (K. 978) founded in the Phetchabun province of Thailand was probably Bhavavarman II instead of Bhavavarman I (r. 580–598) due to the inscription styles that potentially inscribed after 627.

The aforementioned royal intermarriage may have enabled another son of Kakabatr named Kalavarnadisharaja to establish his polity, known as the Lavo Kingdom, in the eastern Menam Valley in 648, a year after Dvaravati won over Tou Yuan.

=== Legend of Phraya Kong – Phraya Pan ===
The legend of Phraya Kong–Phraya Pan, which provides slightly different details in each version, has been told in the western Chao Phraya region. The story begins with a line of Sikaraj, king of Srivijaya (ศรีวิชัย, Nakhon Pathom; Northern Chronicle says an ancient Kanchanaburi) whose power extent south to Ratchaburi. His son, Kong, succeeded him. Due to the prophecy that his son would kill him, Kong ordered his newborn son to be killed, but his queen consort secretly gave the child to a commoner named Yai Hom (ยายหอม; lit. 'the elder Hom'), who named the boy Pan (พาน). Pan was later adopted by the king of Ratchaburi, who stopped paying tribute to King Kong on Pan's suggestion, causing Kong to attack Ratchaburi, but unfortunately was slaughtered by Pan in the battle. Pan was enthroned as the king of Srivijaya, and after he realized that Kong was his father, Pan built a large chedi, which is believed to be the Phra Pathommachedi, atoning for his sin. However, this part of the legend is believed to be influenced by the story being told in the Puranas. Some say that it was adapted from a Sanskrit fable, which in turn was derived from the Greek Oedipus.

The other two versions by Phraya Ratchasamparakorn (พระยาราชสัมภารากร) and Ta Pakhao Rot (ตาปะขาวรอต) say that after Pan was adopted by the King of Ratchaburi, he then travelled north to Sukhothai, where he also became the adoptive son of the king of Sukhothai. With Sukhothai's support, he moved south and overthrew Kong at Nakhon Pathom.

The Northern Chronicle and Jinakalamali additionally provide the expansion of the influence of Pan northward and being enthroned as the king of Haripuñjaya during 913–916, while the southern territory in the western Menam Valley was overthrown by his adoptive father, King of Ratchaburi. Before Pan's journey to the north, he established several cities in the western Menam Valley, including Suphan Buri, where his son, Pansa, was the first ruler. Suphan Buri was the capital of Suphannabhum, a Siamese polity that later formed part of the Ayutthaya Kingdom in 1351. In the Lan Na's Yonok Chronicle, mentions King Chandra Devaraja (จันทรเทวราช) lost Suphannabhum to unspecified invader (probably Tambralinga's king Sujita from Lavo, proposed by Borihan Thepthani) and his two princes, Ādityarāja (อาทิตตะราช) and Chandrachota, fled to Haripuñjaya. The older prince, Thamikaraj, later became Haripuñjaya's king in his later life, while the younger reclaimed the throne at Lavo's Lavapura from Angkor in 1052.

After Pan lost the throne to his adoptive father, the Menam Valley entered the collapsing period with a decade-long fighting between two Mon sister kingdoms, Haripuñjaya and Lavo, which also weakened Kamalanka, continue to the valley being conquered by Tambralinga in 927, the fall of Rāmaññadesa in 946, the destruction of Lavo's Lavapura by Angkor in 1001, constant raided by the Chola in 1030, the devastation of the western valley by the Pagan in 1058.

== List of rulers ==
Name		Reign	Notes
English	Thai	Reign	Notes
Mon people dominated the kingdom since the 6th century.
Before the 6th century, the settlements around the present-day Nakhon Pathom were probably under Mueang Uthong, the chief city of Chin Lin.
In the early era, the settlements were ruled by a group of Brahmins.
Tona Brahmin	โทณพราหมณ์	?–569	
Kakabhadra/Sakata/Sakkorndam	กากะพัตร/สกตา/สักกรดำ	569–641	As king of Takkasila (Nakhon Pathom).; Chula Sakarat setter.; Royal intermarriage with either Chenla or Qiān Zhī Fú at Si Thep established.
Siddhijaya Brahmadeva	สิทธิไชยพรหมเทพ	590–616	From Manohan or Manohana (equated with Ayojjhapura in the Jinakalamali); Founded Nakhon Chaisi (Nakhon Pathom) and set it as his new seat.; Political overlap with Kakabhadra
Kalavarnadisharaja	กาฬวรรณดิศ/ กาวัณดิศราช	641–648	Son of Kakabhadra; Later King of Lavo (r. 648–700)
Cakranarayana	จักรนารายณ์	648–649?	Younger brother of the previous?
Shridravya	ศรีทรัพย์	648–649?	Based on a local fable.; Married a princess of either Chenla or Qiān Zhī Fú.
Qizhangmo 齊杖摩	ศรีทรัพย์	648–649?	As king of Tuo-he-luo; Recorded without a surname, unlike his successor.
The Chinese sources name two rulers of Tou-he but do not state how they were related; the notice of Qizhangmo is introduced as the testimony of local elders, and an undetermined number of reigns may fall between the two.
Pu xie qi yao 脯邪乞遙		c. 649–656	As king of Tuo-he-luo (投和國; Dvaravati); Ruled several cities indirectly.; Last tributary mission from Tou-he to China in 649.
Pú jiā yuè mó		fl. 656–665	As king of Gē Luó Shě Fēn; Potentially a dual monarchy of Kamalanka and Qiān Zhī Fú
The line was split into two seats: Ayojjhapura at Si Thep and Arimadhanaburi at Nakhon Pathom
Anuruddha	อนุรุธ	c. 665?–688	As king of Arimadhanaburi (อริมัทนบุรี); Attack Qiān at Si Thep
Sai Thong Som	ใสทองสม	688–?	Based on legend; Younger son of Balidhiraja (พาลีธิราช), the king of Sukhothai
No ruler recorded between Sai Thong Som and Sikaraj. Woodward proposes that Si Thep, within Wen Dan, may have held Nakhon Pathom in the first half of the 8th century.
Emergence of Indaprasthanagara in 757. The traditions give Padumasūriyavaṁśa (r. 757–800) suzerainty over Sukhothai, Lavo and Talung, but not over Nakhon Pathom.
Mon's power declined. Kamalanka then fell under the influence of Srivijaya since the 8th century. During this period, its chief city at Nakhon Pathom was also called Srivijaya, as per the Legend of Phraya Kong–Phraya Pan.
Sikaraj	สิการาช	?–807	Based on legends.
Phraya Kong	พระยากง	807–867	Son of the previous. Based on legends.
Phraya Pan	พระยาพาน	867–913	Son of the previous. Based on legends. Later King of Haripuñjaya (r. 899, 913–916); Father of Pansa, the first king of Suphannabhum
King of Ratchaburi (unknown regnal name)		913–927?	Usurper. Adoptive father of the previous.
Rulers after the King of Ratchaburi remain unknown.
Menam Valley was conquered by Tambralinga in 927. Mevilimbangam was attacked by the Chola in 1030, and later destroyed by the Pagan in 1058. After that, Kamalanka declined and several petty kingdoms emerged in the western valley, such as Chen Li Fu (12th century–1204), Suphannabhum (12th century–1438), Phrip Phri (1157/58 or 1188–1351). All of which later became parts of the Xiān's Ayutthaya Kingdom.
