= Chin Lin =

1st–6th century political entities

Chin Lin/Kim Lin (金鄰/金邻国) (จินหลิน/กิมหลิน)
- 9 CE–c. 8th century CE
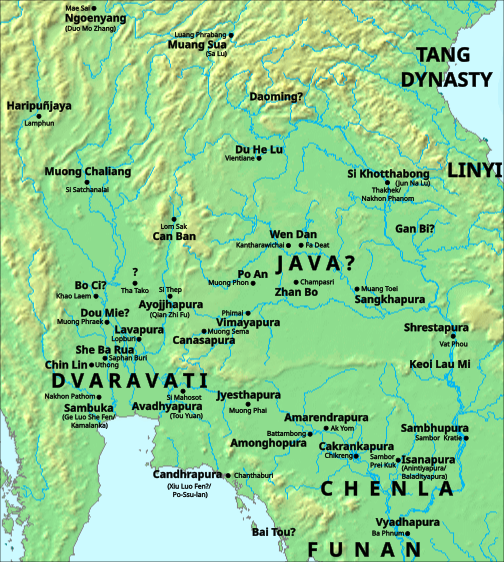
- Proposed locations of ancient kingdoms in Menam and Mekong Valleys in the 7th century based on the details provided in the Chinese leishu, Cefu Yuangui, and others.
- Capital: Mueang Uthong?
- Religion: Buddhism; Brahmanism
- Historical era: 9 CE – 8th century CE
  - Established: 9 CE
  - Disestablished: c. 8th century CE
Preceded by
Mon city-states
Succeeded by
Dvaravati
Kamalanka
She Ba Ruo
Duō Miè
- Today part of: Thailand; Myanmar

Chin Lin or Kim Lin (Chinese: 金鄰/金邻; Thai: จินหลิน/กิมหลิน; lit. 'golden/wealthy neighbor') was an ancient political entity of mainland Southeast Asia whose location is disputed: it has been placed in modern lower central Thailand, and by Briggs in the Thaton-Martaban region of Myanmar. It appears in Chinese records between 9 CE and the 3rd century, while epigraphic evidence from the same area indicates that a line seated at the same centre persisted into the 7th and 8th centuries.

In the 3rd century CE, Fan Man, king of Funan, attacked more than ten kingdoms across the sea, among them Ch'ü-tu-k'un, Chiu-chih and Tien-sun (Tun Sun). He then turned against Chin Lin, according to the Liang shu in the translation Briggs took from Pelliot. G. H. Luce read the campaign as a move to outflank Chin Lin by taking the trans-Kra Isthmus route, a reading Wheatley reported while surveying opinion on the location of Tun Sun. The same passage ends with Fan Man falling ill before he could subdue Chin Lin. Briggs took Chin Lin to have remained unconquered, and free of Funan.

The city "Balangka, an inland town" (บลังกา), mentioned in the Geographike Hyphegesis of Ptolemy in the 2nd century, has been assumed by Thai scholars to have been Mueang Uthong, the center of Chin Lin. However, some identified Balangka with the ancient Nakhon Pathom.

== Location ==
The location of Chin Lin remains unclear. Among the standing problems with the Chinese records, Miriam Stark counts the difficulty of tying their place names to points on the ground. It was first mentioned around 9 – 22 CE during the late Western Han period, a Chinese emperor Wang Mang sent an embassy to visit Chin-lin. Chin Lin is mentioned again in the 3rd century, in the account of the conquests of the Funan king Fan Shih-man in the Liang shu. For its position Briggs relied not on that text but on later ones quoted by Pelliot, which have four kingdoms, among them Ta-k'un (Ch'ü-tu-k'un) and Chü-li, lying 3,000 li to the south of Chin Lin; he added that the identification of Ta-k'un is not established. Pelliot equated Chü-li with Kou-chih, and Wheatley identified both with the Kole polis of Ptolemy, which he located on the estuary of the Kuantan River in Malaysia. Earlier Chinese compilations give a different bearing and a different figure. The Yiwu Zhi states that Jinlin, also written Jinchen, lay rather more than 2,000 li from Funan, while the Waiguo Zhuan places it the same distance to the west of Funan; neither reckons the distance from the isthmian polities. The Funan Ji of Zhu Zhi adds that the country of Linyang (林陽) lay 2,000 li from Jinchen and could be reached only overland, by horse, there being no route by water—an observation that has been read as placing Jinchen inland rather than on the coast—and that its people were wholly Buddhist. The same work notes a monsoon regime in which rain began in the fourth month and ceased in the sixth, with few clear days between. Palmer Briggs proposes that Chin-lin and its southern neighbor, Tun Sun, was the Mon countries. The boundary between these two entities was ill-defined, but probably not far above the present Mergui in Tanintharyi Region. Briggs placed Chin Lin itself outside the Thai side of the peninsula, in the Thaton-Martaban region of Myanmar, following the general identification of it with the Suvaṇṇabhūmi of the Pali writers, and took its territory to include Tavoy. Hall glossed Chin Lin as lower Burma, and reported Loofs as taking it into a cultural zone that reached Funan and was inhabited by Mon-Khmer and Pyu populations. Wheatley, following Braddell, placed Chin Lin around the northern shores of the Gulf of Siam instead. He used that placement against Briggs, who had read the Liang shu's statement that Tun Sun projected into the sea for more than 1,000 li to mean that part of Tun Sun bordered the same shore. Wheatley objected that the region was already occupied by Chin Lin, and took the passage to describe the peninsula rather than Tun Sun itself. Karen Mudar, citing Wheatley's study of 1983, reports the polities of Tun Sun taken by Funan as lying on the shores of the Bay of Bangkok and subordinate to it, rather than on the isthmus.

== Description ==
The Chinese notices are brief but consistent on the country's resources. The Yiwu Zhi records that the land held deposits of silver, and that its people were much given to hunting elephants, riding them when there was need and taking only the tusks once the animals died. The name itself, which may be rendered "golden neighbour", has been connected with this reputation for metals, although the sources do not make the link explicit.

== Rulers ==
The copper plate dating from the 6th–mid 7th centuries found at U Thong mentions King Harshavarman (หรรษวรมัน), who was assumed by Jean Boisselier to be one of the kings of Dvaravati, while George Cœdès considered the plate was brought from the Angkor, and the name mentioned might be the Khmer king as well. Nonetheless, the timeframes appear disconnected, as King Harshavarman I of Khmer ruled from 910 to 923, two centuries after the date of the inscription, and Harshavarman I's grandfather was Indravarman I, not Isanavarman as the inscription mentioned. Michael Vickery instead proposed that the Harshavarman of the plate belonged to a line descending from Isanavarman I of Chenla (r. 616–637), parallel to Prakāśadharma, another of that king's grandsons, who acceded to the Cham throne at Mỹ Sơn in 658. On this reading the connection was formed by the marriage of a princess of Chenla to a prince of Dvaravati, an alliance also preserved in a local fable of the Chao Phraya valley, with Harshavarman the offspring of that union and subsequently ruler at U Thong. This places him in the later 7th century rather than the mid-6th. For the century that follows, in which the article's ruler list records no name, Hiram Woodward has proposed that Si Thep, which he places within the polity known from Tang Chinese records as Wen Dan, may have exercised some control over U Thong together with Lopburi, Nakhon Pathom and Khu Bua; he gives this as a possibility rather than a finding. He also attributes a stone Buddha in the Cleveland Museum of Art to an 8th-century Si Thep workshop whose facial modelling derives from the stuccos of U Thong or Nakhon Pathom. Mudar reads the plate from the settlement evidence rather than the epigraphy. Measuring the moated settlements of the central plain from aerial photographs, she put the enclosure at U Thong at 73.3 ha, which ranks it a district centre in her four-level administrative hierarchy and no higher than a minor centre by the 10th century; on that basis she suggested that a royal inscription there may record the loss of an earlier autonomy and the town's absorption into a wider regional system rather than the presence of a court.

Ruler	Reign	Notes/Contemporary events
Rulers before the early 7th century remain unknown.
Unknown	Early 7th c.	Father of the following, seated at U Thong.; Linked by marriage to the house of Isanavarman I of Chenla (r. 616–637), who is named in the copper plate.
Harshavarman	Late 7th c.	Son of the previous.; Named in the Copper Plate Inscription of Mueang Uthong.
Due to the rise of the Sri Vijaya maritime trade route, Nakhon Pathom of Kamalanka became more prosperous, and the political center of the region was then shifted to this new polity in the 6th–7th century. The period is considered the beginning of the Dvaravati civilization.
Rulers after Harshavarman remain unknown.
Maratha?	8th c.	
