= Tou Yuan =

7 century political entity

Tou Yuan Kingdom 陀洹/陁洹 (Chinese) Tuó yuán
- 600s – 650s
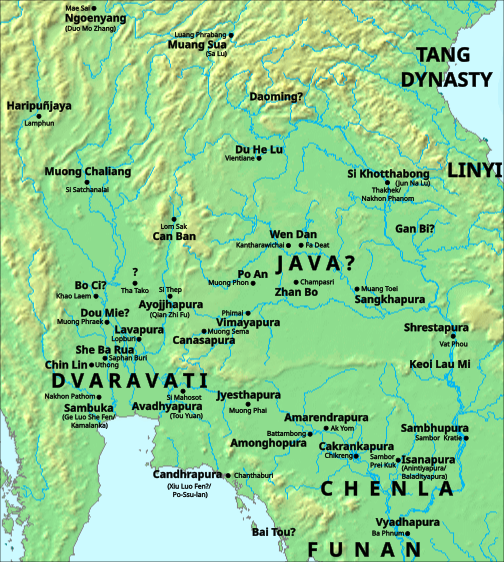
- Proposed locations of ancient kingdoms in Menam and Mekong Valleys in the 7th century based on the details provided in the Chinese leishu, Cefu Yuangui, and others.
- Capital: Si Mahosot
- Historical era: Post-classical era
  - Formation: Early 7th-c.
  - First tribute sent to China: 643
  - Vassal of Dvaravati: 647
  - Dvaravati's Lavo established: 648
  - Last mention by Chinese: 651
Succeeded by
Dvaravati; Lavo
- Today part of: Thailand

Tou Yuan or Tuó Huán (Chinese: 陁洹国、 陀洹国) or Zhēn Tuó Huán (真陀洹、真陁洹) or Nòu Tuó Huán (耨陀洹) or Rù Tuó Huán (褥陀洹) was a short-lived ancient Mon political entity that existed in the present-day Si Mahosot in central Thailand before the establishment of the Lavo in 648. It was annexed by Dvaravati in 647.

It was part of the Mon's settlements, located southwest of Champa, southeast of Dvaravati, bordering Funan north of modern Chanthaburi province, and adjoined Duō Miè to the west. Record of the Sui dynasty, which ruled China in 581–618 CE, says Tou Yuan fought many wars against Zhenla, who, at the same time, also had a conflict with Línyì to the northeast. The warfare between Chenla and Tou Yuan's successor state, Dvaravati's Lavo, continued into the Tang period. Certain battles may have been associated with the wars between Lavo and its northern sister Monic kingdom, Haripuñjaya, occurring in the early 10th century.

In contrast, Zhenla established peace relations via royal intermarriage with two other neighbors, Zhū Jiāng — which is identified as one of the Dvaravati-influenced polities — and Cān Bàn. However, Cān Bàn later became Zhenla's vassal, until the disintegration in the late 7th century, when it instead was under Wen Dan.

== Location ==
According to the details given in the Chinese leishu, Cefu Yuangui, compiled during the Song dynasty (960–1279 CE), Tou Yuan was situated southwest of Linyi in the middle of the sea and is bordered by Duohuoluo (墮和羅; Dvaravati), and met the kingdom of Duō Miè (多蔑国) to the west. It is a three-month and several days journey from Jiaozhi (交趾). The Tongdian gives an incompatible bearing, placing Tuo Yuan to the north-west of Duohuoluo rather than to its south-east, and records a mission of the Zhenguan era bringing a white parrot with several dozen red feathers on its head. The Jiu Tang Shu reckons the journey as ninety days from Guangzhou, a different point of departure from the three months and more from Jiaozhi given in the Cefu Yuangui. The discrepancy bears directly on the proposed locations, since a position north-west of Dvaravati would be difficult to reconcile with an identification in the east of Thailand. Geoffrey Goble speculates it is possibly on the Malay peninsular, whereas Lawrence P. Briggs located it in the east of Thailand near the present-Chanthaburi. A Japanese scholar, Tatsuo Hoshino, identified Tou Yuan with Lopburi before the establishment of Lavo Kingdom in 648 and placed an early Dvaravati in the Bang Pakong Basin in eastern Thailand. Dvaravati expanded its influence to the Lavo in 648 and later to Canasapura's Mueang Sema in the 8th century. The political center of Dvaravati in the eastern plain was then moved to a newly established Lavo Kingdom, while the western part was centered at Kamalanka's Nakhon Pathom.

However, according to local sources—most notably the Northern Chronicle—the construction of Lopburi is said to have commenced in 629 and to have been completed in 648, (Note: The Northern Chronicle states that the city of Lavo's Lavapura took 19 years to complete in 648, thus, the construction might have begun in 629.) the latter date traditionally associated with the establishment of the Lavo Kingdom. Since Tou Yuan is recorded as having dispatched a tributary mission to China in 643, this chronology suggests that Lopburi could not yet have served as the political center of Tou Yuan, contrary to the hypothesis advanced by Tatsuo Hoshino. In contrast, the Thai scholar Piriya Krairiksh has proposed that Tou Yuan should be identified with Si Mahosot, a location whose geographical characteristics correspond more closely to those described in the Chinese sources.

== Society ==
Tou Yuan became the vassal of Dvaravati in 647. It sent envoys to the Chinese court several times between 643 and 647; the Cefu Yuangui enters a mission in the seventeenth year of Zhenguan (643) and another in the third month of the twenty-first year (647). In 647, Tou Yuan present a white parrot and baros ointment as tributes to China, yet they requested horses and copper bells and there was an edict granting them both. Its king's surname is Chashili 察失利 and his given name is Pomopona 婆末婆那. The Tongdian separates the elements differently, giving the personal name as Pona (婆那), the surname as Chashili (察失利) and Pomo (婆末) as a courtesy name, so that the compound form Pomopona may combine two distinct elements rather than record a single given name. The same entry reckons the journey as ninety days from Guangzhou.

The land is without silkworms and mulberry. They make clothes of lustrous white and rosy dawn-colored cloth. They have rice paddies, barley, hemp, and legumes. They raise white elephants, cows, sheep, and swine. Their custom is that everyone lives in elevated buildings (樓) called ‘dry pavilions’ (ganlan 干欄).

When their relatives die they do not eat in their room. After cremating the corpse they pick out the cremains and wash them in a pool. Thereafter, they will eat.
