= Gān Jūn Kingdom =

Ancient kingdom in central Vietnam

- 7th century
- Government: Kingdom
  - Unknown: Qí-tuó Yuè-mó
- Historical era: Post-classical era
- Today part of: Vietnam; Laos

Gān Jūn Kingdom (Chinese: 甘军国，甘軍国) was an ancient kingdom mentioned in the Chinese leishu, Cefu Yuangui, compiled during the Song dynasty (960–1279 CE). It was located on the coast of the South China Sea, bordering Linyi to the east. Its king is named Qí-tuó Yuè-mó (旗陁越摩), and he has 5,000 elite soldiers.

No further information about the Gān Jūn Kingdom has been found, and its identification is uncertain. Some cite that it is probably the mistaken name of Gān Bì (甘畢，甘必) in the New Book of Tang volume 222 says it is on South China Sea. It bordered east to the Huán Wáng Kingdom (環王國; Champa). Its king is named Zhān Tuó Yuè Mó (旃陀越摩, Chandavema), who also has 5,000 elite soldiers. Some say it was located on the island of Sumatra in present-day Indonesia.
