= Four Great Books of Song =

Collection of four Chinese books

The Four Great Books of Song (simplified Chinese: 宋四大书; traditional Chinese: 宋四大書; pinyin: Sòng sì dà shū) was compiled by a team of scholars during the Song dynasty (960–1279). The term was coined after the last book (Cefu Yuangui) was finished during the 11th century. The four encyclopedias were published and intended to collect the whole knowledge of the new state.

The four books are:

- The Taiping Yulan is a general-purpose leishu encyclopedia.
- The Taiping Guangji is a collection of deities, fairies, ghost stories and theology.
- The Wenyuan Yinghua is an anthology of poetry, odes, songs and other writings.
- The Cefu Yuangui is a leishu encyclopedia of political essays, autobiographies, memorials and decrees.

== See also ==
- Chinese classic texts
