= Tanling =

7th century political entity

Tanling Kingdom 曇陵國 (Chinese) Tán líng guó
- Early – late 7th century
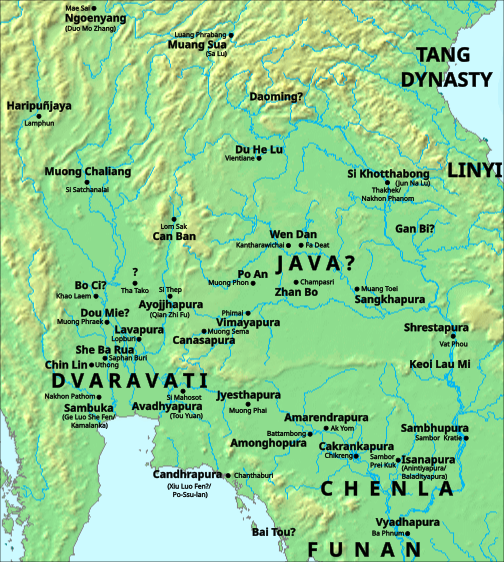
- Proposed locations of ancient kingdoms in Menam and Mekong Valleys in the 7th century based on the details provided in the Chinese leishu, Cefu Yuangui, and others.
- Historical era: Post-classical era
  - Formation: Early 7th century
  - Sent tribute to China: 644
  - Annexed by Dvaravati: Late 7th century
Preceded by	Succeeded by
Funan	Dvaravati
- Today part of: Thailand; Myanmar

Tanling (Chinese: 曇陵) was an ancient political entity mentioned in the Chinese Tang Huiyao. It was located on the Malay peninsular, potentially in the present-day Thailand and Myanmar. Tanling was one of the vassal states of Dvaravati.

Tanling sent tribute to China in the 16th year of the Zhenguan era (644).

== Location ==
As mentioned in the Tang Huiyao volume 99, Tanling was located on the island in the Malay peninsular. Scholars suggest that it was properly in the present Trang province of Thailand or Tenasserim region in Myanmar or some island in the swamp area of the early historic Bay of Bangkok. Some believes it was the Tan-ma-ling Tambralinga.
