= Tun Sun =

1st–5th century political entities

Tun Sun/Tian-Sun/Tu-Kun (頓遜/典遜/都昆) (เทียนสน)
- 52 CE–6th century
- Territory of Tun Sun (1st-6th centuries CE) and the neighbors. Dark Green: Territory before gaining independence from Funan, proposed by Lawrence Palmer Briggs in 1950; Light Green: As Kamalanka, territory expanded after gaining independence, proposed by George Cœdès in 1924
- Capital: Pong Tuk or Nakhon Pathom
- Common languages: Monic languages
- Religion: Buddhism; Brahmanism
- Historical era: Proto-Dvaravati era
  - Established: 52 CE
  - Subdued by Funan: Before 245 CE
  - Dependency of Funan: Before 245 – Late 5th century
  - Merged into Lang-chia: 6th century
  - Disestablished: 6th century
Preceded by	Succeeded by
Mon city-states	Funan; Kamalanka
- Today part of: Thailand; Myanmar

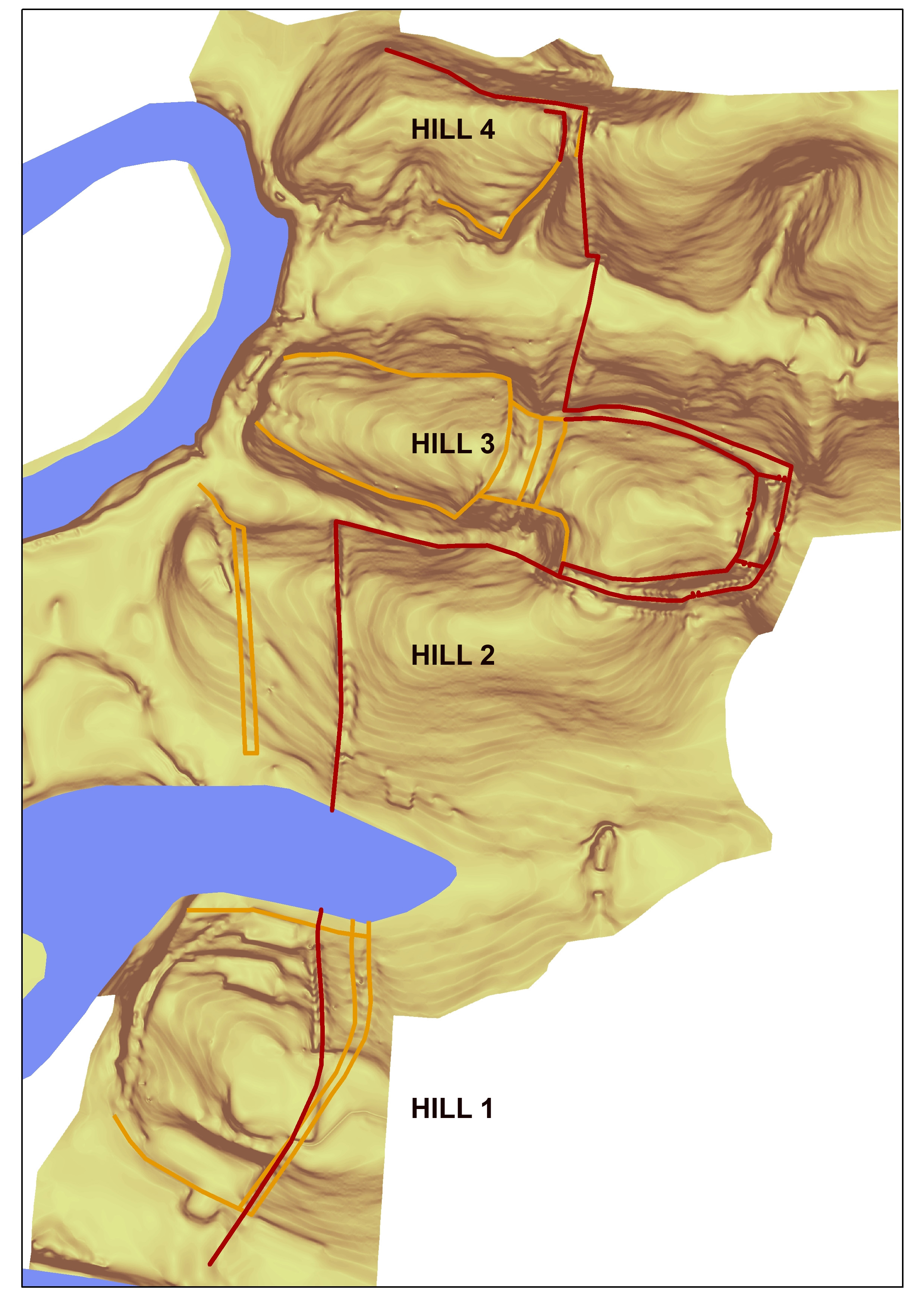
Map of the ancient port city of Khao Sam Kaeo, one of the earliest settlements in Tun Sun territory (est. 4th century BCE), showing the four hills that make up the settlement. Red lines denote earthen walls at the site.

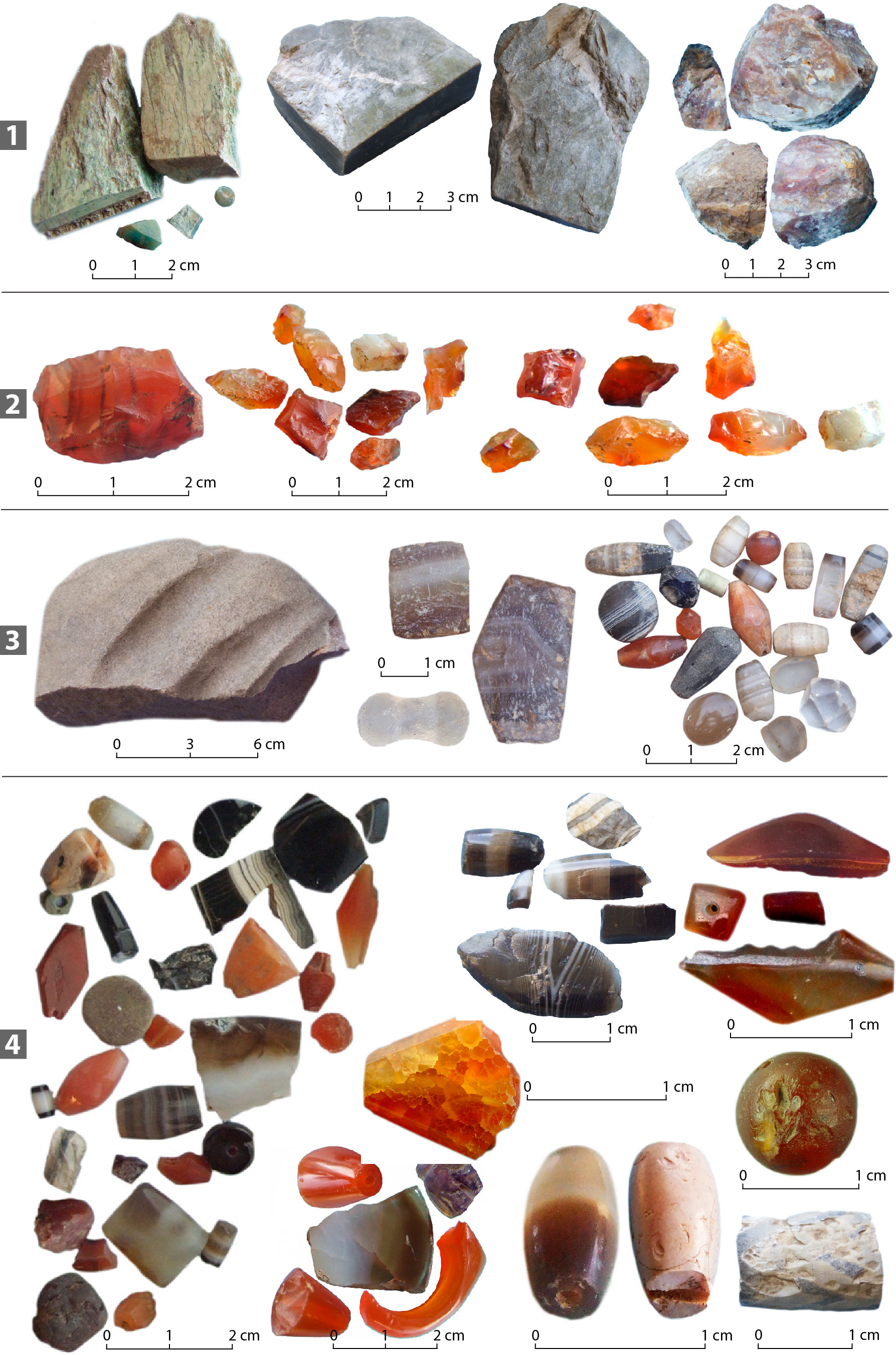
Beads found at Khao Sam Kaeo, an archaeometallurgical crossroads for trans-Asiatic trade route.

Tun Sun (Chinese: 頓遜) or Tian-Sun or Tien-Sun (Chinese: 典遜; Thai: เทียนสน) or Tu-k'un/Tou-k'ouen/Ch'u-tu-k'un (都昆), (Note: The equation is Luce's, reported by Briggs, who notes that the Liang shu names Ch'ü-tu-k'un and Tien-sun separately in the same paragraph; R. A. Stein instead identified Ch'ü-tu with Kattigara near Baria in Cochinchina. Wheatley likewise lists the two as separate kingdoms among the more than ten that Fan-man attacked across the sea. The page-305 form is from the volume's glossary, which its editor prepared and which states that its equals sign is not always an exact equivalence.) was a group of five ancient Mon political entities on the Malay Peninsula. Its location is disputed. Wheatley placed it across the Kra Isthmus in southern Thailand, Schlegel identified it with Tenasserim in Myanmar, and Briggs extended it to the northern shore of the Gulf of Siam. On his reading it reached lower central Thailand, taking in part of the Mae Klong and Chao Phraya delta. It is dated to the 1st to 6th centuries CE, its disappearance being placed about the beginning of the 6th, although the Chinese notices of it describe the 3rd century.

According to the 3rd-century Nan chou i wu chih, Tun Sun was originally an independent kingdom; a king of Funan named Fan-man seized it, and by about 245–250 it was subject to Funan. The Liang shu describes it as a mart where east and west met on the sea route between India and China. Its people included more than a thousand Indian Brahmans who married local women, a description Wheatley regarded as one of the earliest explicit accounts of Indian cultural influence in Southeast Asia. Tun Sun disappeared from history about the beginning of the 6th century CE, when the principalities of Dvaravati emerged in central Thailand and Kamalanka arose centred on the former Tun Sun.

== Etymology ==
Because the Chinese accounts give Tun Sun five kings, the etymology of the name given by the Chinese is relevant. The number five in the Nyah Kur language, the ancient Mon language spoken by the thousands of Nyah Kur people of Dvaravati Mon descent, is pronounced Chuun, while Duinr means "kingdom" or "country"; the name has accordingly been interpreted to mean that Tun Sun was a confederation of five territories. The number also matches the legendary state of Suvarnabhumi, which Thai scholars have claimed existed from the late 2nd century BCE to the 2nd century CE in modern central Thailand. In that account it consisted of five royal cities in the upper Malaysian peninsula, Suvarnabhumi (the old town of Nakhon Pathom), Ratchaburi, Mueang Sing, Phetchaburi and Tanintharyi, probably with a further dependency, Lamphakappa Nakhon (ลัมภกัปปะนคร, present-day Lampang), in the north. Schlegel proposed two derivations. He took the Chinese forms to transcribe an old Siamese Dŏn-suén, "the land of gardens", noting that 典 is pronounced tin in Cantonese. He gave more weight to the second, in which the Malay name Tānah sāri, "land of flowers", records the quantity of flowers the country produced and yields the later forms Tenasserim and Tănaosí; he traced that name through Abdur-razzāk in 1442, Barbosa in 1516 and the Āʾīn-i-Akbarī of about 1590. Wheatley rejected the Siamese derivation because Tai speakers did not settle the isthmus until nearly a thousand years later.

== History ==
According to the Guangdong Tongzhi, Tun Sun made a vassal of its southern neighbour, Gē Luó Fù Shā (哥羅富沙), on the Kra Isthmus and in the Bandon Bay area in the late 1st century. The 3rd-century Nan chou i wu chih states that Tun Sun was originally an independent kingdom; a former king of Funan named Fan-man seized it, and by the time of the mission of K'ang T'ai to Funan in about 245–250 it was subject to Funan. The Liang shu lists Tien-sun among more than ten kingdoms across the sea that Fan-man attacked before turning against Chin Lin. The Liang shu also relates a story of an Indian named Kaundinya who visited Tun Sun, received a divine message that he was to rule Funan, and went on to do so; the story is the myth of the later Khmer Empire. Stark notes that the documentary scenarios in which Funan's rulers controlled parts of the Malay Peninsula and of central and southern Thailand have been questioned, citing Claude Jacques, Michael Vickery and her own work.

Tun Sun disappeared from history about the beginning of the 6th century CE, when new principalities of Dvaravati emerged in central Thailand. Kamalanka was centred on the former Tun Sun. In Briggs's account a country the Chinese called Lang-ya-hsiu appeared in its place, covering apparently all its territory. It sent its first embassy to China in 516. Chenla replaced Funan about the middle of the same century.

== Location ==
The exact location of Tun Sun is unclear. Miriam Stark has summarised the earlier criticism of the Chinese records on which such identifications rest. She names copying errors between generations of texts, a bias toward the centres that traded with China, and the difficulty of tying Chinese place names to points on the ground. The Liang shu places it more than 3,000 li from the southern frontier of Funan and gives its land as 1,000 li in extent, with its city ten li from the sea. The T'ung tien reverses the bearing, putting Tun Sun's northern frontier some 3,000 li from Funan. Wheatley read the notice as describing a country that occupied the whole breadth of the isthmus, from the east to the west coast, with a capital that lay on a river but which he did not identify. Briggs held that its border with its northern neighbour, Chin Lin, was ill-defined but probably lay not far above the present Mergui in Tanintharyi Region. To the south, in his account, it met the kingdom of Chü-li (Takola, speculated to be Pan Pan) near the Kra Isthmus. Wheatley, following Roland Braddell, placed Chin Lin around the northern shore of the Gulf of Siam and argued that Tun Sun therefore cannot have extended there. He read the Liang shu's statement that it projected into the sea for more than 1,000 li as a description of the peninsula rather than of Tun Sun itself.

Schlegel identified Tun Sun with Tenasserim in Myanmar, matching the ten-li figure to the distance of that town from the sea. In his translation the country lay on a steep hill in the sea, while the encyclopaedia San-tsai Tu-hwui placed it on an island. Pelliot and Luce placed it on the Isthmus of Kra. Pelliot read the Liang shu as evidence that goods were carried across the isthmus, because Chinese junks did not yet sail directly from the coast of Annam to the Straits. Luce thought an isthmian site fitted Fan-man's campaigns, which he read as a move to outflank Chin Lin. Hall also placed Tun Sun on the isthmus, on the upper east coast of the peninsula and at the terminus of the portage. Braddell concluded instead that the name was a generic one for the whole peninsula, with nothing to show whether its town lay in the north or the south. Han Wai Toon and H. G. Quaritch Wales placed it at the southern tip of the Malay Peninsula, at Johor Lama in Johor, Malaysia, where Han envisaged an entrepôt in which goods were stored between monsoons; their evidence was coarse stamped pottery found on the surface, which they dated to the early Christian era. Wheatley rejected the identification, noting that similar stamped designs were made in Perlis in the 1920s and that two expeditions to Johor Lama had found nothing to support the antiquity claimed.

Wheatley's own placement rests on the account of the monk Bodhibhadra's voyage in the Lo yang chia lan chi, which Braddell had not seen. There Tun Sun, written Sun-tien, lies some thirty days' sail from Funan and eleven days north of Kou-chih. Wheatley identified Kou-chih with Chü-li and with the Kole polis of Ptolemy, which he located on the estuary of the Kuantan River in Malaysia. Tun Sun then lay rather less than a quarter of the way from there to Funan, which in his view put it on the isthmus rather than on the peninsula proper.

Karen Mudar, citing Wheatley's study of 1983, reports the polities of Tun Sun taken by Funan as lying on the shores of the Bay of Bangkok and subordinate to it. O'Reilly suggests that it lay on the upper Malaysian peninsula, in an area dominated by the Mon people in that period. He places it possibly near Pong Tuk (พงตึก) in modern Kanchanaburi province or the Phra Pathom area of the old town of Nakhon Pathom in central Thailand. A Thai writer, Ruangyot Jantrakiri (เรืองยศ จันทรคีรี), has placed Tun Sun, founded in his account in 52 CE, at the present-day Na Tham sub-district (ตำบลหน้าถ้ำ), Yala province, in deep south Thailand. Briggs's study, however, located Chi Tu in that area.

== Politics and society ==
The political structure of Tun Sun is difficult to ascertain. It was partitioned among five monarchs, all of whom acknowledged themselves vassals of Funan, which Wheatley took to imply a form of political organization higher than that of a simple tribal society. Briggs, giving the same notice, queried whether the five were kings or kingdoms. Schlegel's translation of the same passage has the five reigning together, making them contemporaries rather than a succession. Hall, summarising the same notice, made the ruler of Tun Sun dominant among the five. The Fu-nan chi calls its king K'un-lun, a term Pelliot took to represent the Old Khmer kuruṅ, "king". Briggs thought the derivation apparently true but objected that it scarcely accounts for how often the king and people of the region are called K'un-lun. Braddell proposed that Takkola, an ancient emporium mentioned in the Geōgraphikē Hyphēgēsis of Ptolemy and in the Buddhist texts Mahāniddesa and Milinda Panha, dating to the 2nd–4th centuries CE, was one of its principalities.

It hosted more than a thousand Indian Brahmans and, in Wheatley's reading, possibly a colony of South Asian traders. The description comes from the Fu-nan chi of Chu Chih, which Wheatley dated to the 5th century and which survives in quotation in the T'ai p'ing yü lan. It records that the people of Tun Sun gave their daughters in marriage to the Brahmans, so that many did not leave. The Brahmans are described as studying the sacred canon, bathing with scents and flowers and practising piety by day and night. The same text counts five hundred families of hu (胡) from India (Note: The term hu usually denotes the Mongol and Tartar peoples of Central Asia; Wheatley accepted Pelliot's view that here it includes Indians in a broad sense, and that the distinction from the Brahmans may mark a merchant class.) and two fo-t'u (Note: Fo-t'u has not been satisfactorily explained. It may mean either the Buddha or a stupa. Pelliot suggests the expression might signify "a Buddhist".) in the country. Hall, following a later paper of Wheatley's, gave the same five hundred families as of Persian origin and probably western merchants. Briggs renders the second figure as "two [hundred?] Buddhists", with the query. Wheatley regarded this account as one of the earliest explicit descriptions of Indian cultural influence in Southeast Asia and the only contemporary notice of such intermarriage.

The people of Tun Sun exposed their dying to birds. A sick man vowed a bird burial and was escorted outside the town with songs and dances, where red, parrot-billed birds resembling geese devoured him; the bones were then burnt, put in an urn and sunk in the sea. A man whom the birds refused considered himself impure and threw himself into a fire, which the T'ung tien treats as an inferior course; one who did neither was held to be of bad character.

== Economy ==
Tun Sun is said to have controlled a branch of long-distance maritime trade between the Indian Ocean and the South China Sea. The Liang shu, compiled in the first half of the 7th century, describes it as a mart where east and west met, with more than 10,000 people a day, on the sea route between India and China. In Wheatley's translation, which follows an emendation of the text suggested by Arthur Waley, it lay "on an ocean stepping-stone", a place where one crossed from one sea to another. Its eastern frontier was said to communicate with Jiaozhou (交州) in Tonkin, and its western with India and Parthia. Briggs took the notice that vessels could not cross the open sea, and coasted instead, to make Tun Sun one of the earliest points of transshipment on the route.

The T'ung tien records more than ten kinds of flowers that did not wither in winter or summer, gathered at ten cartloads a day and dried into a powder for coating the body. The T'ai p'ing yü lan adds huo-hsiang, a plant used to perfume clothes, which Laufer identified as patchouli. Schlegel had earlier taken it for Betonica officinalis and the tu-liang named beside it for an incense and then a cotton plant, where Laufer read Eupatorium.

== Archaeological sites ==
- Khao Sam Kaeo (4th century BCE – 5th century CE)
- Kha Mao Yee, Kawthaung District, Myanmar
- Khu Bua (6th – 16th centuries CE)
- Ban Don Ta Phet (est. 6th century BCE)
- Mueang Kamphaeng Saen (7th – 11th centuries CE)
- Thung Setthi Stupa (8th – 10th centuries CE)
- Pong Tuk (est. 1st century CE)
- Old town Nakhon Pathom (est. 1st century CE)
  - Phra Pathommachedi
  - Phra Prathon Chedi
- Old town Ratchaburi (est. 4 century BCE)
