= Canasapura =

Ancient kingdom located in present-day Thailand

- c. 700–970
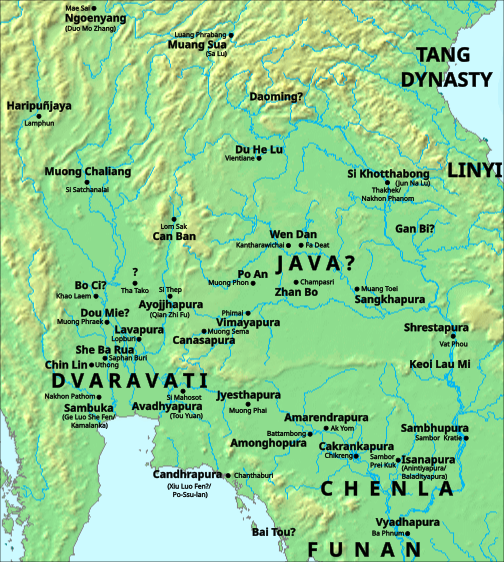
- Proposed locations of ancient kingdoms in Menam and Mekong Valleys in the 7th century based on the details provided in the Chinese leishu, Cefu Yuangui, and others.
- Capital: Muang Sema
- Religion: Buddhism, Hinduism
- Government: Monarchy
- Historical era: Post-classical
  - Established: c. 700
  - Disestablished: 970
Succeeded by
Khorakhapura; Dvaravati
- Today part of: Thailand

Canasapura or Canāśa, Śri Canāśa (Thai: จนาศปุระ, จานาศปุระ, ศรีจนาศะ, Chinese: 迦羅舍), possibly the Jiā Luó Shě Fú (迦逻舍佛, Kalasapura) of the Cefu Yuangui, (Note: The two proposed Chinese names are written differently: the form given here is 迦逻舍佛, while Hoshino's is 哥羅舍分, Ge Luo She Fen, which he treats as a second spelling of Jia Luo She Fu.) is an ancient kingdom of what is now Thailand, known from two inscriptions and, on one reading, from the Chinese annals as well. The two stones are the Bo Ika inscription (K. 400), found at Muang Sema in Nakhon Ratchasima Province, and the Śri Canāśa inscription, found at Phra Nakhon Si Ayutthaya and dated 937, which names four of its rulers.

Where the kingdom lay is not agreed. It is usually placed in the upper valley of the Mun River in present-day Isan, around Muang Sema. Tatsuo Hoshino instead identifies it with the Ge Luo She Fen of the Chinese records and reads those records as showing its core in the northern Chao Phraya plain and the Pasak valley after it lost the Nakhon Ratchasima area to Dvaravati. Peter Skilling cautions that the evidential base is unusually narrow, Canāśa being attested in the two inscriptions and in no literary source.

== Inscriptions ==
K. 400, the Bo Ika inscription, records a donation to a Buddhist community by a king of Canāśa. It is dated to about 790 CE in the database of the Princess Maha Chakri Sirindhorn Anthropology Centre, whereas George Cœdès, who published it, took it for a seventh-century text. Sarah Talbot also treats face A as a seventh-century text and face B as the dated record of 868. The passage has been rendered in English as:

Twenty female buffalos with pendant udders (lambastanyaḥ) and having baby calves, and fifty milch cows, heavy with the burden of their udders, followed by their well-nourished calves, ten female and male slaves, happy in their minds, and four elephants were given to the [Buddhist] community by the king of Canāśa, whose mind was fixed upon awakening.

Nicolas Revire gives the donor's title on this face as śrīcanāśeśvara, the glorious lord of Canāśa, and the gift as made in hope of bodhi. Face B of the same stone is dated 790 śaka (868 CE). It invokes Śiva as the supreme deity. It also records the puṇya, or meritorious work, of one Aṁśadeva, who installed a golden liṅga.

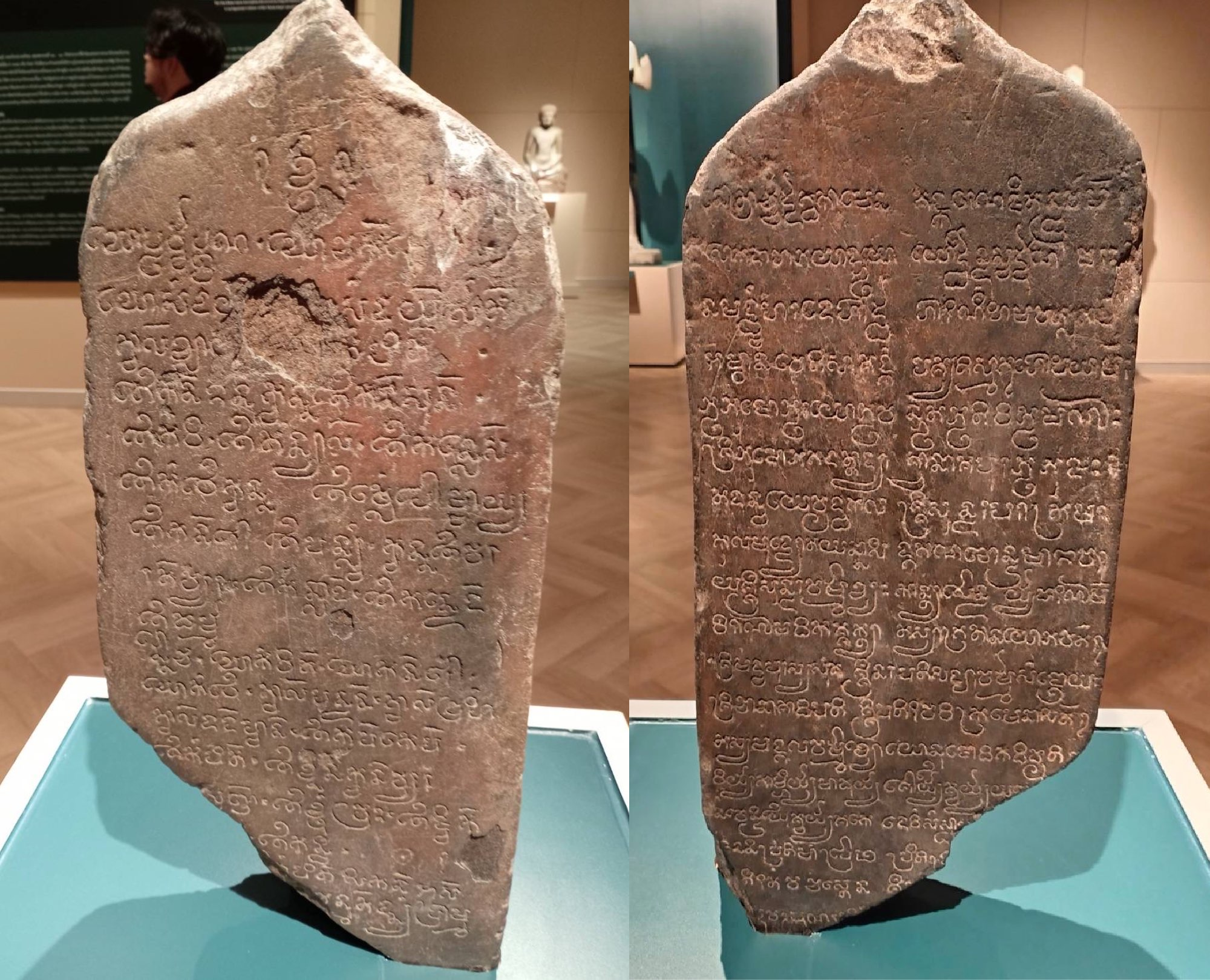
No. 117 Śri Canāśa inscription displayed at Bangkok National Museum

The Śri Canāśa inscription, in Sanskrit and Khmer, was found at Ayutthaya in 1939 and is dated 937. (Note: Skilling notes that old Khorat lay on the routes later taken by Ayutthayan armies marching to the plateau, so the stone may have been carried south at some later date rather than indicating any presence of Canasapura at Ayutthaya.) It names four rulers of Sri Canasa. The first is Bhagadatta (ภคทัตต์, Phakhathat), followed by Sri Sundaraprakrama (ศรีสุนทรปรากรม, Si Sunthraprakrom). His son was Sri Sundararavarman (ศรีสุนทรวรมัน, Si Sunthra Woraman), who had two sons. The elder, Narapatisimhavarman (นรปติสิงหวรมัน, Narapati Singha Woraman), came to the throne. The younger, Mangalavarman (มงคลวรมัน, Mongkhon Woraman), had the inscription made to mark the making of the image of the queen mother, the wife of Shiva, in 859 CE. Talbot gives the stone as naming five ancestral predecessors of Mangalavarman. Hoshino notes that it carries Khmer vocabulary, and that the last entry concerning the region in the New Book of Tang falls in 907. Baker and Pasuk record a Khmer-language inscription of 868 concerning Si Canasa that registers the erection of a Shiva-linga, and place Muang Sema with Si Thep and Si Mahosot among the settlements on the cultural border between the Chao Phraya plain and the plateau at which Angkorian-style temples were built, one of those at Muang Sema having been converted from Buddhist to Śaiva use.

== Identification and localization ==
Hoshino identifies Canāśapura with the polity the Chinese annals call Jia Luo She Fu and, in a second spelling, Ge Luo She Fen. He reads the final character as a rendering of the Sanskritic pūra, and points to the buri and bun of Phetburi, Chanthaburi, Phetchabun and Si Khottabun as its surviving forms. He offers Śrī Canāśapura as "a likely candidate" for the name behind it rather than as a settled identification. On his reading the state was inland and had neither a port nor access to the coast, and the two Chinese reports on it disagree, one placing it north of Dvaravati and the other giving it a common eastern border with Dvaravati. He explains the difference as a change over time rather than as an error: between the dates of the two reports Dvaravati expanded north-eastward and took the areas of Nakhon Ratchasima and Chaiyaphum, after which Canāśapura's territory receded to what he calls its original core in the northern half of the Chao Phraya plain and the Pa Sak valley. He further identifies it with Qian/Gan Zhi Fu, which he places at Si Thep, and cites Dhida Saraya's 1985 study in support of the equation.

Skilling describes the polity as a mystery that speculation cannot resolve, and has raised the possibility that the unnamed realm of the Wat Chanthuek inscription of about 550–650 CE, whose queen is described as a daughter of the Lord of Dvaravati, was Canāśa, while noting that this too cannot be determined on present evidence. Anurak Depimai states that Si Thep and Muang Sema became allied states of Dvaravati during the 7th century, citing shared town planning and material culture between the two sites, though without new epigraphic evidence specific to Canāśa itself. Robert Brown, whose reading Talbot follows, holds Muang Sema to be the most likely location of the polity, the dharmacakras from the site dating to the period of the Bo Ika inscriptions or slightly later.

Hoshino also treats the population as Tai-speaking. He presents this as an assumption from which a narrative follows rather than as a conclusion, writing "assuming that Śrī Canāśapura was already Tai-dominated in the eighth century". On that assumption its people would have sought access to the Gulf by the Bang Pakong River, been barred first by the Mon of Dvaravati and later by the Khmer, and moved west into the Pa Sak valley and the lands north of coastal Dvaravati. (Note: Hiram Woodward regards Hoshino's argument that the peoples of these polities spoke a Tai language as tendentious, and holds that it should be used neither to support nor to invalidate his geographical conclusions.) He credits the state with 20,000 warriors and groups it in the annals' single category with Xiū Luó Fēn and Gān Bì, all three fortified.

== History ==
The time of the establishment of Canāśa is unknown. It probably existed parallel to the Dvaravati culture of the Mon in what is now central Thailand, and the Khmer of its two inscriptions has been taken to place it on the periphery of the Dvaravati sphere, a network of city-states in the Chao Phraya plain. Both Hinduism and Buddhism were practised there.

Two Sanskrit inscriptions from the same district record religious activity there through the ninth and tenth centuries. K. 1155, found at Ban Phan Dung, opens with a salutation to Śiva. A certain Śrīvatsa installed images of Harihara and Viṣṇu there in 718 śaka (796 CE). This is the earliest mention of Harihara in the epigraphy of Thailand. The same stone later records a hermitage and an image of the Buddha, in 747 śaka (825 CE). K. 1141, the Muang Sema inscription of 892 śaka (970 CE), retells that sequence and carries it further. The Buddha image was replaced by a Devī, set up by the Brahmin Śrī Śikharasvāmī. The Devī was in turn replaced by a large Śiva-liṅga, raised by an unnamed king in 761 śaka (839 CE). Revire reads the pair as showing Hindu images installed both before and after a Buddha, with nothing to mark either as the superior. Revire adds that the Buddha image may have been needed to serve a Buddhist population frequenting the site. Julia Estève takes both stones to refer to one sacred site, named Damraṅ in the Khmer portion of K. 1141.

After the reign of Narapatisimhavarman, Canāśa disappears from the record. It may have been absorbed into the Khmer Empire under Jayavarman V, on the evidence of the Muang Sema inscription of about 970 CE, which names Driḍhabhakti Simhavarman (ทฤฒภักดี สิงหวรมัน, Thritthaphakdi Singha Woraman), taken to be Narapatisimhavarman under a new and reduced style. Revire, following Estève, describes the same man differently, as a provincial governor in the reign of Jayavarman V. On that reading he reconsecrated the royal liṅga and an image of the Buddha through the eye-opening ceremony. Talbot places a Hindu neighbour beside Muang Sema by the late tenth century, the city of Muang Khorakhapura near modern Nakhon Ratchasima, whose religious centres were the Khmer-style temples of Prasat Muang Khaek and Prasat Non Ku.

== Bibliography ==
- Goodall, Dominic; Revire, Nicolas (2023). "East and West - New Inscriptions from Funan, Zhenla and Dvāravatī". École française d’Extrême-Orient. p. 292. Archived from the original on 25 September 2023.
