= Gān Bì =

Ancient kingdom in northeastern Thailand and Laos

Gān Bì Kingdom
- 6th century – c. 665
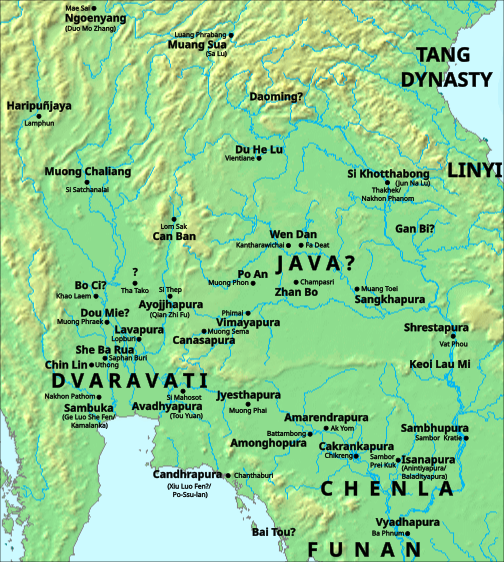
- Proposed locations of ancient polities in the Menam and Mekong Valleys in the 7th century based on the details provided in the Chinese leishu, Cefu Yuangui, and others.
- Religion: Buddhism
- Government: Kingdom
  - c. 665: Chandravarman
- Historical era: Post-classical era
- Today part of: Thailand; Laos

Gān Bì (Chinese: 甘毕) was a medieval polity recorded in the Chinese New Book of Tang and Cefu Yuangui in connection with Champa. (Note: The Chinese phrase has been read both as placing Gān Bì east of Champa and as placing Champa east of Gān Bì.) Its location is disputed, with proposals ranging from the Vietnamese coast to the middle Mekong and Tonlé Sap regions. Tatsuo Hoshino places it near present-day Savannakhet in the middle Mekong valley. The Chinese sources record a ruler named Zhan Tuo Yue Mo (旃陀越摩), usually Indianised as Chandravarman.

== Chinese sources ==
The New Book of Tang groups Gān Bì with two other polities and describes their customs as similar. It places Gān Bì in the Nan Hai, with Huanwang (環王), the Tang designation for Champa, to its east; it also records that the three polities sent tribute together. Gān Bì is said to have had 5,000 soldiers, compared with 20,000 attributed to each of the other two. The Indianised forms of the ruler's name are reconstructions from the Chinese sounds rather than attested spellings: Hoshino notes that the character yue (越) may be corrupt and may have been pronounced ba, which would yield Candabima, while reading the last two characters as the element varman yields Candravarman.

The geographical bearing has two competing readings. One places Gān Bì east of Champa, as in the Xu Tongzhi. The other reads the text as placing Huanwang east of Gān Bì, which would put Gān Bì west of Champa and therefore in the interior. Hoshino follows the latter reading and argues that Gān Bì's territory extended eastward to the territory of Huanwang.

The designation Nan Hai, literally "southern sea", has likewise been interpreted differently. Hoshino argues that it referred not to a maritime region but to the part of mainland Southeast Asia lying south of the Red River basin and Nanzhao, the French rendering of the term as "southern seas" being in his view mistaken; on that reading the passage can take in inland polities of the Mekong region.

== Location ==
Gān Bì has been located variously in the Vietnamese coastal region, the Tonlé Sap basin, and the middle Mekong valley. Hoshino initially proposed the Tonlé Sap basin or, alternatively, the area around Sakon Nakhon, and suggested that its ruler might have been the father of Jayavarman I of Chenla. In 2002, he revised the proposed location to the middle Mekong, north of Ju Lou Mi and near present-day Savannakhet.

The grouping of Gān Bì with the other two polities does not necessarily indicate geographical proximity. On Hoshino's reconstruction, the three lay widely separated, with Gān Bì near Savannakhet, Xiū Luó Fēn west of Chenla, and Śrī Canāśapura, which he identifies with Gē Luó Shě Fēn, in the Sak valley. He therefore reads their grouping as one of shared customs and military organisation rather than of proximity or alliance.

== People ==
Hoshino interprets Gān Bì and the other polities grouped with it as part of an inland political network in which Tai speakers may have played an important role. He regards the similarity in their customs, their fortified settlements, and their military organisation as supporting a Tai-dominated political environment. Hiram Woodward considers the linguistic argument tendentious, however, and argues that it should neither be used to support nor to invalidate Hoshino's geographical conclusions.
