= Xiu Luo Fen =

Ancient kingdom in central Thailand

Xiū Luó Fēn Kingdom
- Early to late 7 century
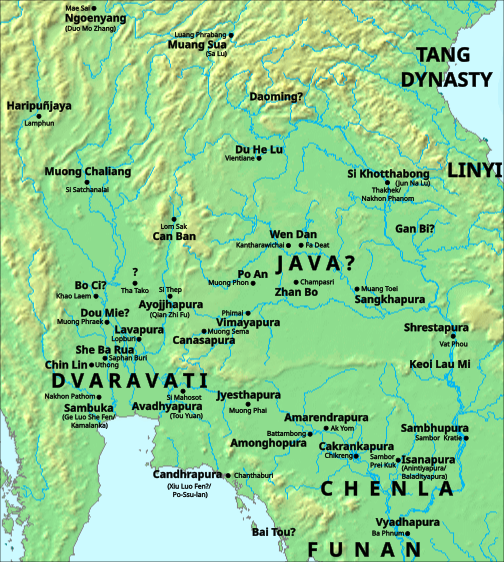
- Proposed locations of ancient polities in the Menam and Mekong Valleys in the 7th century based on the details provided in the Chinese leishu, Cefu Yuangui, and others.
- Religion: Buddhism
- Government: Kingdom
  - c. 665: Shīdámó Típó
- Historical era: Post-classical era
  - Fall of Funan: 627
  - Establishment: Early 7 century
  - Tribute sent to China: 665
- Today part of: Thailand

Xiū Luó Fēn (Chinese: 修羅分) was a polity of mainland Southeast Asia known from Chinese records of the 7th century, chiefly the New Book of Tang and the Cefu Yuangui. Where it lay has not been settled: the direction given in the annals and the identification Tatsuo Hoshino proposed in 1996 do not agree, and his later account in 2002 names no site for it.

The annals group Xiū Luó Fēn with Gē Luó Shě Fēn and Gān Bì as polities of similar customs and government, and record the three sending tribute to the Tang court together in 665. They name its ruler Shīdámó Típó and credit it with the largest army of the three, though the two Chinese texts differ over its size. Hoshino reads the grouping as one of shared customs and military organisation rather than of proximity.

== Chinese record ==
The Cefu Yuangui describes the town of Xiū Luó Fēn as enclosed by wooden palisades rather than masonry walls, and names its king as Shīdámó Típó (尸达摩提婆). The entry for the fifth month of 665 records a joint arrival, the three polities appearing together with missions from Yufo, Mola and Sanpu, and notes that the envoy of Gē Luó Shě Fēn had set out nine years earlier, in 656.

The strength given to Xiū Luó Fēn is 20,000 or more than 30,000 elite soldiers, the figure differing between the two Chinese texts. (Note: The Cefu Yuangui records that Xiū Luó Fēn possessed 30,000 elite troops, whereas the New Book of Tang reports a lower figure of 20,000 soldiers. Cefu Yuangui: 修罗分国，居于南海之北，以木栅为城，东至真腊国，南至海。其王名尸达摩提婆，精兵三万余人。 New Book of Tang: ...二國勝兵二萬，甘畢才五千。 The English rendering of the Cefu Yuangui entry published by Lin Ying and Huang Jiaxin gives 20,000 for Xiū Luó Fēn, agreeing with the New Book of Tang against the Chinese text quoted here.) Gē Luó Shě Fēn is credited with about 20,000 and Gān Bì with about 5,000, and all three are described as fortified and as each having a ruler of its own.

Hoshino reads the grouping of the three as one of shared customs and military organisation rather than of proximity, and takes that organisation as the mark of a Tai-dominated state; he also notes that the annals praise the fighting men of Xiū Luó Fēn and Śrī Canāśapura as excellent warriors. (Note: Hiram Woodward regards Hoshino's argument that the peoples of these polities spoke a Tai language as tendentious, and holds that it should be used neither to support nor to invalidate his geographical conclusions.)

== Location and name ==
The Cefu Yuangui places Xiū Luó Fēn north of the South Sea, with its territory reaching east to Zhenla and south to the sea. Tatsuo Hoshino proposed in 1996 that Xiū Luó Fēn was Isanapura, the capital of Zhenla. This identification appears inconsistent with the geographical bearing in the annals: a polity at the capital of Zhenla could not have Zhenla to its east. Hoshino does not address this discrepancy in his later discussion. In his 2002 chapter, he states only that Xiū Luó Fēn had Zhenla as an eastern neighbour, as Dvaravati did, and calls it a state west of Zhenla; he does not identify a specific site for it. (Note: The phrase "a state west of Zhen La" appears twice in the 2002 chapter, at pp. 54 and 55, in each case as a parenthesis identifying which polity is meant. The chapter contains no discussion of where Xiū Luó Fēn lay.)

The name has been read for further clues, though no full interpretation of Xiū Luó Fēn has been proposed. The final character fēn (分) is the same as the one that ends Gē Luó Shě Fēn, and Hoshino takes it for a Chinese rendering of the Sanskritic pūra, "town" or "city", pointing to the buri and bun of Phetburi, Chanthaburi, Phetchabun and Si Khottabun as the surviving forms. He reads the character luó (羅) as the dvara element of Dvaravati, although he does so of the Chinese renderings of Dvaravati itself rather than of this name.
