= Khu Bua =

Archaeological site near Ratchaburi, Thailand

- เมืองคูบัว (Thai)
- Ban Khu Bua; Mueang Khu Bua; Khu Bua Ancient Town
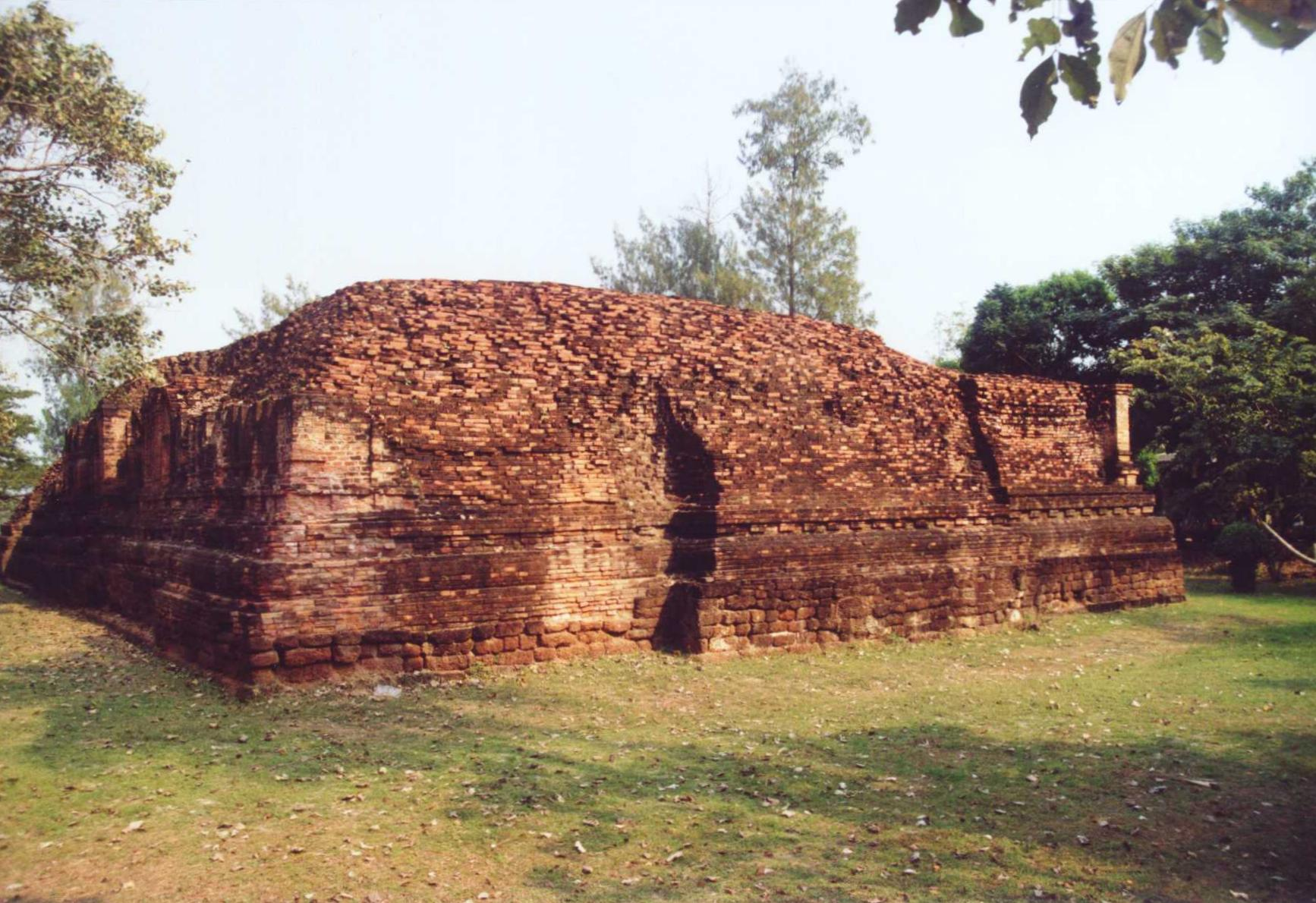
- Wat Khlong, the remains of a stupa dating back to the Dvaravati period
- Interactive map of Khu Bua
- Type: Human settlement
- Periods: Ancient history
- Cultures: Dvaravati
- Associated with: Mon people
- Location: Ratchaburi, Thailand

History
- Built: 6th century
- Abandoned: 16th century

Site notes
- Area: 1.6 square kilometres (160 ha)
- Excavation dates: 1957
- Condition: Partial restoration
- Owner: Public
- Management: Fine Arts Department, no entry fee
- Public access: Yes

Khu Bua (Thai: คูบัว, pronounced [kʰūː būa̯]) is an archaeological site located in the Khu Bua subdistrict, 12 km southeast of the city of Ratchaburi, Thailand. It dates from the 6th century Dvaravati culture and was one of the major cities of the kingdom.

Within the roughly rectangular site of around 800x2000 m surrounded by an earthen wall and a moat 44 archaeological sites were found within and outside the wall, with the foundations of Wat Khlong Suwankhiri being the largest and best preserved. Excavations were done in 1957, 1960, and 1961. The findings – ceramic figurines, wheels of law, and stone tablets – are now on display at the National Museum in Ratchaburi and Bangkok, as well as in the small museum next to Wat Khlong. The architectural and artistic features are those of the Indian Gupta Dynasty, which promoted Buddhism in the region after it was first introduced during the reign of Ashoka.

Evidence has been found to suggest that Buddhism has flourished in Thailand for over 1,000 years, with more than 60 traces of ancient sites, and most of them are places of worship related to Buddhism, both in the Theravada and Mahayana cults. The objects excavated in the Khu Bua city area include a sculpture of stucco and clay used to decorate buildings, such as Buddha images, Bodhisattva, angels, noble people, etc. There are also tools and various accessories that reflect the advanced technological developments of the time, and it can be assumed that the city of Khu Bua prospered in the Dvaravati period around the 11th-16th Buddhist centuries. Most of the artifacts found are currently preserved at the Ratchaburi National Museum. There has been a stucco image of a female musician discovered at the Khu Bua archaeological site that reflects the culture of those days.

Wat Khlong was registered as a historical site in 1962.

Stucco relief found at Khu Bua archaeological site. 650–700 C.E., Dvaravati culture. Three female musicians on right are playing (from center) a 5-stringed lute, cymbals, a tube zither or bar zither with gourd resonator.
The laterite stairs leading up to the temple base of the Wat Khlong Suwankhiri
