= Cefu Yuangui =

Song dynasty leishu

- Editor: Wang Qinruo, Yang Yi et al.
- Language: Classical Chinese
- Subject: mainly politics and history
- Publication date: 1013
- Publication place: Song dynasty

Cefu Yuangui
- Traditional Chinese: 冊府元龜
- Simplified Chinese: 册府元龟
- Literal meaning: Prime Tortoise of the Book Department
Transcriptions
Standard Mandarin
- Hanyu Pinyin: Cèfǔ Yuánguī
- Wade–Giles: tsʻê^{4}-fu^{3} yüan^{2}-kuei^{1}
Middle Chinese
- Middle Chinese: /t͡ʃʰˠɛk̚ pɨo^{X} ŋʉɐn kˠiuɪ/

Cefu Yuangui (冊府元龜) is the largest leishu (encyclopedia) compiled during the Chinese Song dynasty (AD 960–1279). It was the last of the Four Great Books of Song, the previous three having been published in the 10th century.

== History ==
The encyclopedia was commissioned by Emperor Zhenzong in October 1005 under the working title Records of Relations Between Rulers and Officials in Past Dynasties but was renamed Models from the Archives by the Emperor, to whom the finished work was presented on September 20, 1013. The final product was divided into 1,000 juan, 31 categories, and 1014 subcategories, all of which "related to administration of the empire, to bureaucracy, and to the imperial family." It did not include chapters on the natural world. Many people worked on the encyclopedia, including Wang Qinruo and Yang Yi who requested that the emperor hire more compilers. It was almost twice as large as the Imperial Reader of the Taiping Era and was ranked second in the Siku Quanshu collections.

== Name ==
English titles for this encyclopedia are:

- Prime Tortoise of the Record Bureau,
- The Magic Mirror in the Palace of Books,
- Archival Palace as the Great Oracle,
- General Preface on Outer Ministers,
- Outstanding Models from the Storehouse of Literature, and
- Models from the Archives.

== See also ==
- Chinese literature
- Chinese classic texts
- Culture of the Song dynasty
