= Leishu =

Sinosphere genre of reference work

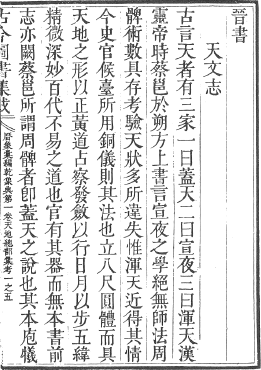
A page from the Complete Classics Collection of Ancient China, the largest leishu ever printed

The leishu (traditional Chinese: 類書; simplified Chinese: 类书; lit. 'category books') is a genre of reference books historically compiled in China and other East Asian countries. The term is generally translated as "encyclopedia", although the leishu are quite different from the modern notion of encyclopedia.

The leishu are composed of sometimes lengthy citations from other works, and often contain copies of entire works, not just excerpts. The works are classified by a systematic set of categories, which are further divided into subcategories. Leishu may be considered anthologies, but are encyclopedic in the sense that they may comprise the entire realm of knowledge at the time of compilation.

Approximately 600 leishu were compiled from the early third century until the eighteenth century, of which 200 have survived. The largest leishu ever compiled was the 1408 Yongle Encyclopedia, containing 370 million Chinese characters, and the largest ever printed was the Complete Classics Collection of Ancient China, containing 100 million characters and 852,408 pages.

== History ==
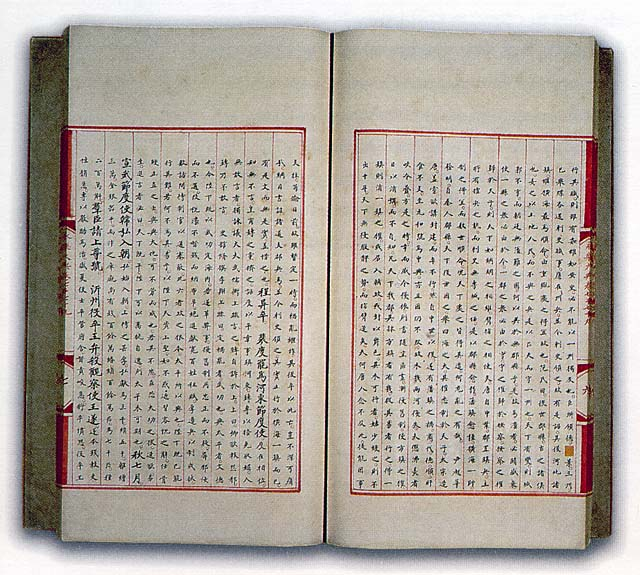
The Yongle Dadian, the largest leishu ever compiled

The genre first appeared in the early third century. The earliest known was the Huanglan ("Emperor's mirror" (Note: Compare the later "speculum literature" in the Western tradition.)). Sponsored by the emperor of Cao Wei, it was compiled around 220, but has since been lost. However, the term leishu was not used until the Song dynasty (960–1279).

In later imperial China dynasties, such as the Ming and Qing, emperors sponsored monumental projects to compile all known human knowledge into a single leishu, in which entire works, rather than excerpts, were copied and classified by category. The largest leishu ever compiled, on the order of the Yongle Emperor of Ming, was the Yongle Dadian containing a total of 370 million Chinese characters. The project involved 2,169 scholars, who worked for four years under general editor Yao Guangxiao. It was completed in 1408, but never printed, as the imperial treasury had run out of money.

The Complete Classics Collection of Ancient China (Qinding Gujin Tushu Jicheng) is by far the largest leishu ever printed, containing 100 million characters and 852,408 pages. It was compiled by a team of scholars led by Chen Menglei, and printed between 1726 and 1728, during the Qing dynasty.

The riyong leishu (encyclopedias for daily use), containing practical information for people who were literate but below the Confucian elite, were also compiled in the later imperial era. Today, they provide scholars with valuable information on non-elite culture and attitudes.

According to Jean-Pierre Diény, the Jiaqing reign (1796–1820) of the Qing dynasty saw the end of the publication of leishu.

== In other countries ==
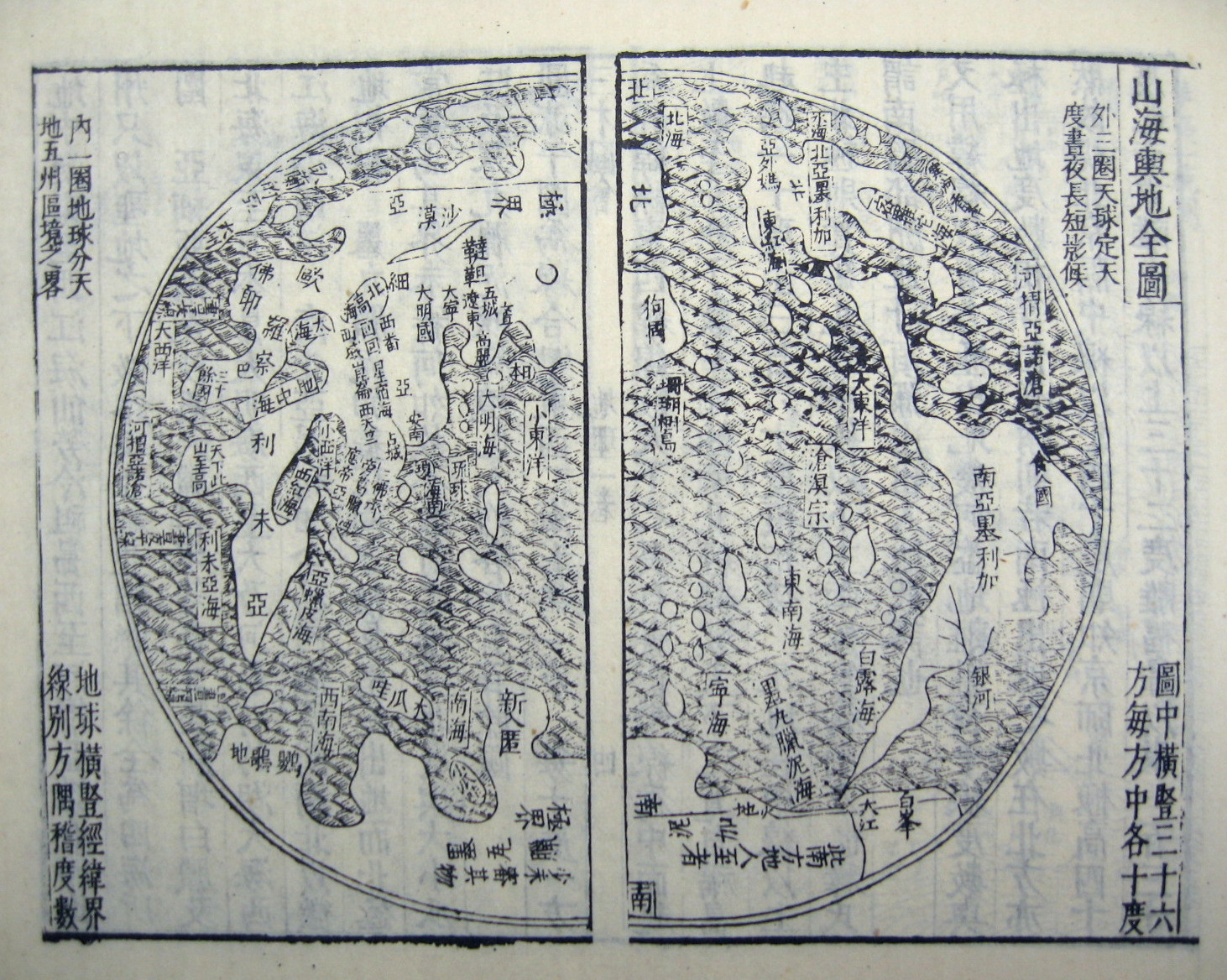
The world map entitled Shanhai Yudi Quantu, from the Sancai Tuhui, an illustrated leishu

Other countries in the Sinosphere also adopted the genre of leishu. In 1712, the Sancai Tuhui, a richly illustrated leishu compiled by Ming scholar Wang Qi (王圻) in the early 17th century, was printed in Japan as Wakan Sansai Zue. The Japanese version was edited by Terajima Ryōan (寺島良安), a physician born in Osaka.

== Importance ==
The leishu have played an important role in the preservation of ancient works, many of which have been lost, only preserved completely or partially as part of a leishu compilation. The 7th-century Yiwen Leiju is especially valuable. It contains excerpts from 1,400 pre-7th century works, 90% of which have been otherwise lost. Even though the Yongle Dadian is itself largely lost, the remnants still contain 385 complete books that have been otherwise lost. The leishu also provide a unique view of the transmission of knowledge and education, and an easy way to locate traditional materials on any given subject.

== Major compilations ==
Approximately 600 leishu were compiled, from the Cao Wei period (early third century) until the 18th century, of which 200 have survived. Among the most important, in chronological order, are:

- Yiwen Leiju (Collection of literature arranged by categories), compiled by Ouyang Xun
- Beitang Shuchao (北堂书钞, Excerpts from books in the Northern Hall), compiled by Yu Shinan ca. 630
- Chuxue Ji (初學記, Writings for elementary instruction), compiled by Xu Jian et al. between 713 and 742
- Taiping Yulan (Taiping Imperial Reader), compiled by Li Fang et al., published 984
- Cefu Yuangui (Outstanding models from the storehouse of literature), compiled by Wang Qinruo et al., completed in 1013
- Yuhai (玉海, Ocean of jade), compiled by Wang Yinglin 1330–40
- Yongle Dadian, completed 1408, the largest leishu ever compiled
- Complete Classics Collection of Ancient China, 1726–28, the largest leishu ever printed
