= Zhān Bó =

Ancient kingdom in northeastern Thailand

Zhān Bó Kingdom
- Early 7th– 9th century
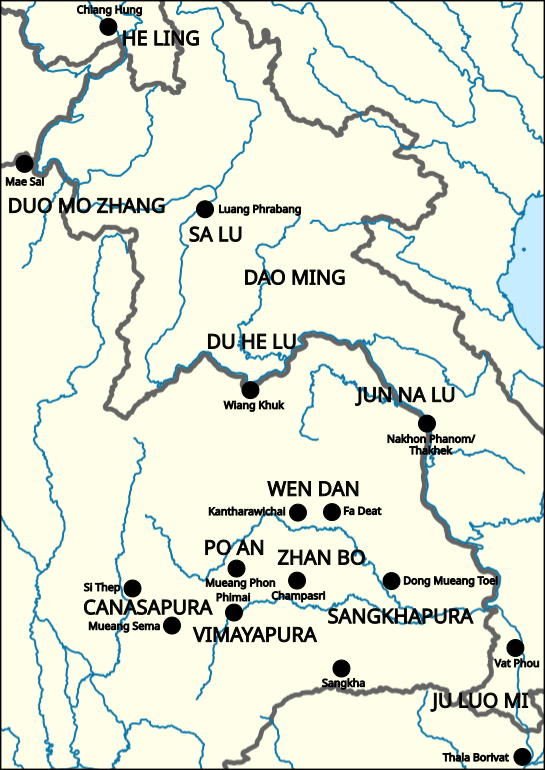
- Proposed location of polities in the middle Mekong region in the 7th century CE.
- Capital: Champasri; Mueang Bua
- Government: Kingdom
- Historical era: Post-classical era
  - Split from Chenla: 650s
  - First tribute to China: 657 CE
  - Region entered the Java era: 9th century
Preceded by	Succeeded by
Zhū Jiāng	Yamanadvipa
- Today part of: Thailand

Zhān Bó (Chinese: 瞻博), also known as Dzim Bohk in Cantonese and conventionally described as the Inland Champa, was a polity recorded in the New Book of Tang among the states of the Southwest Sea (西南海). Its location remains uncertain. Paul Pelliot held that the passage describing it had been placed wrongly and belonged in the annals' section on India rather than among the accounts of mainland Southeast Asia, while Tatsuo Hoshino keeps it where it stands and places the polity in the middle Mekong basin, more precisely in central Isan, with Champasri as its political centre.

In 657, Zhān Bó participated in a joint tribute mission to the Tang court with four other polities, bringing elephants and rhinoceroses. Hoshino reads the mission as evidence of an inland confederation of five states with Zhān Bó at its head, Qiān Zhī Fú among them, distinct from the coastal territories that depended on maritime trade.

The identity of Zhān Bó's population is likewise uncertain. Hoshino associates it with the Cham people, though he allows that its inhabitants may have belonged to a different branch of the Cham or may not have been Cham at all, and he argues separately for a Tai-speaking presence in the same region.

== Identification and localization ==
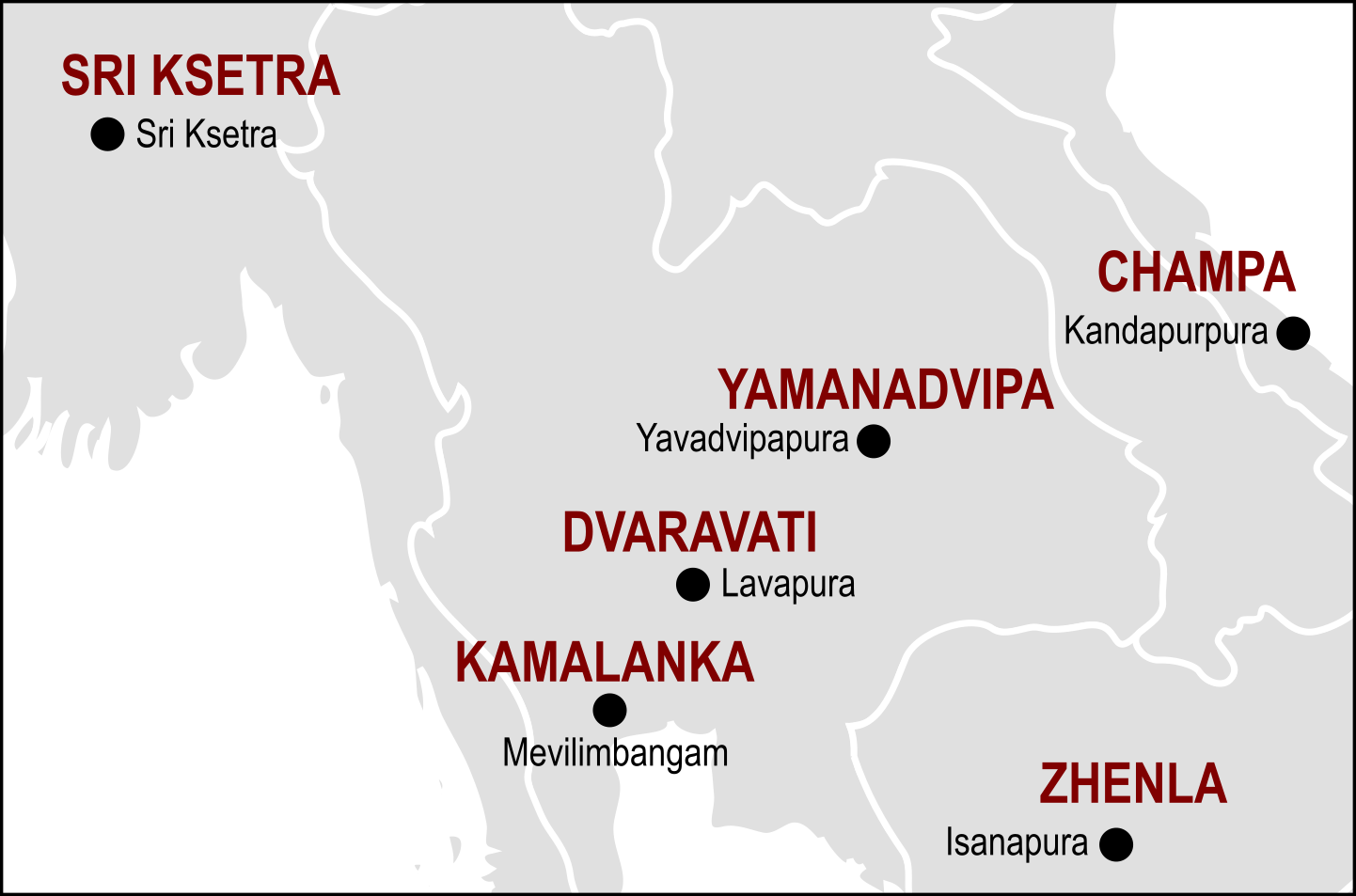
Location of Yamanadvipa, which matches that of Zhān Bó

The New Book of Tang gives the polity two spellings, Zhān Bó and Zhān Pó, places it south of a river called the Jiang Jiahe, which the Chinese text identifies with the Ganges, and notes the abundance of wild elephants there. Pelliot found the sentences difficult to place. They stand in the annals between the account of Tou He and those of Gē Luó Shě Fēn, Xiū Luó Fēn and Gān Bì, and he took their position for an editorial mistake, holding that they belonged in the section on India instead. Hoshino keeps the passage where the annals place it. The description, he argues, does not fit the geography of India, and the name need not denote the Indian river: peoples along the Mekong had received Indian legend through Hindu and Buddhist practice for centuries, and Lao literature, the Lao version of the Ramayana among it, compares the Mekong with the Ganges. On this basis, he considers it possible that "Ganges" was used for the Mekong during the Tang period, although he presents the interpretation as possible rather than demonstrated. (Note: Hoshino sets out his own limits on the argument in the same chapter: "Nothing is absolutely certain in the reconstruction of ancient history. The opinion expressed here could be rejected, since it is not founded on sure evidence." He also describes the three site identifications in this group as tentative and consistent with the textual evidence rather than established by it.)

Within mainland Southeast Asia, Hoshino considers two possible zones for the polity's centre. One lies on the plain along the Mekong from Loei to Nakhon Phanom, an area associated with the much earlier Ban Chiang culture; the other lies further south, across the Phu Phan range in what is now central Isan. He favours the latter and identifies Champasri, a large circular moated Dvaravati settlement in Na Dun subdistrict, Maha Sarakham province, as the polity's capital. He also suggests that the modern name Champasri preserves the ancient name Champa. The statement that Zhān Bó "extended towards the north for some distance up to the Ganges" is, in his reading, compatible with a location inland from the Mekong rather than directly on the river itself.

The name Zhān Bó itself has several possible explanations. Hoshino suggests that it may have been carried by migrants, with the Chinese applying the original Cham name to a new settlement and subsequently assigning another name to the older territory in central Vietnam. Alternatively, he proposes that the name may reflect a perceived resemblance between the great southward bends of the Mekong and Ganges, noting that the original Champa in ancient India lay south-west of the Ganges bend. A third possibility, which Hoshino attributes to researchers at the Cham research centre at Phan Rang, is that the name derives from the plumeria flower, in which case it need not represent an Indianised toponym. Hoshino does not adopt any of these explanations as definitive.

The later Angkorian term Java has also been reinterpreted by Michael Vickery as referring to "the Chams." On this basis, the kingdom of Yamanadvipa or Yavanadvipa, mentioned in the account of Xuanzang's journey in the 7th century and placed west of Mo-ho-chan-po (Mahacampa), identified with Lin-i, has been proposed as the same inland Cham polity.

== History ==
The Chinese record initially distinguishes Zhān and Bó as separate names before subsequently treating them as a single polity. The Cefu Yuangui states that in 657 "Zhān guo Bó guo", that is, "the country of Zhān and the country of Bó", sent tribute, with each name followed by guo (國), "state". Hoshino interprets this as evidence for two administrative centres rather than a textual or scribal error, and regards it as an early example in the region of the dual-centre political arrangements attested in later kingdoms. He interprets their subsequent appearance as a single polity as evidence of a group of royal settlements under one ruling family, and suggests that the mission of 657 represented a polity whose two chiefs were connected by a family relationship. The envoys presented elephants and rhinoceroses at the Tang court.

Zhān Bó also appears in the same volume of the annals among the seventeen tributary states of Piao, earlier called Zhū Bō (朱波) and identified with the Pyu city-states of present-day Myanmar. Hoshino reads this as placing the polity between two major powers and obliging it to send tribute to both. It is listed beside Du Po, with the two names appearing consecutively at the end of the list. Hoshino interprets this arrangement as indicating that they were contiguous and that their relations with Piao were relatively distant, with intervening mountain ranges making tribute missions irregular. A Chinese Buddhist monk, Chéng Wù (乗悟), is recorded to have died in Zhān Bó while returning to Jiaozhou (交州) after residing in He Ling (訶陵) and other places further south.

Following the decline of Dvaravati, Zhān Bó and other principalities in the Mun–Chi basins may have formed alliances with Angkor. Hoshino regards the material at Champasri as compatible with such a connection, noting that the site appears more Khmer or Angkorian than Mon or Dvaravati in character, while allowing that part of its moat may belong to the Dvaravati period. In Woodward's reconstruction, the connection between these polities and the former trans-Mekong confederates of the Menam basin, including Qiān Zhī Fú at Si Thep, ended during the same period.

A Sanskrit inscription from Baphuon dated 790 records that Indrayudha, whose father is identified as the Khmer king Jayavarman II, captured a "king of Champa" while still a young man. The identity of this Champa remains uncertain. Hoshino leaves open three possibilities: the coastal Huan Wang of central Vietnam, Keoi Lau Mì in southern Laos, and Zhān Bó in Isan, and concludes that the available evidence does not permit a firm identification. (Note: The date creates a chronological difficulty that the source does not address. Jayavarman II's accession is conventionally placed in 802, twelve years after the inscription, making the reported filiation difficult to reconcile with the conventional chronology.)

== People ==
Hoshino associates Zhān Bó with the Cham people, noting that the Chinese used Zhān Pó (瞻婆) for Champa and related polities in the 7th and 8th centuries. In Cantonese, Zhān Bó 瞻博 is pronounced Zim^{1} Bok^{3}, while the character Zhān 瞻 was ordinarily used in Chinese references to Champa. On this basis, Hoshino, following Paul Pelliot, refers to Zhān Bó as an inland Champa. He nevertheless qualifies the identification, stating that its inhabitants were "apparently either a different branch of Cham or perhaps not ethnically Cham at all". Keoi Lau Mì, also known as South Línyì and placed in the area where the borders of present-day Thailand, Laos and Cambodia meet, is likewise associated by Hoshino with strong Cham connections. The same polity has separately been associated with the Kuy people.

Hoshino sets this possible Cham connection alongside his argument for a Tai-speaking presence in the same region. He proposes that Tai speakers attested in northern Champa, in present-day Nghệ An and Thanh Hóa and the Northwest of Vietnam, began moving into the central Mekong valleys during the 5th and 6th centuries. Following Haudricourt, he takes the 3rd century as the earliest possible date for a westward movement of tonal Tai from Chinese-controlled Vietnam, and proposes that these populations subsequently spread across Isan and into the Chao Phraya basin. He treats the dual-capital formulation "Zhān guo Bó guo" as one of the indications for such a presence, comparing it with paired centres in later Tai polities, including Sukhothai and Si Satchanalai, Xieng Dong and Xieng Thong, Wiang Chieng Mai and Wiang Kum Kam, and Ayodhya and Lopburi, as well as the inner and outer capitals that he assigns to Wen Dan at Kantharawichai and Fa Daet Song Yang. (Note: Hiram Woodward, who accepts Hoshino's placing of Wen Dan's two capitals, regards the argument that the peoples of these polities spoke a Tai language as tendentious, and holds that it should be used neither to support nor to invalidate the geographical conclusions.) Hoshino also identifies Tai speakers in the Wen Yang district (文陽) of the Tang prefecture of Changzhou (長州 or 裳州), which he locates on the Mekong near Thakhek, opposite Nakhon Phanom, while treating Sakhon Nakhon as an alternative location for the prefectural seat.
