= Non Mueang ancient city =

Coordinates: 16°30′51″N 102°05′51.1″E

Non Mueang Ancient Town
- เมืองโบราณบ้านคูเมือง (Thai)
- Interactive map of Non Mueang Ancient Town
- Type: Human settlement
- Periods: Pre-history
- Cultures: Dvaravati; Rattanakosin
- Associated with: Mon people; Lao people; Thai people
- Location: Chum Phae, Khon Kaen, Thailand

History
- Built: c. 8th century BCE
- Abandoned: c. 12th century CE

Site notes
- Material: Brick, Laterite, Sandstone, Ceramics
- Area: 0.38 square kilometres (38 ha)
- Excavation dates: 1982
- Archaeologists: Fine Arts Department
- Discovered: 1970
- Condition: Mostly destroyed
- Owner: Private
- Public access: Yes

Mueang Boran Non Mueang or Non Mueang Ancient Town (Thai: เมืองโบราณโนนเมือง) was a moated ancient settlement in Chum Phae, Khon Kaen, northeastern Thailand. It was first inhabited around the 8th century BCE and evolved into a complex society in the 7th century during the Dvaravati period, then was abandoned around the 12th century.

Non Mueang was a supra-regional center of the Dvaravati civilization, together with Si Thep, Champasri, Mueang Fa Daet Song Yang, Dong Mueang Aem, and others, but little known about its political structure. It could have previously been the center of an ancient kingdom.

Non Mueang has been listed as an ancient site of Khon Kaen Province since it was discovered in 1970.

== Layout and location ==
Mueang Boran Non Mueang is located in the Chum Phae subdistrict in Khon Kaen province of Thailand. The inner city is an oval-shaped mound covering an area of approximately 27 hectares, surrounded by a 15–40-meter wide moat, whereas the outer city has a 650-meter diameter defined by a 40-meter width moat. However, only the southeast side of the outer moat survives; the rest has been filled in and destroyed, but the furrows remain visible from overhead views.

The mound is approximately five meters above the surrounding agricultural fields. The presence of a large moat indicates that the city was the center of smaller communities in the area.

== Findings ==
Archaeological surveys and excavations performed in 1970, 1982–83, and 1991–92 found the site was inhabited since the prehistory era; 17 human skeletons dated 2,500 years were burial with tools, and utensils, such as pots and pottery containers with both painted and scratched designs and rope-marked designs, as well as bronze bracelets, animal bone bracelets, shells, colored stone beads, etc. Some Dvaravati's sandstone Bai Semas were found in the inner city. Small pieces of pottery are scattered across the mound. These pottery pieces were either red painted, scratched, or rope-patterned in the soil layers of the Dvaravati period (7th-10th centuries). No evidence of burial was found in this layer.

The site was continuously occupied during the Lopburi period and was abandoned after the 12th century.
