= Wen Dan =

6th–9th century political entities

Wen Dan (文單)
- 580–9th century
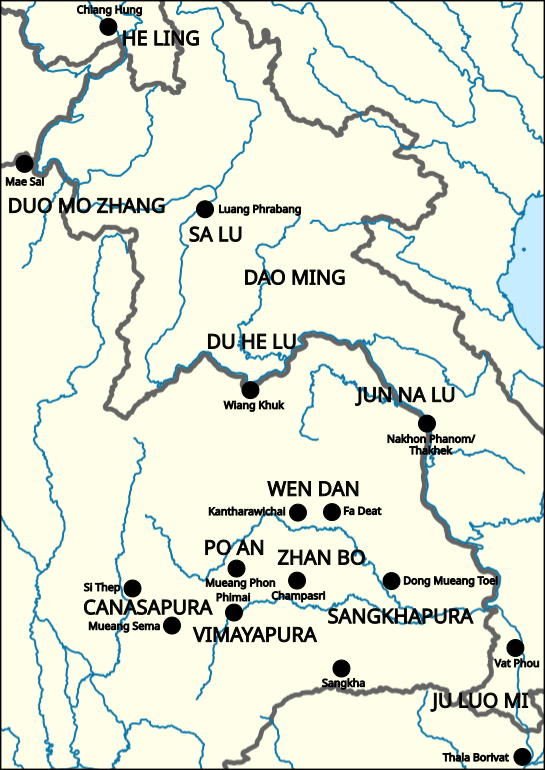
- Proposed location of polities in the middle Mekong region in the 7th century CE.
- Capital: Kantharawichai; Fa Daet Song Yang
- Religion: Buddhism
- Monarch
  - c. 771: Po Mi
  - c. 785: Lin Jong
  - c. 800s: Lin Thong
- Historical era: Post-classical
  - Established: 580
  - Broke away from Chenla: 681 (Note: The date of the separation is given variously: about 681 by Coēdès, 707 by Dupont, and 705–707 by Hoshino, who treats the separate tribute of 717 as the point at which it is first documented.)
  - First tribute to China: 717 (Note: Hoshino places a first mission in the Xian Qing reign, 656–661, and treats the embassy of 717 as the second.)
  - Allied with Tai–Hmong: 722
  - Last tribute to China: 799
  - Disestablished: 9th century
Preceded by
Chenla
Dvaravati
Succeeded by
Kuruntha
Yamanadvipa
Angkor

Wén Dān (Chinese: 文單; Thai: เหวินตัน) was a polity, or group of polities, of the interior of mainland Southeast Asia between the 6th and 9th centuries, known almost entirely from Chinese records of the Tang period. Tatsuo Hoshino places it in the central Mekong valley of what is now northeast Thailand, with its inner capital at Kantharawichai and its outer capital at Mueang Fa Daet Song Yang. He identifies its people as Tai-speaking, a characterisation Hiram Woodward regards as tendentious while accepting the placement. It has also been equated with Mūladeśa, attested in the K.187 inscription, and with Bhavapura.

Wen Dan sent embassies to the Tang court in 717, 750, 753, 771, 779 and 799, and its envoys received Chinese titles; a contingent from it fought alongside Tang forces against Nanzhao in the 750s. (Note: Woodward gives 798 rather than 799 for the last embassy, and lists 717, 753 and 771 for the others. Hoshino gives 798 for the last mission and names its envoy.) China administered a prefecture of its own on the middle Mekong, Changzhou, which passed under Huanzhou in 791; the last Wen Dan embassy followed seven years later.

The polity disappears from the record after the early 9th century. Woodward reads its end as defeat by Jayavarman II, or alternatively as an alliance with him against Si Thep, while Hoshino holds that the region then entered a phase he calls Java.

== Location and extent ==
The Chinese annals and the archaeological evidence place Wen Dan in the Chi River basin, centered in Kantharawichai, which the Chinese called Pó Lòu (婆鏤), with Mueang Fa Daet Song Yang as the outer centre and Champasri as a subordinate town. (Note: Hoshino himself draws a different conclusion from the same pair of identifications. Having placed Wen Dan's two capitals at Kantharawichai and Fa Daet, he writes that Zhān Bó "must therefore have been at the site of Nakhòn Champa Sri", taking the modern name to preserve the ancient Champa. That is, he treats Champasri as the seat of a separate polity rather than as a dependency of Wen Dan, and names Dao Ming and Cān Bàn as Wen Dan's two vassals. He also notes that Nakhòn Champa Sri is more Khmer or Angkorian than Mon in character, although part of the moat may belong to the Dvaravati period.) Hoshino presents the three identifications as tentative and consistent with the Chinese texts rather than as established. The three are held to have been linked by Dvaravati Buddhism, displaced by Angkorian practice in the 10th century. Several lines of evidence connect Wen Dan with Si Thep in central Thailand. The Kantharawichai placement fits the Tang Huiyao, which puts Wen Dan six days' land travel north-west of Keoi Lau Mì of the Kuy people.

Wen Dan had two vassals, Dàomíng to the north in modern Laos and Cān Bàn to the northwest. Cān Bàn had sent tribute alongside a still united Chenla in 625 and 628 before coming under Wen Dan. Hoshino calls Cān Bàn's seat the weakest part of his reconstruction. He favours Si Thep, although it lies southwest of Mueang Fa Daet Song Yang, whereas the annals place Cān Bàn to the northwest. He therefore places its administrative centre farther up the Pasak River valley, and for the 9th and 10th centuries proposes Suphan Buri, based on a notice placing Cān Bàn more than 1,000 li southwest of Land Chenla on swampy ground near the sea. The New Book of Tang names Cān Bàn (參半) as a dependency lying to the north-west of Wen Dan and records an embassy from it to the Tang court. A further constraint comes from the wars on Chenla's eastern frontier. Hoshino takes the Ai Lao pass to have been the attack route between Chenla and Huan Wang, and reasons that a polity reached that way could not have lain in southern Laos or the southern part of Isan. Some academics equate Wen Dan with Bhavapura, centered at Vat Phou in modern southern Laos, which conflicts with the location of Wen Dan given in the Chinese sources. David Welch, following Cœdès's derivation of the name from the Sanskrit mula, gives its earlier pronunciation as Muen-tan and infers that Wen Dan may have lain in the Mun basin, most likely along the lower river.

Woodward accepts Hoshino's placement of the two centres but considers the evidence for the northeastern region less certain. He notes that the boundary stones of Mueang Fa Daet Song Yang cannot by themselves establish the presence of an urban centre there in the 8th century. Rungrot Phiromanukun dates the earliest groups of ritual boundary stones generally to about 600–750, while Jean Boisselier placed those at Fa Daet in about the 9th century and Piriya Krairiksh dated several of the site's figural stones to the 10th. Sakchai Saising dates the northeastern sema corpus as a whole to the ninth and tenth centuries, from the post-Pallava script and Old Mon language of the inscribed examples. Instead, Woodward bases the 8th-century evidence on two other sites. The first is a cache of small silver repoussé sheets from Kantharawichai, bearing designs of stupas and kumbha stupas, which Santi Leksukhum dates to the 8th–9th century. The second is about 1,000 votive tablets excavated in 1979 from a ruined stupa at Na Dun. The latter were published as 9th–10th century but are considered by Woodward to be earlier, dating to about the 8th century.

== Relations with Tang China ==
The first tribute recorded in the annals is usually dated to 717, although Hoshino identifies an earlier mission during the Xian Qing reign (656–661) as the first. Hoshino reads the Chinese notice of the five polities that sent tribute together in 657 as a group federated politically and economically, and culturally distinct from the coastal region Dvaravati dominated. In 722, Wen Dan is said to have assisted a native lord from Nghe An, probably a Tai or Hmong, in a war against the Chinese governor of Jiaozhou. The Chinese forces were defeated, and the local ruler took the title Hei-ti (lit. 'Black Emperor'). Hoshino ties the movement of Tai-speaking groups into the middle Mekong to no single event of this kind.

Wen Dan sent another tribute mission to China in 750. In 753, its crown prince and 26 relatives or officials were received at the Chinese court and granted titles in recognition of Wen Dan's assistance on the southeastern frontier. Hoshino identifies the delegation with a Wen Dan contingent that took part in the Tang campaign against Nanzhao. He dates its participation to 751–754, with the delegation received at the Chinese court in 753 and returning home in 755. He describes this as the only known case in which Southeast Asian troops joined a Chinese army in the field during the Tang period.

Due to several unsuccessful wars against Nanzhao, to strengthen the southern region, Jiaozhou was placed under a military commandant in 756. Ten years later, in 766, a Tang army of 70,000, led by General Li Mi from Sichuan, invaded Nanzhao. Kolofeng, the Nanzhao king, captured General Li and won, and the following year the citadel of Lo-than near the modern Hanoi was constructed after the region was raided by Melayu. In 771 an embassy led by Po Mi (婆彌) reached the Tang court with eleven trained elephants and a party of twenty-five, and was entertained in the imperial palace on 13 December of that year. Po Mi received a Chinese personal name and the title kaifu yitongsansi, which Hoshino ranks second of the thirty tiers of the Tang bureaucracy, above the governors of Jiaozhou and Guangzhou and equal in standing to the title conferred on the pro-Chinese Nanzhao king Pi Luo Ge in about 735; how Po Mi came by it Hoshino leaves open. (Note: The two Chinese sources disagree about Po Mi's position. The New Book of Tang calls him the heir apparent, while the Cefu Yuangui calls him wang, king, of Wen Dan.) He travelled with his wife, which Hoshino describes as the only recorded instance of a consort accompanying a tribute mission to the Tang court. Another embassy is said to have been sent in 779, and the last in 798 or 799, its envoy recorded in Chinese style as Lītóují (李頭及) and given the title zhong lang jiang, which by this date denoted an army commander or a regional chief entitled to a residence of his own.

The route to the Wen Dan capitals is described in the geographical chapters of the New Book of Tang and in the Taiping Huanyu Ji, drawing on a Tang geography now lost. Reconstructing it, Hoshino has a traveller leave Huanzhou, which he places at Vinh rather than Hà Tĩnh on the precision of the opening bearing, go three days south-west over a mountain the Chinese called Wu Wen and two more to a place called Ri Luo, reaching a Tai town on the right bank of the Mekong near present-day Nakhon Phanom in about eight days by way of the Nam Theun, the Nam Hinbun and the Nam Hai. From the landing of Man Yang the journey continued south-west for four days, three across the plain below Nong Han Luang and one over the Phu Phan range, to a district the Chinese called Suan Tai, then by river to Khao Wong north of Kuchinarai, three days more to Fa Daet and one further day to Kantharawichai. He notes that elephants could not be carried in river boats, so an outbound tribute mission took longer than the itinerary as recorded.

Tang China also administered a prefecture on the Mekong itself, Changzhou (長州 or 裳州), with two districts. Hoshino places its seat either on the Mekong near Thakhek and Nakhon Phanom or at Sakon Nakhon, and places Tai speakers in numbers in its Wén Yáng district (文陽), which he locates at Thakhek.

== History ==
=== Dvaravati–Chenla period: 580s – 800s ===
==== Federated Chenla: 580s – 681 ====
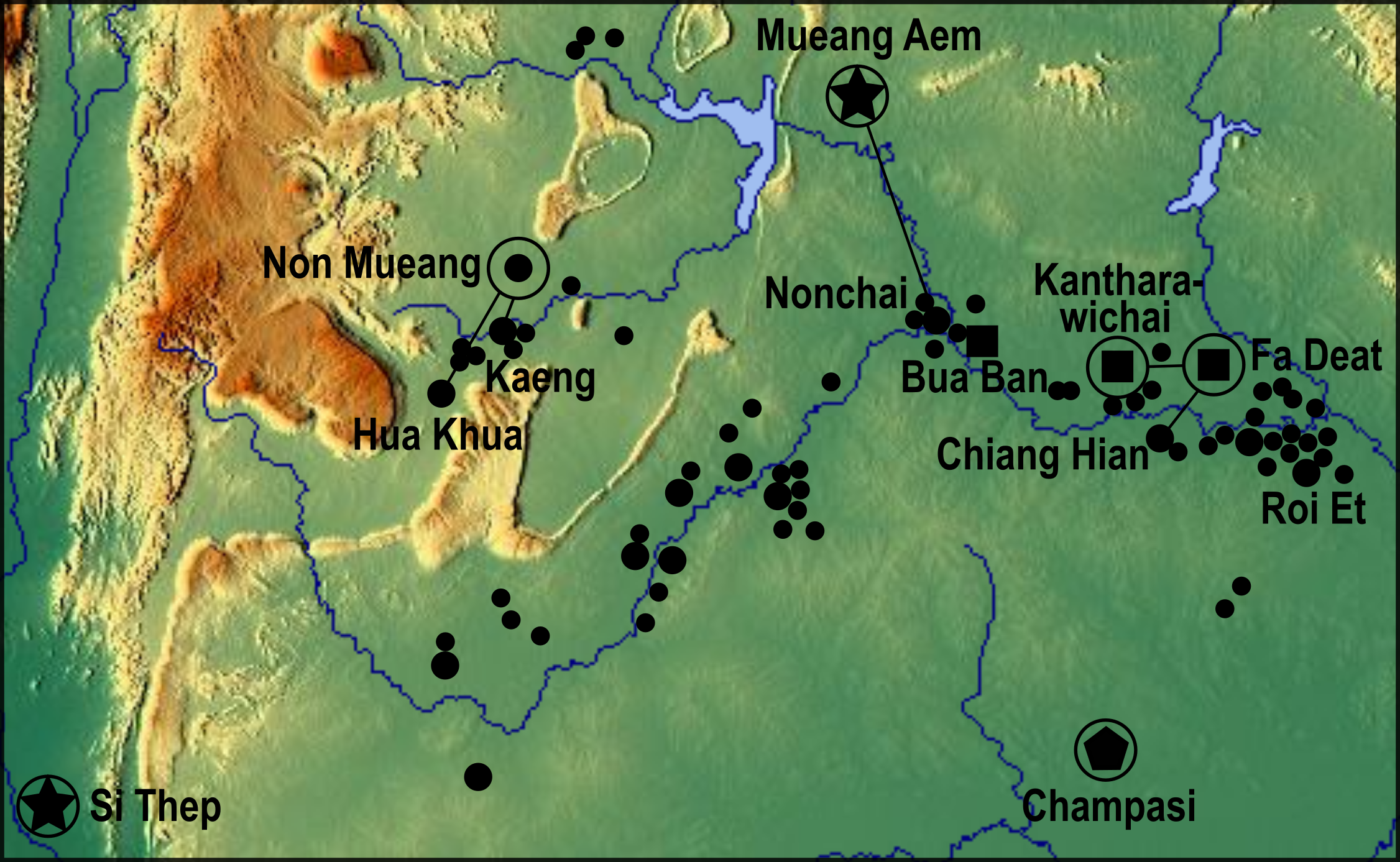
Distribution of early historic polities and 7th-century moated settlement clusters in the Chi and Mun River basins of northeastern Thailand

Where Chenla first formed bears directly on the interpretation of Wen Dan. Pierre Dupont placed its origin in the Mun valley under Bhavavarman I, who, together with his successor Mahendravarman I, expanded southward to the Bassac and Pakse region, later known as Sreshthapura, and along the Mekong; the kingdom reached its height under Isanavarman I before breaking apart in the 8th century. On this reconstruction, Wen Dan would have represented the dynasty's northern homeland rather than a peripheral secession. Dupont therefore named the resulting polity Bhavapura after Bhavavarman.

That reconstruction has been questioned by the distribution of the inscriptions themselves. Khmer inscriptions earlier than the 7th century cluster in central and southern Cambodia and the Mekong delta, while northeastern Thailand has no known Khmer inscription before the 8th century. Southern Laos and northwestern Cambodia, which have at times been proposed as the Khmer homeland, instead contain Cham inscriptions. The Văt Luong Kău stele (K.365) from Vat Phou, dated to the late 5th century, names a mahārājādhirāja Śrī Devanika, who is said to have come from a distant land and cannot be securely connected with any known Chenla lineage. George Cœdès considered its style closer to early Cham inscriptions than to those of Funan or Chenla, and noted that the Bhadreśvara worshipped at Vat Phou bears the name of Champa's principal deity at Mỹ Sơn. He therefore argued that Champasak and Vat Phou were not under Chenla in the 5th century and that Chenla's early centre should be sought further south. Anton O. Zakharov similarly treats the stele as evidence for an autonomous polity belonging to neither Champa nor Chenla, within a middle Mekong region of several independent states.

On the southern-origin interpretation, Bhavavarman I and Mahendravarman I instead originated in the southern plain of the Tonlé Sap, specifically the Sambor Prei Kuk, and later extended their influence northward towards Bassac-Pakse and the Chi–Mun Valley. These expeditions appear to have had limited lasting political effects. Regional inscriptions for several centuries afterwards name no ruler from the Tonlé Sap basin after the period of Mahendravarman. Anurak Depimai likewise characterises the relationship under Isanavarman I as a network of kinship and patronage rather than direct administrative rule, from which Si Thep and Dvaravati emerged as the southern centre weakened under Bhavavarman II. On this interpretation, Wen Dan would represent a northern polity that was not directly governed from the Tonlé Sap, weakening the basis for identifying it with Bhavapura.

The Chinese record of the Sui period provides evidence for the northern side of this relationship. Chenla is said to have bordered Dàomíng to the north and to have extended north-eastward to the territory of Huanzhou, in the present-day Vinh and Hà Tĩnh area, suggesting that the frontier later associated with Wen Dan was already within Chenla's sphere. The Book of Sui further records Cān Bàn and Zhū Jiāng as states on friendly terms with Chenla, in contrast to Lin Yi and Tou Yuan, which Hoshino romanises Tuo Huan and identifies with pre-Khmer Lopburi, that is Lavo, with which Chenla was said to be continually at war. (Note: The final character of the name, 環 or 洹, is romanised both huan and yuan, so that Hoshino's Qian Tuo Huan and the Tou Yuan of other treatments render the same Chinese. He equates it with Lavo and reconstructs the full name as something like Lavo Chandahan, from an Indianised Candapura or Kandapura, while noting a difficulty in the use of huan rather than fen in names of this kind.) Hoshino adds that Cān Bàn and Piao maintained the closest and most frequent relations with Chenla throughout the Tang period, both before and after its division. Cān Bàn, which sent tribute alongside a still-unified Chenla in 625 and 628, subsequently appears in the Chinese notices as a vassal of Wen Dan.

Whether the K.978 Ban Wang Phai inscription from Si Thep places Chenla's territory that far north has itself been reopened. George Cœdès identified its Śrī Bhavavarman with Bhavavarman I and took the inscription as evidence that Chenla reached Si Thep. Kangwon Katchima's palaeographic reading instead dates the stone to after BE 1170, or about 627 CE, later than the reign of Bhavavarman I. Anurak Depimai accepts this dating and identifies the Bhavavarman of the inscription as a local ruler of Si Thep who adopted Chenla titulature, connected to the Funan–Chenla line through a grandfather whose identity remains disputed, either Rudravarman of Funan on Cœdès's reading or Devanika of K.365 on Claude Jacques's. On the same reading the descent of Bhavavarman I from Prathivindravarman also falls away. The Wat Ban Khwao inscription at Phimai names Vīravarman as the father of Mahendravarman and, on Depimai's reconstruction, of Bhavavarman I as well, making the two full brothers.

The connection between the proposed Wen Dan territory and Si Thep is nevertheless supported by archaeological evidence from Kantharawichai, Mueang Fa Daet Song Yang and Champasri, all of which show substantial links with Dvaravati Si Thep.

==== Isanavarman's network and its collapse ====
The reign of Isanavarman I appears to mark the formation of the network that Wen Dan later inherited. Beyond its southern core, Chenla's influence worked through those same ties of kinship and patronage. After the annexation of Funan in 627, Cān Bàn and Zhū Jiāng entered into royal intermarriages with Chenla, while Chenla was simultaneously at war with Huan Wang to the east and Tou Yuan to the west.

The extent of this network is suggested by evidence on both sides of the Chenla core, although the western evidence is disputed. The K.964 copper plate from U Thong records a Śrī Harshavarman who succeeded to the throne and claimed descent from a King Śrī Īśānavarman. Robert Brown identified the latter with Isanavarman I, while Michael Vickery interpreted Harṣavarman as the ruler of a branch of Chenla royalty centred in what is now central or eastern Thailand. The inscription's date and genealogy, however, remain disputed, with later palaeographic readings placing it in the 8th or 9th century. Karen Mudar's settlement analysis found U Thong to have been a relatively minor centre by the 10th century, leading her to suggest that the inscription may reflect the loss of an earlier autonomy and the town's incorporation into a wider regional system rather than the presence of a royal court. This concerns U Thong's political standing. The inscription's date and genealogy are not at issue. The eastern connection is more securely attested. Isanavarman I's daughter Śarvāṇī married the Cham prince Jagaddharma, whose son Prakāśadharma later acceded in Champa as Vikrantavarman I. The C.96 inscription, dated to 657 or 658, records the marriage and succession.

This network appears to have weakened rapidly after Isanavarman I. Under Bhavavarman II, authority in the eastern part of the region was exercised from Jyeṣṭhapura, probably around Prasat Khao Noi and Mueang Phai, while the last notice associated with it records a campaign against Sambuka in 639, a name several scholars place at Dvaravati Nakhon Pathom. Patcharaporn Ngernkerd and colleagues name Lopburi beside Nakhon Pathom, and read the reference as one of three to a single town of central Thailand, the others being the 8th- or 9th-century inscription K. 577 from Lop Buri and the epigraphy of Preah Khan at Angkor. The two inscriptions stand about a century and a half apart, and no other source read for this article connects them. By 647, Tou Yuan had become a vassal of Dvaravati, and Depimai sees Si Thep and Dvaravati emerging as the southern network weakened. In the north, however, the network did not simply disappear. Cān Bàn, which had sent tribute alongside a united Chenla in 625 and 628, later appears as a vassal of Wen Dan, while Wen Dan itself sent tribute independently from 717. Hoshino accordingly argues that political allegiance in this region was attached to ruling persons and their relationships rather than to fixed territorial states, allowing loyalties to shift without requiring territorial conquest. Woodward's reconstruction extends Wen Dan's sphere well beyond the Isan region, reaching Lopburi, Nakhon Pathom, U Thong and Khu Bua, with Si Thep as its hub, and extending south to the later Angkor region. This proposed sphere overlaps geographically with part of the network associated with Isanavarman I, although no direct continuity between the two is established.

==== Independent polity: 681 – 800s ====
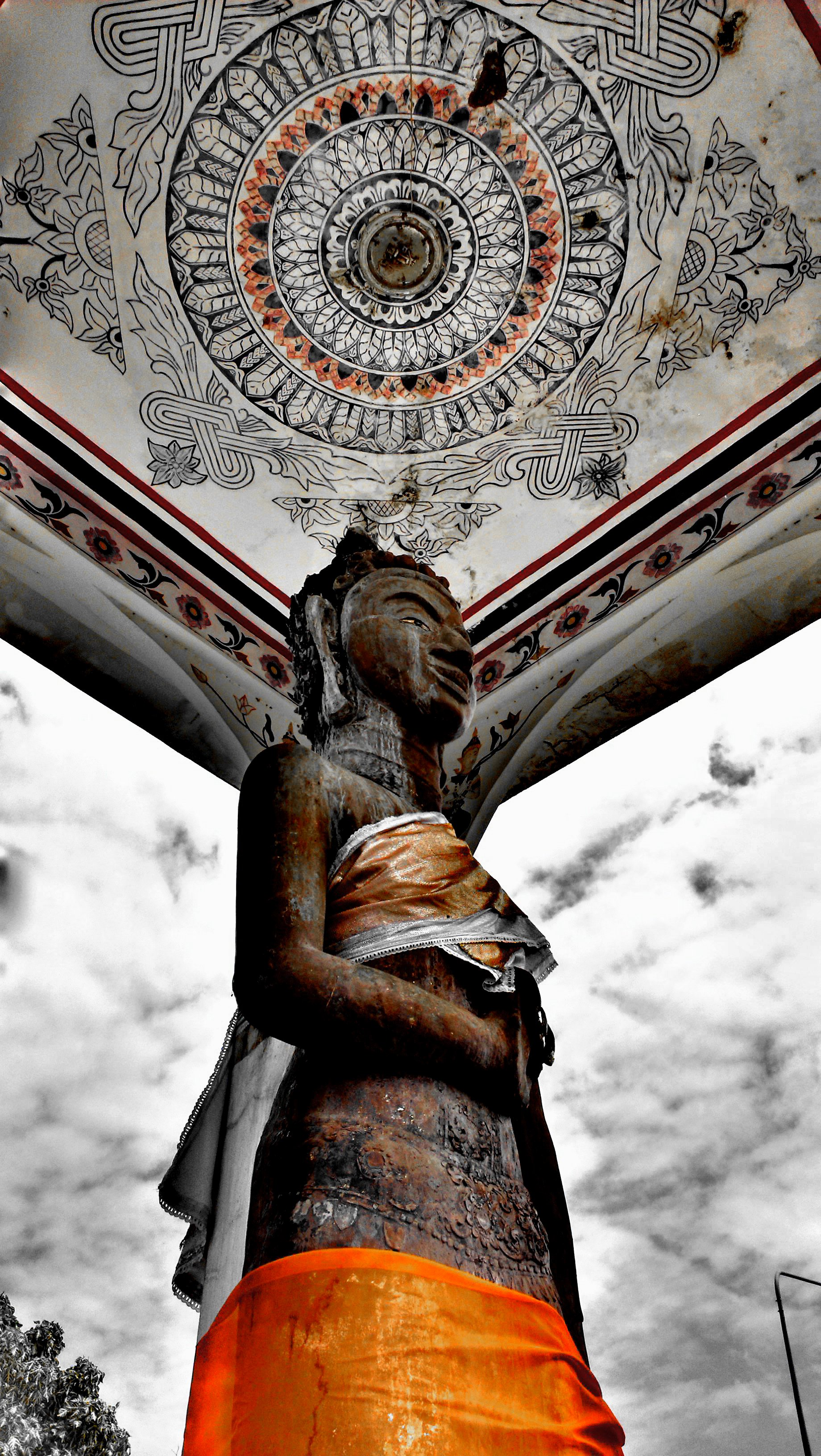
Phra Phuttha Ming Muang in Kantarawichai, Mahsarakham

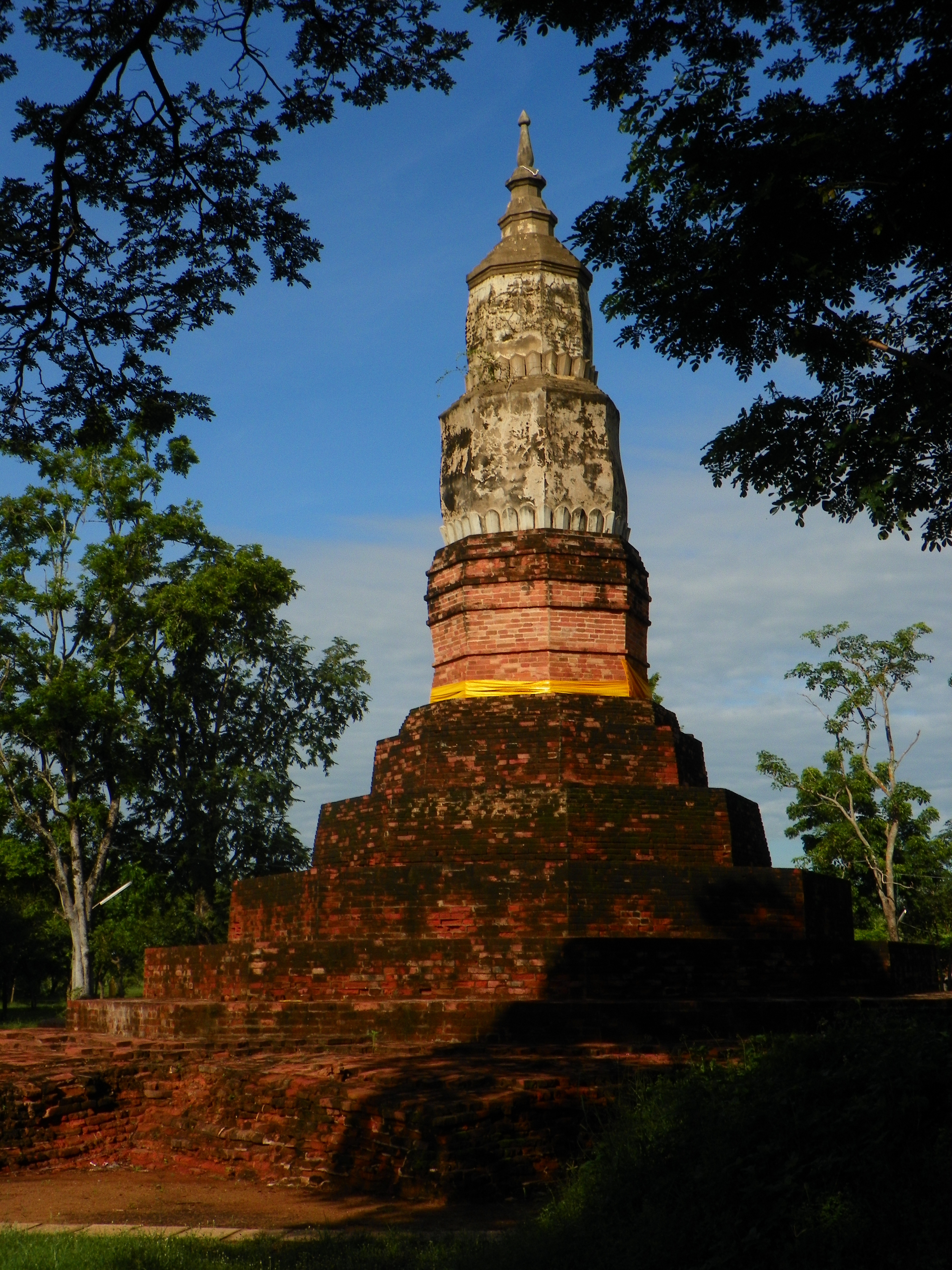
Prataduyaku in Mueang Fa Daet Song Yang, dated the 7th-11th century.

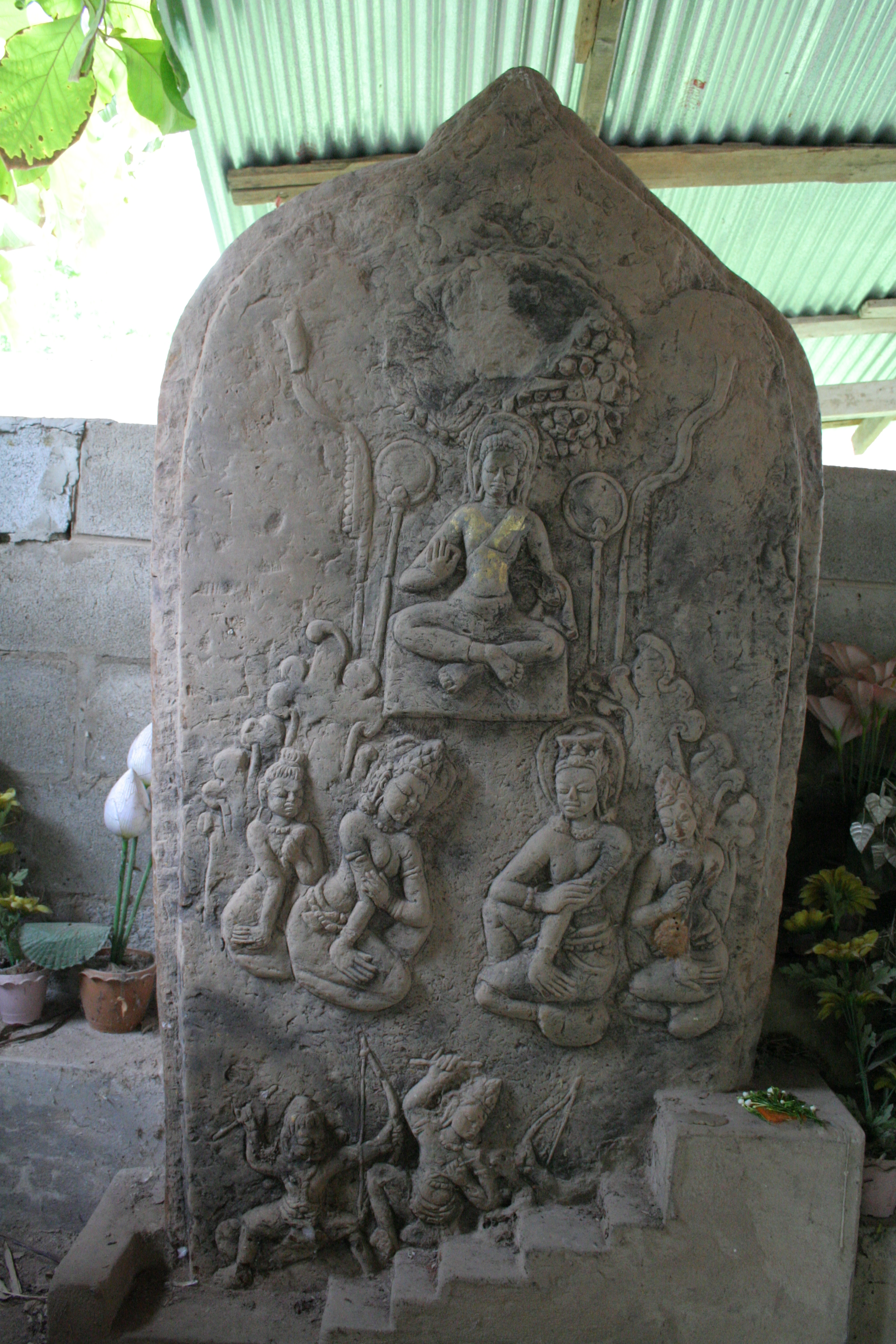
Dvaravati's Sema stone recovered from Mueang Fa Daet, Kalasin

Artifacts and remnants discovered in the suggested area of Wen Dan show the influence of Dvaravati in the area before the onset of the Angkor period in the 10th century

Attributing the secession of Upper Chenla, or Wen Dan, to weakened authority at Sambhupura, Pierre Dupont proposed that it broke away in 707 and that the resulting polity was named "Bhavapura" in honor of its first prominent ruler, Bhavavarman I. George Cœdès, by contrast, identified the polity with "Mūladeśa", a toponym attested in the K.187 inscription, and dated the separation to the end of Jayavarman I's reign, around 681. Cœdès proposed the identification in 1936 on the basis of Bernhard Karlgren's reconstruction of Chinese phonology and argued that the name survived in that of the Mun River.

Hoshino dates the separation to 705–707 and treats 717, when the Tang court received separate tribute from Chenla and Wen Dan, as the earliest clear evidence of the division rather than its date of origin. He proposes Kantharawichai as the inner capital (nei cheng) where the king resided, and Fa Daet as the outer capital (wai cheng). Other scholars have proposed different locations, including Thakhek and Fa Daet. Survey of the standing remains gives a different emphasis. Fa Daet has more than fourteen religious structures, Buddhist stupa and vihara, scattered within and near a complex of waterways, but only limited evidence of habitation. Mueang Sema has been read the same way, as a large ceremonial centre rather than a village or an incipient administrative one. Both are called merely the most impressive of several large centres established in northeast Thailand. The remaining polities of Lower Chenla, including Sambhupura, Vyādhapura, and Bālādityapura, are generally considered to have disappeared by the late 8th century.

Hoshino cautions against treating the division as a single political rupture. In his view, allegiance was owed personally to an overlord and could lapse upon his death, allowing a ruler to acknowledge the king of united Chenla while also sending tribute to China independently.

Following the secession, Wen Dan was probably ruled by Bhavavarman I's offspring. It was believed that Jayasimhavarman, cited in the Monic K.404 Stèle de Phu Khiao Kao found in Chaiyaphum province, dated 7th–8th century, was the first Wen Dan king. Sarah Talbot describes the same inscription as a seventh- or eighth-century Sanskrit text with Mon characteristics, found at Nong Hin Tan in Chaiyaphum, which names a king Jaya Singhavarman. The sole historical documentations concerning Wen Dan during this period are the Chinese records from the Tang dynasty, which provide more insight into Wen Dan's relations with China than its dealings with the lower Chenla. The travel route to China clearly through the Annamite mountain passes to Nghean, and thereafter to Jiaozhou.

No record mentions Wen Dan after the last tribute sent to China in 799. If Wen Dan was Bhavapura as proposed by some scholars, it was probably under the ancestors of Rajendravarman II, who, through his dynasty, later brought the kingdom under Yaśodharapura during his reign at Angkor from 944 to 968. Woodward's two readings of the end of Wen Dan, defeat by Jayavarman II or alliance with him against Si Thep, are set out above.

Japanese scholar Tatsuo Hoshino suggests that, following the end of the Wen Dan or trans-Mekong confederated city-states period around the 800s, the region entered a new period, known as Java, and its successors were standing at the threshold for the new era for Tai-speaking people of Southeast Asia.

=== Java – Angkorian period: 800s – 1300s ===
The identity of Javā in later Cambodian inscriptions remains uncertain. It has been interpreted as a mythical place, the island of Java, the northern Malay Peninsula, Champa, a polity in the upper Mekong region, and Wen Dan. Michel Ferlus likewise identified it with Land Zhenla, which he equated with Wen Dan. Hoshino instead argues that two places called Java existed in the Mekong basin, neither corresponding to the Indonesian island. He identifies the upper Java with Sa Lu, which he considers the Khmu kingdom of Sawa and a precursor of Luang Prabang. His identification is based on the correspondence between the Tai letters s and w and the Sanskrit j and v.

Despite its disappearance from the historical record after the early ninth century, if Wén Dān is to be identified with Bhavapura, it may have continued to exist in a subordinate or dependent capacity until the accession of Rajendravarman II (r. 944–968), himself a member of the Bhavapura lineage, to the Angkorian throne in 944. Through his lineage, Bhavapura was brought under Yaśodharapura during his reign, expanding the Angkor territory to Laos and the eastern Menam Valley in central Thailand, as far north as southern China – possibly through an alliance formation with local chiefdoms to defend against Nanzhao in the 8th century – and also won over Champa. Another proposed center of Wen Dan at Kantharawichai, or Gandharath in the local chronicle, was abandoned following the fall of the Dvaravati civilization in the 10th century. Its southern vassal, Champasri, evolved to Yamanadvipa but was later deserted in the 14th century, due to the invasion by King Fa Ngum of Luang Phrabang after he successfully reunited the Laotian Kingdoms, whereas, the outer center at Mueang Fa Daet Song Yang, founded in 621, was maintained until its decline in importance in the 17th century. Wen Dan was probably replaced by a semi-legendary Laotian kingdom of Kuruntha, centered at Saket Nakhon (present-day Roi Et), as local legend claims its territory covered two former Wen Dan polities, Mueang Champasri to the west and Mueang Fa Daet Song Yang to the north. Kantharawichai itself was repopulated by the Vientiane's Lao people around the 17th century, as evidenced by the oldest Lan Xang-style temple, which was built in 1702. The village was named Ban Kan Thang (บ้านกันทาง), then renamed "Kantharawichai" by the Siamese king Rama V in 1874 and was governed from Kalasin.

== People ==
Japanese scholar Tatsuo Hoshino proposes that Wen Dan was possibly an early polity of Tai-speaking people. Woodward, who accepts Hoshino's location of the two capitals, regards the linguistic argument as tendentious and holds that it should be used neither to support nor to invalidate the geographical conclusion. The linguistic evidence to support the presence of the Tai or early Daic in the central Isan region is that, in the toponym "wén dān" 文單, the character wén 文 can also be transliterated as man^{4} in Cantonese, which is widely used by Daic dialects to refer to village across the area in Yunnan and northern Myanmar. Meanwhile, another character dān 單 can be pronounced sin^{6}, sin^{4}, sim^{4}, or sham, which possibly means the proto-Siamese people. On the same reading they had lived in northern Champa, in the present-day Nghệ An and Thanh Hóa provinces and in the Northwest provinces of modern Vietnam. They probably began moving to the central Mekong valleys around the 5th–6th centuries, following Haudricourt in taking the third century as the earliest possible date for a westward movement of tonal Tai out of Chinese-controlled Vietnam. The relocation continued via the trans-Mekong trade network, and they then spread throughout the Isan region and down into the Chao Phraya basin over the centuries that followed.

Hoshino also reads the system of two chief centres the same way. Wen Dan has Kantharawichai (Nèi Chéng 内 城; lit. 'inner city') with Fa Daet Song Yang (Wài Chéng 外城; lit. 'outer city'), and Zhān Bó has Champasri (Zhān 瞻) with Muang Bua (Bó 博). The later Tai kingdoms are arranged the same way, among them Sukhothai with Si Satchanalai of the Sukhothai Kingdom, Xieng Dong with Xieng Thong of Lan Xang, Wiang Chieng Mai with Wiang Kum Kam of Lan Na, and Ayodhya with Lopburi of the Ayutthaya Kingdom. Several early Lao petty kingdoms in the legends of Phadaeng Nang Ai and Fa Daet Song Yang are described the same way. Hoshino takes that pattern, together with the name of Wen Dan's ruler as the Chinese recorded it, as further evidence for Tai presence in the Isan region in this period.

Hoshino applies the same reasoning to the vassals. He reads the northern one, Dàomíng, as a rendering of thao müang, and places it outside Isan on the ground that its people are described as having neither salt nor iron, from which he infers that both were Wen Dan products of interest to Chinese officials. He reads Cān Bàn, in the upper Pasak River valley, as another early Tai city-state, taking 参 as Cantonese sam, which he links to Siam, and 半, bun, as a reflex of the Sanskrit pūra.

The epigraphy points a different way from the toponyms. Talbot, reporting Claude Jacques, notes that Pali was the only scholarly language known from the Dvaravati kingdoms to the west. The use of Old Mon is therefore a distinctive feature of the early communities of the northeast. Pre-ninth-century Mon inscriptions there are found on sema stones and on terracotta votive tablets, and a short undated inscription in the National Museum at Khon Kaen is wholly in Mon apart from a Khmer phrase designating kingship. On the Chi drainage itself, Welch reports that the inscriptions of the 7th to 10th centuries are all in Sanskrit.

== Historiography ==
Wen Dan was long identified with Vientiane, a view Hoshino traces to late 19th-century European orientalists and reports as still held by some Chinese scholars.

Woodward (2003) proposed that Wen Dan controlled the Angkor region for much of the 8th century, until Jayavarman II came to the throne in 802. He rested that proposal in part on two sets of Buddhist boundary stones (Bai sema) on Mt. Kulen, which he took to be Wen Dan foundations, but afterwards described the argument as incautious, since the political implications would differ entirely according to whether the stones were made shortly before or shortly after 802 and no such precision is attainable. The case he retained rests instead on the Angkor region itself, where from about the 720s inscriptions become scarce and monumental construction appears to cease, a pattern he reads as consistent with warfare and depleted resources although also with a change of ideological outlook. On his reconstruction Wen Dan was subsequently defeated by Jayavarman II, the evidence being the coincidence of the last Wen Dan embassy with Jayavarman II's accession and the absence of remains clearly datable to the 9th century at Si Thep; he offers as an alternative that the communities of the Mun and Chi watersheds resented Si Thep's predominance and allied with Jayavarman II against it.

Within the proposed Wen Dan sphere, Woodward also treats the hoard of Buddhist bronzes from a temple site on Plai Bat hill (เขาปลายบัด) in Prakhon Chai and Lahan Sai districts of Buriram province as plausibly Wen Dan in origin. He notes that a small bodhisattva of that type in the Norton Simon Museum retains the short garment with incised lines and straight lower edge found on a bronze Avalokiteśvara from Prasat Ak Yom in the Angkor region, and argues on that basis that the bronze tradition can be traced in part to the Ak Yom sculptors and that craftsmen moved north as Wen Dan expanded. The Siamese chronicle tradition gives a different account of the same area. It holds that Talung (เมืองตลุง), corresponding to modern Prakhon Chai district, together with Sukhothai and Lavo, was brought under the suzerainty of Padumasūriyavaṁśa, a ruler seated in the central Menam valley whose reign is dated in the tradition to 757–about 800. The two chronologies do not coincide. Woodward places the Wen Dan expansion in the first half of the 8th century, whereas the chronicle tradition places Padumasūriyavaṁśa's rule in the second half of the century. (Note: The two accounts have not been discussed together in the published literature.)

== List of rulers ==
Name	Reign	Notes
Srimanya? (Note: There is also a monarch bearing a nearly identical name, Śrīmānarāja, mentioned in an Old Khmer inscription in Sanskrit on the Bai Sema at Wat Pa Nong Peng, Ban Phue District, Udon Thani Province, whose reign is described as a period of chaos.)	6th–7th century	Found the name in Pallava Sanskrit inscriptions on sandstone statue in Ban Wan (บ้านหว้าน), Rasi Salai District.
Under the united Chenla until 681.
On Hoshino's reading, Tai-speaking groups had settled in the middle Mekong by the 6th century and spread across Isan over the centuries that followed.
Jayasimhavarman	681? – 717?	Bhavavarman (I?)'s relative.
Woodward proposed that Wen Dan through Si Thep exercised some control over Lopburi, Nakhon Pathom, U Thong and Khu Bua during the early 8th century.
Ts’ie-k’i-wou (Tsekiu; 屈子)	717 – 754	First tribute sent to China in 717.; Allied with Nghean lord (Tai or Hmong) to capture Jiaozhou from the Chinese governor.
Probable son of Tsekiu	754 – 771	Allied with China against Nanzhao
Po Mi (婆彌)	771 – ?	Led the embassy of 771 with eleven trained elephants, accompanied by his wife; entertained at the imperial palace on 13 December 771 and given the title kaifu yitongsansi.; Called the heir apparent by the New Book of Tang and wang, king, by the Cefu Yuangui.
Lin Jong (ลินจง)	c. 785	As the king of Gandharath, based on local legend.; Last Wen Dan's tribute led by the envoy Lītóují (李頭及) sent to China was in 798.
Lin Thong (ลินทอง)		Usurper king of Gandharath, based on local legend. Son of the previous.
As per local legend, after Lin Thong overthrew his father, Lin Jong, Gandharath faced several circumstances during his reign, and Lin Thong eventually died shortly after he acceded to the throne. However, some believe that this story is influenced by the Buddhism story of Bimbisara and his son Ajatashatru.
Woodward proposed that Wen Dan was then defeated by Jayavarman II, on the coincidence of the last embassy with his accession and the absence of remains clearly datable to the 9th century at Si Thep. He offers as an alternative that the communities of the Mun and Chi watersheds resented Si Thep's predominance and allied with Jayavarman II against it.
The region entered the Java period (Yamanadvipa) around the 9th century.
No records on Wen Dan after the 9th century; however, there are several semi-legenday Laotian polities, such as Kuruntha, Gotapura, Nong Han Noi (หนองหานน้อย), and Nong Han Luang, emerged in the Chi, Songkhram Basins, and others, as cited in the Laotian Phra That Phanom Chronicle or Urangkhathat (อุรังคธาตุ) and the well known legend of Phadaeng Nang Ai, both dated 10th–13th centuries.
