= Champasri =

Ancient settlement in Thailand

- จำปาศรี (Thai)
- Interactive map of Champasri
- 15°43′14″N 103°16′25″E
- Type: Human settlement
- Periods: Pre-history
- Cultures: Dvaravati; Angkorian
- Associated with: Mon people; Lao people; Thai people
- Location: Na Dun, Maha Sarakham, Thailand

History
- Built: c. 7th century
- Abandoned: c. 13th century

Site notes
- Material: Brick, Laterite, Sandstone, Ceramics
- Area: 3.76 square kilometres (376 ha)
- Excavation dates: 2006
- Archaeologists: Mahasarakham University
- Condition: Mostly destroyed
- Owner: Private
- Public access: Yes

Champasri (Thai: จัมปาศรี) was an ancient settlement located in Ku Santarat Subdistrict, Na Dun district, Maha Sarakham, northeastern Thailand. Found in the 7th century during the Dvaravati period and was abandoned around the 13th century due to the decline of the Angkor. It was repopulated by Lao people from Roi Et around the 19th century following the establishment of Maha Sarakham in 1865.

Champasri was a supra-regional center of the Dvaravati civilization, together with Si Thep, Mueang Fa Daet Song Yang, Dong Mueang Aem, Non Mueang and others, but little known about its political structure. Each of these could have previously been the center of an ancient kingdom. In the case of Champasri, it was said to be the capital of the same named city-state.

Tatsuo Hoshino suggests Champasri was one of the vassals of an ancient Wen Dan.

== Layout and location ==
The ancient city of Champasri is a double-moat ancient settlement. It has an oval shape, with a wide base in the north and a tapering tip in the south. It is approximately 2 kilometers wide and 4 kilometers long. It has a 20-meter-wide moat and an earthen embankment that is 3 meters high and 6 meters wide. The inner city was built during the Dvaravati period, while the outer one was later developed in the Angkorian era. To the east, 200 meters beyond the outer moat, evidence of a big rectangular pond, known as "Nong E Lai" (หนองอีไล) by the locals, was discovered, stretching parallel to the city and storing water for agricultural use and to sustain community expansion.

Several streams flow around the site and finally travel 8 kilometers south to the Lam Tao (ลำเตา), one of the Mun River's tributaries.

== Findings ==
In archaeological surveys performed in 1988, mounds and ruins were found scattered throughout the city; some were destroyed, and some are still intact. Later in 2006, an excavation by the Faculty of Architecture, Urban Design and Creative Arts of Mahasarakham University discovered 25 ancient sites scattered throughout the city, for example, Sala Nang Khao (ศาลานางขาว), Ku Noi (กู่น้อย), Ku Santrat (กู่สันตรัตน์), and a stupa containing the relics of the Buddha, the founder of Buddhism. Mon and old Khmer inscriptions found in the back of votive tablets dated the 12th century.

Settlements can be classified into three stages, as follows:

1. Prehistory and early history periods (before the 7th century): several mounds contain evidence of prehistoric human occupation; human burials were found dating from the prehistoric era to an early historical period. Iron tools and pottery antiques such as teapots, pottery bowls, pottery plates, various types of pottery, bronze bracelets, and carnelian beads were discovered numerously across the site.
2. Dvaravati period (7th—10th century): the community was indianized and developed into a complex society. It had more contact with the other communities. Although Buddhism was the dominant religion, cremation-free burial practices are still practiced. Rituals were combined with religious beliefs, as there were two small egg-shaped jars with lids were found containing cremated human bones with ashes buried together, showing that the belief in Buddhism related to funeral rites by cremation and then collecting ashes, placing them in jars then burying them. The inner moat was built during this era.
3. Angkorian period (10th–13th century): Dvaravati declined. Angkorian began to influence the region and Hinduism was the main belief. Fragments of both glazed and unglazed pottery were found, which are assumed to be the product of Buriram kilns. The outer moat was built. Outside the city wall, 300 meters to the south, Prasat Ku Santarat (กู่สันตรัตน์) is situated in the Wat Ku Tai temple (วัดกู่ใต้). It was built around 1157–1208 during the reign of Jayavarman VII of the Angkor.
