= Dàomíng Kingdom =

Ancient kingdom in Laos

- 1st – 7th centuries
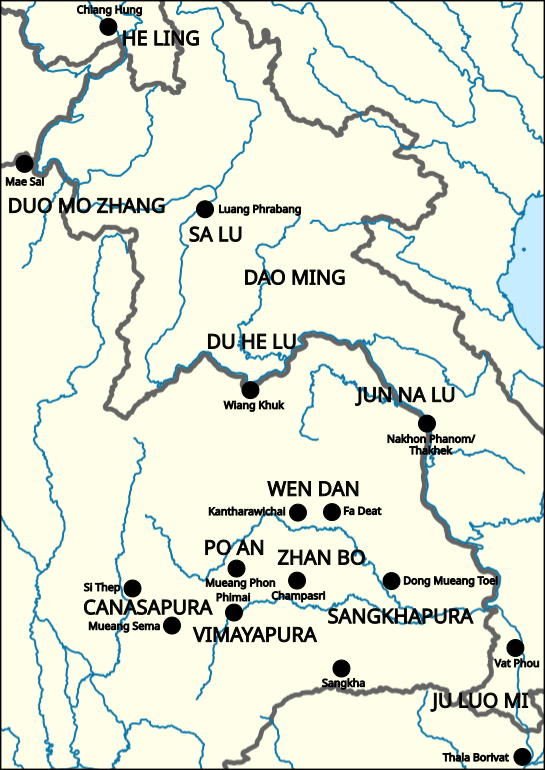
- Proposed location of polities in the middle Mekong region in the 7th century CE.
- Government: Kingdom
- Historical era: Post-classical era
- Today part of: Laos

Dàomíng Kingdom (Chinese: 道明國) was a polity of the middle Mekong known only from Chinese sources. Tatsuo Hoshino identifies it as the northern vassal of Wen Dan and places it in the northern part of the Mekong valley, on the watershed above the Vientiane plain. Where exactly it lay is unsettled, and southern Laos, northern Laos and the coast of Myanmar have all been proposed.

== Chinese record ==
The Yìyù zhì, written by Zhōu Zhì-zhōng (周致中) under the Yuan dynasty (1271–1368), describes a people who wear no clothing and laugh at those who do, who have neither salt nor iron, and who shoot insects and fish with bamboo crossbows. A similar description reached the Tang annals several centuries earlier, where the inhabitants are said to have gone almost naked, lived by hunting, and had no salt or iron.

The same records place Dàomíng north-east of Lí Zhōu (驪州), in what is now Central Vietnam, and north of Zhenla, which in turn adjoined the Chē Qú Kingdom (車渠) to the east and had been a vassal of Funan. Hoshino reads the same relation from the Zhenla side: Zhenla is said to have been contiguous with Dàomíng on its north.

Hoshino reads the absence of salt and iron as the point of the notice rather than an incidental detail. The compilers, he suggests, were advising Chinese officials to take no notice of a country with nothing worth trading for, implicitly by contrast with Wen Dan, whose trade was already known to be valuable; on his account salt and iron may have been among Wen Dan's own products.

== Location ==
Hoshino takes the absence of salt and iron to rule out a position within Isan, where both were produced, and places Dàomíng instead on the northern Mekong, straddling the watershed north of the Vientiane plain, which has a salt mine at Ban Bò. He also reads the name itself as a possible Chinese rendering of the Tai thao müang, a vassal prince or chief, which would make it a description of the polity's standing rather than a name.

Other proposals place Dàomíng in south-eastern Laos or on the coast of Myanmar, the southern Laos position being the more widely held, while a further suggestion treats the name as a variant of Tángmíng (堂明国), a polity of the Liao people founded about the 1st century CE with its centre at Zhenning and extending into northern Laos.
