= Yamanadvipa =

7th century political entity

Yamana/ Yen-nio-na-cheu
- 650s – 1350s
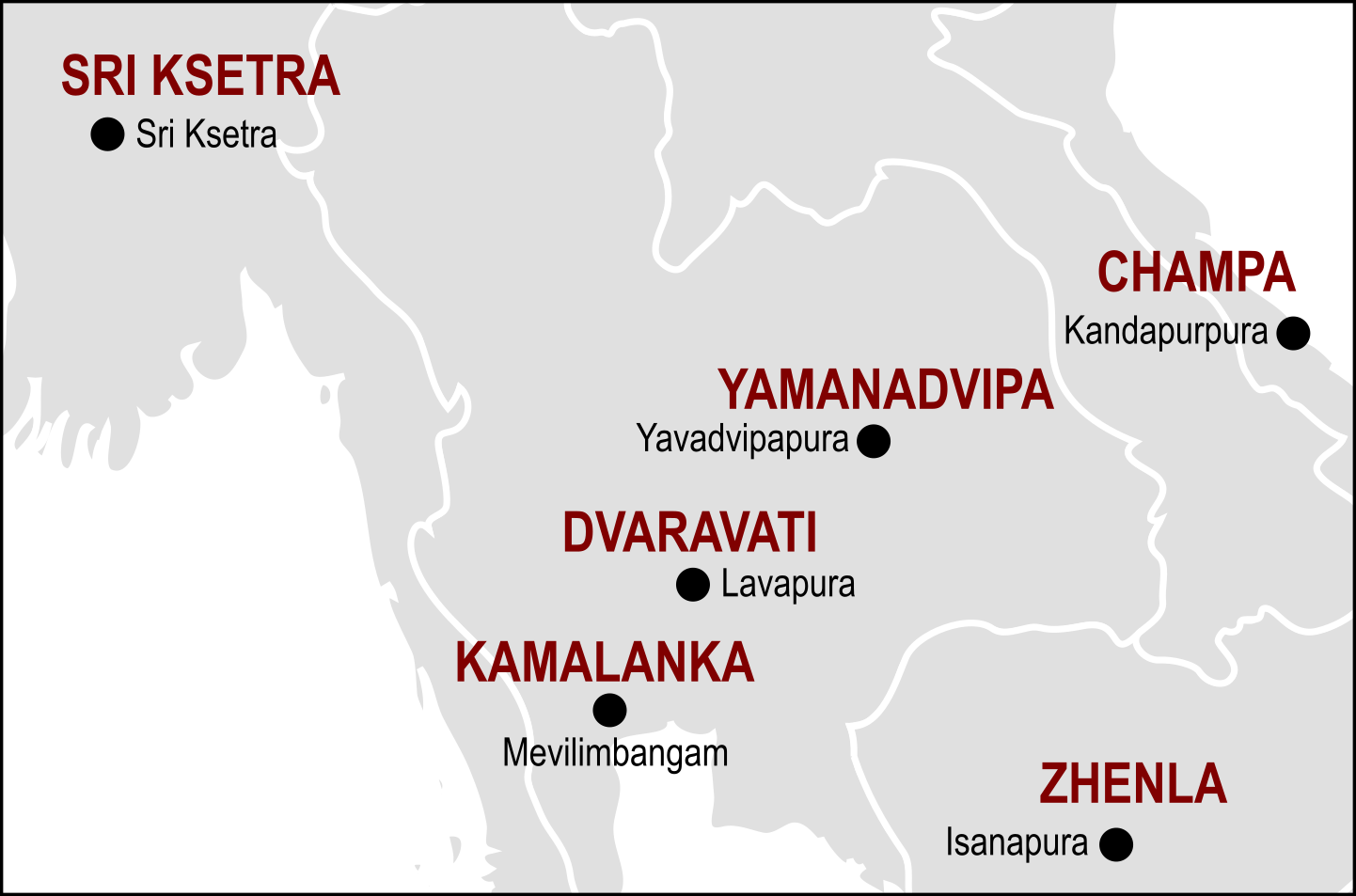
- Proposed location of Yamanadvipa, with the other five kingdoms in Mainland Southeast Asia mentioned by Xuanzang in the 7th century.

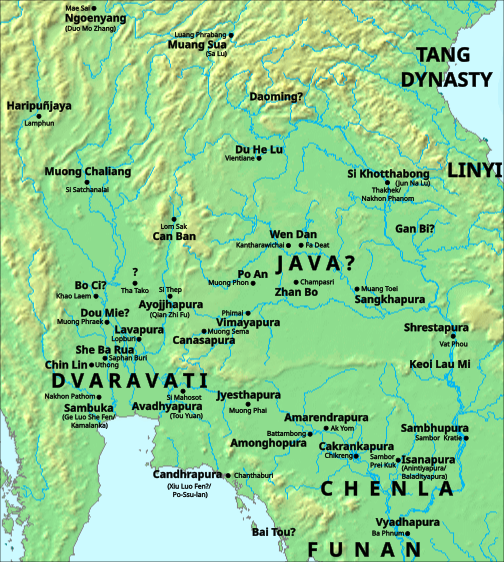
- Proposed locations of ancient kingdoms in Menam and Mekong Valleys in the 7th century based on the details provided in the Chinese leishu, Cefu Yuangui, and others.
- Historical era: Post-classical era
  - Established: 650s
  - Mentioned by Xuanzang: 7th century
  - First envoy from Indrapura: 911
  - Mentioned in Angkor source: 1200s
  - Last mentioned in Champa source: 1306
  - Disestablished: 1350s
Preceded by	Succeeded by
Zhān Bó; Wen Dan	Lan Xang
- Today part of: Thailand; Laos

Yamanadvīpa, also rendered Java, is a polity of mainland Southeast Asia known from the travel account of the Chinese monk Xuanzang and, under related names, from inscriptions in Champa and Cambodia. Neither its location nor the relationship between the several similar names has been established.

Proposals for what the Javā of the later Cambodian inscriptions denotes range from the island of Java to several places on the mainland, and include the view that the whole tradition is mythical. Arlo Griffiths has argued instead that the Khmer and Cam inscriptions mean the island of Java wherever they use these names, and that the mainland readings rest on weak foundations.

== Attestation and name ==
Xuanzang records the name as Yen-nio-na-cheu (閻摩那洲國) in the account of his pilgrimage in India. He situates the kingdom to the west of Mo-ho-chan-po (Mahacampa), identifiable as Lin-i, and lists it among six realms located beyond the “deep seas,” enclosed by high mountains and rivers that were difficult to access. The other Mainland Southeast Asian kingdoms enumerated by Xuanzang include Sri Ksetra, Kamalanka, Dvaravati, Chenla, and Champa. These six were considered to lie within the Jumukote or Yamakote (यमकोटि; यमकोटी), corresponding to the “Eastern Boundary” of Ptolemy’s cartographical representation of Jambudvipa.

The precise identification of Yamanadvīpa remains confusing. Yet its Sanskrit suffix dvīpa (Sanskrit: द्वीप), meaning “island” or “land surrounded by water,” has encouraged scholars to associate it with an insular or riverine setting. The element yamana (Sanskrit: यमन), meaning “restraining,” “curbing,” "eastern," "border," or “governing,” has further complicated interpretive attempts. Some researchers have equated Yamanadvīpa with Yavanadvīpa (Sanskrit: यवनद्वीप), noting that a “king of Yavana” appears in the Preah Khan inscription (K.908) of Jayavarman VII alongside the “king of Java” and two rulers of Champa. George Cœdès took that “Yavana” for Annam and read the stanza as making the kings it names vassals of the Khmer king. Claude Jacques rejected the vassalage and looked for other places for Javā and Yavana, holding that a Sanskrit poem addressed to a god would not state a factual untruth. Arlo Griffiths answers that royal inscriptions across the Indianised world made counterfactual claims of suzerainty, the kings of Java among them, and keeps the identification of Yavana with Đại Việt.

In northern Champa, the inscription C. 149 of 833 Śaka (911 CE) records the career of a dignitary who served the kings of the Indrapura dynasty. He was sent to Yavadvīpapura, the capital of Yavadvīpa, on a diplomatic mission, and went there a second time on the same assignment. Yavadvīpa appears again in C. 22, which is no earlier than 1228 Śaka (1305 or 1306 CE) and names a daughter of the lord of Yava who came from Yavadvīpa. Griffiths prints these lines in a provisional reading and says that the passage is badly preserved in parts and that he does not fully understand it. The Cam inscriptions use both Javā and Yavadvīpa. Griffiths holds that the Cam material by itself cannot show what either name denoted, but that there is no reason to suppose the two denoted different places.

== Identifications ==
There was also a kingdom with an almost identical name, Chawa or Sawa (Lao: ຊວາ, pronounced [súa]) of Khmu people, located northwest of Champa, and bordered Gotapura, centered at Thakhek, to the south. This area may have been influenced by the culture of Dvaravati in central Thailand. Lao tradition has Chawa later conquered by Khun Lo of the Lao people in 698. The polity was then Taificated and historically known as Muang Sua. It later evolved to Luang Prabang of the Lan Xang kingdom in the 14th century. Hoshino identifies this Sawa with the Sa Lu of the Chinese records.

Michael Vickery reinterpreted the term “Java”, associated with the legacy of Jayavarman II, as referring to “the Chams”. On that reading Yamanadvīpa may correspond to the inland Cham polity known in Chinese records as Zhān Bó, whose hypothesized location aligns broadly with that of Yavanadvīpa. Tatsuo Hoshino argues that following the dissolution of the Wen Dan (a trans-Mekong confederation of city-states) in the early ninth century, the Isan region of present-day Thailand entered a political phase he designates as “Java.”

The range of proposals is wider than these two, and none has been established. Reviewing the Javā named in later Cambodian inscriptions, either as an enemy of Jayavarman II or as his place of origin, Hiram Woodward records that it has been treated as possibly wholly mythical by Michael Vickery, as the island of Java if the reference belongs to a late myth, as the northern Malay Peninsula by Claude Jacques, as Champa by Vickery in an earlier work he subsequently rejected, as a principality far up the Mekong by Hoshino, and as Wen Dan itself in Woodward's own reading. Michel Ferlus likewise identified the Javā of the Cambodian inscriptions with Land Zhenla, that is with Wen Dan. Jacques, surveying the older instances of related names, including the Sanskrit Yavadvīpa and the Java of a Cham inscription of 799, concluded that it is not clear what the differing spellings denote, if anything.

Hoshino's own position is more specific than Woodward's summary of it. He holds that two places called Java lay in the Mekong basin rather than one, an upper and a lower, and that neither was in the Indonesian archipelago. The lower he identifies with Du Po, the southern He Ling of the Chinese records; the upper with Sa Lu, which he takes for the Khmu kingdom of Sawa and a precursor of the Lao kingdom later known as Xieng Dong and Xieng Thong, that is Luang Prabang. The equation rests on the correspondence between the Tai letters s and w and the Sanskrit j and v, by which a name pronounced sawa may be romanised java.

Griffiths holds that no mainland reading is needed, and that the Javā of the Khmer inscriptions and the Yavadvīpa of the Cam ones denote the island of Java throughout. His argument is one of nomenclature rather than etymology. In the inscriptions of Java itself yavadvīpa, yavabhūmi and bhūmi java stand for the kings’ own realm from the Canggal inscription of 732 CE onward. Among the names attested in two or more of the three corpora, such as Campā, Kamvuja, Rāmanya, Pukāṃ, Syaṃ and Yavana, the name a people used of itself is the name its neighbours used of it. That leaves Java the one name in the set with no identified referent. On that ground he returns to the identification Pierre Dupont had made of the Javā of the Sdok Kak Thom inscription.

He answers the mainland readings on their evidence rather than on their conclusions. Michel Ferlus derived javā from a word meaning “mountain” and read it as a name applied first to the Khmers and then to what is now northern Laos. Griffiths objects on three grounds. The derivation of Funan from Old Khmer vnaṃ, on which the chain rests, is treated with circumspection by historians. Shorto’s dictionary gloss of the Old Mon form as “native of the region of northern Laos” goes back to a suggestion Gordon Luce made about a passage he himself called obscure. The meaning of the reconstructed Mon-Khmer form is fixed from Aslian languages a millennium younger than the Mon and Khmer evidence. Neither Hoshino nor Ferlus, he adds, can point to a source from northern Laos close in time to the Khmer inscriptions. The Ram Khamhaeng inscription, on which both rely for a möaṅ javā north of Sukhothai, is itself controversial, and may not show that the name was in use in the Luang Prabang area in 1292.
