= Cān Bàn Kingdom =

Ancient kingdom in central Thailand

- 6th – 10th century?
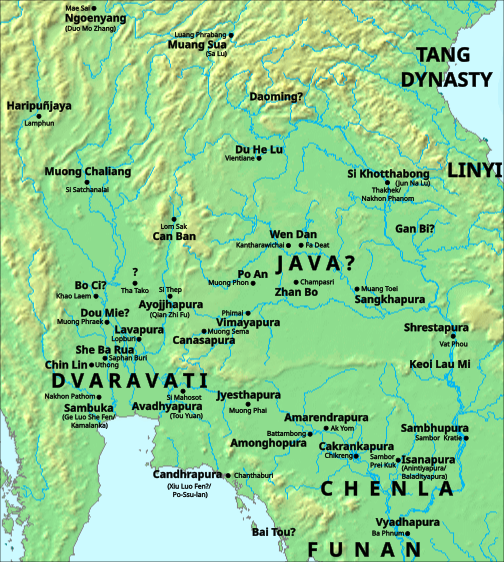
- Proposed locations of ancient kingdoms in Menam and Mekong Valleys in the 7th century based on the details provided in the Chinese leishu, Cefu Yuangui, and others.
- Government: Kingdom
- Historical era: Post-classical era
Succeeded by
Chenla
Wen Dan
Mueang Rat
- Today part of: Thailand

Cān Bàn Kingdom (Chinese: 参半国), rendered Sam Bun in Cantonese, was a polity known only from Chinese records of the 7th and 8th centuries, chiefly the New Book of Tang and the Cefu Yuangui. It is reported to have sent tribute to the Tang court in 625 and again in 628, on both occasions arriving together with tribute from a still united Chenla, and by the time of the later notices it had become a vassal of Land Chenla, that is of Wen Dan.

Where Cān Bàn lay has not been settled. The annals place it north-west of Wen Dan, while a later encyclopaedia describes a town more than a thousand li south-west of Land Chenla, close to the sea and on swampy ground; Tatsuo Hoshino reads the two as successive seats rather than as one place, and reaches no firm site for the earlier of them. Lawrence Palmer Briggs placed the polity instead north-east of the Cardamom Mountains.

Hoshino reads the name as that of an early Tai city-state, an argument Hiram Woodward has objected to. (Note: Hiram Woodward regards Hoshino's argument that the peoples of these polities spoke a Tai language as tendentious, and holds that it should be used neither to support nor to invalidate his geographical conclusions.)

== Chinese record ==
The two Chinese sources place Cān Bàn differently. The New Book of Tang puts it north-west of Wen Dan, whereas the Cefu Yuangui, in an entry dated 1013, gives a position more than a thousand li, over 500 kilometres, south-west of Land Chenla, and describes a town facing the sea or open water on swampy ground, bordered to the south-west by the Bái Tóu Kingdom (白头国).

The tribute missions of 625 and 628 reached China at the same time as tribute from a still united Chenla, and thirty years passed before the Tang court received a first mission from Wen Dan itself.

What the record does not supply is the polity's own name for itself. Hoshino notes that Cān Bàn, like Chenla, is a Chinese rendering that occurs in Chinese sources alone, and that no inscription has been found giving the name its inhabitants used.

== Relations with Chenla and Wen Dan ==
During the Sui period (581–618), Cān Bàn and another polity, Zhū Jiāng, which has been identified both with one of the Dvaravati principalities and, by Hoshino, with the Pyu realm under an older name, (Note: Hoshino suggests that the character jiāng (江) in the name may be corrupt, its left-hand radical being the same as that of bō (波), so that the toponym may stand for Zhū Bō, an old name for the Pyu realm, renamed Piao during the Tang.) entered into royal intermarriages with Chenla, and the two afterwards fought several wars against Tou Yuan to the north-west. Tou Yuan became a vassal of Dvaravati in 647. Through these connections Cān Bàn became a vassal of Chenla.

The Book of Sui names Cān Bàn and Zhū Jiāng as the two states with which Chenla was on friendly terms, against Lin Yi and Tuo Huan, that is Lavo, with which it was constantly at war. Hoshino takes the friendship back to the reign of Mahendravarman, known from inscriptions north of the Dângrêk range and named in the Sui annals as Chenla's first king, and observes that Cān Bàn and Piao were the two states in closest and most frequent contact with Chenla throughout the Tang period, before and after Chenla divided. That division he dates to 705–707, after which Cān Bàn appears in the record as a vassal of Land Chenla, or Wen Dan. (Note: The date of the separation is given variously. Hoshino places it in 705–707, treating the separate tribute of 717 as the point at which it is first documented, while George Cœdès dated it to about 681 and Pierre Dupont to 707.)

== Location and name ==
Hoshino works from three statements in the Chinese record that do not fit a single site. Cān Bàn lay north-west of Wen Dan; it was among the states in closest contact with Chenla; and it could not have been in what is now northern Thailand, so it must have stood somewhat further south, in the central plain. On those grounds his preferred candidate is Si Thep, and he states the objection to it himself: Si Thep lies south-west of Fa Daet, which he takes for Wen Dan's capital, where the records require a position to the north-west. He therefore places the administrative seat further up the Pasak valley, describing it as a local communications hub rather than a place of political or commercial weight, and elsewhere as lying north of Si Thep in the upper central plain.

The entry in the Cefu Yuangui points somewhere else again, to a swampy site near the Gulf more than a thousand li south-west of Land Chenla. If that entry describes Cān Bàn in the 9th and 10th centuries, Hoshino reasons, the seat must by then have moved, most probably to Suphan Buri. Briggs placed the polity north-east of the Cardamom Mountains, near present-day Battambang.

The name has been read for evidence of the population. Hoshino treats Cān Bàn as a Daic toponym alongside Wen Dan: the character 参 is pronounced sam in Cantonese, which he links to Siam, and 半, bun, he takes for one of the Southeast Asian reflexes of the Sanskrit pūra, "town" or "city", so that the whole would name a small Tai state whose capital carried that suffix. No inscription supports the reading, since the polity's own name for itself is unrecorded.
