= Bái Tóu Kingdom =

Ancient kingdom in Southeast Asia

- 7th century
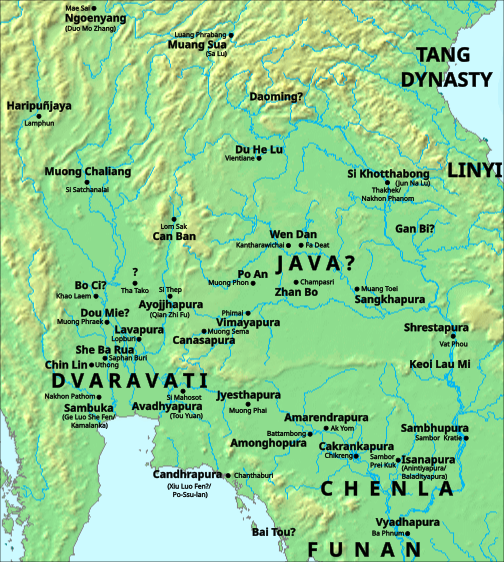
- Proposed locations of ancient kingdoms in Menam and Mekong Valleys in the 7th century based on the details provided in the Chinese leishu, Cefu Yuangui, and others.
- Government: Kingdom
- Historical era: Post-classical era
- Today part of: Thailand; Cambodia

Bái Tóu Kingdom (Chinese: 白头国; lit. 'Kingdom of the white-head people') was an ancient kingdom mentioned in the Chinese leishu, Cefu Yuangui, compiled during the Song dynasty (960–1279 CE). It was located to the west of Funan. Bordered to the southwest of the Cān Bàn Kingdom, which itself was far more than a thousand li (500 kilometers) southwest of Zhenla, and was said to be located on the wetland, and the chief city faces the sea.

The Bái Tóu people, who occupy the region southwest of Funan, are referenced in the New Book of Tang. Their country bordered Cān Bàn. There were two Bái Tóu people in the slave list that Funan gave to China in the 7th century.

No further information is provided about the Bái Tóu Kingdom, and its identification is currently uncertain. Some places it on the eastern coast of the Gulf of Thailand in the present-day Koh Kong province with the chief city near Khemarak Phoumin.
