= Keoi Lau Mì =

Historical country

Keoi Lau Mì Kingdom
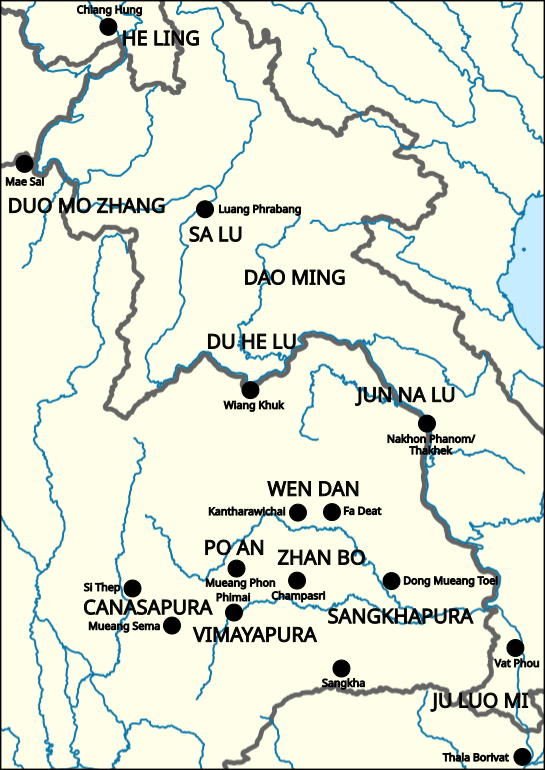
- Proposed location of polities in the middle Mekong region in the 7th century CE.
- Common languages: Kuy
- Government: Kingdom
- Historical era: Post-classical era
  - Establishment: Unknown
  - Sent tribute to China: 656
  - Annexed by Angkor: 11th century
Preceded by	Succeeded by
Chenla	Angkor

Keoi Lau Mi in Cantonese, or Jū Lóu Mì in Mandarin (Chinese: 拘蒌蜜国/拘蔔蜜国), was a polity of the middle Mekong recorded in the Chinese Tang Huiyao and New Book of Tang. The records describe a mountainous population and a country rich in elephants, and compare its customs with those of Chi Tu and of Duò Hé Luó (堕和罗), that is Dvaravati.

The Chinese notices fix its position by bearings and travelling times rather than by any named site, and where it lay is disputed. Tatsuo Hoshino places it around the confluence of the Mun and the Mekong, in the area of Champasak, Ubon Ratchathani and Stung Treng, while a reading that puts Wen Dan at Sambhupura would move it east into what is now Vietnam. Its people have been identified with the Kuy and, in an earlier study by Hoshino, with the Khom.

== Chinese record ==
The Tang Huiyao records a tribute mission to the court of Emperor Gaozong, which brought a five-coloured parrot. The entry is dated to the eighth month of 656 in the text as it stands; Hoshino gives the year as 655 and adds that a second and larger mission from the same area followed. The same records name Pán Pán Zhì Wù, Pó Lì, Bù Shù and Wen Dan among the countries with which it was on good terms, and note that its elephants were raised for use.

== Geographic location ==
The records place Keoi Lau Mi three months' travel by land west of Champa's Línyì, a month by water south-east of Pán Pán Zhì Wù (盘盘致物国), six days' land travel south-east of Wen Dan, ten days' sailing north of Pó Lì (婆利国), and five days' sailing west of Bù Shù (不述国).

Hoshino reads these figures as putting the polity in the south-eastern part of the Nan Hai, which on his account means the middle Mekong rather than any sea, so that it spanned present-day Ubon Ratchathani, Champasak and Stung Treng and perhaps reached down-river as far as Kracheh. He narrows it further to the Champasak region near the confluence of the Mun and the Mekong, and treats the six-day journey north-west as leading to Wen Dan's administrative centre rather than to its frontier. He also rejects the older identification of Pó Lì with Bali, reconstructing the name as ba rei, which he compares with the Cambodian place-name element borey.

== Interpretation ==
Paul Pelliot set the record of this embassy aside, holding that Wen Dan did not yet exist in that year, and proposed that the reading Wen-tan was faulty and should be Tan-tan, which would put the state six days away in the Indonesian archipelago. Hoshino, who reports the passage, observes that Pelliot gave no reason for the first judgement and that the emendation amounts to altering the Tang text to fit the theory. On a reading that places Wen Dan or Land Chenla at Sambhupura, Keoi Lau Mi would instead lie towards the lower Central Highlands of present-day Vietnam.

Thai scholar Thongtham Nathchamnong (ทองแถม นาถจำนง) proposes that Keoi Lau Mi was a kingdom of the Kuy people, who have lived in what is now southern Isan and northern Cambodia since prehistoric times. He reads the character 拘, pronounced keoi1 in Cantonese, as a rendering of their name, and finds the location and customs given in the Chinese source consistent with the areas of significant Kuy population today.

Hoshino proposed in 1996 that Keoi Lau Mi was a polity of the Khom. In his 2002 chapter he calls it the "down-river" Khmer kingdom, giving krom as the term. (Note: Hoshino glosses the Tai khòm as "lower reaches", corresponding to the Khmer krom and standing against lü, "upper reaches". He cites as the living contrast a group in Isan known as Khmer lü who call the Khmer of Cambodia Khmer krom.) He also records the polity as having formerly been known as south Lin Yi, and lists it as one of three candidates for the Champa whose king is said in the Baphuon inscription of 790 to have been captured.
