= Dong Mueang Aem =

- ดงเมืองแอม (Thai)
- Interactive map of Dong Mueang Aem
- 16°49′31.0″N 102°48′34″E
- Type: Human settlement
- Periods: Ancient history
- Cultures: Dvaravati; Chenla
- Associated with: Mon people
- Location: Khao Suan Kwang, Khon Kaen, Thailand

History
- Built: c. 6th century
- Abandoned: c. 18th century

Site notes
- Area: Dong Mueang Aem: 4.84 square kilometres (484 ha); Ban Kho Tha Pho: 1.38 square kilometres (138 ha); Non Mueang Pheng: 0.6 square kilometres (60 ha)
- Excavation dates: 1982
- Archaeologists: Fine Arts Department
- Condition: Mostly destroyed
- Owner: Private
- Management: Dong Mueang Aem Subdistrict Administrative Organization, no entry fee
- Public access: Yes

Dong Mueang Aem (Thai: ดงเมืองแอม) was a group of ancient settlements located in Dong Mueang Aem subdistrict, Khao Suan Kwang, Khon Kaen, northeastern Thailand, controlling trade route between the Songkhram River basin to the north and the Chi–Mun basins to the south. It was inhabited from the 6th – 18th centuries from the Dvaravati to the late Ayutthaya periods, and was once being sacked by Mahendravarman of Chenla during his expansion campaign to the Chi-Mun Valley. After being abandoned for a century, it was repopulated by Lao people in 1859.

Dong Mueang Aem was a supra-regional center of the Dvaravati civilization, together with Si Thep, Mueang Fa Daet Song Yang, and others, but little known about its political structure. It could have previously been the center of an ancient kingdom. According to the Wat Sri Mueang Aem Inscription (K. 1120) discovered in the inner city, Dong Mueang Aem potentially could be linked to the formation of Chenla.

== Layout and location ==
The settlement consisted of three large moated sites, with Dong Mueang Aem being the most noteworthy, as it is the fifth largest ancient settlement in Thailand. The city's shape is uneven, with an east–west width of over 2,400 meters and a north–south breadth of about 2,000 meters. The east side has one layer of moat and one layer of earthen embankment, whereas the west side has one layer of moat and two layers of earthen embankment. The inner city is about 500 by 300 meters in size. The western part was probably being built first and then expanding to the east and south.

Two kilometers west of Dong Muang Aem, traces of a large ancient community can be seen on a mound in the Non Mueang Pheng area (โนนเมืองเพ็ง), measuring 500 meters wide and 1,200 meters long. The last community is located near Ban Kho Tha Pho (บ้านค้อท่าโพธิ์) in the Sa-at subdistrict of Nam Phong District, 500 meters southwest of Dong Mueang Aem, with a size of 600 meters in width and 2,300 meters long.

== Findings ==
The ancient ruins are situated on the roadside at the city's entrance, approximately 200 meters from the earthen walls. Bricks and laterite are found scattered throughout the site. A jar containing 8 different shapes of clay Buddha amulets was discovered by villagers in the early 2000s. Human bone fragments, tools made of bronze, and pottery have also been excavated.

In the inner city near the present-day Wat Sri Mueang Aem temple, a faded rectangular sandstone inscription measuring 30x78 centimeters was found in the ruin. It was inscribed three lines in Sanskrit using Pallava script, dating around the 6th - 7th century, reads, "...His Highness... whose name was known for his virtues from a young age, was given the name King Mahendravarman when he was enthroned. He built Shiva Linga(?) as a symbol of his victory..."

The site was pragmatically excavated by the Fine Arts Department in 1982 and the findings were then published in the book "Thai Archaeological Sites" (แหล่งโบราณคดีในประเทศไทย) Volume 3. All of the artifacts discovered in the area have been preserved at the local Wat Sri Mueang Aem Museum, which is managed by the Dong Mueang Aem Subdistrict Administrative Organization.
