= Chē Qú Kingdom =

Ancient kingdom in Cambodia and southern Vietnam

- 7th century
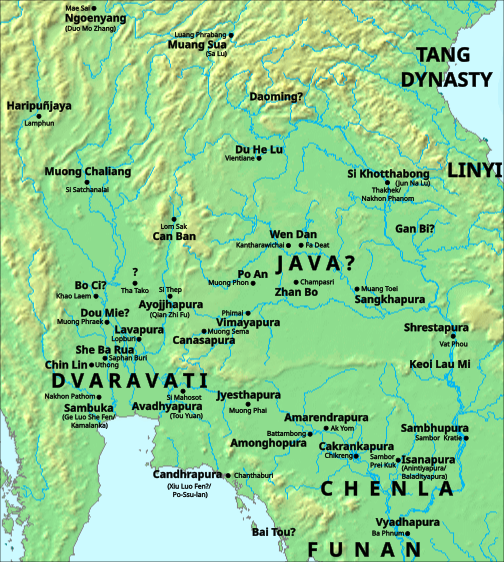
- Proposed locations of ancient kingdoms in Menam and Mekong Valleys in the 7th century based on the details provided in the Chinese leishu, Cefu Yuangui, and others.
- Government: Kingdom
- Historical era: Post-classical era
- Today part of: Cambodia; Vietnam

Chē Qú Kingdom (Chinese: 车渠国) was a polity named in a single Chinese notice, which places it to the south of Zhenla. The notice survives in the leishu Cefu Yuangui, compiled under the Song dynasty (960–1279), and nothing further is recorded of it.

== Chinese record ==
The sole known reference to Chē Qú is preserved in the Chinese encyclopedic compilation Cefu Yuangui, which records it in a geographical notice concerning Zhenla.

...真腊国，在林邑西南，本扶南国之属国也，去日南郡舟行六十日而至，南接车渠国，西有朱江国。...

...The Kingdom of Zhenla was located in the southwest of Linyi and was originally a vassal state of the Kingdom of Funan. It was 60 days’ boat ride away from Rinan County. It bordered the Kingdom of Chequ to the south and the Kingdom of Zhujiang to the west...

— Wang Qinruo and others of the Song Dynasty, Cefu Yuangui, volume 957

== Location ==
The notice fixes Chē Qú only in relation to Zhenla, so where it is placed depends on where Zhenla is placed. It has been put in the easternmost provinces of Cambodia, Ratanakiri, Mondulkiri and eastern Stung Treng, on the older view that early Zhenla lay along the Mekong lowland from Champasak in southern Laos down to Kratié in Cambodia.

That account of Zhenla's beginnings has since been questioned. Khmer inscriptions earlier than the 7th century cluster in central and southern Cambodia and the Mekong Delta, while southern Laos and north-western Cambodia carry Cham inscriptions instead. The Văt Luong Kău stele at Vat Phou names a 5th-century mahārājādhirāja, Śrī Devanika, whom George Cœdès connected with no Chenla line and whose inscription he judged closer in style to early Cham than to Funan or Chenla; he concluded that Champasak was not under Chenla in the 5th century and that its early centre must be sought further south. On the current reading that centre was Sambor Prei Kuk, in the lower Tonlé Sap basin. A Zhenla centred there would carry the ground to its south with it, and with that any placement of Chē Qú derived from the notice.
