= Zhū Jiāng Kingdom =

Ancient kingdom in central Thailand

- 7th–8th centuries
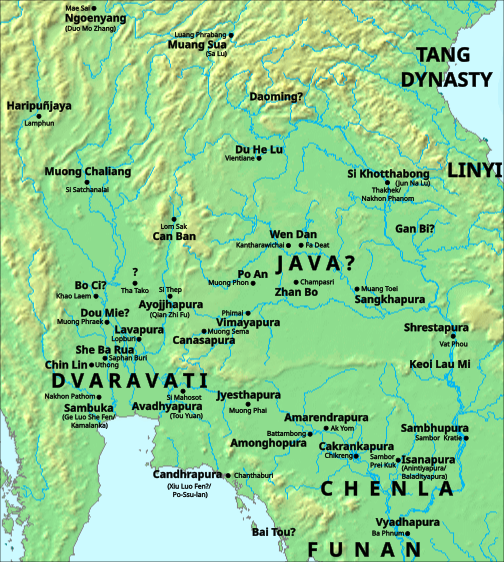
- Proposed locations of ancient kingdoms in Menam and Mekong Valleys in the 7th century based on the details provided in the Chinese leishu, Cefu Yuangui, and others.
- Religion: Buddhism
- Government: Kingdom
- Historical era: Post-classical era
  - Established: 7th century
  - First mentioned in a Chinese source: 7th century
  - Dvaravati sphere: 7th–9th-c.
- Today part of: Thailand

Zhū Jiāng Kingdom (Chinese: 朱江国; lit. 'country of red river') was an ancient kingdom known from the Chinese leishu Cefu Yuangui and the Book of Sui, which place it to the west of Zhenla. Where it lay is disputed, and the proposals run from the lower Chao Phraya to the Mun valley and the Irrawaddy basin.

== History ==
After Zhenla annexed Funan in 627, Zhū Jiāng, which has been identified as one of Dvaravati-influenced polities, and another kingdom, Cān Bàn, allied via royal intermarriage with Zhenla. They then fought several wars against Tou Yuan to the northwest. Tou Yuan later became a vassal of Dvaravati in 647. In addition, Zhenla also waged wars against Línyì to the northeast at the time mentioned. Tatsuo Hoshino reads the same period from the Book of Sui, which he takes to name Zhū Jiāng and Cān Bàn as the two states with which Zhenla was on friendly terms, against Línyì and Tuo Huan, that is Lavo, with which it was constantly at war.

== Location ==
In the Book of Sui Volume 82, says Zhū Jiāng was southwest of Linyi, west of Zhenla, which itself bordered the Kingdom of Chequ to the south.

...真腊国，在林邑西南，本扶南国之属国也，去日南郡舟行六十日而至，南接车渠国，西有朱江国。...

...The Kingdom of Zhenla was located in the southwest of Linyi and was originally a vassal state of the Kingdom of Funan. It was 60 days’ boat ride away from Rinan County. It bordered the Kingdom of Chequ to the south and the Kingdom of Zhujiang to the west...

— Wang Qinruo and others of the Song Dynasty, Cefu Yuangui, volume 957

Chinese historian Chen Jiarong (陳佳榮) proposes that Zhū Jiāng means a red river, referring to the Chao Phraya River in Thailand, and Zhujiang is another name for Duò Luó Bō Dǐ (墮羅鉢底國; Dvaravati) in its lower basin. In this case, Zhū Jiāng royal intermarried with Zhenla, and annexed Tou Yuan to the northwest, potentially leading the Old Book of Tang Volume 197 to assert that the Pyu Kingdoms bordered Zhenla to the east.

Hoshino gives the fullest form of the alternative reading. He suggests that the character jiāng (江), "river", may be corrupt, its left-hand radical being the same as that of bō (波), "wave", so that the toponym may in fact stand for Zhū Bō, an old name for the Pyu realm; on his account the Ping and Wang valleys appear to have fallen under its control from time to time, and the name was changed to Piao during the Tang. The New Book of Tang does state that Piao had formerly been known as Zhū Bō. Others likewise take Zhū Jiāng for a corrupted form of Zhū Bō (朱波), identified with the Pyu kingdoms in present-day Myanmar, or it might be some country that controlled the Irrawaddy River Basin, which was called by the Chinese the "Black Water Silt River" (黑水淤泥河). Its water is turbid and slightly red, so it is named the "Zhu River" (朱江). Some believe it was in the Mekong Basin, or the Mun Valley.
