= Mueang Fa Daet Song Yang =

Archaeological site in Thailand

Coordinates: 16°18′55″N 103°30′59″E

- เมืองฟ้าแดดสงยาง (Thai)
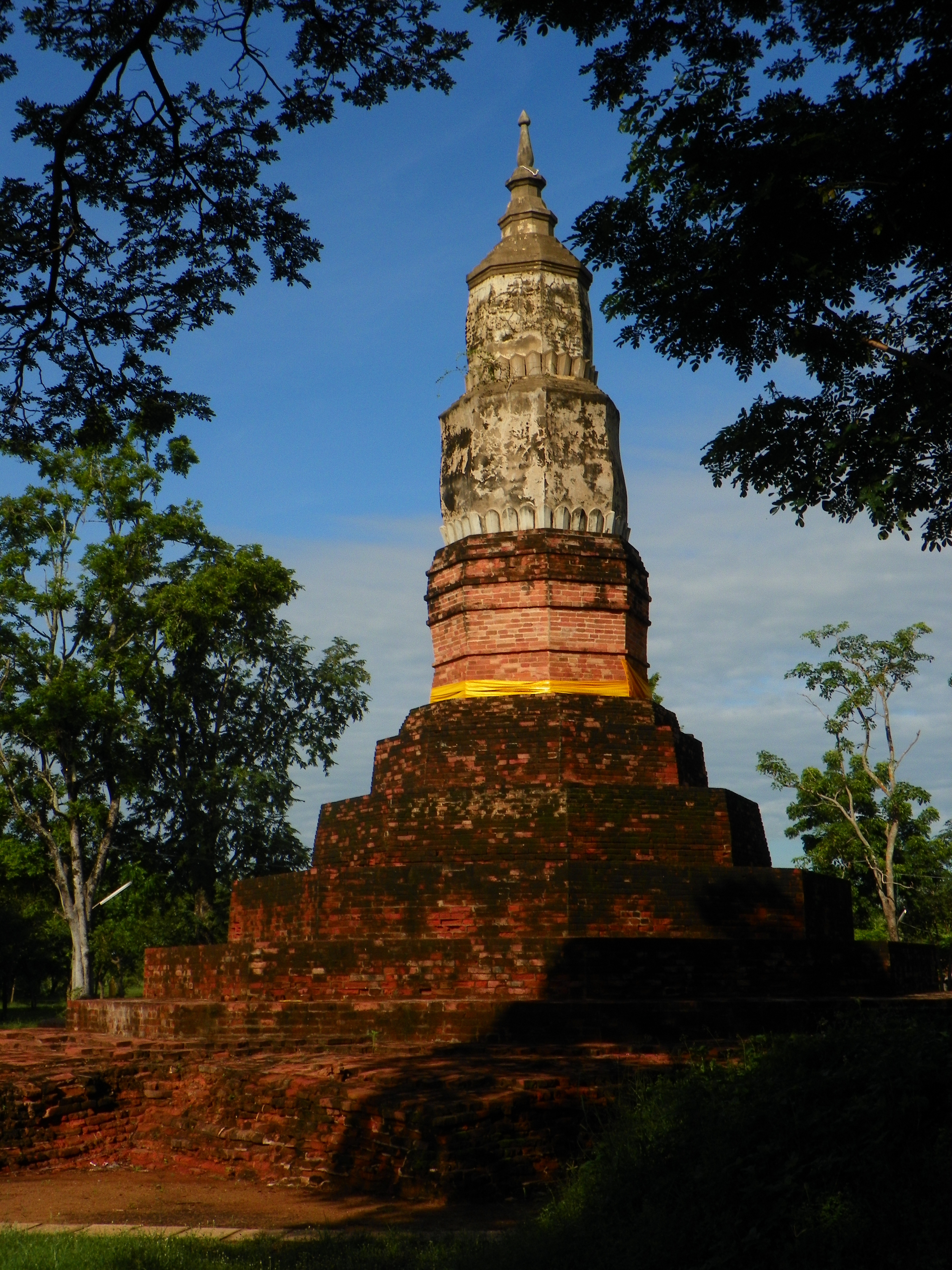
- Prataduyaku, the central Stupa, is characteristic of the Dvaravati architectural style integrated with Ayutthaya and Rattanakosin styles, dating back around the 7th-11th century CE.
- Interactive map of Mueang Fa Daet Song Yang
- Type: Human settlement
- Periods: Ancient history
- Cultures: Dvaravati; Ayutthaya; Rattanakosin
- Associated with: Mon people; Thai Isan people
- Location: Kamalasai district, Kalasin, Thailand

History
- Built: c. 621 AD
- Built by: Chao Fa Ra-ngum
- Abandoned: After 17th century AD

Site notes
- Area: 1.67 square kilometres (167 ha)
- Architectural styles: Dvaravati; Ayutthaya; Rattanakosin
- Excavation dates: 1968
- Condition: Partial restoration
- Owner: Public
- Management: Fine Arts Department, no entry fee
- Public access: Yes

Mueang Fa Daet Song Yang is a significant moated archaeological site in Northeast Thailand along the Pao River. The site is located in the Kamalasai district, Kalasin province on the Khorat Plateau with the Sakhon Nakhon basin to the north, and the Chi River system to the south. The site on Muang Fa Daed was also an excellent location for trade and transportation due to its proximity to multiple waterways. This site shows evidence of a large-scale Buddhist community and is often associated with the Davaravati culture based on the multitude of artifacts and features found at the site. The site was first excavated in 1968 and later by Phasook Indrawood in 1991, who dug nine test pits and found two phases of occupation. This region also indicated that agriculture was a large part of the lifestyle here. The site was thought to have been founded by Chao Fa Ra-ngum in 621 AD.

Mueang Fa Daet Song Yang was a supra-regional center of the Dvaravati civilization, together with Si Thep, Dong Mueang Aem, and others, but little known about its political structure. It could have previously been the center of an ancient kingdom.

== Landscape ==
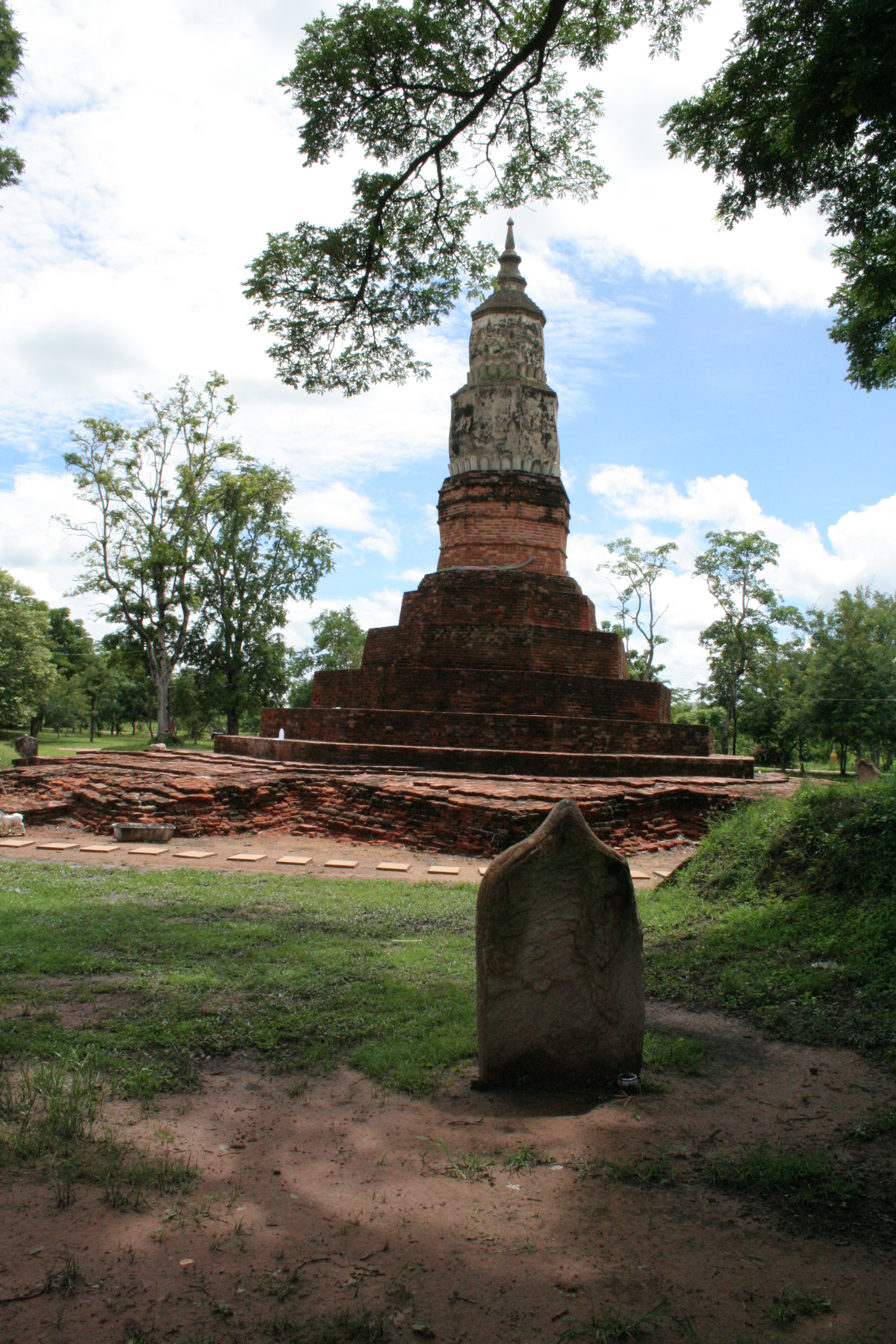
Prataduyaku Stupa

Located on the Pao River on the Khorat Plateau, it is south of the Sakhon Nakhon basin and north of the Chi River system. This site is located near multiple waterways making it an excellent location for rice farming. The access to nearby waterways also made it easier for trade among nearby communities.It is believed that there was a surplus of agriculture which was used to trade for stone and metal used in an abundance of buddhist art. The presence of the rivers nearby also contributed to the spread of ideas and practices such as the Buddhist religion. It was originally thought that the waterways may have provided protection for the people living in Mueang Fa Daet but the position of stupas outside of the moat may disagree with that. The location of the site seems to be well thought through, as its near river systems that could have been potentially utilized for transportation and trade. It can also be interpreted that there was a dynamic relationship between the monastery and the community nearby. The monastery may have gotten food and other donations from the community to sustain themselves. The landscape and layout of the site and settlement, especially the stupas outside the moats, also suggest that Buddhism moved into the site, and prior to this the moat was used to keep things out, as protection.

== Architecture ==
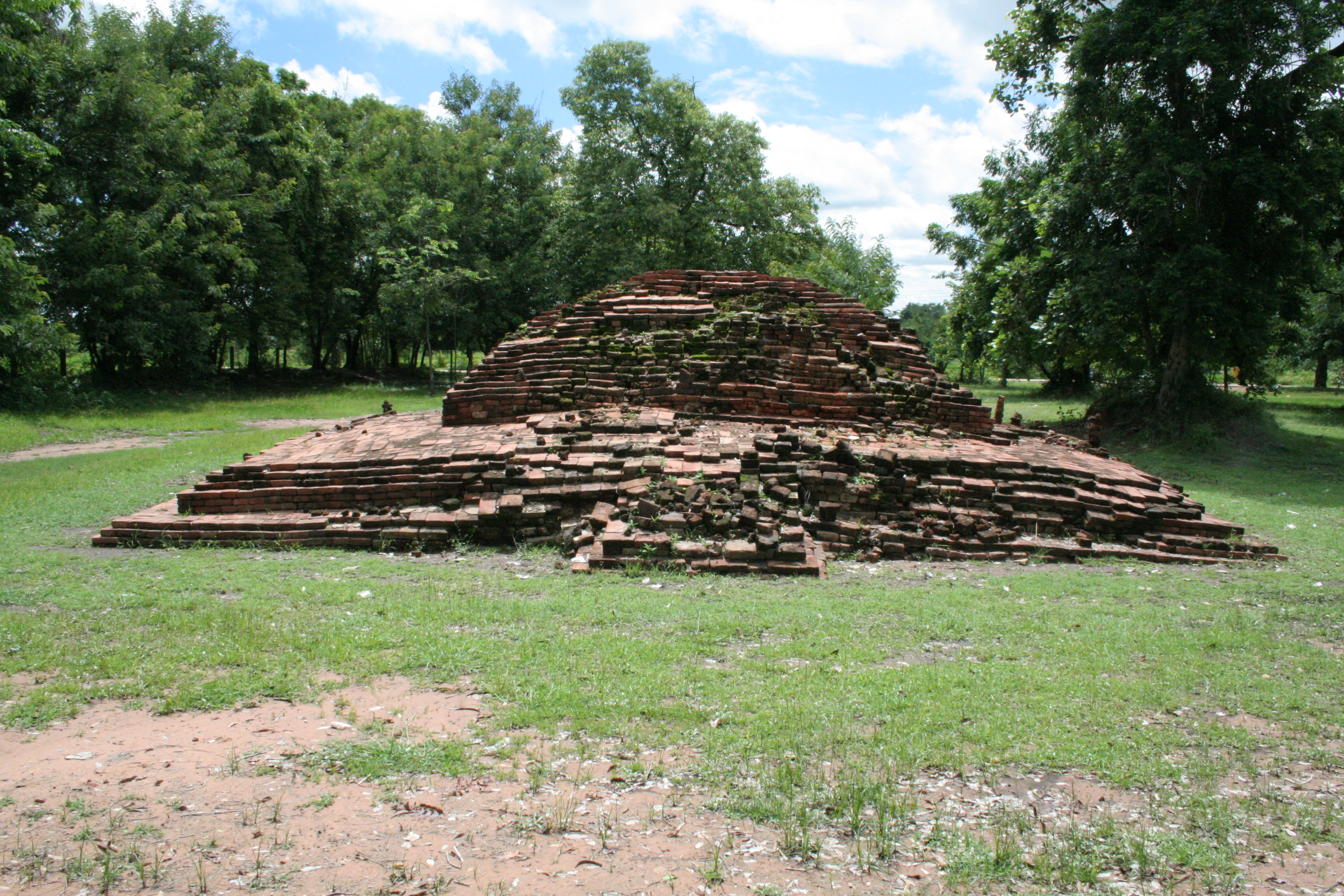
Brick stupa monument at Muang Fa Daed

Muang Fa Daet Song Yang is a moated monastery with a water reservoir, several scattered structures, and a large ceremonial center. The site is known for its architectural features, including large brick stupa bases (about 14), mounds, moats, and viharas. The site also features Dvaravati style architecture including an ubosot and over 170 sema stones, which are boundary markers that had religious scenes depicted on them. Pictorial semas with religious scenes reflecting Buddhism start to appear around the 9th to the 11th century. When looking at these mounds and structures and their placements, it is evident that there are no main or central habituation mounds present but just smaller ones. This suggests that there wasn't a big village present at the site that would have had economic or administrative centers, although it could have been a larger, sacred ceremonial center. More evidence pointing to this site being a monastery besides looking at the specific stupa bases are the numerous carvings and inscriptions found depicting Buddhist religious imagery with Dvaravati-style iconography. Some of these carvings included scenes from the Jatakas tales and the most famous scene is an image of Buddha side by side with Indra and Brahma. Across the Khorat Plateau and Chao Phraya Basin around this time, the early historical period, themes of Dvaravati ideologies, architecture, and sculptures can be found, as there was an increase of large ceremonial centers, changing the archaeological landscape.

== Cultural practices ==
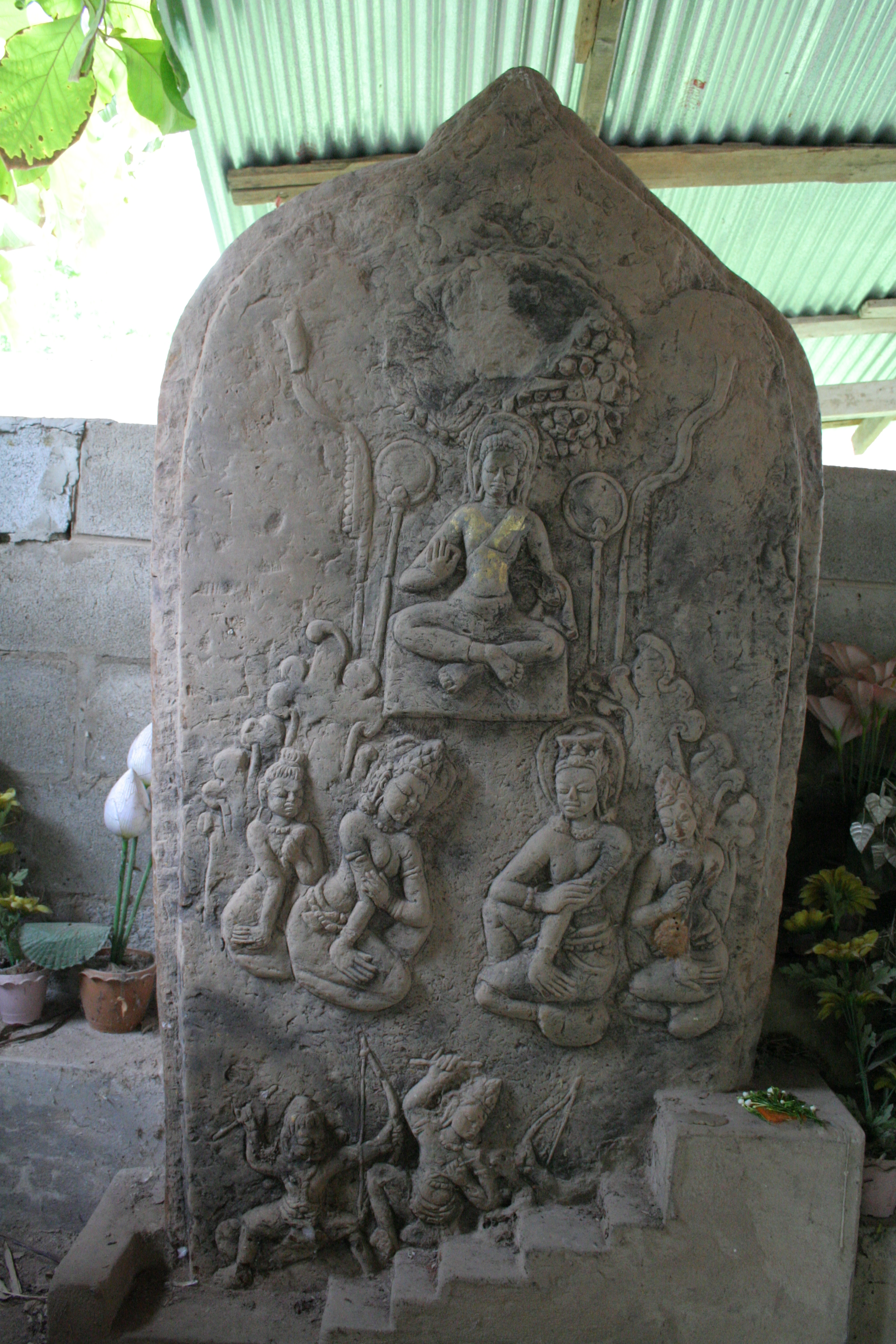
Sema stone recovered from Muang Fa Daed

The site of Muang Fa Daet was likely a Buddhist society based on the style of artifacts and features found there. The time period and style of ceramics and Buddhist artifacts found here link the culture to the Davaravati period based on its similarity to other Thailand Davaravati sites. With this site being a Buddhist society it is thought that there was a presence of Monks in the city. Based on the estimated population size there could have been as many as 85-164 men who could have taken on this role without disturbing the aspects of everyday life. The Khmer Empire is also thought to influence the culture and religious themes of Mueang Fa Daet as it spread throughout Thailand. The influence of the Khmer Empire can be seen in the specific pottery styles which included corded patterns, incised sherds, and carinated pots. There is also evidence that this site might have been a place of pottery production with large amounts of clay and remnants of a kiln left behind The narrative art found on many sema stones is also believed to have originated in Mueang Fa Daet. The appearance of narrative art sema stones is very limited with the site of Muang Fa Daed having the largest number with a total of 15.

== Contact and influences ==
It's evident that there is contact with others, as ideas, religions, and cultures flow and interacted within the site of Mueang Fa Daet Song Yang. Although there is not enough evidence to detect exactly where the spread of culture and where political power flows were taking place, there may be earlier evidence buried under the later Khmer period temples that are yet to be identified. The distribution of these sites can elude a lower population density during this time period and potentially unstable power centers. A disagreement in interpreting evidence from Muang Fa Daed lies in the discussion of outside contact and where it exactly came from, and theories vary based on the profession of the individual presenting evidence. One interpretation, from art historians, is that the links from the Khorat Plateau to outside contact were mainly the Chao Phraya River Valley in central Thailand, a place where the Dvaravati culture and styles thrived. Close connections were seen in Buddhist art and pottery styles (cord-marked) between the southwest Dvaravati culture and that of Mueang Fa Daet. Another interpretation taken by historians is that the epigraphic evidence presented points to Cambodia being their main outside source of contact. The evidence are texts found that are written in Sanskrit, the common language of Cambodia, rather than Pali, and they state connections to Chenla, a pre-Angkorian Khmer state.

== Mortuary rituals ==
=== Phases of occupation ===
When this site was excavated in 1991 it was discovered that there were two phases of occupation. The first phase took place during the so-called “iron age” and the second during the early Dvaravati period. The first phase was dated to around 300 BC-AD 200 determined from radiocarbon dating of charcoal samples from multiple burial sites. Burials found from this time period were extended burials placed on a western alignment and possessed no grave goods. The second phase was during the Dvaravati period which included burials in the primary and secondary burials. Both types of burials from this phase included burials graves with the primary ones including things such as pottery, bracelets, beads, etc. The secondary burials were unique in that they had boxes with bones and ashes inside.

=== Burials ===
There are two types of jar burials, primary and secondary burials, wherein primary burials consist of earthenware jars with enclosed human remains that include flesh and secondary burials have enclosed bones that have been defleshed. In northeast Thailand, specifically, the Mun and Chi valleys where the site is located, there is an abundance of these secondary jar burials. Excavations of the site Mueang Fa Deat Song Yang had many secondary jar burials that were on mounds and surrounded by moats and with them, they found iron slag. These indicators of the iron-smelting processes were found with the jars, which helps reinforce the chronology of the site, post-Iron Age. The jar burials that were excavated from Mueang Fa Daet Song Yang included bronze ornaments (bells, rings, and bracelets), iron implements, pottery vessels, and glass beads along with human bones and skulls. These are interpreted to be funerary gifts and offerings to the dead. The size and styles of the ceramic jars vary greatly, for example, some have a corded design and are finely baked, and some are more crudely fired. This gives insight to possible socio-cultural rituals or aspects of life that this monastery had. Their beliefs can be interpreted as well, as communities that typically practice this type of burial process put a value on the bones of their ancestors and see a connection with their bones and spirits. It is explained that families believe that their potential fortunes can depend on this burial ritual, as their relationship with their dead. Primary burials are thought to be dated to the 7th-11th century and secondary burials from the 12th-13th century.

== Site and excavation history ==
The first excavation of Muang Fa Daet took place in 1968 which exposed 14 monuments related to the Dvaravati period. These monuments included stupas and votive tablets that date back, in style, to the 7th-11th centuries which is when people are believed to have inhabited this area. Although there have been many findings at this site there has not been any evidence that it was a place of habitation during the Dvaravati period and didn't become inhabited until the Ayutthaya period. It wasn't until May 1991 that the site was investigated further by Phasook Indrawooth from the Silpakorn University. Indrawooth dug nine test pits total which revealed much more information about what life was like in Mueang Fa Daet. The first five test pits were larger revealing evidence of pottery production and included multiple burials and their grave goods. The last four test pits were smaller in size but exposed evidence of jar burials and cremation burials. The site is believed to be first occupied starting in 300 B.C. - 200 A.D and shows burial practices dated to around the 7th - 11th centuries for the jar burials and the 12th-13th century for cremation burials.
