= Dvaravati art =

Artistic work originating from Mon

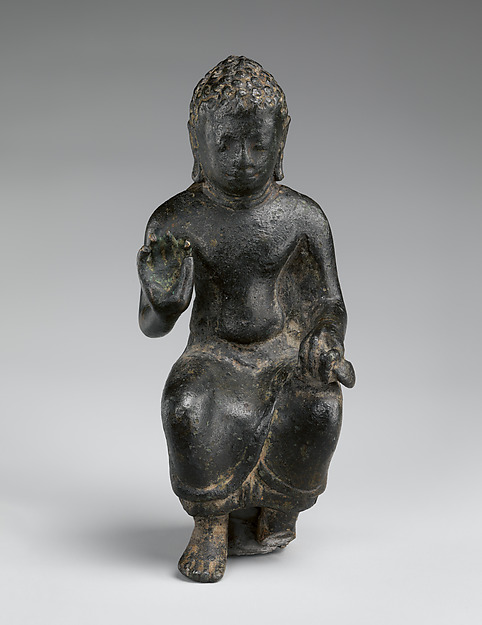
Bronze statue Mon-Dvaravati period.

Dvaravati art is a form of artistic work originating from ancient Mon. Dvaravati flourished from the Dvaravati Mon ancient artifacts are in present-day Thailand and Burma, Mon states to the west in southern Myanmar (Burma) and with the Mon state in northern Thailand. Dvaravati experienced political domination by neighbouring peoples on three occasions: in the 10th century, when the Burmese conquered the Mon state of Thaton west of the Tenasserim Yoma; from the 11th to the 13th century, in the late 13th century, when Dvaravati was absorbed by the Thai empire.

== History ==
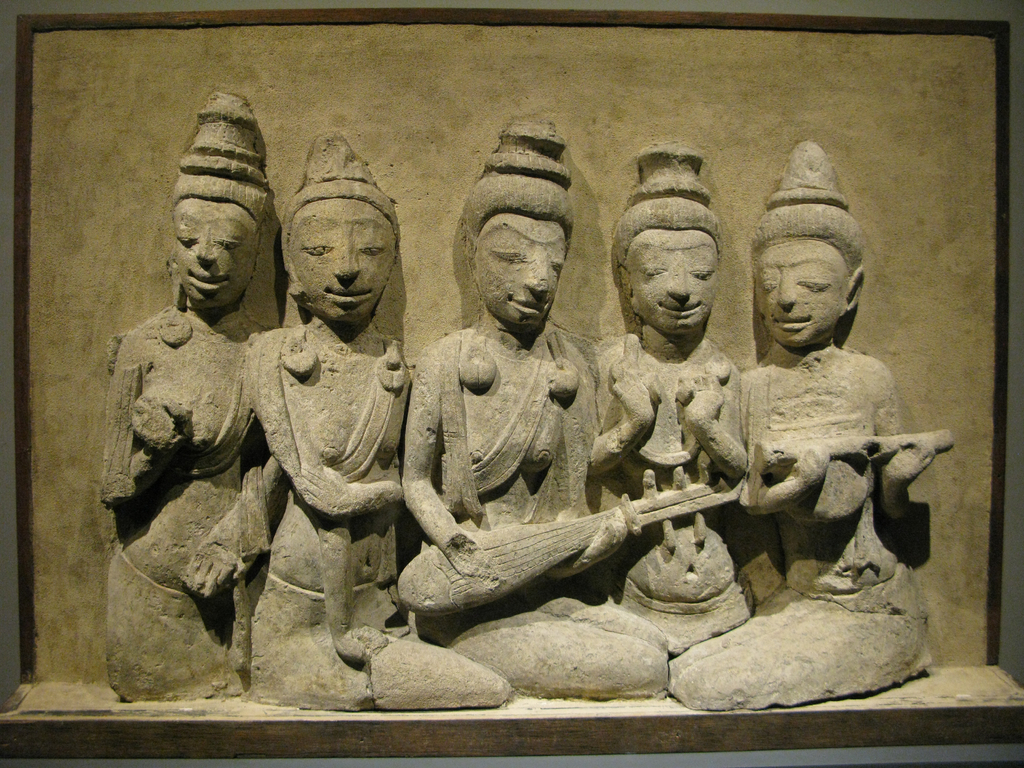
In Thailand now, Ku Bua, (Dvaravati culture, Mon), 650-700 C.E. Sculpture with influences from India. Three musicians in right are playing (from center) a 5-stringed lute, cymbals, a tube zither or bar zither with gourd resonator.

Dvaravati art came into form around the 6th century by the Mon communities as part of numerous minor kingdoms that existed in Thailand Now (Mon Land). Surrounding geography proved treacherous for travel and thus provided a fair amount of isolation for the individual kingdoms. Isolation enabled development of a highly sophisticated and distinct Mon-Dvaravati style.

=== Influence ===
Dvaravati itself was heavily influenced by Indian culture though the process of cultural diffusion over several centuries starting from the Christian 5th century, and played an important role in introducing Mahayana Buddhism and particularly Buddhist art to the region.

== Architecture ==
Archaeological research and restoration have indicated that Buddhist monuments of the Dvaravati style exhibited contemporary art of Gupta temple-architecture with many constructed with open-air structures. Chief among the architecture is the stupa style architecture.

There are four major categories:

1. chedi with terrace in each story
2. stupa with a square base

The central part of this is pointed in a finial way.

1. stupa with a square base and a central part

This form is shaped in an inverted alms-bowl. This form has numerous superimposed flat rings with a bulb terminal. Inspired by Mahayana Buddhism.

1. stupa with a square base and 5 terraces.

The lowest is the biggest terrace while the smallest is the top terrace. Each terrace has 3 niches in each of the four direction. Inside these 3 niches stand Buddha images.

The temple complex at Wat Phra That Hariphunchai, dating to the 9th and 11th centuries, is a pristine example of Dvaravati architecture. Phra Pathommachedi is a wat dating to the 12th century that exemplifies the architecture.

== Art ==
Various pottery excavated from former Dvaravati sites in central Thailand exhibit the sophistication and complexity of Dvaravati art.

Many Buddha statues were created with Dvaravati style. Some Buddha statues have mudras (hand positions) and others have katakahasta mudra (fingers folded down into palms, suggesting if it is holding something), both of which have evolved before 800 CE. Buddha statues are common artefacts.

=== Pottery ===
There are various kinds of Dvaravati pottery.

- Dish on stand;

These pots often have a polished reddish-brown colour with red or white alternating stripes.

- Carinated pot

these pots come in a variety of colours such as red, orange, brown, and black, although the top part of these vessels are plain.

- Shallow cup

These cups are used as lamps. They are made with a medium texture to a brown and gray finish. Most are handmade.

- Spouted bowl

These bowls are used as candles and often are coarse in texture with a black brown or shiny black in colour.

- Globular pot
- Jar with spout

There are two variations

== Museums ==
Artifacts have been collected over the years. Many pristine examples of artifacts can be found in Thai museums such as the Phra Pathommachedi National Museum in Nakhon Pathom city and the Prachinburi National Museum in Prachinburi, Prachinburi, Thailand.

== Gallery ==
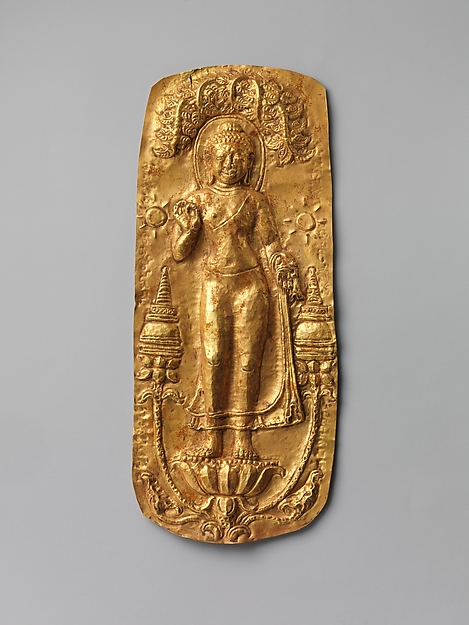
Gold plaque with Standing Buddha

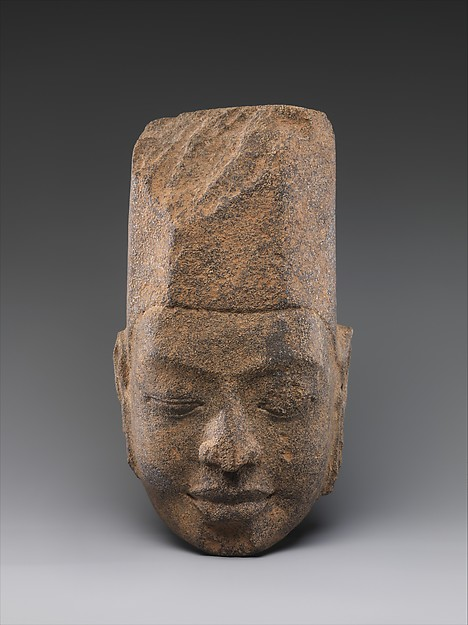
Head of Krishna

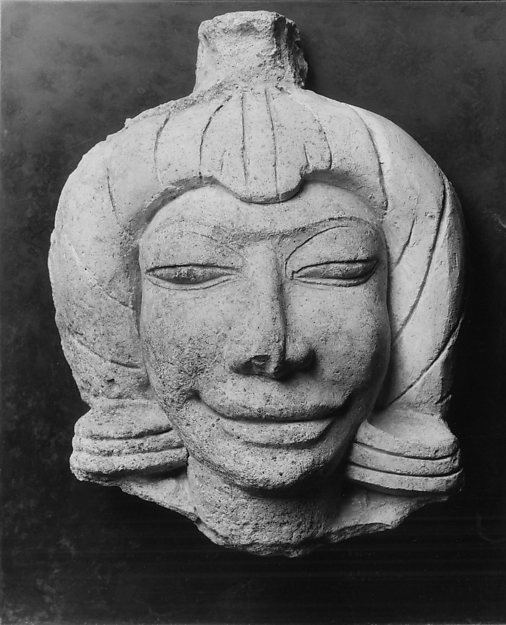
Head of a Male Figure

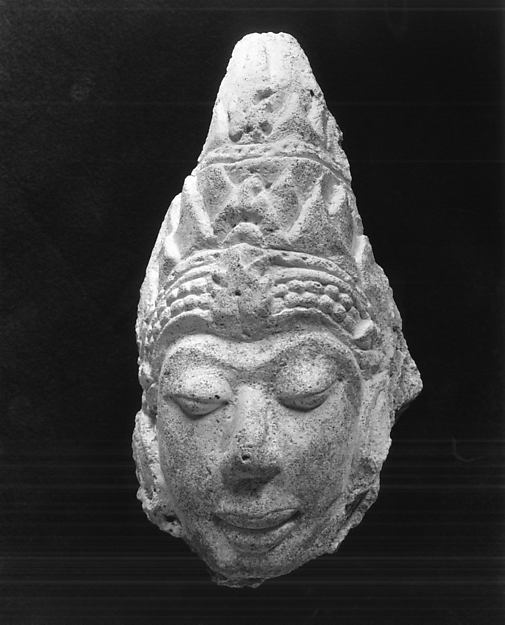
Head of a Male Deity

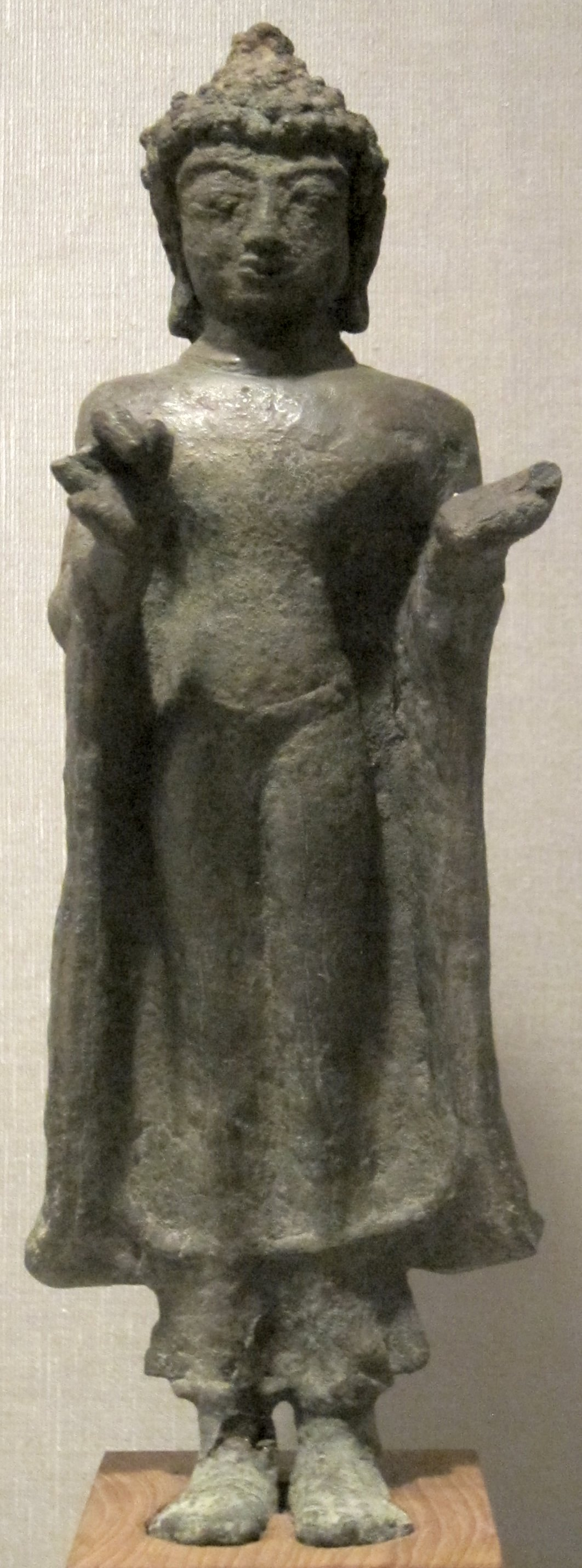
Bronze standing Buddha
