= Siam Confederation (Xiān) =

Term for polities of the lower Chao Phraya basin, 11th–14th centuries

Xiān 暹 (Chinese) Xiān
- c. 11th century – 1438
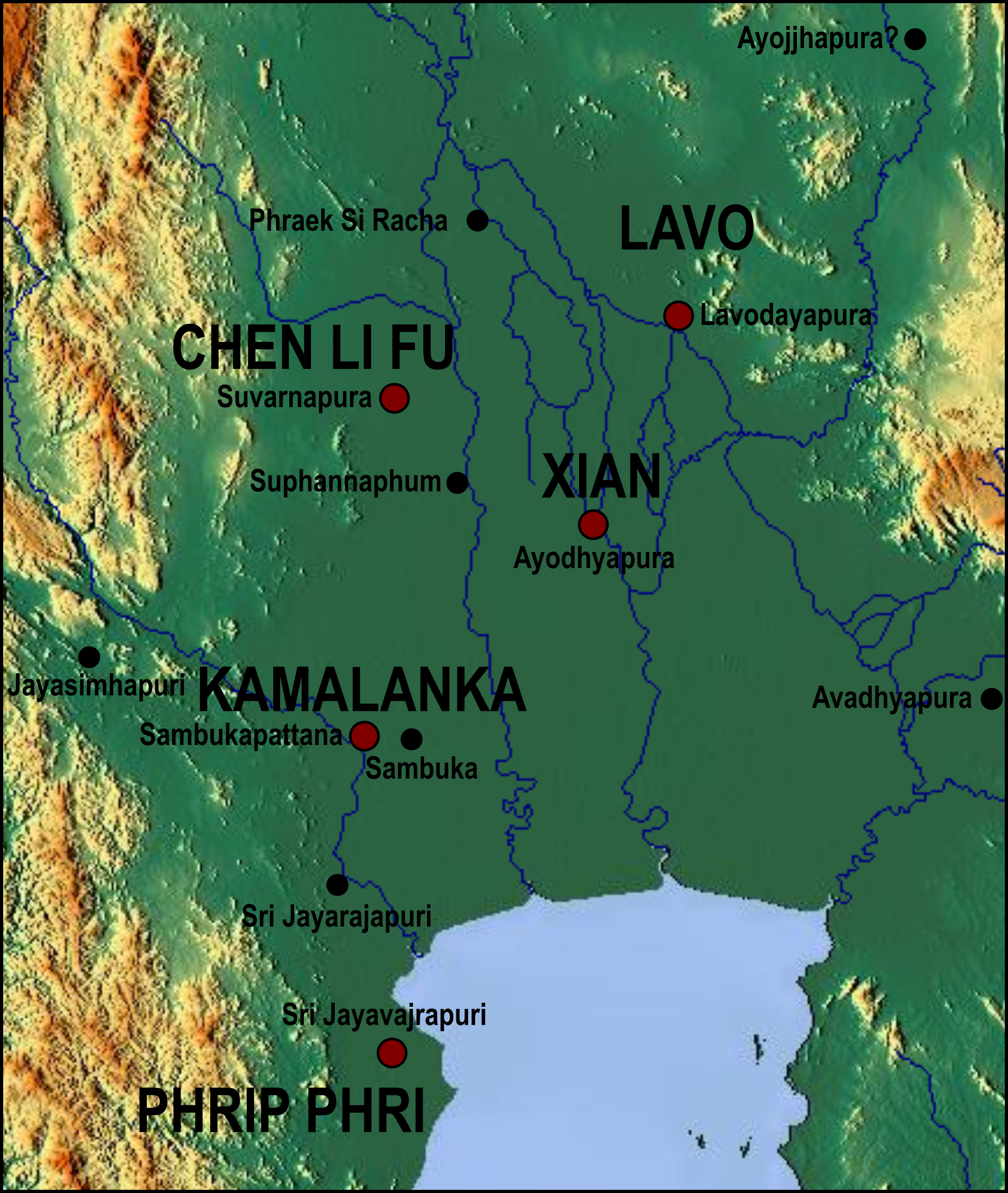
- The lower Menam (Chao Phraya) valley in the 13th century
- Capital: No single centre; see § Constituent polities
- Common languages: Old Mon; Old Thai
- Religion: Theravada Buddhism
- Government: City-state confederation (11th century–1351); Mandala federation (1351–1438)
- Monarch
- Historical era: Post-classical era
  - Earliest attestation of the name in Chinese records: 1178
  - First attestation in inscription as toponym/ethnonym: 611
  - First mention in Đại Việt sources: 1149
  - First tribute mission to the Yuan dynasty: 1292
  - Nakhon Si Thammarat reckoned as Siam: Late 13th century
  - Union with Lavo; founding of Ayutthaya: 1351
  - Suphannabhum and Sukhothai absorbed into Ayutthaya: 1438
Preceded by
Dvaravati
Syamapura
Siam city-states
Succeeded by
Ayutthaya Kingdom
- Today part of: Thailand; Malaysia; Myanmar

Xiān (Chinese: 暹), rendered in Thai as Siam (Thai: สยาม), is the name by which Chinese and Vietnamese records of the 12th to 14th centuries designated one or more polities in the lower Chao Phraya basin. Rather than a single centralised kingdom, Yoneo Ishii proposed that Chinese usage covered several maritime-oriented port polities around the present Bay of Bangkok, naming Ayodhya, Suphan Buri and probably Ligor. Phrip Phri sent embassies to the Yuan court in its own name, and Nakhon Si Thammarat was reckoned as Siamese from the late 13th century. These polities emerged on the western Chao Phraya plain after the decline of Dvaravati in the 11th century and are treated as successors of Qiān Zhī Fú at Si Thep and related states.

The identification of Xiān has been interpreted in different ways. Earlier scholarship equated the term with the Sukhothai Kingdom, an equation questioned since 1989 on the grounds that Chinese records list Xiān and Sukhothai separately. Some scholars instead identify the Xiān of the Chinese and Đại Việt records with Ayodhya, the later capital of the Lavo Kingdom, while others read it as a collective designation for several Siamese polities rather than any one of them.

Xiān entered into union with Lavo in 1351, an event associated with the founding of the Ayutthaya Kingdom with its seat at Ayutthaya. Phrip Phri was reduced to a frontier town governed from Suphan Buri, which was itself absorbed into Ayutthaya in 1438, while Nakhon Si Thammarat retained vassal status through the Ayutthaya and Thonburi periods, with brief intervals of independence, until it was reduced to a province of Rattanakosin in 1782.

== Name and terminology ==
The origin of the name Siam remains disputed. Its earliest form, syam, appears in Pre-Angkorian inscriptions of the 7th century, most probably as a toponym denoting a locality in the lower Chao Phraya basin.

=== Syam in Khmer and Cham inscriptions ===
During the period of intensified contact between Chenla and Dvaravati polities, including warfare and dynastic alliances under Isanavarman I and Bhavavarman II, syam appears four times in references to female slaves (ku syam: K. 557, dated 611 CE; K. 127, 683 CE; K. 154, 685 CE; and K. 904, 713 CE) and once in the name of a landholding official (pon syam) who endowed a temple with rice fields (K. 79, 639 CE). In K. 127, the entry preceding syam occupies the same syntactic position and reads vrau. Jenner takes vrau to refer to an ethnolinguistic minority, possibly ancestral to the modern Bru or Brau. On this parallel, syam may likewise have been a toponym extended to the people of the area. The term disappears from the inscriptions after the disintegration of Chenla in the 8th century.

Michael Vickery writes that syām appears in eight seventh century Khmer inscriptions as the “proper name of commoner workers.” Vickery warns it’s “erroneous to attribute any special group characteristics” to the seventh century occurrences of syām. He notes “Syam” remains a personal name in modern Cambodia. Vickery distinguishes the seventh century occurrence of the proper name “Syāṃ” from its later geographic usage.

The term recurs in a slave list in the Cham Po Nagar Inscription at Nha Trang, dated to 1050.

A later occurrence is found in the Cham inscription C.30 B1 at Po Nagar, dated to 1233/34 CE. In the slave lists of this kind Arlo Griffiths renders the term Siamese. He sets the name in a table of the peoples attested in two or more of the Khmer, Cam and Javanese corpora, in which every other name answers to a polity known from elsewhere.

Around the mid-12th century, it is found on a bas-relief at Angkor Wat depicting mercenaries of the Angkorian army labelled syam-kuk, perhaps meaning "of the land of Siam". The ethnolinguistic affiliation of these troops cannot be established with certainty, although many scholars have identified them as Siamese.

Despite earlier assumptions, modern scholarly consensus, such as Vittorio Roveda, B.P. Groslier, Saveros Pou, and Michael Vickery, is that the 12th century marching “Syam Kuk” depicted on Angkor Wat are not the Tai/Siamese (ethnic Thai). Vickery also rejects claims that “syām” is derived from the Sanskrit śyāma, meaning “dark” (as in “dark complexioned”). He instead documents the usage of Syam, Sien, Siam, and the Chinese Hsien by the Cham, Khmer, and Chinese to explain syām kuk doesn’t refer to an ethnicity but a geographic area, specifically the southern central plains of modern-day Thailand, that was mainly populated by the Mon-Khmer in the 12th century, not the Tai/Siamese.

=== Syam in the inscriptions of Pagan ===
From about 1120 onwards, syam occurs more than twenty times in Old Mon and Burmese inscriptions at Pagan. One instance attaches to Saṁbyaṅ, an Old Mon title for a senior official, but the term appears chiefly in lists of temple slaves of both sexes. Some Syaṁ are distinguished by occupation, as dancers, weavers or carpenters.

=== Syam in Old Javanese sources ===
Canto 15.1 of the Old Javanese Deśawarṇana, better known as the Nagarakertagama, names the Siamese of Ayodhya, together with Dharmanagari, Marutma, Rajapura, Singhanagari, Champa, Cambodia and Annam, among the constant friends of the Javanese court. Theodore Pigeaud read syangkayodhyapura ... dharmanagari as three names, Syangka for Siam, Ayodhyapura for Ayutthaya and Dharmanagari for Ligor, and took syangka to be the Syam of the mid-11th-century Cham inscription and of the 13th-century Khmer inscriptions, with the Sanskrit suffix -ka. Stuart Robson instead separated syangka from ayodhyapura, reading the first as the people or the country as a whole and the second as a particular place, and restored syangka before dharmanagari, where the conjunctive kimuta stands in its place. Ishii took Robson's reading to show that Xiān could cover Ayodhya and Ligor alike.

=== Chinese, Vietnamese and Pali forms ===
Chinese sources render the name as Xiān (暹); after the union with Lavo the compound Xiānluó hú (暹羅斛) appears, later shortened to Xiānluó (暹羅). An earlier form, San-lo (三濼), recorded in the Lingwai Daida of 1178, is held to be an early attempt to transcribe the name of the country or people of the upper and central Chao Phraya, which Khmer inscriptions called Syam.

Vietnamese sources write the name with the same graph, rendered in Vietnamese as Xiêm and in its extended form as Xiêm La, which remained the usual Vietnamese name for Siam into the modern period. The Đại Việt sử ký toàn thư uses the compound 暹羅 in its entries for 1149, 1182, 1241 and 1360, and the phrase 暹人 ("people of Xiān") in the entry for 1313. The record of tribute presented during the Ai Lao campaign of 1335 has "country of Xiān" (暹國).

In the Jinakalamali, a Pali chronicle of the northern Thai principality of Lan Na, the forms siam-desa and siam-rattha denote the "region (desa)" or "state (rattha)" of Siam; one passage identifies this with the Sukhothai region.

== Identification and historiography ==
Prince Damrong proposed in 1914 a unilinear scheme of Thai history in which the history of the Thais in Siam proper began with the founding of the Sukhothai Kingdom in 1238, succeeded in turn by Ayutthaya, Thonburi and Rattanakosin. The scheme became standard in Thai school textbooks. For the period before Ayutthaya, Damrong relied on the Chinese dynastic annals, which Khun Chenchin'aksorn (Sudchai) translated for him and which he published as phak 5 of the Prachum Phongsawadan. His other body of evidence was the Sukhothai inscriptions, edited by Cœdès in 1924. The identification of 暹國 as Sukhothai was the translator's, and Cœdès accepted it and carried it into his The Indianized States of Southeast Asia. (Note: Ishii cites E. Thadeus Flood for serious mistranslations in that translation.) On this model, Xiān in Chinese records was taken to mean Sukhothai.

The equation was contested in 1989 by Yamamoto Tatsuro, who found in the Dade Nanhai-zhi (1297–1307) the entry 暹國管 上水速孤忒 and took 速孤忒 for the Yuán Shǐ transcription of Sukhothai. A name standing as the object of 管, "control", cannot denote the same place as its subject 暹, so Xiān was a polity politically superior to Sukhothai rather than Sukhothai itself. The decisive evidence is that Chinese records of 1297 and 1299 list Xiān and Sù gǔ chí (速古漦, Sukhothai) as separate tributaries, which indicates that the lower Chao Phraya basin then held at least three distinct polities: Lavo, Sukhothai and Xiān. Subsequent studies have accordingly rejected the proposition that Sukhothai was the first independent Siamese polity.

Beyond this negative conclusion there is no settled positive identification. Yoneo Ishii treated Xiān as a confederation of port polities on the Bay of Bangkok, whereas Chris Baker and Pasuk Phongpaichit identify the Xiān of the Chinese and Vietnamese records with Ayodhya, the relocated capital of Lavo, since the Chinese court used the same name for Ayutthaya afterwards. They rest the case on two features of the record, that the court listed Xiān among maritime kingdoms and that the Dade Nanhai-zhi has Xiān controlling Sukhothai, and allow that the Chinese may first have used the name for somewhere else. Other proposals point to Suphannabhum, on the strength of Hongwu-era tribute missions sent in the name of the king of Su-men-bang (蘇門邦), identified with Suphanburi. Baker and Pasuk report a separate Suphan Buri proposal, resting on other grounds, and reject it as unevidenced. Charnvit Kasetsiri, reported by Vickery, takes the 14th-century Chinese Xiān to name the lower Menam basin as a whole, Ayutthaya included, rather than Sukhothai.

Ishii's own ground is the variety in the names under which tribute arrived, the same series being recorded from the country of Xiānluó hú, from its king, from its crown prince, and from the crown prince as king of Su-men-bang. He drew a parallel from Sumio Fukami, who argued that Chinese Sanfoqi (三佛齊) may have covered either one port polity of the Strait of Malacca or all of them together. Ishii concluded that a Chinese name for a "barbarian country" need not denote a single place.

== Attestations in Chinese and Vietnamese records ==
Tribute brought a local ruler access to trade with China together with political recognition. The court had operated the system from 240 CE, and between 600 and 850 it received 110 missions from thirty-four named places in Southeast Asia, half of which sent only one.

=== Possible early references ===
Two earlier notices have been connected to the region, though neither uses the name Xiān.

During the early Tang dynasty a polity called Xiū Luó Fēn, said to lie west of Chenla, sent tribute to the Chinese court. It is described as commanding large forces and as having customs broadly similar to those of Gē Luó Shě Fēn, which Thai scholars have identified either with Dvaravati-period Nakhon Pathom or with Sambuka of the Bhavavarman II inscription.

The San-lo (三濼) of the Lingwai Daida (1178) has been read by Thai scholars as a reference to the new centre of Chaliang at Sawankhalok.

A much later text, the Shū yù zhōu zī lù of 1583, asserts retrospectively that the kingdom to which the Sui dynasty sent an embassy between about 605 and 618 — Chi Tu — had by then already been renamed Xiān. Written nearly a millennium after the events it describes, the passage is of limited evidentiary value, but it is notable for pairing Xiān and Lavo in the same contrast of terrain that appears in earlier sources:

暹古名赤土, 羅斛古名婆羅剎也. 暹國土瘠不宜耕種, 羅斛土田平衍而多稼.
The ancient name of Xiān is Chì Tǔ, and the ancient name of Luó Hú is Póluó Shā. The land of Xiān is poor and unsuited to cultivation, while the fields of Luó Hú are level and abundantly cropped.

— Yán Cóng-jiǎn (严从简), Shū yù zhōu zī lù, chapter 8: Zhenla

=== Xiān in Yuan-period records ===
Xiān first appears in the Yuán Shǐ (元史) under 1278, when the Yuan dynasty dispatched He Zi-zhi (何子志), a commander of ten thousand households, as envoy to Xiān; the mission was detained by Champa. The Yuán Shǐ records that the party never arrived: it was seized while passing Champa, and He Zi-zhi, Huang Fu-jian and more than a hundred companions were put to death there early in 1283. The same source preserves the deliberation that preceded the mission, in which the minister Jia-lu Na-da-si argued that these were small countries whose conquest would bring little advantage and that envoys should be sent before any resort to arms. Ishii gives the year of the dispatch as 1282 rather than 1278, and, following E. Thadeus Flood, treats the deliberation as undated and falling between those two years. Xiān appears on the list of territories Kublai Khan intended to subdue after the completion of the Mongol conquest of China in 1279, together with Lavo and polities of the Malay Peninsula, Sumatra, South India and Ceylon.

A first tribute from Xiān is recorded on 26 November 1292, when a golden missive (金冊) issued by the chief of the country reached the capital by way of the Pacification Office of the Guangdong Circuit. The court sent envoys to press for submission the following year, which Xiān refused, and a further imperial summons was issued in 1294. That order allowed that, if the king could not come, his sons, brothers and vassal-retainers should present themselves as hostages. In 1295 the king of Xiān, Gan-mu-ding (Kamrateng, กมรเต็ง) of Pi-ch'a-pu-li (Phrip Phri; present-day Phetchaburi), appeared at court in person bearing tribute and a golden plate. (Note: The same style is borne by the rulers of Chen Li Fu, from which O. W. Wolters inferred that the polity was a Khmer dependency, and by a ruler named in an inscription of 1183 at Chaiya as Kamrateng An Maharaja Sri Mat Trailokyaraja Mauli Bhusanavarmadeva. Chit Phumisak read Kamrateng An there as the Angkorian designation for the governor of a subject city rather than for a sovereign. Whether the title marks subordination in every case is disputed; the question is set out at Chen Li Fu § Relations with Angkor. Walailak Songsiri reads the style as court usage taken up from the Khorat Plateau and the Tonlé Sap for formal address to the Chinese court, noting that the Chinese records give it to the rulers of Sukhothai, Phrip Phri and Chen Li Fu alike while the more than sixty settlements dependent on Chen Li Fu had rulers of their own who did not bear it.) Tribute followed again in 1296, and envoys from Xiān, Luó hú (羅斛, Lavo) and Jambi (Srivijaya) are recorded in 1297. In 1295, having received the submission of both parties, the court issued an edict directing Xiān to do no harm to Ma-li-yu-er (Melayu), with whom it had long been at war. In 1299 the king of Xiān asked for the horse trappings, white horse and gold-threaded robe granted in his father's lifetime; the minister Wan-ze Da-la-han advised that giving horses to so small a kingdom would invite criticism from its neighbours, and only the robe was sent. Further missions came in 1300, in April and July 1314, in 1319, and lastly in 1323.

The Dade Nanhai-zhi (大德南海志) of 1304 states that Xiān controls Shang-shui Sù gū tè (暹國管 上水速孤忒), Sù gū tè being Sukhothai. What Shang-shui stands for is undecided: Baker and Pasuk leave it as either a further place name or a statement that Sukhothai lay upriver from Xiān, and note that the same word recurs, equally undecided, in Ma Huan's account of a quarter of Ayutthaya holding five or six hundred foreign families. Yamamoto took the notice to mean that Sukhothai was under Xiān's control, while the Thai scholar Keatkhamjorn Meekanon suggests instead that Sukhothai depended on Xiān for access to export markets.

Xiān also appears in the biography of Chen Yi-zhong in the Song shi, which records that in the nineteenth year of the Zhiyuan era (至元, 1282–83) the imperial army attacked Champa and that Chen fled to Xiān, where he died. Chen Yi-zhong was a defeated minister of the Southern Song who had sought refuge in Champa; his onward flight has been taken to indicate that Xiān was a flourishing commercial port in the post-Srivijayan trade order, with a resident community of compatriots. About two hundred Song refugees had reached the gulf in 1282 and a Chinese mission was sent to Xiān to recover them, and Baker and Pasuk read the two episodes together as showing that Xiān was by then a known place of refuge.

=== Xiānluó hú and Xiānluó ===
Accounts dated 1349 run both ways. The Daoyi Zhilüe records that in the fifth month of that year Xiān sent an envoy with a gold-lettered memorial to submit to Luó hú (Lavo), and the Ming shi that Luó hú afterwards grew strong and took its land. Another notice of the same year has Xiān bring Luó hú to submission, a discrepancy Baker and Pasuk attribute to copying error. Either way the date is consistent with the founding of Ayutthaya through the union of Lavo with Siamese Suphan Buri. Chinese records name the resulting polity Xiānluó hú (暹羅斛), later shortened to Xiānluó (暹羅). It sent 41 tribute missions during the Hongwu era, 33 under the former name and the remainder under the latter.

On the practice itself, Walailak Songsiri describes missions as customarily sent once in three years, though in practice attempted almost every year, and as a trade-state form, an acknowledgement of submission made for the convenience of trade at the southern ports, serving the court and the merchants alike, and known in Thai as chimkong (จิ้มก้อง). She notes that the Chinese records class these Chao Phraya city-states throughout as Nan Man (หนานหมาน), the southern barbarians. On her account the polity the Chinese called Chen Li Fu belongs to the period before Xiān enters the record.

Walailak Songsiri reads the pair of names as marking a division on the ground. On her account Chinese usage of the Yuan period applied Xiān to the western side, from Sukhothai and Suphannabhum through Ratchaburi and Phrip Phri as far as Nakhon Si Thammarat, and Luó hú to the eastern side.

=== Đại Việt records ===
Xiān and other countries paid tribute to Đại Việt during the Trần dynasty campaign against Ai Lao of 1334–1336, as recorded in volume 9 of the Khâm định Việt sử Thông giám cương mục. The Đại Việt sử ký toàn thư mentions Xiān on five further occasions under the Lý and Trần dynasties.

References to Xiān in the Đại Việt sử ký toàn thư
Year	Reign	Original text	Summary
1149	Lý Anh Tông	己巳十年〈宋紹興十九年〉春二月, 爪哇、路貉、暹羅三國商舶入海東, 乞居住販賣, 乃於海島等處立庄, 名雲屯, 買賣寳貨, 上進方物.	Merchants from Xiān (暹羅) and other countries reached Hǎidōng (海東) and sought permission to trade and to establish a trading post at Yún tún (雲屯).
1182	Lý Cao Tông	暹羅國來貢.	Xiān came to pay tribute.
1241	Lý Cao Tông	暹羅、三佛齊等國商人入雲屯鎮, 進寳物, 乞行買賣.	Merchants from Xiān, Srivijaya and other countries came to Yún tún with goods and requested permission to trade.
1313	Trần Anh Tông	時占城被暹人侵掠, 帝以天覷經畧乂安、臨平徃救. 後凣西邉籌畫, 明宗悉以委之.	Xiān raided Champa; the emperor sent forces to Champa's aid. (Note: The fighting is said to have lasted two years.)
1360	Trần Dụ Tông	冬十月, 路鶴、茶哇哇音鴉、暹羅等國商舶至雲屯販賣, 進諸異物.	Merchants from Xiān arrived at Yún tún to trade.

== Geography and economy ==
The Daoyi Zhilüe describes Xiān as ringed by high mountains and deep valleys and as occupying poor land, so that its people depended on neighbouring Luó hú (Lavo) for rice and supported themselves by commerce. The same work states the dependence from the other side in its entry on Lavo, whose paddy fields it calls level and well watered and on which it says the people of Xiān rely. Ishii read that entry's report of salt boiled from sea water as placing Lavo on the coast at some point. The Ming shi-lu preserves the same contrast, recording that Xiān was later divided into two countries, Lavo and Xiān, and that the barren soil of Xiān left it dependent on Lavo's level plain for supplies; Baker and Pasuk attribute the poor soil to the marshy and saline conditions of the lower delta, noting Ma Huan's report of 1433 that the land was wet and swampy. Zhou Daguan, who travelled to Zhenla in 1296–1297, places Xiān to the south-west of Chenla.

Ayodhya, one of the constituent centres, stood in the middle of the lower Chao Phraya deltaic floodplain; before modern drainage works the monsoon turned the city into what has been described as an island in the middle of a sea. The Chinese court included Xiān among the "maritime" kingdoms from which it demanded submission.

The Xin Yuanshi describes how rice was grown in the valley. A large river runs from Xiān through Lavo to the sea, and each summer sea water pushed up into its inland reaches; farmers sowed at that season and the seedlings rose with the water, a foot of growth for every foot the river rose, ripening as it fell. Seed was sown but the ground was not ploughed, which the account gives as the reason grain was abundant and cheap. The same source states that Xiān and Lavo had both formed part of Funan.

Exports listed in the Daoyi Zhilüe (1351) include sappanwood, tin, chaulmoogra, ivory and kingfisher feathers.

== History ==
=== Decline of Dvaravati ===
The Xiān city-states took shape in about the 11th century, following the collapse of Qiān in the late Dvaravati period. That collapse has been attributed to a combination of pressures: the conquest of the Chao Phraya valley and the upper Malay Peninsula by King Sujita of Tambralinga in the mid-9th century, invasion from the east by Angkor, and the Pagan incursion into the valley around the mid-11th century. Together these are held to account for the decline of the earlier states of the region. Baker and Pasuk set a material cause beside these. Several towns founded in the 6th century declined or were abandoned from the late 9th, and at U Thong the river shifted, cutting the town off from easy access to the gulf, so that its people may have moved some 30 kilometres north-east to Suphan Buri, while new towns appeared along the Suphan and Tha Chin and on the Mae Klong. An earlier disturbance in the same area has been proposed for the 8th century. Hiram Woodward, placing Si Thep within the polity known to the Tang court as Wen Dan, suggests that Si Thep may then have exercised some control over Lopburi, Nakhon Pathom, U Thong and Khu Bua in the lower Chao Phraya basin, and asks whether central Dvaravati should be understood as having pre- and post-Wen Dan phases; he presents this as a possibility rather than a finding.

The region, along with Junk Ceylon (Phuket) and Tambralinga, was raided by the Mau Shans of the Shan States during their Indochina campaign between 1220 and 1230.

=== Regional ruling lines of the Menam valley ===
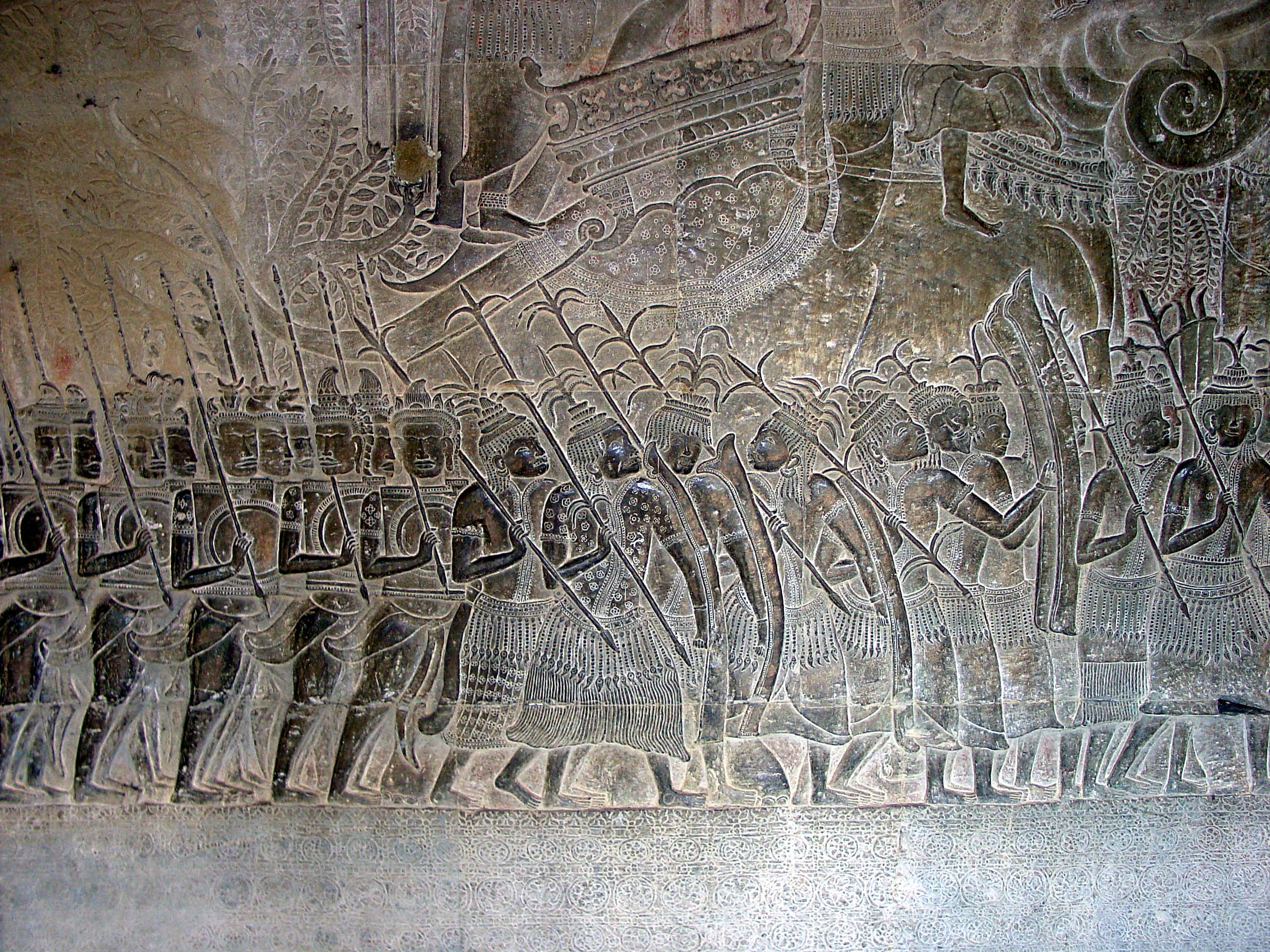
The consensus of modern scholars is that the 12th century marching “Syam Kuk” on Angkor Wat aren't the Tai/Siamese (ethnic Thai). Michael Vickery documents the usage of Syam, Sien, Siam, and the Chinese Hsien by the Cham, Khmer, and Chinese to explain syām kuk doesn’t refer to an ethnicity but a geographic location, specifically the southern central plains of modern Thailand that was populated by the Mon-Khmer in the 12th century..

Later traditions and epigraphy describe several regional ruling lines emerging in the Menam valley during the 12th century. After Sri Dharmasokaraja I moved to Nakhon Si Thammarat in 1117, readings of the Dong Mè Nang Mưo'ng Inscription (K.766) state that his successor Sri Dharmasokaraja II recovered Lavo in 1157 and extended his authority north towards present-day Nakhon Sawan, and sought to retain the allegiance of Dhanyapuri, which is also named in the inscription. The inscription is dated 1167, and 1168 in some readings.

Later traditions likewise describe rulers of the lower western Menam valleys moving north and returning. The Ayutthaya Testimonies place Jatiraja (ชาติราชา) at Mueang Sing, with Pra Poa Noome Thele Seri succeeding him around 1150. Du Royaume de Siam has Pra Poa Noome Thele Seri going from Tasoo Nacora Louang to Locintai in 1188/89, while the Instructions Given to the Siamese Envoys Sent to Portugal (1684) give the move as from Yassouttora Nacoora Louang to Soucouttae and supply no date; the destination has been placed in the Nakhon Thai–Sukhothai region. He and his younger brother Uthong I are then described as returning to the lower Menam valley, where the younger, who was from Chaliang, took the throne of Suphannabhum. Another monarch, Suryaraja, is placed at Kamphaeng Phet in the same period. His line expanded northward instead and formed alliances with Tai chiefdoms, later associated with the political formation conventionally identified as the Sukhothai Kingdom.

The Nakhon Si Thammarat Chronicle similarly records fighting in the lower valleys and Sri Dharmasokaraja's extension of authority over Menam polities. Although it calls him ruler of Nakhon Si Thammarat, it places him at an unnamed northern seat. After the riverine powers recovered these territories, he withdrew south to Nakhon Si Thammarat; they pursued him down the Malay Peninsula in the 1190s, ending in a negotiated settlement near present-day Prachuap Khiri Khan.

=== Tai, Xiān and Angkorian interactions ===
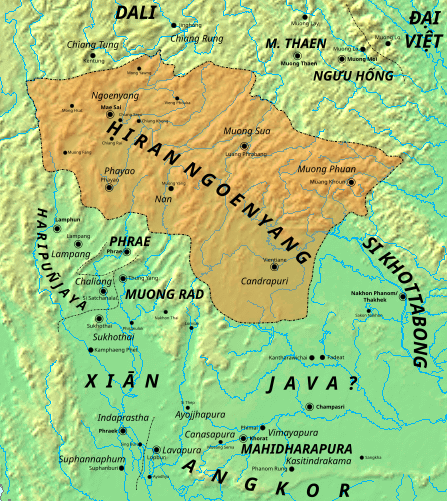
Approximate greatest extent of Tai Yuan Ngoenyang following Chueang's southern campaign in the 1150s.

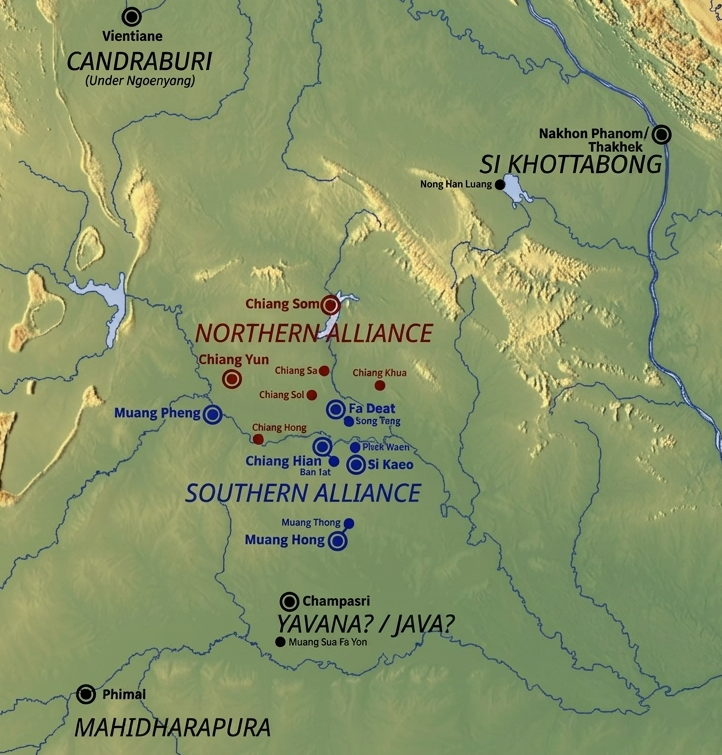
Interpretive reconstruction of the political network described in the Tamnan Fa Daet Song Yang, showing the Northern Alliance led by Muang Chiang Som (brown), the rival Southern Alliance led by Muang Fa Daet (blue), and neighboring contemporary polities (black).

The nine-year contest between the Angkorian claimants Jayavirahvarman of the Phimai region and Suryavarman I of the eastern and northeastern territories ended in Suryavarman's victory in 1010. He is said to have campaigned against several cities in the Phimai region and then taken over polities in the Preah Vihear region associated with the Mahidharapura clan, forcing the lineage northward. Its destination is disputed; some scholars propose present-day Sakon Nakhon, citing a large triangular moated settlement with Angkorian-period artefacts and Mahidharapura-era remains.

The Mahidharapura line may subsequently have encountered a Tai Lueang (ไทเลือง) polity and married into its ruling house. An inscription records the Tai prince Pha Mueang marrying Sukhara Mahadevi, a Mahidharapura princess often identified as a daughter of Jayavarman VII. The Tai Lueang lineage also became connected to the northern Xiān polity of the Menam basin through the marriage of Pha Mueang's sister Nang Sueang to Si Intharathit, then governor of Mueang Bang Yang, identified with present-day Nakhon Thai. The lineage is also associated with Mueang Rad in the upper Menam basin, tentatively identified by some scholars with Mueang Thung Yang in Uttaradit. Comparable dynastic links may have extended southward. The Northern Chronicle relates that the Tai prince Jayasena from Phichai Chiang Mai married a princess of the southern Xiān ruling line and succeeded his father-in-law as ruler of Ayodhya.

The Sakon Nakhon hypothesis receives some support from a Vietnamese inscription of 1159 commemorating Duke Đỗ Anh Vũ. It records that in 1135 Văn Đan, generally identified with present-day Vientiane and described as under Zhenla, attacked Nghệ An and was pursued by the duke. Later Chiang Mai and Chiang Saen traditions describe Tai groups from this region, including those associated with Candrapuri, Muang Sua and Mueang Kaew Prakan, attacking Ngoenyang in the 1150s. The campaigns are said to have been defeated by the legendary Chueang, who brought the invading polities under his authority.

The same period is reflected in the Tamnan Fa Daet Song Yang (ตำนานฟ้าแดดสงยาง), which describes political fragmentation in the northern and central Korat Plateau following the movements associated with Chueang. Instead of the Angkorian-associated Phaya Khom and Muang Nong Han or Saket Nakhon Roi Et Pratu, it describes new royal lineages moving south. One settled at Muang Fa Daet–Muang Song Yang with four southern muang as allies, another formed a small mandala at Muang Chiang Som in the Lam Pao basin, allied with Chiang Yun in the middle Chi basin. The two fought repeatedly, each becoming tributary to the other in turn. Its final campaign lists numerous allied muang and ends with a decisive victory for Chiang Som, although the historical identities of many of these places remain unstudied.

Following the Mahidharapura dynasty's successive recoveries of the Angkorian throne under Jayavarman VI in the 1080s and Jayavarman VII in the 1180s, the Tai Lueang polity led by Sri Naw Nam Thum and Pha Mueang appears to have expanded through the upper Menam basin. It is said to have taken control of Chaliang and later Sukhothai, overthrowing the Mon ruler E Daeng Phloeng around 1219. An epigraphic account associated with the Khom Sabat Khlon Lamphong corpus, however, suggests a later shift to another ruling lineage. This may have prompted a joint intervention by the allied Tai Lueang and Xian rulers, whose forces under Pha Mueang and Si Intharathit are described as removing the rival ruler and restoring their influence over Sukhothai in 1238. In later reconstructions of early Thai political history, this event has been treated as one of the formative episodes associated with the foundation of the Sukhothai Kingdom.

=== Maritime expansion ===
By the close of the 13th century Xiān appears to have begun expanding southward at the expense of the Malay Peninsula. The Chinese imperial admonition of 1295 — that Xiān should not harm Ma-li-yü-êrh (Melayu) — reflects this movement. A maritime attack on the Samudera Pasai Sultanate in Sumatra, probably between 1299 and 1310, failed; the force may have been launched by the southernmost Xiān polity, Nakhon Si Thammarat, from naval bases at Takua Thalang, Trang or Syburi. Champa was raided in 1313. Temasek was attacked shortly before 1332, and Arab geographers of the period treat it as the southern limit of the Xiān coast. Cambodia was among the targets. Zhou Daguan, on his embassy of 1296–97, recorded that it imported cloth and silkworms from Xiān and had suffered repeated attacks by its people.

Wang Dayuan characterised the polity in similar terms:

Its people are aggressive. Whenever they see another country in a state of disorder, they immediately dispatch as many as one hundred ships full of sago to invade it. Recently more than seventy ships invaded Dān mǎ xī (單馬錫, taken to be Tumasik, or Singapore) and Xī lǐ (昔里).

— Wang Dayuan, Daoyi Zhilüe, p. 155 (1351)

This accords with the account of Ma Huan, who visited Ayutthaya in 1421–22 and reported that its people were practised in fighting on water and that the king regularly sent commanders to subdue neighbouring countries.

=== Ayodhya and the founding of Ayutthaya ===
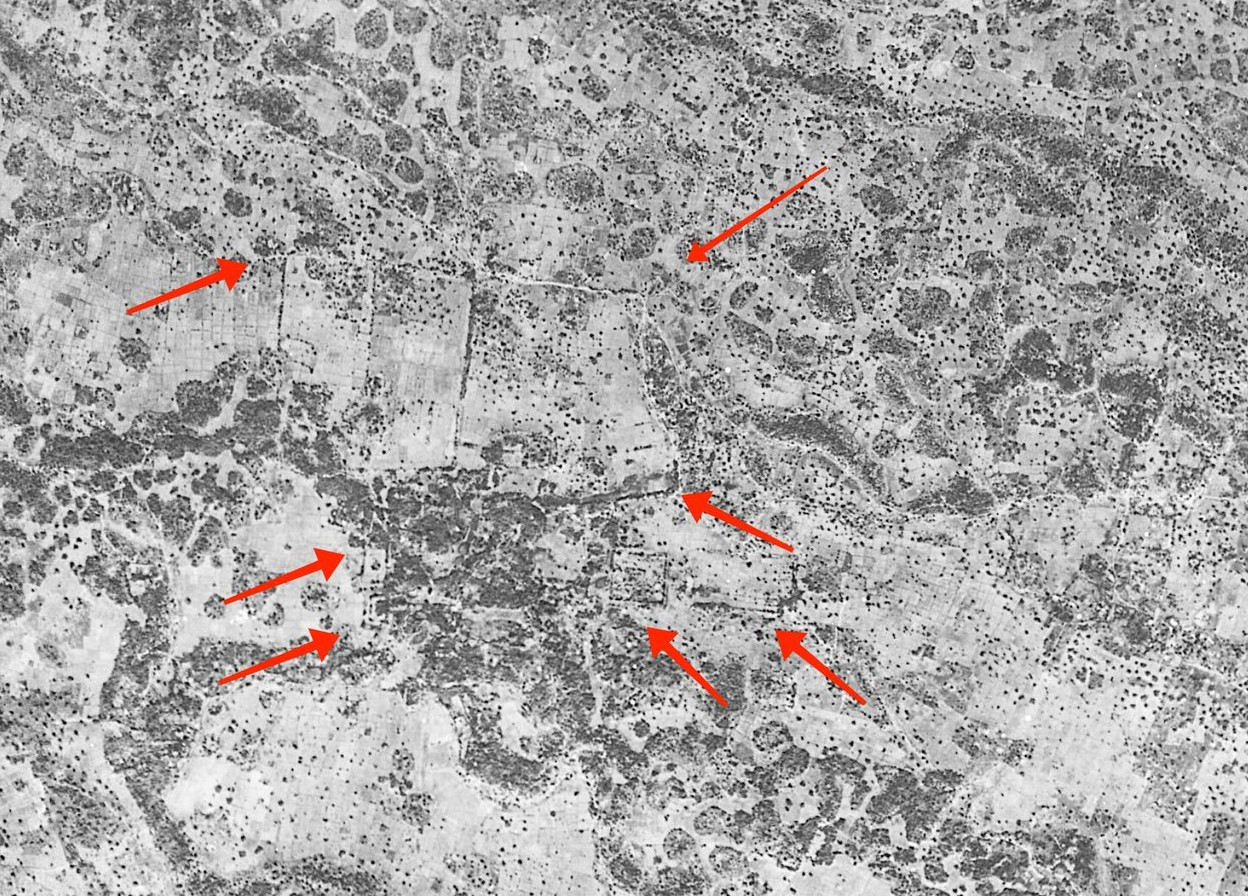
Aerial view of an ancient site at Nong Chaeng village, Don Chedi, Suphan Buri, taken in 1953, which has been proposed as one of the regional centers of Chen Li Fu.

Around the 1180s (Note: According to the Legend of Phatthalung, Sri Dharmasokaraja II is said to have reigned in another city in 1180 CE, potentially in Lavo, while in the same year the Legend of Nakhon Si Thammarat places him at Nakhon Si Thammarat, where he is described as engaging in warfare against Phichaithep Chiang Saen.)–1190s, following the loss of Lavo in 1157, Angkorian authority is said to have been reasserted in the region. The Prasat Tor Inscription records that Jayavarman VII defeated a "monarch of the west" in either 1189/90 or 1195/96, while reports place Sri Dharmasokaraja II again at Nakhon Si Thammarat.

In the same period, (Note: According to a Chinese court record dated to 1200, an embassy from this polity reported that its king had already reigned for twenty years.) Chinese sources describe the central Menam valley as controlled by its former ruling line under Pra Poa Noome Thele Seri and known as Chen Li Fu. The polity has been broadly associated with Indaprasthanagara, whose proposed centre lies in the Phraek region and which may have survived into the 13th century. (Note: The proposed center of Chen Li Fu has been identified with the Phraek region in the central Menam Valley, while Indaprasthanagara itself is thought to have remained in existence until the 13th century. The Ayutthaya Testimonies describe Indaprasthanagara as being located east of Sankhaburi, within the historical Phraek region.) The Ayutthaya Testimonies place its dynasty in the same lineage as the early Sukhothai rulers, while Walailak Songsiri suggests that the Indic name of the Chen Li Fu ruler may have been adopted as a formal title for relations with China and may reflect wider dynastic ties.

The 1225 Zhu Fan Zhi, however, lists Lavo, Chu fan chi, and Pagan among the tributary states of Angkor. Earlier scholarship identified Pagan with the lower Irrawaddy basin, while another interpretation places it in the lower Menam basin under Sri Dharmasokaraja II. The latter draws on the Phatthalung version of the Legend of Nakhon Si Thammarat, which says that his father came from Bago in Myanmar, while Chu fan chi is generally identified with Chen Li Fu.

In the lower western valley, a southern Siamese lineage is said to have taken the throne in 1205 through royal intermarriage, under the Siamese–Mon–Chinese–Cham-heritage ruler Uthong II. The enthronement is placed at Indaprasthanagara, the seat of Chen Li Fu, and Ayodhya became the seat later in his reign. The dynasty formed further marriage alliances with the Mon ruling house of Haripuñjaya at Chaliang, producing the mixed Mon–Chinese princes Dhammaraja and Baramaraja, who later ruled Ayodhya. Some scholars have consequently argued that Chinese support contributed to the Siamese seizure of power at Ayodhya. The polity was identified as Xiān in several Chinese and Đại Việt sources.

A prince of this lineage, Varashreṣṭhakumāra, who ruled at Phrip Phri, later ascended the Ayodhya throne as Ramathibodi I (Uthong V) in 1341. He strengthened his position through marriage alliances with Lavo to the east and the Tai–Siamese Suphannabhum to the west.

Lavo reached the Mongol court on its own account before the federation. David K. Wyatt notes that Lopburi is unmentioned in the Chinese record between 1225 and 1289, when it sent tribute, and that it did so separately from Xiān for the following decade and as late as 1349.

Xiān — recorded in the late 13th century as Suphan Buri and Nakhon Si Thammarat — entered into federation with Lavo in 1351, producing the Ayutthaya Kingdom with its federal seat at Ayutthaya. Phrip Phri was reduced to a frontier town under the administration of Suphan Buri, which was in turn fully absorbed into Ayutthaya in 1438, by which date Lavo and the northern cities of the former Sukhothai Kingdom had been incorporated as well. Nakhon Si Thammarat retained vassal status through the Ayutthaya and Thonburi periods, with short intervals of independence, before becoming a province of Rattanakosin in 1782.

== Peoples and society ==
The peopling of modern Thailand. Government policy in the late 1930s and early 1940s brought about the forced assimilation of various ethnolinguistic groups into the dominant Central Thai (Siamese) population.

The inscriptional record of the Dvaravati period, taken together with the archaeological evidence from the same area, suggests that the earliest population of the Xiān region was Buddhist Mon. Tai-speaking migration into the Chao Phraya basin followed from around the 9th century. Trade contact between the polities, together with intermarriage, has been proposed as the mechanism of the subsequent language shift in the region.

The Daoyi Zhilüe describes the people of Xiān as maritime in orientation. It records that the dead were preserved by the injection of mercury, that men and women dressed alike and in the same manner as the people of Lavo — hair worn in a bun and wrapped in a cotton turban, with a long shirt — and that shell money served as currency. Of Lavo, whose customs it says the people of Xiān shared, the same work records that decisions in matters of money, of grain and of travel rested with the women, whom it describes as more decisive than the men, and that salt was boiled from sea water and liquor fermented from glutinous rice.

Zhou Daguan, writing of his 1296–97 embassy to Zhenla, noted that Siamese settlers had recently arrived in Cambodia and, unlike the local population, practised sericulture, having brought their own mulberry trees and silkworms from Siam. They wove a black patterned silk for their own clothing, and because Siamese women were skilled in sewing and mending, locals with torn garments brought them to be repaired. He also recorded that Cambodia imported cloth and silkworms from Xiān while suffering repeated attacks by its people.

A separate tradition records a party of Siamese under Passara, a son of the king of Siam, who settled in Java and founded the town of Passaraan in 800 CE after a storm prevented them from reaching Makassar in Sulawesi.

== Constituent polities ==
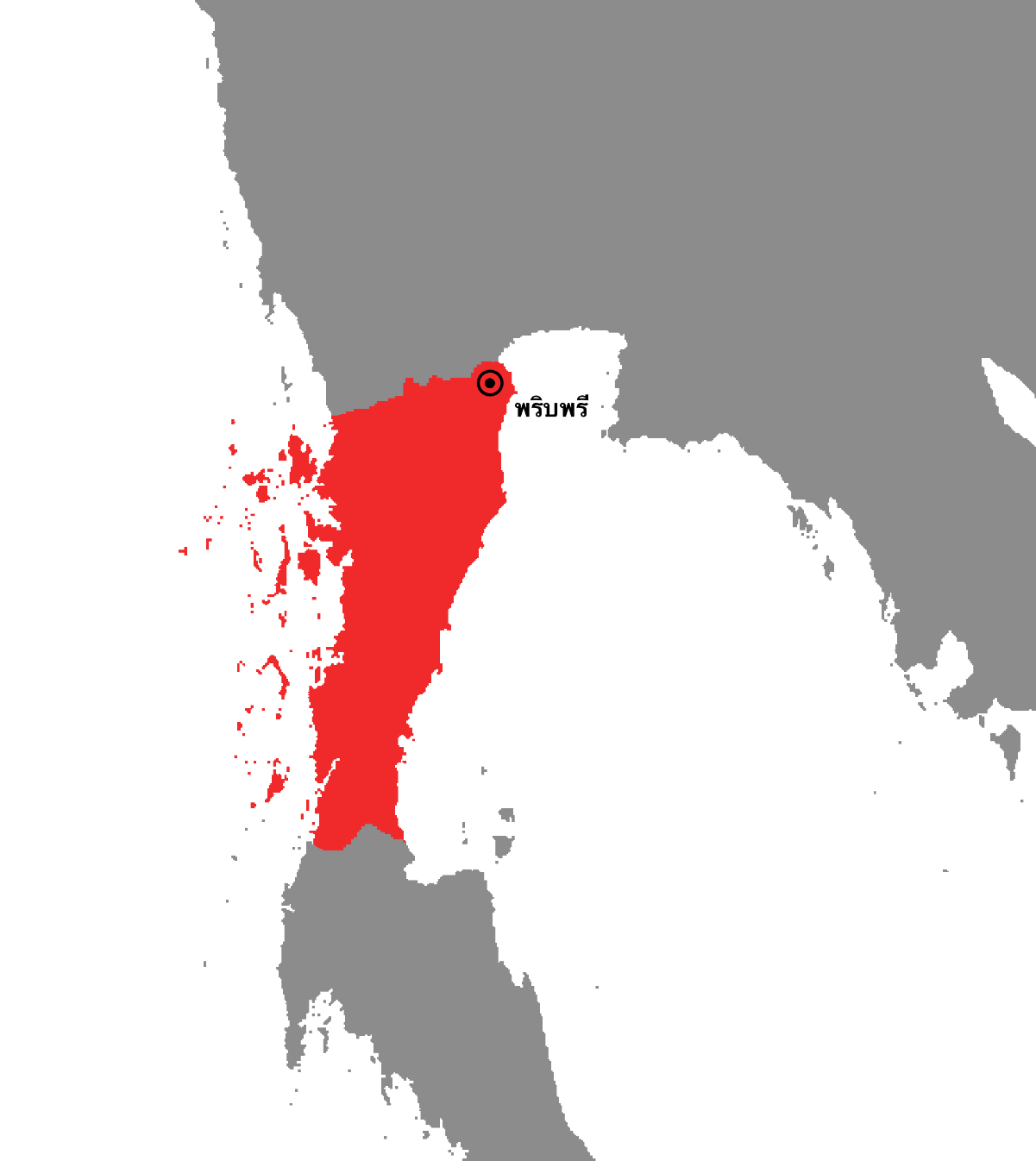
Phrip Phri in 1196, one of the Xiān polities.

On the Chinese evidence, early Xiān comprised at least two principal polities: Phrip Phri, which sent envoys to the Yuan dynasty from the late 13th into the early 14th century, and Su-men-bang (Suphannabhum), which later joined Lavo in the formation of the Ayutthaya Kingdom. Ligor came to be reckoned as Siamese after the fall of its predecessor Tambralinga, brought about by losses in the Sri Lankan wars of 1247–70, the Javanese Singhasari invasion of 1268–69, and the plague of 1270. It was subsequently revived by Siamese from Phrip Phri and developed into the Nakhon Si Thammarat Kingdom. Baker and Pasuk count four towns of the lower plain that each sent missions to China in its own name before the union of 1351, Ayodhya, Lavo, Suphan Buri and Phetchaburi, after which the Chinese records pair the first two as Xian-Luo and sometimes add Suphan Buri as Xian-Luohu-Sumenbang.

Although archaeology shows the region to have been an active node in long-distance maritime trade between the Indian Ocean and the South China Sea from the beginning of the 1st millennium, written records of these polities are scarce and much of the surviving evidence is local legend. Earlier entities in the region named in Chinese records include the five cities of Tun Sun and its northern neighbour Chin Lin. The scarcity is generally attributed to the shift in maritime routes away from the Kra Isthmus after about 500 CE, and to the decay of paper, the preferred writing material in this Buddhist region.

== Rulers ==
The lists below derive chiefly from Thai chronicle traditions rather than from contemporary documents, and the reign dates should be treated as approximate.

=== Xiān of Phraek Si Racha ===
Name		Reign	Notes
English	Thai	Reign	Notes
Māgha Shili		Early 7th century	As king of Duō Miè Kingdom
Mórú Shīlì		c. 661	As king of Duō Miè Kingdom
Under Lavo		Late 7th century	Golden age of Dvaravati Lavo
Under Si Thep		Early 8th century	Si Thep itself has possibly been linked to Wen Dan
Padumasuriyavamsa	ปทุมสุริยวงศ์	757–800	The first Siamese monarch
Padum Kumara	ปทุมกุมาร	800–?	Son of the preceding
Under Si Thep		?–859?	
Under Kamphaeng Phet		?–?	
Bharattakabba	ภะรัตกับ	?–892	No male heir
Sai Nam Peung	สายน้ำผึ้ง	892–922	Formerly a noble at the preceding ruler's court
Sudhammaraja	สุธรรมราชา	922–957	Son of the preceding. Moved the seat to Phitsanulok around 937, while the Phraek throne was obtained by Sindhob Amarin
Visnuraja	วิษณุราชา	957–987	At Phitsanulok seat. Of the Padumasūriyavaṃśa line
Vijayaraja	พิไชยราชา	987–1027	Moved the seat to Phetchaburi. Younger brother of the preceding
Srisimha	ศรีสิงห์	1027–1062	Son of the preceding; Moved the seat back to Phraek Si Racha, after the relocation southwestward of Sunthorathet of Phraek to Mueang Sing
Surindraraja	สุรินทราชา	1062–1100	Son of the preceding
During the early 12th century, Suphannaphum, Phraek Si Racha, Tak, and Lavo were under Sri Dharmasokaraja I of Tambralinga and his son. Xian monarch Suryavamsa relocated northward.
Suryavamsa	สุริยวงศ์	1100–1132	Moved the seat to Chai Nat. (Note: The exact location of Chai Nat remains uncertain. Phitsanulok has been proposed as a possible identification, as the city was known as Chai Nat during the early Ayutthaya period and had previously served as the seat of this royal line.) Younger brother of the preceding
Anuraja	อนุราชา	1132–1167	Seat at Sing Buri. Younger brother of the preceding
In 1167 the Phraek Si Racha region was conquered by Sri Dharmasokaraja II of Tambralinga.
Sri Dharmasokaraja II	ศรีธรรมโศกราชที่ 2	1167–1180	Ruled from Lavo (r. 1157–1180); Fled to Tambralinga
In 1180, the Phraek Si Racha region was taken by a dynasty possibly connected to the Mahidharapura line and re-established as Chen Li Fu.
Fang-hui-chih	พนมทะเลศรี	1170–1190s	At Mueang Sing seat. Son of Anuraja
Fang-hui-chih	พนมทะเลศรี	1180–1204/05	At Phraek Si Racha seat (Indaprasthanagara/Chen Li Fu)
Mahīdhāravarman	มหิธรวรมัน / อู่ทองที่ 2	1204/05–1211/12	Son of the preceding
In 1211/12, the seat moved to Ayodhya, where Mahīdhāravarman (Uthong II) continued to rule until 1253.

=== Xiān of Mueang Sing ===
Name		Reign	Notes
English	Thai	Reign	Notes
Sunthorathet	สุนทรเทศมหาเทพราช	Early 11th. c.	Seat shifted from Phraek Si Racha/Indaprasthanagara/Tchai Pappe Mahanacon
Rāmeśvara	ราเมศวร		Beginning with the reign of Rāmeśvara, the Ayutthaya Testimonies do not give the duration of each monarch's reign, but only describe each monarch's relationship to the preceding ruler.
Baramaraja	บรมราชา		Son of the previous
Mahācakravartin	มหาจักรวรรดิ		Son of the previous
Bodhisāra	โพธิสาร		Son of the previous
Ekarāja	เอกราชา		New dynasty.
Baramatrailoka	บรมไตรโลก	Early–mid 12th. c.	Younger brother of the previous. Prince of Si Satchanalai
Śrībhūparāja	ศิริภูปราชา		Relative of the previous
Jatiraja	ชาติราชา	?–1170	Son of the previous
Anuraja	อนุราชา	Early to mid. 12th c.	Fled from Chai Nat following a conflict with his elder brother and established himself at Mueang Sing. He may have been a co-ruler with Jatiraja, who is described in the Ayutthaya Testimonies as a relative of Anuraja's son, Pra Poa Noome Thele Seri.
Pra Poa Noome Thele Seri	พนมทะเลศรี	1170–1190s	Succeeding his relative Jatiraja
Uthong I	อู่ทอง	1190s–1205?	Younger brother of the previous. Also king of Suphannaphum
Phraya Chaiyakon	พญาไชยกร	13th. century	Name known from the Mueang Sing Inscription. Under Phrip Phri
Merged into the Ayodhya mandala from the 13th century onward.

=== Xiān of Ayodhya ===
Name		Reign	Notes
English	Thai	Reign	Notes
Narai I	พระนารายณ์	1082–1087	Son of Chandrachota, king of Lavo at Lopburi
Vacant		1087–1089	Two-year succession struggle among nine nobles
Phra Chao Luang	พระเจ้าหลวง	1089–1111	
Sai Nam Peung	สายน้ำผึ้ง	1111–1165	Son-in-law of the preceding; Xiān–Đại Việt trade relations established in 1149
Dhammikaraja	พระเจ้าธรรมิกราชา	1165–after 1224	Xiān sent tribute to Đại Việt in 1182
Uthong II	พระเจ้าอู่ทอง	1205 or 1211/12–1253	Son of Pra Poa Noome Thele Seri, king of Phrip Phri. Son-in-law of the previous.
Jayasena	พระเจ้าชัยเสน	1253–1289	Son-in-law of the preceding
Suvarnaraja	พระเจ้าสุวรรณราชา	1289–1301	Grandson of Uthong II. Xiān began campaigns against Angkor and Melayu in the 1290s and sent five tribute missions to China between 1292 and 1299
Dhammaraja	พระเจ้าธรรมราชา	1301–1310	Son-in-law of Suvarnaraja
Baramaraja	พระบรมราชา	1310–1344	Son-in-law of Suvarnaraja; (Note: The chronicle tradition makes both Dhammaraja and Baramaraja sons-in-law of Suvarnaraja, and says nothing of how the two men were related to each other.) Xiān invasion of Champa, 1313–1315
Ramathibodi I	รามาธิบดีที่ 1	1344–1369	Formation of the Ayutthaya Kingdom in 1351

== See also ==
- Lavo Kingdom
- Suphannabhum
- Qiān Zhī Fú
- Tambralinga
