= Suvarnapura Kingdom =

Polity in the lower Chao Phraya basin, 12th–13th centuries

Chên Li Fu 真里富 (Chinese)
- c. 1180 – 1205
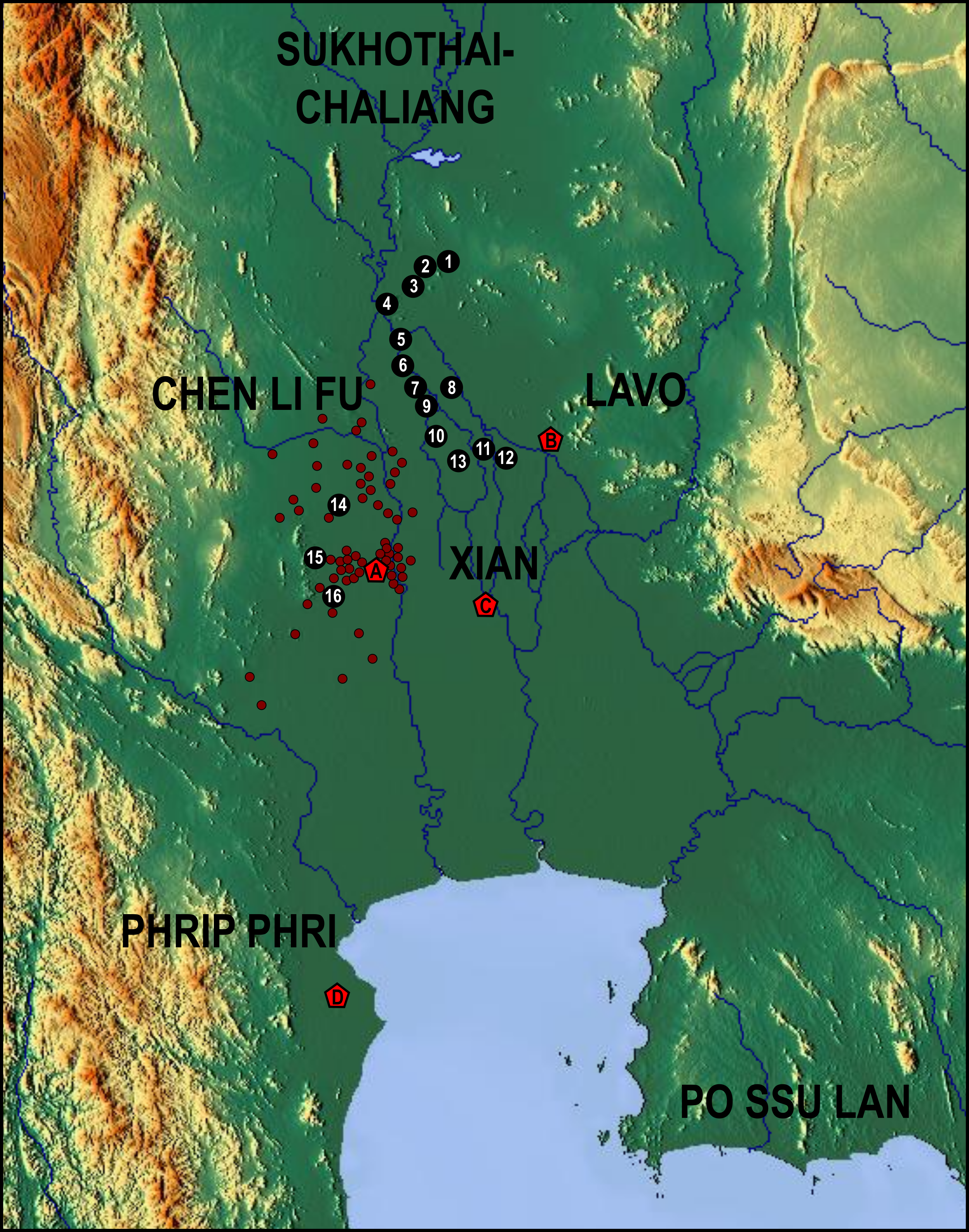
- The lower Menam basin in the 12th and 13th centuries, showing the polities placed under Chên Li Fu (1–16) and its smaller settlements (brown markers), as proposed by Walailak Songsiri.
- Capital: Phraek Si Racha (proposed)
- Common languages: Old Mon; Old Thai
- Religion: Theravada Buddhism
- Government: Kingdom
- Monarch
  - 1180–1204: Fang-hui-chih
  - 1204–1205: Mahīdhāravarman
- Historical era: Post-classical era
  - Earliest possible attestation in Chinese merchant records: c. 1103–1115
  - Phraek Si Racha region taken from Tambralinga; reorganised as Chên Li Fu: 1180
  - First recorded embassy to the Song court: 1200
  - Accession of Mahīdhāravarman; final embassy: 1205
  - Seat transferred to Ayodhya: 1205
  - Formation of the Ayutthaya Kingdom: 1351
Preceded by	Succeeded by
Dvaravati; Kamalanka	Suphannabhum; Ayutthaya

Chên Li Fu (Chinese: 真里富) was a short-lived polity on the northern shore of the Gulf of Siam, west of Chenla, known almost entirely from Chinese records of the years around 1200. It has been located in the Phraek Si Racha–Suphan Buri region of present-day Central Thailand, with a sphere of influence across the western Chao Phraya basin reaching as far south as the modern provinces of Phetchaburi and Prachuap Khiri Khan, bordering Po-Ssu-lan (modern Chanthaburi) to the south-east and Tambralinga to the south.

The polity emerged from the political fragmentation that followed the decline of Dvaravati, when authority in the Menam valley passed to a series of competing regional centres. Chinese sources record embassies from Chên Li Fu in 1200, 1202 and 1205, after which the name disappears from the record, a disappearance that coincides with the accession of Uthong II at Ayodhya in the same year.

Two questions dominate the scholarship. The first is where the polity lay. Proposals have ranged from the eastern gulf coast to U Thong, to Suphan Buri and, most recently, to Phraek Si Racha. The second is its relationship to Angkor: O. W. Wolters treated it as an Angkorian vassal that broke away around 1200, whereas Walailak Songsiri holds that it stood outside Angkorian political authority, its rulers' Khmer titles and Indic names having been adopted for prestige in dealings with the Chinese court.

== Name ==
The name is known from its Chinese transcription 真里富 (Zhēn Lǐ Fù; conventionally romanised in the older literature as Chên Li Fu). No indigenous form is attested, and the identification of the underlying toponym remains part of the localization debate. G. E. Gerini derived it from Candanapura (Chanthabun), while proponents of a western-basin location have sought its centre at sites identified with Suvarṇapura, a toponym of the Preah Khan inscription. Wolters observed that the final syllable renders -pura or -puri, a common element in Chinese transcriptions of Southeast Asian place names of the period, but proposed no derivation for Chen-li.

Chinese records style its rulers Zhǔ (主, "chief") rather than Wáng (王, "king"), and the regnal names preserved incorporate the Khmer title Kamrateng. The second of the two, transcribed Se-li-Mo-hsi-t'o-pa-lo-hung, was first read as Sri Mahendravarman; Cœdès proposed Mahīdhara instead, on the ground that 13th-century inscriptions use that element more often, and the form Mahīdhāravarman follows his suggestion.

== Localization ==
Chris Baker and Pasuk Phongpaichit place the polity in the upper gulf and some way up a river, but leave it unidentified, and report without comment a proposal that it may be Suphan Buri.

=== Eastern gulf hypotheses ===
Wolters considered that Chên Li Fu might have lain on the eastern coast of the Gulf of Siam in the Chanthabun area, in the Mae Klong valley, or across both. Gerini argued on phonological grounds that the name rendered Candanapura or Chanthabun, an identification accepted by Friedrich Hirth, W. W. Rockhill and L. P. Briggs, while George Cœdès placed it more cautiously on the Gulf of Siam. Briggs's own ground was a bearing in Ma Tuan-lin, who puts Chên Li Fu on the south-western frontier of Chenla, bounded on the south-east by Po-ssu-lan and on the south-west by Teng-liu-mei, which Briggs identified with Tambralinga. Since in his view neither the Menam valley nor any part of the peninsula belonged to Cambodia at that date, the bearing left the Chanthabun region. Wolters himself rejected the Chanthabun identification. He reasoned that the short distance between Chanthabun and Yaśodharapura, the Angkorian capital in present-day Cambodia, made Angkorian loss of control there improbable, and proposed that Chanthabun corresponded instead to Po-Ssu-lan, the south-eastern neighbour of Chên Li Fu. David K. Wyatt drew the western conclusion from the same material. Setting Wolters's finding that the polity held both a port and an inland capital beside the reconstruction of the ancient shoreline by Phōngsi Wanasin and Thiwa Supcanya, which shows numerous old towns on the western fringe of the plain and few on the eastern, and beside Wolters's own note that early Chinese navigators rarely called on the eastern coast of the Bay of Bangkok, he suggested that Chên Li Fu should be looked for as a state centred on Ratchaburi, Nakhon Chai Si or even Suphan Buri. A Song miscellany, the Yunlu Manchao (雲麓漫鈔), bears on the same question from another direction. In listing the countries whose trading vessels the maritime commissioner of Fujian visited, it names Zhenla (真腊, Chenla) and adds that it also went by the name Zhenlifu (真里富).

=== U Thong ===
Wolters located the centre of the polity at U Thong. On that identification, archaeological evidence from the site would imply an existence reaching back to about 300–600 CE. Paul Wheatley, however, identified U Thong instead with the city-state of Chin Lin, which King Fan Man of Funan is reported to have attempted to annex in the 4th century.

Three lines of evidence weigh against the U Thong hypothesis. The Northern Chronicle records that U Thong and Suphan Buri were in this period ruled by monarchs affiliated with the earlier Dvaravati polity at Nakhon Pathom. Archaeological survey around U Thong indicates a low settlement density in the relevant period, in sharp contrast to the prosperity Chinese sources attribute to Chên Li Fu, and the site appears to have been abandoned around the 12th century. A copper plate from U Thong dated to the 6th to mid-7th centuries names a King Harshavarman, whom Jean Boisselier took for a Dvaravati ruler and Cœdès for a Khmer king whose plate had been carried to the site; neither attribution sits easily with the dating, since Harshavarman I of Angkor reigned from 910 to 923.

=== Suphan Buri ===
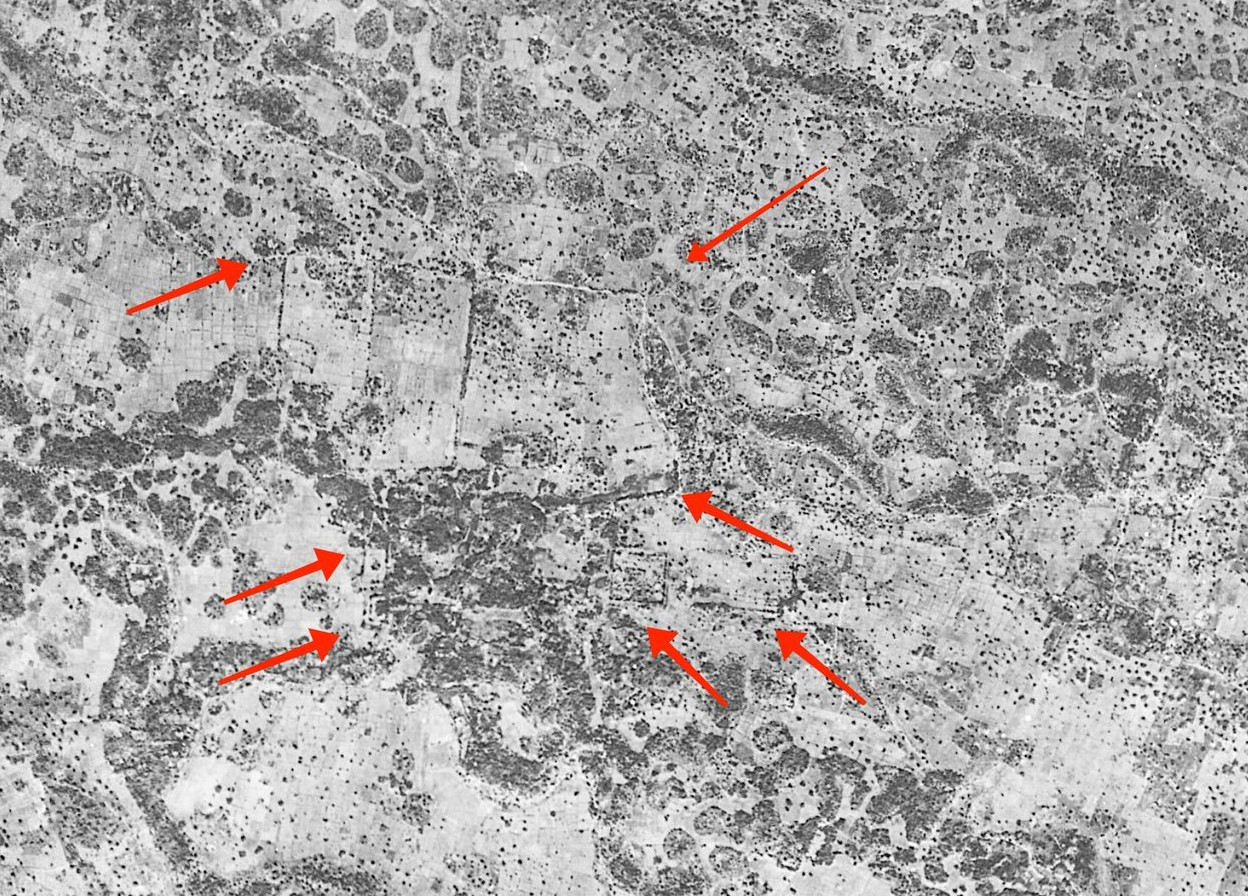
Aerial view of an ancient site at Nong Chaeng village, Don Chedi, Suphan Buri province, photographed in 1953 and proposed as a regional centre of Chên Li Fu.

The abandonment of U Thong has been explained by a shift in the river, which cut the site off from easy access to the gulf, and on that reading its people may have moved some 30 kilometres north-east to Suphan Buri. Baker and Pasuk read the plan of Suphan Buri as a hybrid, a site in a river bend with a major forest temple outside the walls in the manner of the older towns, but with a strictly rectangular moat of 1.9 by 0.7 kilometres in place of the usual conch shape and a relic stupa at the centre in Angkorian style. Both wall and stupa may date to the 12th century, the period in which Chên Li Fu is recorded.

Earlier scholarship proposed a centre near Nong Chaeng village in Sra Krachom subdistrict (ตำบลสระกระโจม), Don Chedi, Suphan Buri province, on the strength of the substantial remains of a large rectangular moated city there, tentatively identified with Suvarṇapura of the Preah Khan inscription. An alternative places Suvarṇapura at the Nern Thang Phra archaeological site (แหล่งโบราณคดีเนินทางพระ), some 20 kilometres north-east of Nong Chaeng.

Other writers equate Chên Li Fu with Suphannabhum directly. That equation conflicts with the Northern Chronicle, which places Suphannabhum under a different line of rulers in the same period, specifically Uthong I, who is said to have taken its vacant throne in 1163.

=== Phraek Si Racha ===
Walailak Songsiri and Srisakra Vallibhotama place the centre of Chên Li Fu at Phraek Si Racha, with subsidiary regional centres including Suphan Buri. Srisakra traced the route inland from the Chao Phraya mouth, through the channels that preceded the Bangkok and Ko Kret shortcut canals, past Khlong Bang Khwai and Khlong Bang Toei near Sam Khok, and up the Noi River to Phraek Si Racha. This localization sets the polity within the same framework as the early Siamese polities described in the Ayutthaya Testimonies, in particular Indaprasthanagara, whose material there spans the 9th to 12th centuries. (Note: The Ayutthaya Testimonies place Indaprasthanagara east of Sankhaburi, within the historical Phraek Si Racha region, and describe it as still in existence in the early 13th century. On this reading Chên Li Fu and Indaprasthanagara denote the same polity at different stages.)

Walailak qualifies the identification. Of the small towns running from Phraek Si Racha south to the Suphan and Tha Wa rivers, Phraek Si Racha is the only one that does not continue from the Dvaravati period, and excavation has not settled whether its occupation begins under the Southern Song or under the Yuan. Its rampart and moat are larger than those of the older square towns nearby. She accounts for this by proposing that the seat of the confederation moved out of the smaller inland waterways onto the larger river.

=== Mueang Sawan Thewalok ===
The Northern Chronicle mentions a city called Mueang Sawan Thewalok (เมืองสวรรค์เทวโลก), where Phra Phanom Thale Sri and his younger brother Uthong I settled after moving south from Mueang Chaliang around the mid-1150s. Around the 1160s, U Thong I was given the vacant throne of a city to the south of Mueang Sawan Thewalok, generally identified as Suphan Buri. Phanom Thale Sri, identified as Intharacha (อินทราชา) in the Ayutthaya Testimonies, later succeeded his relatives as ruler of Mueang Sing and moved farther south to reconstruct Phrip Phri in the 1170s and 1180s, respectively. The chronicle says that the two brothers were followed from Mueang Chaliang by a large following of as many as 54,000 people. The group therefore appears to have remained at Mueang Sawan Thewalok for roughly 15–20 years before continuing south. At Phrip Phri, Phra Phanom Thale Sri was succeeded by his son, Uthong II, who later moved to a seat in the north, whose location remains uncertain, before moving southwest to Ayodhya.

== The Menam valley after Dvaravati ==
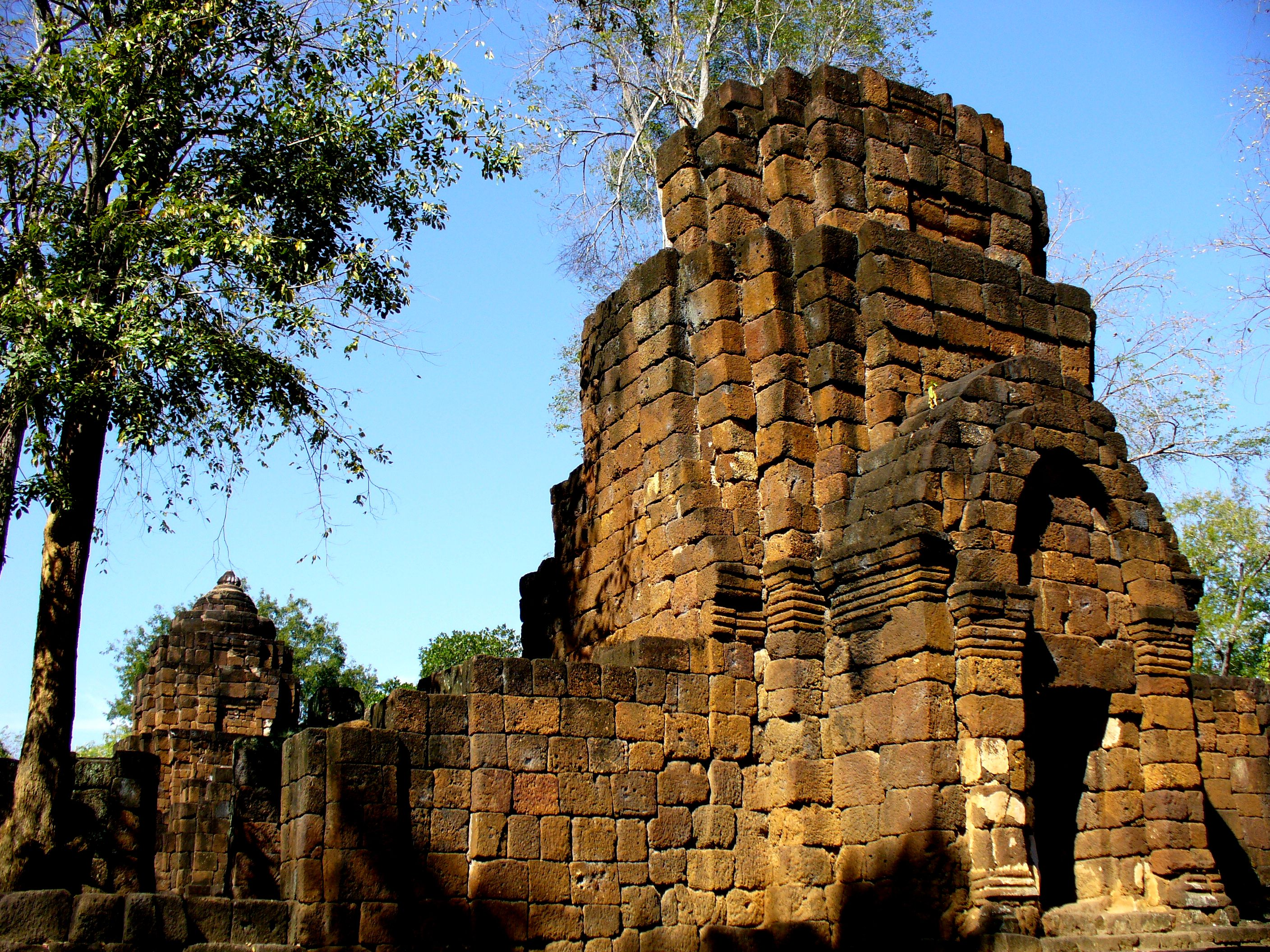
Ruins at Mueang Sing Historical Park in the western Menam valley, dating to the late 12th–early 13th century and showing strong Angkorian Bayon-style influence.

The 12th and 13th centuries formed a transitional phase after the decline of Dvaravati, marked by political fragmentation and competition among newly emergent centres in the Menam and Mae Klong basins, several of which later developed into historically attested Siamese states. The former supra-regional centres lost much of their earlier standing: Si Thep remained under Angkorian authority but declined in political and economic weight and is generally taken to have been abandoned by about the 13th century, while Nakhon Pathom and its associated site of Khu Bua appear to have been substantially depopulated as authority shifted toward the Mae Klong basin at modern Ratchaburi and Mueang Sa Kosi Narai (เมืองสระโกสินารายณ์).

The two sites mentioned aboved have been identified respectively with Jaya Rajapuri and Sambukapattana of the Preah Khan inscription (K. 904), and both show clear Angkorian cultural influence, as does nearby Pong Tuek. New sites appeared at the same time along the Suphan-Thachin and Mae Klong rivers carrying features of Angkorian town planning, among them roughly square plans aligned to the compass, a central monument, a surrounding moat or earthwork, ponds or baray outside it, and dykes thrown across the slope to catch run-off for irrigation. The two river systems differ in their material. The Mae Klong ruins are mainly laterite and have yielded images of the radiating Avalokiteśvara and other traces of Bayon-style Mahāyāna work, while those on the Tha Chin are mainly brick and have yielded Buddha images under the nāga. Baker and Pasuk read that contrast as a sign of two groups of migrants from the Khmer country rather than one.

Within this configuration the principal power of the western valleys appears to have been centred at Mueang Sing, in the present-day Mueang Sing Historical Park, while authority in the eastern plain rested at Lopburi, which alternated between Angkorian control and periods of local autonomy. Both are identified in the Preah Khan inscription as Sri Jayasimhapuri and Lavodayapura respectively. The inscription names six cities of the plain in all, which Baker and Pasuk give as Lavodayapura, Svarnapura, Sambūkapura, Jaya-Rājapuri, Jaya-Simhapuri and Jaya-Vajrapuri. They gloss these in turn as Lopburi, Suphan Buri, possibly Ban Pong, Ratchaburi, Mueang Sing, and either Phetchaburi or Kamphaeng Phet. Their placing of the Sambūka name therefore differs from its identification with Mueang Sa Kosi Narai, and the last of the six they leave unresolved.

Chinese merchants recorded several polities of this region between 1103 and 1115, during the Song dynasty, among them Zhēn Lǐ Fù (真里富) itself, alongside Róng Lǐ (茸里), Luó Hú (罗斛, Lavo) and Xún Fān (浔番). If this notice refers to the same polity, the name was in circulation some seventy years before the reorganisation of 1180 conventionally taken as its foundation, and the entity recorded in 1200 would represent a re-established rather than a newly created state.

Epigraphic evidence points to growing linguistic diversity in the lower Menam basin across the same period. Lexical elements of Thai have been identified within inscriptions otherwise composed in Pali, Sanskrit and Old Khmer, including the Dong Mae Nang Mueang inscription (K. 766) of 1167, the Phra Phuttharup Nak Prok inscription (K. 995) of 1213, and the Mueang Sing inscription (กจ. 4), tentatively dated to the 13th–14th centuries; the last records a local ruler named Phraya Chaiyakon (พฺรญาไชยกร). The script forms in these inscriptions differ markedly from those of inscriptions associated with the sphere of Jayavarman VII at Phimai, Surin, Buriram and Angkor. Comparable evidence appears in an original portion of the pre-Ayutthaya legal manuscript Phra Aiyakan Betset, internally dated by Chit Phumisak to 1235 and written wholly in Thai with archaic features recalling the Ram Khamhaeng Inscription.

== History ==
=== Before 1180 ===
The Phraek Si Racha region has a settlement history reaching back roughly 2,500 years. The earliest recorded polity there is the Duō Miè Kingdom, which appears in Chinese court records as an autonomous realm exercising authority over thirty subordinate states, not territorially extensive but populous. Duō Miè sent a tributary mission to the Chinese court in 661 during the reign of Māgha Shili (摩伽失利), after which it disappears from the documentary record. The region is generally presumed to have passed under the suzerainty of the Lavo Kingdom during the height of the Dvaravati sphere between the late 7th and 8th centuries, the Northern Chronicle attesting Lavo influence extending as far as present-day northern Thailand.

According to the Ayutthaya Testimonies, the last ruler of the Phraek Si Racha line was Anuraja, who lost the territory to Sri Dharmasokaraja II of Tambralinga around 1167. In the preceding decade two princes of the same line had moved north: Suryaraja, grandfather of Si Inthrathit, established himself at Kamphaeng Phet, while Pra Poa Noome Thele Seri moved to the Nakhon Thai–Sukhothai region. The latter subsequently returned southward, succeeding Jatiraja (ชาติราชา) at Jayasimhapuri in the 1170s and re-establishing Phrip Phri in 1188.

=== Formation, 1180 ===
In 1180 the Phraek Si Racha region passed to a royal house that may have shared dynastic affiliations with the Mahidharapura line of the Phimai region, and the polity was reorganised under the name recorded by the Chinese as Chên Li Fu. Walailak states the connection more cautiously elsewhere, suggesting that Mahīdhāravarman may be the name of a prominent ruler from the polities north of the Dangrek range, adopted as a formal style for use with the Chinese court and perhaps accompanied by kinship ties. The territory described in the Chinese sources corresponds closely to that attributed in Thai texts to Pra Poa Noome Thele Seri, who is recorded as exercising authority over the western and central Menam basin in the same period.

Angkorian military activity in the west is recorded in the same years. The Prasat Tor inscription has Jayavarman VII defeating a "monarch of the west" in either 1189/90 or 1195/96, and Sri Dharmasokaraja II is reported to have withdrawn to Nakhon Si Thammarat. (Note: The traditions diverge on where Sri Dharmasokaraja II was in 1180. The Legend of Phatthalung has him reigning in another city, possibly Lavo, while the Legend of Nakhon Si Thammarat places him at Nakhon Si Thammarat in the same year, at war with Phichaithep Chiang Saen.)

=== Embassies to the Song court, 1200–1205 ===
Chên Li Fu is named in the Chinese Song Huiyao under the years 1200–1205. The text places it in the south-western quarter, bordered by Po-Ssu-lan to the south-east and Teng-liu-mei (登流眉, Tambralinga) to the south-west, five days by sea from Po-Ssu-lan and one day further to Chenla. It was the only trading centre on the northern gulf then visited by Chinese ships; the capital lay inland, linked to the sea by river, and the voyage to Qingyuan in Song China took eighty days.

By the early 13th century the Song court had ceased receiving envoys from Southeast Asian kingdoms and was discouraging both missions and their trade, though Chinese merchant vessels continued to call at Chên Li Fu. By then the other states of the region had long since stopped. The last recorded mission from Tambralinga was in 1070, from Java or Sri Boja in 1109, from Lavo in 1115 and 1155, from Cambodia in 1135 and from Srivijaya in 1178, leaving Chên Li Fu the only polity of the southern seas still sending tribute. On 23 September 1200, twenty years after his accession, (Note: A Chinese court record of 1200 states that the embassy reported its king as having already reigned twenty years, which places his accession at about 1180 and supplies the conventional foundation date for the polity.) the king of Chên Li Fu, styled Mo-lo-pa-kan-wu-ting-ên-ssŭ-li-fang-hui-chih (Kamrateng Sri Fang-hui-chih), sent senior palace officials with a memorial for the Chinese court, presenting a gold-engraved scroll bearing the king's hand in black script, two elephants and various local products. Baker and Pasuk describe the polity's tribute to the Chinese court as elephants, ivory, rhinoceros horn and cloth. (Note: Baker and Pasuk give the Khmer title, the name Sri Mahidharavarman and the sixty settlements to a single ruler, where Wolters, whom they cite for it, distinguishes Fang-hui-chih of the 1200 embassy from Mahīdhāravarman of 1205.) Citing the distance, the emperor instructed Chên Li Fu to send no further tribute.

How the court received the embassy is read in two ways. Its acceptance despite the general policy of restricting such contact has prompted question as to the standing accorded Chên Li Fu, and one explanation draws on the tradition preserved in the Legend of Nakhon Si Thammarat, which records that Pra Poa Noome Thele Seri, identified with Fang-hui-chih, married a daughter of the Chinese emperor of mixed Chinese–Cham parentage. Baker and Pasuk read the same exchange in the opposite sense, the officials dismissing the memorial as a comic affair and the polity being excused from further tribute, and place it among the several upper-gulf ports whose rulers were then seeking entry to the China trade. Further embassies followed in 1202 and in 1205 under a new ruler, Mahīdhāravarman.

=== Transfer of the seat to Ayodhya, 1205 ===
After the accession of Mahīdhāravarman and the embassy of 1205, no further reference to Chên Li Fu appears in Chinese records. The same year saw Uthong II, son of Pra Poa Noome Thele Seri, accede at Ayodhya, and the Phraek Si Racha region, previously under his father's authority, was incorporated into that polity. The convergence between the territories attributed to Pra Poa Noome Thele Seri and to Fang-hui-chih, and between the accession dates of their respective sons, has been read as showing that the two father-and-son pairs are the same, and hence that Mahīdhāravarman is Uthong II. (Note: The identification is based on the proposed identification of his father, Pra Poa Noome Thele Seri, with Fang-hui-chih in the Chinese account.) The identification is not made in the Chinese record. Baker and Pasuk treat Chên Li Fu and the early history of Ayodhya as separate subjects and connect them nowhere; they hold the early history of Xiān to be unknown and name no ruler of Ayodhya before Ramathibodi I.

Material evidence for a settlement at Ayodhya before the fourteenth century is thin but not absent. Excavation has yielded pottery datable to the 1270s, and traces of pre-twelfth-century building survive beneath Wat Mahathat and the adjacent Wat Khun Mueang Jai, where Khmer motifs are carved on stones thought to come from an earlier structure. Where that settlement lay is disputed. Srisakra Vallibhotama placed it east of the later city, on the evidence of old wat and traces of barai, while Baker and Pasuk prefer the river meander later closed by a canal and read the eastern wat as forest monasteries. The Phananchoeng image was established there in 1324/5, and the Sukhothai monk Si Sattha, visiting about 1344, called the place Ayodhya Si Ramathepnakhon, a name drawn from the Ramayana. None of these notices names a ruler.

Baker and Pasuk caution against the dynastic material on which the identification rests. They note that Ayodhya has left no inscription of warrior glory and no ballad or legend securely dated to its early years. They count seven incompatible accounts of its founder, and argue that both the foundation stories and the early dynastic chronology were assembled later, when rulers needed a genealogy.

=== Aftermath ===
Angkorian influence in the Menam valley waned during the 13th century while new polities are recorded in the area. Chinese sources name Xiān for the first time in 1282/3, when an official fleeing the Mongol army took refuge there. Xiān sent its first mission in 1292, its ruler presented a gold plate at court in 1295, and further missions followed in 1299, 1300, 1314, 1319 and 1323; over the same span Lavo sent four missions between 1289 and 1299 and Phetchaburi one in 1294. Among the polities so recorded was Pi-ch'a-pu-li, identified with Phetchaburi, whose ruler bore the Xiān royal style Gan-mu-ding and sent an envoy to China in 1295, and Su-men-bang, identified with Suphan Buri, under Zhao Lu-qun Ying (Chao Nakhon In), also crown prince of Xiān, who sent missions in 1377, 1396 and 1398. (Note: Baker and Pasuk list five missions from the Su-men-bang prince, in 1374, 1379, 1388, 1396 and 1398, and describe him as heir to the king of Siam.)

The region fell within the tributary sphere of the Sukhothai Kingdom during the reign of Ramkhamhaeng (r. 1279–1298), and subsequently entered the city-state confederation with Lavo's Ayodhya that produced the Ayutthaya Kingdom in the 14th century. Accounts dated 1349 record both that Xiān submitted to Luo-hu and that Xiān brought Luo-hu to submission, a discrepancy Baker and Pasuk attribute to copying error; thereafter the Chinese records treat the two as a pair, Xiān-Luo, and sometimes add Suphan Buri as Xiān-Luohu-Sumenbang.

A separate reading connects Chên Li Fu with the Siamese polity of Suphannabhum. Walailak Songsiri proposes that after the first half of the 13th century the Chên Li Fu towns developed into Suphannabhum, taking in settlements on the Khwae Noi and Khwae Yai, part of the Mae Klong, part of Phraek Si Racha and part of Chainat at the mouth of the Noi, while Sing Buri and Phrom Buri belonged instead to the Lavo network. She reads the inscriptions and archaeology of the same span as showing the western valleys tied northward to Haripuñjaya, to the group of towns around Sukhothai, and southward to Tambralinga, with a network of west-coast and gulf-side towns growing economically at the same time. On her account that is how the names Suphannabhum, Ratchaburi, Phetchaburi and Nakhon Si Thammarat come to stand in the Ram Khamhaeng Inscription and in the Wat Si Chum inscription, both of which look back to events of the first half of the 13th century.

== Relations with Angkor ==
Whether Chên Li Fu was subordinate to Angkor between 1180 and 1205 is unsettled, and the question bears directly on how the political geography of the Menam valley under Jayavarman VII is understood. Wolters, working within Cœdès's framework of Southeast Asian history, held that Chên Li Fu had become an Angkorian vassal or fallen under Angkorian influence during the 12th century. He rested the argument partly on its rulers' use of the Khmer title Kamrateng, inferring that the polity was a Khmer dependency until the embassy of 1200, and that it broke away as Khmer power declined and the Menam valley came to be dominated by Siamese. The weight the embassy carries in that argument rests on a convention of the field, which Wyatt states as the assumption that a tribute mission to the Chinese court indicates independence, or a bid for it; on that reading the missions of 1200 to 1205 mark an attempt to assert independence rather than an established one. Songsiri, by contrast, holds that Chên Li Fu stood outside Angkorian political authority, and reads the Khmer title and the Indic royal name as court usage borrowed for dealings with China rather than as marks of subordination. Supporting evidence cited for this interpretation includes a week-long religious observance undertaken after 1188 by Pra Poa Noome Thele Seri at Lavapura in Lavo, then under Angkorian control, the accession of Uthong II at Ayodhya without any recorded conflict, and the dispatch of Buddha images by Jayavarman VII for installation in polities of the lower Menam basin, attested in the Preah Khan inscription (K. 908). She also observes that Cœdès later withdrew part of the framework himself. In the study he published with Jean Boisselier in 1965, translated into Thai by Subhadradis Diskul, he no longer held Suryavarman I to be the son of a king of Nakhon Si Thammarat, and treated Lopburi art as descended from Dvaravati art rather than imported from Cambodia.

The titulature argument is weakened by comparative evidence. The 13th-century ruler of the southern neighbour Phip Phli likewise bore the style Gan-mu-ding, generally equated with Kamrateng, and dispatched missions to the Chinese court in 1295, during a period of Angkorian weakness under Jayavarman VIII, who suffered repeated attacks from Xiān. Given the general weight of Angkorian cultural influence in the region, the dynasties of Phrip Phri, Sukhothai and Chên Li Fu alike may have adopted Angkorian norms of titulature without political subordination. Cœdès recorded a son of Jayavarman VII holding Lopburi under the style "prince of Lavo", which Songsiri reads as evidence of kinship between the two ruling houses rather than of administration.

A near-contemporary use of the title is recorded outside the Menam valley. An inscription of 1183 on the base of a bronze Buddha image at Chaiya names a ruler as Kamrateng-an Maharaja Sri Mat Trailokyaraja Mauli Bhusanavarmadeva. Chit Phumisak read the style as one of dependency, holding that kamrateng an was the Angkorian designation for the governor of a subject city rather than for a sovereign. He supported this from the level of the language used for the royal command, which the inscription renders as tabeh sakti rather than the prah bandval or prah ongkar reserved for an independent king. That distinction turns on register within the Khmer court vocabulary and can be tested against any text that preserves a ruler's command; the Chinese notices of Chên Li Fu record the title but not the wording of its rulers' orders. Chit's conclusion was framed by the older view that the Menam valley and the upper peninsula formed part of the Angkorian domain before the Sukhothai period. He states it directly elsewhere in the same work, listing Sukhothai, Ayodhya, Sri Dharmaraja, Mueang Rat, and Vientiane, as dependencies of the Khmer that threw off Khmer rule in a single wave after the death of Jayavarman VII, and treating Khom Sabat Khlon Lamphong at Sukhothai as an Angkorian commander.

The reading of the Jayabuddhamahanatha images as evidence of rule goes back to Cœdès, who identified the recipients in present-day Thailand as Lopburi, Suphan Buri, Ratchaburi, Phetchaburi and Mueang Sing, and took their distribution to confirm the king's political as well as his religious authority. Two considerations weigh against it. The distribution of Angkorian hospitals (arogyasala) and fire houses (vahnigrha) built along the roads radiating from Angkor toward regional centres extends no further west than Prachin Buri; on this basis the Preah Khan inscription's record of the Jayabuddhamahanatha images sent to at least six Menam-valley polities may be better read as cultural diplomacy than as evidence of direct control. Archaeological evidence from Mueang Sing points the same way. Although its architecture and ornament closely follow the Bayon style of Jayavarman VII's reign, it has been suggested that only the principal craftsmen or architects came from Angkor or from Angkorian Lavodayapura, the remainder of the work being local, an interpretation supported by the site's asymmetries and proportional irregularities and by sculpture-base inscriptions in Late Angkorian script and language, implying completion or modification after Jayavarman VII's reign. Songsiri dates the arrival of Angkorian religious forms in the western basin to the second half of the 13th century, after that reign, and takes the radiating Avalokiteśvara images from Mueang Sing, Mueang Sa Kosi Narai and Lopburi to be Angkorian work or the work of court-trained craftsmen, unlike the local bronze casting of the Suphan Buri sites.

Baker and Pasuk add three arguments of the same kind, drawn from what the Angkorian record does not contain. Angkorian inscriptions and reliefs record campaigns to the east in quantity, while the record of campaigning in the west amounts on their count to a single ambiguous notice, the Banteay Chhmar inscription, which has Jayavarman VII and his son resisting an army in the west without saying how far west. The Menam plain has yielded none of the temple-endowment inscriptions characteristic of Angkorian provinces, and Michael Vickery found only sparse references there to officials holding Khmer titles, which bears directly on any inference drawn from titulature alone. Angkor's own records treat resource transfers in detail and say nothing of flows from the provinces, and Hermann Kulke has argued that the heartland was self-sufficient and had no need to look far afield. On Srisakra Vallibhotama's reading the adoption of Angkorian forms in the plain was patchy and elective, some local rulers associating themselves with Angkor by marriage, symbolic tribute, derivative monuments and a part in its dynastic politics while others did not, so that what spread was Angkor's ritual prestige rather than its armies and its administration.

This interpretation is nevertheless complicated by the 1225 Zhu Fan Zhi of Zhao Rukuo, which names Zhenlifu itself among the dependent states (屬國) of Chenla, alongside Deng liu mei (登流眉, Tambralinga), Po si lan (波斯兰, Lavo) and San luo (三派). Wyatt doubts that notice. He observes that he cannot see how Angkor might have controlled Tambralinga in 1225 without also controlling Chia-lo-hsi, Grahi, and that Chinese sources of the kind sometimes copied earlier writers uncritically. The same work lists Lavo, Chu fan chi and Pagan among Angkor's tributaries. Chu fan chi is generally identified with Chên Li Fu; earlier scholarship read the Pagan of this passage as the lower Irrawaddy basin, though it has also been proposed that it denoted the lower Menam basin under Sri Dharmasokaraja II, an interpretation drawing on the Phatthalung recension of the Legend of Nakhon Si Thammarat, which traces his father's origins to Bago.

== Society and economy ==
Chên Li Fu comprised more than sixty settlements, each with its own administrator. Senior officials used silver vessels and tents of flowered silk. The population is described as following Buddhist law; disputes were settled by the parties proceeding to the temple of the god of potent magic and drinking the water of the Buddha in each other's presence, the one who remained at ease being held to speak the truth and the one who showed distress to be lying.

The ruler is described as living in a palace resembling a Buddhist temple, with utensils of gold and tents of Chinese red floss silk. White clothing was his prerogative, his curtains white gauze interwoven with gold, beneath a canopy of dry red over madder-red, striped red and green. Officials saluted him with bowed heads and clasped hands, and official documents were bound in black skin and written in white powder. David K. Wyatt adds that the Chinese account likened the script to musical notation, and that a copy of the polity's own document was said to be in the manner of Malabar.

Its resources were ivory, rhinoceros horn, local beeswax, lakawood, foreign oil, coarse perfumes, cardamoms and ebony. Dark red gauze and pottery, brought by Chinese ships, were in demand, and pieces of lead served as currency in dealings in clothing and food. Lead in various forms is a common find at ancient sites across the plain, used by weight in place of the cowries of earlier and later periods. It was smelted at settlements below the western ranges, among them Ban Nong Chaeng in Don Chedi, where the debris is found with Northern and Southern Song ceramics and Northern Song coins. Ingots of the same kind travelled as cargo, as in the Ko Khram wreck, from mines at Song Tho and the Khlitee stream.

No evidence securely establishes the ethnic composition of the population. Wolters took it to be largely Mon rather than Tai, and other sources indicate a Mon presence; in the 16th century Tomé Pires, writing of Ayutthaya, described the people of "Siam" as resembling those of Pegu in the Hanthawaddy Kingdom. Thai textual sources place the region under the Siamese ruler Pra Poa Noome Thele Seri and then his son Uthong II during the 12th and 13th centuries. Srisakra Vallibhotama argues for a mixed population by this period, citing Dvaravati forms that imply a Mon-Khmer substrate, temple servants of Tai origin named in inscriptions, Tai-language inscriptions written in Khom script that record local leaders, and Chinese settlers in the trading towns.

== Rulers ==
Ruler		Reign	Seat	Notes
Name	Identified with	Reign	Seat	Notes
Before 1167 the Phraek Si Racha region was held by a Padumasuriyavamsa line, ending with Anuraja.
From 1167 to 1180 the region was under Sri Dharmasokaraja II of Tambralinga.
Fang-hui-chih	Phanom Thale Seri / Intharacha	1180–1204	Proposed center in the Phraek Si Racha region, with further centres at Nong Chaeng, Sra Krachom subdistrict, Don Chedi, Suphan Buri province	Son of Anuraja. A Chên Li Fu merchant is recorded as having died after reaching China in 1165.
Mahīdhāravarman; Se-li-Mo-hsi-t'o-pa-lo-hung	Uthong II	1204–1205 or 1211/12	Proposed center in the Phraek Si Racha region, with further centres at Nong Chaeng, Sra Krachom subdistrict, Don Chedi, Suphan Buri province	Son of the preceding. Angkorian influence waning; several Xiān polities emerging.
Seat shifted to Ayodhya, 1205 or 1211/12

== See also ==
- Xiān
- Indaprasthanagara
- Lavo Kingdom
- Suphannabhum
