= Mueang Sing =

Mueang Sing may refer to:

- Mueang Sing, Laos, Luang Namtha Province, Laos
- Mueang Sing historical park, Kanchanaburi province, Thailand
- Mueang Sing, historical province of Siam, precursor of today's Sing Buri Province, Thailand
- Mueang Sing, historical province of Siam, precursor of today's Sing subdistrict, Sai Yok, Kanchanaburi province, Thailand
