= Duō Miè Kingdom =

7th century political entity

Duō Miè Kingdom 多蔑国 (Chinese) Duō Miè Guó
- Late 6th century – c.661
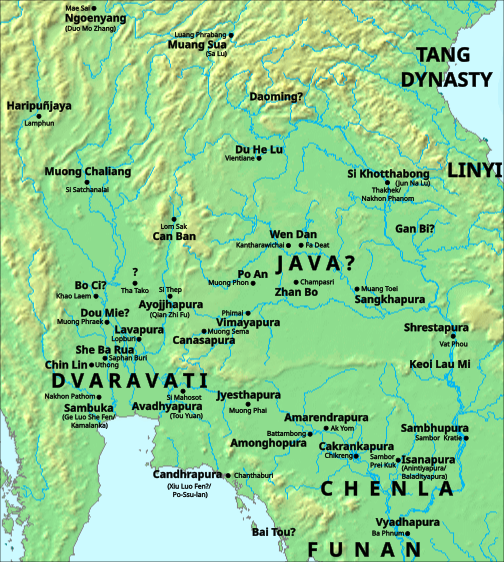
- Proposed locations of ancient kingdoms in Menam and Mekong Valleys in the 7th century based on the details provided in the Chinese leishu, Cefu Yuangui, and others.
- Capital: Phraek Si Racha
- Religion: Buddhism
- Government: Kingdom
  - Late 6th–early 7th-c.: Māgha Shili
  - c. 661: Mórú Shīlì
- Historical era: Post-classical era
  - Decline of Chin Lin: 6th century
  - Established: Late 6th century
  - First tribute to China: Early 7th century
  - Second tribute to China: 661
Preceded by	Succeeded by
Chin Lin	Indaprasthanagara
- Today part of: Thailand

Duō Miè Kingdom or Míng Miè (多蔑国), shortly called Miè (蔑), was an ancient kingdom mentioned in the Chinese leishu, Cefu Yuangui, compiled during the Song dynasty (960–1279 CE), and in the Tang Huiyao. It was located on the coast of the South Sea. Its territory can be traveled around for a month. It met the sea to the south and adjoined Dvaravati's vassal, Tou Yuan, to the east. Bordered the kingdom of Jù Yóu or Dàn Yóu (俱游国/但游国) to the west and the kingdom of Bō Cì or Bō Là (波刺国/波剌國) to the north.

Duō Miè was not subject to other states, and despite not being an enormous kingdom, it had a large population. There were 30 states (cities) under its rule. It has state walls, palaces, towers, and fortresses, all made of tiles and wood. There are 4,000 guards. Although they have bows, arrows, swords, shields, and armor, they do not have battle formations. There are criminal law documents and marriage ceremonies. Religion worships Buddha and other gods. Their king wears clothes made of morning glory fiber and linen. The king's surname is Māgha (摩伽; Mó-jiā), his given name is Shili (失利; Shī-lì), and his royal title is Sī-duō-tí (斯多题). Duō Miè established relations with China during the Zhenguan period (627–649 CE) of Emperor Taizong of the Tang dynasty and later sent tribute to the Chinese court again by King Mórú Shīlì (摩如失利) in 661 during the reign of Emperor Gaozong.

Its products include gold, silver, copper, iron, ivory, rhinoceros horn, morning glory clothes, and others. Its animals include rhinoceros, elephants, horses, and cattle, and its fruits include betel nuts. Its peaches, dates, melons, plums, and vegetables and grains are similar to those in China. Gold and silver are used for transactions, and the people pay a twentieth tax. The residents are short in stature, and brothers marry one wife. Women always make horns out of their hair to identify the number of their husbands.

== Interpretation ==
No additional evidence about Duō Miè has been found, and its identification remains disputed. However, since it bordered west of Tou Yuan, if Tou Yuan was on the eastern coast of the Bay of Bangkok as cited by Lawrence P. Briggs; particularly Lopburi as said by Tatsuo Hoshino, or Si Mahosot by Piriya Krairiksh, Duō Miè should be situated on the western Menam Valley in central Thailand. On the other hand, if Tou Yuan was in the upper Tanintharyi Coast, Duō Miè should be somewhere in the Irrawaddy Delta.

If Duō Miè was situated in the western Menam Valley, particularly in the vicinity of Phraek Si Racha, (Note: According to the cartographic reconstruction of Dvaravati polities proposed by K. M. Mudar, Nakhon Pathom region corresponded to Dvaravati's Kamalanka or later Ge Luo She Fen; the Lopburi and Prachinburi regions constituted Tou Yuan, the polity that subsequently evolved into the Lavo Kingdom; the Uthong–Suphanburi region was identified with Chin Lin, which later transformed into She Ba Ruo (舍跋若), and the Si Thep region was associated with Qiān Zhī Fú. Within this interpretive framework, Duō Miè was therefore most plausibly situated in the sole remaining area that both contained a substantial concentration of ancient Dvaravati settlements and possessed access to the southern maritime routes—namely, the Phraek Si Racha or Chai Nat region.) it is plausible that the polity came under the hegemony of Lavo during the reign of Kalavarnadisharaja (r. 648–700). This line of monarchs is traditionally credited with the annexation of Tou Yuan and the establishment of the Lavo Kingdom in 648. According to the Northern Chronicle, the territorial domain of Lavo during his reign extended to Kosambi in the northwest, Sukhothai in the north, and Sawangkaburi in the northeast. Notably, these three polities were situated upstream from the Phraek Si Racha region, reinforcing the plausibility of Lavo's political dominance over the area.

Earlier scholarship posited that Duō Miè was a minor coastal polity located south of Línyì, an interpretation based primarily on the geographical information found in the Cefu Yuangui. However, this source also places Tamna—another polity that dispatched tribute to the Chinese court in the same year as Duō Miè in 661—to the south of Línyì, a location now demonstrably erroneous. The misplacement of Tamna thus undermines the reliability of Cefu Yuangui’s description in this context. Other researchers have alternatively argued that Duō Miè may have been situated in southern India.
