= Zinme Yazawin =

18th-century Burmese chronicle

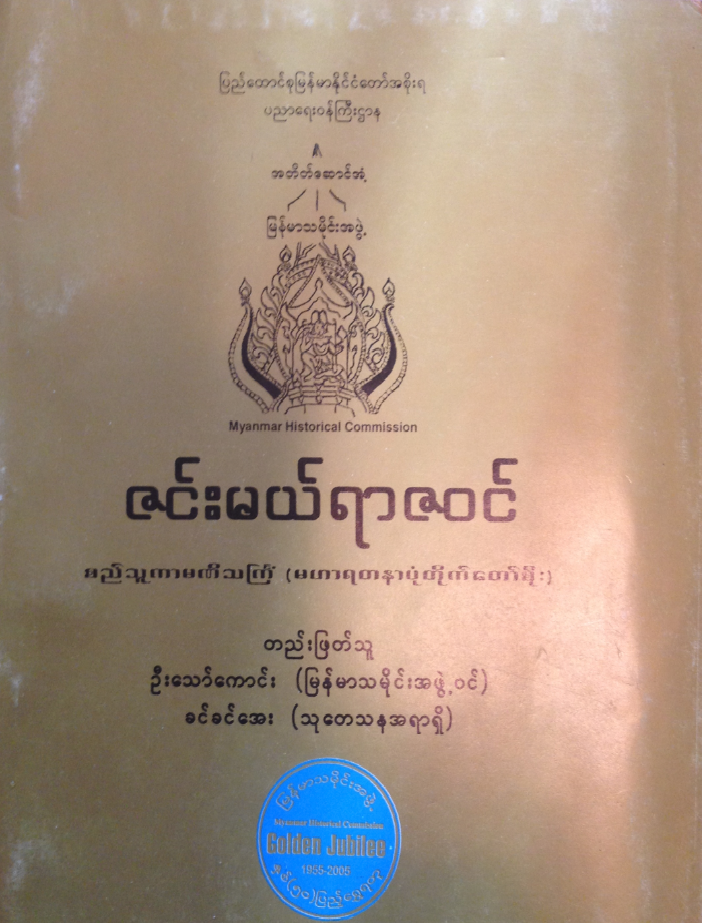
- 2006 publication
- Author: Sithu Gamani Thingyan
- Original title: ဇင်းမယ် ရာဇဝင်
- Translator: Thaw Kaung and Ni Ni Myint
- Language: Burmese
- Series: Burmese chronicles
- Genre: Chronicle, History
- Publication date: 18th century
- Publication place: Kingdom of Burma
- English publication date: 2003

Zinme Yazawin (Burmese: ဇင်းမယ် ရာဇဝင်, lit. 'Chronicle of Chiang Mai') is an 18th-century Burmese chronicle that covers the history of Lan Na under Burmese rule (1558–1775). The first English translation of the chronicle was published in 2003.

== Bibliography ==
- Aung-Thwin, Michael A. (2005). The Mists of Rāmañña: The Legend that was Lower Burma (illustrated ed.). Honolulu: University of Hawai'i Press. ISBN 9780824828868.
