= Phraek Si Racha =

Subdistrict in Sankhaburi district, Chai Nat province, Thailand

Coordinates: 15.0472222°N 100.1616667°E

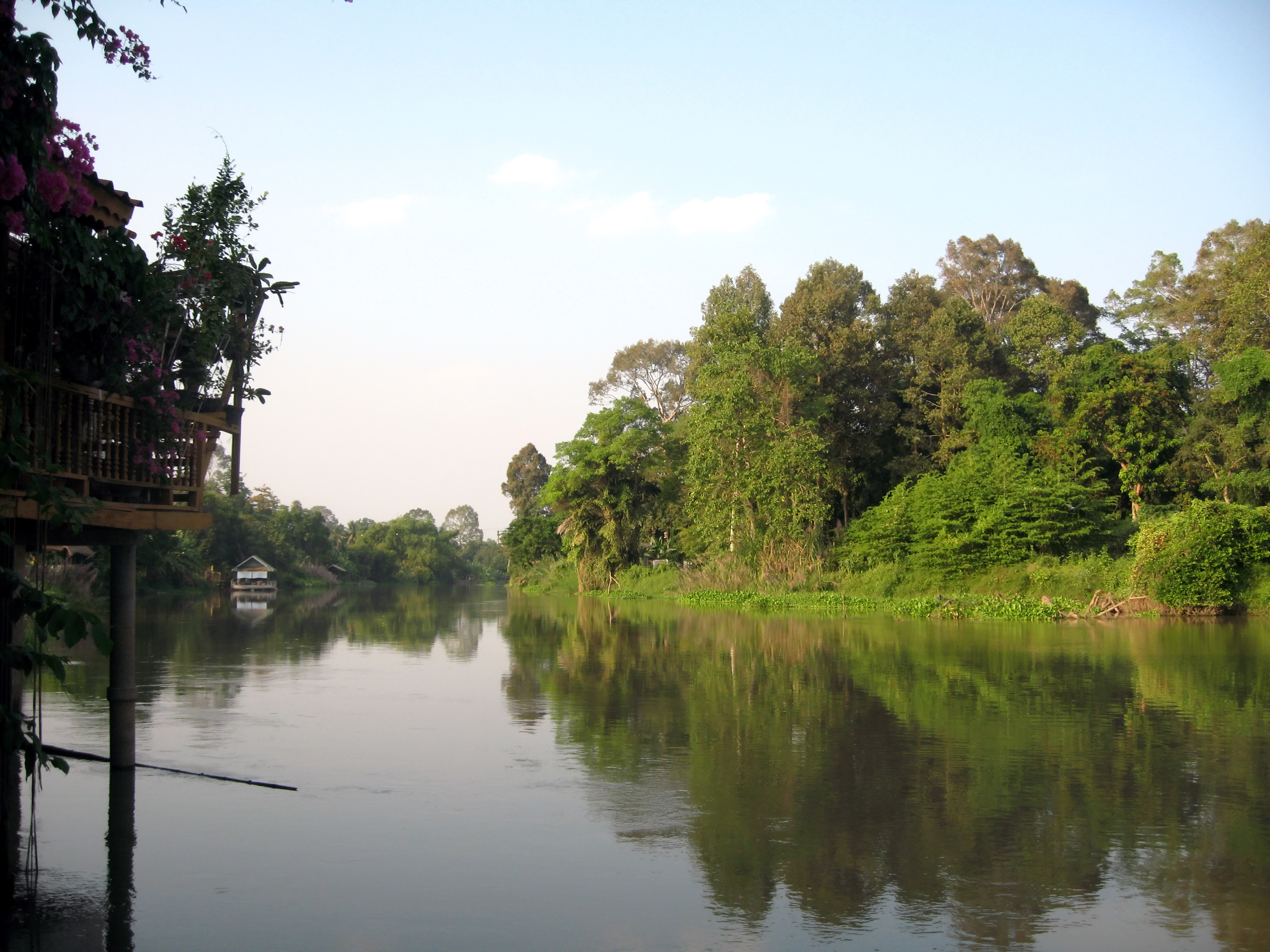
The Noi river as it flows through Phraek Si Racha

Phraek Si Racha (Thai: แพรกศรีราชา, pronounced [pʰrɛ̂ːk sǐː rāː.t͡ɕʰāː]) is a tambon (sub-district) in Sankhaburi district, Chai Nat province, central Thailand. It is considered the downtown Sankhaburi where the district office is located.

== History ==
Phraek Si Racha is a historic place, its history dates back to around 2,500 years ago, before the establishment of Ayutthaya Kingdom. Its name is inscribed in the Ram Khamhaeng Inscription as the vassal state of Sukhothai Kingdom. The terrain is a lowland along the Noi river, a tributary of the Chao Phraya river. This made Phraek Si Racha a water transportation community that could navigate along the Noi river to meet the Chao Phraya in the present-day Chai Nat province, or could travel along other local waterways to the Tha Chin river, where Suphannabhum State (now Suphanburi province) was located. In short, Phraek Si Racha was a passageway for water travel to larger city-states such as Suphannabhum or Ayutthaya, and could exit to the Gulf of Siam via both waterways.

The word Praek is a Mon language meaning "waterway junction" or "confluence". Overall, it means "a town located at the junction of rivers". Assumed that Sankhaburi was probably a name that was changed in the middle Ayutthaya period onwards.

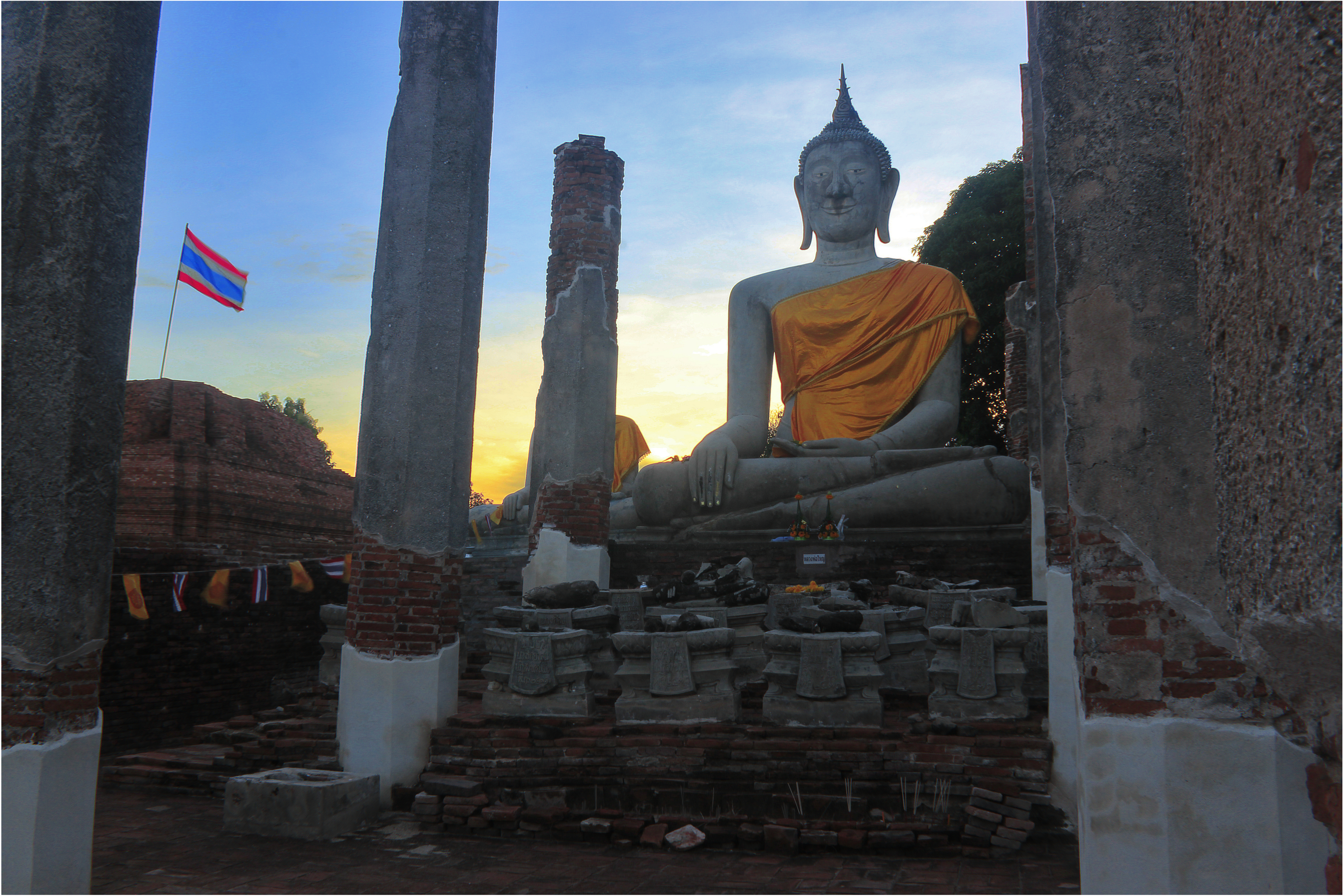
Wat Mahathat

Around Phraek Si Racha, there are many ancient towns from the Dvaravati–Lopburi period, starting from Nakhon Sawan and Chai Nat. Dong Khon (now a sub-district in Sankhaburi), about 4 km (2.5 mi) south, is an ancient town with a moat. In addition, various ancient objects have been found, including many ancient sites, indicating that this place was once a town, such as Wat Phra Kaew, Wat Mahathat, Wat Phraya Phraek, Wat Tanod Lai, etc.

Moreover, its location may also be linked to another city-state mentioned in a 12th-century Chinese document called Chen Li Fu in the Suphanburi basin.

Phraek Si Racha is also believed to be the native land of Khun San, one of the leaders of the villagers' self-defense force in the Bang Rachan Battle during the end of Ayutthaya Kingdom. He was known as a sharpshooter.

== Geography ==
The main water resource is the Noi river that flows through the eastern edge from north to south. Although it is a lowland along the waterways, it has never experienced flooding problems.

== Administration ==
The sub-district is administered by two local government bodies are Phraek Si Racha Sub-district Municipality and Sankhaburi Sub-district Municipality.

The area also consists of 16 administrative mubans (villages).

No.	Name	Thai
1.	Ban Thiang Thae	บ้านเที่ยงแท้
2.	Ban Tha Rabat	บ้านท่าระบาตร
3.	Ban Tha Rabat	บ้านท่าระบาตร
4.	Ban Tha Rabat	บ้านท่าระบาตร
5.	Ban Chong	บ้านช่อง
6.	Ban Wang Thong	บ้านวังทอง
7.	Ban Don Aranyik	บ้านดอนอรัญญิก
8.	Ban Phraek Si Racha	บ้านแพรกศรีราชา
9.	Ban Khaek	บ้านแขก
10.	Ban Wat Phra Kaew	บ้านวัดพระแก้ว
11.	Ban Wang Yao	บ้านวังยาว
12.	Ban Wang Yao	บ้านวังยาว
13.	Ban Pak Pao	บ้านปักเป้า
14.	Ban Hua Taphan	บ้านหัวตะพาน
15.	Ban Wat Kamphaeng	บ้านวัดกำแพง
16.	Ban Sa Mai Daeng	บ้านสระไม้แดง

== Population ==
As of December 2022, it has a total population of 14,586.
