= Ayutthaya Testimonies =

First edition of Khamhaikan Chao Krung Kao, published in 1914.

The Testimonies of Ayutthaya are a group of historical documents derived from an original Mon chronicle compiled following the fall of Ayutthaya in 1767. While the original Mon copy has been lost, it has been translated into several versions in Burmese, Thai and English. The Burmese versions was published as Yodaya Yazawin (ယိုးဒယားရာဇဝင် - Chronicle of Ayutthaya). The Thai versions were published as Khamhaikan Khun Luang Ha Wat (Note: Thai: คำให้การขุนหลวงหาวัด) (Testimony of the King Who Entered a Temple, referring to King Uthumphon) and Khamhaikan Chao Krung Kao (Note: คำให้การชาวกรุงเก่า) (Testimony of the Inhabitants of the Old Capital). A third document, Khamhaikan Khun Luang Wat Pradu Songtham (Note: คำให้การขุนหลวงวัดประดู่ทรงธรรม) (Testimony of the King from Wat Pradu Songtham) is similarly titled and often grouped together as part of the Testimonies, although it has different origins.

The original source of the documents is believed to be interviews of Siamese captives brought to Burma following the sack of Ayutthaya. Mon interviewers who knew the Thai language probably compiled the chronicle in Mon, and it was later translated into Burmese. There are several inconsistencies between the versions, indicating that parts had been lost and later material had been added. In their book A History of Ayutthaya, Chris Baker and Pasuk Phongpaichit regard the Testimonies' coverage from the late 17th century as "an oral history from the viewpoint of the Ayutthaya nobility".
