= Mueang Sing Historical Park =

Mueang Sing
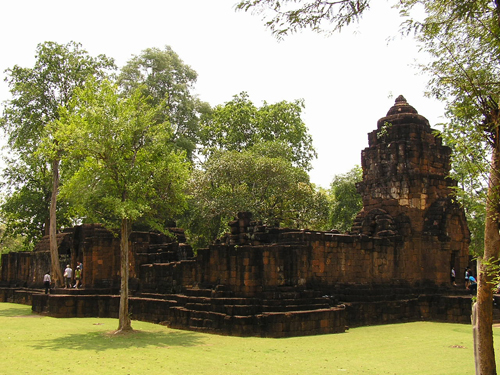

- Location in Thailand

Religion
- Affiliation: Buddhism other_info =: Sect: [[{{{sect}}}]]
- District: Sai Yok
- Province: Kanchanaburi
- Deity: Avalokiteshvara, Prajnaparamita

Location
- Location: Tambon Sing
- Country: Thailand
- Coordinates: 14°2′25″N 99°14′29″E

Architecture
- Type: Khom
- Creator: Jayavarman VII
- Completed: 1180-1219
- Temple: 2

Website
- https://www.muansinghp.com/

Mueang Sing (Thai: เมืองสิงห์, pronounced [mɯ̄a̯ŋ sǐŋ]) is a historical park in Sai Yok District, Kanchanaburi Province, Thailand. It protects the remains of two Khmer temples dating to the 13th and 14th centuries. It was declared a historical park in 1987.

== History ==
The history of the site goes back to the period between 857 and 1157, a period when the Khmer Kingdom was flourishing. Records show that the town was abandoned until the reign of King Rama I. The name Mueang Sing first showed in the chronicles of the reign of King Rama I (1782–1809), when it was a fortified town protecting the town Kanchanaburi. In the reform of provincial administration at the end of the 19th century its status was reduced from Mueang to Tambon (commune).

The site was first designated as an archaeological monument in 1935 (Royal Gazette, Book 52, S. 75, 8 March 1935) and defined in its extension following survey work between 1960 and 1962 (Royal Gazette, Book 77, S. 60, 29 June 1960). After excavation and conservation work starting in 1974, the site was opened to the public as a historical park on 3 April 1997.

== Site ==
The site of the entire, not fully excavated city covers a rectangular area of 880 m (2,890 ft) East-to-West by 1,400 m (4,600 ft) North-to-South extending in the south along the course of the Khwae Noi river. It is enclosed by a 7 m (23 ft) high laterite wall and four parallel moats and ramparts with a gate in the center of each section.

Four monuments are located along the center North-South axis. Monument 1, a prasat temple is in the center of the area. Northwest of this are the foundations of a second temple building (Monument 2). Monuments 3 and 4 towards the South, West of the main North-South road are foundations of buildings, whose purpose is not clear.

== Architecture ==
Built in the Bayon style, the temples date to the Khmer kingdom in the reign of King Jayavarman VII (1180–1219). A stone inscription of Prince Vira Kumara praising his father, 23 cities are named. One of these cities was named Srichaiya Singhapura, which some scholars identify with Mueang Sing.

== Prehistoric burials ==
At the South-Eastern edge outside the city wall on the river bank, remains of four individuals have been excavated, which were dated to the late Metal age, c. 200 CE. The individuals were buried with clay pots and jewelry made from shells and stone- and glass beads.

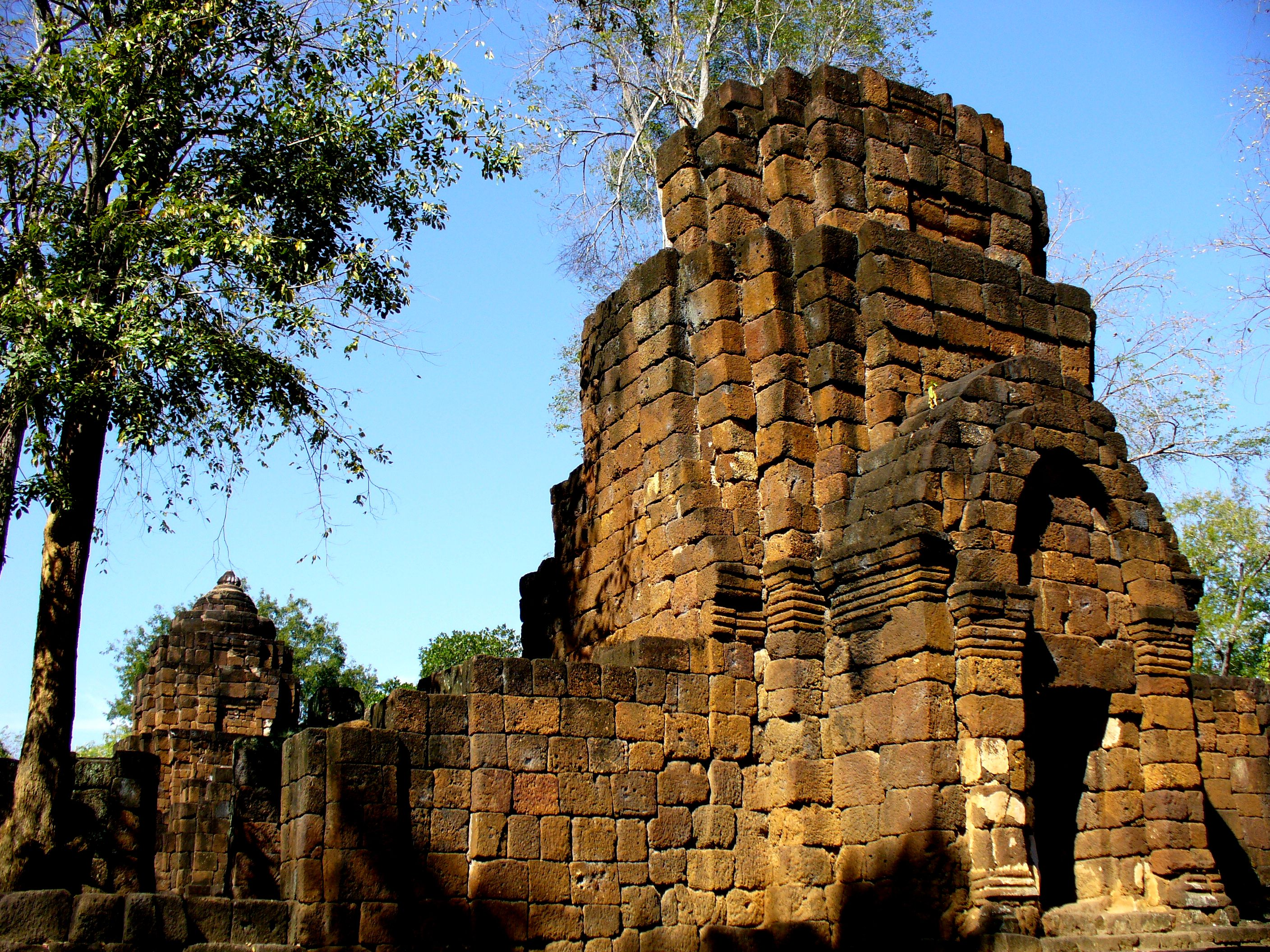
Prasat Muang Sing Historical Park

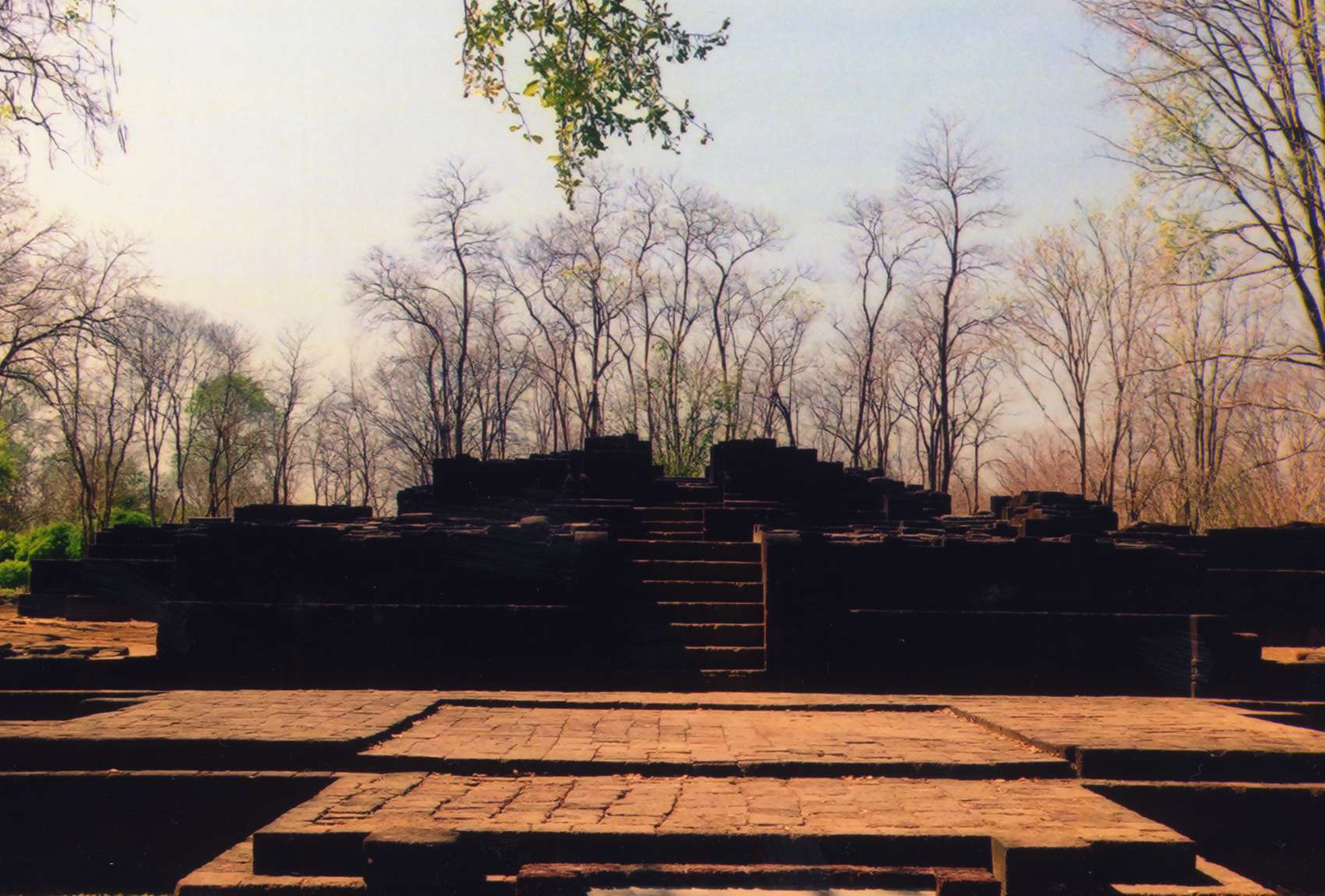
Monument 2 at the Prasat Muang Sing Historical Park
