= Suphannabhum =

Former kingdom in central Thailand

Suphannabhum Kingdom แคว้นสุพรรณภูมิ (Thai) Khwaen Suphannaphum
- 913 – 1438
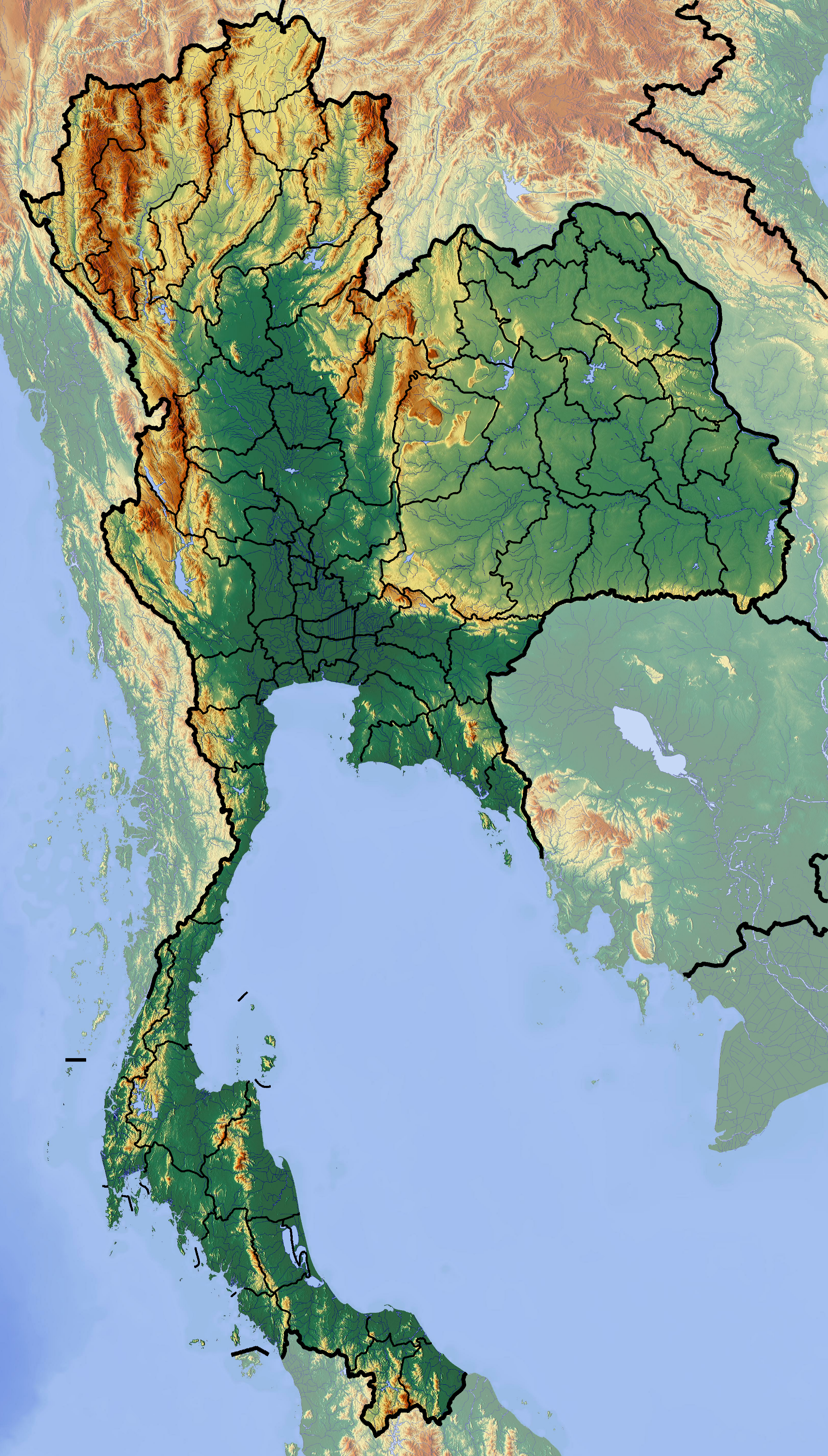
- Location of Suphanburi, the center of Suphannabhum (red pog), and the preceding Mueang Uthong (blue pog)
- The present map of Suphan Buri shows the old moat on the west side of the city-state of Suphannabhum. The eastern moat has been destroyed. Its total size before the formation of Ayutthaya Kingdom was 1900x3600 meters and it straddled the Tha Chin River in a north-south direction.
- Capital: Suphanburi
- Monarch
  - 877–? (first): Pansa
  - 1408–1424 (last): Chao Ai Phraya
- Historical era: Post-classical era
  - Under Nakhon Pathom: 877–913
  - Independent: 913
  - Lavo seized Suphannabhum: 928/929
  - Suphannabhum/ Haripuñjaya seized Lavo: 1052
  - Tributary of Sukhothai: 1283–1298
  - Joined federation with Lavo and formed Ayutthaya Kingdom: 1351
  - Claimed Ayutthaya throne: 1370
  - Lost Ayutthaya to Lavo: 1388
  - Reclaimed Ayutthaya: 1424
  - Annexed to Ayutthaya: 1438
  - First Fall of Ayutthaya: 1569
Preceded by
Kamalanka
Chen Li Fu
Lavo
Phetchaburi
She Ba Ruo
Dvaravati
Succeeded by
Ayutthaya Kingdom
- Today part of: Thailand

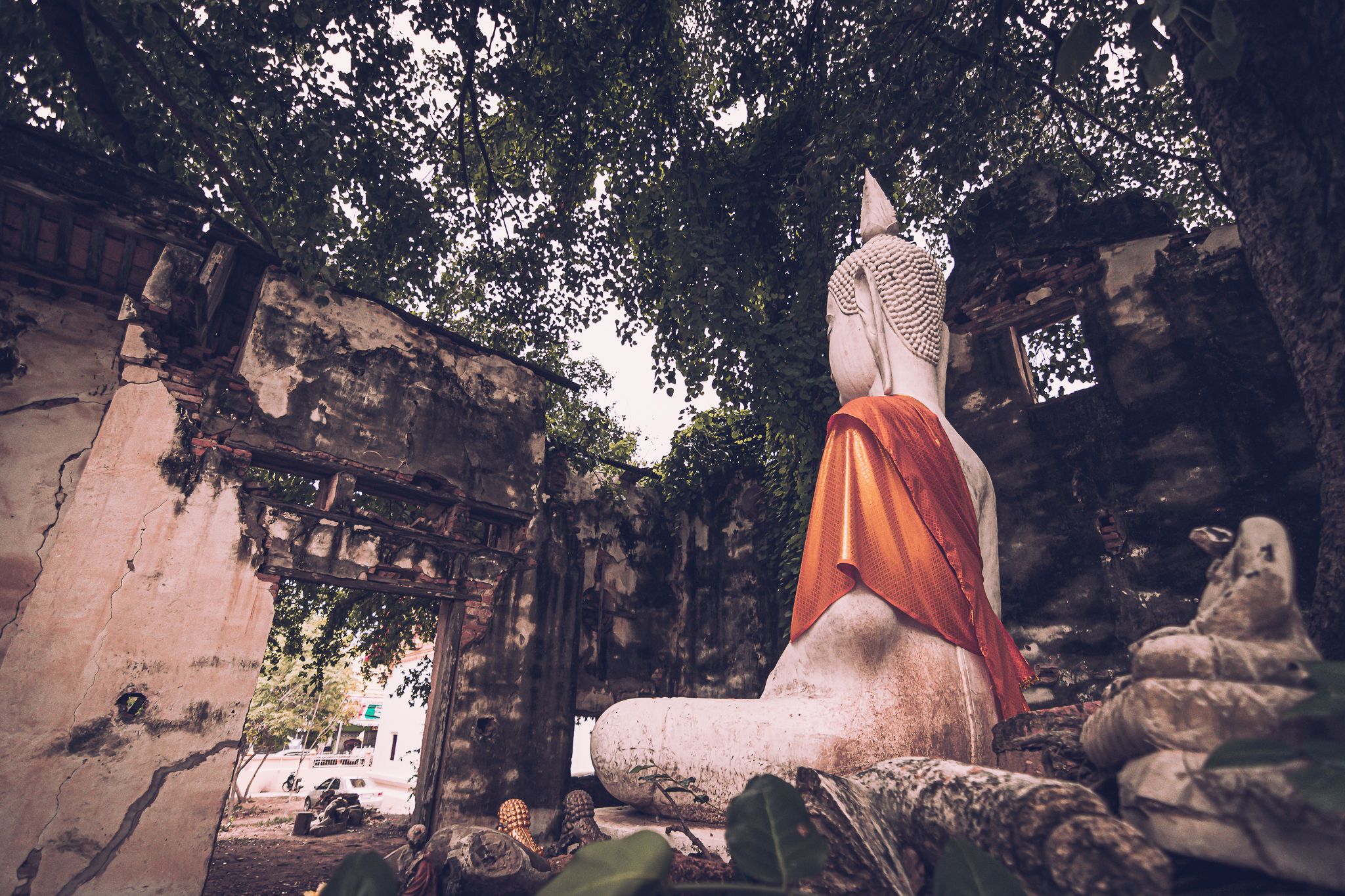
Ancient ruin in Wat Phra Roob, Mueang Suphan Buri, dates to the Dvaravati period.

Suphannabhum or Suvarnabhumi; later known as Suphan Buri (Thai: สุพรรณภูมิ or สุพรรณบุรี) was a Siamese city-state, that emerged in the early "Siam proper" which stretched from present-day west central Thailand to the north of the Kra Isthmus, with key historical sites at Uthong, Nakhon Pathom, Suphan Buri, and Ban Don Ta Phet. The kingdom is referred to as Xiān in the Chinese records since 1349, but according to the archaeological evidence in Suphan Buri, it was speculated to have emerged around the mid-12th century. However, a calculation made by Borihan Thepthani based on the information provided in the Northern Chronicle says that the city of Suphan Buri was founded in 877 and became a free city-state after its suzerain, Nakhon Pathom of Kamalanka, fell to Phetchaburi in 913. Japanese scholar Tatsuo Hoshino has proposed that Suphannabhum was identified in Chinese sources as Shě Bá Ruò (舍跋若), which he further interprets as the western terminus of a trans-Mekong trade confederation in the 9th century. According to this hypothesis, the confederation comprised five polities: Pó Àn (婆岸), identified with Mueang Phon; Zhān Bó, associated with Champasri; Qiān Zhī Fú, identified with Si Thep; Mó Là (摩臘), located in the coastal region of Champa; and Shě Bá Ruò, corresponding to Suphanburi.

Suphannabhum became the center of Xiān, succeeding Phip Phli, no later than 1349, when Xiān was defeated by Luó hú (Lavo) and the tribute sent to China under the name of Xiānluó hú (Siam-Lavo or Ayutthaya Kingdom) was led by Xiān's King of Su-men-bang, in which Su-men-bang has been identified with Suphanburi. Since then, it was one of the states under the mandala confederation of Ayutthaya Kingdom and was completely merged to the Ayutthaya in 1438. However, modern scholars suggest Xiān mentioned in the Chinese and Đại Việt sources since the 11th century potentially was Ayodhya, a polity that later known as the Ayutthaya Kingdom (Xiānluó hú or Xiānluó) in the mid-14th century.

Under the name of Xiānluó hú or Xiānluó, the state performed 41 tributary missions to the Chinese court during the Hongwu era, 33 in the name of Xiānluó hú and as Xiānluó for the remaining. In the era of Ankorian king Jayavarman VII (r.1181–1218), an inscription called Prasat Phra Khan (จารึกปราสาทพระขรรค์) was made, among others, the name Suvarnapura is mentioned, which has been identified with Suphanburi.

Modern scholars believe Suphannabhum was Chen Li Fu mentioned in the Chinese Sung Hui Yao Kao in 1200 and 1205.

== History ==
According to the local legends, Suphannabhum is the succeeding state of an ancient port city of Mueang Uthong, which evolved into complex state societies around 300 C.E. Since the river leading to the sea was dried up in places, shallow, and consequently not navigable, and also due to some pandemics, Uthong lost its influence as the trading hub; the city was then abandoned around the 11th century and the people then moved to resettle in the present day Suphanburi. This timeline corresponds with that the Tambralinga's king Sujita seized Lavo and was said to conquer the Mons of the Menam Valley and the upper Malay peninsula in the 10th century, the 9-year civil wars in the Angkor in the early 11th century, which led to the devastation of Lavo, as well as the Pagan invasion of Lavo around the mid-10th century. All of these are probably the causes of the fall of Mueang Uthong.

=== Dvaravati period: Suvarnabhumi ===
This region has been claimed to be the legendary Suvarnabhumi by several local scholars. Numerous ruins and artifacts from the Dvaravati period have been discovered around the area. However, contemporary documents from this period are sparse; the available material consists primarily of local chronicles and legends.

Paul Wheatley suggests that the city-state of Chin Lin which was mentioned in the Chinese archives of the Liang dynasty as the state that was Fan Man, the Great King of Funan Kingdom, attempt to conquer in the 4th century CE, might be located in west central Thailand, since the word "Chin Lin" 金鄰/金邻 means "Land of Gold" or "Suvarnabhumi"; as mentioned in the archive, it was a state located approximately 2,000 li (800 kilometers) west of the Funan Kingdom, which corresponded to the area where is now central Thailand.

According to the Northern Chronicle, the region's political center from the 9th to 12th centuries was located at the old Kanchanaburi city ruins but local legends suggest it was in the old town Nakhon Pathom (formerly known as Nakhon Chaisri), which has been speculated to be the center of Dvaravati. As per Chalerm Kanchanakam's calculations based on the text provided in the Yonok Chronicle, which states that Phraya Phan, the founder of Suphan Buri, ascended to rule Haripuñjaya in 913, it is estimated that Suphan Buri was founded around 877–883.

George Cœdès believed that Mueang Uthong was the center of the Dvaravati civilization.

=== Post-Dvaravati: Suphannabhum ===
After the end of the ancient maritime-oriented port era and the decline of Dvaravati, Suphannabhum then emerged around the mid-12th century following the prosperity of Lavo Kingdom and the Ankorian during the reign of Jayavarman VII and the influx of people from the north. This has been supported by several ancient ruins in the area that dates before the Ayutthaya period; two of them are the Ankorian Bayon style and the other two are the Indian Pala-Sena architects, which are also found in Lavo, Pagan, and Haripuñjaya.

According to the Northern Chronicle, the city of Suphanburi existed before the mid-12 century since King Kar Tayy, who was of the Mon's Pagan Saw Lu lineage and ruled Kanchanaburi (some versions say Nakhon Chaisri) from 1165 to 1205, ordered his relative to build a temple in Phanthumburi (พันธุมบุรี) and renamed the city to Songphanburi (สองพันบุรี; present-Suphanburi). Katae's reign ended around the same time that Phrip Phri's king, Mahesvastidrādhirājakṣatriya or Pra Poa Noome Thele Seri (พระพนมทะเลศรี), who was also father of King Uthong II of Lavo's Ayodhya, expanded his power northward to Phraek Si Racha (in present-day Chai Nat) in 1204 and sent his praeceptor to govern. The area he conquered also encompassed Suphannabhum and the proposed region of Chen Li Fu. The younger prince, Soi La or U Thong I, was then enthroned as a new Suphannabhum's king.

The 12th century Prasat Phra Khan Inscription (จารึกปราสาทพระขรรค์) marks the prosperity and civilization of this region by mentioning four major cities in the Suphannabhum area, including Suphanburi, Samphukapatthana, Ratburi, and Phetburi. One of these, Suphanburi, gradually controlled the economy of all Tha Chin Rivers and raised its power until being annexed to the Sukhothai Kingdom in 1283, as recorded in the Ram Khamhaeng Inscription. However, after the death of Sukhothai's Ram Khamhaeng in 1298, several tributary states of Sukhothai, which included Suphannabhum, began to break away rapidly. Via Royal intermarriage, Suphannabhum united with the eastern neighboring Lavo Kingdom, to establish a confederated polity seat in Ayodhya in 1351. Suphannabhum gained recognition in the mid-13th century when the state leaders named ‘Khun Laung Pao Ngouy’ (later Ayutthaya's Borommarachathirat I) and ‘Jao Nakhon In’ (later Ayutthaya's Intharacha) extended their political economy influence to Ayutthaya.

In the early Ayutthaya period, Suphannabhum was ruled by the Ayutthaya's crown princes. It was demoted to the frontier city and was completely annexed to Ayutthaya in 1438. Since then, Suphannabhum has been completely restricted in terms of both economics and politics, particularly in terms of trade with China and establishing relations with other cities, because it was determined to have relations only with the capital, acting as a military base and producing tribute for the capital. These transformed Suphannabhum into an agricultural area to supply Ayutthaya for export.

Loe Thai
□
Uthong	□	Baromaraja I	Princess	Lithai
Ramesuan	Thong Lan	Sri Thephahurat	Intharacha I	Princess	Luethai
Ramracha	Chao Sam Phraya	Devi	Saileuthai
Trailok	Phaya Ram	Boromapan

Left chart shows the royal intermarriage between the Suphannabhum dynasty of Suphan Buri and the Uthong dynasty of Lavo Kingdom, which led to the formation of the Ayutthaya Kingdom. The close connection between the Suphannabhum dynasty and the Sukhothai dynasty has also been observed.

Uthong dynasty of Lavo
Suphannabhum dynasty of Suphanburi
Phra Ruang (Sukhothai) dynasty of Sukhothai

== Dynasties ==
=== Legends and chronicles related to Kings U Thong I–V ===
==== Uthong I and his brother ====
According to the Northern Chronicle, the throne at Phanthumburi (พันธุมบุรี, present-day Suphanburi) was empty following the reign of King Kar Tayy; r. 1123–1163), who was of the Pagan lineage and ruled the polity during Pagan domination of the upper Malay peninsula during the late 11th to 12th centuries. To the north, Uthong I and his brother moved south from Mueang Chaliang (the 1684 Instructions Given to the Siamese Envoys Sent to Portugal says they were from Soucouttae, whereas the Du Royaume de Siam says Locontàï). Uthong I, the younger brother, then took over the empty throne, and the older prince, Pprappanom Tteleiseri or Mahesvastidrādhirājakṣatriya moved further south and became King of Phrip Phri. Du Royaume de Siam, by Simon de la Loubère, gives the date of the enthronement of Pprappanom Tteleiseri at Phetchaburi as around 1188. Meanwhile, Dhanit Yupho provides the date that this dynasty began to rule Thepnakhòn (or Devanagara), which corresponds to Suphanburi, as 1163. The story related to the older prince is also mentioned in the southern Nakhon Si Thammarat Chronicle says Mahesvastidrādhirājakṣatriya, who was also the father of Uthong II, the king of Xiān's Ayodhya, extended his territory north and south. To the north reached Phraek Si Racha, where he appointed his praeceptor as the governor, annexed Chen Li Fu in 1204, and Mahīđharavarman III who was believed to have some relation with the Mahidharapura Kingdoms in the Phimai region, enthroned as the new king. To the south, he encountered Tambralinga in 1196, but the dispute ended with the negotiation and the establishment of the royal relationship. His younger son, U Thong II, became the king of Ayodhya in 1205, and the older prince Thonglanrach (r. ?–1289) succeeded him at Phetchaburi. Through a dynastic relationship, another prince, Phanomwang (พนมวัง), moved south to revive Ligor following the fall of Tambralinga in the 14th century.

==== Uthong II and the two contested theories of origin ====
As it says in the Nakhon Si Thammarat Chronicle, King of Xiān's Ayodhya named U Thong (II) was the son of Pprappanom Tteleiseri, king of Phrip Phri; therefore, He may have been a distinct monarch from U Thong (I), the King of Suphannaphum, who was the younger sibling of Pprappanom Tteleiseri, referenced in the Northern Chronicle. Even in contrast to several chronicles, a Thai scholar, Manit Wallipodom, claims that U Thong (II) of Ayodhya (r. 1205–1253) was the son of the predecessor Dhammikaraja. The succession to the Ayodhya throne of U Thong II is told in the British Museum version of the Royal Chronicle of the Kingdom of Siam that the King of Kampoch (Ayodhya), potentially King Dhammikaraja who reigned from 1165 to 1205, died with no male heir, the nobles then offered the throne to a plutocrat Uthong II, who then relocated the city to the south due to the endemics. This conforms to the text given in the Northern Chronicle that says the son of a Chinese mercenary named Uthong became the new ruler of Ayodhya. Thus, Uthong II was potentially the son of Pprappanom Tteleiseri, who was born to a Chinese queen. Before becoming King of Ayodhya, U Thong II was the king of Devanagara, succeeding his uncle U Thong I.

==== Suphannaphum clan: a new dynasty by U Thong III–IV ====
Several evidence regards the dynasty of Kings U Thong I–II, such as the movement of Pprappanom Tteleiseri from Yassouttora Nacoora Louang or Tasoo Nacora Louang — which several scholars identified with Lavo — to the upper Menam Valley at Soucouttae–Locontàï, the appointment of Mahīđharavarman III — who had some dynastic relations with the Mahidharapura Kingdoms to the east of Lavo – as a new king of Chen Li Fu, and a political asylum of Ramesuan to Lavo after lost Ayutthya throne to Suphannuphum dynasty in 1370, show a strong connection between this dynasty and the Lavo Kingdom in the eastern Menam Valley. Whereas, the latter Kings U Thong III–IV, who were the predecessors of Borommarachathirat I, the first Ayutthaya king from the Suphannaphum dynasty, instead show the relation with the Sukhothai Kingdom to the north in both royal intermarriage, political movements, and architectural styles; thus the origin of this dynasty may be linked to Sukhothai. During the reign of U Thong III, Suphannabhum was listed in the Ram Khamhaeng Inscription as one of Sukhothai vassals.

The presupposition mentioned above conforms to a local legend of Thao Saenpom, a commoner who married a princess of Trai Trueng — a city which was built by Singhanavati 's Chaiyasiri in 1000 and was later under the Sukhothai Kingdom — but both were expelled by the king of Trai Trueng. They moved south and established Thepnakhòn (or Devanagara; เทพนคร), which Dhanit Yupho equates with Suphanburi. His son U Thong (III) succeeded him. Some argues Thao Saenpom was not a commoner but instead a prince of Sri Vijaya (present-day Nakhon Pathom or Sumbuka of Kamalanka). Dhanit Yupho instead says Suphanburi was ruled by the same dynasty (Lavo dynasty) since the reign of King U Thong I in 1163 to the establishment of the Ayutthaya Kingdom in 1351, and additionally asserts that this dynasty ruled Trai Trueng from 1004 to 1163, then moved the seat to Suphanburi. King Rama VI even identified U Thong (III), son of Saenpom, with U Thong (V), who was the first Ayutthyan king. However, the theory that says U Thong V of the Uthong dynasty (later known as Lavo dynasty) was from the western Valley has been proven to be false.

==== Emergence of Ayutthaya by U Thong V ====
Previously, scholars believed U Thong V or Ramatibodi I, the first Ayutthaya King, was from Mueang Uthong, the predecessor of Suphanburi in the western valley. However, later historical document studies revealed that he was of the Lavo in the eastern plain. Due to U Thong IV having no male heir, U Thong V, who married a princess of King U Thong III, took over the Suphanburi throne in 1341. One year later, U Thong V was appointed by his father, Boromracha — who ruled Xiān's Ayodhya — as the governor of Phetchaburi. However, Boromracha was ordained as a monk in 1344 and appointed U Thong V as regent, making U Thong V the ruler of all early Siamese polities, including Suphanburi, Phetchaburi, and Ayodhya. He also relocated Ayodhya to the present Phra Nakhon Si Ayutthaya; this new city took 8 years to complete. After that, U Thong V was enthroned as the first Ayutthaya King by uniting all principalities in the lower Menam Valley in 1350/1351. He appointed his queen consort's older brother, Borommarachathirat I, to rule Suphanburi.

=== Suphannabhum clan origin ===
The origin of the Suphannabhum dynasty remains unclear. Previous scholars believed that the first king of the Ayutthaya Kingdom, later called by modern historians King Uthong, once ruled the city of Uthong, but the theory has been proven to be false. It was expected that Khun Laung Pho Ngouy, who was later known as the 3rd Ayutthaya' king Borommarachathirat I – the first king from Suphannabhum clan, might have lineage from Sukhothai as he married a princess in Sukhothai's Loe Thai and royal intermarriages between his descendants and the Sukhothai dynasty happened multiple times. Furthermore, political movements and architectural styles in Suphanburi during the Ayutthaya period demonstrate a tight relationship between these two dynasties. The kinship between the royal families of Suphanburi and Sukhothai probably existed for a long time, at least since the reign of the Sukhothai's king Ramkhamhaeng.

Local legends say Khun Laung Pho Ngouy is a descendant of Khun In (ขุนอิน), while the Ayutthaya Kingdom's 1st king, Uthong, is a descendant of Khun Kham Phong (ขุนคำผง) founder of Singhanavati's capital Yonok Nahaphan. Both Khun In and Khun Kham Phong are two of seven sons of Khun Borom, a legendary progenitor of the Southwestern Tai-speaking peoples. Simon de la Loubère's record, Du royaume de Siam, refers to the first Siamese king as a descendant of Chaiyasiri, son of a legendary King Phrom of the Singhanavati clan.

The early era of the Suphannabhum dynasty and its relations with other royal families in the lower Chao Phraya Valley from the 10th century to the formation of the Ayutthaya Kingdom is shown below.

King of Suphannabhum
King of Phetchaburi
King of Lavo's Ayodhya–Phetchaburi
King of Ayutthaya–Suphannabhum
King of Lavo's Lopburi
King of Lavo's Ayodhya (formerly "Mueang Nong Son" or "Mueang Wat Derm")
King of Ayutthaya
King of Nakhon Si Thammarat
King of Lavo's Ayodhya–Lopburi
King of Lavo's Ayodhya–Suphannabhum
King of Ayutthaya–Phetchaburi

Timeline and family tree of Thai monarchs in the lower Chao Phraya Valley from the 6th century to the formation of the Ayutthaya Kingdom

Invented Chula Sakarat	Kakapat/Sakkorndam (กากะพัตร/สักกรดำ); King of Kamalanka r. 566–638	Bhavavarman I or II of Chenla or Bhavavarman of Si Thep
Ramaraj (รามราช); King of Ramburi (Ayodhyapura?/ Mawlamyine?) r. 648?–?	Camadevi (จามเทวี); Queen of Haripuñjaya r. 622–629	Kalavarnadishraj (กาฬวรรณดิศราช); King of Kamalanka r. 638–648; King of Lavo r. 648–700	Sri Sap ศรีทรัพย์ King of Kamalanka r. 648–?	ᛱ Princess of Chenla or Si Thep
Continue to the Camadevi dynasty of Haripuñjaya	Several generations	Continue to the Lavo dynasty of Lavo Kingdom	Sikaraj (สิการาช); King of Kamalanka r. ?–807
From Mueang Bang Than (บางทาน), Kamphaeng Phet	Uchitajakraphad (อุฉิฎฐกะจักรวรรดิ) r. ?–927/928; Later King of Haripuñjaya	Continue to the Lavo dynasty of Haripuñjaya	Kong กง; King of Kamalanka r. 807–867
Maha Phutthasakorn (พระมหาพุทธสาคร); Founder of Mueang Wat Derm r. 934–964 (Note: Calculated from the text given in the chronicle: "สิ้น 97 ปีสวรรคต ศักราชได้ 336 ปี พระยาโคดมได้ครองราชสมบัติอยู่ ณ วัดเดิม 30 ปี" which is transcribed as "...at the age of 97, he passed away in the year 336 of the Chula Sakarat. Phraya Kodom reigned in the Mueang Wat Derm for 30 years...".)	Tambralinga conquered of Lavo in 927/928, Lavo' king Uchitajakraphad fled to Haripuñjaya	King of Phetchaburi conquered Kamalanka's Nakhon Pathom	Phan พาน/พาลราช; King of Kamalanka r. 867–913; Also King of Haripuñjaya (r. 913–916)
Kottabong โคตรตะบอง; Ruler of Mueang Wat Derm r. 964–983	Sujita (สุชิตราช/ชีวกะ/วรราช); King of Tambralinga (r. ?–1003?); King of Lavo (r. 927/928)	Lavo led by Sujita seized Suphannabhum, Chandrachota and Thamikaraj fled to Tak and Haripuñjaya.	Pansa (พระพรรษา) r. 877–?	Several generations
Usurper
Sinthapomarinthra Kraek (สินทพอมรินทร แกรก); Ruler of Mueang Wat Derm r. 983–1042 (59 yrs)	Devastation of Lavo due to the 1002–1010 Angkorian Civil Wars	Kampoch (กัมโพช) r. 927/928–?	Lavo led by Kampoch attacked Haripuñjaya in 930/931 but failed.	Chandra Devaraja (จันทรเทวราช) (r. ?–927?)
Narai I of Lavo claimed the throne and moved the Lavo seat to "Mueang Wat Derm" then renamed the city "Ayodhya"	Angkorin king, Suryavarman I, destroyed Lavo's Lavapura in 1002.	Sri Lakshmi Pativarman (ศรีลักษมีปติวรมัน) r. 1006–1052? (Appointed by Suryavarman I)	Suphannabhum and Haripuñjaya seized Lavo in 1052	Ramapandita (รามบัณฑิตย์) r. 40 yrs	Internal political turmoil
Pagan dynasty	Unknown origin Haripuñjaya?	Thamikaraj (อาทิตตะราช/อาทิตยธรรมิกราช); King of Haripuñjaya	Anga Indra (องค์อินทร์) r. 1128?–1163?
Anawrahta; King of Pagan r.1044-1077	Agga Mahethi (แก้วประพาฬ); 1015-1080	Singhanavati dynasty	Patima; Sudhaduangchan (ปฏิมาสุดาดวงจันทร์)	Chandrachota (จันทรโชติ) r.1052-1069	1058 Pagan invasion of Lavo and lower Chao Phraya basin
Saw Lu; King of Pagan r. 1077-1084	Pangkharaj; King of Singhanavati r. 915–?	1087 Pagan invasion of Lavo and lower Chao Phraya basin	Lavo's capital was shifted to Ayodhaya and entered the Xiān era	Narai I (นารายณ์) r.1082–1087 (No heir)	Suvacanaraja (สุพจราช); King of Si Satchanalai
Kar Tayy (กาแต) r. 1163?–1203?	Dhukkhita; King of Singhanavati	Kaewsupha (แก้วสุภา); Princess of Wiang Chai Narai	Sridham Tripiṭaka (Phrom) ศรีธรรมไตรปิฏก; King of Chiang Saen	Pathumdevi (ปทุมเทวี)	Dharmatriloka; King of Si Satchanalai
Fall of Singhanavati
Unknown; 1st Tritrueng's King (r. 1000–?)	From Wiang Phang Kham
Unknown; Princess	Chaiyasiri; Ruler of Wiang Chai; Prakan and Nacontai r. 1089–1107	1087–1089 Ayodhya's civil wars	Chatisakorn (ชาติสาคร); Ruler of Chiang Rai
From Xiū Luó Fēn family
Soi La/Uthong I (พระยาสร้อยหล้า/อู่ทอง) r. 1163 or 1203?–1205	Pprappanom Tteleiseri (พนมทะเลศรี/ พนมไชยศิริ); Ruler of Phetchaburi r. 1188–1225	Luang (พระเจ้าหลวง) r. 1089–1111	Kesariraja (ไกรศรราช) r. 1106–1115? Also King of Si Satchanalai	Suladevi (สุลเทวี); Princess of Si Satchanalai
Unknown; 2nd Tritrueng's King; Ex-king of Phraek Si Racha r. 1283–1319	Sadieng Thong; Princes of Tritrueng	Phanomwang; Ruler of Nakhon Si Thammarat r. 1342–?	Phra Ratchadevi (พระราชเทวี)/ Dara Ratchathewi (ดาราราชเทวี)	Sai Nam Peung (สายน้ำผึ้ง) r. 1111–1165	Unknown (Mon)
Son Sai (สนไส้/จันทรเทวีศรีรัตนฉายา)	Sri Maharacha; Ex-ruler of Sa U Lao; King of Nakhon Si Thammarat	Sontra; Ruler of Na Tranom	Dhammikaraja (ธรรมิกราชา) r. 1165–1205	Siri Pracha Ratchathewi (ศิริประชาราชเทวี)	Sri Thammasokkarat (ศรีธรรมโศกราช) r. 1115?–1181
Narupatidnavarman (Later Indravarman II) r. 1181?–1218 (Appointed by Jayavarman VII)	Sri Thammasokaraj dynasty of Nakhon; Si Thammarat	Kuman; Ruler of Tathong	Uthong II; Ex-ruler of Thep Nakhon Chaisiri; Ex-king of Uthong r. 1205–1253	Thonglanrach (ท้องลันราช); Ruler of (Phetchaburi)r.1225–?	Probably fled to Nakhon Si Thammarat due to the political pressure from the Angkor
3rd Tritrueng King	Ai (อ้าย); Ruler of Mueang Nakhon (Ligor?)	Yi (ยี่); Ruler of Tanintharyi	Sam (สาม); Ruler of Phetchaburi r. early 1300s	Sukhandhakhiri (สุคนธคีรี); King of Phichai Chiang Mai r. ?–1289
Unknown; Princess	Saen Pom; Prince of Sri Vijaya? or Khom Sabat Khlon Lamphong r. mid 13th-c.	Suvacanaraja (พัตตาสุจราช); King of Si Satchanalai	Chaithat (ชัยทัต)	Unknown; Princess	Jayasena (ชัยเสน); Ayodhya: r. 1253–1289; Phichai Chiang Mai: r.1289–?
Boromtrilok (บรมไตรโลก)	Dharmatriloka (ธรรมไตรโลก); King of Si Satchanalai	Suvarnaraja (สุวรรณราชา) r. 1289–1301
U Thong III (พระเจ้าอู่ทอง) r. ?–1335?	Rajadhiraj II (ราชาธิราชที่ 2); King of Si Satchanalai	Dhammaraja (ธรรมราชา) r. 1301–1310	Kalaya Devi (กัลยาเทวี)
U Thong IV (พระยาอู่ทอง) r. 1335?–1341	Baramaraja (บรมราชา) r. 1310–1344	Sunantha Devi (สุนันทาเทวี)
Unknown; Suphannabhum Princess	Ramathibodi I (Uthong V); King of Phip Phli (r.1325–1351); King of Suphannaphum (r.1341–1351); King of Ayodhya (r. 1344–1351); 1st king of Ayutthaya r. 1351–1369	Unknown; Lavo Princess
Ba Sat; King of Angkor r. 1352–1356	Ba Aat; King of Angkor r. 1356–1357	Kadum Bongphisi; King of Angkor r. 1357	Ramesuan; 2nd king of Ayutthaya; 1st: r. 1369–1370; 2nd: 1388–1395
Sukhothai dynasty
Lavo dynasty of Ayutthaya
Maha Thammaracha II; King of Sukhothai r. 1368–1399	Daughter of Loe Thai (Sukhothai Kingdom)	Pha Ngua; 3rd king of Ayutthaya; Ex-ruler of Suphannabhum r. 1370–1388	Unknown; Princess
Phra Ruang dynasty of Sukhothai	Suphannabhum dynasty of Ayutthaya

== List of rulers ==
Rulers		Clan	Reign	Notes/Contemporary events
Romanized name	Thai name	Clan	Reign	Notes/Contemporary events
Pansa	พรรษา	Sikaraj	916 – early 10th.-c.	At Suphan Buri seat
Pansa	พรรษา	Sikaraj	Early 10th.-c. – 1006	At Mueang Uthong seat
Chandra Devaraja	จันทรเทวราช	Ramanwamsa	Early 10th.-c.–940s?	At Suphan Buri seat
Tambralinga's king Sujita from Lavo sacked Suphannabhum in the late 920s. Two Suphannabhum princes, Thamikaraj (later king of Haripuñjaya) and Chadachota (later king of Lavo), fled to Haripuñjaya, the kingdom that was once ruled by their ancestor, King Pan.
Chola invaded Kamalanka and lower Menam Valley in 1030.
Ramapandita	รามบัณฑิตย์	Ramanwamsa	1006–1046	At Mueang Uthong seat
Political Insurgency
Anga Indra	องค์อินทร์		1046–1081	At Mueang Uthong seat
Political Insurgency/ Bagan invaded lower Menam Basin and 1058.
Kar Tayy	กาแต	Pagan	1081 – early 12th.-c.	At Mueang Uthong seat
Kar Tayy	กาแต	Pagan	Early 12th.-c. – 1121	At the Suphan Buri seat; Marked as the end of Dvaravati in the western valley
Vacant			1121–1163	Mueang Uthong has been abandoned since Kar Tayy moved the seat to Suphan Buri.
Soi La/Uthong I (Note: Based on legend.)	พระยาสร้อยหล้า	Singhanavati	1163 – 1205	Xiān period begins; Son of Chaiyasiri/Chaisiri.; Younger brother of Phanom Thalesri, King of Phip Phli; No male heir left
Uthong II		Lavo	1205–1253?	Son of Phanom Thalesri, King of Phip Phli; Also king of Lavo's Ayodhya (r.1205–1253); Governed from Ayodhya
Vacant
Suphan Buri was a tributary state of the Sukhothai Kingdom from 1283–1298.
Saenpom	ท้าวแสนปม		Mid 13th century	Based on legend; Possibly prince of Sri Vijaya (Sambuka of Kamalanka) who married princess of Trai Trueng.; Some identified him with Khom Sabat Khlon Lamphong
Phra Chao Uthong (Uthong III) (Note: U Thong is a title used to refer to the kings or rulers of Mueang Uthong of Lavo-Suphanburi, similar to the titles Phra Ruang (พระร่วง), the rulers of the Sukhothai Kingdom, and Phra Chao Sri Thammasokaraja (พระเจ้าศรีธรรมาโศกราช) of the Sri Thammasokaraja Kingdom.)	พระเจ้าอู่ทอง	Suphannaphum	?–1335?	Father(-in-law) of Khun Laung Pho Ngouy?; Father? of the 1st Ayutthaya's king, Uthong. (r.1351–1369); Possibly son of Saen Pom แสนปม (Sirichai Chiangsean), who married a princess of Trai Trueng, which made Suphannabhum a tributary state of the Sukhothai Kingdom during 1283–1298 via royal relations.
Phraya Uthong (Uthong IV)	พระยาอู่ทอง	Suphannaphum	1335?–1341	Son of the previous. No male heir.
Ramathibodi I (Uthong V)	พระเจ้าอู่ทอง	Lavo	1341–1351	Son-in-law of Uthong III.
Foundation of the Ayutthaya Kingdom (1351)
Khun Laung Pho Ngouy (formerly Wattidet)	ขุนหลวงพ่องั่ว/วัตติเดช	Suphannaphum	1351–1370	Possible son(-in-law) of Uthong III. Later became the 3rd Ayutthaya's king, Borommarachathirat I. (r.1370–1388)
Sri Thephahurat?	ศรีเทพาหูราช?	Suphannaphum	1370–1374	Younger brother or son of Borommarachathirat I, and also Chao Nakhon In's father or relatives.; Born into the Suphannaphum dynasty father and Sukhothai dynasty mother.
Chao Nakhon In; Zhao Lu-qun Ying	เจ้านครอินทร์	Suphannaphum	1374–1408	Also the crown prince of Xiānluó.; Later became the 6th Ayutthaya's king, Intharacha. (r.1408–1424; offered crown); Sent several tributes to China, sometimes in the name of Suphanburi.: An emissary Zhao Xi-li Zhi from Xiānluó visit China in 1374.; The crown prince, Zhao Lu-qun Ying, as Xiānluó's envoy, visit China in 1377.; King Can-lie Bao Pi-ya Si-li Duo-luo-lu of Xiānluó sent Ya-la-er Wen-zhi-li and others to present the tribute to China in 1379.; Ya-la-er Wen-zhi-li was sent by the crown prince to China in 1389.; The minister Nai Po-lang-zhi-shi-ti and others were sent by the crown prince to China in January 1396.; Death of Xiānluó's king Can-lie Bao Pi-ya Si-li Duo-luo-lu. In 8 February 1396, Zhao Da and Zhu Fu were sent by China to offer sacrifices for the deceased king and authenticate Zhao Lu-qun Ying as the successor.; Zhao Lu-qun Ying as the Su-men-bang Prince sent envoy to China in 1398.
Chao Ai Phraya	เจ้าอ้ายพระยา	Suphannaphum	1408–1424	Son of the previous, Chao Nakhon In, and older brother of the 7th Ayutthaya's king Borommarachathirat II.

== Gallery ==
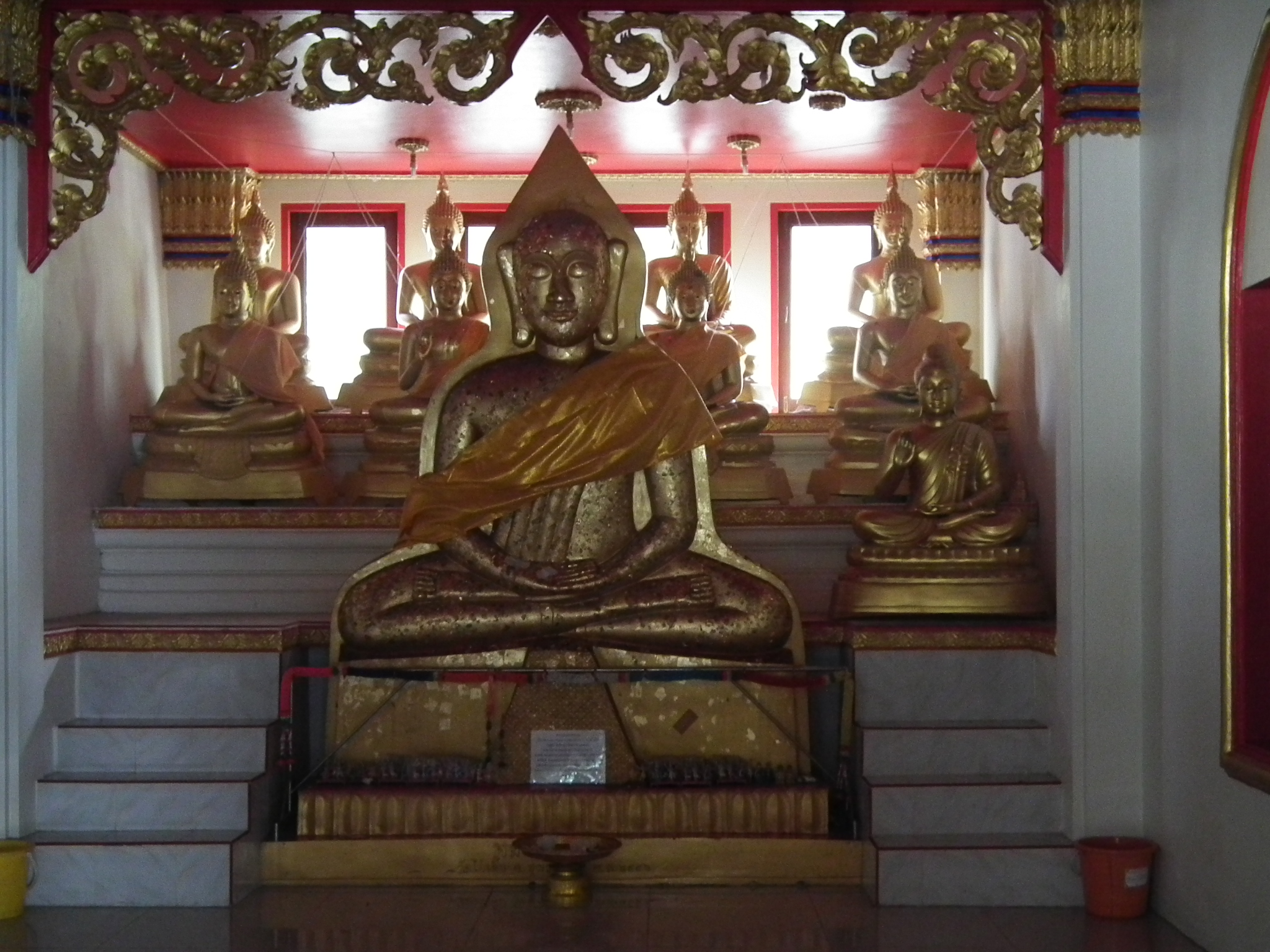
U-Thong style sculpture, found in Wat Kai Tia, Si Prachan district, Suphan Buri province

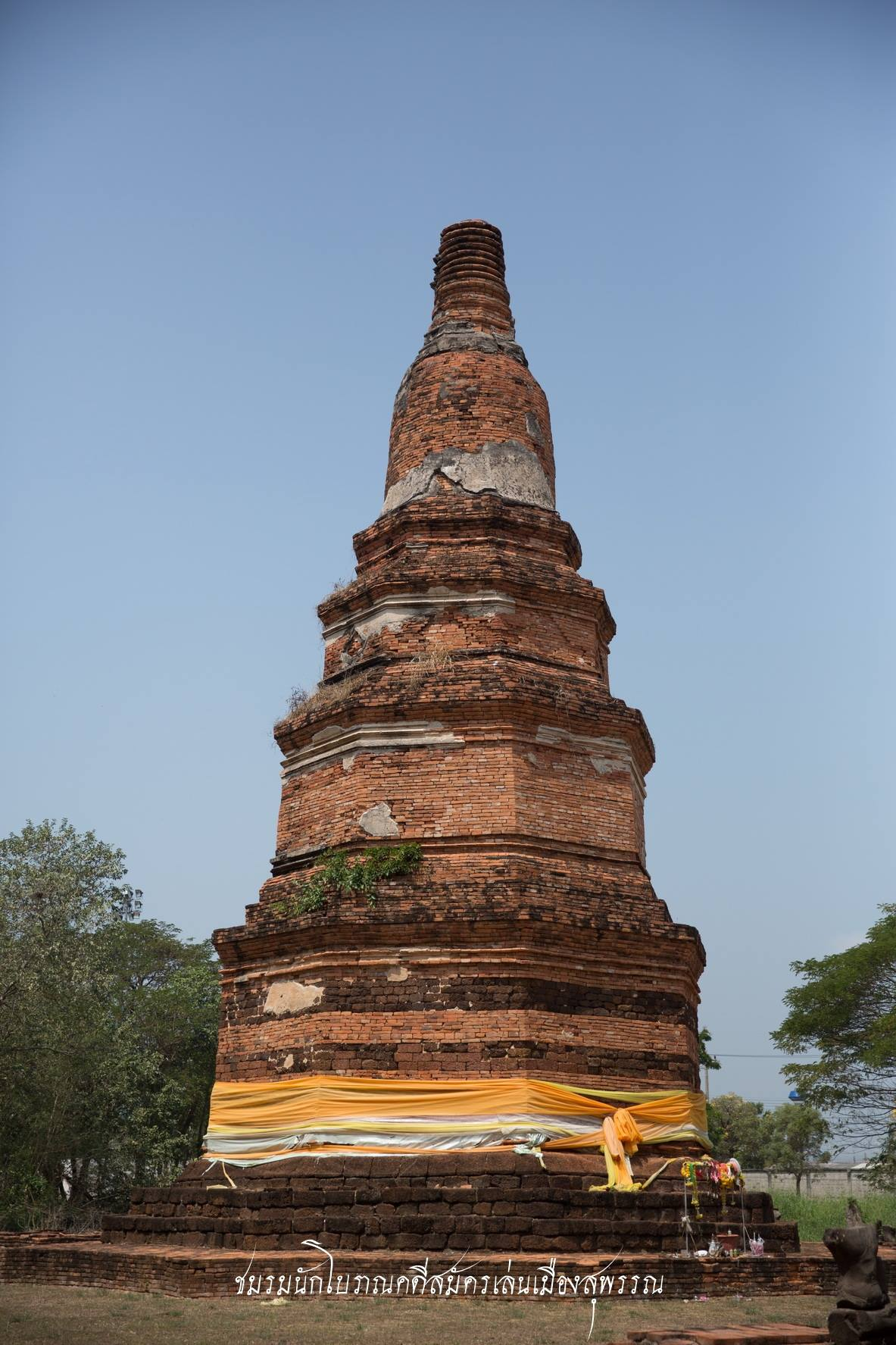
Main stupa at Wat Morakot, Mueang Suphan Buri, dates to the early 10th century.

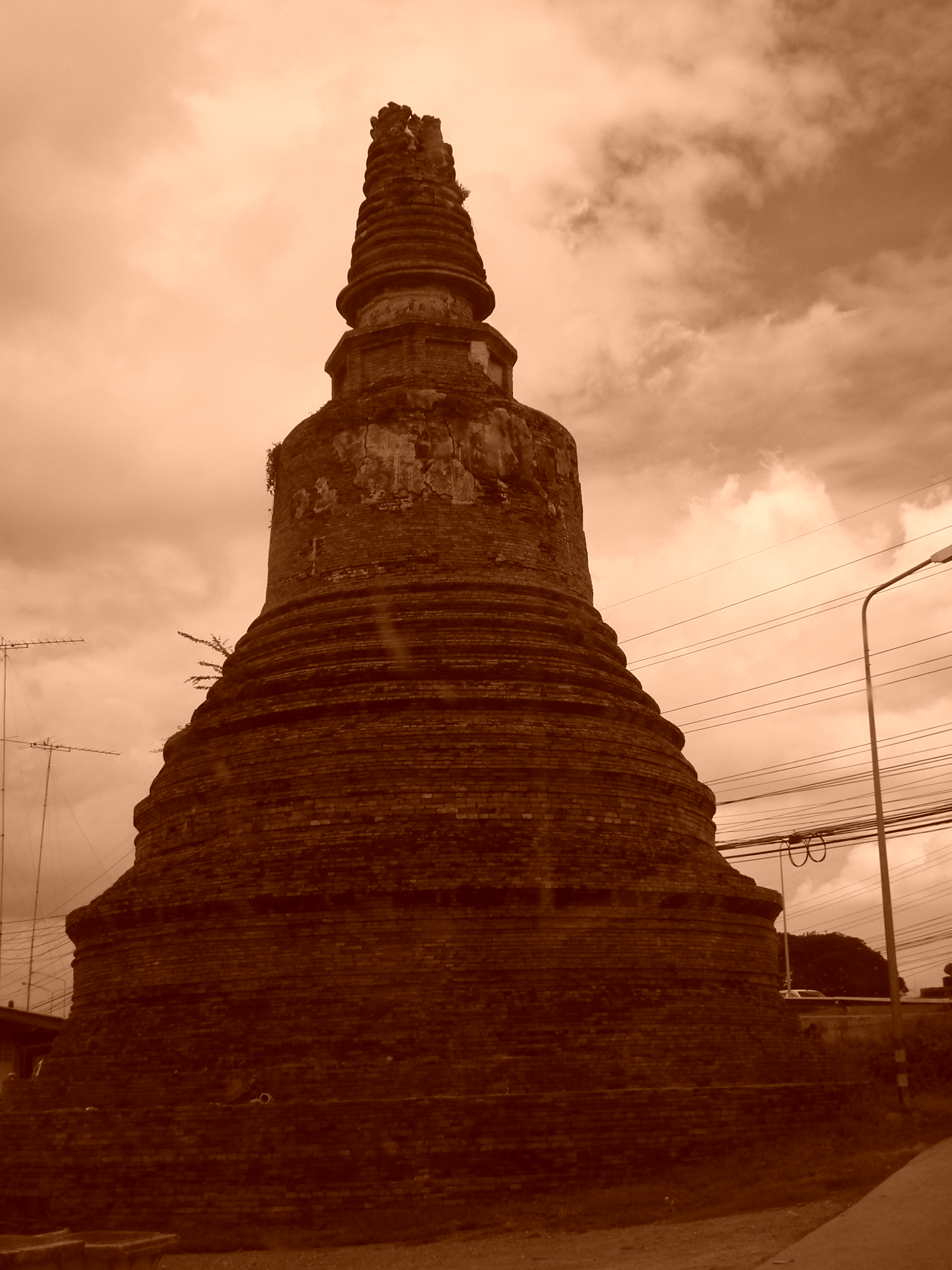
Chedi at the Wat Kuti Song ruin, Mueang Suphan Buri.

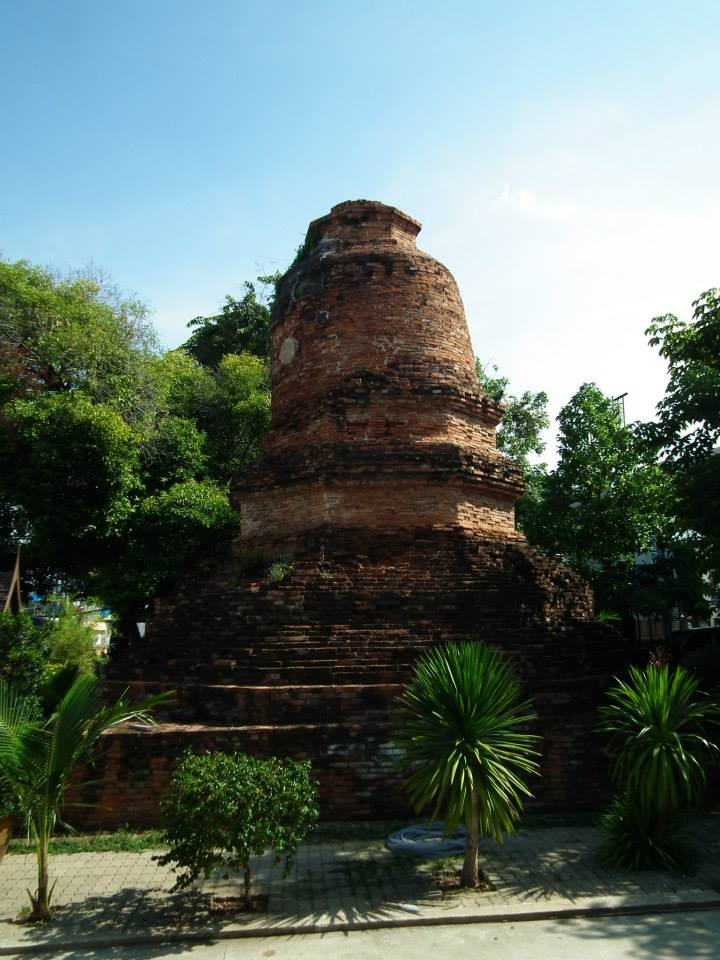
Chedi at the Wat Nong Neng ruin, Mueang Suphan Buri, dates to the early Ayuttha period.

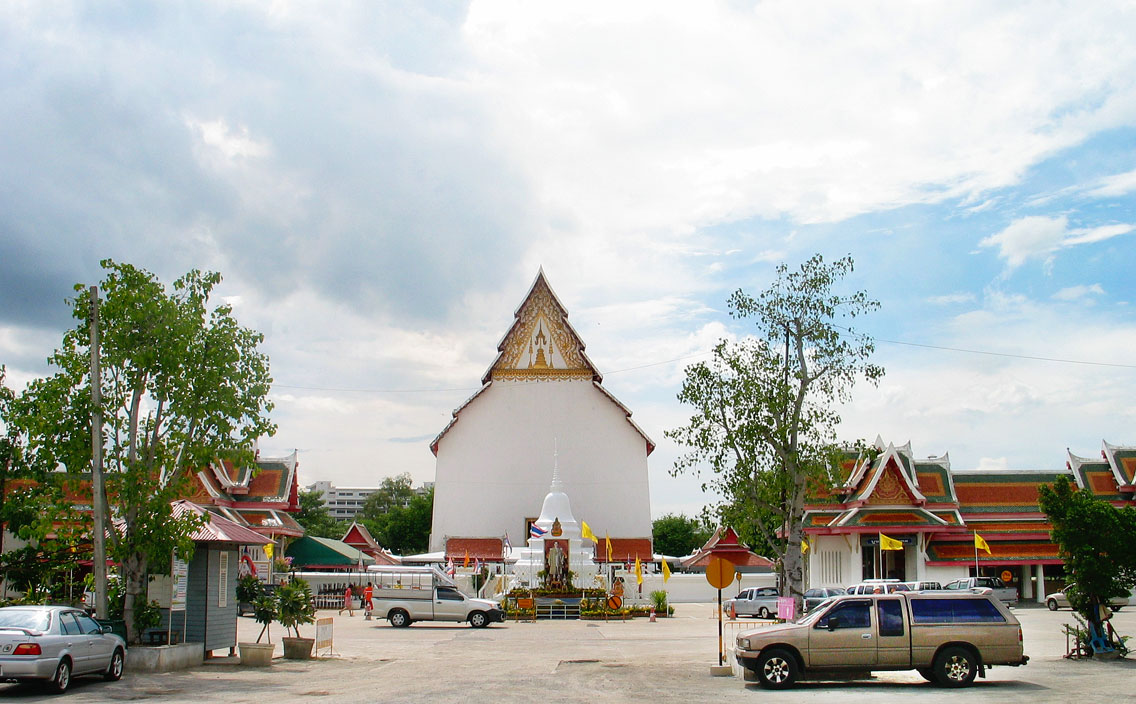
Wat Pa Lelai Worawihan, dates before 1181 (King Katae's reign).

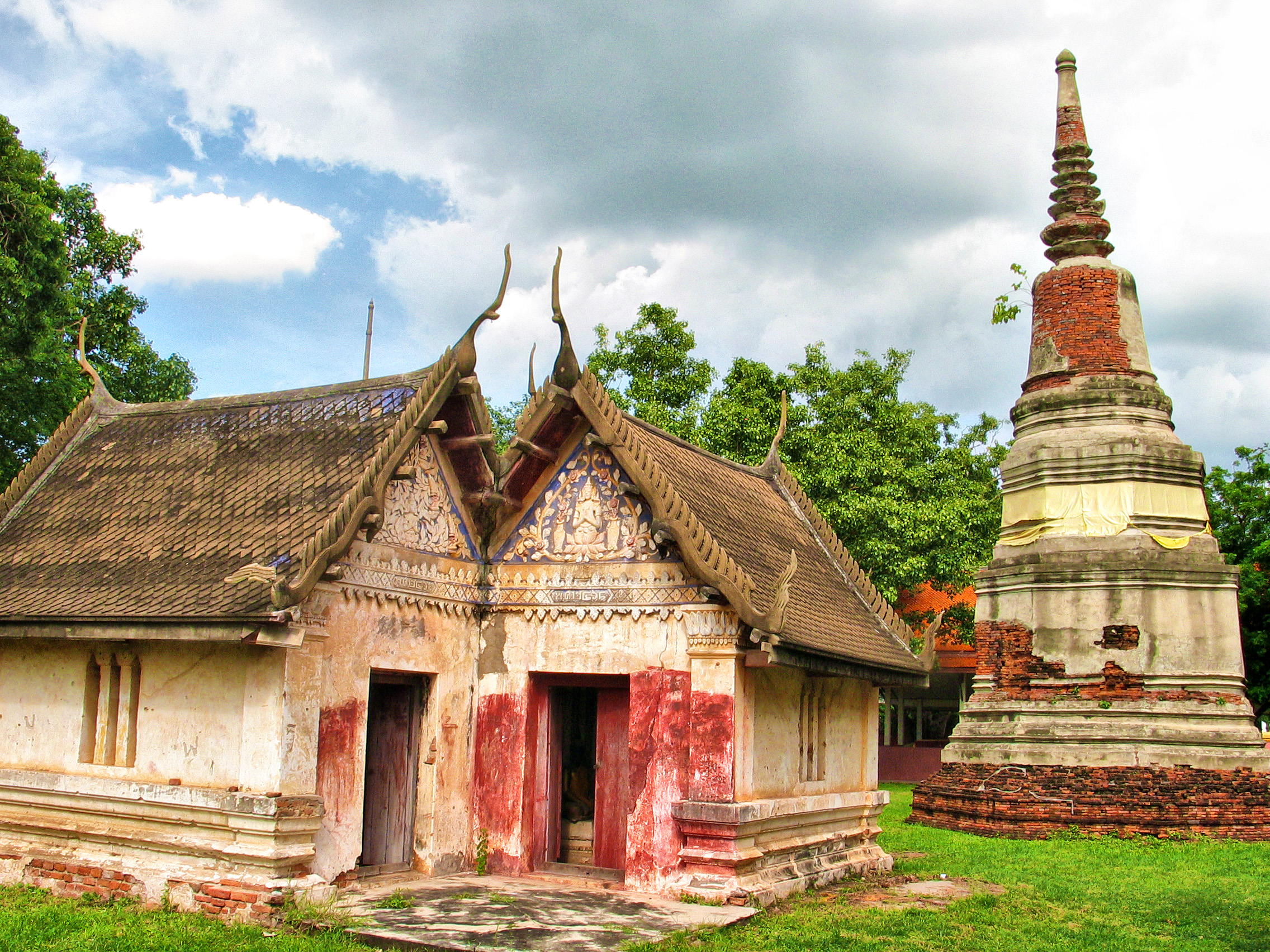
Ancient ruin in Wat Phra Sri Rattana Mahathat, dates before 1408.

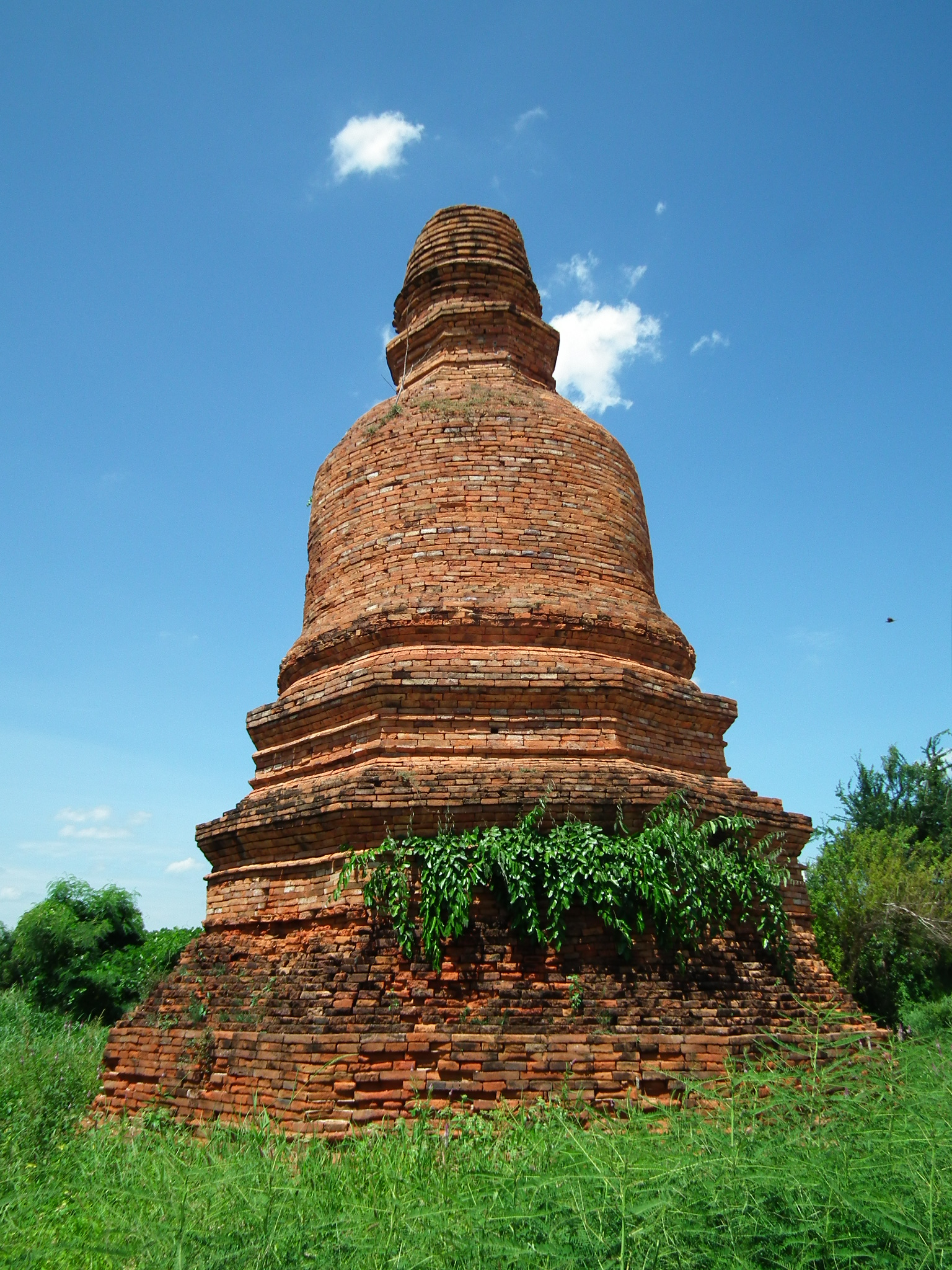
Lan Na style chedi in an ancient Wat Thale Thalai, Mueang district.

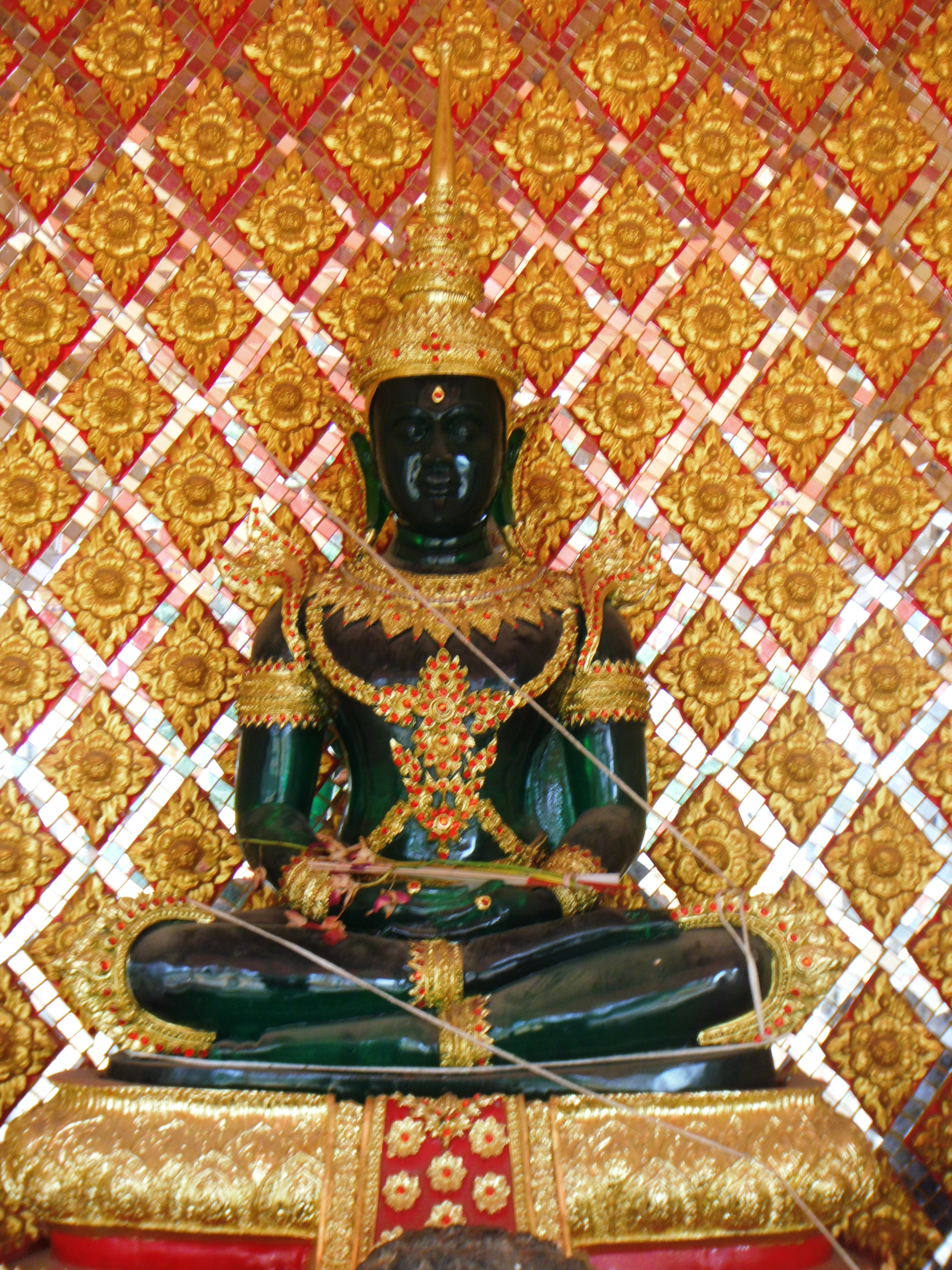
Dvaravati style sculpture, found in Wat Chi Suk Kasem, Mueang district.

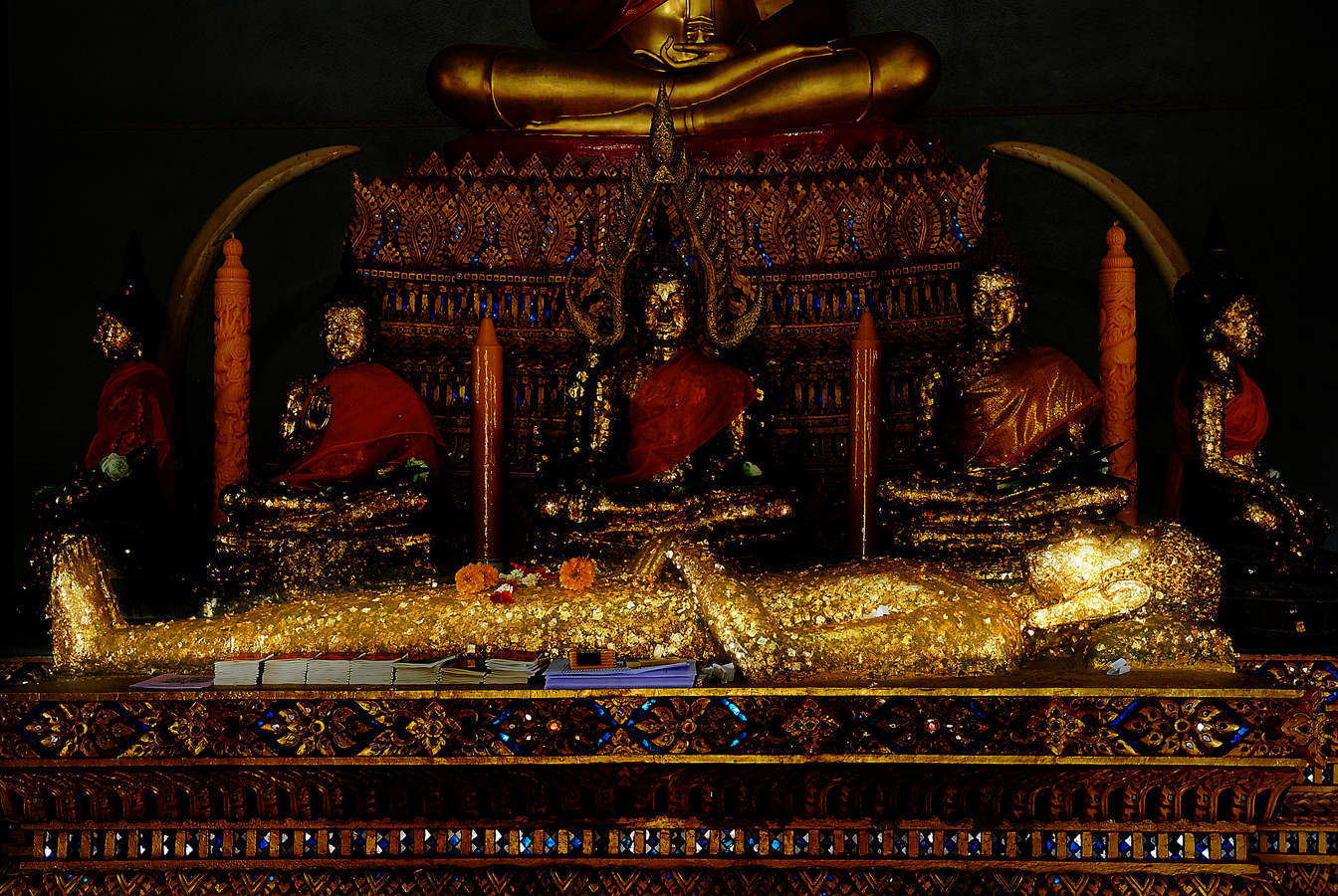
Thailand's oldest Reclining Buddha, found in Wat Phra Non, Mueang district.
