= Pansa =

King of Suphannabhum in the 10th century

Pansa พรรษา
- King of Suphannabhum

King of Dvaravati's Suphannabhum
- Reign: 916 – 930s
- Predecessor: Balaraj
- Successor: Chandra Devaraja

King of Dvaravati's Mueang Uthong
- Reign: 930s – 1006
- Predecessor: Vacant
- Successor: Ramapandita
- Born: 901; Nakhon Pathom
- Died: 1006; Mueang Uthong
- Father: Balaraj

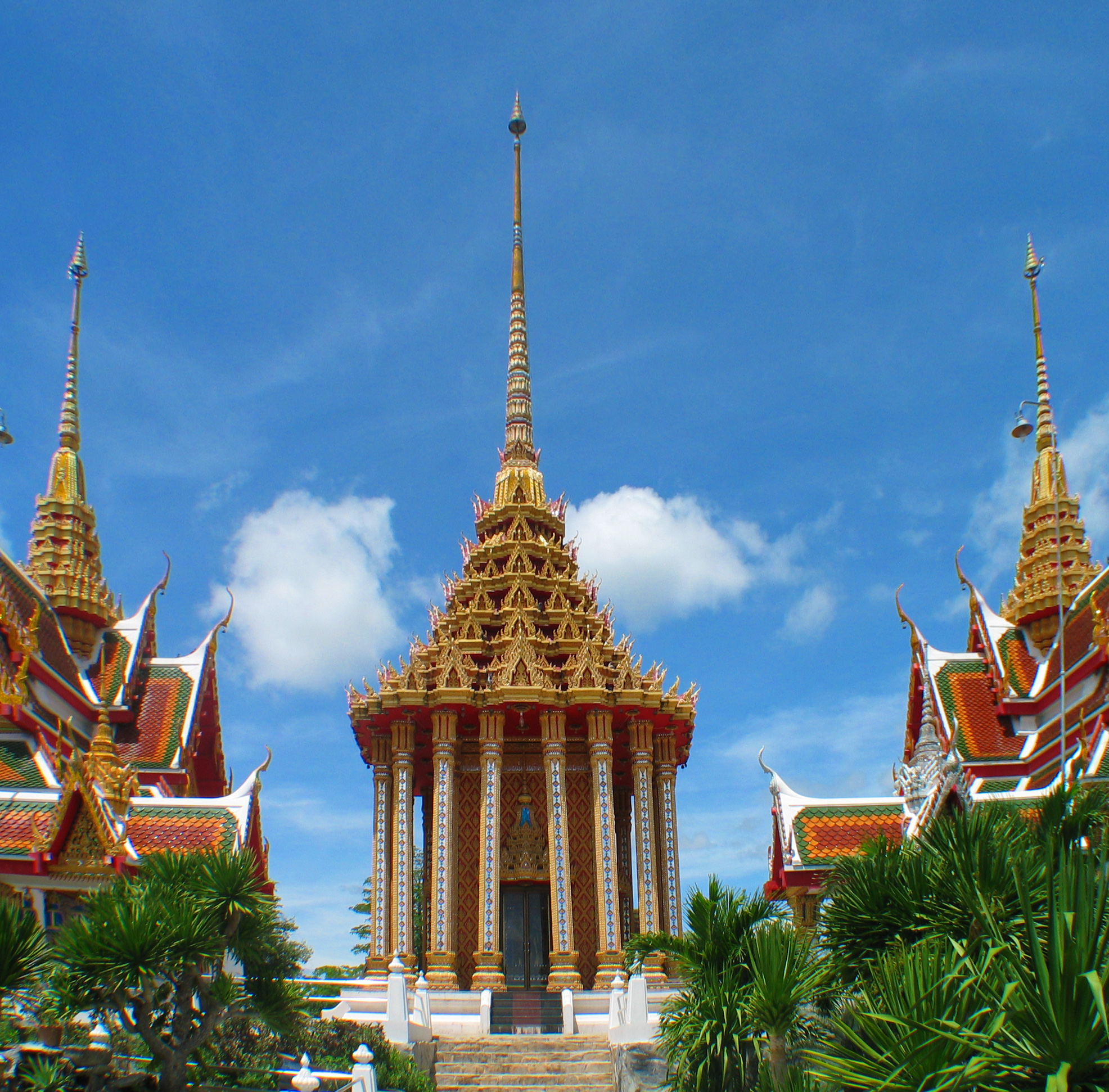
Wat Khao Phra Si Sanphetcharam, built during the reign of Pansa.

Pansa (Thai: พรรษา) is a Suphannabhum monarch attested in the Northern Chronicle. He is described there as a son of the legendary King Balaraj, who ruled Dvaravati's Nakhon Pathom from 867 to 913.

== Appointment at Phanthumburi ==
At the age of fifteen Pansa was appointed by his father as the first ruler of a newly established city on the left bank of the Tha Chin River, named Phanthumburi (พันธุมบุรี) and identified with the area of present-day Suphan Buri. The settlement later became the principal city of the Suphannabhum kingdom in the 10th century.

The year of his appointment is not given directly, and the chronological data of the Northern Chronicle is regarded by many Thai scholars as too distorted to reconstruct precisely. Borihan Thepthani supplies a date of death of 1006, from which he works back to an enthronement in 916 and a birth in 901. The chronicle credits him with a substantial role in the promotion of Buddhism, in particular through the construction of two temples, Wat Khao Phra Si Sanphetcharam and Wat Suan Luang (วัดสวนหลวง).

== Later reign and succession ==
Borihan Thepthani proposes that Pansa moved his seat to Mueang Uthong and renamed it Sri Ayodhya (ศรีอโยธยา). On that reading he ruled for about ninety years in all, first at Phanthumburi and afterwards at Mueang Uthong. He died in 1006 and was succeeded by Ramapandita, whose relationship to him is not recorded.

At the seat he had left, the Yonok Chronicle records that Pansa was probably succeeded by the Mon monarch Chandra Devaraja, again without stating how the two were related. That succession is taken to fall at least partly within 927 to 946, the years in which Tambralinga, under Sujita and his son Kampoch, campaigned across several polities of the Menam valley. The chronicle notes that Chandra Devaraja faced external threats, which have been associated with those incursions.
