= From Court to Capital =

1978 non-fiction book by Paul Wheatley and Thomas See

From Court to Capital: A Tentative Interpretation of the Origins of the Japanese Urban Tradition is a 1978 non-fiction book by Paul Wheatley and Thomas See, published by The University of Chicago Press.

The book describes Japan prior to urbanization, which means Japan before the first state government was formed. The book uses the same analysis used in The Pivot of Four Quarters, but it describes Japanese urban planning instead of Chinese urban planning.

Roy Andrew Miller stated that the book does not indicate which author had written which portions and/or had done which tasks, and he stated he felt confusion when the book talked in a first person voice.

== Contents ==
The initial portion of the book is about the question of where Japan's urbanization originated from and how urbanization occurs. The bulk of the book describes and analyzes archaeological information, Japanese literature, and Chinese articles.

== Reception ==
Miller criticized the book's scholarly interpretations and translations of ancient literature from China, arguing that existing translations "if consulted, would immediately show where they have gone wrong." Miller also stated that the authors should have "unsupported readings of such texts" with erroneous conclusions, as well as improper interpretations of Japanese texts, which "fare even worse", inconsistent romanization of Japanese, and improper usage of English terms. In sum Miller stated: "their control of over two-thirds of these sources is woefully inadequate". Miller overall argued that there were "the many different ways in which Wheatley & See's new book disappoints our reasonable expectations for a publication issued by the distinguished press of one of our major universities."

Charles Dunn, in Journal of the Royal Asiatic Society of Great Britain and Ireland, praised the book as being "a satisfactory contribution" due to content being "fully documented and analysed", despite the premise not being "original".

M. A. Morgan of the University of Bristol described the book as having an "impressive scholarly structure" in which "it is unlikely the integrity and overall shape of the structure will be seriously challenged for a generation."

Marwyn Samuels of the University of British Columbia praised the authors for having "courage (some might call it chutzpa [sic])" of covering a historical period with "wide gaps in our knowledge". The reviewer praised chapter 2, "The Rise of the Ceremonial Center," stating "this chapter alone justifies the volume[...]"
