= Song Phi Nong district =

Song Phi Nong สองพี่น้อง
- District
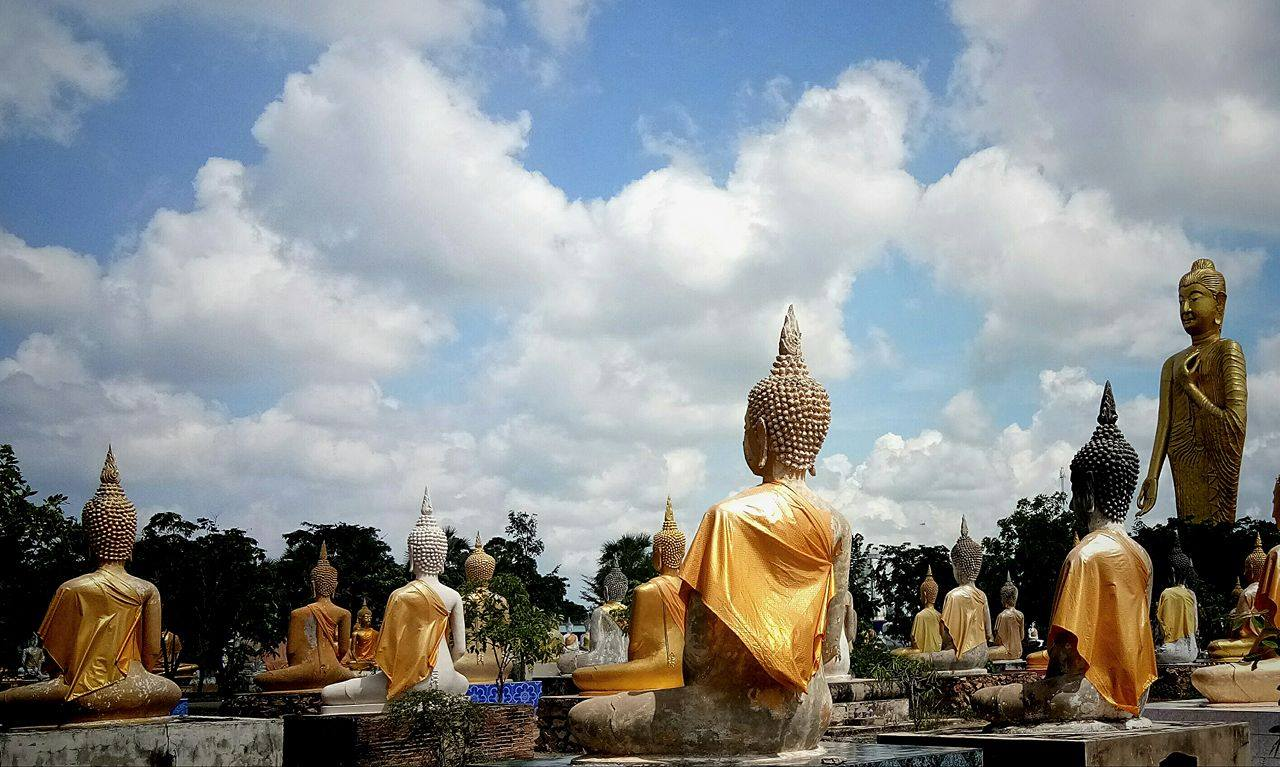
- Wat Phai Rong Wua notable local Buddhist temple

- Districtlocation in Suphan Buri province
- Coordinates: 14°13′25″N 100°1′16″E
- Country: Thailand
- Province: Suphan Buri

Area
  - Total: 750.381 km^{2} (289.724 sq mi)

Population (2013)
  - Total: 127,411
  - Density: 173.3/km^{2} (449/sq mi)
- Time zone: UTC+7 (ICT)
- Postal code: 72110
- Geocode: 7207

Song Phi Nong (Thai: สองพี่น้อง, pronounced [sɔ̌ːŋ pʰîː nɔ́ːŋ]) is the southernmost district (amphoe) of Suphan Buri province, central Thailand.

== History ==
The district was established in 1896. In the past the area of the district included U Thong district. The district office was moved away from the Song Phi Nong canal to the present location in 1964 because the old location was prone to flooding.

Its name, Song Phi Nong, means "two siblings." Presumably, it refers to the confluence of two watercourses, Tha Wa and Chorakhe Sam Phan, before they flow into the Tha Chin River. Another explanation comes from a folk tale about two brothers or two elephants who are siblings.

== Geography ==
Neighbouring districts are (from the north clockwise): U Thong and Bang Pla Ma of Suphan Buri Province; Lat Bua Luang of Ayutthaya province; Bang Len and Kamphaeng Saen of Nakhon Pathom province; and Tha Maka and Phanom Thuan of Kanchanaburi province.

The main water resource of the district is the Tha Chin River or Suphan River.

== Administration ==
=== Central administration ===
Song Phi Nong is divided into 15 subdistricts (tambons), which are further subdivided into 140 administrative villages (mubans).

No.	Name	Thai	Villages	Pop.
1.	Song Phi Nong	สองพี่น้อง	-	12,894
2.	Bang Len	บางเลน	7	7,099
3.	Bang Ta Then	บางตาเถร	18	15,443
4.	Bang Takhian	บางตะเคียน	8	5,634
5.	Ban Kum	บ้านกุ่ม	6	3,488
6.	Hua Pho	หัวโพธิ์	14	9,994
7.	Bang Phlap	บางพลับ	7	5,116
8.	Noen Phra Prang	เนินพระปรางค์	5	4,428
9.	Ban Chang	บ้านช้าง	5	3,159
10.	Ton Tan	ต้นตาล	6	3,350
11.	Si Samran	ศรีสำราญ	14	11,199
12.	Thung Khok	ทุ่งคอก	16	16,103
13.	Nong Bo	หนองบ่อ	9	5,333
14.	Bo Suphan	บ่อสุพรรณ	18	19,031
15.	Don Manao	ดอนมะนาว	7	5,140

=== Local administration ===
There is one town (thesaban mueang) in the district:

- Song Phi Nong (Thai: เทศบาลเมืองสองพี่น้อง) consisting of subdistrict Song Phi Nong.

There is one subdistrict municipality (thesaban tambon) in the district:

- Thung Khok (Thai: เทศบาลตำบลทุ่งคอก) consisting of parts of subdistrict Thung Khok.

There are 14 subdistrict administrative organizations (SAO) in the district:

- Bang Len (Thai: องค์การบริหารส่วนตำบลบางเลน) consisting of subdistrict Bang Len.
- Bang Ta Then (Thai: องค์การบริหารส่วนตำบลบางตาเถร) consisting of subdistrict Bang Ta Then.
- Bang Takhian (Thai: องค์การบริหารส่วนตำบลบางตะเคียน) consisting of subdistrict Bang Takhian.
- Ban Kum (Thai: องค์การบริหารส่วนตำบลบ้านกุ่ม) consisting of subdistrict Ban Kum.
- Hua Pho (Thai: องค์การบริหารส่วนตำบลหัวโพธิ์) consisting of subdistrict Hua Pho.
- Bang Phlap (Thai: องค์การบริหารส่วนตำบลบางพลับ) consisting of subdistrict Bang Phlap.
- Noen Phra Prang (Thai: องค์การบริหารส่วนตำบลเนินพระปรางค์) consisting of subdistrict Noen Phra Prang.
- Ban Chang (Thai: องค์การบริหารส่วนตำบลบ้านช้าง) consisting of subdistrict Ban Chang.
- Ton Tan (Thai: องค์การบริหารส่วนตำบลต้นตาล) consisting of subdistrict Ton Tan.
- Si Samran (Thai: องค์การบริหารส่วนตำบลศรีสำราญ) consisting of subdistrict Si Samran.
- Thung Khok (Thai: องค์การบริหารส่วนตำบลทุ่งคอก) consisting of parts of subdistrict Thung Khok.
- Nong Bo (Thai: องค์การบริหารส่วนตำบลหนองบ่อ) consisting of subdistrict Nong Bo.
- Bo Suphan (Thai: องค์การบริหารส่วนตำบลบ่อสุพรรณ) consisting of subdistrict Bo Suphan.
- Don Manao (Thai: องค์การบริหารส่วนตำบลดอนมะนาว) consisting of subdistrict Don Manao.
