= Mueang Uthong =

Archaeological site in Suphan Buri province, Thailand

Coordinates: 14°22′16″N 99°53′19″E

- เมืองอู่ทอง (Thai)
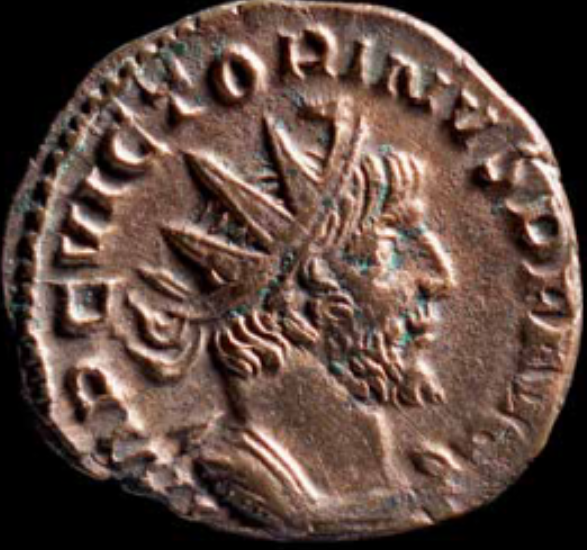
- Bronze double denarius of the Gallic Roman emperor Victorinus (r. 269–271 AD), reportedly found at the ancient city of U Thong, Suphan Buri Province, Thailand; now in the U Thong National Museum.
- Interactive map of Mueang Uthong
- Type: Human settlement
- Periods: Ancient history
- Cultures: Dvaravati
- Associated with: Mon people
- Location: Amphoe U Thong, Suphan Buri, Thailand

History
- Built: c. 300–600 AD
- Abandoned: 1st: c. 1000 AD; 2nd: 1767 AD

Site notes
- Area: 1.02 square kilometres (102 ha)
- Architectural styles: Dvaravati; Ayutthaya
- Excavation dates: 1930; 1960s; 1966–1970; 2010; 2015
- Archaeologists: Damrong Rajanubhab; George Cœdès; Jean Boisselier; William Watson; Helmut Loofs; San Thaiyanonda
- Discovered: 1903
- Condition: Partial restoration
- Owner: Public
- Management: Fine Arts Department, no entry fee
- Public access: Yes

Mueang Uthong (Thai: เมืองอู่ทอง) is an archaeological site located in the U Thong district, Suphan Buri province. It was inhabited from about the 10th century BC and developed into a complex state society between the 3rd and 6th centuries CE. Uthong was among the largest of the city-states that emerged on the plains of central Thailand in the first millennium, and was abandoned about 1000 AD after epidemic and the loss of its standing as a trading centre. It was resettled in the Ayutthaya period but was abandoned again after the fall of Ayutthaya in the 1760s.

Excavation has recovered inscribed silver medallions bearing the name Dvaravati, Brahmanical images including a rare ekamukhaliṅga, wheels of the law, and stucco figures read as foreign merchants. Imported Tang ceramics, Persian Gulf glazed ware, Abbasid coins and glass beads from India, the Middle East and China have also been found. The town has been placed at the inland end of routes running from the coast to the tin and lead of the western hills.

The site has been identified with several polities named in Chinese and Greek sources, and with the Suvarnabhumi of Buddhist tradition, though none of these identifications is settled.

== History ==
=== Prehistory ===
The results of archaeological studies revealed that the area around U Thong has been inhabited since about the 10th century BC, between the Neolithic and Metal Ages. The evidence found was tools made of stone and metal, such as bronze spear blades, bronze axes, and earring molds made of stone. A double animal-headed ear pendant from U Thong, about 40 mm long, was published by Ian Glover in 1996. Hsiao-chun Hung and Peter Bellwood include it in the distribution of that ornament type, which is otherwise concentrated in Iron Age sites of central and southern Vietnam, the Philippines and peninsular Thailand. They trace the green nephrite used for the type to the Fengtian source in eastern Taiwan, and the finishing of such ornaments to workshops in Southeast Asia rather than in Taiwan itself.

=== Before the 7th century ===
==== Excavation and finds ====
Higham reports that radiocarbon determinations from the U Thong sites suggest that the transition into complex state societies in the area took place between about 300–600 AD. A copper inscription from the mid-7th century states, "Sri Harshavarman, grandson of Ishanavarman, having expanded his sphere of glory, obtained the lion throne through regular succession," and mentions gifts to a linga. The site includes a moat, 1,690 by 840 m, and the Pra Paton caitya. That copper plate, K. 964, was recovered from the ancient moat and is now in the U Thong National Museum.

Three of the inscribed silver medallions that carry the name Dvāravatī were excavated here under controlled conditions in 1997, at monument 7 of Khok Chang Din, inside a jar holding uninscribed ritual coins and chopped silver ingots. That site has yielded only Hindu remains, among them a rare stone ekamukhaliṅga now in the U Thong National Museum, and other Śiva-liṅgas, including a second and unusual ekamukhaliṅga, are recorded from the same area. Nicolas Revire takes the combination to suggest that the lord of Dvāravatī counted the erection of a Śiva-liṅga among his meritorious works. A terracotta chandraśālā antefix carrying a bust of Śiva, of the second half of the fifth century, is recorded from Wat Satavas at Ban No Lao in U Thong. At monument 5 of the Khok Chang Din group, on the south-eastern foot of Khao Khok, a temple base was found with traces of a sacred pond, a śiva-liṅga and an ekamukhaliṅga on a yoni base. Phatharaphong Kao-ngoen dates the last on Gupta parallels to the 7th or 8th century. A high-relief slab of four-armed Viṣṇu, of the 8th or 9th century, was found at Tha Phraya Chak, the town's old landing.

Boisselier dug at the site for the Fine Arts Department in the 1960s, chiefly at its stupas. William Watson and Helmut Loofs excavated systematically between 1966 and 1970 and obtained five radiocarbon dates, and Andrew Barram and Ian Glover later processed five more. Comparing the pottery with that of Chan Sen, they found wave and line decoration, spouted vessels, carinated wares and clay lamps of Dvaravati type in layers datable to the 1st to 4th centuries. H. G. Quaritch Wales's synthesis of 1969, as his reviewer Stanley O'Connor summarised it the next year, read the small tin ornaments from the site, which resemble finds from Óc Eo in design and manufacture, as "Funanese". That look suggested a range of roughly the 1st to 6th centuries, with Amarāvatī-style terracotta and stucco reflecting contact with India and Ceylon in the 3rd or 4th century.

San Thaiyanonda's three test pits of 2010 added to the sequence. Pottery with wavy line decoration from the rampart is dated to the 4th or 5th century, by comparison with material from the Pontian River in Pahang and from Go-Hang and Canh Den in Vietnam. A potsherd carrying a Pallava inscription appears to be of the mid-6th century. The other two pits gave the more conventional 7th to 9th centuries, and a late Dvaravati phase of the 9th to 11th. Thaiyanonda concludes that both the moat and the connection with Indic culture date to the mid-4th century at the latest. Matthew Gallon takes moat building as a public work carried out by a more centralised authority, and so as an indicator of early state formation, which Stephen A. Murphy reads as proto-state activity at U Thong in the 4th century.

The Faculty of Archaeology at Silpakorn University excavated at Noen Phlapphla in 2015. A layer associated with funerary practice was reached, and a child's skeleton was recovered with a chain of beads tied at the knees.

A fragmentary terracotta relief of three monks with alms bowls, now in the U Thong National Museum, is attributed on style to the Nagarjunakonda school and so to the 3rd or 4th century. Boisselier and Phasook Indrawooth took that as the date of the stupa it came from, which would place Buddhism at U Thong two or three centuries before the conventional start of the Dvaravati period. Others, Nicolas Revire among them, argue for the 7th or 8th century, and Gallon holds that the monument itself needs absolute dating before any conclusion is drawn. The plaque is recorded from stupa 2, and a locally made stucco Buddha sheltered by a nāga, in the same Amarāvatī manner, from within the town.

==== Setting and trade ====
The city of Uthong was located on the bank of the Nam Chorakhe Suphan River (currently called Khlong Chorakhe Sam Phan). The boundary of the Palaeo-gulf lay further north than the present-day shoreline, so trading ships could reach the city by the Nam Chorakhe Suphan River. That made Uthong an important port of the region, along with the Funan's port city of Óc Eo in present-day southern Vietnam. Baker and Pasuk report that recent research has the sea receding earlier than once thought, with the coastline settling near its present position by 500 CE. That revises the long-held view that the lower gulf was under water in the first millennium and that many Dvaravati sites then stood on the coast. Murphy reports Trongjai Hutangkura's reconsideration of the old shoreline as finding that the survey it rests on overestimated the height of the mean sea level, and that what was mapped as coast was a floodplain.

The ancient city of Uthong also had trade contacts with the West, from the Indians to the Greeks and Romans in the Mediterranean Sea, that expanded the sea trade to countries in Southeast Asia and China. Evidence found in the area, including glazed Chinese ceramics from the Tang dynasty, beads and jewelry from India, Persian wares, and many other decorations from Greece, Rome, China, and the Middle East, proves the area was contacted by external territories. The trade also brought Brahmanism and Buddhism from India to U-Thong, making it the first settlement to practice such religions in the region.

=== Dvaravati period: 7th–11th century ===
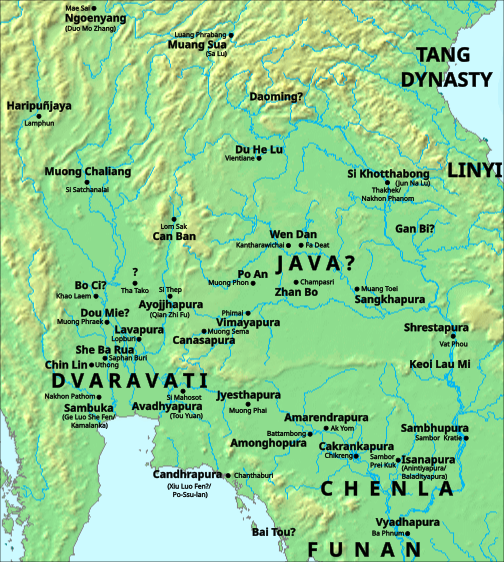
Early 7th century political entities in the Menam and Mekhong Valleys.

==== Trade and routes ====
The hills behind the town carry a group of sanctuaries and inscriptions. The Pushyagiri inscription was found at the foot of Khao Tham Thiam, and the votive tablets from the shrine of Phu Hang Nak on Khao Rang Kabit are Mahayana in type and Pallava-influenced. Walailak Songsiri reads the Mahayana material as Pala influence reaching U Thong from Odisha and Kalinga. She describes the town as the inland end of routes running from the coast and the Tenasserim range by the Mae Klong and the Phachi. They led to the tin of Suan Phueng, Thung Kha and Chom Bueng in Ratchaburi, and to the lead worked between the Khwae Noi and the Khwae Yai. Lawa highlanders collected aromatic wood, horn, hide, beeswax and stream minerals for the middlemen.

Phasook Indrawooth traces the same material to Srivijaya instead, and dates its arrival to the 9th to 11th centuries. She records a bronze Padmapāṇi 23.5 cm high, dug from an irrigation ditch in U Thong subdistrict, of about the 9th or 10th century. An Avalokiteśvara head from stupa 13 and a votive tablet in Śrīvijaya style from stupa 15 are recorded with it. Manop Nakkarnrian and his co-authors note that the bronzes are small and may have been carried north by travellers from the peninsula. The Śrīvijayan reading has a longer history. Reviewing Quaritch Wales in 1970, O'Connor reported Boisselier's argument in Nouvelles connaissances archéologiques de la ville d'U T'ong (1968) that the decorative arts of Dvāravatī underwent "a virtual renaissance" in the 9th century under Śrīvijayan influence. He found Quaritch Wales unduly reserved toward it.

Goods from further afield reached the town along the same routes. Sherds of Tang ceramics and of Persian Gulf turquoise-glazed ware are reported from the site, one turquoise-glazed sherd having been set into stucco ornament; it is in the U Thong National Museum. Two Abbasid copper coins are recorded, one of them displayed in the museum. One bears a date equivalent to 767, in the caliphate of al-Mansur, though its provenance is not established. The other, of al-Mahdi, who reigned from 775 to 785, was excavated by the Fine Arts Department at monument 12 of the Khok Chang Din group. Stucco and terracotta figures recovered in clearing the monuments have been identified as foreign merchants, unlike the more numerous local figures in feature and dress and wearing tall hats and sometimes boots.

Glass beads from Noen Phlapphla in U Thong subdistrict include one of the lead composition that Robert Brill and Gan Fuxi treat as diagnostic of Chinese production. A single gold-imitation bead from the town belongs to a type made at Siraf in Iran, at Berenike in Egypt and at Thung Tuek in Phang-nga. Striped beads had been found at U Thong earlier and are displayed in the U Thong National Museum. Chin Youdi took them in 1966 for Roman products, evidence of Mediterranean contact with Asia in the third and fourth centuries, and allowed that Asian copies may have followed. Peter Francis held in 1996 that beads of this kind were made in the Middle East. Krit Won-in and colleagues analysed thirty beads from the site, in twelve colours, by scanning electron microscopy with energy-dispersive X-ray spectrometry, by infrared spectrometry and by atomic force microscopy. They report the oxides present in each colour, and surface pitting read as corrosion. The study was intended to build a reference set from which beads from different sites could later be compared.

==== Extent and religious remains ====
During the 6th–7th centuries, Uthong was considered one of the centres of Dvaravati culture. Antiques were found scattered in the ancient ruins as well as along the banks of Khlong Chorakhe Sam Phan from Phanom Thuan District of Kanchanaburi Province to Don Chedi District and U Thong District of Suphan Buri Province. No fewer than twenty mounds are recorded inside the walls and outside them, each the site of an ancient stupa. Stupa 1 survives only as a base of brick laid in mortar. Its large redented base carrying the cella is of a Dvaravati form also found at Chula Prathon and Wat Phra Prathon Chedi in Nakhon Pathom, and is dated to the 6th to 11th centuries. Brick collected in the town is of one size with the brick of Mueang Fa Daet Song Yang, about 28 by 14 by 8 cm, and both were tempered with rice chaff or rice husk ash. The U Thong brick was made from the deposits of a fast river and is the stronger of the two, and both match experimental brick fired at 1,000–1,200 °C. The sampled brick has no excavated context.

Wheels of the law from U Thong are among the comparanda Eng Jin Ooi and Peter Skilling use for a wheel found in Chai Nat in 1988. As on the Chai Nat wheel, their felloes are framed by inner and outer bands of pearls, but the felloe between the bands is flat and filled with pattern rather than plain and inscribed. A lion in the U Thong National Museum shows the raised forearm they compare with the pair of lions found with the Chai Nat wheel. At least three stone wheels are recorded from the town. One was found within it, one in the clearing of stupa 2 and one in that of stupa 11, where the wheel, its pillar and its pedestal stood together in their original position.

Terracotta figurines of a man leading a monkey have been found in quantity at the town, made from two-piece moulds and dated to the 7th to 9th centuries. Every example recovered has lost its head. The figure stands upright, wearing ornaments at the neck and waist and stacked bracelets, with the monkey at his leg, a rope in the right hand and a branch held against the thigh. Khian Yimsiri related them to Hanumān, as amulets against danger or as an honouring of the monkey as a help to human livelihood. Elizabeth Lyons rejected the connection and read the monkey as the restless mind and the man's restraint of it as mental discipline, in Theravada terms. Manop Nakkarnrian and his co-authors propose instead that the figures carried misfortune away from the sick and from women near childbirth.

One of the Phu Hang Nak tablets carries an inscription in Mon in post-Pallava script naming a king Marata as its donor, of the 9th or 10th century.

==== Decline ====
Previous scholars suggested that the old capital of Dvaravati was sacked by Chenla in the 8th or 9th century. A royal lineage fled and founded a new city of Suvarnabhumi in the present-day Ladya subdistrict, Kanchanaburi, and the same line is said to have resettled U Thong early in the 9th century.

A different account of the 8th century has been proposed on art-historical grounds. Hiram Woodward places Si Thep within the polity known from Tang Chinese records as Wen Dan. He suggests that a Si Thep powerful enough to dominate that century may have exercised some control not only over Lopburi but over centres further west, including Nakhon Pathom, U Thong and Khu Bua. He asks whether central Dvaravati should accordingly be understood as having pre- and post-Wen Dan phases. As an alternative he offers that Dvaravati features at Si Thep resulted from a peaceful movement of monks preceding Wen Dan's rise rather than from conquest. He presents the whole as a possibility rather than a finding. Woodward also cites the stuccos of U Thong or Nakhon Pathom as the source of the facial modelling of a stone Buddha in the Cleveland Museum of Art which he attributes to an 8th-century Si Thep workshop.

Karen Mudar's locational analysis of 63 moated settlements on the central plain gives U Thong a different standing. Measuring the moat-enclosed area from aerial photographs at 73.3 ha, she ranked it a district centre, the third of four administrative levels, below Nakhon Pathom at 602 ha and the regional centres at Suphanburi and Phraek Si Racha. The figure does not agree with the moat dimensions of 1,690 by 840 m that Higham reports. On that reading U Thong was no more than a minor centre by the 10th century. Mudar suggested that the copper plate found there may record the loss of an earlier autonomy and the town's absorption into a wider regional system, rather than the presence of a court. That reading runs against the sequence of capitals from U Thong to Nakhon Pathom which she attributes to Higham.

The Nam Chorakhe Suphan River silted, grew shallow in places and ceased to be navigable, and epidemics followed. Uthong lost its standing as a port and was abandoned about the 11th century, before Khmer influence reached its height in the 12th century under Jayavarman VII. Songsiri reads the evidence otherwise, holding that U Thong and the country around it were occupied continuously from the Iron Age through the Funan and Dvaravati periods and into the 13th century. She cites the Phra Tham Suea votive tablets of the 11th to 13th centuries from the caves of the same hills.

The city was then moved eastward. The epidemic did not abate, and it was relocated again to the east bank of the Tha Chin River, on the site of present-day Suphan Buri.

=== Ayutthaya Kingdom: 14th–18th century ===
The area was re-settled during the Ayutthaya period since some chedis discovered by Damrong Rajanubhab appear to be of more recent origin and would appear to date from the time of Ayutthaya. No historical chronicle directly mentions Uthong in this period; the area was controlled by Suphan Buri. However, after Ayutthaya was sacked by troops of the Burmese Konbaung dynasty in 1767, both Suphan Buri, then a frontier town, and the settlements around it were destroyed and left abandoned.

U Thong also became the origin of the Ayutthaya Kingdom, as the first King of Ayutthaya, Ramathibodi, was the prince of U Thong when the city was struck by an epidemic, prompting him to relocate east and found Ayutthaya.

=== Rattanakosin era: 1782–Present ===
In 1836, according to the Journey to Suphan, a poem written by a royal poet, Sunthorn Phu, Suphanburi as well as its surrounding area, which includes Uthong, was still wasteland; however, the area was resettled with limited numbers of villagers about four years later, around 1840. Later in 1895, during the reign of Chulalongkorn, due to the country's administration reform, the area was governed by a newly established district, Bueng Chorakhe Sam Phan (บึงจระเข้สามพัน), with its seat in the present-day Chorakhe Sam Phan sub-district. However, to conform with local history, the district government head office was relocated to the ancient city of Uthong, and the district was also renamed to such in 1939.

The ancient city of Uthong was officially excavated by Damrong Rajanubhab and George Cœdès in 1930.

== Identification ==
Uthong is also considered the first city-state that practiced Brahmanism and Buddhism in present-day central Thailand. O. W. Wolters speculated that Mueang Uthong was the centre of Chen Li Fu, an ancient kingdom mentioned in the Chinese text Sung Hui Yao Kao in 1200 and 1205. Archaeological findings indicate that the city was already deserted in those years. Jean Boisselier further suggested that Mueang Uthong may have served as a political center within the Funan sphere during certain periods.

According to the archaeological evidence found in the area, Boisselier suggests that Uthong was probably a centre, or a colony, of the Funan Kingdom from the 1st century AD. When Funan lost its power, Uthong became an important trading town of Dvaravati in the 7th to 11th centuries.

Paul Wheatley suggests that the city-state of Chin Lin might be located in the area of Uthong. The Chinese archives of the Liang dynasty name it as the last state occupied by Fan Man, the Great King of Funan, in the 4th century AD. Wheatley's ground is that Chin Lin means land of gold, or Suvarnabhumi. The archive places it about 2,000 li (800 kilometres) west of Funan, which he takes to correspond to the area of Uthong.

The city of "Balangka, an inland town" (บลังกา), mentioned in the Geographike Hyphegesis of Ptolemy in the 2nd century, has been assumed by Thai scholars to have been Mueang Uthong. The same has been proposed for Chia-mo-lang-chia, or Kamalanka, which the Chinese monk Xuanzang placed in the 7th century south-east of Sri Ksetra kingdom and west of Dvaravati, and which has likewise been placed at Mueang Uthong. Others place it at the ancient Nakhon Pathom instead.

Mueang Uthong is often regarded in local tradition as an early religious centre in central Thailand. Despite extensive archaeological investigation, no material securely attributable to the Mauryan period, or to the reign of Ashoka (3rd century BCE), has been identified there. The identification of the site with the mythical Suvarnabhumi, advanced by some Thai scholars and widely held in local tradition, therefore lacks archaeological corroboration. The neighbouring settlement of Pong Tuek, by contrast, is an important site for the early presence of Buddhism in the region.

== General references ==
- Thepthani, Phra Borihan (1953). Thai National Chronicles: the history of the nation since ancient times (in Thai). S. Thammasamakkhi. Archived from the original on 5 November 2023.
