= U Thong National Museum =

- พิพิธภัณฑสถานแห่งชาติ อู่ทอง
- Established: 1959
- Location: U Thong Subdistrict, U Thong District, Suphan Buri Province, Thailand
- Coordinates: 14.373075°N 99.89155°E
- Type: National museum
- Owner: Fine Arts Department
- Website: www.finearts.go.th/authongmuseum

U Thong National Museum (Thai: พิพิธภัณฑสถานแห่งชาติ อู่ทอง) is a national museum in U Thong District, Suphan Buri Province, Thailand, located to the south of the district office. Established in 1959 and administered by the Fine Arts Department, the museum was founded to house and present archaeological finds from the ancient city of U Thong and its surrounding area, with exhibitions covering periods from prehistory to the Dvaravati era.

== History ==
U Thong National Museum is located on Mali Man Road in U Thong Subdistrict, U Thong District, Suphan Buri Province, about 33 kilometres from Mueang Suphan Buri District. The museum stands within the U Thong Ancient City area, covering approximately 25 rai (about 4 hectares) and situated near the U Thong District Office.

The museum is closely associated with U Thong Ancient City, an oval-shaped settlement with substantial remains of monuments, artefacts, and stupas dating mainly to the Dvaravati period.

The museum's collections were developed to present archaeological material excavated in and around U Thong, reflecting human occupation in the Suphan Buri area from the Neolithic through the Bronze Age, as well as Dvaravati-period Buddhist art, including Buddha images. In addition to archaeology, the museum also incorporates ethnographic displays relating to the Tai Dam community, including a reconstructed Tai Dam house furnished with everyday household implements, highlighting aspects of tradition, belief, subsistence, and dress that have persisted alongside broader local cultural integration.

In 1903, Prince Damrong Rajanubhab visited U Thong Ancient City and identified it as comparable in period to Nakhon Pathom. King Vajiravudh (Rama VI) later visited the site in 1913, after which responsibility for the area was transferred to what became the Fine Arts Department. U Thong Ancient City was officially registered as a national ancient monument on 8 March 1935.

A temporary museum building was constructed in 1957. Further archaeological survey and excavation work in 1961 revealed numerous Dvaravati-period stupas and artefacts, prompting the establishment of a permanent museum building in 1965 to house and display finds from the site. The museum was formally opened on 13 May 1966 by King Bhumibol Adulyadej (Rama IX) and Queen Sirikit. The museum complex later developed into two connected two-storey buildings, with landscaped areas used for an outdoor display space, and an additional Tai Dam house as part of the ethnographic section.

According to a 2024 report, the Fine Arts Department launched a five-phase, multi-year project (fiscal years 2021–2025) to develop and enhance the U Thong National Museum. The project includes repairs and upgrades to the exhibition building and the modernization of permanent exhibitions using contemporary display and interpretation techniques. It also aims to update exhibition content to current, internationally aligned standards, with a renewed focus on presenting the ancient city of U Thong and Dvaravati culture, positioning the museum as an important national learning resource and cultural tourism destination.

== Collections ==
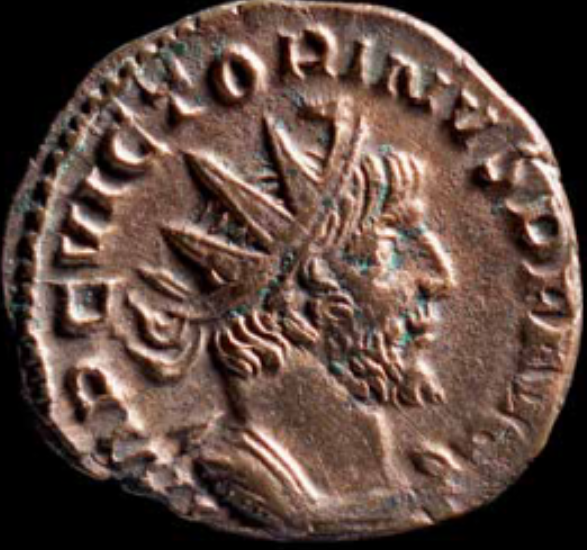
A Roman coin of Emperor Victorinus, c. AD 270. Although it was not recovered through archaeological excavation, it was donated to the U Thong National Museum; the donor stated that it had been found at the ancient city of U Thong.

The museum's collections comprise archaeological finds from the ancient city of U Thong and related sites, ranging from prehistory to the Dvaravati period.

A major highlight is a complete Dharmachakra assemblage (wheel, base and pillar) excavated from Stupa and dated to the 12th–13th Buddhist centuries (c. 1,300–1,400 years ago). The Fine Arts Department describes this set as the most complete example of a dharmachakra mounted on a pillar found in Thailand, and uses it to support the interpretation that dharmachakras were installed on pillars in front of religious buildings in the Dvaravati period.

The collections include evidence of long-distance exchange along trade routes in Suvarnabhumi, including a Roman coin of Emperor Victorinus, Arabic coins, imported ceramics from the Middle East and China, and stucco depicting a foreign merchant's face.

Material from archaeological work (1903–present) includes finds from both Buddhist stupas and viharas as well as Brahmanical–Hindu religious sites; notable items include a Dvaravati-period Buddha image in the teaching posture from Stupa.

Architectural and decorative elements from Dvaravati religious buildings are also represented, such as ceremonial foundation bricks used in auspicious rituals and stucco and terracotta ornamentation from sacred structures.

Personal adornment objects include large quantities of beads—among them imported carnelian and agate from India—along with Dvaravati-era gold jewellery and terracotta figures of dancers that depict the wearing of ornaments.

Objects related to religion and belief include terracotta monk figures and other inscribed items bearing the Buddhist verse "Ye Dhamma", votive tablets with inscribed disciples, a gold Buddha head, a mukhalinga, and terracotta figurines depicting people and animals.
