= Kar Tayy =

Legendary ruler of Suphan Buri

Kar Tayy (Thai: กาแต, also spelt Kar Tae) was a ruler of Phanthumburi, in present-day Suphan Buri province, mentioned in the Northern Chronicle. According to the chronicle, he was descended from a ruler of Hanthawaddy. He is also mentioned in stories about the building and repair of Buddhist temples in Suphan Buri.

== History ==
According to the Northern Chronicle, Kar Tayy repaired three temples named Wat Prot Sat, Wat Phu Khao Thong and Wat Yai. He later ordered his relative Mon Noi to build Wat Sanam Chai and repair Wat Pa Lelai in Phanthumburi.

The chronicle states that after the temples were repaired, 2,000 people became Buddhist monks. The city was then named Songphanburi (สองพันบุรี). Kar Tayy also gave farmland to the temples.

According to the chronicle, Kar Tayy ruled for 40 years and died in Chula Sakarat 565 (1203 CE).

The Thailand Cultural Encyclopedia also mentions the story of Kar Tayy ordering Mon Noi to build Wat Sanam Chai and repair Wat Pa Lelai.

Wat Sanam Chai is an ancient temple in Mueang Suphan Buri district. The Fine Arts Department excavated its main chedi in 1961. The site shows evidence of building and repair work from different periods.
