= Lam Tha Wa =

Watercourse in Thailand

Coordinates: 14°30′34″N 100°01′17″E

Lam Tha Wa (Thai: ลำท่าว้า, pronounced [lām.tʰâːwáː]), otherwise known as Khlong Tha Wa and Maenam Tha Wa is a watercourse of the central floodplains in Thailand, a tributary of the Tha Chin river, part of the Chao Phraya river basin.

It originates from the separation of the Tha Chin river near Bueng Chawak, Suphan Buri province, where it is referred to as the Lam Tha Khoi or Maenam Duan, and flows parallel to the Tha Chin river through Sam Chuk district, where it is referred to as Khlong Rakam, then flows southward near the four sacred ponds (Sa Kaeo, Sa Ka, Sa Yommana, Saket) (Note: Four ponds in downtown Suphan Buri that the water was used in the coronation of Thai monarchs in each reign.). It continues to flow south up till it meets with Khlong Bang Yi Sae form the Song Phi Nong river. The Song Phi Nong river continues southward up till it confluence the Tha Chin river again at Song Phi Nong district, southernmost part of Suphan Buri.

The watercourse is believed that it is the old course of Tha Chin river. Around 3,000 years ago, the Tha Chin river basin was a sea. Subsequently, there was a change in geomorphology thus resulting in the Tha Chin river and the old course Tha Chin has reduced its size to only a small and narrow waterway, the present Lam Tha Wa.

Its name "Tha Wa" is believed to be distorted from the word "La Wa" (Note: The name used to refer to the Lua people in the central region.) or "Lua", an ethnic group used to settle in the watershed in the past.

Historically, the paths that the watercourse flows through are all settlements of ancient communities that are older than Tha Chin riverside communities. Some of them are contemporary with the Dvaravati and Bayon eras of Cambodian history. In addition, it was also used as the route of King Rama V's waterway in 1902.

Today, Lam Tha Wa is shallow and full of pollution. There is an effort from the local government to improve and dredge to bring it back to a perfect stream condition like in the past.

== See also ==
- List of tributaries of the Chao Phraya River
