= Khlong Chorakhe Sam Phan =

Watercource in Thailand

Coordinates: 14°20′40.67″N 99°52′23.63″E

Khlong Chorakhe Sam Phan (Thai: คลองจระเข้สามพัน or คลองจรเข้สามพัน, pronounced [kʰlɔ̄ːŋ t͡ɕɔ̄ː.rā.kʰêː sǎːm pʰān]), also called Maenam Chorakhe Sam Phan or Lam Chorakhe Sam Phan, is a watercourse in the provinces of Kanchanaburi and Suphan Buri, Thailand. It is a tributary of the Tha Chin River.

Its name translates roughly as "three thousand crocodiles," presumably because of the past abundance of crocodiles, or possibly referring to three species of crocodiles. This river is considered to be of historical and archaeological importance because the watershed area at U Thong District, Suphan Buri, used to be an ancient community. Excavations have uncovered an antique carved jade resembling a crocodile or makara. Moreover, U Thong was formerly called Chorakhe Sam Phan. Moreover, U Thong in the past, was called Chorakhe Sam Phan.

Khlong Chorakhe Sam Phan separates from the Thuan River in Kanchanaburi; it then flows through Phanom Thuan District and U Thong District before converging with the Tha Wa River at Ban Phai Ngoi. After that, it flows past Bang Li Market in Song Phi Nong District, Suphanburi, to the mouth of Khlong Song Phi Nong and finally converges with the Tha Chin River.
