= Paul Wheatley (geographer) =

Historical geographer

Paul Wheatley (Stroud, Gloucestershire, England, 11 October 1921 – Porter County, Indiana, 30 October 1999) was a geographer who came to specialize in the historical geography of Southeast Asia and East Asia.

He was professor of geography and history, University of California at Berkeley 1958–1966; professor of geography, University College London 1966–1971; professor of geography and history, University of Chicago 1971–1977, where he was Irving B. Harris Professor and chairman of the Committee on Social Thought 1977–1991 (Emeritus).

He married Margaret Ashworth in 1957, and the couple had two sons, Julian and Jonathan.

== Honors and awards ==
He was awarded the Citation for Meritorious Contributions to the Field of Geography for "two decades of productive enquiry" by The Association of American Geographers in 1974. He was president of the Association for Asian Studies in 1976, and fellow of the American Academy of Arts and Sciences (1976) and of the British Academy (1986). He received an honorary LL.D. from University College London in 1975.

== Education and career ==
After serving as navigator in the Bomber Command and the Pathfinder Group 205 in World War II, Wheatley took a degree in geography at Liverpool University, at first specializing in English historical geography. When he moved to University College, London, he became interested in the historical geography of Southeast Asia and China, then moved to University of Malaya, in Malaysia, then University of California, Berkeley, returned for a time to University College, and finally to University of Chicago, where he stayed from 1971 until retiring in 1991.

== Scholarly interests and contributions ==
Wheatley's obituary says of him that he was a "man of ideas, of exacting standards and often of forceful expression. He was the first British geographer to explore sources in Chinese and Arabic as well as in English for the historical geography of South-East Asia and the Arab world. Only the grand thesis was good enough for him."

Another memorialist wrote, "Scholars who study the relationship between place and power have drawn on his city as cosmomagical center for religious, ritual, and political activities. The cohesive force of Wheatley's pivotal 'si fang zhi ji' (The Pivot of the Four Quarters) can be felt today not only in Shang studies but in the analysis of Aztec cities."

== Major works ==
- —— (1961). The Golden Khersonese : Studies in the Historical Geography of the Malay Peninsula before A.D. 1500. Kuala Lumpur: University of Malaya Press.
- —— (1971). The Pivot of the Four Quarters; a Preliminary Enquiry into the Origins and Character of the Ancient Chinese City. Chicago: Aldine. ISBN 978-0-85224-174-5.
  - M. A. Morgan of the University of Bristol described the book as "widely acclaimed as a major piece of scholarship". Marwyn S. Samuels of the University of British Columbia described it as "prodigious".
- —— (1978). From Court to Capital: A Tentative Interpretation of the Origins of the Japanese Urban Tradition. with Thomas See. Chicago: University of Chicago. ISBN 978-0-226-89430-0.
- —— (1983). Nagara and Commandery : Origins of the Southeast Asian Urban Traditions. Chicago: University of Chicago, Dept. of Geography. ISBN 978-0-89065-113-1.
- Wheatley, Paul (2001). The Places Where Men Pray Together : Cities in Islamic Lands, Seventh through the Tenth Centuries. Chicago: University of Chicago Press. ISBN 978-0-226-89428-7.
- —— (2008). The Origins and Character of the Chinese City. New Brunswick, New Jersey: AldineTransaction, A Division of Transaction Pub. ISBN 978-0-202-36202-1.
