= Khun Luang Wilangka =

13th King of the Lawa people of Raming Nakhon

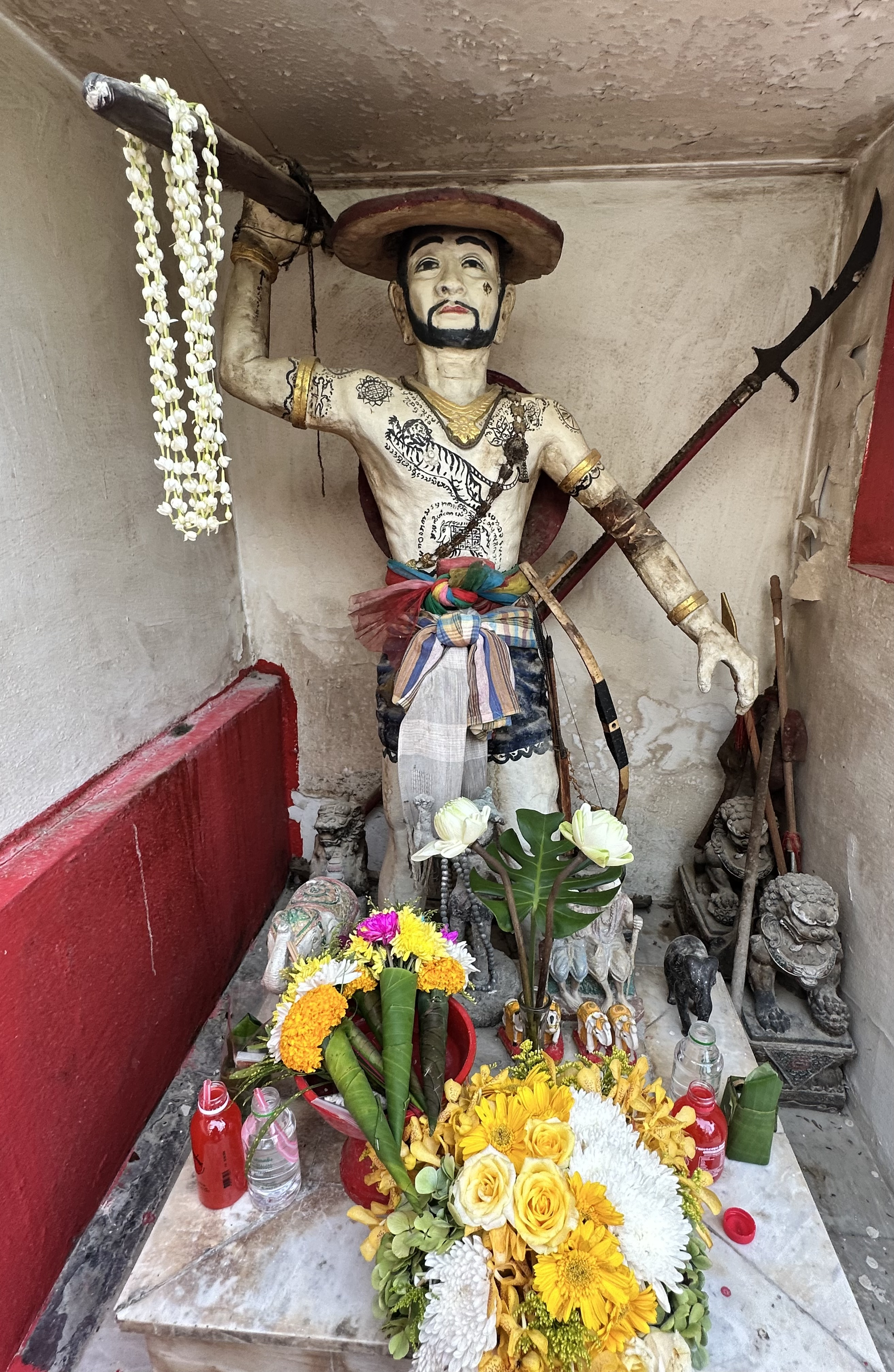
Statue of Khun Luang Wilangka in a shrine at Wat Phra That Doi Kham.

Khun Luang Wilangka (Thai: ขุนหลวงวิลังคะ), also known as Wirangkha or Milangkha, was a ruler of the Lawa people in the legends of northern Thailand. He is described as the 13th king of Raming Nakhon, an ancient city in the area of present-day Chiang Mai.

According to the legend, Wilangka wanted to marry Queen Camadevi, the first ruler of Hariphunchai, but she refused his proposal. He later fought against Hariphunchai and was defeated. One account states that he led an army of 80,000 men against the city.

The story of Khun Luang Wilangka remains part of the traditions of the Lawa people. He is remembered in local communities, where shrines and ceremonies honour him. The legends also describe conflicts between the Lawa and Mon people in the Chiang Mai and Lamphun area.

== Narrative ==
Khun Luang Wilangka appears in legends about Queen Camadevi, the first ruler of Hariphunchai. He is described as a ruler of the Lawa people who lived near Doi Suthep. He was also said to have ruled Raming Nakhon, a city in the area of present-day Chiang Mai. The legends tell of conflicts between the Lawa and the Mon people. The dates of these events are uncertain.

According to the legend, upon hearing news of the beauty of Camadevi, who had come from the Lavo Kingdom to rule Hariphunchai, Wilangka wanted to marry her. He sent a marriage proposal to her, but she refused. Wilangka then threatened to attack Hariphunchai.

In one version of the story, Camadevi challenged Wilangka to throw a spear from Doi Suthep towards Hariphunchai. If the spear reached the city, she would agree to marry him. Wilangka threw his spear, which landed outside the northwestern city wall of Hariphunchai. Camadevi feared that he might succeed on his second attempt.

Camadevi then sent Wilangka a headdress made using cloth stained with her menstrual blood. Some versions also mention betel prepared with the blood. According to the belief in the story, these objects would weaken his supernatural powers. Wilangka accepted the gifts and wore the headdress. When he threw his spear again, it fell short and landed near the foot of Doi Suthep.

Another version of the legend tells of a challenge to build a chedi. Camadevi asked Wilangka to build a chedi like the one at Hariphunchai. Wilangka returned to his territory and completed the chedi. Camadevi then prayed that the chedi would be damaged if she had enough merit to rule Hariphunchai without marrying him. The chedi tilted towards Hariphunchai, and Wilangka was considered to have lost the challenge. The chedi became known as Chedi Khi Ti (เจดีย์ขี้ติ).

The legends also give different accounts of Wilangka's death. One version states that he was heartbroken after losing his chance to marry Camadevi. Another version says that he left his city and went to live in the forest. Before his death, he asked his followers to bury him on a high mountain overlooking Hariphunchai. He then threw his spear into the air and allowed it to fall into his chest.

== Legacy and shrine ==
Khun Luang Wilangka is honored in some Lawa communities in Northern Thailand. There are shrines and monuments dedicated to him. One monument is located in Hot district, Chiang Mai province. In 2021, local officials and community groups planned to replace the monument after it was damaged by a fallen tree.

According to local tradition, several mountains were named after musical instruments carried by musicians in Wilangka's funeral procession. The musicians became separated from the procession, and the mountains were named Doi Khong (Gong Mountain), Doi Klong (Drum Mountain), Doi Ching (Cymbal Mountain) and Doi Sawa. Another place, Khiu Maeo Plio, was named after a bamboo coffin cover called maeo, which was blown away by the wind. The mountain now known as Mon Jam was formerly called Doi Khwam Long, meaning "Coffin-Fall Mountain". The name comes from the story that Wilangka's coffin overturned there. A shrine stands at the place where he is believed to have been buried.

In Ban Mueang Ka, Mae Rim district, some Lawa villagers believe that they are descendants of Khun Luang Wilangka. Local tradition says that his spirit lives in three places: Doi Khwam Long, the shrine at Ban Mueang Ka, and the Doi Kham area south of Doi Suthep. Villagers hold ceremonies to honour his spirit.

At Doi Kham, Wat Phra That Doi Kham has a monument to Wilangka in the temple courtyard near the chedi. Local tradition also identifies Doi Kham as a place where the spirits of Pu Sae and Ya Sae live. They are regarded as ancestors of Wilangka. A buffalo-offering ritual for Pu Sae and Ya Sae is recorded as taking place annually or once every three years.

Another local legend concerns the abandoned temple of Wat Sali Phan Ton (วัดสะหลีพันตน) at Ban Kad in Mae Wang district, Chiang Mai. According to one version, Queen Camadevi asked Wilangka to become a Buddhist after his defeat and built the temple for him. The temple was formerly called Wat Phra Chao Lua (วัดพระเจ้าลัวะ) or Wang Phra Chao Lua (วังพระเจ้าลัวะ).

== See also ==
- Lawa people
