= Wat Phra That Doi Kham =

Buddhist temple in Chiang Mai, Thailand

Coordinates: 18.75949°N 98.91885°E

- วัดพระธาตุดอยคำ
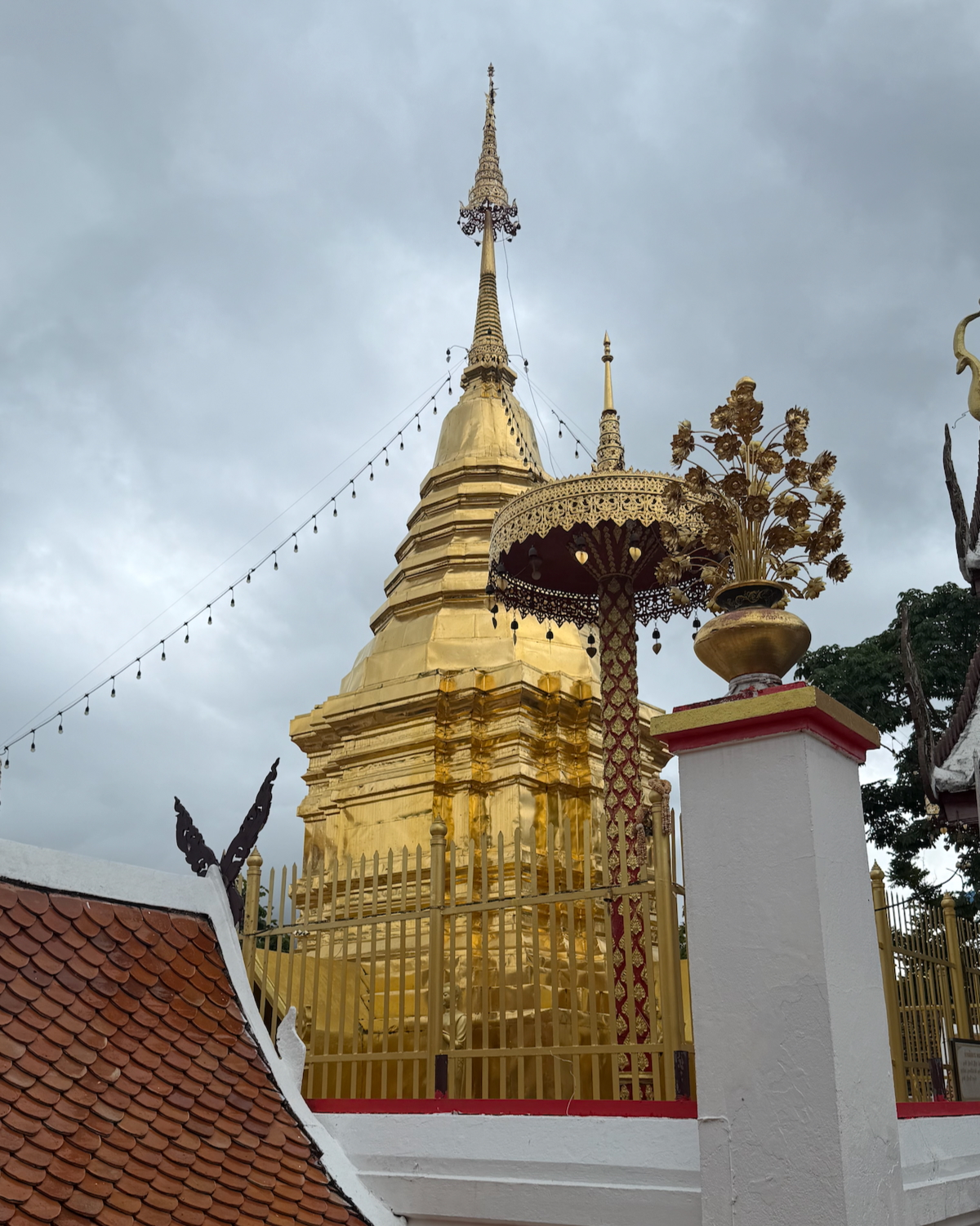
- Wat Phra That Doi Kham chedi

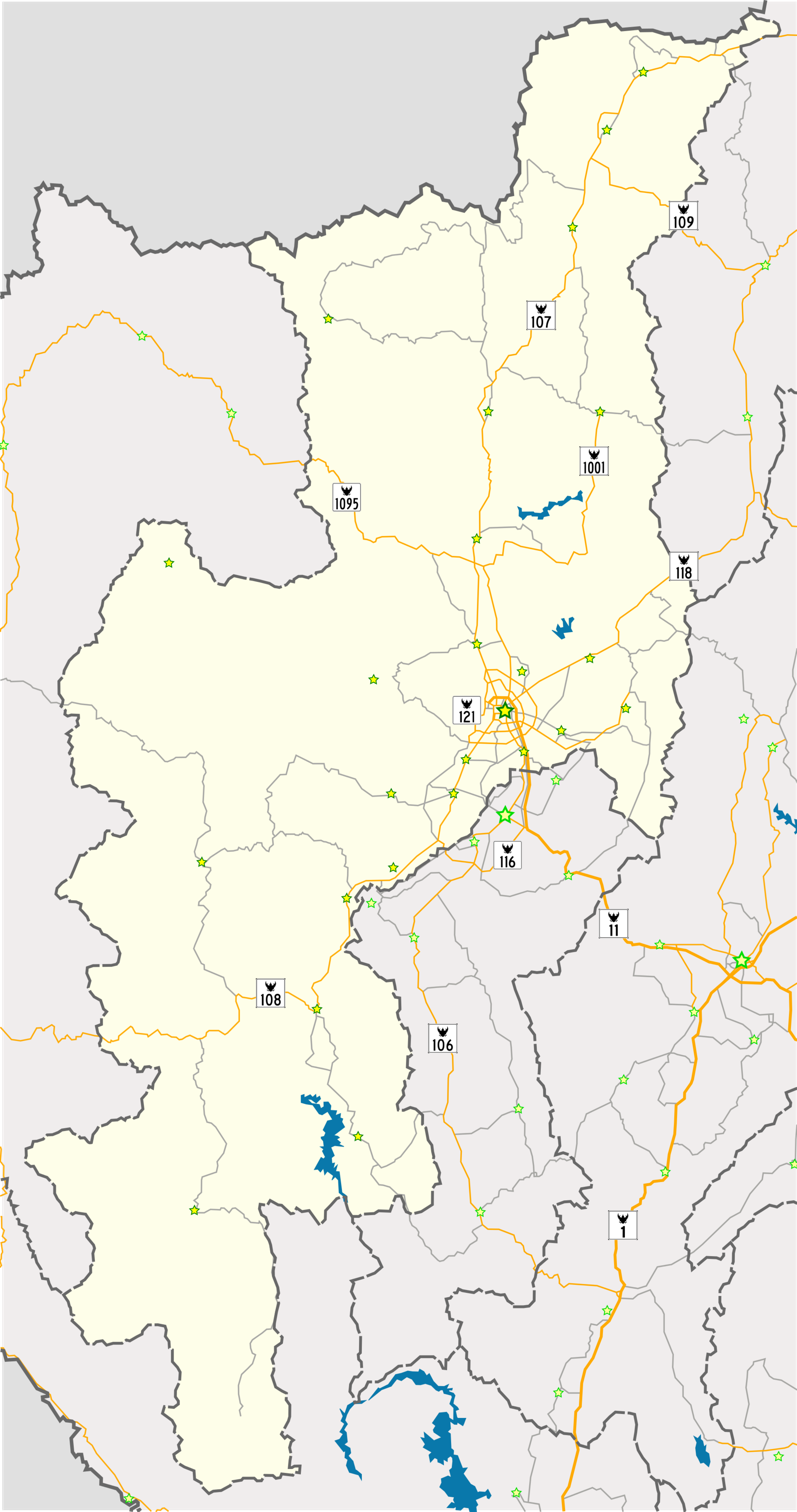
- Location within Chiang Mai Province Location within Thailand

Religion
- Affiliation: Buddhism
- District: Mae Hia sub-district
- Province: Chiang Mai Province
- Region: Northern Thailand
- Status: Active

Location
- Municipality: Chiang Mai
- Country: Thailand

Architecture
- Founder: Two sons of Queen Camadevi
- Completed: 687

Wat Phra That Doi Kham (Thai: วัดพระธาตุดอยคำ; lit. 'Temple of the Golden Mountain's Relic') is a Buddhist temple in the Mae Hia sub-district, Chiang Mai, Thailand. Situated atop Doi Kham hill at an elevation of approximately 200 meters above sea level, the temple is a significant historical and religious site that enshrines relics of the Buddha. Its original name was Wat Suwannabanpot (Thai: วัดสุวรรณบรรพต; 'Golden Mountain Temple'). The temple houses the sacred Buddha hair relic, the 1,300-year-old chedi, and a 17-meter-tall seated Buddha image.

== Name ==
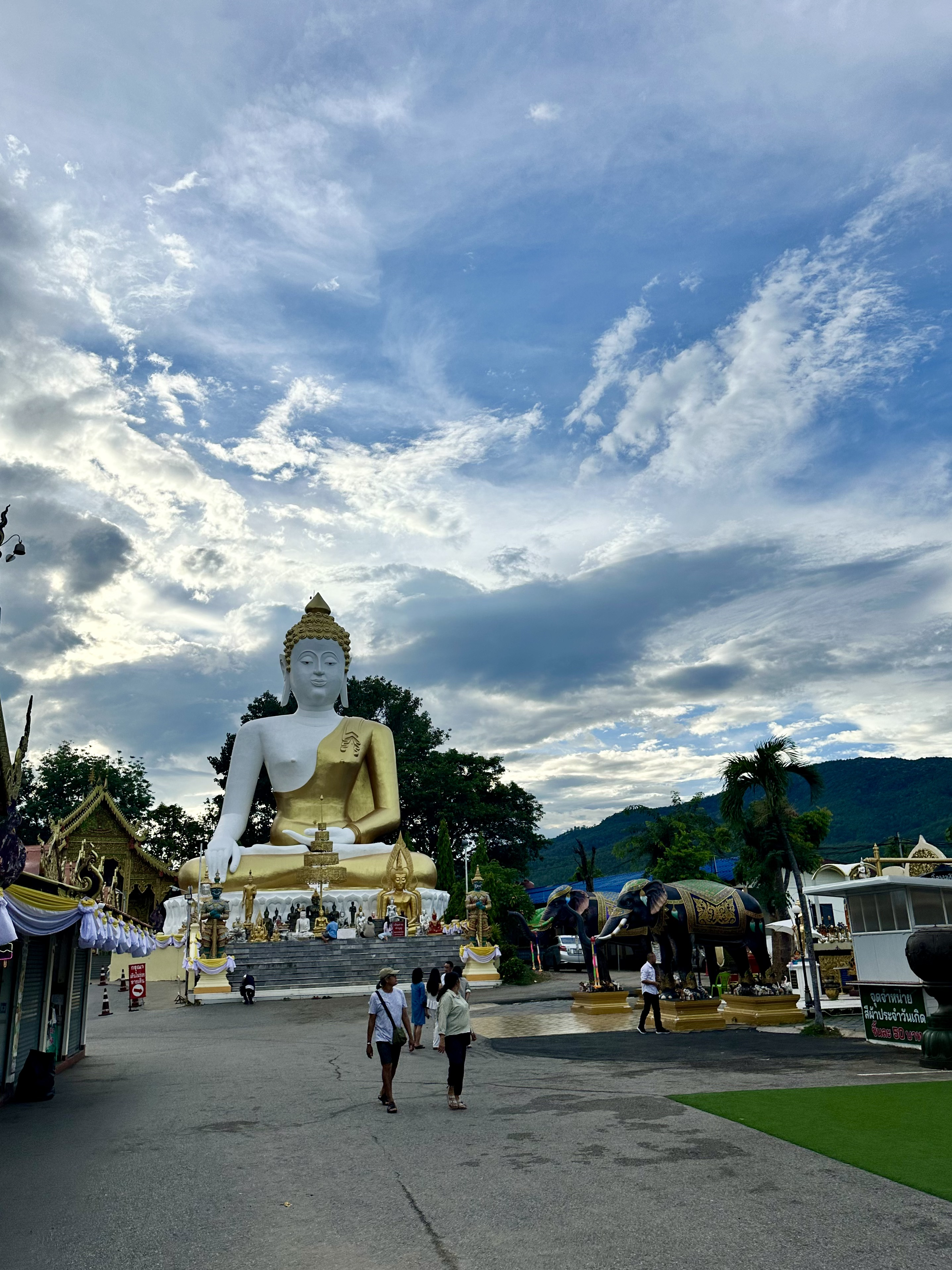
17-meter-tall seated Buddha image.

The name 'Doi Kham' originates from an auspicious omen that occurred after the two giants received the holy hair relic from the Lord Buddha. Following this, it rained heavily for many days. The rainwater eroded and washed gold minerals from the mountainside and streams, carrying them in large quantities down to the mouth of a cave. For this reason, this mountain came to be called 'Doi Kham,' meaning 'Mountain of Gold'.

== History ==
According to temple chronicles and local histories, Wat Phra That Doi Kham was founded in the year 1230 of the Buddhist Era (687 AD) during the Hariphunchai Kingdom period. It was established by two sons of Queen Camadevi, the first ruler of Hariphunchai (modern-day Lamphun). The primary purpose of its founding was to enshrine a sacred hair relic of the Gautama Buddha, which had been presented to the local Lawa people.

For centuries, the temple fell into disrepair and was largely abandoned. Its modern revitalization began in 1966 when, after heavy rains, the ancient chedi collapsed. This event led to the discovery of a treasure trove of historical artifacts within the stupa, including various Buddha images such as Phra Rod Luang and Phra Sam Hom. The discovery spurred a community-led restoration effort, re-establishing Wat Phra That Doi Kham as a major center for Buddhist worship.

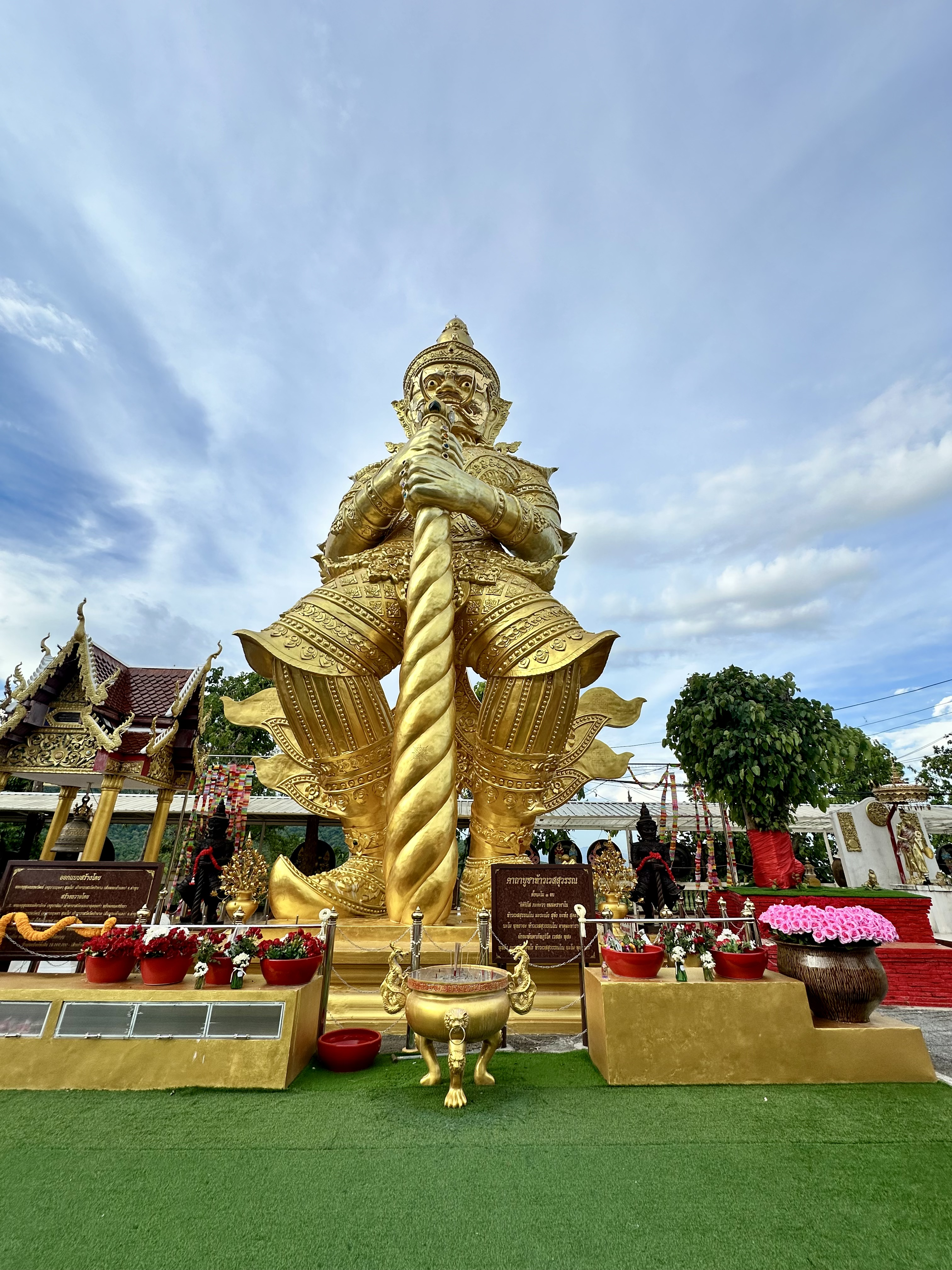
Statue of Thao Wessuwan.

The annual bathing ceremony of the Buddha relics is held on the 7th and 8th waning days following Visakha Bucha Day. This occasion is believed to commemorate the cremation of the Buddha’s remains, which, according to tradition, took place eight days after his Parinirvana. The event is considered a significant day in Buddhism and usually falls on the 8th waning moon of the month of Visakha (the sixth month in the Thai lunar calendar). At Wat Phra That Doi Kham, this day is observed with a ceremonial bathing of the relics to honor and reflect upon the virtues of the Buddha (Buddha-khun), his teachings (Dhamma-khun), and the monastic community (Sangha-khun), as a tribute to their role in spreading the Buddhist faith.

The temple is home to a 19-metre-tall statue of Thao Wessuwan, which is claimed to be the largest of its kind in the world. During the installation process in August 2024, the project faced significant public criticism and opposition from residents of Chiang Mai and social media users. Concerns centered on the statue’s scale and its potential impact on the temple’s historic and religious character. The construction was reported to cost approximately 17 million baht, excluding the cost of gold plating.

== Legends ==
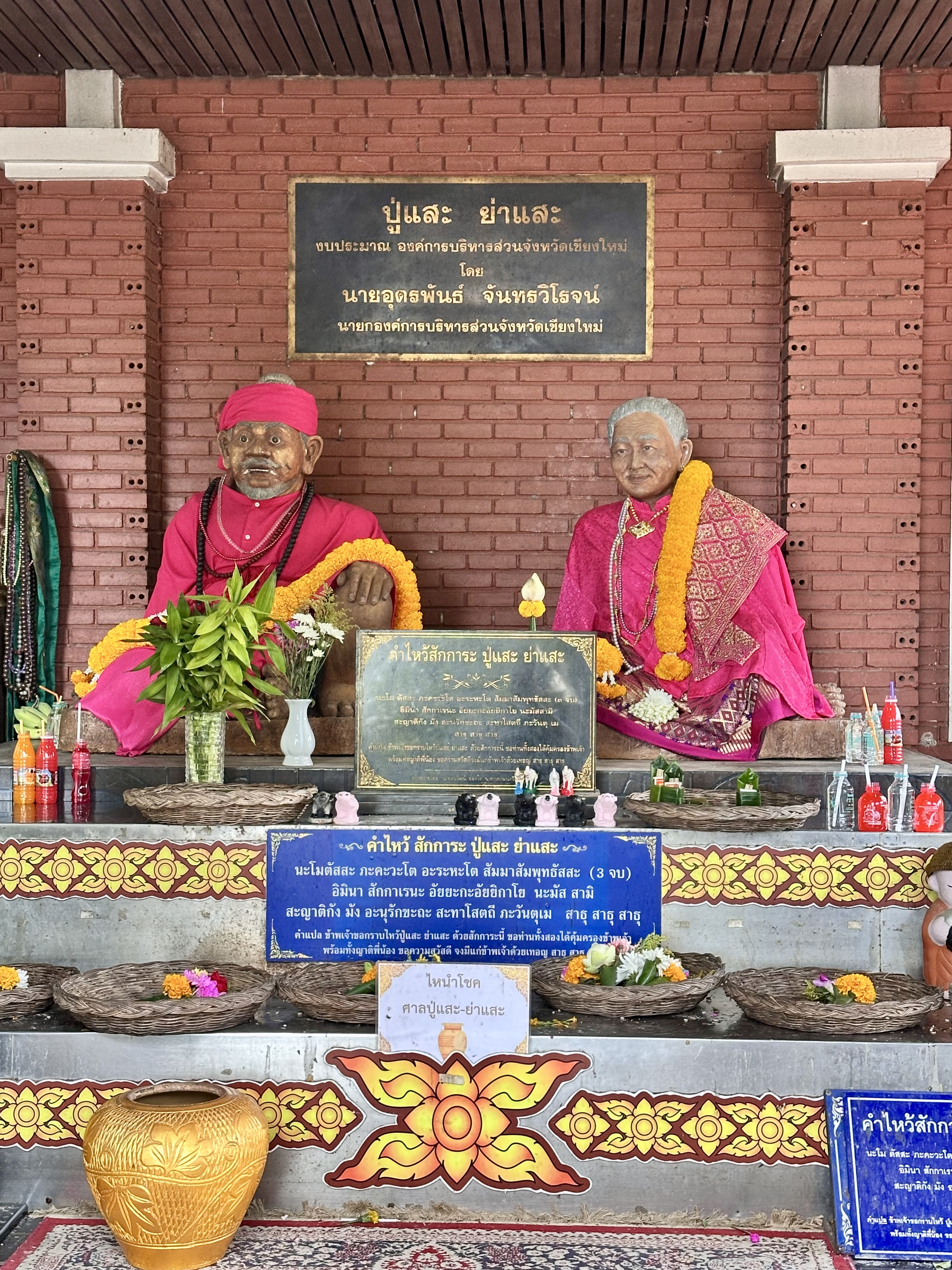
The shrine of Pu Sae and Ya Sae.

According to legend, the giants (yaksha) Pu Sae and Ya Sae (Grandfather Sae and Grandmother Sae), who are believed to be the original inhabitants and guardians of the Doi Kham mountain area. The legend states that they were once cannibalistic but were converted to Buddhism after an encounter with the Gautama Buddha during his travels.

The Buddha taught them the Five Precepts, and they renounced their former ways. In return for their protection of the faith and the local people, they requested permission to be allowed a buffalo sacrifice once a year. This legend forms the basis of the annual "Liang Phi Pu Sae Ya Sae" (เลี้ยงผีปู่แสะย่าแสะ) ceremony, a unique shamanistic ritual still practiced by the local community to honor these guardian spirits. A shrine dedicated to the giants stands at the foot of the hill. Their son is said to have become the revered hermit Sudeva, who later played a role in the founding of Lamphun and whose name is lent to the nearby Doi Suthep mountain.
