= Suphrom =

Suphrom Ruesi (Thai: ฤๅษีสุพรหม), also known as Suphrom Yana (สุพรหมยาน), is a hermit in legends about the founding of Khelang Nakhon, now Lampang, Thailand. According to local tradition, he lived at Doi Ngam in present-day Lampang province.

== Legendary accounts ==
Suphrom appears in legends relating to both Hariphunchai and Khelang Nakhon, the city later known as Lampang. In traditions about Hariphunchai, he is named alongside Sudeva, Sukkadanta, Anusisa, and Jalita. A version of the legend recorded by Chiang Mai University states that the five men entered the Buddhist monastic order during the lifetime of the Buddha but later left the order and became hermits. They were said to have gained supernatural powers and later appeared in legends about Camadevi and Hariphunchai.

According to the legend of Khelang Nakhon, Anantayod, the younger twin son of Camadevi, wanted to establish a new city. He was advised to seek help from the hermit Suphrom. Anantayod travelled with a hunter named Khelang to meet Suphrom at Doi Ngam. Suphrom selected a site west of the Wang River for the new city. The city was named Khelang Nakhon after the hunter.

The legend also states that Anantayod later invited Camadevi to Khelang Nakhon. A settlement called Alampang was established west of the city for her residence.

== Places in the legends ==
A local legend links Suphrom to Wat Mon Phaya Chae in Lampang. According to the story, Suphrom knew how to prepare medicine that could restore youth. A Lawa ruler named Wuttho travelled from Khun Mae Raming in present-day Chiang Mai province to ask for the treatment. Wuttho entered a bath containing the medicine but later died. The place where he died became known as Mon Phaya Chae. A chedi was later built there.

Another tradition says that Suphrom selected the site of Khelang Nakhon from a hill called Khuang Meng or Sanam Phon. From there, he pointed to a place west of the Wang River where the city would be built, near present-day Wat Phra Kaeo Don Tao. He is also said to have placed a stone called Pha Bong at the site of the new city.
