= Wat Chamadevi =

Buddhist temple in Lamphun, Thailand

Coordinates: 18°34′54″N 98°59′38″E

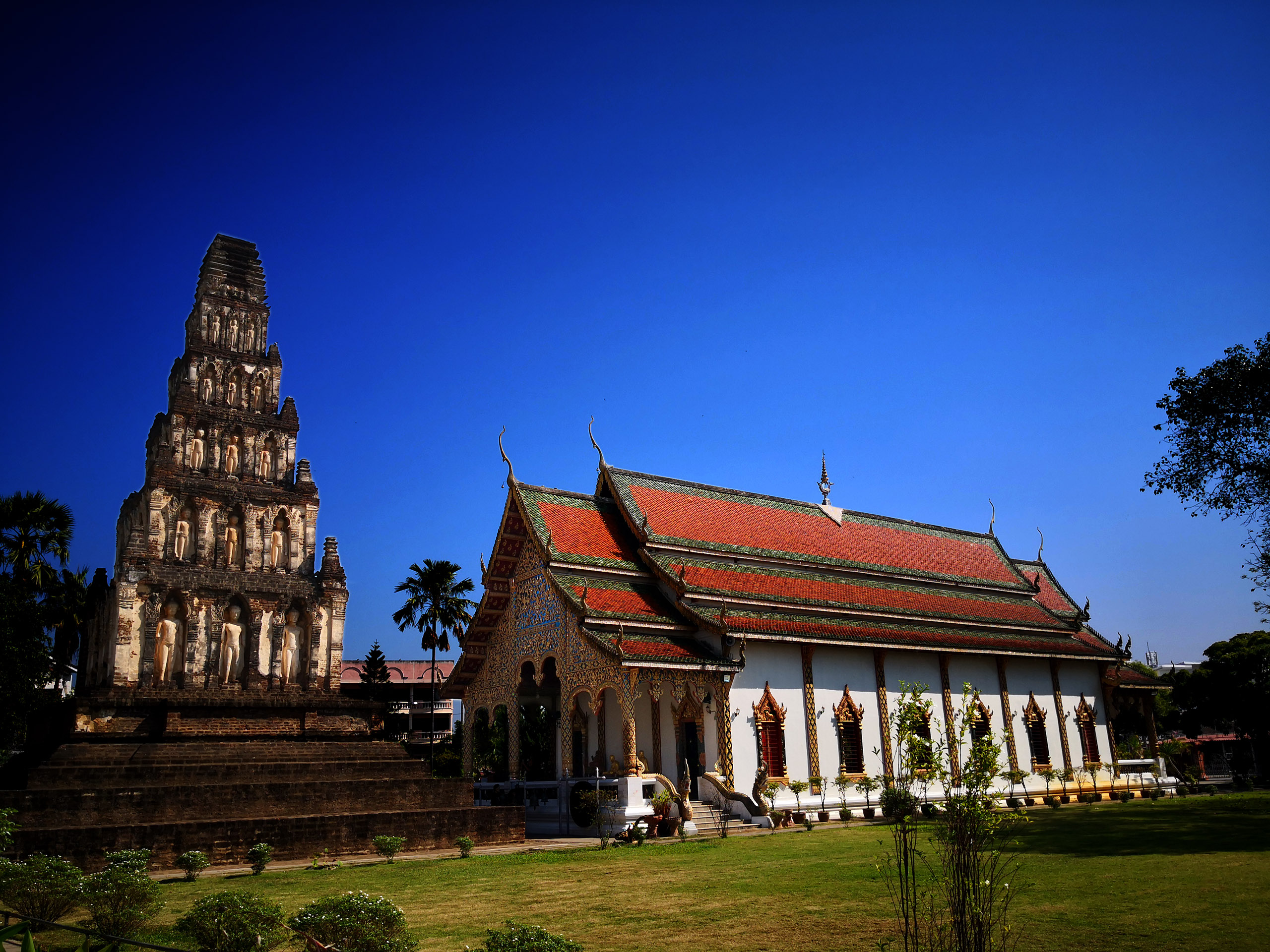
- Suwan Chang Kot Chedi and the viharn

Religion
- Affiliation: Buddhism
- Sect: Therevada Buddhism

Location
- Location: Chamadevi Road, Mueang Lamphun district, Lamphun, Lamphun province
- Country: Thailand
- Interactive map of Wat Chamadevi

Architecture
- Style: Mon Haripuñjaya
- Established: c. 8–11th century

Wat Chamadevi (Thai: วัดจามเทวี), also known as Wat Ku Kut (Thai: วัดกู่กุด), is a Buddhist temple in Lamphun, Northern Thailand. Built between the 8th and 11th centuries, it contains the only intact remains in Thailand of the Mon Dvaravati civilisation.

== History ==
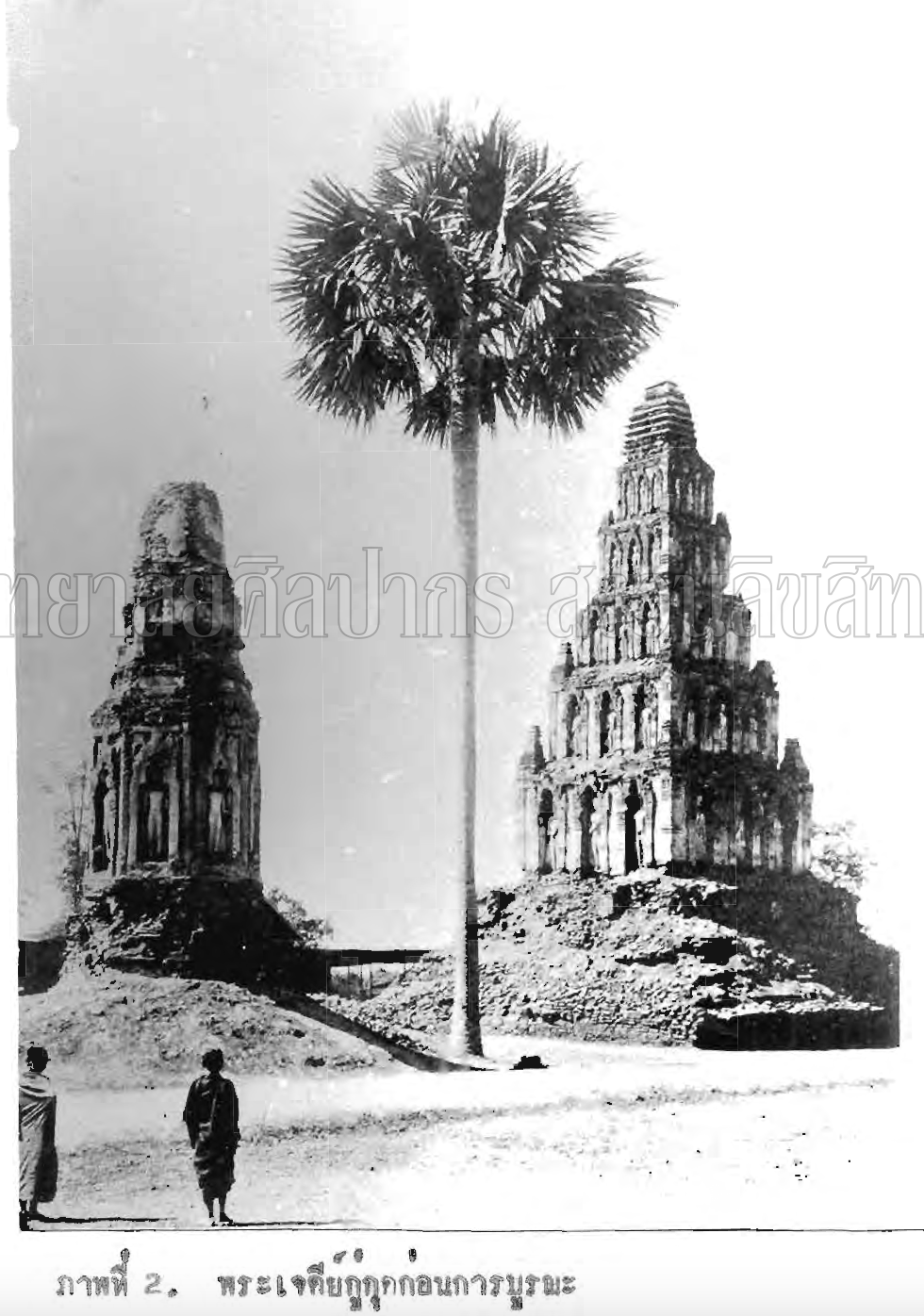
An undated image of the temple before restoration

The temple is believed to have been built sometime between the 8th and 11th centuries. No direct evidence has been found on the date of construction. Some sources suggest that it was built by Mahantayayot and Anantayot, the sons of Queen Chamadevi, the first monarch of the Mon Haripuñjaya kingdom, to enshrine their mother's ashes following her death in the 8th century. Other sources state that it may have been constructed later in the mid-11th century by King Athitayarat to commemorate his victory against the Khmer outside the walls of Haripuñjaya.

A Mon stele found at the site has an inscription referring to the extensive restoration of the temple in 1218 by King Saphasit following an earthquake. Recent restoration was carried out in the 1930s when it received its Royal Charter, and by the Fine Arts Department in the 1970s.

== Description ==
Wat Chamadevi is known for its two ancient chedis built between the 8th and 11th centuries in the Mon Haripuñjaya style which are the last complete monuments of the Dvaravati civilisation which have survived in Thailand.

The larger chedi known as the Mahapol chedi (or Suwan Chang Kot chedi) is square shaped pyramid of laterite consisting of five levels of decreasing size. The four sides of each tier have three niches containing Buddha images comprising 12 images at each level and a total of 60 images, all with the same iconography. Some sources state that the remains of Queen Chamadevi, the first monarch of the Haripuñjaya kingdom are enshrined within the chedi. The chedi at Wat Chedi Liam built by King Mengrai near Chiang Mai in 1303 is based on the design of the Mahapol chedi.

The smaller chedi, known as the Ratana chedi, and of similar age to the Mahapol chedi, is octagonal shaped and made of brick and mortar. It has eight standing Buddha images in niches in the first tier above the base.

Adjacent to the smaller chedi is a modern viharn which contains a mural depicting King Viranga of the Lawa people throwing a javelin. According to local legend, Viranga sought to marry Queen Chamadevi who agreed to accept his proposal provided he could throw one of three spears into Haripuñjaya from Doi Suthep. After he failed on the first two attempts when his magical powers were thwarted by the queen, inconsolable, he impaled himself on the third spear.

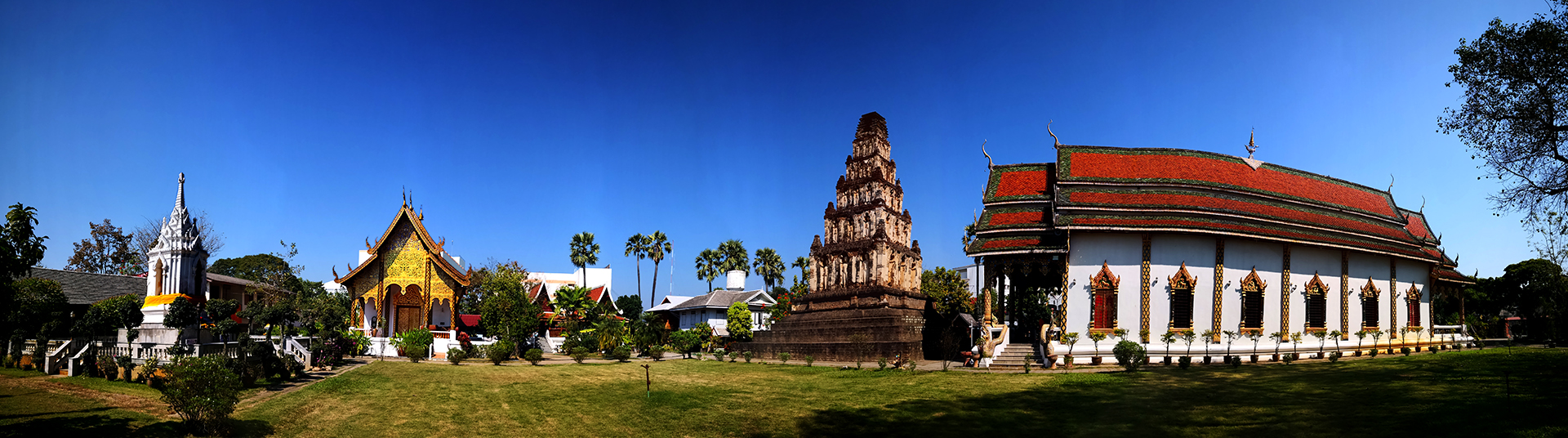

== Gallery ==
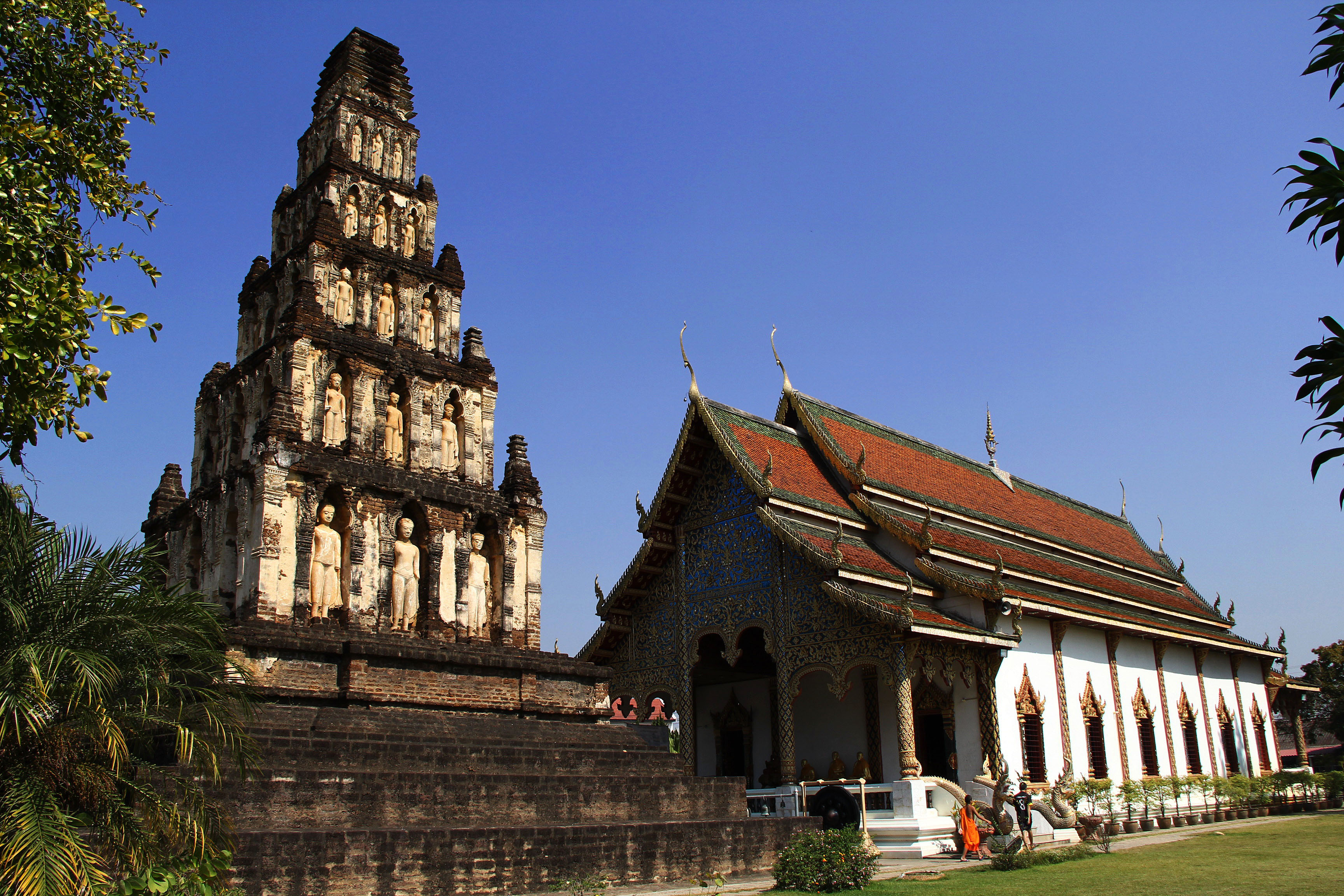

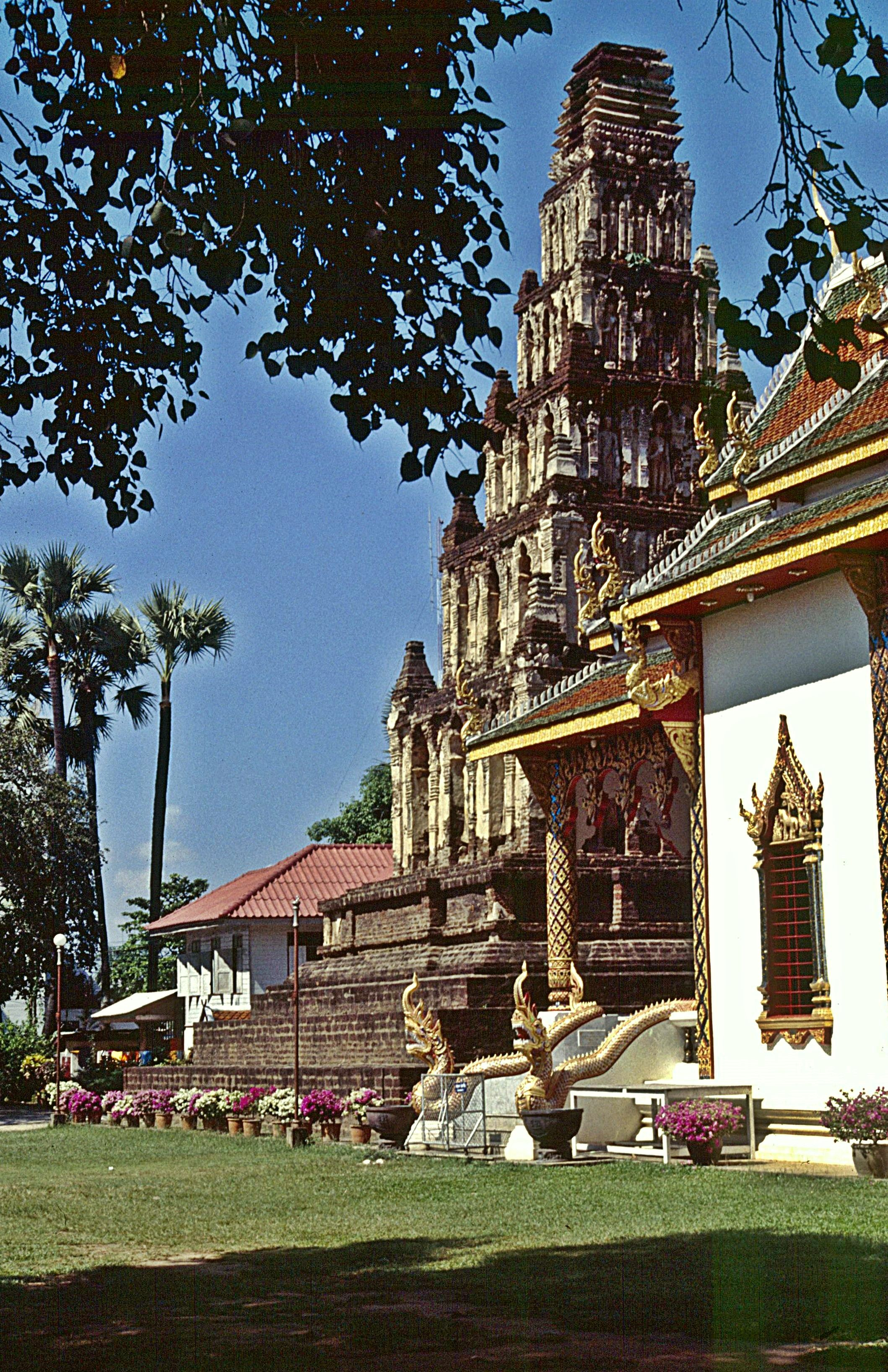

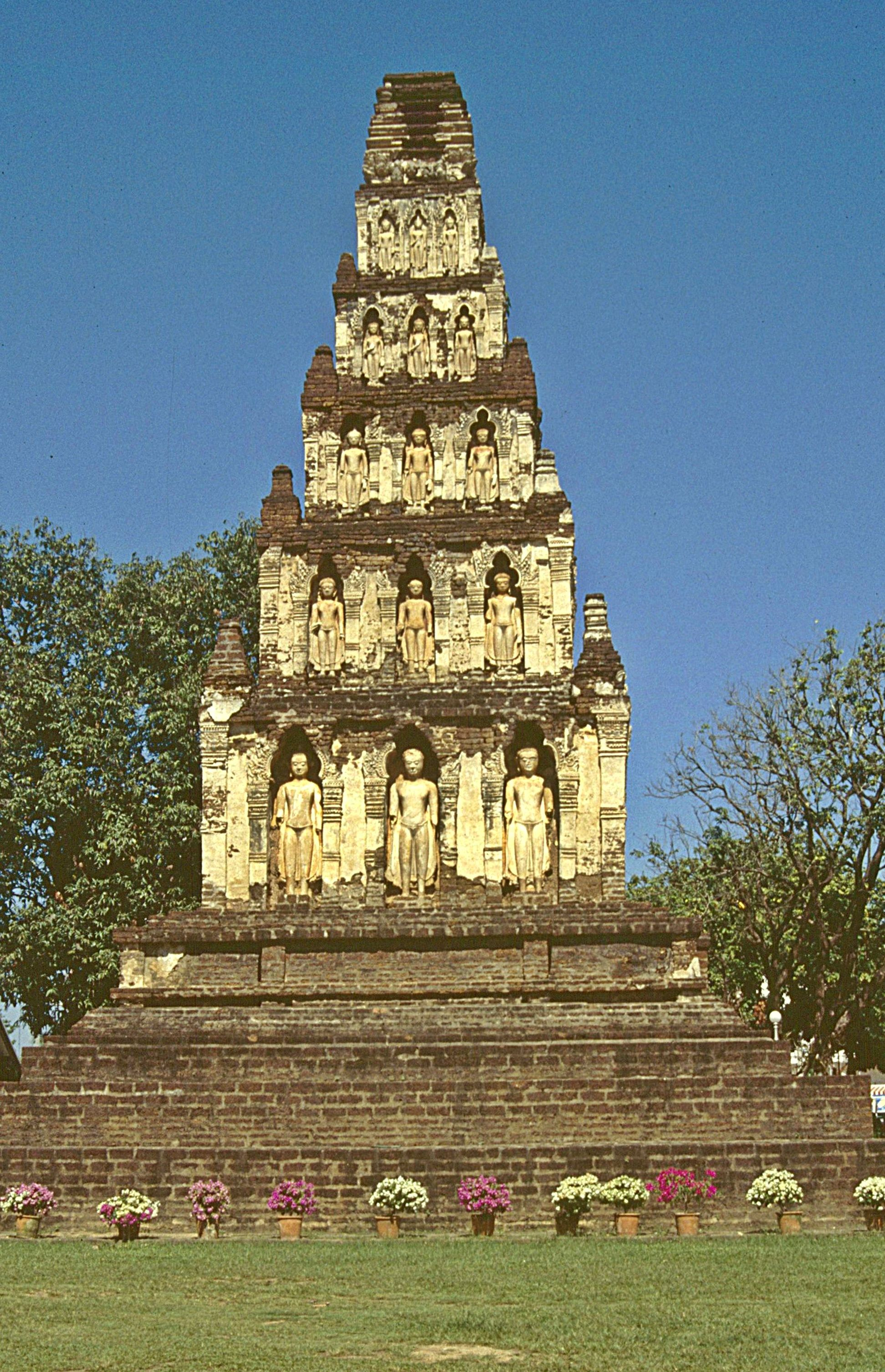

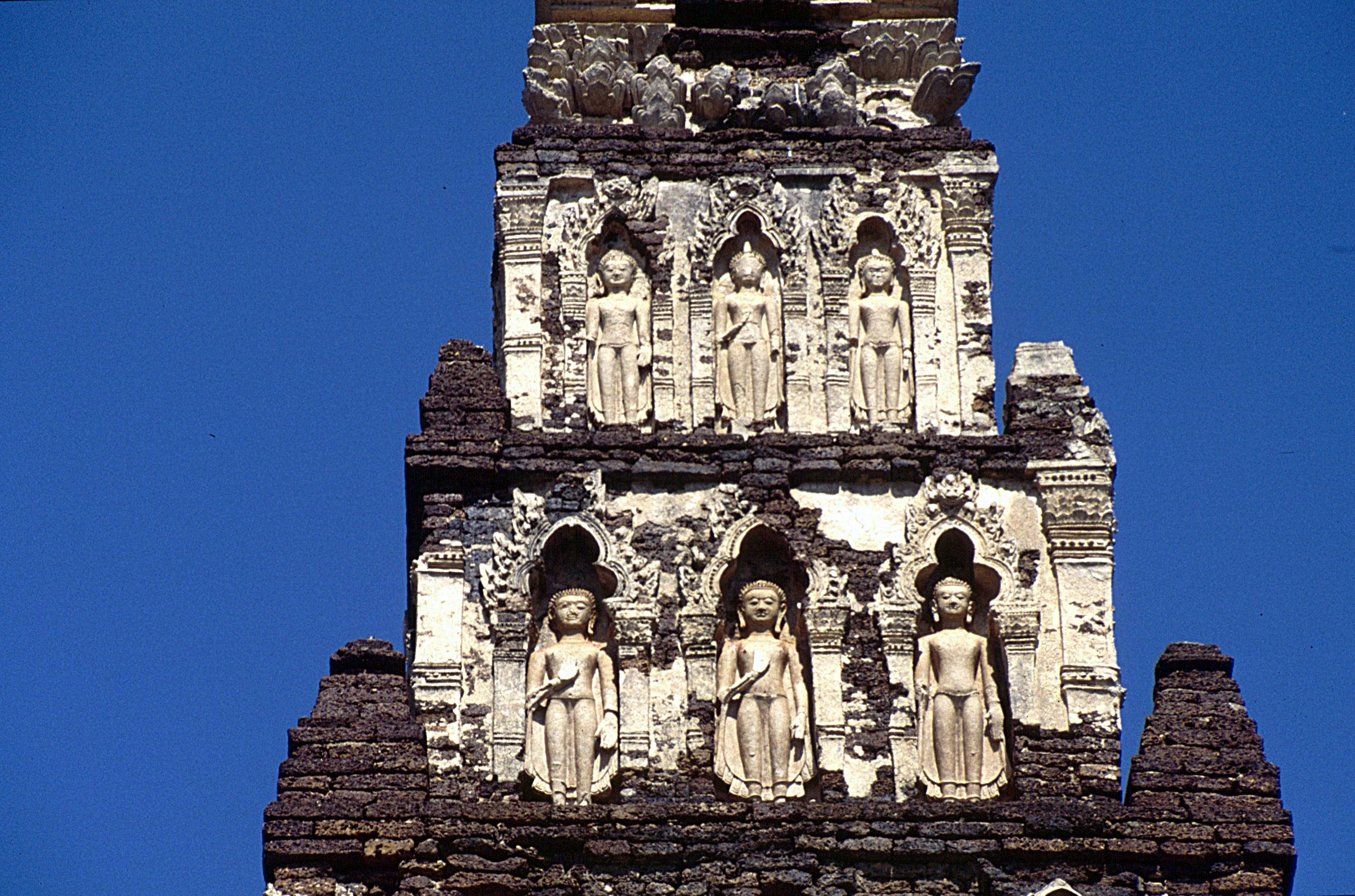

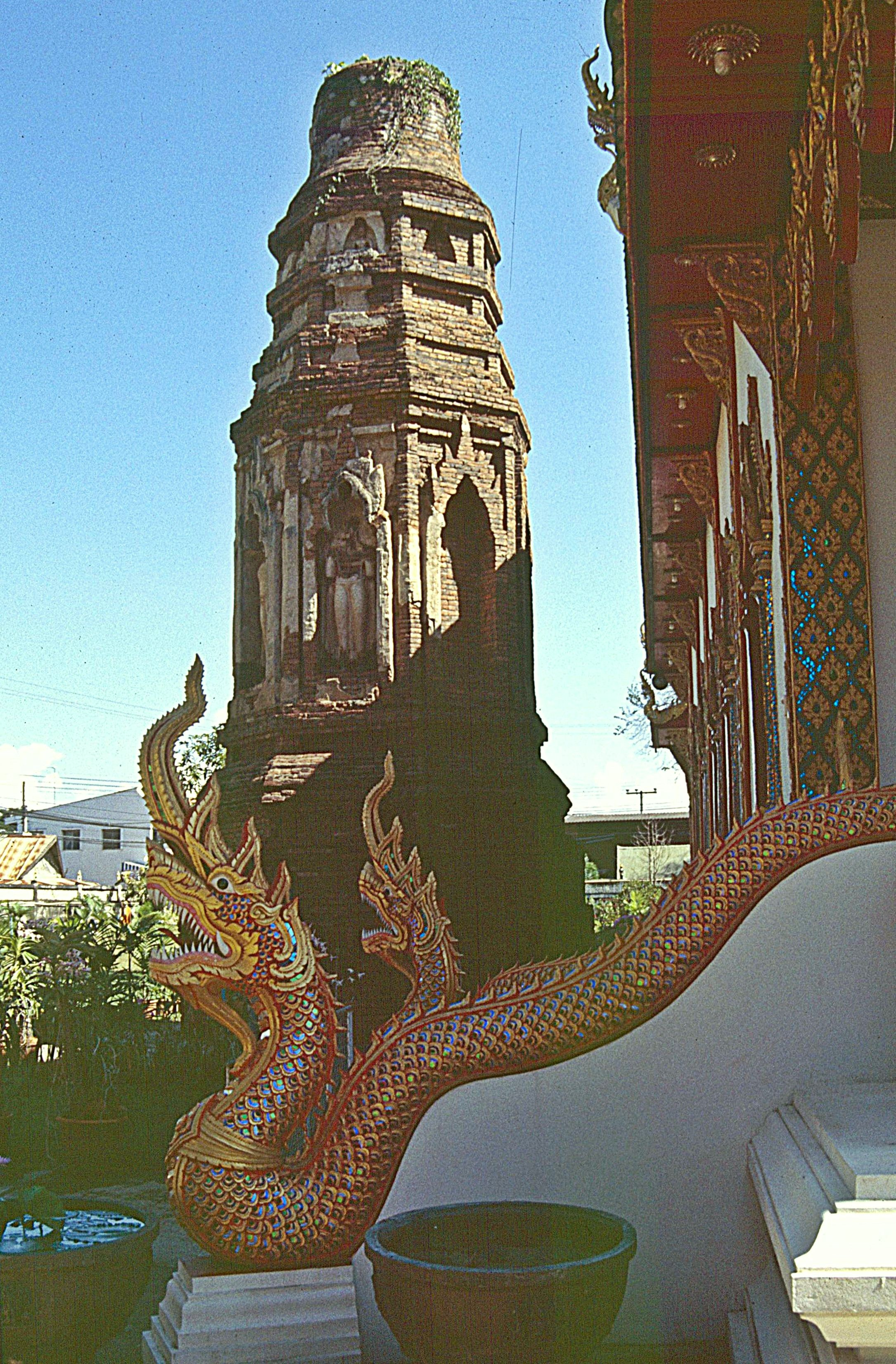
