= Sukkadanta =

Sukkadanta Ruesi
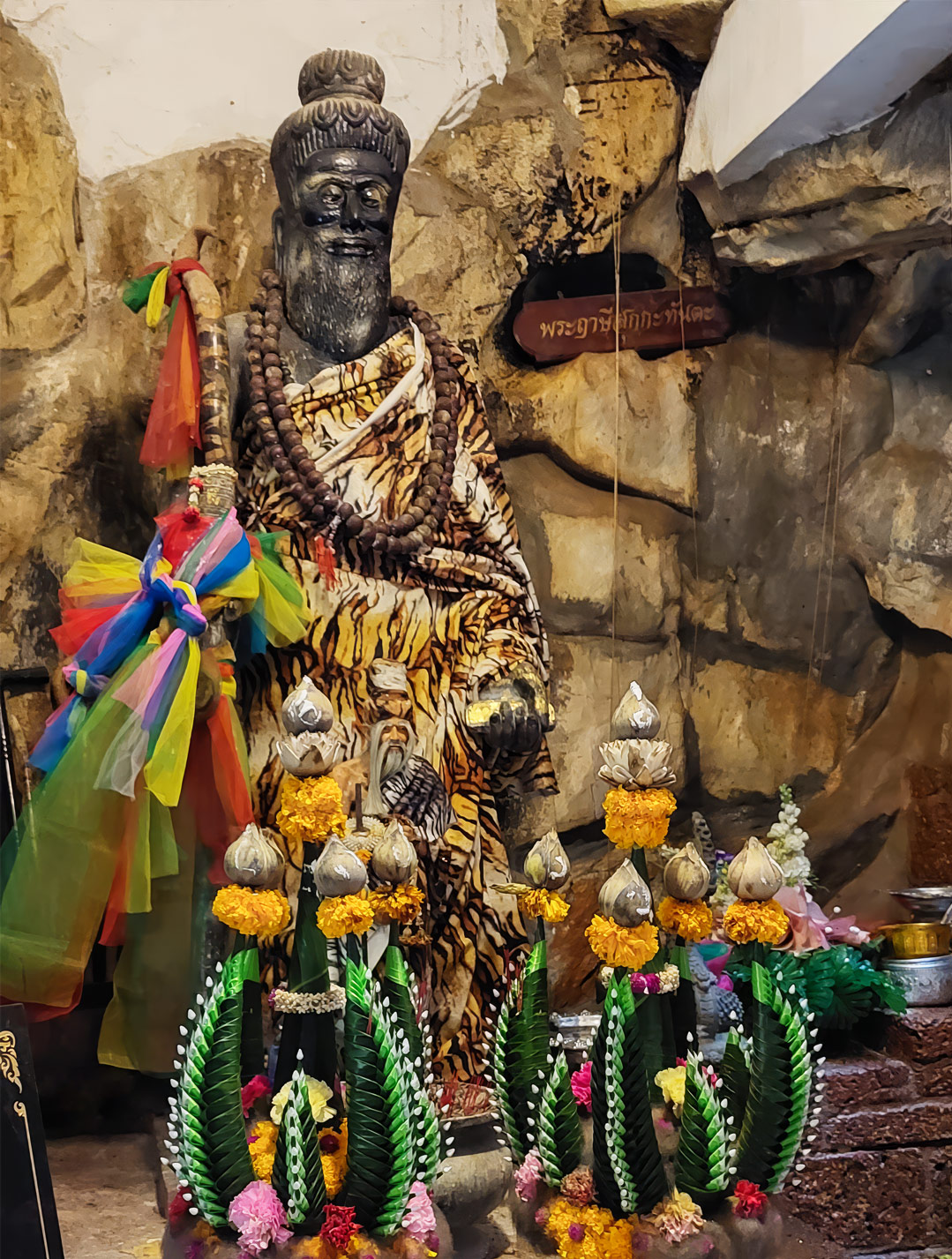
- Statue of Sukkadanta Ruesi at the Khao Samo Khon hermitage, Wat Khao Samo Khon, Lopburi province
- Affiliation: Hariphunchai founding traditions
- Region: Northern Thailand

Sukkadanta Ruesi (Thai: ฤๅษีสุกกทันตะ; also written Sukadanta or Suktanta) is a legendary hermit in the traditions of Hariphunchai, an ancient Mon kingdom in what is now Lamphun province, Thailand. According to local legends, he lived at Dhammika Mountain, now known as Khao Samo Khon, near Lopburi. He was said to have taught arts and sciences. In the legends of Camadevi, he was a companion of Vasuthep Ruesi and helped choose Camadevi as the ruler of Hariphunchai.

== Legendary accounts ==
Sukkadanta is said to have lived at Khao Samo Khon near Lopburi, in the area of the ancient Lavo Kingdom. According to the legend, Vasuthep, who lived near present-day Chiang Mai, sent a message to Sukkadanta asking him to help find a ruler for the new city of Hariphunchai in the Ping River valley.

Sukkadanta recommended Camadevi, the daughter of the ruler of Lavo. She was said to observe the Five Precepts and to have knowledge of various arts and subjects. The ruler of Lavo allowed her to travel to Hariphunchai.

One account states that Sukkadanta travelled with Kawayya, an envoy sent by Vasuthep, to invite Camadevi to rule Hariphunchai. Accounts of her journey differ in their descriptions of her family and how she became ruler.

A version of the Camadevi Chronicle names Sudeva, Sukkadanta, Anusisa, Jalita and Suphrom as five men who became Buddhist monks during the lifetime of the Buddha. They later left the monastic order and became hermits. The legend states that they gained supernatural powers.

The Thailand Cultural Encyclopedia also records that Vasuthep asked Sukkadanta to help choose a ruler. Sukkadanta proposed Camadevi because she observed the Five Precepts. The two hermits then arranged for a delegation to travel to Lavo and invite her to rule Hariphunchai.

According to Lanna documents, Sukkadanta was also a teacher of Ram Khamhaeng of Sukhothai and Ngammueang of Phayao.

Sukkadanta has also been credited with the origin of Muay Lopburi, a regional form of Muay Thai.

== Interpretations of the name ==
The name Sukkadanta has several interpretations. Pensupha Sukkhata and Phongkasem Sonthithai suggest that the name may come from Skanda, also known as Kartikeya, a Hindu deity and son of Shiva. They connect this interpretation with Shaivism.

Folklorist Withun Buada gives another explanation. He suggests that the name comes from sakka and daṇḍa, referring to the punishment of Indra. He connects this interpretation with a story about Krishna and with Vaishnavism.

A third interpretation comes from Akkarin Phongphanpandecha, a researcher of Hariphunchai history. He suggests that the name comes from sukka and danta, meaning "white tooth". He suggests that the name may refer to people who did not chew betel, such as the Lawa.
