= Sudeva =

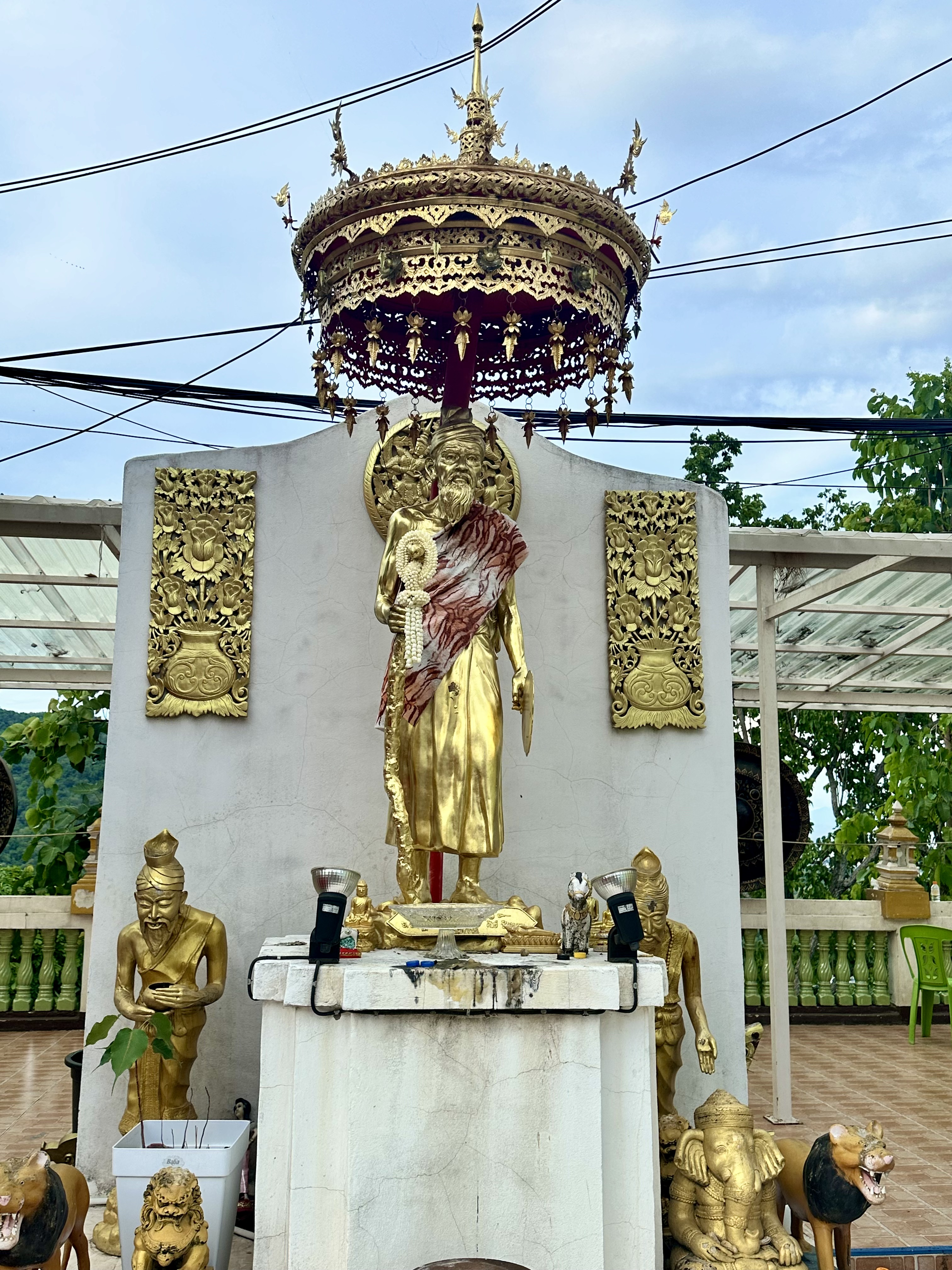
- Statue of Sudeva at Wat Phra That Doi Kham.
- Venerated in: Chiang Mai and Northern Thailand
- Affiliation: Northern Thai
- Abode: Doi Suthep

Sudeva (Thai: สุเทวะ), also known as Ruesi Vasuthep (Thai: ฤๅษีวาสุเทพ), is a legendary hermit in the founding traditions of Hariphunchai, an ancient Mon kingdom in present-day Lamphun province, Thailand. According to northern Thai legends, he helped establish Hariphunchai and invited Camadevi to become its first ruler. He lived on Doi Suthep, a mountain in Chiang Mai traditionally said to have been named after him.

== Legends ==
According to the Cāmadevivaṃsa (Chronicle of Camadevi) and other northern Thai traditions, Sudeva lived as a hermit on the mountain now known as Doi Suthep. He and another hermit, Sukkadanta, helped establish the city of Hariphunchai. The city was said to have been founded around the 7th century, although the dates in the legends are uncertain.

The legend says that Sudeva wanted a good ruler for the new city. He consulted Sukkhatanta, and the two hermits decided where to build it. They also sought help from Anusissa Ruesi, who sent a mythical Hatsadiling bird to place a shell over the chosen site. Sudeva and Sukkhatanta then created the city in the shape of the shell.

The hermits next looked for a ruler. Sukkhatanta told Sudeva about Princess Camadevi, the daughter of the ruler of the Lavo Kingdom (present-day Lopburi). She was said to observe the Five Precepts. The hermits decided to invite her to rule Hariphunchai and sent a delegation led by Kawayya Amat to Lavo.

Another part of the legend describes Camadevi as Sudeva's adopted daughter. According to this story, Sudeva found a baby girl inside a large lotus flower growing in a lake. He took her home, raised her and named her Camadevi. When she grew older, he decided that she should no longer live with him. He placed her on a raft and sent her downriver under the protection of divine beings. The raft reached Lavo, where the ruler took her into his palace. She later married the ruler's son.

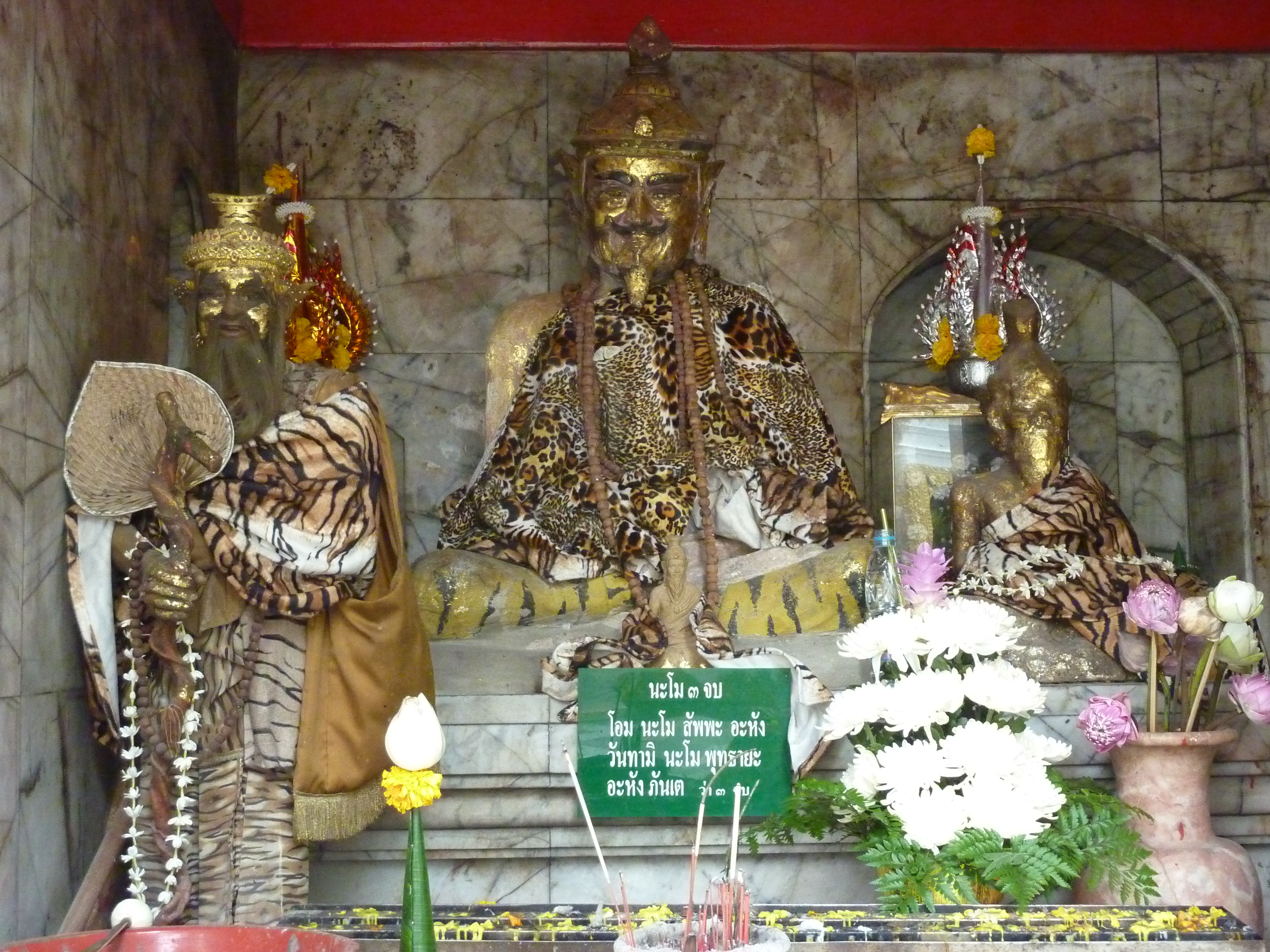
Statue of Sudeva at Wat Phra That Doi Suthep.

According to the founding legend, Camadevi accepted the invitation to rule Hariphunchai. She travelled north from Lavo with an entourage that included monks and other people who helped establish the new kingdom. The story also credits Sudeva with helping Camadevi establish Buddhism in Hariphunchai.

=== Parentage ===
Another legend identifies Sudeva as the son of Pu Sae and Ya Sae, two giants who lived near Doi Suthep. According to the story, Pu Sae, Ya Sae and their son encountered the Buddha and tried to eat him. The Buddha subdued them, and they agreed to follow his teachings. Their son wished to become a Buddhist monk, but the Buddha instructed him to become a hermit instead. He then became known as Sudeva Ruesi. This tradition also explains the name of Doi Suthep.

=== The five hermits ===
According to the Mulasasana (ตำนานมูลศาสนา), Sudeva, also called Vasudeva, was one of five men who became Buddhist monks during the lifetime of the Buddha. The other four were Sukkhatanta, Anusissa, Phutthachadila and Suphromma. They later left the monkhood because they found the monastic rules too difficult to follow. They became hermits in the Himavanta forest and practised asceticism until they gained supernatural powers.

The Chronicle of Camadevi gives a similar story but names the five hermits as Sudeva, Sukkhatanta, Anusissa, Jalita and Suphrom. It says that they were formerly Buddhist monks who later became hermits in the Himavanta forest, where they gained supernatural powers through their religious practice.

One day, the hermits wanted to eat food with sour and salty flavours. They therefore left the Himavanta forest and settled in different places. Sukkhatanta went to Lavo, Anusissa to Litawanli Nakhon, Phutthachadila to Doi Chuhabanphot, and Suphromma to Doi Khao Ngam in Mueang Nakhon. Sudeva settled on Doi Ucchubhanphata, now known as Doi Suthep.
