= Pu Sae and Ya Sae =

Northern Thai deities

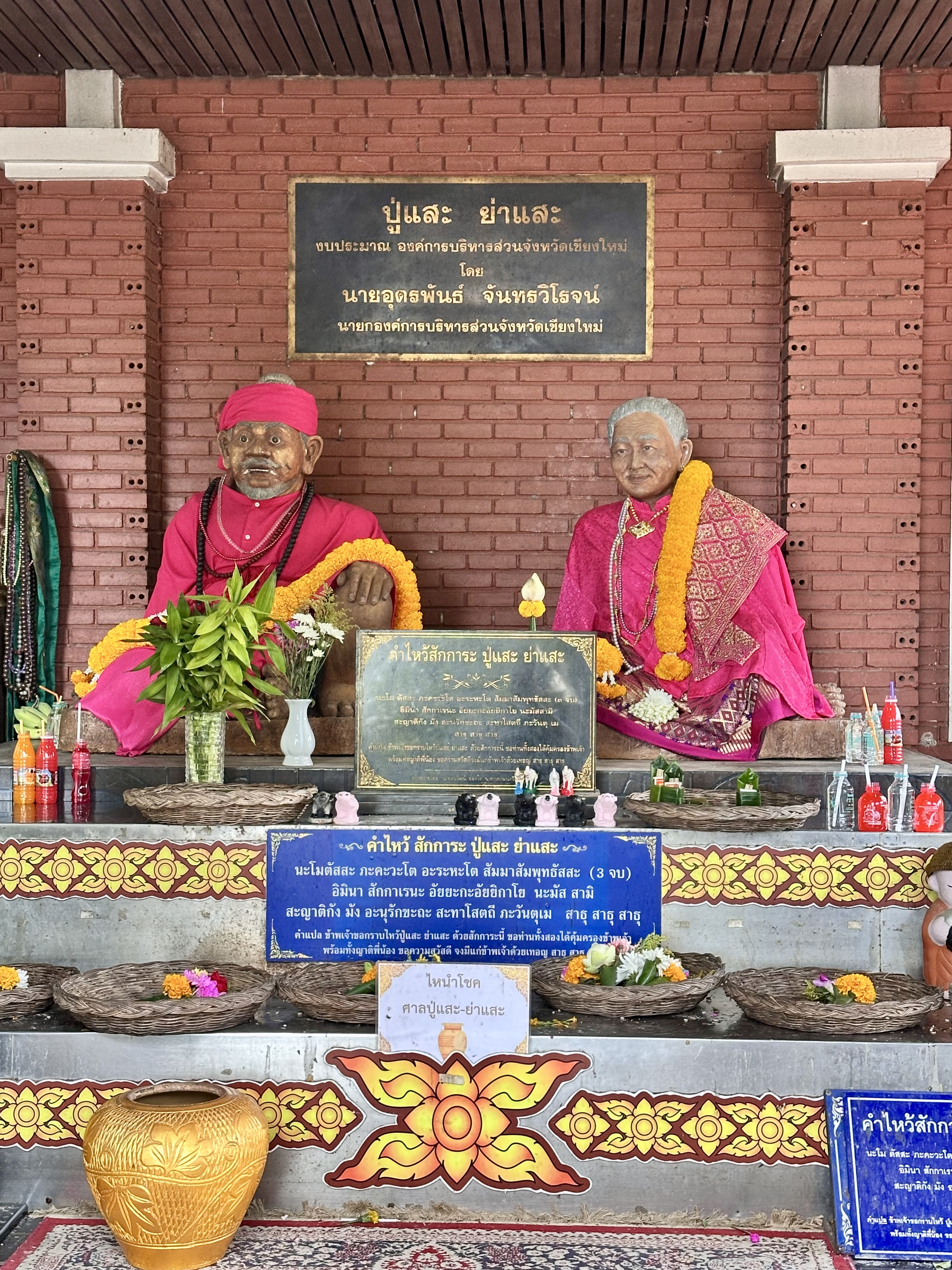
- Statues of Pu Sae and Ya Sae in their shrine at the foot of Doi Kham.
- Venerated in: Chiang Mai and Northern Thailand
- Affiliation: Northern Thai
- Abode: Foothill of Doi Kham

Genealogy
- Children: Sudeva

Pu Sae and Ya Sae (Northern Thai: ᨸ᩵ᩪᩯᩈᩡᨿ᩵ᩣᩯᩈᩡ; Thai: ปู่แสะย่าแสะ; lit. 'Grandfather Sae and Grandmother Sae') are a pair of ancestral spirits, often depicted as giants (Yaksha), who were venerated as the guardian spirits of the Chiang Mai valley and the Doi Suthep-Pui mountain range. Rooted in the pre-Buddhist animist beliefs of the indigenous Lawa (or Lua), their legend is a cornerstone of Lan Na folklore, telling a story of transformation from cannibalistic ogres to powerful protectors of the city and its watershed.

The veneration of Pu Sae and Ya Sae is most prominently expressed through an ancient and dramatic annual ritual known as "Pithi Liang Dong" (พิธีเลี้ยงดง), the "Feast of the Forest", which involves the sacrifice of a water buffalo to appease the spirits and ensure the region's prosperity and environmental stability.

== Legend ==
The legend of Pu Sae and Ya Sae appears in older texts such as the Tamnan Phuen Mueang Chiang Mai (The Chiang Mai Chronicle), the Tamnan Chiang Mai Pang Doem (Original Chiang Mai Chronicle), and the Dharma Tamnan of Wat Nantharam. It also appears in more recent texts, including the Legend of Phra That Doi Kham. The story is also preserved as an oral tradition, with versions that contain additional legendary details.

In these traditions, Pu Sae and Ya Sae are described as the Kao Phi (เก๊าผี), or the ancestors of the spirits of Chiang Mai. They are said to have had as many as 32 children. Their children include Chao Luang Kham Daeng, regarded as the highest-ranking spirit in Lanna; Chao Soi, who protects Mae Chaem; Chao Buarapha, who protects Haeng; and Chao Somphamitr, who protects the Mae Khanin forest, in present-day Hang Dong District.

According to local chronicles, Pu Sae and Ya Sae were cannibalistic giants who lived in the forests around Doi Suthep and Doi Kham with their son Sudeva. They were said to have attacked local inhabitants and eaten human flesh. In the Phrachaoliaplok legend, the Buddha encountered the three giants during his travels in the region. He subdued them and instructed them to follow the Five Precepts. Sudeva accepted the teachings and later became the hermit Sudeva Ruesi, after whom Doi Suthep is traditionally said to be named.

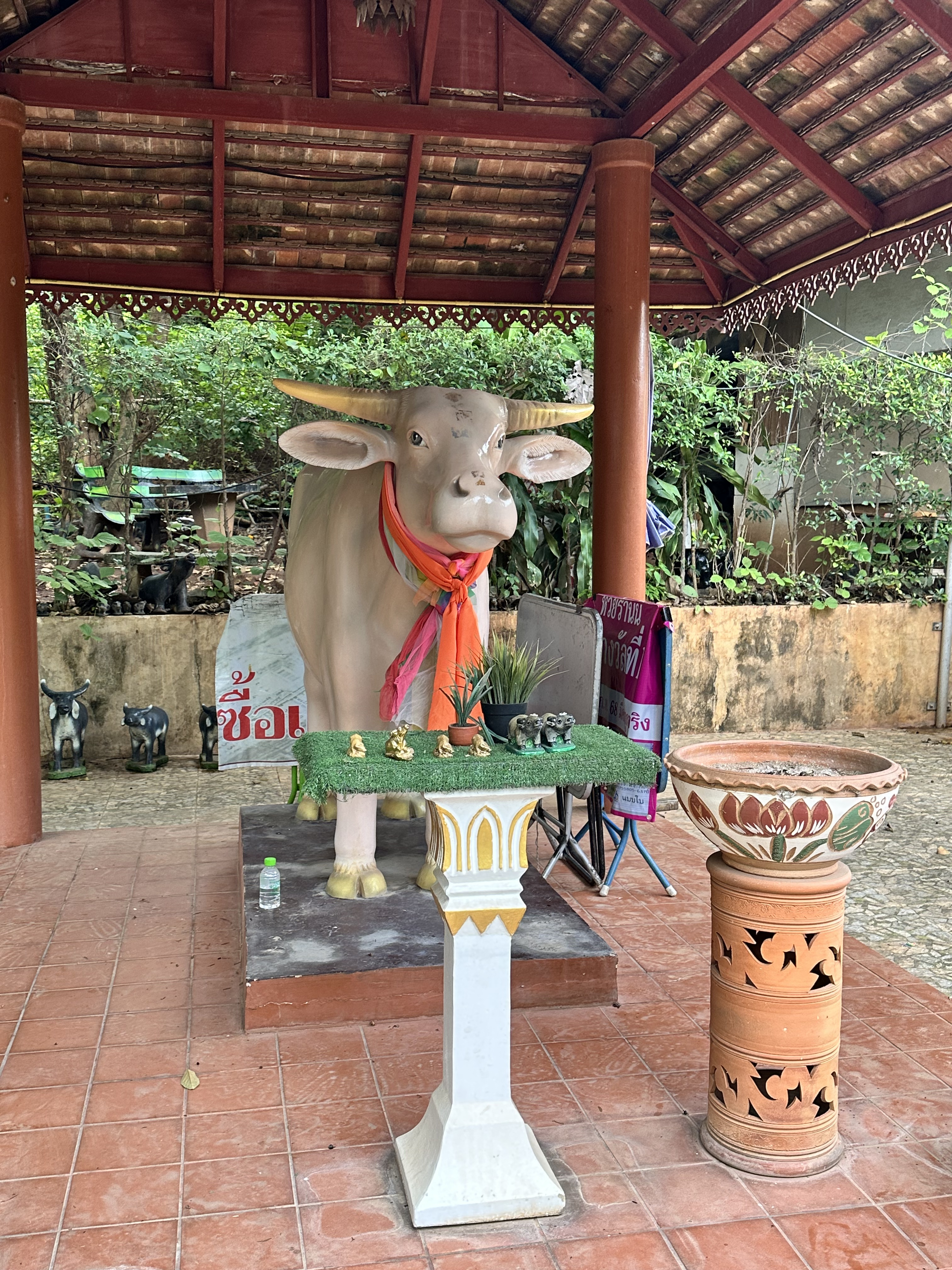
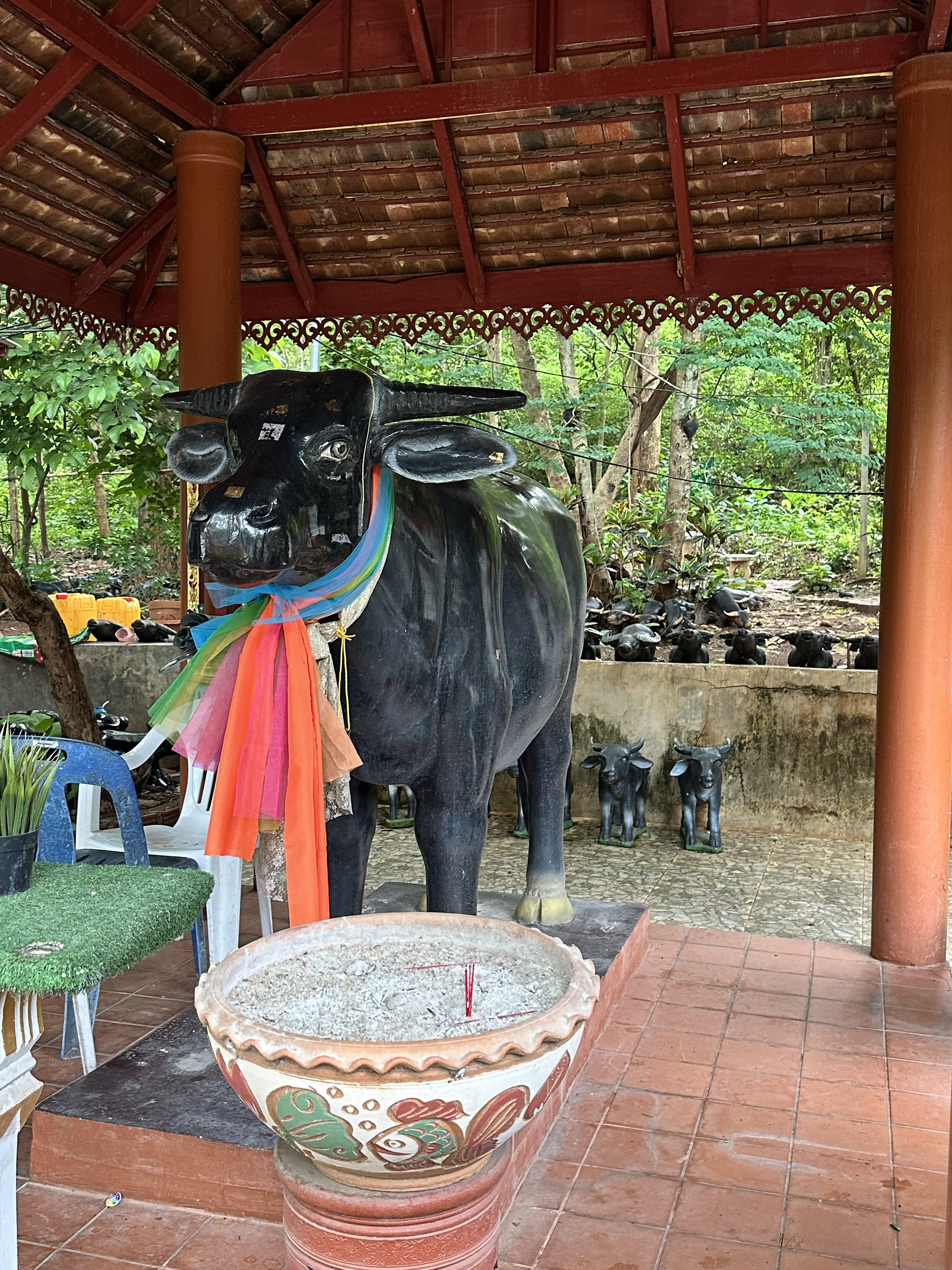
Left (A statue of white khao kham) Right (A statue of black khao kham)

According to the legend, Pu Sae and Ya Sae were unable to give up their desire to eat human flesh. They asked the Buddha for permission to eat it once a year, but he refused. They then asked for permission to eat animal flesh instead. The Buddha told them to consult the local ruler and left a hair relic, which was later enshrined at Wat Phra That Doi Kham. The city ruler eventually allowed them to eat a buffalo once a year.

This tradition is linked with the sacrifice of a young buffalo known as khwai khao kham (ควายเขาคำ), specifically one whose horns are no longer than its ears. The buffalo is offered to Pu Sae and Ya Sae on the 14th waxing moon day of the ninth month of the Northern Thai lunar calendar. In return, the two spirits are said to have promised to protect Chiang Mai, its inhabitants, and Buddhism for 5,000 years. After their deaths, they became guardian spirits, or arak. The annual offering is regarded as a continuation of the agreement between the spirits and the city.

== Liang Dong ceremony ==
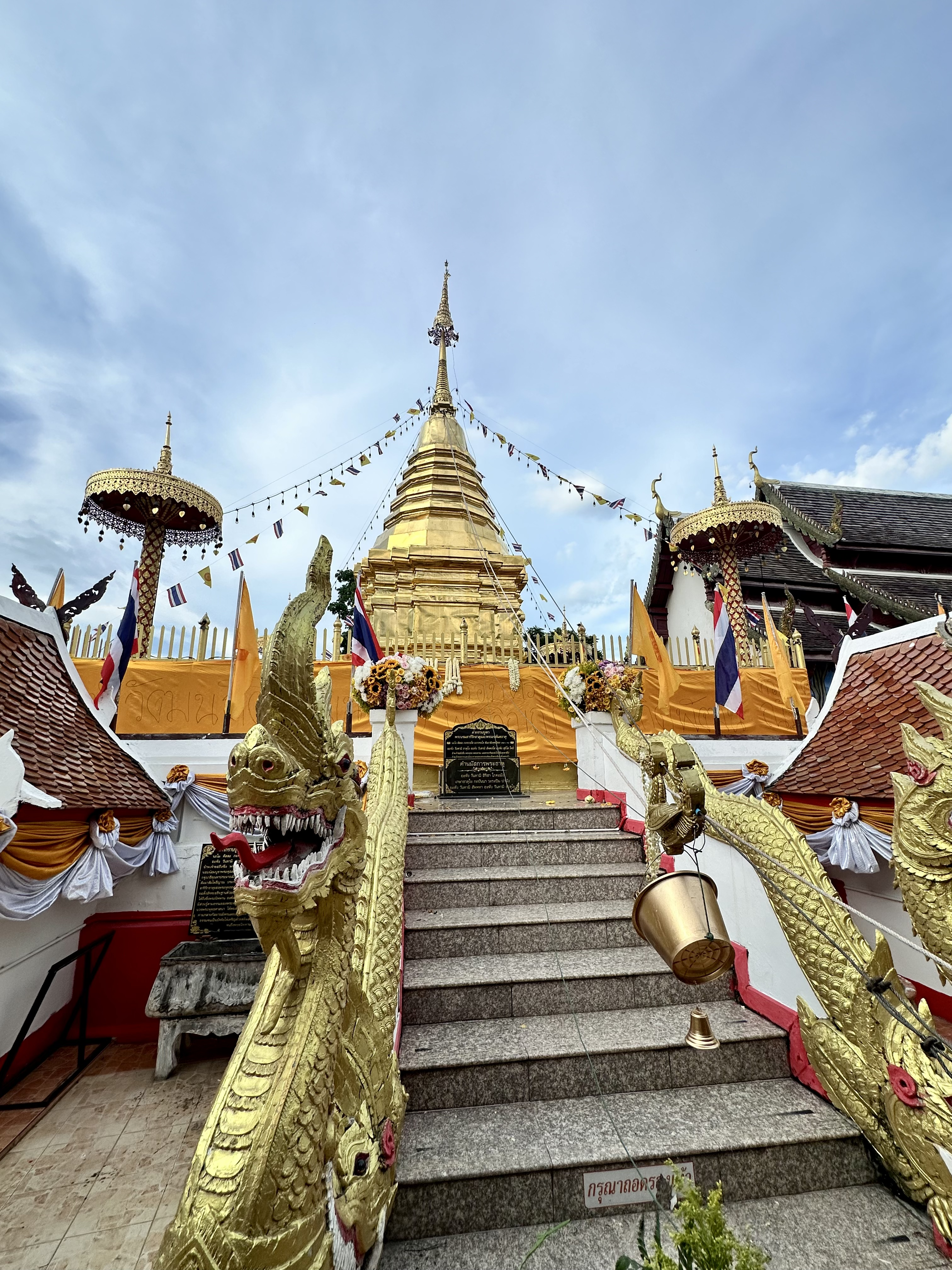
The 1,300-year-old Chedi at Doi Kham.

The Liang Dong Ceremony (พิธีเลียงดง) is an annual ritual rooted in ancient animist traditions that predate the introduction of Buddhism in northern Thailand. It is typically held around the full moon of the ninth month in the northern Thai lunar calendar, which usually falls in June. The ceremony marks the beginning of the rainy season and the rice cultivation cycle. It is conducted at a ceremonial ground located at the base of Doi Kham in the Mae Hia of Chiang Mai.

The central element of the ceremony is the offering of a black male water buffalo, which must meet specific criteria, such as having horns at least as long as its ears. The animal is ritually sacrificed in a traditional manner. A ma thiam (ม้าเที่ยม), or spirit medium, believed to be possessed by the spirit of Pu Sae, enters a trance-like state and consumes portions of the raw flesh and blood of the animal. This act symbolizes the spirit's acceptance of the offering.

The ritual is organised and attended by members of local communities, particularly descendants of the Lawa people and senior provincial officials, including the governor of Chiang Mai or their representatives, are often present. The purpose of the Liang Dong Ceremony is to propitiate the guardian spirits, requesting their protection over the forests of the Doi Suthep–Pui watershed, the provision of adequate rainfall for farming, and the safeguarding of the city from natural disasters.

Since 2023, the ceremony has attracted both cultural interest and controversy, particularly from animal rights activists. Nonetheless, it continues to be defended by local communities as an essential and unbroken tradition that maintains harmony between human society and the spiritual world.
