= Mulasasana =

Lanna Buddhist literary work

Mulasasanavaṃsa
- Author: Phra Phutthakam and Phra Phutthayan
- Original title: Mul Sasana Wangsa (Mul Sasana Vong)
- Translator: Sut Srisomwong; Phrom Khamala
- Language: Lanna
- Genre: Chronicle
- Publication place: Kingdom of Lanna
- Media type: Palm-leaf manuscript

Mulasasana (Thai: ตำนานมูลศาสนา), also known as Mulasasanavaṃsa (Thai: มูลสาสนาวังสะ), is a Lan Na Buddhist literature composed by Phra Phutthakam and Phra Phutthayan between 1456 and 1510 during the reigns of Tilokaraj and Kaew. It was written at Wat Suan Dok, and another version written at Wat Pa Daeng reflects the rivalry of the two sects in Lan Na.

The text consists of two parts: the first recounts the life of the Buddha, and the second concerns the history of Buddhism in Lanna. Its purpose was to link the Lanna royal lineage to that of the Buddha, praising King Tilokaraj both in worldly and religious terms. It is written in Northern Thai language prose using the Tai Tham script on palm-leaf manuscripts, and it spans 10 fascicles. The narrative often begins like a folktale, incorporating the views of contemporary scholars, Dharma teachings, local legends, and Jātaka stories. Events are summarised before details are given and concluded at the end. Examples include the enshrinement of the Buddha relics in Chiang Mai and the six boundary-marking (sīmā) ceremonies of Wat Suan Dok.

The original palm-leaf manuscripts bear the title Mulasasanavaṃsa. The name Tamnan Mulasasana was adopted when the Fine Arts Department of Thailand produced the first standard Thai translation in 1937. This edition was translated by Sut Srisomwong and Phrom Khamala, two senior scholars of the National Library's Literary Division.

== Versions ==
=== Palm-leaf manuscripts ===
Ten palm-leaf copies in Tai Tham script are preserved on microfilm at the Social Research Institute, Chiang Mai University:

- Wat Phuak Hong (Chiang Mai), inscribed 1813 CE (B.E. 2356) – Microfilm 87.019.01h.028-018
- Wat Sala Mo (Lampang), inscribed 1825 CE (B.E. 2368)
- Wat Tom Dong (Phayao), inscribed 1850 CE (B.E. 2393)
- Wat Chiang Man (Chiang Mai), inscribed 1874 CE (B.E. 2417)
- Wat Pha Daeng Luang (Lampang), inscribed 1919 CE (B.E. 2462)
- Wat Buak Khrok Luang (Chiang Mai), inscribed 1919 CE (B.E. 2462)
- Wat Nantararam (Chiang Mai), inscribed 1927 CE (B.E. 2470)
- Wat Lao Yao (Lamphun), inscribed 1928 CE (B.E. 2471)
- Wat Si Tia (Chiang Mai), inscribed 1974 CE (B.E. 2517)
- Chiang Man copy, Chiang Mai, undated

=== Printed editions ===
- Mul Sasana (Wat Suan Dok version), transl. Sut Srisomwong and Phrom Khamala (1949), Fine Arts Department
- Mul Sasana, Wat Pa Daeng, transl. Sommai Premchit (1976), Faculty of Sociology and Anthropology, Chiang Mai University
- Mul Sasana: Chiang Mai–Kengtung, transl. Prasert Na Nakhon and Puangkhum Tui Khieo (1994), Historical Society under royal patronage
- Mul Sasana: Jñānakamphi and the Great Jñānakamphi Legend, transl. Bamphen Rawin (1995b), Social Research Institute, Chiang Mai University
- Legend of Wat Pa Daeng, transl. Bamphen Rawin (1995c), Social Research Institute, Chiang Mai University
- Mul Sasana, Lanna Version, transl. Bamphen Rawin (1995a), Department of Thai, Faculty of Humanities, Chiang Mai University

== See also ==
- Jinakalamali
- Cāmadevivaṃsa
