= Jinakalamali =

Post-canonical Buddhist chronicle used in Theravadin countries

Jinakālamālī
- Author: Ratanapañña Thera
- Language: Pali
- Series: The Chiang Mai Chronicle, Burmese chronicles
- Genre: Chronicle, History
- Publication date: 1527 (claimed); 1788 (earliest extant copy in Khom)
- Publication place: Lan Na
- English publication date: 1968

Jinakālamālī (Thai: ชินกาลมาลีปกรณ์, RTGS: Chinnakanmalipakon; Burmese: ဇိနကာလမာလီ; lit. 'The Sheaf of Garlands of the Epochs of the Conqueror') is a Chiang Mai chronicle that covers mostly religious history and contains a section on early Lan Na kings to 1516/1517. Similar period Pali chronicles include the Cāmadevivaṃsa and the Mulasasana. Originally written in Pali by the abbot Ratanapañña Thera in the reign of Kaew of Lan Na, it may be argued that the book was written in 1516. As part of the literary renaissance under the Thai king Rama I, which included the collection and restoration of texts after the fall of Ayutthaya, a copy was made in 1788 of an original Ayutthaya manuscript. The chronicle was referenced by later Burmese chronicles, most notably Maha Yazawin, the standard chronicle of Toungoo Dynasty.

The oldest extant manuscript of 1788 is in Khom Thai script, "a variant of the Khmer script used in Thailand and Laos, which is used to write Pali, Sanskrit, Khmer, Thai and Lao (Isan)." From this version copies with some subsequent revisions were made. It was translated into English in 1968 by N.A. Jayawickrama.

Buddhism first arrived in the Lanna region (modern-day Northern Thailand) through a blend of early Indian trade routes, Mon heritage from the Haripunchai kingdom, and a deliberate cultural shift in the 14th century when kings adopted orthodox Sri Lankan Theravada Buddhism to unify their new empire.

The chronicle also touches upon the history of Myanmar, describing the conquests of King Anawrahta of the Pagan Dynasty. It is the first historical text of Southeast Asia to mention Anawrahta's conquest of a kingdom held by one King Manuha of Thaton Kingdom.

== Copies ==
The Jinakalamali has been copied and passed down through many editions. There are 11 editions found, 10 in Khmer script and 1 in Mon script.

- Edition 1 is the palm leaf manuscript that is assumed to be the oldest. Produced in the late Ayutthaya period, it is called the "original palm leaf", with bundles 1-2 and 4-5, but no bundle 3. It is currently kept at the National Library.
- Version 2, the "original teacher's version" palm leaf, was originally at the Phra Monthian Tham Hall in the Grand Palace. It is currently kept at the National Library.
- Version 3, the "golden version" palm leaf, is at the Phra Monthian Tham Hall.
- Version 4, the "rongsong version" palm leaf, is a copy of the "golden version", kept at the National Library.
- Versions 5-7, the "long-red version" palm leaf, the "royal water pouring version" (written during the reign of King Rama III), and the "thong noi version" (only bundle 3 remains) are at the Phra Monthian Tham Hall.
- Versions 8-10 are duplicate palm leaf versions, with serial numbers: Rod Nam Dam Tho Edition 2, Long Chad Edition 2 and Long Chad Edition 3
- Edition 11, the Mon Language Edition, is assumed to have been created in 2321 during the Thonburi period. Complete with volumes 1-6.

== Bibliography ==
- Aung-Thwin, Michael A. (2005). The Mists of Rāmañña: The Legend that was Lower Burma (illustrated ed.). Honolulu: University of Hawai'i Press. ISBN 9780824828868.
- Penth, Hans. (1994) Jinakalamali Index. Chiang Mai, Thailand: Silkworm Books, The Pali Text Society.
- Penth, H. (1983). "Which Ratana Panna Composed the Jinakalamali." Journal of the Siam Society, 71, 215-219. Siam Society Archive
- Buddhadatta, A. B. (1962). Jinakalamali. London: Pali Text Society (PTS).
- Jayawickrama, N.A. (trans.) (1968). The Sheaf of garlands of the epochs of the Conqueror. London: Pali Text Society (PTS).
