= Haripuñjaya =

Mon kingdom

Haripuñjaya/Hariphunchai ဟရိဘုဉ္ဇယ (Mon) ᩉᩁᩥᨷᩩᨬᨩᩮᨿ᩠ᨿ (Northern Thai) หริภุญชัย (Thai) Haripuñjaya (Pali)
- 629–1281
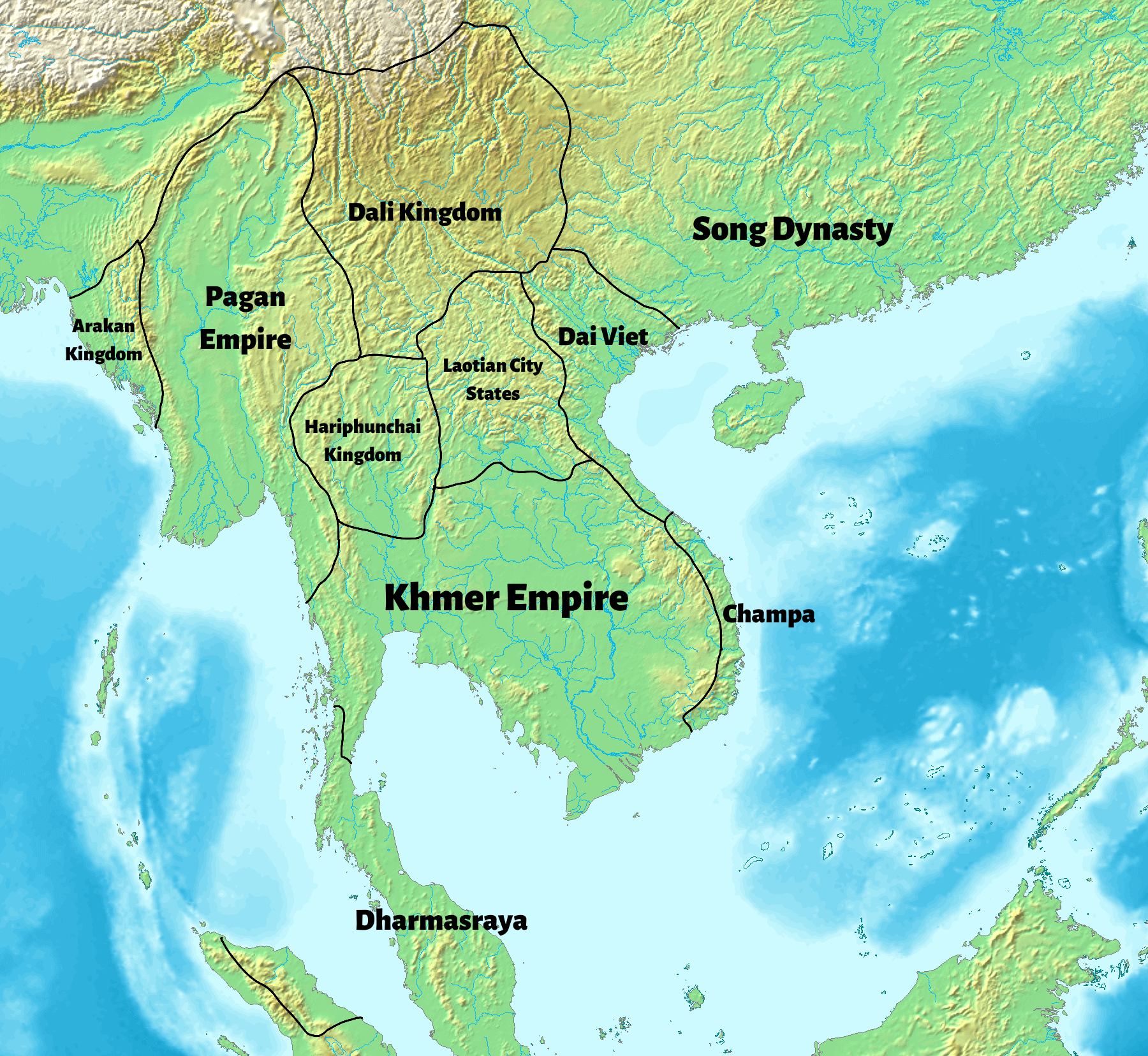
- Mainland Southeast Asia in 1100 CE
- Capital: Haripuñjaya (Lamphun)
- Common languages: Old Mon, Pali, Lawa, Northern Thai
- Religion: Buddhism (Theravada, Mahayana)
- Government: Mandala kingdom
- Monarch
  - 662–669, or 662–679, or 659–688: Camadevi (Jamadevi)
  - c. 1281: Yip (Yi Ba)
- Historical era: Post-classical
  - Legendary founding of Haripuñjaya by Suthep: 629
  - More probable founding of Haripuñjaya: 750
  - Besieged and captured by Ngoenyang: 1281
Preceded by	Succeeded by
Dvaravati; Lopburi	Ngoenyang

Haripuñjaya (Mon: ဟရိဘုဉ္ဇယ; Northern Thai: ᩉᩁᩥᨷᩩᨬᨩᩮᨿ᩠ᨿ; Thai: หริภุญชัย, RTGS: Hariphunchai), also spelled Haribhuñjaya, was an ancient Mon kingdom in what is now Northern Thailand, existing from the 7th or 8th to 13th century CE. Its capital was at Lamphun, which at the time was also called Haripuñjaya. In 1292 the city was besieged and captured by Mangrai of the Tai kingdom of Lan Na. The chronicle tradition credits the foundation to Camadevi, a princess invited from Lavo, and the kingdom's art and epigraphy are treated as part of the Dvaravati world of the Mon city-states. The date of that foundation is disputed, with proposals running from the seventh century to the twelfth.

Burial grounds and an iron-working site in the Lamphun basin are dated between the last centuries BCE and the sixth century CE, before the foundation the chronicles describe. In the twelfth century Adityaraja came into conflict with the rulers of Lavo. Seven large steles from Lamphun, among them the Mon inscription of 1219 from Vat Don, record donations, building works and an earthquake. Whether any Chinese record names the kingdom is disputed.

== History ==
=== Foundation ===
Material older than the foundation the chronicles describe has been dated in the same basin. Three burial grounds with grave goods give 500 BCE–100 CE at Yang Thong Tai, 138–618 CE at San Pa Kha and 478–578 CE at Wang Hai, and a site producing iron tools at Ban Hong gives 554–595 CE. Saiklang Jindasu, who reports them, states that the people who left this material are not definitely identified, and only that they were likely a group holding the lowland before the Dvaravati population arrived from Lavapura.

According to the Cāmadevivaṃsa, Jinakalamali and Singhanavati chronicles, the city was founded between 629–57 AD by four hermits named Sudeva, Sukatanata, Tapanana, and Chantasikatungka. Hermit Sukatanata requested the Mon ruler of the Lavo Kingdom (present-day Lopburi) to send his daughter, Jamadevi, to become the first queen of the city. Queen Jamadevi gave birth to twins, the older succeeding her as the ruler of Lamphun, and the younger becoming ruler of neighboring Lampang.

The local legend has it that at the beginning of her reign Haripuñjaya's Jamadevi defeated the Lawa dynasty's Khun Luang Wilangka, the 13th king of Raming Nakhon (ระมิงค์นคร, present Chiang Mai). Her two princes then married two princesses of King Vilanga, and the two houses became allies. The Lan Na chronicles as reported by Jindasu end the episode differently: Wilangkha, whom Haripuñjaya called Phaya Milakkha, was defeated and withdrew with his people to the hills.

=== Wars and conquest by Lan Na ===
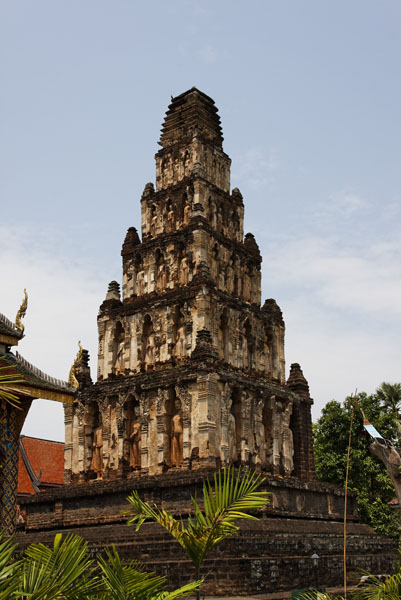
A Dvaravati-style square 'stepped pyramid' chedi, Wat Chamadevi

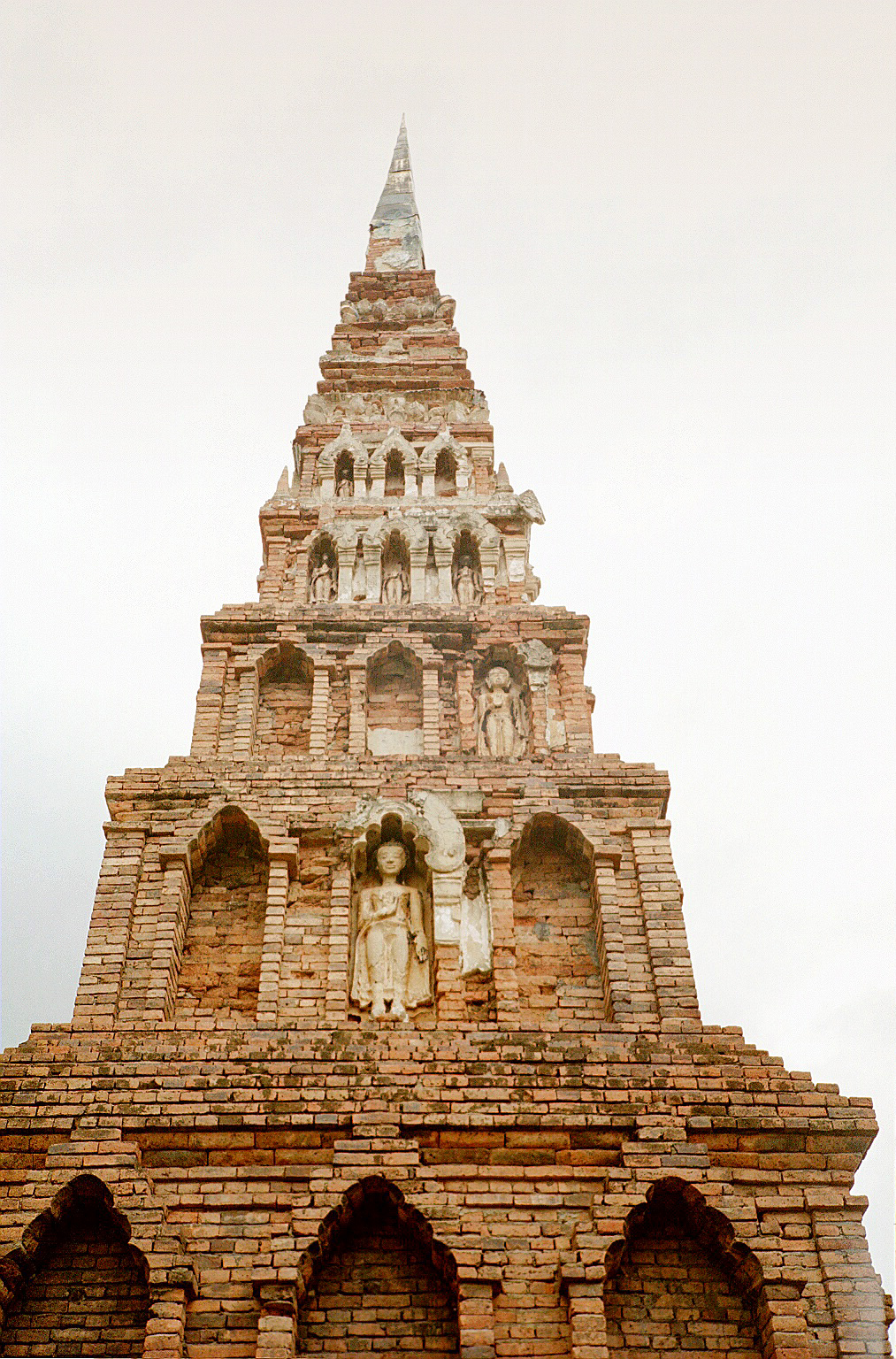
The Dvaravati-style chedi of Wat Phra That Hariphunchai

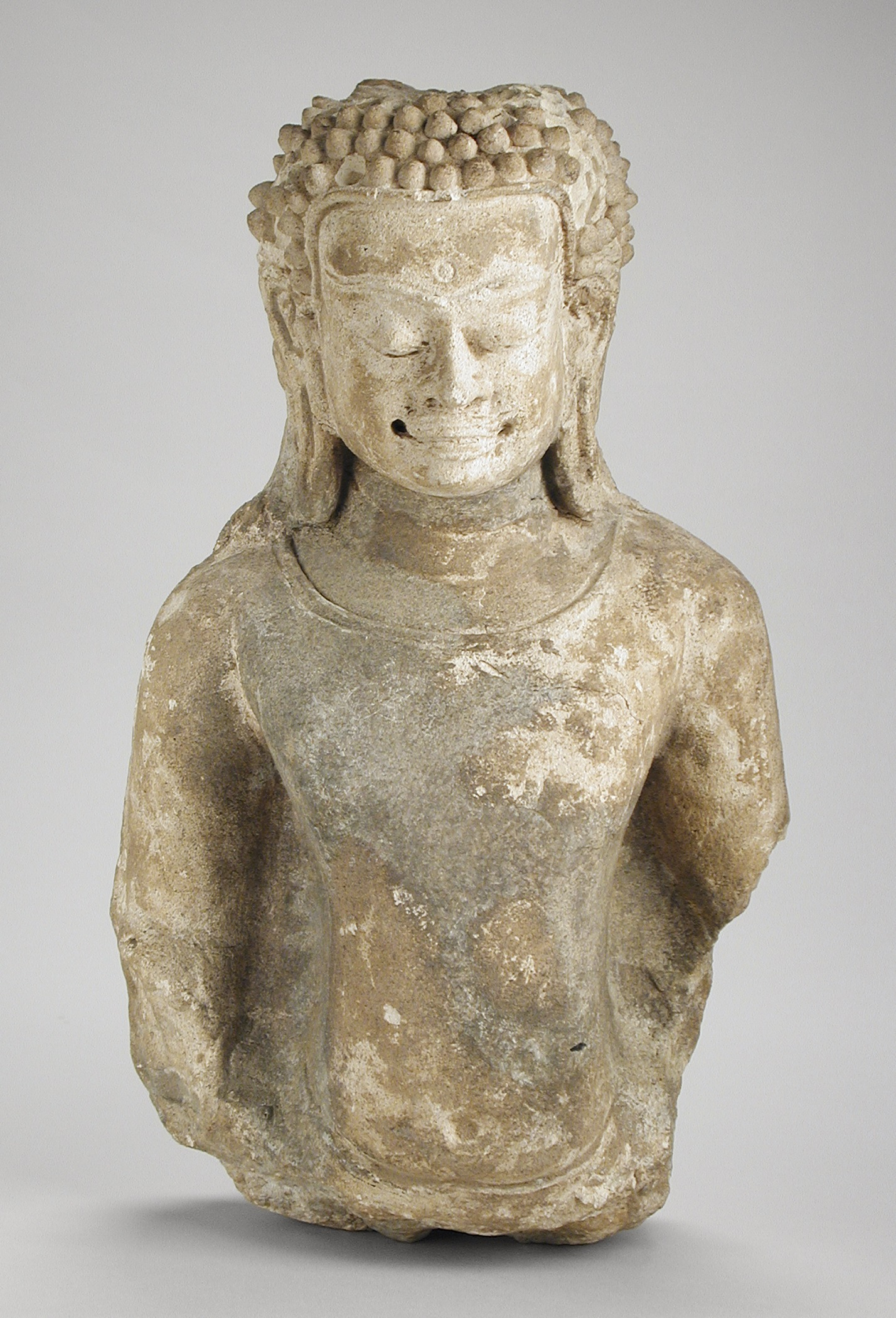
A Haripuñjaya statue of the Buddha Shakyamuni from the 12th–13th century CE

In the twelfth century Haripuñjaya was ruled by King Adityaraja. The Jinakalamali dates a stupa of his to 1063, which Woodward would place, probably, in the twelfth century. On Phra Borihan Thepthani's account, Adityaraja and his brother Chadachota (จันทรโชติ) had been princes of Suphannabhum and fled to Haripuñjaya after that kingdom was annexed by Lavo under Tambralinga's prince Kampoch. They then came into conflict with the Khmers who had taken over Lavo from Tambralinga in 1002. With an assist from Suphannabhum, Adityaraja annexed Lavo in 1052 and appointed his brother the king of Lavo. The Yonok Chronicle presents this as the end of Khmer influence in the Menam valley.

The chronicles say that Austroasiatic-speaking people, possibly Kuy people and/or Lawa people, from the northern polity of Umongasela (อุโมงคเสลา) in the present-day Fang unsuccessfully besieged Haripuñjaya several times during the 10th–11th century. In 957, due to such invasions, a Haripuñjaya noble named Aphai Kamini (อภัยคามินี) went south and refounded Sukhothai, which previously was abandoned around the 6th century. The Cāmadevivaṃsa has a second departure in the same period. It records that the people of Haripuñjaya fled a cholera epidemic to Sudhamma, that is Thaton in lower Myanmar, and that the city fell into decline and was abandoned. The king of Pagan restored Sudhamma for them, and they then moved on to Hamsavati, Bago, where they found the local language the same as their own. Moore and San Win note that the account leaves much unexplained and has been questioned because the surviving copies are late. What is generally agreed, they say, is only that the migration came from the Lamphun, Lampang and Phrae area.

For the early thirteenth century the chronicles record only religious and building activity, and no wars. In 1292 Haripuñjaya was besieged by the Tai Yuan king Mangrai, who incorporated it into his Lan Na ("One Million Rice Fields") kingdom. The plan set up by Mangrai to overpower Haripuñjaya began by dispatching Ai Fa (Thai: อ้ายฟ้า) on an espionage mission to create chaos in Haripuñjaya. Ai Fa managed to spread discontent among the population, which weakened Haripuñjaya and made it possible for Mangrai to take the kingdom over. Phraya Yi Ba, the last king of Haripuñjaya, was forced to flee south to Lampang. Hiram Woodward describes Haripuñjaya as the one place where a record of continuity survives, a line of late-Dvaravati Mon speakers passing into the Tai kingdom centred on Chiang Mai.

== Epigraphy ==
Haripuñjaya accounts for the third and last phase of Old Mon epigraphy in Thailand, of about the eleventh to thirteenth centuries and found nowhere else in the country. Unlike the brief donative texts of the earlier phases, the seven large steles from Lamphun are substantial documents. They record personal and place names, donations and building works, and an account of an earthquake and of the renovations that followed it. One records a ceremony at which palm-leaf manuscripts and an umbrella were interred in what may have been a man-made chamber.

Lamphun inscriptions from 1213, 1218, and 1219, mention King Sabbadhisiddhi endowing Buddhist monuments. The last of these is the Mon Vat Don inscription, LPh.01, which records that on Tuesday 28 May 1219 the king was briefly ordained a monk. His two sons attended, the teacher had reached the age of 82, and 80 monks and 102 novices resident in the temple, Jetavana, witnessed it. An uposatha hall for the rites of the monkhood had been built five years earlier. Wyatt reads the whole text as the king setting out his meritorious acts, and takes the ordination as a sign that Buddhism at Lamphun was by then thriving and closely tied to royal power. (Note: Wyatt notes that the date does not resolve cleanly. The weekday and the thirteenth day of the waxing moon of Jyestha work, but the Citra lunar mansion the inscription names fell three days earlier. Wyatt sets the peopling of the Ping valley apart from that of the Yom and the Nan: families moving down the Ping from Lampang and Lamphun came from country already Mon in culture, Theravada in religion and literate, where those coming down the other two rivers did not. Haripuñjaya also appears as one of the five regions into which the Annals of the North divide an Angkorian Siam, with Lavo, Suvarṇabhūmī, Śrī Dhammanagara and Chaliangraṭṭha.)

== Historiography ==
=== Chronicles and foundation date ===
The foundation dates the chronicles give are now considered too early, and the actual beginning is placed at around 750 AD. The chronicles themselves are late. Elizabeth Moore and San Win date the Cāmadevivaṃsa to between 1410 and 1417 and give its author as the monk Bodhiraṃsi, and Woodward places the Jinakalamali about a century after it. Woodward treats the four hermits as mythical figures, while allowing that hermits may have had a real part in the centuries of Indic contact, as successors to village shamans.

In the period the chronicles describe, most of what is now central Thailand was under the rule of various Mon city-states, known collectively as the Dvaravati kingdom. Sarasawadee Ongsakul reads the invitation of a princess from Lavo as the point at which the north passed from tribal community to complex society, the earliest such transition in the region. She divides the art of Haripuñjaya into a phase of the eighth to tenth centuries that resembles that of Dvaravati, and one of the eleventh to thirteenth that diverges from it under Burmese and Indian influence. Charles Higham and Rachanie Thosarat likewise argue for successive periods, dating Dvaravati-style ceramics at Lamphun to about 570 to 760 CE.

On the Jinakalamali Camadevi moved north in 662. If she was a more or less historical figure, Woodward holds, the move is likely to belong to the tenth century, after the Khmer empire had absorbed some of the old Dvaravati polities. Chris Baker and Pasuk Phongpaichit set the foundation later still. They note that one chronicle dates the migration from Lavo to 663, but hold that the archaeological evidence favours the 11th or 12th century. They place it within a general spread of settlement northward from the lower Chao Phraya plain towards the end of the first millennium.

=== Identifications and readings ===
On Donald Swearer's reading, reported by McCormick and Jenny, Lawa and Khmer speakers lived in the Lamphun area between the seventh and thirteenth centuries and may at times have ruled the kingdom. They add that Mon speakers may have been thinly but widely spread across the region in the first millennium. On their reading, Mon at Haripuñjaya may have been a language of literacy and elite culture rather than the speech of a large population.

A king of Haripuñjaya was for a time the favoured candidate for the donor of the Dong Mae Nang Mueang inscription of 1167 or 1168, found far to the south in what is now Nakhon Sawan province. George Cœdès proposed either Ādityarāja or his successor Dhammikarāja. His grounds were the Pali of the inscription's first face and the bilingual Mon and Pali epigraphy that would soon be cut at Lamphun. He added the tradition that Ādityarāja had enshrined at Lamphun a relic of the Buddha first worshipped by Aśoka. He withdrew the proposal in a footnote added while his article was in press, on evidence that Lopburi had sent its own mission to China in 1155, and in 1968 stated a preference for Lopburi. Walailak Songsiri reads the inscription differently again. The merit-making it records is made to Kamrateng Jagat Sri Dharmasokaraja. She takes that as a prestigious royal name borrowed from the peninsula rather than the name of the donor's own king, and compares the use of Sri Maharaja, a Srivijayan royal style, as the place-name Phraek Si Racha.

Songsiri gives Haripuñjaya a part in the history of the word Mon itself. The earliest attested Old Mon form rmeñ occurs in an inscription of Kyansittha of Pagan dated 1102. She holds that the Middle Mon rman was probably taken from a Pali word by way of Haripuñjaya, nearly a century after the reign of Suryavarman I. The argument is chronological and is directed against reading Rāmanya in the Khmer inscription K.1198 as the Mon of Lavo; it does not itself say what Rāmanya meant.

G. H. Luce read the Chinese term K'un-lun as referring to the kingdom. (Note: Kunlun was a general Chinese term for the peoples of the South Seas rather than a name for any one polity; the Cefu Yuangui applies it to Dvaravati.) Tatsuo Hoshino names no Chinese notice of Haripuñjaya itself, and the connection he proposes is indirect. He identifies the Qian Tuo Huan that fought Chenla in the New Book of Tang with pre-Khmer Lopburi, and notes that many wars between Chenla and Lopburi are recorded for the Tang period. He suggests that some of them may be the conflicts between Lopburi and Haripuñjaya described in the Cāmadevivaṃsa, the Jinakalamali and the Munlasatsana.

== List of rulers ==
Names of monarchs of the Haripuñjaya kingdom according to Jinakalamalipakorn:

1. Camadevi (662–669)
2. Mahayos (669–749), son of the previous
3. Kumañ (749–789), son of the previous.
4. Ruthanta (789–816), son of the previous.
5. Sonamañchusaka (816–846)
6. Samsara (846–856), son of the previous.
7. Paduma (856–886)
8. Kuladeva (886–894)
9. Maharaj (conquer Haripuñjaya)
10. Lakkhunsriya (Milakkha conqueror of Haripuñjaya)
11. Kuladeva (2nd reign)
12. Nok
13. Dala
14. Gutta
15. Sela
16. Yuva
17. Brahmata
18. Mukasa
19. Traphaka (924–927)
20. Uchitta jakraphad, King of Lavo (927–930)
21. Kampol (930–951)
22. Jakraphad, King of Atikuyaburi or Jinghong (951–960)
23. Vasudev
24. Ñeyyala
25. Maharaja, King of Lampang
26. Sela
27. Kañjana
28. Chilankanam
29. Phanthula
30. Inthavara
31. Ditta
32. Adhijja (1039-1119)
33. Thammikaraj
34. Ratha
35. Sapphasith
36. Chettharaj
37. Jeyakaraj
38. Datvañña
39. Ganga
40. Siripunya
41. Uthen
42. Phantoñña
43. Thayya ammat (Ammat of Phantoñña, coup the throne from Lampang)
44. Atana
45. Hvam
46. Trangal (1195–1196)
47. Ñotta (1196–1270)
48. Ñiba (1270–1292)
