= Cāmadevivaṃsa =

Semi-historical chronicle of Queen Cāmadevi lineage

The Camadevivamsa (Thai: ตำนานจามเทวีวงศ์, Thai pronunciation: [tamnaːn t͡ɕaːm tʰeːwiː woŋ], literally, "Chronicle of the Lineage of Cāmadevi") is a Pali chronicle composed in the early 15th century by the Lanna Buddhist monk Mahathera Bodhiramsi (Thai: พระโพธิรังษีมหาเถระ). The chronicle, dated to c. 1410, is a semi-historical recounting of the founding of the Mon Dvaravati kingdom of Hariphunchai (Haripunjaya) in the mid-sixth century by Queen Cāmadevi and her establishment of a lineage destined to rule Haripunchai for the next 500 years. The manuscript ends with King Adittaraja's discovery of a sacred relic of the Buddha in the eleventh century that became central to the Theravada Buddhist culture of Haripunchai and is still enshrined in Wat Phradhatu Haripunjaya (Wat Phra That Hariphunchai) in present-day Lamphun, Thailand. In addition to the Camadevivamsa, which is also known in English as The Legend of Queen Cama and The Chamadevivongs, Bodhiramsi also composed, in 1417, the Tamnan Phraphutthasihing, another chronicle which describes the history of the Phra Phuttha Sihing image, from its creation in Ceylon (Sri Lanka) to its enshrinement in 1411 at Chiang Mai, the capital of Lanna.

== Historical background ==
Haripunchai was a kingdom affiliated with Dvaravati, a Theravada Buddhist culture that existed in a loose confederacy of Mon-ruled principalities in the area of present-day Thailand from the sixth to thirteenth centuries. Known as a center of scholarship and Theravada study at a time when other kingdoms in the area were still practicing a form of Hinduism, Dvaravati played a major role in diffusing Buddhism and Indian culture to the rest of Southeast Asia. The southern portion of Dvaravati came under increasing influence from the growing Khmer Empire culminating in an invasion by Suryavarman II in the early twelfth century. Haripunjaya remained independent and flourished until defeated in 1281 or 1292 by Mangrai, leader of the fledgling Tai city states in what is now northern Laos. Mangrai united the city states and, incorporating conquered Haripunjaya, founded the kingdom of Lanna.

Lanna embraced and adopted the Indianized Buddhist culture of Haripunjaya, continuing the tradition of scholarship and spreading the Theravada religion to the Tai peoples. It was in this context that Bodhiramsi wrote the Camadevivamsa.

== Text ==
The Camadevivamsa is a palm leaf manuscript written in the Tai Tham script and is housed at a monastery in Northern Thailand. The first, and only, edition of the complete Pali text was published, in Thai script with a side-by-side Thai translation, in 1920 and is currently located in the Wachirayan Library in Bangkok. Five years later, George Cœdès published a commentary on some of the Northern Thai Chronicles in which he included a French translation of chapters 12, 13 and part of 14. A Thai translation was printed in 1967 by the Fine Arts Department and the Social Research Institute of Chiang Mai University holds a microfilm copy of the original palm leaf manuscript. A full English translation and commentary, which, in contrast to previous analyses, treats the Camadevivamsa as a religious "mythic-legendary (narrative) in which etiology, cosmology and Buddhist doctrine take precedence over historical facts", was published in 1998 by Donald Swearer.

Early study of the Northern Thai Chronicles by Western scholars was focused on searching for factual and historical details within the texts to compare and contrast with those of other documents and inscriptions. Little attention was given to the cultural implications such as religious, mythological or legendary significance. For example, George Cœdès criticized the Camadevivamsa for its lack of verifiable historical facts. However, modern scholarship recognizes the text as a 15th-century religio-cultural work written primarily as a foundation myth for the ancient Mon Hariphunchai to establish its connection and cultural continuity with the Thai city of Lamphun in the Lanna kingdom, as well as to substantiate the legendary visit of the Buddha to the region and legitimize both the Buddha relic and the temple in which it is housed.

== Narrative structure ==
The Camadevivamsa displays elements of both a Jataka and tamnan, or Thai chronicle of the development of Buddhism in relation to Thai history. The narrative opens with the story of the Buddha's past visit to Haripunchai and relates his prophecy that a relic will be found there centuries later by King Adittaraja, an event which occurs in the final chapter, framing the narrative in a manner similar to that of a Jataka, in which the final chapter serves a literary device connecting past and present.

The second chapter also recounts a legend from the distant past, telling of an ascetic sage (rishi) named Vasudeva. Jamadevi, a pregnant Mon princess of the Lavo Kingdom, with Vasudeva's help, "create order out of chaos" and "build a walled, moated city ... out of the jungle ... and bring civilization" to the indigenous people called Millakkha, which is believed to refer to the Lawa, the animist Mon-Khmer people who inhabited the region north of Lavo before the arrival of the Mon.

Chapter three tells of the building of Haripuchai and in chapter four, Jamadevi is consecrated as its Queen. Following this, chapters five and six for a synopsis of events recorded in another Northern Thai chronicle, the Jinakalamalipakarnam. Chapter seven recounts the battles between Jamadevi's new city and the surrounding Lawa people, which culminates in a victory for Haripunchai. In the following chapter, Jamadevi arranges for her two sons to marry the two daughters of the defeated Lawa chief, bringing all of the surrounding peoples under the subjugation of Haripunchai.

Chapters nine, ten and eleven tell of Jamadevi's expansion of Haripunchai and her expeditions to the reaches of her realm, including the new cities which she founded. In chapter eleven is also found the story of her death.

Chapter twelve chronicles the long line of royal succession of the Jamadevi dynasty which culminates with Adittaraja, whose reign is recorded in chapter 13. The remainder of chapter 13 and the following chapter tell of Adittaraja's war with Haripunchai's sister kingdom to the south, the Mon Lavo, and his eventual victory. The chronicle ends with Adittaraja's discovery of the Buddha relic in chapter 15.

== Modern folk veneration ==
Popular folk veneration of Jamadevi has seen a resurgence in the modern era, especially in the Northern region of Thailand. A memorial statue was built in Lamphun that has become a devotional center for worshipers. Nationwide media coverage was given to a former television personality who claims to be possessed by the spirit of Jamadevi and people across Thailand seek Jamadevi's blessing on things as mundane as picking lottery numbers.
