= Camadevi =

Camadevi: စာမ္မာဒေဝဳ; จามเทวี
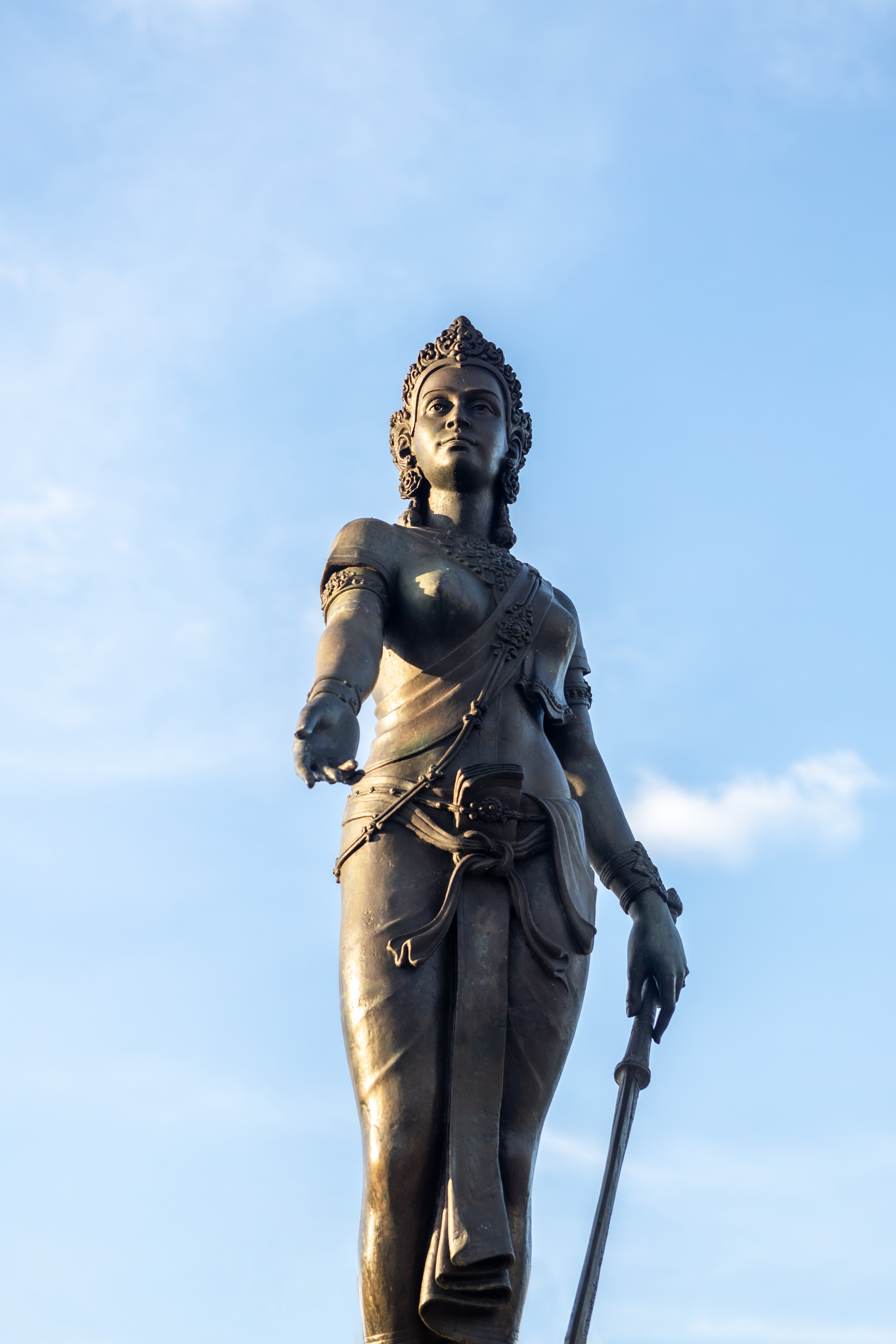
- Queen Camadevi's Monument in Lamphun

Queen of Haripuñjaya
- Reign: 662–669 (7 years), or 662–679 (17 years), or 659–688 (29 years)
- Predecessor: Tripop
- Successor: Hanayos
- Born: 623 or 633; Lavo Kingdom
- Died: 715 (age 91–92), or 731 (age 97–98); Haripuñjaya Kingdom
- Spouse: Phraya Kanwandis, or Prince Ramrat
- Issue: Mahantayot; Anantayot
- Dynasty: Camadevi
- Father: Chakkrawat (King Chakkrawadiraj), or Inta, Nong Duu villager

Camadevi (also spelt Jamadevi, [tʃaːmaˈdeːʋiː]; Pali: Cāmadevī; Thai: จามเทวี, RTGS: Chammathewi; Mon: စာမ္မာဒေဝဳ, IPA: [t͡ɕaːm.má.tʰeː.wiː]; 7th-century – 8th-century) was the first monarch and queen of Haripuñjaya, which was an ancient Mon kingdom in present-day Northern Thailand before it was conquered by the Kingdom of Lan Na.

Most records of Camadevi mention her life period differently. For example: Chinnakanmalipakon said that she reigned in 662 for 7 years; Manit Wallipodom's research mentioned that she was born in 623, reigned in 662 for 17 years and died in 715 at the age of 92; and the legend of Camadevi, translated and edited by Suttavari Suwannapat, mentioned that she was born in 633, reigned from 659 up to 688 and died in 731.

== Early life ==
As written in the Legend of Cāmadevivaṃsa, it was recorded that she was a scion of the ruler of the Lavo Kingdom. But according to the mythology, people believe she was a daughter of a wealthy man named Inta, who lived in the Nong Duu village, which is in the Pa Sang district of Lamphun at the present time. When she turned 3 months old, she was grabbed and taken away by a giant bird. The bird flew over Doi Suthep and gave the young baby to a hermit named Sudeva. He took good care of her and named her Vi.

Vi grew up well-educated with Suthewa Rusi. As Vi turned 13 years old, he prophesied her destiny and found out that she had a chance to be the ruler of a great kingdom in the future. He built a raft and sent her away to Lavo because it was the most prosperous kingdom at that time. It took months for the raft to reach the Lavo Kingdom. As the raft reached the kingdom, people were very amazed by the incident. The King and the Queen were very pleased about the girl's arrival. They kept her and gave her a new name, which was Camadevi.

Camadevi grew up and lived comfortably in the royal court of the Lavo Kingdom. After the ruler and his wife were informed by the fortune-teller that this girl had glory to become the powerful ruler of a great kingdom and would also marry a great man, they raised Camadevi's position to be the Princess of Lavo and arranged a coronation for her when she was 14 years old.

== Marriage ==
A marriage was arranged for Camadevi as she turned 20. She was supposed to marry Ramrat, a prince from the neighbouring kingdom, Ramburi. As she was well known for her beauty, Khun Luang Wilangka, the ruler of the Lawa people, asked the King of Lavo for permission to marry her but was rejected. He felt enraged and decided to start a war with the Lavo Kingdom to win Camadevi.

Camadevi chose to lead the army herself. She gained allies from neighboring kingdoms and could win the army. Her victory was admired and celebrated by the people but Camadevi was sorrowful about all the lives lost in this war, so she gave an order to build a temple on the battleground devoted to the deceased.

According to the Legend of Cāmadevivaṃsa, the war took place in 653. After the situation was settled, the marriage was arranged 2 years later.

== Ruling Haripuñjaya ==
Around 659, Sudeva Ruesi came to Lavo to ask Camadevi to take over the new kingdom, Haripuñjaya, which he and his friend had established. However, the story was recorded differently in the Legend of Cāmadevivaṃsa. It was written that Prince Ramrat was ordained at that time. Since her husband was not with her, the invitation was sent from Haripuñjaya, asking her to be in charge. According to the mythology, she accepted the offer because the citizens were in trouble and that the city needed a leader. She also wanted to repay Suthewa Rusi for his kindness for raising her when she was young.

It took her 7 months to reach Haripuñjaya by boat. After arriving, Camadevi was crowned to be the ruler of the Haripuñjaya. She was already pregnant before leaving Lavo and gave birth to 2 sons 7 days after the coronation. Her first son was named Mahantayot and her second son Anantayot.

== Death ==
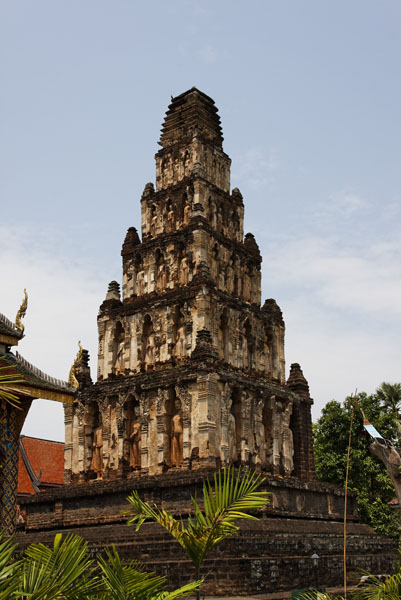
Suwan-Chang-Kot-Chedi at Wat Camadevi in Lamphun. It is believed that her bones are contained here.

Camadevi reigned until 688 before Hanayos took over. She left her role in the government and changed to preserve Buddhism instead when she turned 60. She died in 731 when she was 89 years old.

After her death, Hanayos arranged a funeral for her for 7 days. Her bones were collected and contained in the Suwan-Chang-Kot-Chedi at Wat Camadevi in Lamphun after the cremation.

== Monument ==
Camadevi's statue is located in Naimueang Sub-district, Lamphun province. It is situated about 1 km from the city hall near the Nongdork public garden. The opening ceremony of the monument took place on October 2, 1982, and was inaugurated by Vajiralongkorn.

Camadevi House of Camadevi Born: ? Died: ?
Regnal titles
Preceded by Triphop	Queen of Haripuñjaya; 662–669	Succeeded by Mahantayot
