= Lawa people =

Ethnic group of northern Thailand

Lawa
Total population
- 17,000 (est.)

Regions with significant populations
- Thailand

Languages
- Lawa, others

Religion
- Animism, Buddhism

Lawa (Thai: ลัวะ or ละว้า; RTGS: Lawa) are an ethnic group in northern Thailand. The Lawa language is related to the Blang and the Wa language found in China and Burma, and belongs to the Palaungic languages, a branch of the Austroasiatic languages. Their population is estimated to be some 17,000. The Western Lawa are found in the vicinity of Mae Sariang in the south of Mae Hong Son Province, the Eastern Lawa are centred on Bo Luang in Chiang Mai Province.

== Overview ==
The Lawa are sometimes mistaken for being the same people as the Lua of northern Laos and of Nan Province, Thailand, who are speakers of the more distantly related Khmuic languages. This problem is compounded by the Eastern Lawa of Chiang Mai Province preferring to be called Lua by outsiders, and by the Thai people generally referring to speakers of these different Palaungic languages as Lua.

Today, those Lawa who have not been integrated in mainstream Thai society, still live a traditional way of life, often professing animism. As with the other mountain ethnic groups of Thailand, they are known for extraordinary craft skills, especially for being ironsmiths.

== History ==
Sources place the Lawa as the original inhabitants of Northern Thailand, pre-dating the Tai migration into these lands. There is evidence that the Lawa inhabited cities before the arrival of the Tai peoples. Chiang Mai, Thailand, was founded on the location of a 5th-century CE Lawa walled city, and legends state that Kengtung in Myanmar was taken from the Lawa in the 13th century CE through cunning and deceit by King Mangrai, the founder of the northern Thai Lanna Kingdom.

Some writers have theorized that at one point the Lawa may have inhabited lands in Central Thailand as far down as Lopburi (Lavapura) based on the similarity between the names Lavapura and Lawa. This is unlikely, however, as there is no evidence that the Lawa lived further south than the middle of the Ping River valley, and archeological evidence only suggests that Mon speakers lived in this area.

=== The Lawa in northern Thai legends ===
The Lawa people are mentioned in northern Thai legends, mainly in connection with the founding of its cities. The 15th century CE book Cāmadevivaṃsa by the Chiang Mai monk Bodhiramsi, relates how the Mon Queen Camadevi, a princess of the Lavo Kingdom, established the city of Haripunchai (present-day Lamphun) in the 7th century CE and is attacked by Vilanga, king of the Lawa, with 80,000 soldiers. After his defeat, she marries her two sons to the two daughters of the Lawa king, after which the two kingdoms become allies.

The founding of the city state of Ngoenyang in the 7th century CE, of which Mangrai was a prince before establishing the Lanna Kingdom in the 13th century, is also attributed to the Lawa in the Doi Tung story.

== See also ==
- Lavo Kingdom
- Wa people
