= Qian Zhi Fu =

Ancient kingdom in central Thailand

Qiān Zhī Fú
- 5th century – 980s
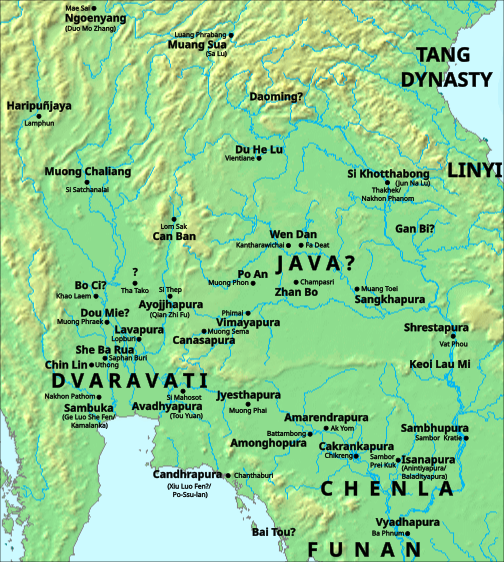
- Proposed locations of ancient kingdoms in Menam and Mekong Valleys in the 7th century based on the details provided in the Chinese leishu, Cefu Yuangui, and others.
- Capital: Ayojjhapura (400s–700s; 800s–980s); Sambuka (700s–800s; as Kolo Kingdom)
- Government: Kingdom
  - 5th-c.: Chakravantin
  - 5th-c.: Prathivindravarman
  - ?–550: Bhavavarman
  - c. 662: Ramaraja
  - 859–?: Bhagadatta
  - 937–971: Narapatisimhavarman
- Historical era: Post-classical era
  - Formation: 400s
  - First tribute to China: 650s (Note: Hoshino places the mission in 657, within the Xian Qing reign of 656–661, and has Qiān Zhī Fú travelling as one of five states led by Zhān Bó rather than on its own account.)
  - Seized by Angkor: 946
  - Disestablished: 980s
  - Formation of Xiān's Ayodhya: 1080s
Succeeded by
Angkor
Kolo
Lavo
Siam Confederation
- Today part of: Thailand

Qiān Zhī Fú (Chinese: 千支弗) or Bàn Zhī Bá (半支跋), or Gàn Zhī Fú (干支弗), was a polity recorded in the Chinese sources of the Tang period. It is placed in the Southwest Sea region (西南海), but its identification and location remain disputed. Tatsuo Hoshino places it at Si Thep in the Pasak Basin of central Thailand, while earlier scholarship, notably Paul Pelliot, proposed an identification with Kancipura in southern India. Hoshino further interprets Qiān Zhī Fú as one of the early Siamese polities of the trans-Mekong network and considers its connections with other inland states in the region to have been based partly on overland trade.

By the mid-seventh century, Qiān Zhī Fú was recorded as an independent polity maintaining tributary relations with the Tang dynasty. In 657, it joined four other polities in a tribute mission to the Tang court under the leadership of Zhān Bó, and the envoys brought elephants and rhinoceroses. Hoshino places Qiān Zhī Fú within a network of polities extending across the middle Mekong and connecting the Menam basin with the South China Sea.

The later history of the polity and its relationship with other centres in central and northeastern Thailand are less certain. Various scholars have proposed connections between the political centres identified with Qiān Zhī Fú, Dvaravati, Wen Dan, Lavo and other regional polities, but these reconstructions are not directly established by the Chinese records. In particular, the identification of Qiān Zhī Fú with Si Thep remains a hypothesis rather than a settled identification.

== Identification and localization ==
The location of Qiān Zhī Fú and the identification of the names recorded for it remain uncertain. The notice stands in the Nan Man (南蠻), or "southern barbarians", chapter of the New Book of Tang, whose sequence runs through Huan Wang, Pan Pan, Funan, Zhenla and Dvaravati. Hoshino reads the Southwest Sea of that chapter as denoting not a sea but the part of mainland Southeast Asia lying south of the Red River basin and Nanzhao, distinguished from the Nan Hai of the middle Mekong. The notice describes Qiān Zhī Fú as a settlement of people from southern India and gives it the alternative name Bàn Zhī Bá, which Hoshino renders "Five Hills". The same passage describes the northern neighbour Duō Mó Cháng, whose ruler is said to command an army of 20,000 men equipped with various weapons but no horses, a figure that concerns that state and not Qiān Zhī Fú.

On the basis of the name "Five Hills", Paul Pelliot tentatively identified Qiān Zhī Fú with Kancipura in southern India, which has a mountain of five peaks. Hoshino rejects this identification and instead places the polity inland, adjoining the Isan region, the neighbouring Mekong valley and Vietnam. He argues that the reference to southern Indians describes the settlement's historical connections rather than its geographical location, and that those connections had already declined by the time the Tang reports were compiled. Hoshino also cautions against the older identifications of the chapter's place names, noting that Pelliot's proposals were provisional and were subsequently adopted by Cœdès without re-examination. He further notes that Pelliot, encountering a passage that did not fit his reconstruction, considered it misplaced and proposed that it belonged in the section on India instead. (Note: The two readings differ in kind, not only in location. On Pelliot's, the entry is a notice of an Indian city that has strayed into a chapter on mainland Southeast Asia; on Hoshino's, it is a notice of a mainland polity whose Indian element is historical rather than geographical. Pelliot's study was published in 1904 and no work since has adjudicated between them.)

The chain of neighbours in the annals provides one line of evidence for the proposed location. Duō Mó Cháng stands immediately north of Qiān Zhī Fú, with Hē Líng (訶陵) further north. Pelliot and Cœdès identified Hē Líng with a polity on the island of Java, partly because it is placed south of Zhenla and because the Chinese sources also use Du Po for Java. On that reading, however, Qiān Zhī Fú would lie still farther south, at the southern limit of the Chinese geographical world, potentially in open sea or as far as Australia. Hoshino considers this implausible: Australia was not known to the Chinese at the time, the proposed region was not Indianised, and the islands of Southeast Asia contain no river comparable to the Ganges, although the annals place the group including Qiān Zhī Fú south of one.

Hoshino therefore distinguishes two places called Hē Líng. He identifies the northern Hē Líng with a polity around Sipsong Panna, drawing on Pelliot's citation of the biography of Wei Gao, where Hē Líng appears as the second of eight West Mountain chiefdoms that submitted in 793.

The position of Duō Mó Cháng also provides a geographical constraint from the north. The Chinese record states that travel across its territory was more difficult from east to west than from north to south. Hoshino interprets this as describing two or three river valleys separated by north–south mountain ranges, a configuration he associates with Lan Na, including the Yom and Nan basins and tributaries of the Mekong. If Duō Mó Cháng occupied the Yom and Nan basins, Qiān Zhī Fú would have lain in the plain immediately to its south, consistent with Hoshino's proposed location.

The name itself has also been considered. The suffix fú 弗 corresponds to the Sanskrit pūra, meaning "town" or "city", an element Hoshino also finds in Phetburi, Chanthaburi, Phetchabun and Si Khottabun. The prefix qiān 千 remains uninterpreted, and no identification with a local name has been established. The term xiān 暹, however, is attested in Chinese and Đại Việt sources for peoples and polities of the Chao Phraya River basin in the early second millennium.

Among the mainland candidates, Hoshino considers Lopburi and Si Thep and prefers Si Thep on three grounds: its sacred hills, the presence of the region's earliest Sanskrit inscriptions, and the quality of the sculpture found in its vicinity. He further identifies the polity with the primordial Canasapura, treating Mueang Sema as a regional administrative centre, and cites Dhida Saraya's 1985 study in support of this equation. He describes these identifications as tentative and consistent with the textual evidence rather than established by it, and states that nothing in the reconstruction of the period is certain. On the evidence of the Ratanabimbavamsa and the Jinakalamali, Thai scholars locate Ayojjhapura at Si Thep, the only substantial ancient settlement north of Lopburi. Si Thep has been claimed for another polity as well. Claude Jacques proposed in 2009 that the site was Dvāravatī itself, on the strength of its early cult of Viṣṇu and of Kṛṣṇa, whose legendary capital in Indian literature carries that name. Hiram Woodward reserves judgement on the identification of the other Chinese toponyms with Si Thep, holding that the evidence needs review by specialists in the Chinese sources.

== History ==
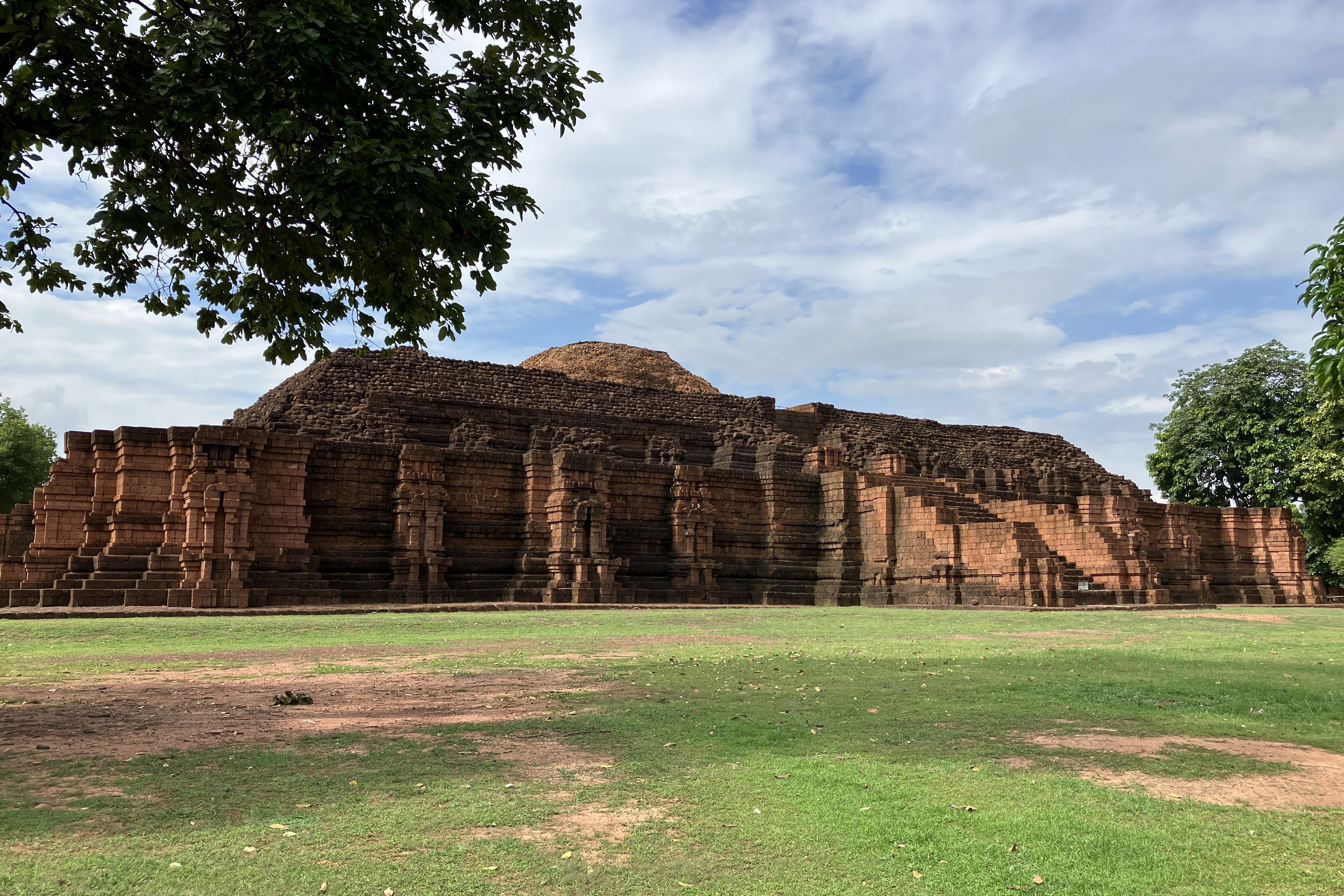
Khao Khlang Nok, one of the largest known ancient Dvaravati structures in Si Thep, 7th–8th century CE

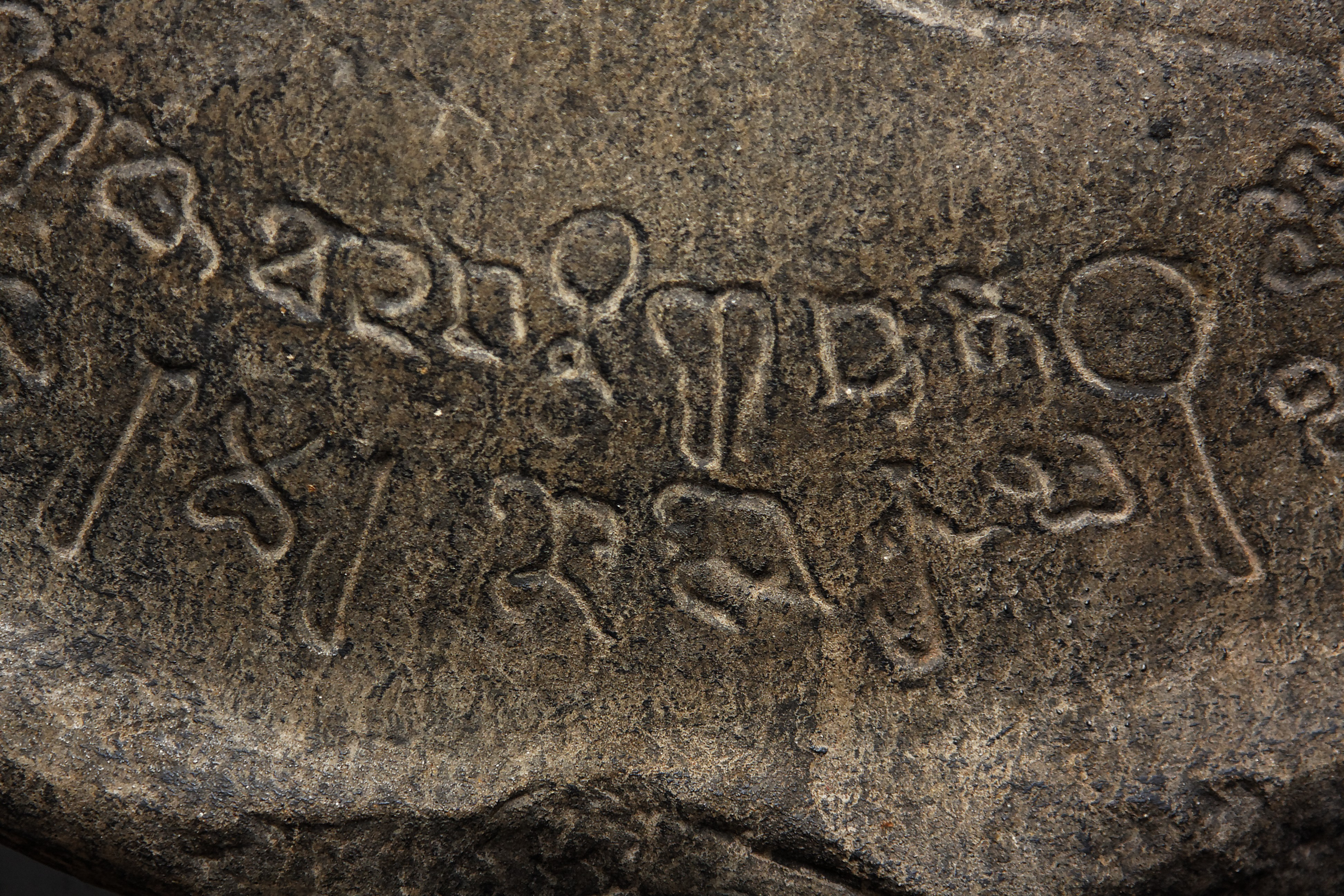
Pali inscription in Pallava script on a piece of artifact found in the moated settlement of Si Thep

=== Vaishnavite phase: 4th–8th centuries ===
Archaeological evidence indicates that Qiān at Si Thep developed from a prehistoric farming village approximately 2,500 years ago. During the first archaeological phase (c. 4th–5th century CE), the settlement occupied the inner town and had a burial tradition with offerings that indicate cultural interaction with India and communities in the central region and the Mun River basin. By the 7th century, Si Thep had developed a substantial Brahmanical presence, represented by large-scale stone sculptures including the standing four-armed Viṣṇu. The sculpture belongs to a tradition that spread across mainland Southeast Asia and has been associated with a Vaiṣṇava network extending from Arakan to western Java. Scholars suggest that mainland centres participated in the development and circulation of these artistic traditions rather than deriving them from a single source. Other sculptures associated with Si Thep include a Viṣṇu head, a Kṛṣṇa Govardhana, and a fragmentary goddess, while two gold plaques depicting Viṣṇu date to the late 7th or early 8th century.

Written and indigenous traditions provide a separate body of evidence for Si Thep's connections. Local traditions from the western Menam Valley connect Si Thep, mentioned as "Manohana", with other regions. They recount that Siddhijaya Brahmadeva, said to have originated from Si Thep, (Note: The original text says he originated from Manohana, a city identified by Sukanya Sudchaya with Ayojjhapura, which Pensupa Sukkata has in turn equated with Si Thep.) moved to establish political authority in the area of present-day Nakhon Pathom and maintained close relations with the king of Lanka.

According to descriptions of Qiān Zhī Fú in the New Tang Annals, which correspond to Canasapura (Jiā Luó Shě Fú, 迦逻舍佛), Tatsuo Hoshino identifies the two polities as the same kingdom during the 7th–8th centuries. He hypothesizes that Qiān Zhī Fú extended eastward into the present-day Chaiyaphum province and further into Nakhon Ratchasima province, encompassing the site at Mueang Sema in the 7th century. Local tradition suggests that Qiān Zhī Fú at Si Thep may have established dynastic relations with the coastal polity of Dvaravati at Kamalanka, which placed its southern neighbor, Tou Yuan, between the allied monarchs Dvaravati to the south and Qiān Zhī Fú to the north. Following the Dvaravati annexation of Tou Yuan, refounded as the Lavo Kingdom in 648, Dvaravati expanded into Qiān Zhī Fú's southeastern territory at Mueang Sema during the subsequent century, prompting Qiān Zhī Fú to cede control of the Nakhon Ratchasima region and retract to its core territory in the northern Menam plain and Pasak Valley. Consequently, based on Tatsuo Hoshino's theory, Si Thep served as the capital of Canasapura, while Mueang Sema functioned as a regional administrative center.

Thai historian Athitthan Chanklom (อธิษฐาน จันทร์กลม) similarly includes Si Thep within the Canasapura polity. Research by Karen M. Mudar also excludes Si Thep from the Dvaravati sphere. Peter Skilling cautions that the evidential basis for Cānāśa itself is narrow, the name being attested in two inscriptions alone, the Bo Ika inscription (K.400) and an inscription of 937 recovered at Ayutthaya (K.949), and in no literary source. These interpretations are consistent with a local tradition preserved in the Legend of Phra Praton, which recounts that Dvaravati once launched an attack against Si Thep in the 7th century, overthrew the reigning monarch Manohanaraj, and carried him into captivity in Dvaravati.

In the aftermath of these conflicts, the Lavo—as successor of Tou Yuan under Dvaravati—engaged in further campaigns against Chenla to the southeast. Tatsuo Hoshino suggests that multiple kingdoms participated in these conflicts, including Cān Bàn and Zhū Jiāng, allied with Chenla, and other minor Siamese–Tai polities, including Si Thep's Qiān Zhī Fú or Gē Luó Shě Fēn, Xiū Luó Fēn, and Gān Bì, whose forces the New Book of Tang puts at 20,000 warriors each for Śrī Canāśapura and Xiū Luó Fēn, 40,000 for the two together, and 5,000 for Gān Bì, and who might align with whichever patron was willing to reward them. The Cefu Yuangui entry for the fifth month of 665, which records a joint arrival of missions, describes Gē Luó Shě Fēn as lying in the southern part of the South Seas and connected on the east with Duoheluo (Dvaravati), names its king as Pujiayuemo and gives it an army of twenty thousand, and states that its envoy set out in 656 and reached China only in 665. The same entry places Xiū Luó Fēn in the northern part of the South Seas, with a city built of wood, Zhenla to the east and the sea to the south, and names its king as Shidamotipo. Some of these engagements may have coincided with early 10th-century conflicts between Lavo and its northern Monic sister kingdom, Haripuñjaya, which weakened Dvaravati and led to the eastern portion of Dvaravati being subordinated to Tambralinga and Angkor in the 10th and 11th centuries, respectively.

=== Buddhist ascendancy and expansion: 8th–10th centuries ===
Buddhism supplanted Vaishnavism at Si Thep. Dvaravati's influence over the Menam Valleys declined, allowing monarchs from Qiān Zhī Fú and other Tai principalities in the upper plain to gradually assimilate remaining Dvaravati entities. As noted in the Cefu Yuangui, Gē Luó Shě Fēn, a corrupted form of Si Thep's Jiā Luó Shě Fú, controlled territory west of Dvaravati, (Note: The Chinese notices give the polity two different positions relative to Dvaravati, one to the north and one to the west. Hoshino explains the discrepancy as an early Tang report collated with a later one rather than as an error in either, and reads the difference between them as a record of territorial change over the intervening decades.) granting access to maritime trade routes and contact with Srivijaya. Direct evidence of Buddhist contact with China in this phase comes from three clay sealings recovered from the Khlang Nai stūpa at Si Thep, each inscribed before firing with the name of a Chinese monk, Wenxiang, and probably of the eighth century. Historical accounts record a Siamese naval expedition led by Passara, son of the king of Syam, which attempted to reach Macassar on Sulawesi but was diverted by a storm near Bali, subsequently establishing the settlement of Passaraan in Java in 800 CE.

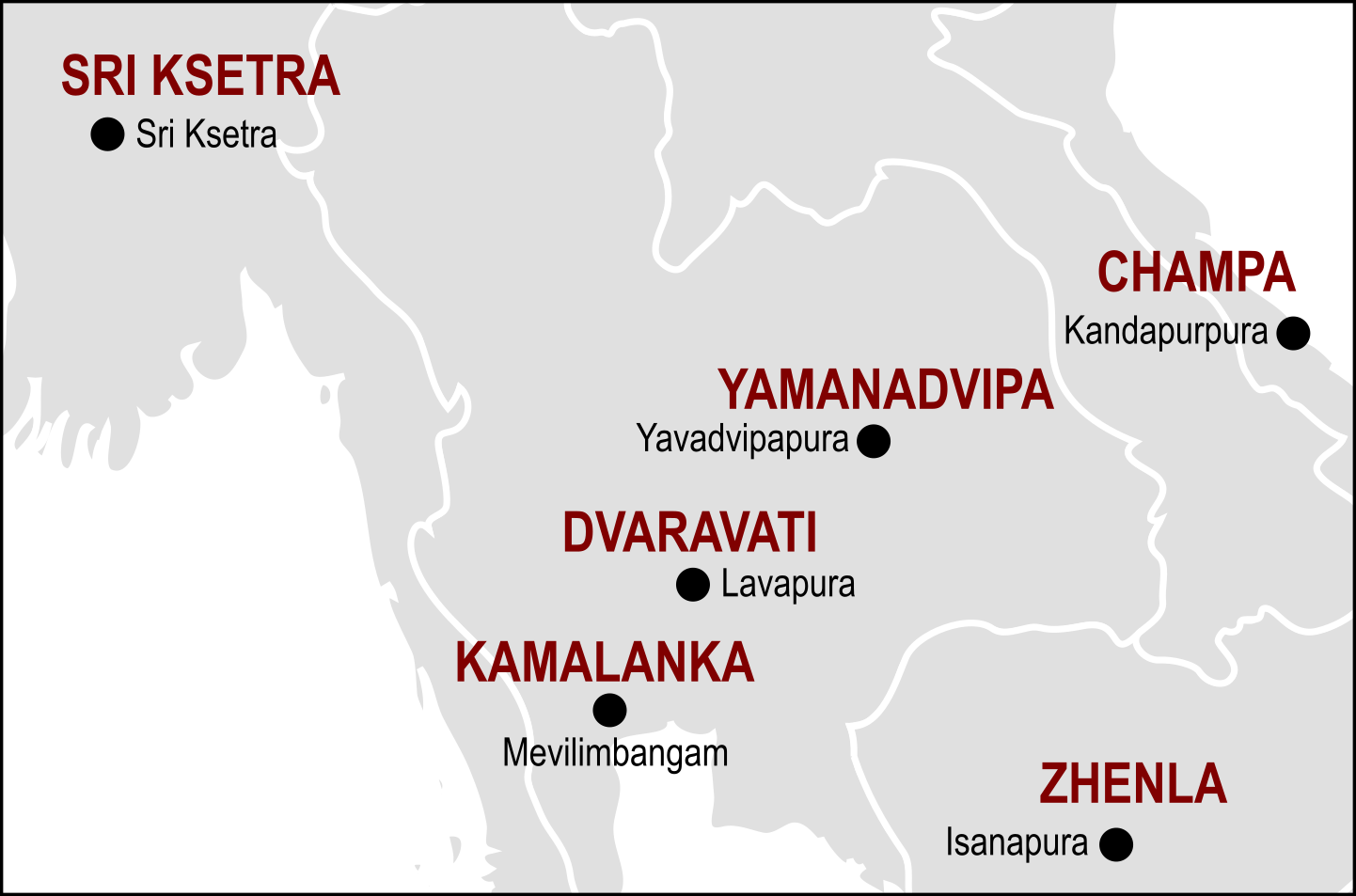
Six ancient kingdoms in Mainland Southeast Asia in the late 7th century mentioned by Xuanzang.

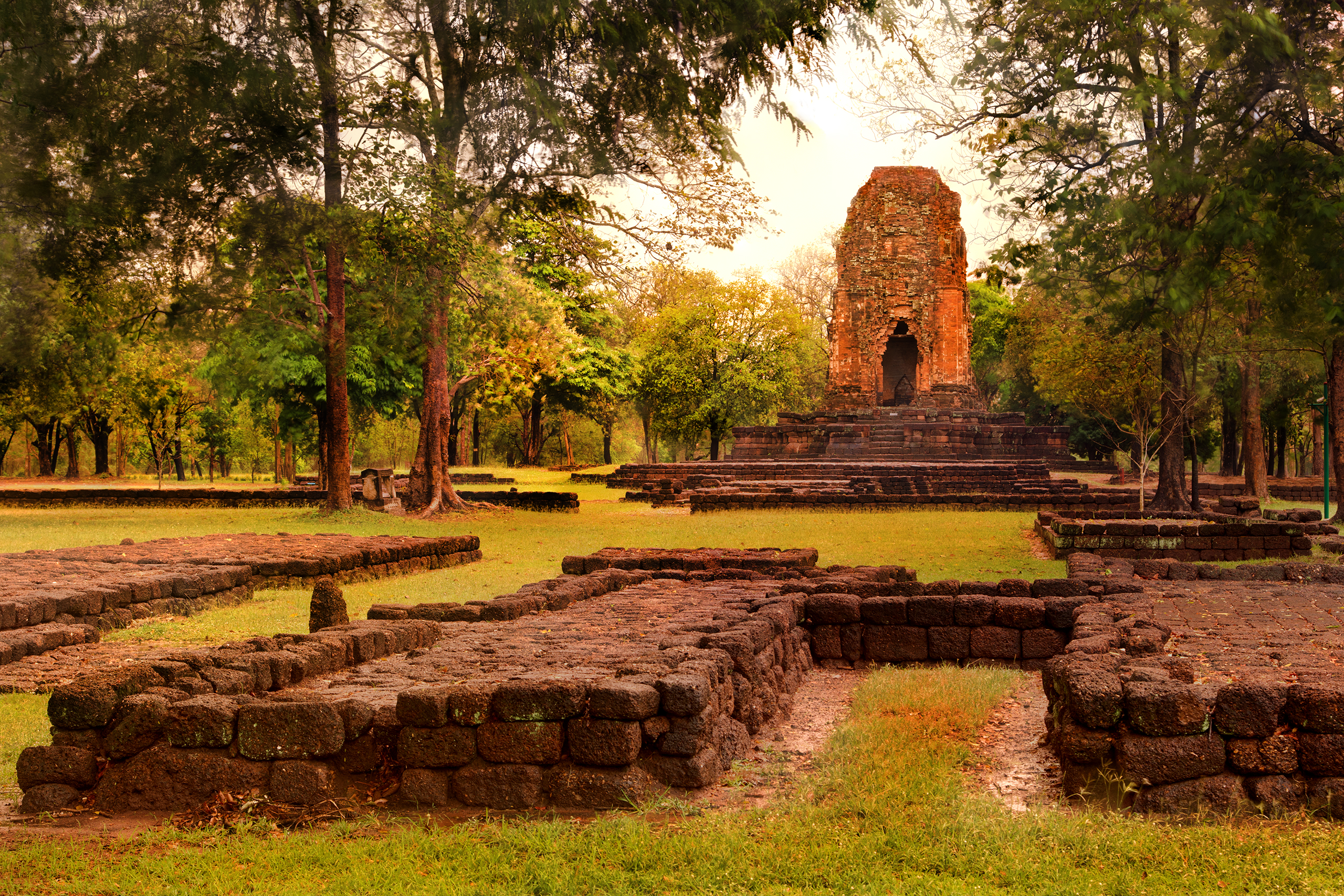
Prang Si Thep, constructed in Angkorian architectural style during the late Dvaravati period, c. 12th century.

The relocation of the political center to the western lower plain and the enthronement of Qiān Zhī Fú's new—likely Daic-speaking—dynasty at the western terminus of the trans-Mekong trade route, combined with conflicts between northern Champa and Daic-related Đại Việt at the eastern terminus, resulted in the inland Cham polity of Zhān Bó and other former confederated states in the Chi–Mun basin losing access to maritime routes and dissolving their alliance with Qiān Zhī Fú at Si Thep. These Chi-Mun polities, later associated with Yamanadvipa or Java, established the new trading polities in the area of Angkor to the south to secure maritime access through the Tonlé Sap and lower Mekong. Within a few decades, Angkor emerged as the dominant regional power, eclipsing inland kingdoms.

Hiram Woodward places the turning point earlier, at the accession of Jayavarman II in 802, and reads the absence of remains at Si Thep clearly datable to the 9th century, together with the ending of Wen Dan's embassies to China at about the same date, as evidence that Jayavarman II defeated Wen Dan. Thermoluminescence dates from bricks at Khao Khlang Nok, the large monument outside the town wall, fall in this range, 720–848 and 821–875. Woodward placed Si Thep within Wen Dan and suggested that the Buddhist bronzes from the Plai Bat hill hoard in Prakhon Chai and Lahan Sai districts may represent Wen Dan workmanship. He further proposed that craftsmen were moved northward as Wen Dan expanded during the first half of the 8th century. On that reading a Si Thep strong enough to dominate the 8th century implies a division of central Dvaravati into pre- and post-Wen Dan phases. He offers the placement only as a possibility, noting that the Dvaravati features at Si Thep might instead have followed from a peaceful movement of monks before Wen Dan's rise.

Meanwhile, the same area also appears in Siamese chronicle tradition as Talung (เมืองตลุง), which is said to have been brought under the suzerainty of Padumasuriyavamsa between 757 and about 800. However, this tradition has not been directly examined in relation to Woodward's reconstruction of Wen Dan.

Indaprasthanagara, between Nakhon Pathom and Si Thep, entered a period of instability marked by rapid succession in the 9th century. Its chronicle describes a major flood followed by an attack from Ayojjhapura, which some scholars identify with Si Thep, after which much of the population dispersed.

The Pali Ratanabimbavamsa or The Chronicle of the Emerald Buddha references a polity named Ayojjhapura, situated north of Lavapura. Its ruler subsequently invaded Inthapatnakhon (อินทปัตย์นคร), and acquired the Emerald Buddha. These events likely occurred in the early 10th century, after the period of the great king of Inthapatnakhon, Padumasuriyavamsa (r. 757–800). Another Pali chronicle, Jinakalamali, describes Ayojjhapura as a metropolitan center (mahā-nagara) governed by Rajadhiraj, recognized as the preeminent ruler of Rāmaññadesa.

The expansion proposed for Si Thep's sphere overlaps with a break in the later dynastic traditions of the Menam basin. Those traditions name Sai Thong Som at Nakhon Pathom and his brother Balipatijaya at Lavo as the last rulers of their line, without successors, and record no successor to Balidhiraja at Sukhothai either, which some local scholars have read as evidence that that city was abandoned. Hoshino instead places the area within Qiān Zhī Fú, extending northward to the mountain range. The last ruler related to the Nakhon Pathom line known from an inscription is Nāyaka Ārjava, named by K.577 at Lopburi, of the 8th or 9th century, as a son of the king of Sambuka.

=== Angkorian rule and decline: 10th–14th centuries ===
Qiān at Si Thep came under the authority of the Shaivism Angkor polity in 946, as evidenced by inscriptions recording the victory of Angkorian king Rajendravarman II (r. 944–968) over Rāmaññadesa to the west. Following this event, Qiān Zhī Fú experienced a decline in prosperity, potentially attributable to climate disruptions, epidemic crises, or alterations in Angkorian trade policies during the 12th–13th centuries. The residual population subsequently migrated to Lavo's Lavapura and to Xiān's Ayodhya. Its seat at Si Thep appears to have been abandoned by the 13th century, coinciding with the rise of Sukhothai as the new political center of the upper Menam Valley.

During the later phase of Qiān Zhī Fú at Si Thep, an early Siamese dynastic line transitioned to Yassouttora Nacoora Louang or Tasoo Nacora Louang, identified with Lavapura of Lavo. Following the loss of the eastern Menam Valley to Angkorian expansion, this dynasty temporarily relocated northward to Sukhothai/Nakhon Thai circa the 1150s. Subsequently, the monarchs shifted their focus southward to the western Menam Valley, where they consolidated control over the region as part of Xiān’s territorial domain, encompassing Suphannabhum, and undertook the reestablishment of Phrip Phri. This region subsequently emerged as a new political and cultural power base for Xiān until the establishment of the Ayutthaya Kingdom in the mid-14th century. The Xiān regained influence over the eastern Menam Valleys at Lavo, previously lost to Angkor, around the 1280s, as indicated by records of significant Xiān settlements in Lavo, as well as Lavo tributes sent to China in 1289 and 1299.

== Trade routes ==
Baker and Pasuk rank Si Thep as probably the second largest town of the Chao Phraya plain, a moated site of the Pa Sak valley occupied from the 6th century, enlarged many times and given several large monuments, among them Khao Klang Nok, 64 metres square and about 20 metres high, built of large laterite blocks to a design without parallel. When many sites founded in the 6th century declined or were abandoned from the late 9th, Si Thep and Nakhon Pathom were among the few that were enlarged instead, and Si Thep stood with Mueang Sema and Si Mahosot on what they call the cultural border between the plain and the plateau, where Angkorian-style temples were built.

The Chinese records describe a network of overland and river routes crossing the middle Mekong region and linking several of the interior polities. Hoshino places Lopburi at its western end and proposes that the route continued east beyond the mountains to the South China Sea. He points to the number of archaeological sites and finds along its course in Isan as evidence of movement across the region from prehistoric times through the Tang period. Traffic across the Mekong was not new in the seventh century, but he judges that its volume rose sharply during the Tang and that a place standing both on this route and at the crossing of others would have been enriched by it; when the traffic first became heavy enough to produce such a hub he leaves open. The inland states along it are distinguished in his account from the coastal territories dominated by Dvaravati, whose wealth came from maritime trade.

Several of the states recorded in Chinese sources near the eastern arm of the route are dated to the seventh and eighth centuries. Hoshino interprets them as Tai-dominated, although Hiram Woodward considers this part of the argument tendentious and argues that it should neither support nor invalidate the geographical reconstruction. (Note: Hiram Woodward, who accepts Hoshino's geographical conclusions, regards the argument that these polities were Tai-speaking as tendentious and holds that it should be used neither to support nor to invalidate them.) They include Gān Bì (甘毕), which could mobilise 5,000 soldiers and which he places in the vicinity of present-day Savannakhet; Jūn Nà Lú (郡那盧; Cantonese gwan1 naa5 lou4), rendered in Thai and Lao as "แคว้นนาลาว" and "ແຄວ້ນນາລາວ", "country of Lao rice fields", which he places in the area of modern Sakhon Nakhon and counts among three states lying up-river from the Tang prefectural centre of Changzhou rather than within it; and an unidentified Gǔ Láng Dòng (古郎洞), which Hoshino takes for the name of a Tai state, on the road between that prefecture's two districts, the second of which he places near Thakhek. Further north the same chapter gives an overland route from Duō Mó Cháng to Jiaozhou by way of Lin Yi in central Vietnam.

The tribute mission of 657 provides evidence of contact among several of these polities. Qiān Zhī Fú travelled as one of five, under the leadership of Zhān Bó; the others were Pó Àn (婆岸), whose name Hoshino suggests survives in that of Mueang Phon in Khon Kaen province, Shě Bá Ruò (舍跋若), which he places at Suphan Buri, and Mó Là (摩臘), which he identifies in one passage as a Cham port on the South China Sea, comparing the name with Mloi, and in another as a Malay or Mon town. The party reached the Tang court with elephants and rhinoceroses. Hoshino interprets their joint reception as an acknowledgement of Zhān Bó's leadership; if Mó Là was indeed a Cham port, he suggests that the envoys may have completed the journey by sea from there. He compares the group with the chain of allied princes and chiefs named in the Ram Khamhaeng inscription five centuries later, while noting that the 657 mission comprised only five small states.

== People ==
Tatsuo Hoshino has suggested that Qiān Zhī Fú was one of the early Siamese kingdoms of the trans-Mekong network, later Taicized. Other polities proposed as contemporary Siamese-related states included Cān Bàn, Xiū Luó Fēn, and Wen Dan. His argument for grouping them rests on the New Book of Tang itself, which places Qiān Zhī Fú, Xiū Luó Fēn and Gān Bì in a single category and reports that the customs of each resembled those of the others; all three were fortified, and Hoshino reads their military organisation as characteristic of Tai-dominated states.

A separate line of evidence comes from the terms Siam and Syam, attested in several inscriptions and interpreted by earlier scholars as references to a specific location or population within the Chao Phraya Basin. These include K557 (611 CE), K79 (639 CE), K127 (683 CE), K154 (685 CE), and K904 (713 CE). Syam later occurs in slave lists on inscriptions of the Champa and Khmer kingdoms, dated to the 11th and 12th centuries. From approximately the same period, a well-known bas-relief panel at Angkor Wat depicts mercenaries of the Angkorian army identified as syam-kuk, which has been interpreted as referring to Siamese people.

As opposed to the old assumptions, the consensus of modern scholars, like Vittorio Roveda, B.P. Groslier, Saveros Pou, and Michael Vickery, is that the 12th century marching “Syam Kuk” depicted on Angkor Wat are not the Tai/Siamese (ethnic Thai). Vickery also rejects the claims from some scholars that “syām” comes from the Sanskrit śyāma, meaning “dark” (as in “dark complexioned”). He instead documents the usage of Syam, Sien, Siam, and the Chinese Hsien by the Cham, Khmer, and Chinese to explain syām kuk describes a geographic location, specifically the south central plains of modern Thailand, rather than an ethnic groupe. This area was populated by the Mon-Khmer in the 12th century, not the Thai/Siamese.

A Monic element in the population is attested separately. The Nyah Kur, who speak a conservative Mon dialect, still inhabit the highlands around Si Thep, and their presence has been taken to indicate that the early inhabitants of the region were Monic and were absorbed into Tai culture over time, a process associated with the arrival of northern Chiang Saen and eastern Lao-Phuthai groups and with trade contacts toward southern China and Đại Việt. A comparable shift is reported for the Kaleun people, thought to descend from the Austroasiatic Bru people and to have adopted a Southwestern Tai language.

== Rulers ==
An inscription discovered at Ban Wang Pai, Phetchabun province (K.978), records the enthronement of a new monarch, identified as a son of Prathivindravarman. George Cœdès's original reading dated the inscription to around 550 CE and identified this son with Bhavavarman I of Chenla, suggesting the existence of dynastic connections between Qiān Zhī Fú and Chenla, although the king's own personal name remains unrecorded in the text itself. Thai scholar Kangwon Katchima argues that the Bhavavarman mentioned in the inscription may not correspond to Bhavavarman I of Chenla, given that the inscription was likely transcribed after 627, several decades subsequent to Bhavavarman I's reign. The reference could therefore pertain to Bhavavarman II—whose origin remains unclear—or to another monarch of the same name. Anurak Depimai supported Katchima's redating and rejected the identification of the king as Bhavavarman II, noting that the Wat Kud Tae inscription identifies Bhavavarman II as a son of Isanavarman I, not of Prathivindravarman. Depimai instead identified the Wang Phai king as a local ruler of Si Thep who adopted Chenla-style royal titulature.

The use of the South Indian regnal title varman among Qiān Zhī Fú rulers indicates substantial influence from south Indian culture, consistent with Chinese sources reporting that the polity was once a South Indian colony before attaining independence at the time of its diplomatic mission to the Tang dynasty under Emperor Gaozong of Tang circa 656–661.

If Qiān Zhī Fú at Si Thep was the primordial Canasapura, then it is plausible that the Canasapura monarchs listed in the Śri Canāśa Inscription K.949, discovered on the island of Ayutthaya, (Note: The find-spot is about 250 km from either candidate site. Peter Skilling notes that old Khorat lay on the routes taken by Ayutthayan armies marching to the plateau and that the stone may therefore have been carried to Ayutthaya, and that Cānāśa is attested in this inscription and the Bo Ika inscription alone, with no literary source.) may have reigned at Si Thep. Notably, an Angkorian inscription dated 946 records the victory of king Rajendravarman II over Rāmaññadesa (lit. 'country of the Mon'), coinciding with a period during which the regnal titles of Si Thep Canasapura rulers transitioned from the Buddhism-associated "datta" or "krama" to the Hindu-oriented "varman". Archaeological evidence from Si Thep dating to this era further corroborates Angkorian influence.

The Pali Jinakalamali recounts the enthronement of Camadevi at Haripuñjaya in 662 CE and mentions her spouse, Ramaraja, who has been interpreted by multiple Thai scholars as the monarch of Ramburi (รามบุรี; lit. 'city of Rama'). The identification of Ramburi remains contested; it has been alternatively proposed that Ramaraja was a prince of Lavo, a prince of Srivijaya, a ruler of Mawlamyine, or a sovereign of Ayutthaya's antecedent polity, Ayojjhapura at Si Thep.

Additionally, the 9th-century Sanskrit Phu Khiao Kao inscription K.404, located approximately 100 kilometers northeast of Si Thep in present-day Kaset Sombun district of Chaiyaphum province, mentions a king named Jayasimhavarmman. His precise identity remains uncertain; prior scholarship has variably suggested that he may have ruled Wen Dan, Bhavapura, or Champa. Definitive identification, however, is currently lacking.

The following is the list of kings of Qiān Zhī Fú's Si Thep; some of them have currently been the subject of debate.

Name		Reign	Note	Source
Romanized	Thai	Reign	Note	Source
Chakravantin (Note: In the case of Prathivindravarman was the father of Bhavavarman I or Bhavavarman II of Chenla) (Note: George Cœdès proposed identifying Chakravantin with Rudravarman, the last ruler of Funan; Claude Jacques instead proposed Devanika of the Vat Phou inscription (K.365), an identification disputed by Zakharova. See Dvaravati § Dvaravati–Chenla relations for the fuller debate.)	จักรวรรติน	5th century (Note: If the Bhavavarman mentioned in the inscription is not Bhavavarman I or Bhavavarman II of Chenla, but a local ruler of Si Thep using Chenla-style titulature, as Anurak Depimai has argued following Kangwon Katchima's palaeographic redating of the inscription to after 627 CE. On this reading, the dates given here for Chakravantin, Prathivindravarman and this king — which follow George Cœdès's original mid-6th-century dating and his identification of the king with Bhavavarman I — would need to be revised later by roughly a century; no source yet proposes specific replacement dates for the two earlier generations.)	Father of Prathivindravarman	Wang Pai Inscription (K.978)
Prathivindravarman (Note: As king of Si Thep)	ปฤถิวีนทรวรมัน	5th century	Father of Bhavavarman I or II of Chenla?	Wang Pai Inscription (K.978)
Unknown or Bhavavarman	ภววรมัน	Early 6th-c.	Son of Prathivindravarman; In 590, King Siddhijaya Brahmadeva of Si Thep established authority in the Nakhon Pathom region, provoking conflict with the local ruler Kakabhadra.; Qiān Zhī Fú's Si Thep – Kamalanka's Nakhon Pathom royal intermarriage established	Wang Pai Inscription (K.978)
Unknown		550–?	Son of Prathivindravarman; In 590, King Siddhijaya Brahmadeva of Si Thep established authority in the Nakhon Pathom region, provoking conflict with the local ruler Kakabhadra.; Qiān Zhī Fú's Si Thep – Kamalanka's Nakhon Pathom royal intermarriage established	Wang Pai Inscription (K.978)
Ramaraja (Note: As king of Ramburi, the Ayutthaya's predecessor, also known as Ayojjhapura.)	รามราช	c. 662	Spouse of Haripuñjaya's queen Camadevi; Qiān's first embassy mission to China around 656–661.	Jinakalamali
Under Dvaravati, centered at Nakhon Pathom–Lavo
During the 7th century, Gē Luó Shě Fēn lay west of Dvaravati on the later of the two Chinese reports, and shared a border with it on the east and on the south.
Pú jiā yuè mó (Note: As king of Gē Luó Shě Fēn)		c. 665 (Note: The year 665 is that in which the mission sent in his name reached the Chinese court; the Cefu Yuangui records that its envoy had set out in 656.)	As king of Gē Luó Shě Fēn; Potentially a dual monarchy of Kamalanka and Qiān Zhī Fú	Cefu Yuangui
The line was split into two seats: Ayojjhapura at Si Thep and Arimadhanaburi at Nakhon Pathom
Rajadhiraj (Note: As king of Ayojjhapura)	ราชาธิราช	Mid 7th c.	Raided Lampang, part of Haripuñjaya, and took the black stone Sikhī images to Ayojjhapura; The raid post-dates the enthronement of Camadevi at Haripuñjaya in 662	Jinakalamali
Manohanaraj	มโนหารราช	?–after 688	Son of the previous; Overthrown and carried off by Anuruddha of Arimadhanaburi.; Anuruddha gave the obtained Buddha images of Sikhī to Camadevi, who then returned to her son Hanayos, who acceded at Lampang in 688.	Jinakalamali
Woodward proposed that Si Thep exercised some control over Lopburi, Nakhon Pathom, U Thong and Khu Bua during the early 8th century.
Unknown (Under Wen Dan)		Early 8th century	Woodward proposed that Si Thep probably fell within the political sphere of Wen Dan in the early 8th century.	
Emergence of Indaprasthanagara in 757. The chronicle traditions give Padumasūriyavaṁśa (r. 757–800) suzerainty over Sukhothai, Lavo and Talung.
Dvaravati civilization began to decline around the mid-8th to 9th centuries.
Adītaraj	อาทิตยราช	Late 8th-c. – early 9th-c.	Attacked Indaprasthanagara	Ratanabimbavamsa
The following four rulers were traditionally identified as monarchs of Muang Sema. However, if Si Thep functioned as the principal centre of Canasapura, as Hoshino proposes, their reigns may have been based at Si Thep instead.
Bhagadatta	ภคทัตต์	859–early 10th-c.	Relative of Bhavavarman II?	Śri Canāśa Inscription K.949
Sri Sundaraprakrama	ศรีสุนทรปรากรม	early 10th-c.	Son of the previous	Śri Canāśa Inscription K.949
Sri Sundararavarman	ศรีสุนทรวรมัน	?–937	Son of the previous	Śri Canāśa Inscription K.949
Narapatisimhavarman	ศรีนรปติสิงหวรมัน	937–971	At Si Thep seat. Son of the previous	Śri Canāśa Inscription K.949
Mangalavarman	มงคลวรมัน	971–986	At Muang Sema seat. Younger brother of the previous.	Śri Canāśa Inscription K.949
In 946, the Angkorian king Rajendravarman II won over Rāmaññadesa (lit. 'country of the Mon', possibly Lavapura or Si Thep).
Vap Upendra (Note: As the Governor of Rāmaññadesa)	วาป อุเปนทร	949–960s?	Relative of Rajendravarman II of Ankor	Rajendravarman II Inscription
Si Thep fell under Angkor around the 10th century. During this period, the center of power was probably shifted to Lavo's Lavapura, and the Menam Basin was then divided into two main polities: Lavo Kingdom to the east and Suphannaphum to the west. Moreover, a new settlement known as Mueang Wat Derm (เมืองวัดเดิม) was founded southwestward in the lower plain in 934. (Note: Calculated from the text given in the chronicle: "สิ้น 97 ปีสวรรคต ศักราชได้ 336 ปี พระยาโคดมได้ครองราชสมบัติอยู่ ณ วัดเดิม 30 ปี" which is transcribed as "...at the age of 97, he passed away in the year 336 of the Chula Sakarat. Phraya Kodom reigned in the Mueang Wat Derm for 30 years...".) In the 1080s, the city was set as Lavo's new capital and renamed Ayodhya, which continued to the formation of the Ayutthaya Kingdom in the 14th century.
