= Mon kingdoms =

Historical polities in present-day Myanmar and Thailand

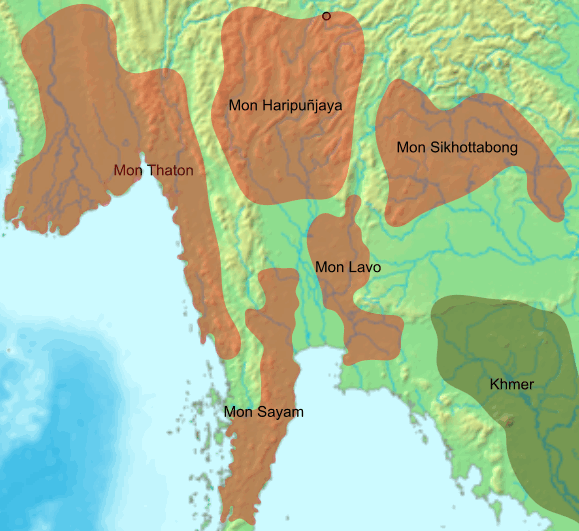
Political entities of the ancient Mon people around the 6th–7th centuries.

Mon kingdoms were polities established by the Mon-speaking people in parts of present-day Laos, Myanmar and Thailand. The polities ranged from Dvaravati and Haripuñjaya in present-day northern Thailand to Thaton, Hanthawaddy (1287–1539), and the Restored Hanthawaddy (1740–1757) in southern Myanmar.

== Early states ==
=== Dvaravati ===
The first recorded kingdom attributed to the Mon people is Dvaravati. Dvaravati culture was marked by moated urban settlements, with early and major centers including U Thong (in present-day Suphan Buri Province), Nakhon Pathom, Si Thep, Khu Bua, and Si Mahosot. The name “Dvaravati” comes from Sanskrit dvāravatī, meaning “that which has gates,” and appears on coins and inscriptions. A 6th-century inscription found at Wat Phra Ngam in Nakhon Pathom province mentions Dvāravatī alongside two other cities, suggesting Nakhon Pathom may have been its central city.

Traditional dating relied on Chinese records and art history, but excavations at U Thong suggest Dvaravati culture may have begun as early as 200 CE. Its main period, however, was the 7th to 9th centuries. Dvaravati influence spread into Isan and parts of lowland Laos from the 6th century onward, with sites such as Mueang Fa Daet and Sema in Nakhon Ratchasima Province.

The earliest known inscription mentioning “Dvaravati” is the Wat Chanthuek Inscription (K.1009), found in Pak Chong, Nakhon Ratchasima Province, dated to the 5th century CE. It records a queen of Dvaravati ordering her daughter to sponsor a Buddha image.

=== Thaton (400 BCE–1057) ===
According to colonial period scholarships, the Mon established small polities (or large city-states) in Lower Burma in the 9th century. Both the city of Thaton and Pegu (Bago) are believed to have been established in the 400 BCE. The states were important trading ports between Indian Ocean and mainland Southeast Asia. Still, according to traditional reconstruction, the early Mon city-states were conquered by the Pagan Kingdom from the north in 1057, and that Thaton's literary and religious traditions helped to mould early Pagan civilisation. Between 1050 and about 1085, Mon craftsmen and artisans helped to build some two thousand monuments at Pagan, the remains of which today rival the splendors of Angkor Wat. The Mon script is considered to be the source of the Burmese script, the earliest evidence of which was dated to 1058, a year after the Thaton conquest, by the colonial era scholarship.

However, research from the 2000s—still a minority view—argues that Mon influence on the interior after Anawrahta's conquest is a greatly exaggerated post-Pagan legend, and that Lower Burma in fact lacked a substantial independent polity prior to Pagan's expansion. Possibly in this period, the delta sedimentation—which now extends the coastline by three miles (4.8 kilometres) in a century—remained insufficient, and the sea still reached too far inland, to support a population even as large as the modest population of the late precolonial era. The earliest evidence of Burmese script is dated to 1035, and possibly as early as 984, both of which are earlier than the earliest evidence of the Burma Mon script (1093). Research from the 2000s argues that the Pyu script was the source of the Burmese script.

Though the size and importance of these states are still debated, all scholars accept that during the 11th century, Pagan established its authority in Lower Burma and this conquest facilitated growing cultural exchange, if not with local Mon, then with India and with Theravada stronghold Sri Lanka. From a geopolitical standpoint, Anawrahta's conquest of Thaton checked the Khmer advance in the Tenasserim coast.

== Hanthawaddy (1287–1539, 1550–1552) ==
In 1287, the Pagan Empire collapsed due to Mongol invasions, and all its vassal states became independent. In present-day Lower Burma, Wareru established a kingdom for the Mon-speaking people called Ramannadesa by unifying three Mon-speaking regions of Lower Burma: Martaban (Mottama), Pegu (Bago), the Irrawaddy delta. The kingdom's first capital was at Martaban but the capital was moved to Pegu in 1369.

For its first 100 years, the kingdom was merely a loose collection of three Mon-speaking regions. The high kings at the capital had little substantive authority over the vassals. Indeed, Martaban was in open rebellion from 1363 to 1389. A more centralised rule came with the reign of King Razadarit, who not only firmly unified the three Mon-speaking regions together but also successfully fended off the northern Burmese-speaking Kingdom of Ava in the Forty Years' War (1385–1424). The war ended in a stalemate but it was a victory for Hanthawaddy as Ava finally gave up its dream of restoring the Pagan Empire. In the years following the war, Pegu occasionally aided Ava's southern vassal states of Prome and Toungoo in their rebellions but carefully avoided getting plunged into a full-scale war.

After the war, Hanthawaddy entered its golden age whereas its rival Ava gradually went into decline. From the 1420s to the 1530s, Hanthawaddy was the most powerful and prosperous kingdom of all post-Pagan kingdoms. Under a string of especially gifted monarchs—Binnya Ran I, Shin Sawbu, Dhammazedi and Binnya Ran II—the kingdom enjoyed a long golden age, profiting from foreign commerce. Its merchants traded with traders from across the Indian Ocean, filling the king's treasury with gold and silver, silk and spices, and all the other stuff of early modern trade. The kingdom also became a famous centre of Theravada Buddhism. It established strong ties with Ceylon, and encouraged reforms that later spread throughout the country.

The powerful kingdom's end came abruptly. Due to the inexperience of King Takayutpi, the kingdom was captured by a smaller kingdom to the north, Kingdom of Toungoo in 1539 led by King Tabinshwehti and his deputy Gen. Bayinnaung. Toungoo captured the Irrawaddy delta and Pegu in 1538–1539, and Martaban in 1541. The kingdom was briefly revived in 1550 after Tabinshwehti was assassinated. But Bayinnaung quickly defeated the rebellion in 1552.

== Restored Hanthawaddy (1740–1757) ==
Though Toungoo kings would rule all of Lower Burma well into the mid-18th century, the golden age of Hanthawaddy was fondly remembered by the Mon. In 1740, they rose up against a weak Toungoo Dynasty on its last legs, and succeeded in restoring the fallen Hanthawaddy Kingdom. Supported by the French, the upstart kingdom quickly carved out a space for itself in Lower Burma, and continued its push northward. On 23 March 1752, its forces captured Ava, and ended the 266-year-old Toungoo dynasty.

A new dynasty called Konbaung led by King Alaungpaya rose in Upper Burma to challenge the southern forces, and went on to conquer all of Upper Burma by January 1754. After Hanthawaddy's second invasion of Upper Burma failed in May 1754, the kingdom's leadership in self-defeating measures killed off the Toungoo royal family, and persecuted ethnic Burmans in the south, both of which only strengthened Alaungpaya's hand. In 1755, Alaungpaya invaded Lower Burma. Konbaung forces captured the Irrawaddy delta in May 1755, the French defended port of Thanlyin in July 1756, and finally the capital Pegu in May 1757.

The fall of Restored Hanthawaddy was the beginning of the end of Mon people's centuries-old dominance of Lower Burma. Konbaung armies' reprisals forced thousands of Mons to flee to Siam. By the early 19th century, assimilation, inter-marriage, and mass migration of Burman families from the north had reduced the Mon population to a small minority.
