= Ayodhyapura =

Ancient settlement in Thailand

Ayojjhapura
- อโยชฌปุระ (Thai)
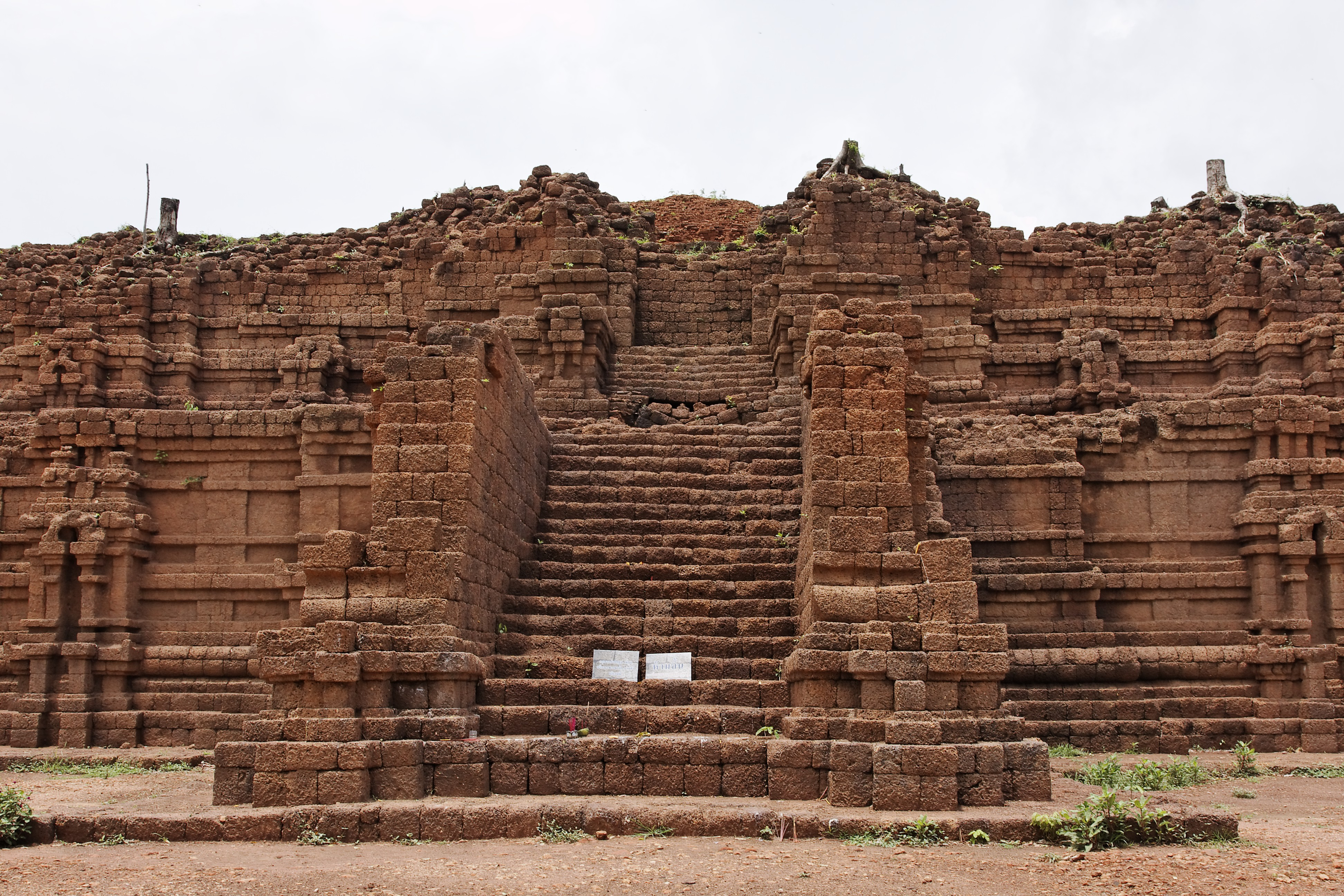
- Khao Khlang Nok, one of the largest known ancient Dvaravati structures, 7th–8th century CE
- Interactive map of Ayojjhapura
- 15°27′58.0″N 101°09′02.0″E
- Type: Human settlement
- Periods: Ancient history
- Cultures: Dvaravati
- Associated with: Mon people
- Location: Phetchabun province, Thailand
- Part of: Dvaravati

History
- Built: c. 300s
- Abandoned: c. 1300s

Site notes
- Area: 4.7 square kilometres (470 ha)
- Architectural styles: Dvaravati; Khmer
- Excavation dates: 1935
- Archaeologists: Damrong Rajanubhab
- Discovered: 1904
- Condition: Partial restoration
- Owner: Public
- Management: Fine Arts Department, entry fee
- Public access: Yes

Ayodhyapura or Ayojjhapura (Thai: อโยชฌปุระ RTGS: Ayotchapura or อโยชฌนคร Ayotchanakhon) was an ancient settlement in central Thailand. It existed before the 14th century (Note: The city was mentioned in the Jinakalamali during the reign of Lan Na's king Kue Na (r.1355–1385). However, previous scholars suggest it possibly was Lavo's Ayodhya.) and is mentioned in the Ratanabimbavamsa or The Chronicle of the Emerald Buddha written in Pali by Brahmarājaprajña in the 15th century and in another Pali chronicle Jinakalamali. Where it stood is disputed. It has been identified with Si Thep in present-day Phetchabun province, central Thailand.

The settlement is thought to have declined from about the middle of the 10th century, and to have been abandoned or heavily depopulated by the 13th, a collapse that Thai scholars have attributed to climate and epidemic disease. Its people are said to have moved to Lavapura and to Ayodhya, the two towns that later joined to form the Ayutthaya Kingdom.

The name outlived the place. The Jinakalamali applies Ayojjhapura to Ayutthaya itself in the Sukhothai and Ayutthaya periods, and Burmese sources sometimes call Ayutthaya Dvaravati.

== History ==
Ayodhyapura is believed to have entered a period of decline by the mid-10th century. A Khmer inscription dated to 946 CE records that the Angkorian king Rajendravarman II subdued Rāmaññadesa (lit. 'the land of the Mon') and Champa. Subsequently, in 949 CE, he appointed a member of his lineage, Vap Upendra, as governor of Rāmaññadesa.

Earlier sources, such as the Ratanabimbavamsa, recount a conflict between Ayodhyapura, under Adītaraj, and Yaśodharapura over the possession of the Emerald Buddha during the late 9th or early 10th century. Hostilities between the two may have begun much earlier. Jayavarman II established Kambujadesa and moved the capital north to Yaśodharapura in the mid-9th century. On Hiram Woodward's reading he may have allied with city-states in the Mun-Chi basin, including Wen Dan, against the power of Si Thep in the Pa Sak River basin to the west.

Ayodhyapura is believed to have been abandoned or severely depopulated around the 13th century. Several Thai scholars attribute its decline to climatic changes and widespread epidemics. Following this period of collapse, the inhabitants are thought to have sought refuge in Lavapura of Lavo (Luó hú) and Ayodhya of Xiān. These two settlements subsequently amalgamated to form the Ayutthaya Kingdom (Xiānluó hú; 暹羅斛) in the 14th century. During the Sukhothai and Ayutthaya periods, the Jinakalamali also referred to Ayutthaya as Ayojjhapura, while Burmese sources occasionally identified Ayutthaya with Dvaravati.

== Location and interpretation ==
The Ratanabimbavamsa, which mixes fact with fable and varies the story, has the Emerald Buddha brought from Pataliputra to Inthapatnakhon (อินทปัตย์นคร, Yaśodharapura) in present-day Cambodia by way of Lankadvipa (Sri Lanka). Pataliputra is today's Patna in India, although Ligor was also known by that name during the reign of Tambralinga's Chandrabhanu. It was then brought to "Ayodhyapura" before to Vajiraprakarapura (Kamphaeng Phet), Chiang Rai and Lampang. Ayodhyapura as described in the text was ruled by the great king Adītaraj (อาทิตยราช) and was said to be located on the north of Lavo's Lavapura.

ครั้งนั้น เมื่อมีพระผู้มีบารเจ้าองค์หนึ่ง ทรงพระนามว่า อาทิตราช ทรงพระปรีชาเฉลียวฉลาด อันบวรดังสุรัมมพิมารในสถานเทวโลก พระองค์ทรงอายุโยคเพื่อยุทธนาการ ได้ยกพลโยธาหารเสด็จไปถึงมหาบุรนคร จึงได้พระสัมพุทธพิมพ์อันบวรนั้น แล้วจึงจัดการบูชาเชิญพระสัมพุทธพิมพ์นั้นไว้ในอโยชฌนครอันเป็นรัมยสถาน

At that time, the meritorious king named Adītaraj, who was as marvelous as the heavenly gods, ordered to wage war and led an army to attack the great city of Mahapura (Inthapatnakhon) and obtained that excellent Buddha image (Emerald Buddha) to install in the great city of Ayodhyapura.

— Brahmarājaprajña, Ratanabimbavamsa

The Jinakalamali also mentions Ayodhyapura as a big city Mahā-nagara located in Rāmaññadesa. Its king, the greatest of all kings, had five Buddha images made from precious black stone. One was installed in Ayodhyapura, one given to Lavapura, one to Thuwunnabumi, and the other two enshrined in the far Rāmaññadesa.

...ได้ยินว่า ยังมีหินดำก้อนหนึ่ง ทางด้านฝั่งตะวันตกแม่น้ำ ไม่ไกล อโยชฌปุระ...

...Heard that there is still a black stone on the western bank of the river, not far from Ayodhyapura...

...ต่อจากนั้นมา มีพระราชาธิราชองค์หนึ่ง ในรัมมนะประเทศ เป็นใหญ่แก่เจ้าประเทศทั้งหลาย...

....After that, there was a king in Rāmañña country who was the greatest of all the kings...

...ครั้นทรงดำริอย่างนี้แล้ว จึงตรัสสั่งให้ประชุมช่างปฏิมากรรมทั้งหลาย แล้วโปรดให้ช่างทำหินก้อนนั้นให้เป็นพระพุทธรูปจำนวน 5 องค์ ครั้นทำเสร็จแล้ว องค์หนึ่งประดิษฐานอยู่ในมหานคร องค์หนึ่งอยู่ในลวปุระ องค์หนึ่งอยู่ในเมืองสุธรรม อีก 2 องค์ประดิษฐานอยู่ในรัมมนะประเทศโพ้น...

...When he had thus thought, he ordered the sculptors to gather together and had them make five Buddha images from that stone. When they were finished, one was installed in the great city (Mahā-nagara), one in Lavapura, one in the city of Sudhamma, and two were installed in the distant countries of Rammana...

— Legend of Phra Sikk̄hī Pt̩imā Silā Dảm (พระสิกขีปฏิมาศิลาดำ) in Jinakalamali

As per the location given in the text, Thai scholar Pensupa Sukkata speculated that Ayodhyapura is potentially the present-Si Thep, the early center of the Dvaravati civilization, which flourished from the 6th to 11th century. Haripuñjaya Study scholar, Akrin Phongphanthacha, agrees with the mentioned theory and additionally asserts that:

...It is possible that Sri Thep city is an old Ayutthaya Sri Dvaravati, with Lavapura (Lavo) as a secondary city or southern fortress. Si Thep City is situated at the headwaters of the Pa Sak River. It is a place abundant in natural resources. It is believed that mineral and forest goods were transported from the Pa Sak River to Lavapura. Until the 6th to 9th centuries, demand for Si Thep forest products may have diminished or there could have been an outbreak in Si Thep, leaving the city abandoned during the period when Khmer influence began to take hold. As a result, the center of Dvaravati's prosperity shifted to the lower basin. When Ayutthaya Kingdom gradually built itself up and became stronger, separating from Lavo, some of the population was old Lavo, mixed with old Ayutthaya (which used to be in Sri Thep), and probably brought the name ‘Ayutthaya Sri Dvaravati’ or ‘Dvaravati Sri Ayutthaya’ back to use with the new city-state again for good fortune...”

— Akrin Phongphanthacha

Two other readings have been proposed. Some interpretations place the city in present-day northern Thailand, although its precise location remains indeterminate. Others identify it with Lavapura, the principal urban center of Lavo, an identification generally regarded as the least plausible, since the text itself treats the two as distinct and separate places.
