= Bhagadatta (of Chanasa) =

A king Bhagadatta is reported in a Khmer inscription dated 937 as the spring of a line of princes of Canasapura in Dvaravati in what is now Thailand.

== Bibliography ==
- Coedès, G. (1968), The Indianized States of Southeast Asia, Honolulu: University of Hawaii Press
