= Si Thep Historical Park =

Archaeological site in Thailand

Coordinates: 15°27′58″N 101°09′02″E

- อุทยานประวัติศาสตร์ศรีเทพ (Thai)
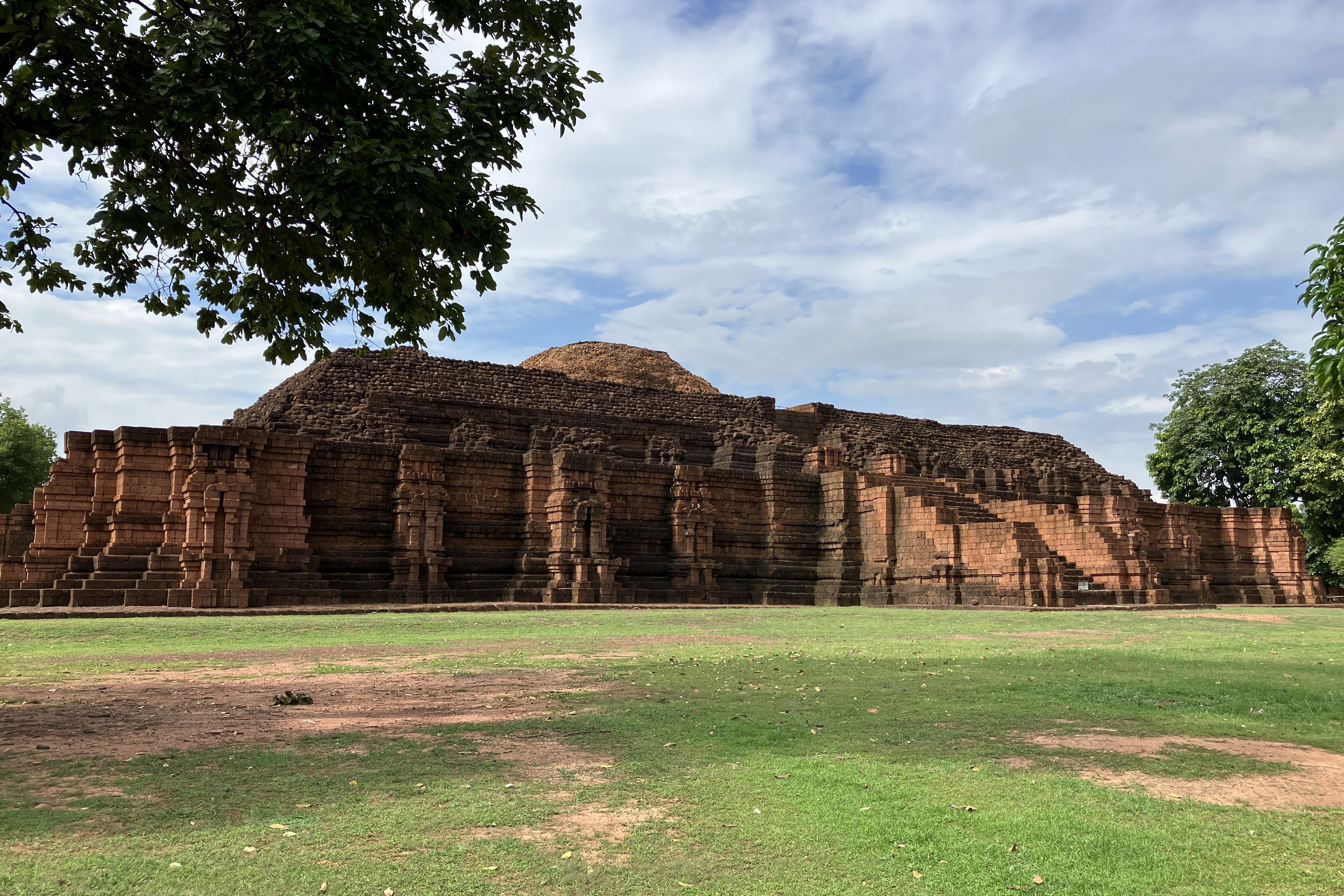
- Khao Khlang Nok, one of the largest known ancient Dvaravati structures, 7th–8th century CE
- Interactive map of Si Thep Historical Park
- Type: Human settlement
- Periods: Ancient history
- Cultures: Dvaravati
- Associated with: Mon people, Hinduism, Buddhism (Theravada, Mahayana)
- Location: Phetchabun province, Thailand

History
- Built: 4th century
- Abandoned: 14th century

Site notes
- Area: 4.7 square kilometres (470 ha)
- Architectural styles: Dvaravati; Khmer
- Excavation dates: 1935
- Archaeologists: Damrong Rajanubhab
- Discovered: 1904
- Condition: Partial restoration
- Owner: Public
- Management: Fine Arts Department, entry fee
- Public access: Yes

UNESCO World Heritage Site
- Official name: The Ancient Town of Si Thep and Its Associated Dvaravati Monuments
- Type: Cultural
- Criteria: ii, iii
- Designated: 2023 (45th session)
- Reference no.: 1662
- Area: 866.471 ha
- Region: Asia and the Pacific

Historical affiliations

Qian Zhi Fu 6th–7th centuries
Ge Luo She Fen 8th–9th centuries
Khmer Empire 10th–13th centuries
Kingdom of Ayutthaya 1351–1767
Kingdom of Thonburi 1767–1782
Kingdom of Siam 1782–1932
Kingdom of Thailand 1932–present

Si Thep Historical Park (Thai: อุทยานประวัติศาสตร์ศรีเทพ) is an archaeological site in Thailand's Phetchabun province. It covers the ancient city of Si Thep, inhabited from about the third to fifth century CE until the thirteenth. Its cultural periods run from late prehistory through the Dvaravati period to the golden age of the Khmer Empire. Si Thep was one of the largest known city-states of the central Thai plains in the first millennium. It was abandoned about the time the Thai-speaking cities of Sukhothai and later Ayutthaya rose as new centres of power in the Chao Phraya River basin.

The site gained the attention of modern archaeology in 1904 following surveys by Prince Damrong Rajanubhab, and it was listed as an ancient monument in 1935. The Fine Arts Department has undertaken continued study and excavations of the site, which has also been studied by archaeologists Prince Subhadradis Diskul, H. G. Quaritch Wales and Jean Boisselier, among others. Several ancient polities named in Chinese records, in inscriptions and in the Pali chronicles have been identified with the site, none of the identifications being settled.

Si Thep was listed as a historical park in 1984 and was proposed as a tentative UNESCO World Heritage Site by Thailand in 2019. On 19 September 2023, it was inscribed on the World Heritage List as The Ancient Town of Si Thep and Its Associated Dvaravati Monuments. It is Thailand's first successful cultural World Heritage Site nomination since Ban Chiang in 1992.

== History ==
=== Early settlement: 4th–5th century CE ===
Si Thep was developed from a prehistoric farming village in the Pa Sak valley approximately 2,500–1,500 years ago. In the first archaeological phase (c. 4th–5th century CE), the early settlement of Si Thep occupied the inner town and there was a burial tradition with offerings related to India and communities to the central region and Moon River basin to the northeast.

Excavation has given the phase absolute dates. A burial group near the centre of the circular moated town, opened in 2016, held five human skeletons, a dog, pots, iron tools, a spindle whorl and two agate pendants. A tooth from a male of 25 to 35 returned a radiocarbon age of 1,730 ± 30 BP, or 240–390 CE. Thermoluminescence dates the circular moat to 414–602 and a ruin inside the rectangular extension east of it to 505–681. Suriya Sudsawat, who reports the results, states that there is no evidence whether the people who used the burial ground and those who laid out the town were the same.

=== Hindu-influenced era: 6th–8th century CE ===
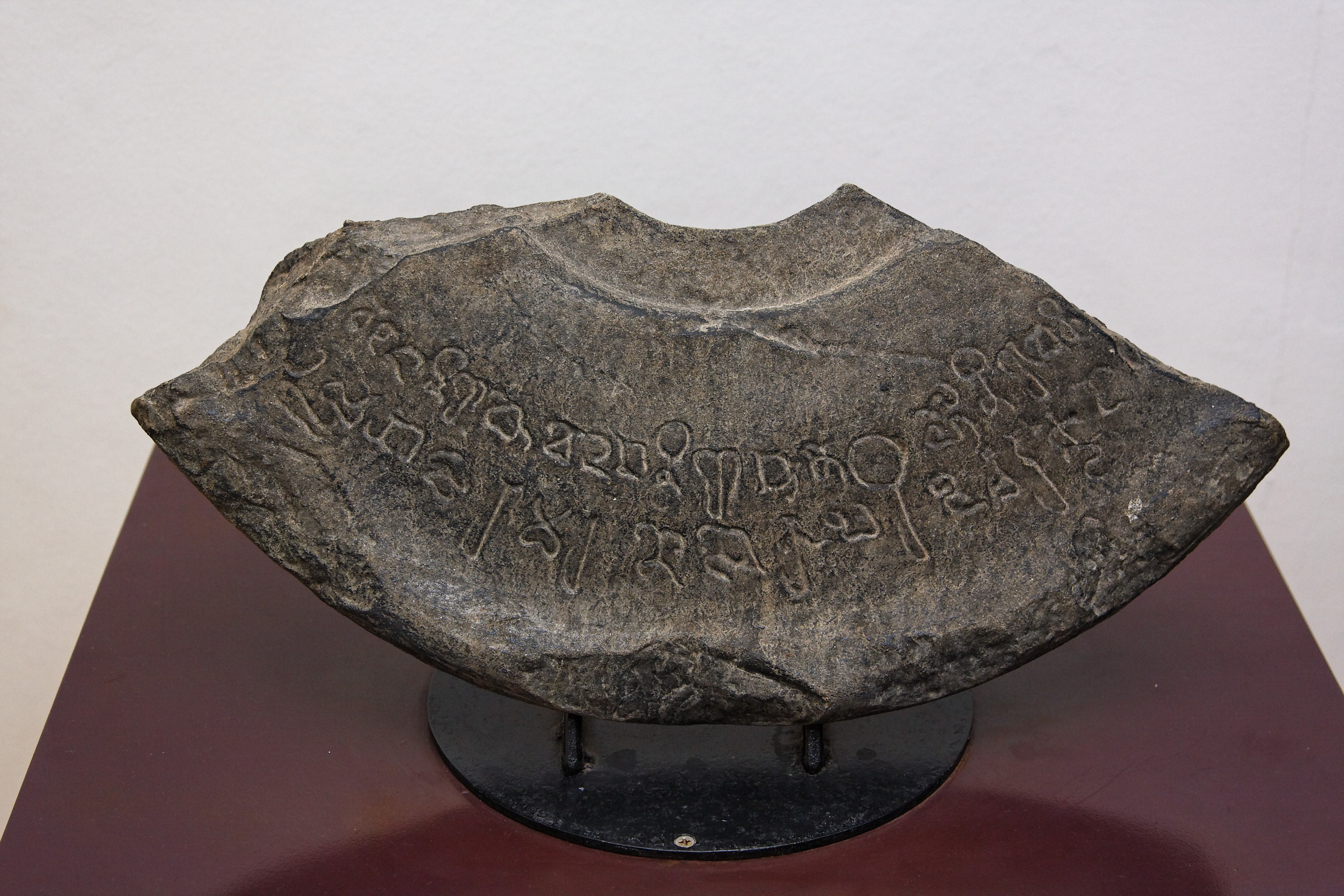
Inscribed sculpture base from Si Thep, 8th century CE, featuring Pallava script in Pali language.

The second phase of occupation (c. 6th–8th century CE) was characterized by the expansion to the outer city. As the monarchy emerged, Vaishnavism took an important role in Si Thep's society, with relationships to India, Funan, Chenla, and Dvaravati cultures. Si Thep was an urban Dvaravati centre from the 6th century CE and one of the earliest communities in Thailand to make contact with India. The evidence given is stone inscription K 978, written in Sanskrit in Pallava script and dated to the 6th century. So, Si Thep was developed into an early state along with other early Southeast Asian states like Funan, Chenla, and Sri Ksetra.

Charles Higham reports a 7th-century Dvaravati inscription from Si Thep. It reads, "In the year...a king who is nephew of the great King, who is the son of Pruthiveenadravarman, and who is great as Bhavavarman, who has renowned moral principles, who is powerful and the terror of his enemies, erects this inscription on ascending the throne." A moat enclosed 4.7 square kilometres. The Khao Khlang Nai structure (Thai: เขาคลังใน) dates from the 6th to 7th century.

Two images of Kṛṣṇa Govardhanadhāra were found at the site, dated to about the late sixth and the late seventh century. Statues of the Buddha and of Kṛṣṇa Govardhanadhāra have likewise been found close together in the Angkor Borei and Phnom Da region of southern Cambodia. The inscription K. 499 from Si Thep, one of the oldest Sanskrit stone inscriptions from Thailand, records puṇya, or meritorious work, in a Brahmanical setting.

The Vaiṣṇava sculpture of this phase places Si Thep within a network of centres producing standing, four-armed, mitred images of Viṣṇu. That network extended from Arakan and the Thai peninsula through central and northeastern Thailand to southern Laos, Champa and the Mekong delta, and as far as western Java, Bangka and Bali. Paul Lavy and Wesley Clarke identify a technical peculiarity of the Si Thep workshops. Whereas almost all early Southeast Asian stone sculpture retains reserve supports of uncarved stone to brace the limbs, a number of Si Thep pieces dispense with them.

Sculpture attributed to the site includes a mitred Viṣṇu head in the Honolulu Museum of Art. Two embossed gold plaques showing Viṣṇu, in the Norton Simon Museum and the Cleveland Museum of Art, are both assigned to the late 7th or early 8th century. A further Hindu image in the Norton Simon Museum carries a floriated gem on its octagonal mitre, unlike 7th-century Si Thep work and close to Angkorian carving. Woodward reads it as a further indication of contact with the Angkor region. Suriya Sudsawat notes that of two Viṣṇu, two Kṛṣṇa Govardhana and seven Sūrya attributed to Si Thep, only one Sūrya has a recorded find-spot. The standing Buddha in the Norton Simon Museum is only reported to come from the town.

A quadrangular pillar found beside the western moat of the inner city in 1998 carries an inscription in śaṅkhalipi, the ornate Indian shell script. Richard Salomon and Nicolas Revire report it as the fifth specimen known outside India and the first from mainland Southeast Asia. The Fine Arts Department had published it as a pillar with carved decoration, and Revire recognised the script only in 2013. It is inscribed on all four faces, the flourishes of its main characters running from the front around the sides, a layout no Indian specimen shares. The text is undeciphered and carries no date. A floral mark dividing it matches one on an inscribed pillar from Sap Champa in Lopburi province, which its script places in the seventh or eighth century. Salomon and Revire say the parallel may tentatively put the two in the same period, but add that the mark is common throughout the first millennium.

=== Buddhism-influenced era: 8th–10th century CE ===
==== Growth and monuments ====
This phase (c. 8th–10th century CE) was the most prosperous. An irrigation system was developed, and Mahayana Buddhism influenced art as relationships with India, Dvaravati and northeastern cities continued. Si Thep, Sema, and Lopburi sites controlled the routes in the region. The growth of Si Thep led to the founding of Tha Rong (Thai: ท่าโรง), 20 kilometres north on the Pasak River and later renamed Wichian Buri.

Hiram Woodward has argued that Si Thep was a significant city of Wen Dan, a group of Dvaravati-influenced political entities in present-day Northeast Thailand, although he does not maintain that the geographical evidence identifies it as Wen Dan's capital. He reads the largest monument at the site as evidence of contact with the Angkor region in the first quarter of the 8th century. The Fine Arts Department excavated the mound of Khao Khlang Nok in 2008. It proved to be a laterite terraced stupa 64 metres on each face, with a stair at the centre of each of the four axes and a brick stupa dome at the summit. Projecting false niches, or edifice representations, run around its base. Santi Leksukhum compared these with the base of Trapeang Phong S2 at Roluos, and their design and proportions resemble those of the temple of Preah Theat Kvan Pir in Kratie, dated by inscription to 716. Since edifice representations are not otherwise a feature of Dvaravati architecture, and 7th-century Cambodian examples are broader in proportion, Woodward treats the resemblance as evidence of contact rather than of inheritance.

Suriya Sudsawat gives the mound as 20 m high, with four laterite-brick subsidiary stūpas on the axes carrying floral stucco and a place prepared for a dharmacakra. A sandstone standing Buddha was found in situ at the lower level. Thermoluminescence dates the subsidiary stūpas to between 270 and 610, the north and east faces of the main mound to 720–848 and 821–875, and the area of the dharmacakra base to 542–726. No brick sample of the main mound's first construction was available, so its date is unknown.

Pongsak Nillavorn compares the same feature with the edifice representations on the subsidiary towers at Sambor Prei Kuk. He describes a rolled leaf motif, the jutting leaf, running along the Khao Khlang Nok niches and supporting the fascia above them, as it does at that site.

==== Foreign contacts ====
Two finds indicate contact with China in the same period. The first is the relief carvings in Thamorat Cave, fifteen kilometres west of Si Thep, whose central pillar is not found at other Buddhist cave sites in Thailand and points to knowledge of Chinese cave-sanctuary plans. The second is a fragment of a votive plaque recovered at Si Thep with the name of a Chinese monk inscribed on the reverse. Woodward places these later than the stupa and takes them to indicate the presence of a Chinese visitor around the time of Wen Dan's tribute missions of 753 and 771. Talbot, on Brown, takes the cave sculptures as Prakhon Chai bronze image types translated into relief, and links those images to Si Thep, on a route joining the Mekong and Mun rivers to the Chao Phraya valley.

The name on the plaque has been read as Wen-Tong or Wen-Xiang. Three clay sealings from the Khlang Nai stūpa each carry the name of a Chinese monk, read as Wenxiang and impressed before firing. They have been placed in the eighth century. In Saritpong Khunsong's compositional analysis of glass beads from ten Dvaravati sites, Si Thep produced the sample's only bead of mineral-soda calcium glass, assigned to the Levant or Egypt. It also yielded one of five lead-glass beads treated as diagnostic of Chinese production, and one potash-glass bead whose source may be Indian, Vietnamese or Chinese. He groups Si Thep with Khit Khin in Saraburi province and Phrom Thin Tai in Lopburi province as inland sites, and reads their imported beads as exchange within the plain alongside the overseas trade.

==== Later settlement ====
Writing in 2010, Woodward noted the absence of remains at Si Thep clearly datable to the 9th century. He set this beside the coincidence of Wen Dan's last embassy to China with Jayavarman II's accession in 802, and suggested that Jayavarman II had defeated Wen Dan. Baker and Pasuk give the same period differently. They rank Si Thep as probably the second largest town of the Chao Phraya plain, occupied from the 6th century and enlarged many times. When many towns founded in that century declined or were abandoned from the late 9th, Si Thep and Nakhon Pathom were on their account among the few enlarged instead. They also describe Buddhism at the site as coexisting with the worship of the Hindu sun god.

On one account Si Thep and Lavo were together the centre of the mandala-style state of Dvaravati. Weather-induced migration or epidemic then cost Si Thep its prosperity, Lavo became the only centre of power in the area, and Lavo passed under Angkorian control in the 10th or 11th century.

==== Wheels of the law ====
Wheels of the law of the Dvaravati period are recorded from Si Thep, several of them held in the Ramkhamhaeng National Museum in Sukhothai. Eng Jin Ooi and Peter Skilling use them as comparanda for a wheel found in Chai Nat in 1988. On the Si Thep wheels the felloe between the bands of pearls is flat and filled with pattern; on the Chai Nat wheel it is plain and carries the inscription.

A complete wheel in the Newark Museum in New Jersey has been attributed to Si Thep by Robert Brown, on stylistic comparison with other wheels from the site. Ooi and Skilling report that it is not clear whether anything beyond that hypothesis supports the provenance. They record a further Si Thep wheel in a private collection. Reading the Newark wheel from photographs, they differ from Brown's published text at points of spelling.

=== Angkorian-influenced period: 11th–13th century CE ===
During this phase (c. 11th–13th century CE) Shaivism was a strong influence at Si Thep, and the site is held to have had relations with Phimai in the Mun River basin as Sema ceased to control the routes. Anurak Depimai attributes the site's loss of importance, and its near abandonment around the 14th century, to Jayavarman VII's policy. Prang Song Phi Nong and Prang Si Thep were built in the 11th to 12th centuries. On another account it appears to have been abandoned by the 13th century, coinciding with the rise of Sukhothai as the new political centre of the upper Menam Valley.

An inscription from Nong Mai So, 12 km north of the town, is in Khmer script and language and of the 10th or 11th century. It names a Khmer officer and a female servant, from which Suriya Sudsawat concludes only that Khmer speakers were present in the area. Reviewing the Khmer-style material of the 10th to 13th centuries at the town, he leaves open whether it reflects Khmer political power or only the influence of Khmer art styles.

=== Post Angkorian period: after the 13th century ===
After the decline of Si Thep in the 13th century, Ayutthaya was founded to the south, on the bank of the Chao Phraya River, in the mid-14th century, and has been described as its successor state. Its capital's full name, Krung Thep Dvaravati Si Ayutthaya (Thai: กรุงเทพทวารวดีศรีอยุธยา), refers to the mandalas of Dvaravati.

== Identification with ancient polities ==
Si Thep has been proposed as a centre of the Dvaravati mandalas. Through royal intermarriage it has also been treated as the sister city of Sema, the capital of the neighboring state, Canasapura, located eastward on the opposite side of the Dong Phaya Yen Mountains in the Mun River basin. Some scholars believe Si Thep was Ayojjhapura, the predecessor to Ayodhya, mentioned in the Pali chronicles Ratanabimbavamsa and Jinakalamali.

Tatsuo Hoshino suggests that Si Thep was a chief centre of the Qiān Zhī Fú Kingdom, whose territory at Canasapura's Mueang Sema was lost to the coastal-dominated Dvaravati from the Bang Pakong Basin. He treats Qian/Gan Zhi Fu as a pre-Angkorian name for Si Thep, and identifies the same polity with the Śrī Canāśapura of the inscriptions. The New Book of Tang assigns Śrī Canāśapura 20,000 warriors, and 40,000 together with Xiū Luó Fēn. Si Thep is also his preferred candidate for the seat of Cān Bàn. He notes that Si Thep lies south-west of Fa Daet where the Chinese records require a position to the north-west, and places the seat further up the Pasak valley.

Claude Jacques proposed in 2009 that Si Thep was Dvāravatī itself. His ground is the site's early cult of Viṣṇu, and in particular of Kṛṣṇa, whose legendary capital in Indian literature bears that name. Nicolas Revire sets the proposal beside Hiram Woodward's, which reads Sukhothai inscription 2 as pointing to Nakhon Pathom instead. Piriya Krairiksh argued for the same identification in 2023. He gives two grounds, that Si Thep is the only site in Thailand at which an image of Kṛṣṇa has been found, and that Dvaravati was principally Brahmanical where Nakhon Pathom and U Thong were Buddhist.

== Extant structures ==
=== Within the inner city ===
- Khao Khlang Nai (Thai: เขาคลังใน)
- Prang Si Thep (Thai: ปรางค์ศรีเทพ)
- Prang Song Phi Nong (Thai: ปรางค์สองพี่น้อง)

=== Outside the inner city ===
- Khao Khlang Nok (Thai: เขาคลังนอก)
- Khao Khlang Na (Thai: เขาคลังหน้า)
- Khao Khlang Sa Kaeo (Thai: เขาคลังสระแก้ว)
- Prang Ruesi (Thai: ปรางค์ฤๅษี)

== Gallery ==
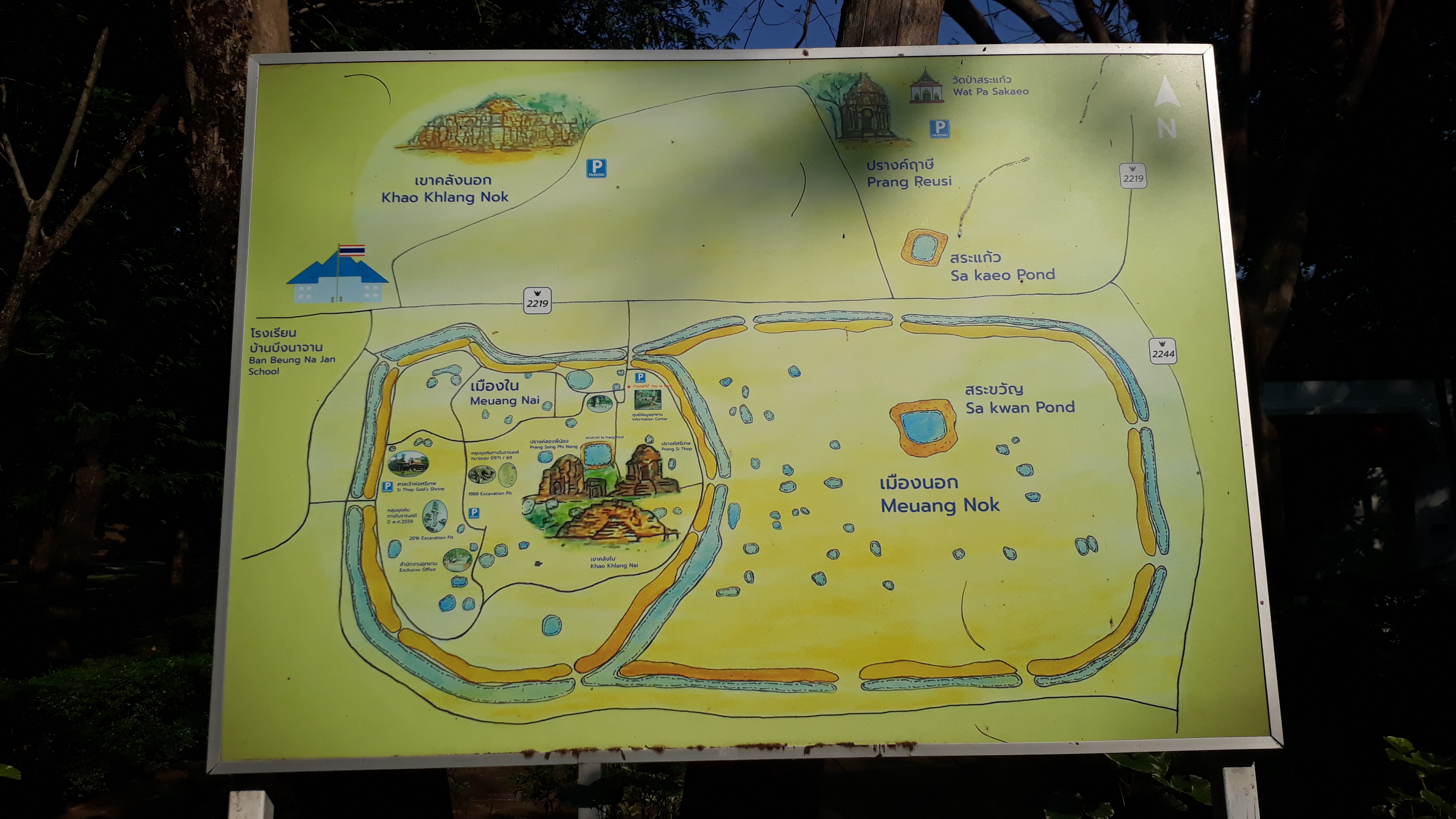
Map of Si Thep Historical Park

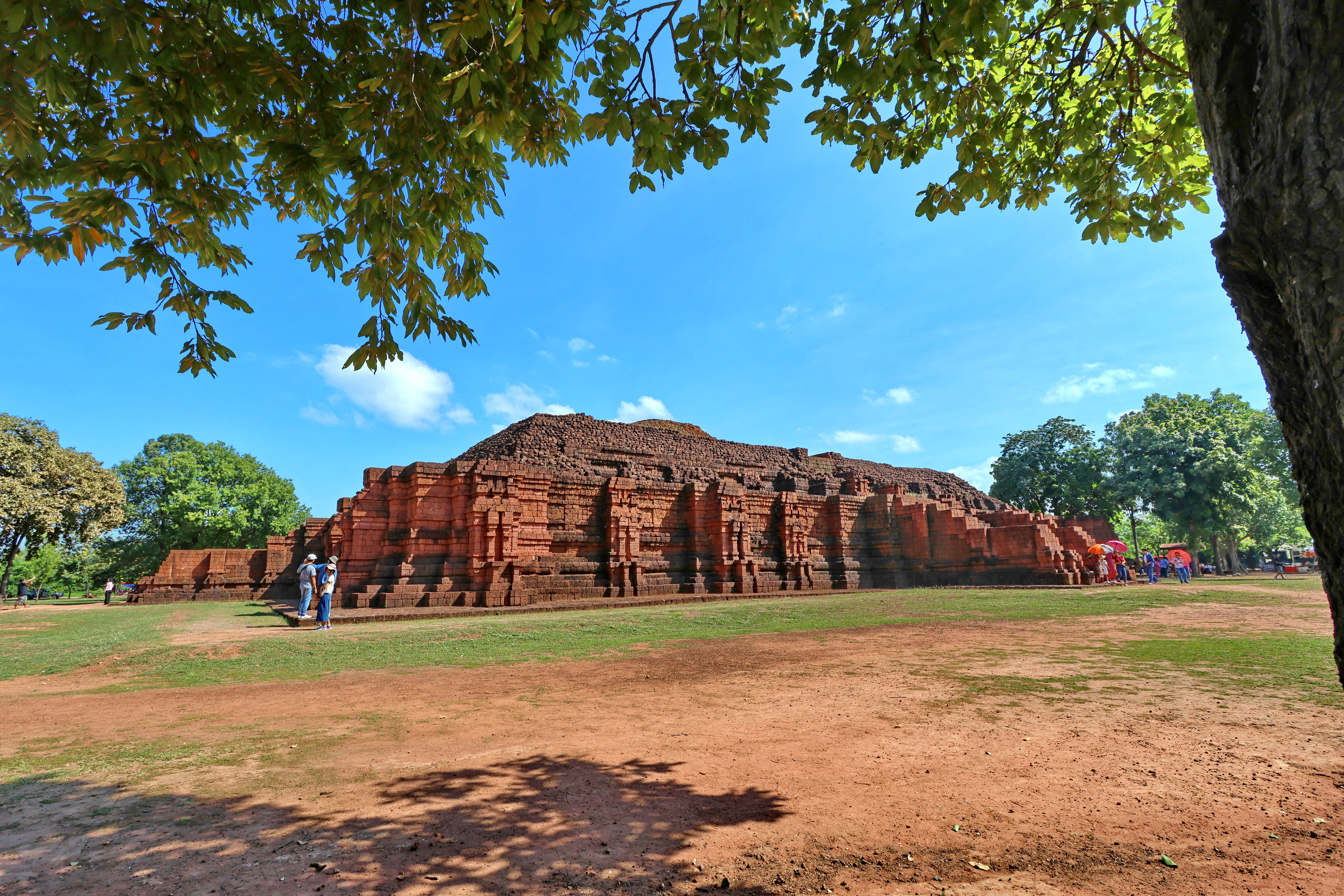
Khao Khlang Nok, the largest ancient monument in Si Thep.

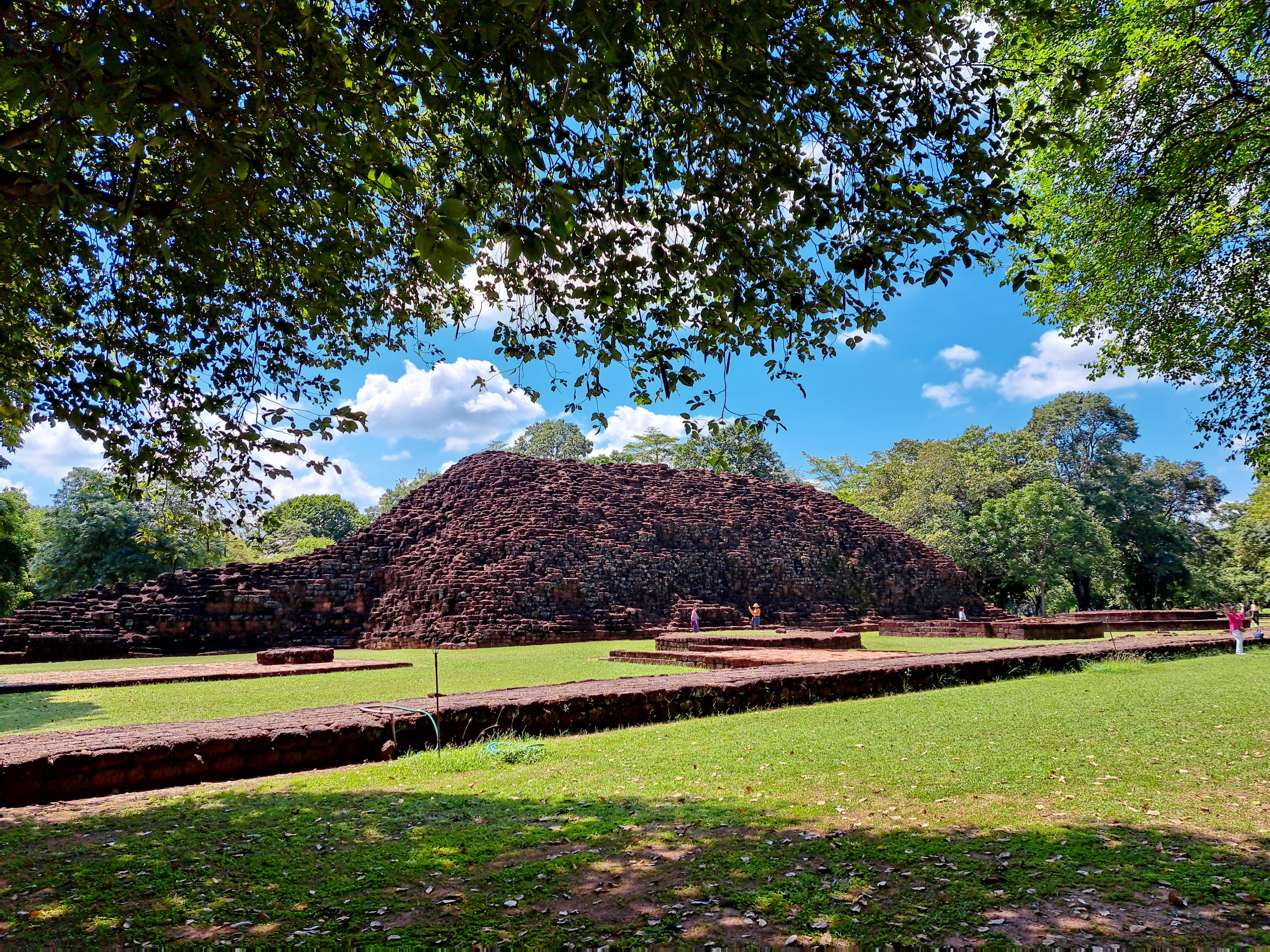
Khao Khlang Nai was a Buddhist sanctuary. The central stupa, rectangular in shape and oriented toward the east, is characteristic of the Dvaravati architectural style, dated back around 6th–7th century CE.

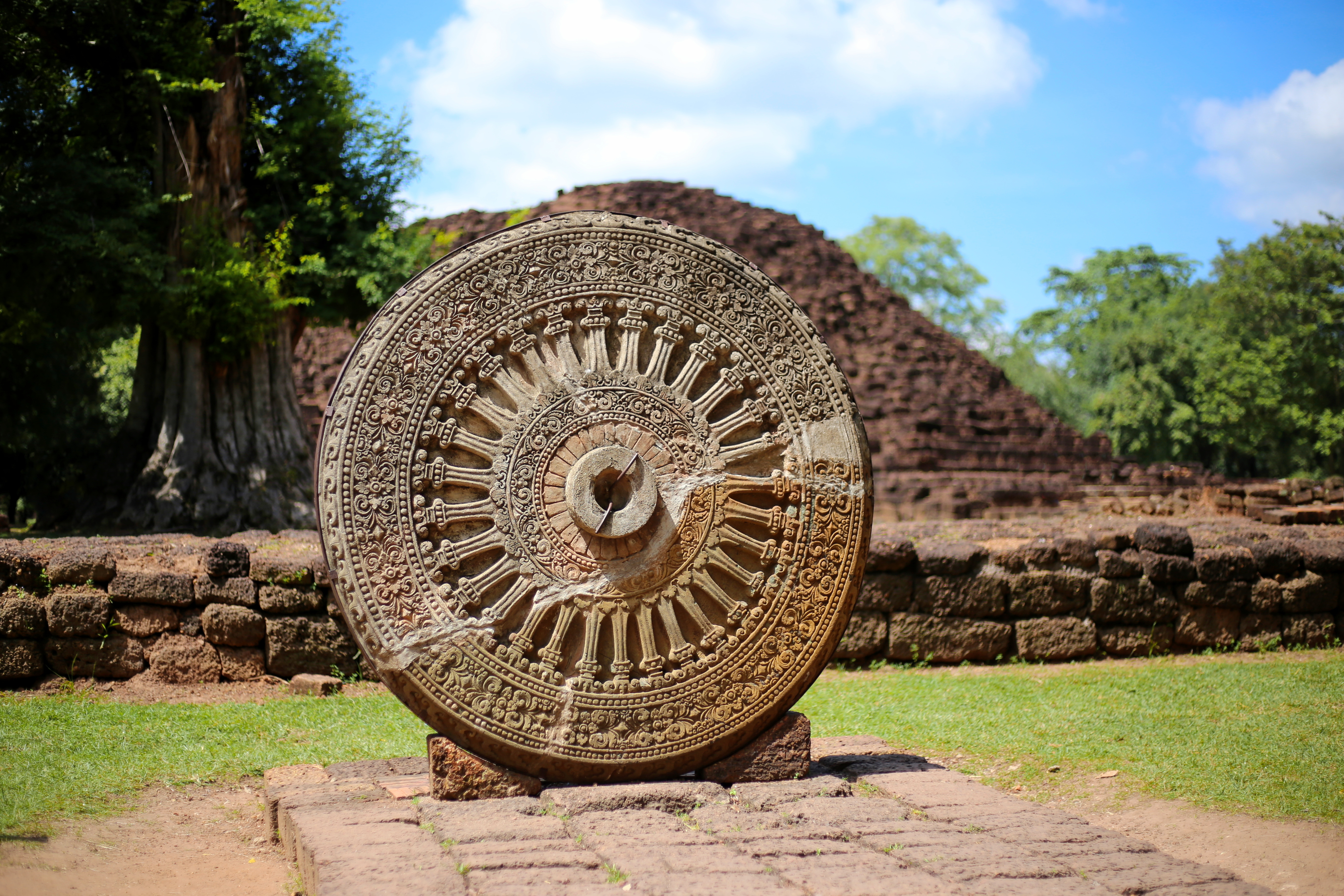
A meticulously carved Dvaravati-style Dharmachakra discovered at Si Thep, with Khao Khlang Nai stupa in the background.

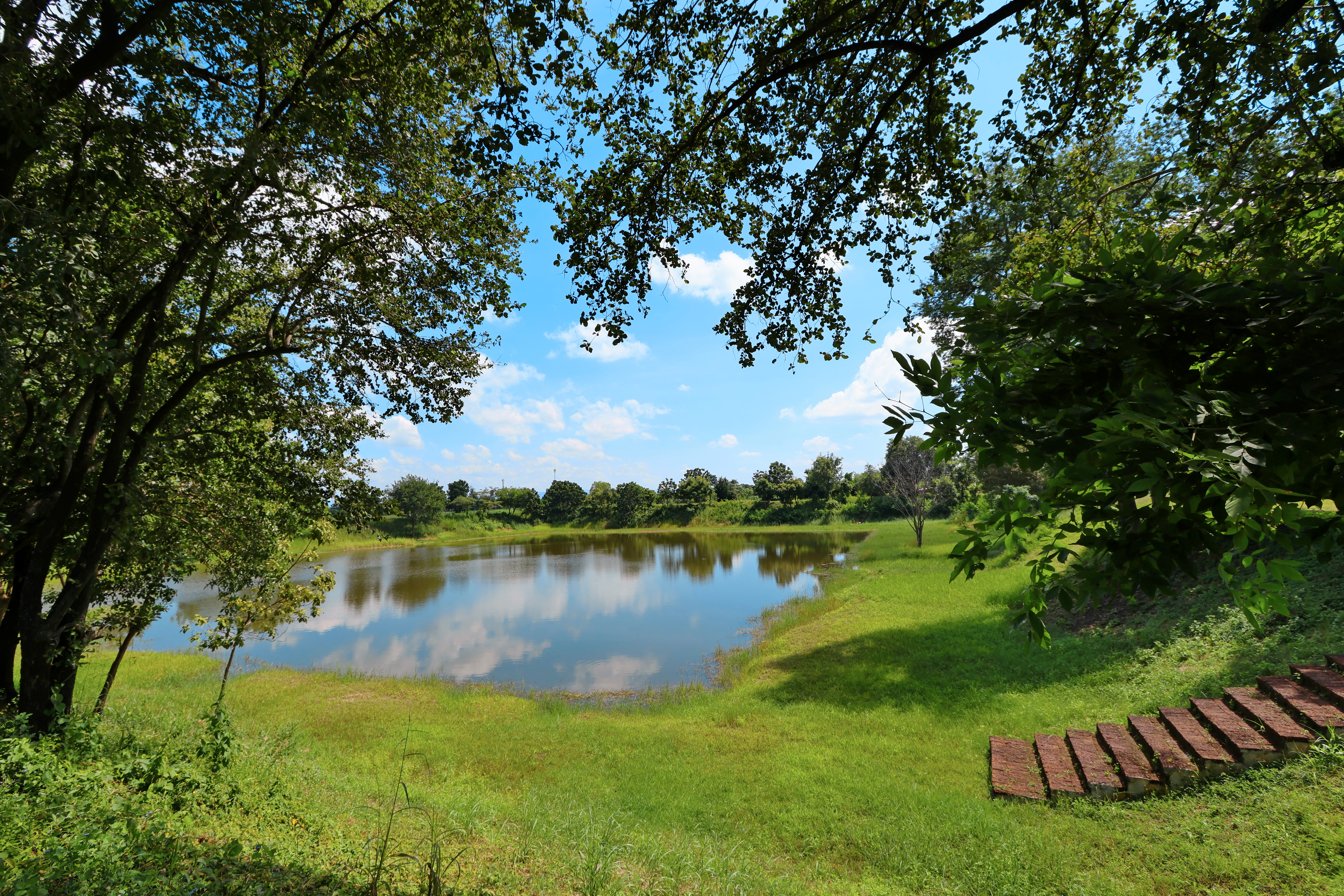
Sa Kaeo, a large ancient pond located to the north of the ancient city of Si Thep.

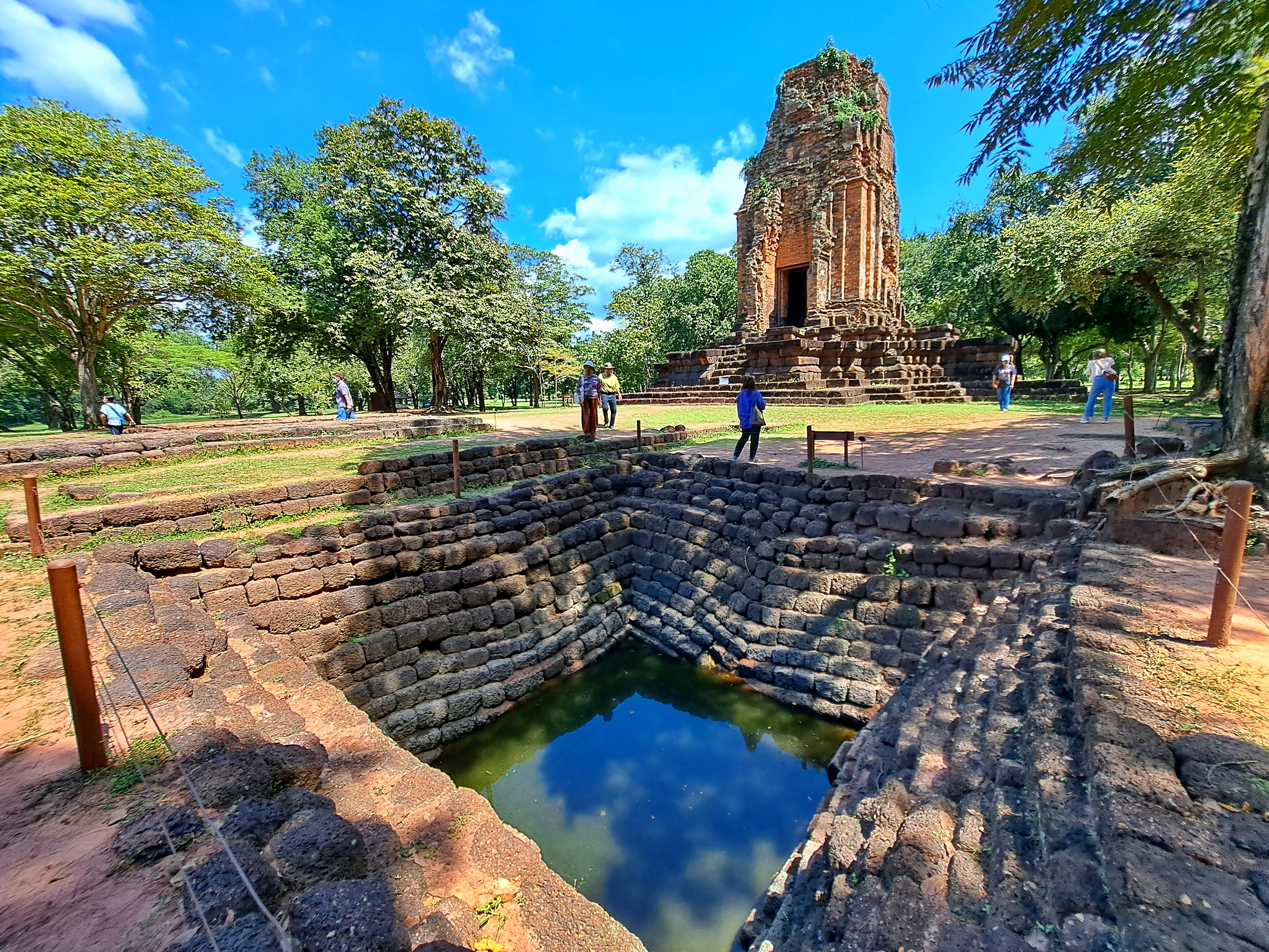
The ruins of Prang Si Thep and an ancient stone pond within the inner city of Si Thep Historical Park.

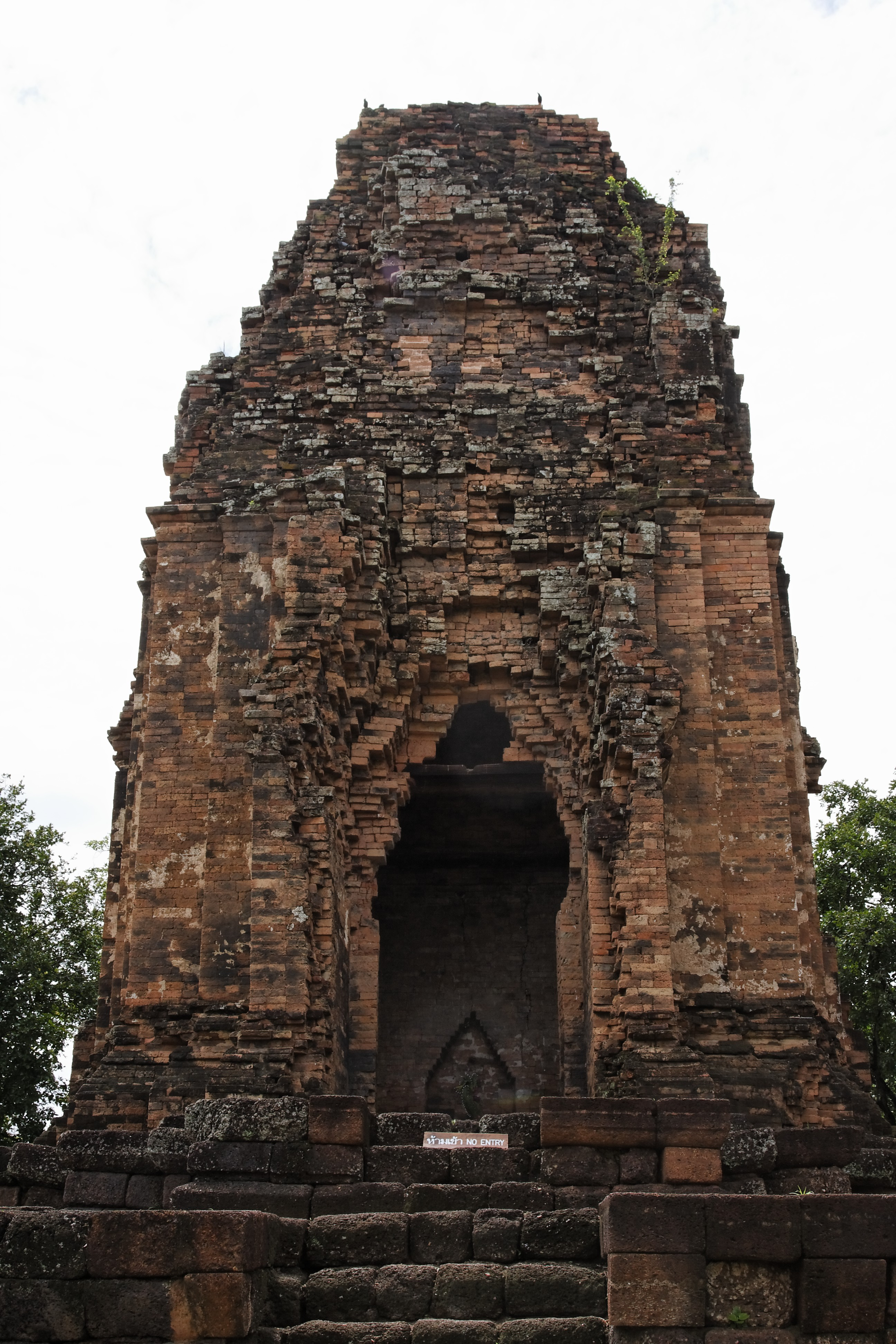
Prang Si Thep

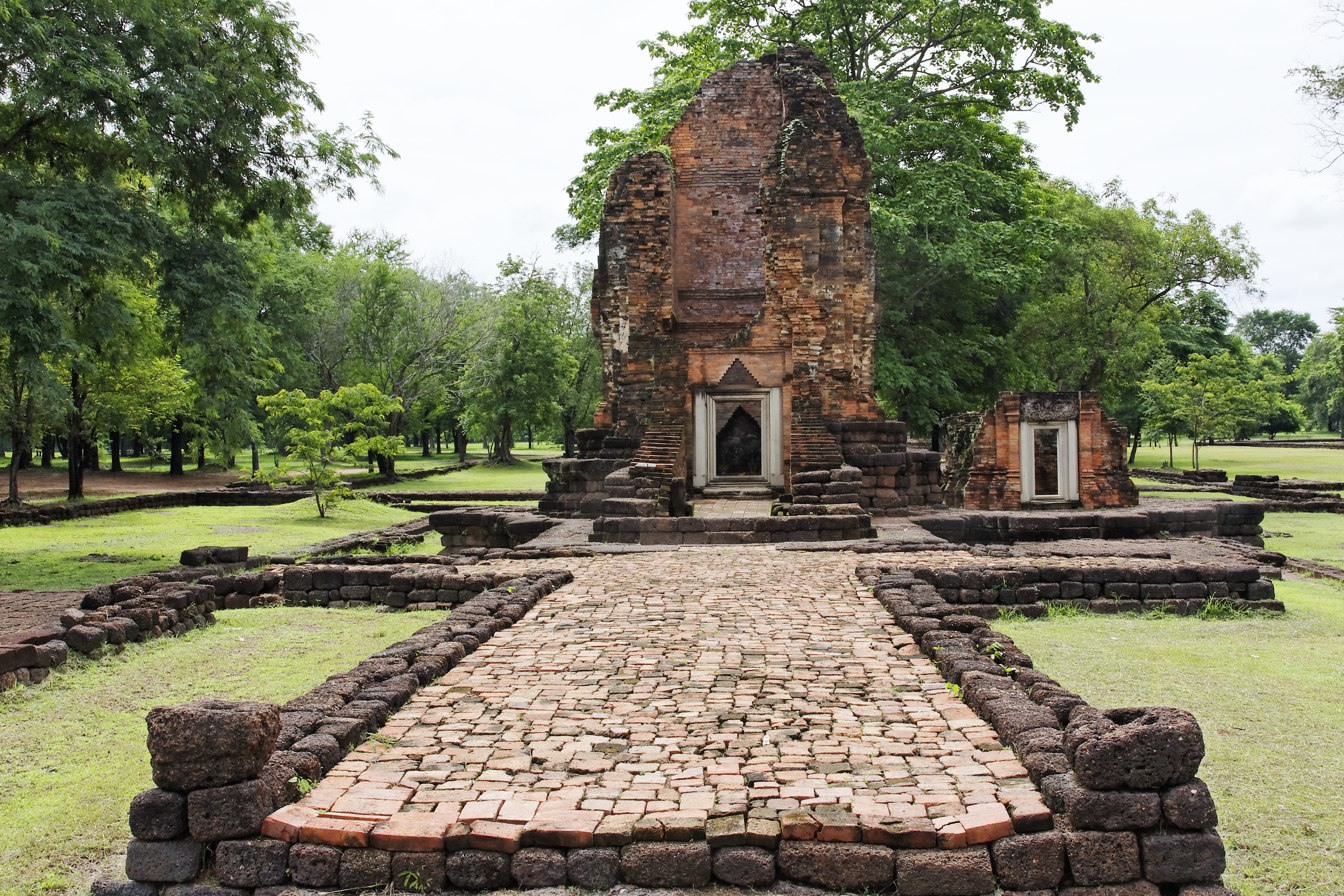
Prang Song Phi Nong

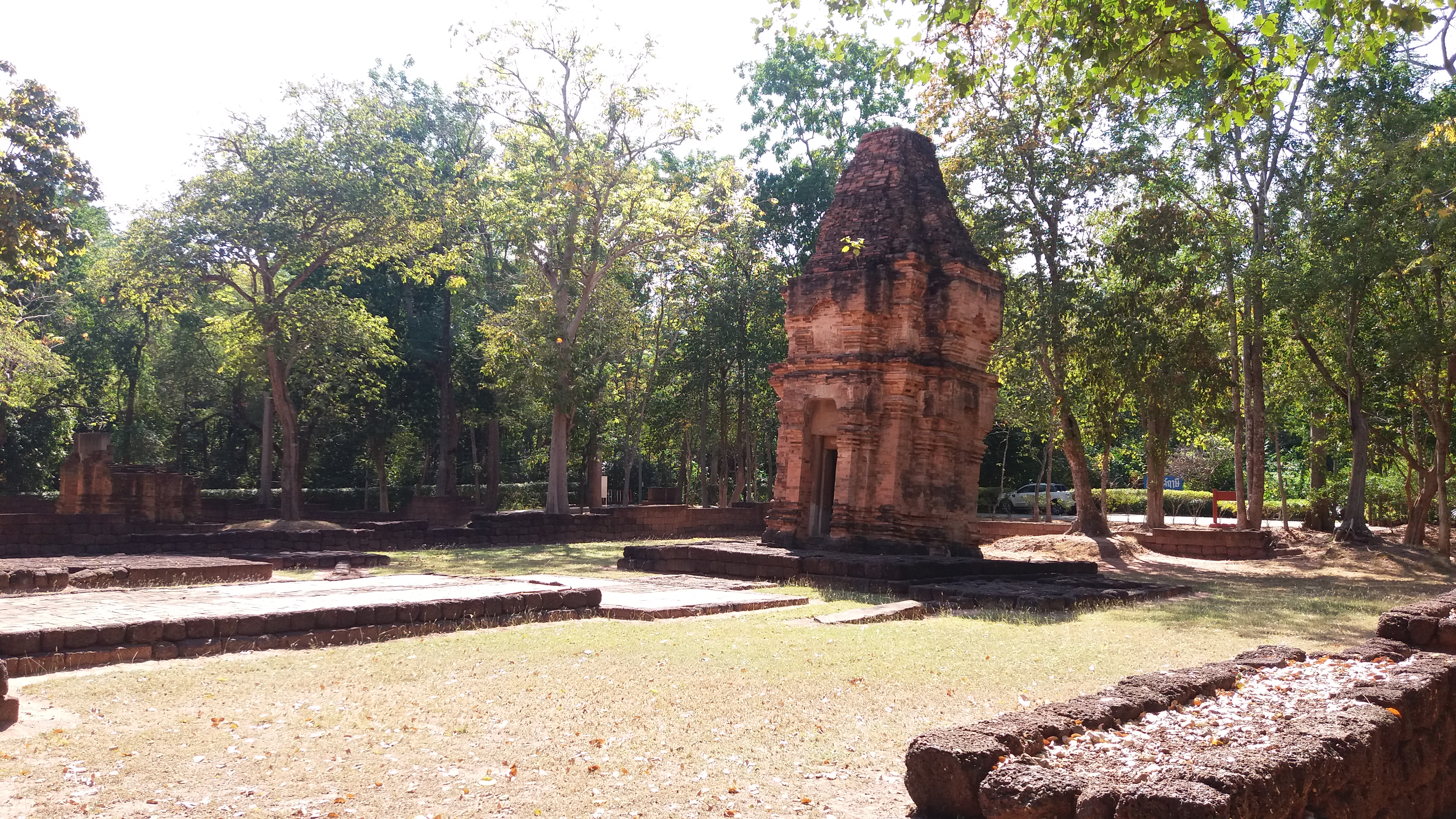
Prang Ruesi

== See also ==
- Dvaravati art
- History of Thailand
- List of World Heritage Sites in Thailand
