= Adītaraj =

Legendary ruler in the Emerald Buddha chronicle

Ruler of Ayojjhapura

Adītaraj (Thai: อาทิตยราช) is a legendary ruler of Ayojjhapura mentioned in the Ratanabimbavamsa, a chronicle of the Emerald Buddha. According to the chronicle, he brought the Emerald Buddha from Inthapatnakhon to Ayojjhapura after a flood struck the former city.

== Chronicle account ==
The Ratanabimbavaṃsa describes Adītaraj as the ruler of Ayojjhapura, a city north of Lavo. It states that the Emerald Buddha had previously been kept at Inthapatnakhon, where it was worshipped by several generations of rulers.

According to the chronicle, during the reign of King Senakarāja of Inthapatnakhon, a prince kept a fly as a pet. The son of the king's religious adviser kept a spider, which ate the prince's fly. Senakarāja ordered the adviser's son to be drowned. A naga living in the pond became angry and caused a flood that destroyed much of the city. A Buddhist monk then took the Emerald Buddha onto a boat and fled northward with other survivors.

After hearing about the flood, Adītaraj travelled to Inthapatnakhon with an army because he feared that the Emerald Buddha had been lost. He found the image and brought it back to Ayojjhapura, together with a group of people who had accompanied it. The chronicle states that Adītaraj ordered a celebration after obtaining the Emerald Buddha. People brought gold, silver, flowers, incense, and other offerings. The celebration lasted one month, after which the image was placed in a temple. Adītaraj continued to worship the image during his reign.

According to another account, King Adītaraj moved from Lavo back to Ayodhya around 1042 CE, although the account is unclear.
