= Dvaravati =

7th to 11th-century Mon kingdom

Dvaravati Kingdom
- 7th–11th century
- The Dvaravati Kingdom and contemporary Asian polities, circa 800.

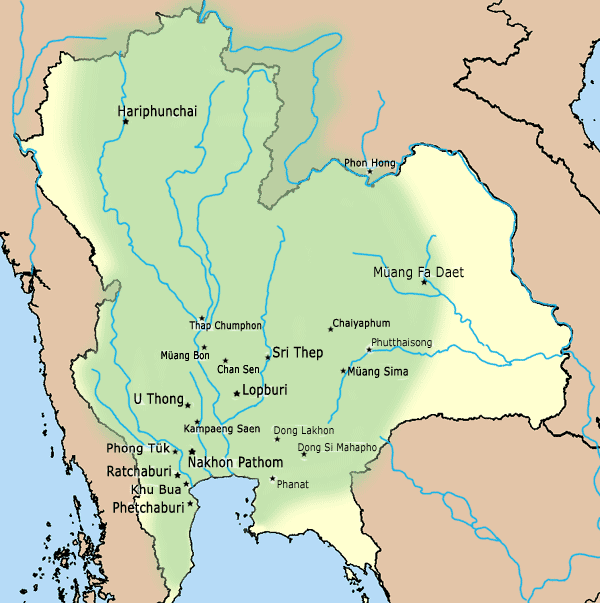
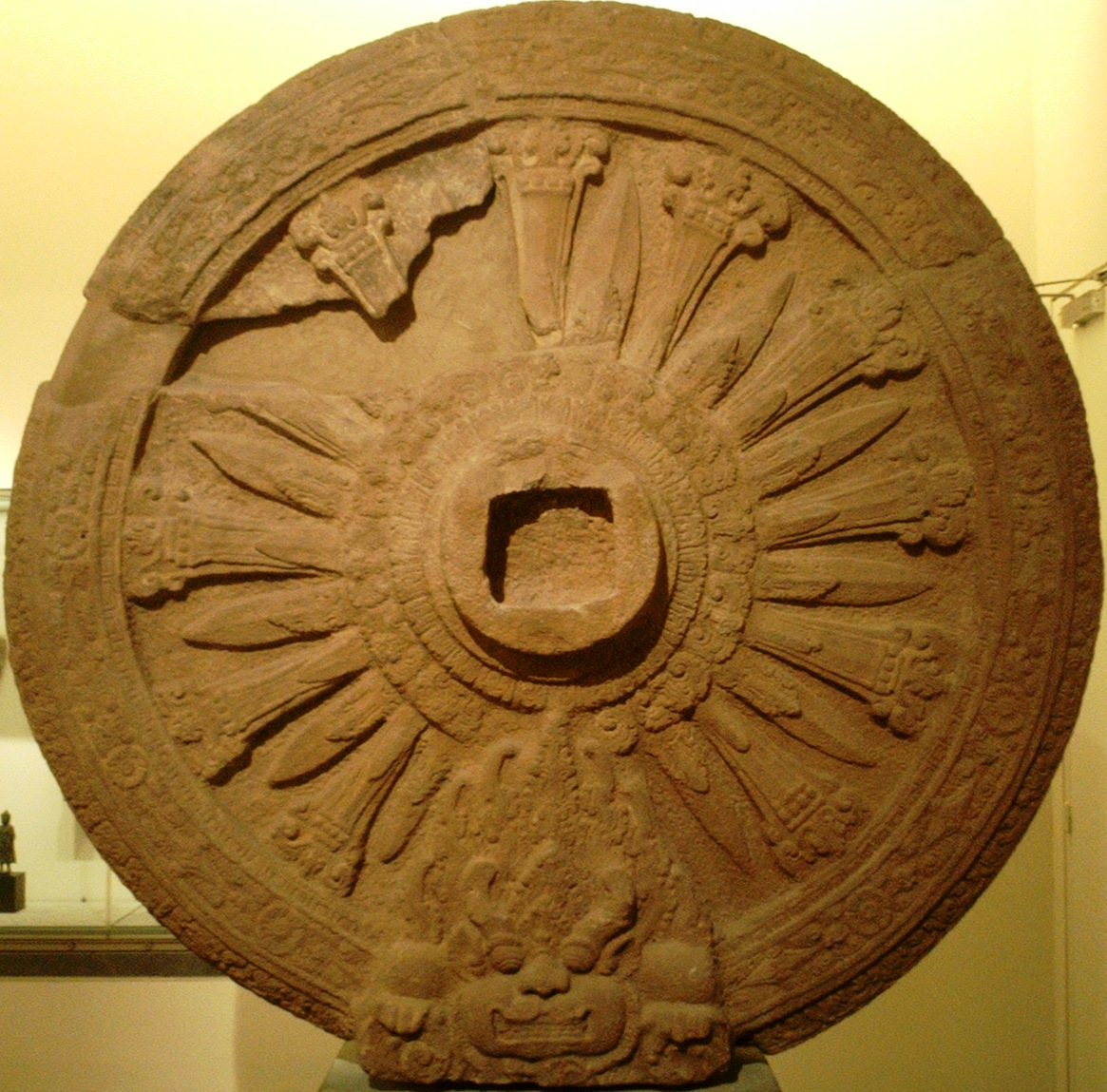
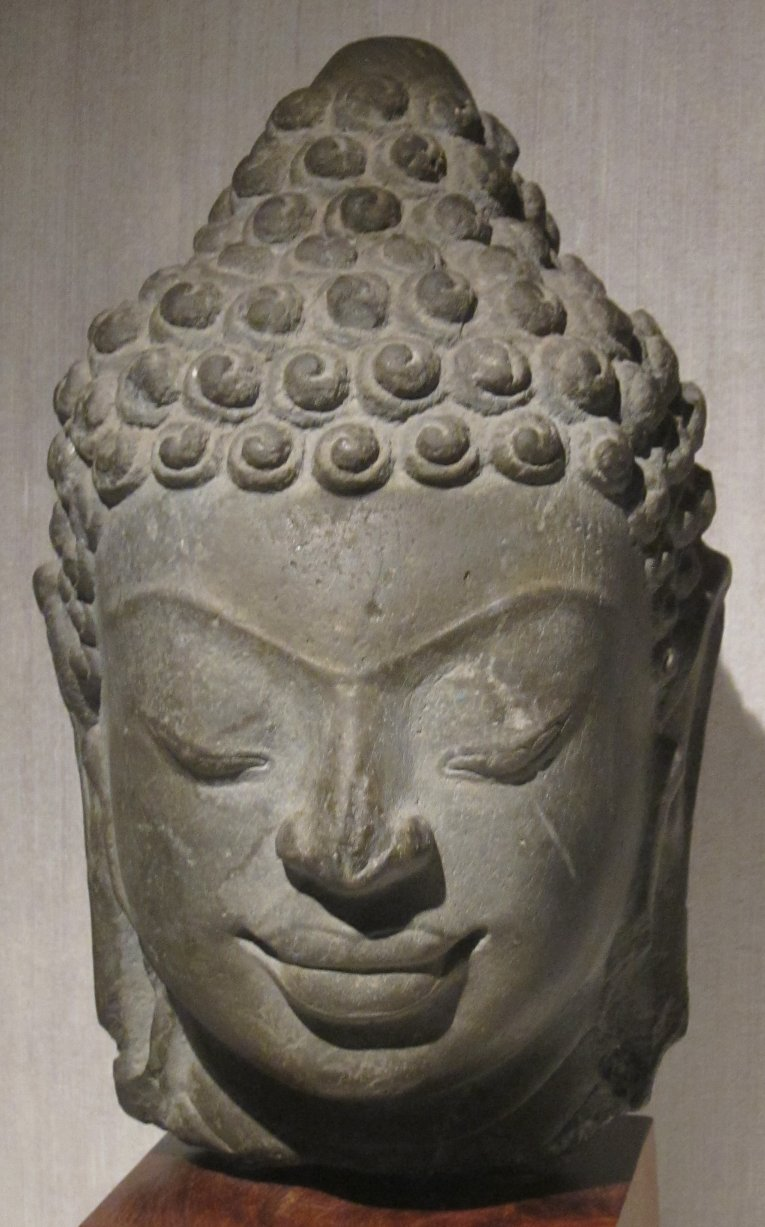
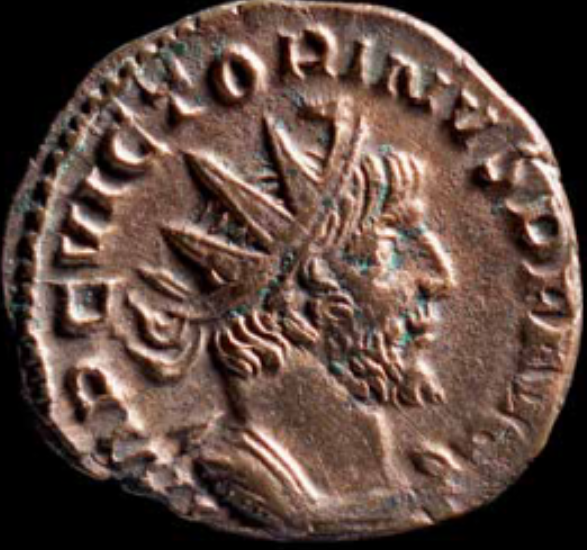
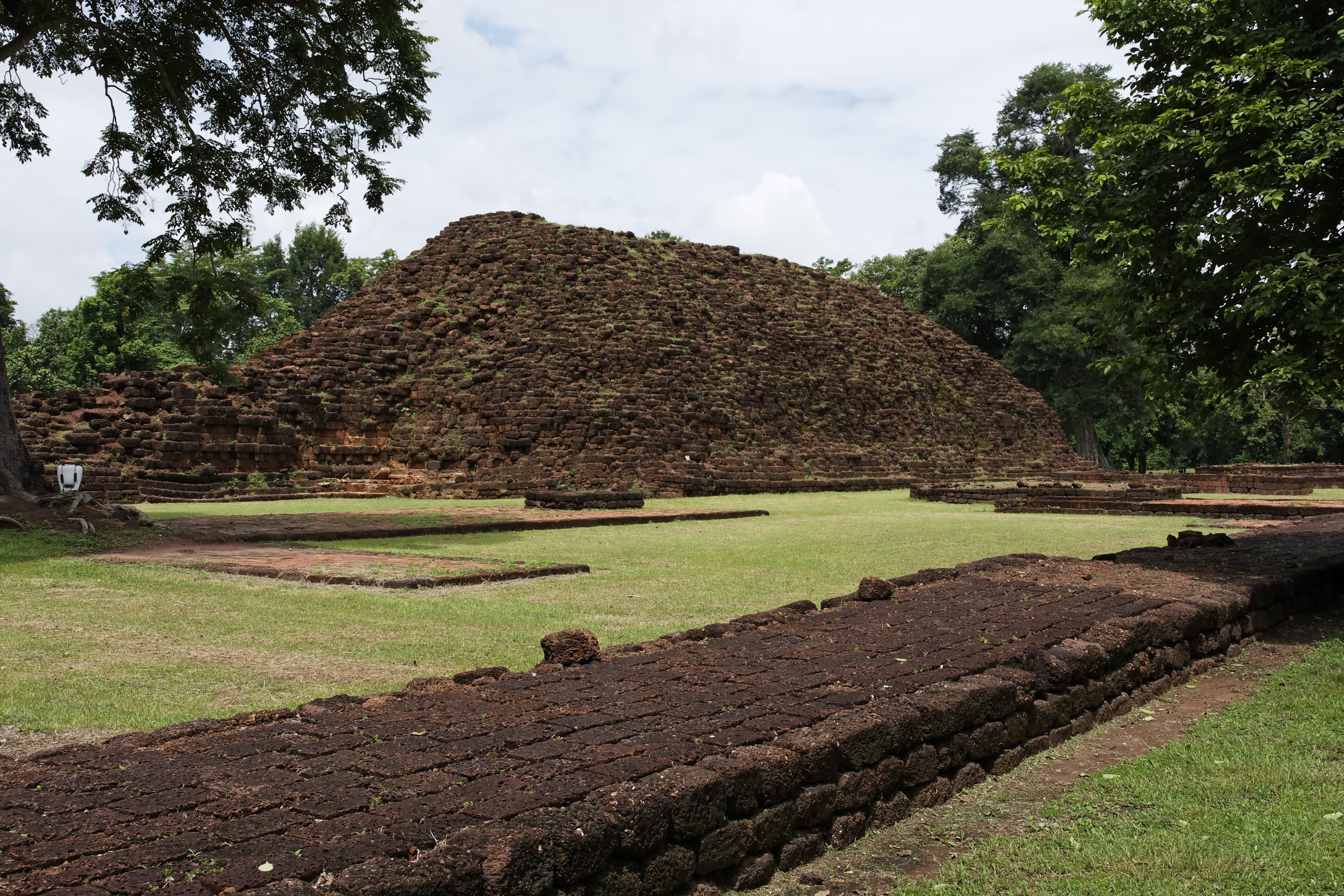
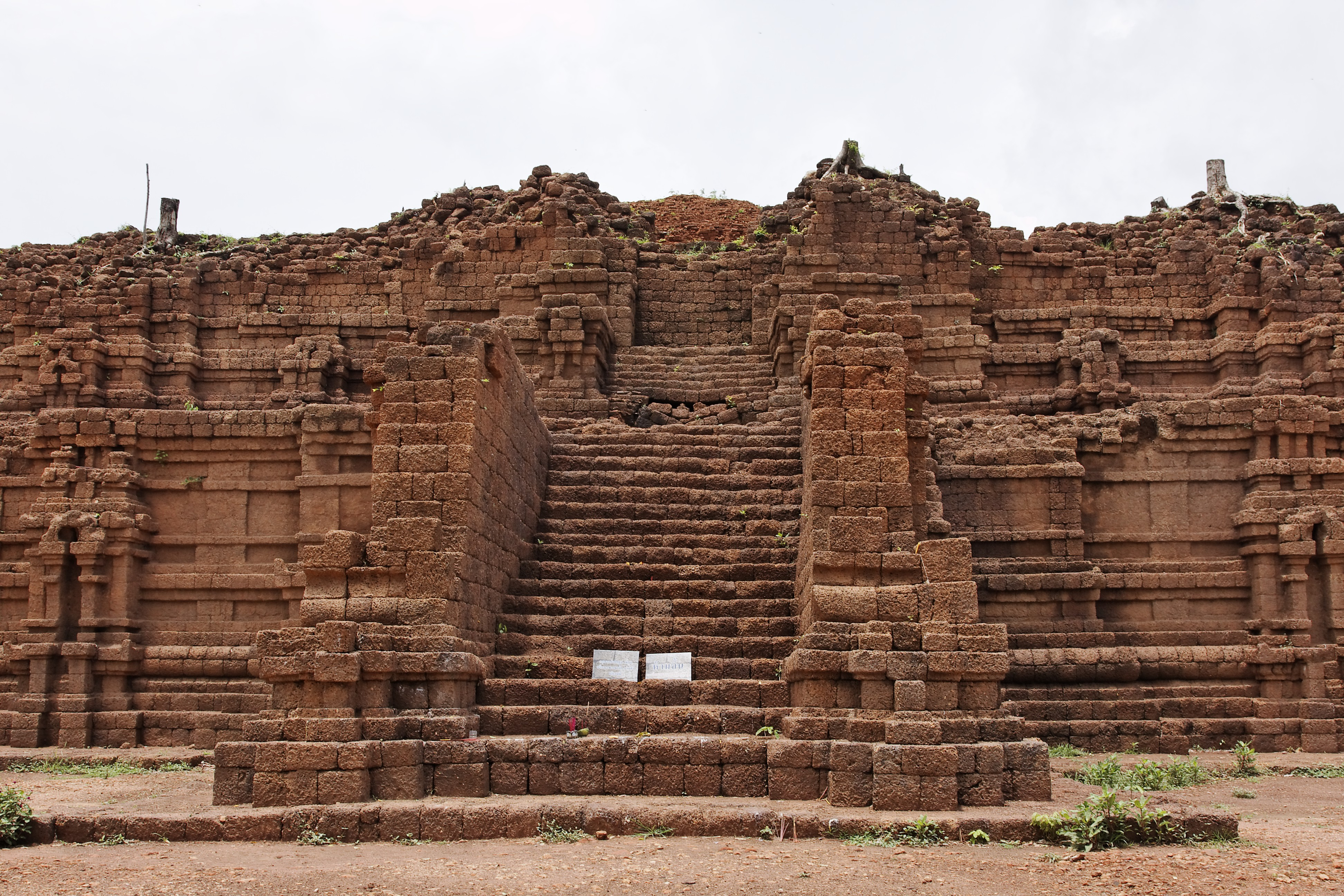
- Spread of Dvaravati Culture and Mon Dvaravati sites. Mon Wheel of the Law (Dharmacakra), art of Dvaravati period, c. 8th century CE. Buddha, art of Dvaravati period, c. 8th-9th century CE. Bronze double denarius of the Gallic Roman emperor Victorinus (269-271 AD) found at U Thong, Thailand. Khao Khlang Nai was a Buddhist sanctuary. The central stupa, rectangular in shape and oriented toward the east, is characteristic of dvaravati architectural style, dated back around 6th-7th century CE. Khao Khlang Nok, was an ancient Dvaravati-style stupa in Si Thep, dated back around 8th-9th century CE, at present, it is large laterite base.
- Religion: Buddhism, Hinduism
- Historical era: 7th-11th century
  - Established: 7th
  - Disestablished: 11th century

Dvaravati (Thai: ทวารวดี) was an ancient Mon kingdom from the 7th century to the 11th century that was located in the region now known as central Thailand. It was described by Chinese pilgrims in the middle of the 7th century as a Buddhist kingdom named To-lo-po-ti situated to the west of Isanapura (Cambodia) and to the east of Sri Ksetra (Burma). Dvaravati also refers to a culture, an art style, and a disparate conglomeration of principalities of Mon people. Archaeological research over the past two decades or so has revealed the presence of a "Proto-Dvaravati" period which spans the 4th to 5th centuries, and perhaps earlier.

== History ==
The culture of Dvaravati was based around moated cities, the earliest of which appears to be U Thong in what is now Suphan Buri Province. Other key sites include Nakhon Pathom, Phong Tuk, Si Thep, Khu Bua and Si Mahosot, amongst others. Legends engraved on royal urns report the following kings: Suryavikrama (673-688), Harivikrama (688-695), Sihavikrama (695-718). A Khmer inscription dated 937 documents a line of princes of Chanasapura started by a Bhagadatta and ended by a Sundaravarman and his sons Narapatisimhavarman and Mangalavarman. But at that time, the 12th century, Dvaravati began to come under constant attacks and aggressions of the Khmer Empire and central Southeast Asia was ultimately invaded by King Suryavarman II in the first half of the 12th century. Hariphunchai survived its southern progenitors until the late 13th century, when it was incorporated into Lan Na.

The term Dvaravati derives from coins which were inscribed in Sanskrit śrī dvāravatī. The Sanskrit word dvāravatī literally means "that which has gates".

Little is known about the administration of Dvaravati. It might simply have been a loose gathering of chiefdoms rather than a centralised state, expanding from the coastal area of the upper peninsula to the riverine region of Chao Phraya River. Hinduism and Buddhism were significant. The three largest settlements appear to have been at Nakhon Pathom, Suphanburi, and Praak Srigacha, with additional centers at U Thong, Chansen, Khu Bua, Pong Tuk, Mueang Phra Rot, Lopburi, Si Mahosot, Kamphaeng Saen, Dong Lakhon, U-Taphao, Ban Khu Mueang, and Si Thep.

The traditional chronology of Dvaravati is mainly based on the Chinese textual account and stylistic comparison by art historians. However, the results from excavations in Chansen and Tha Muang mound at U-Thong raise questions about the traditional dating. Newly dated typical Dvaravati cultural items from the site of U-Thong indicate that the starting point of the tradition of Dvaravati culture may possibly date as far back to 200 CE. Archaeological, art historical, and epigraphic (inscriptions) evidence all indicate, however, that the main period of Dvaravati spanned the seventh to ninth centuries. Dvaravati culture and influence also spread into Isan and parts of lowland Laos from the sixth century onward. Key sites include Mueang Fa Daet in Kalasin Province and Mueang Sema in Nakhon Ratchasima Province.

== Art ==
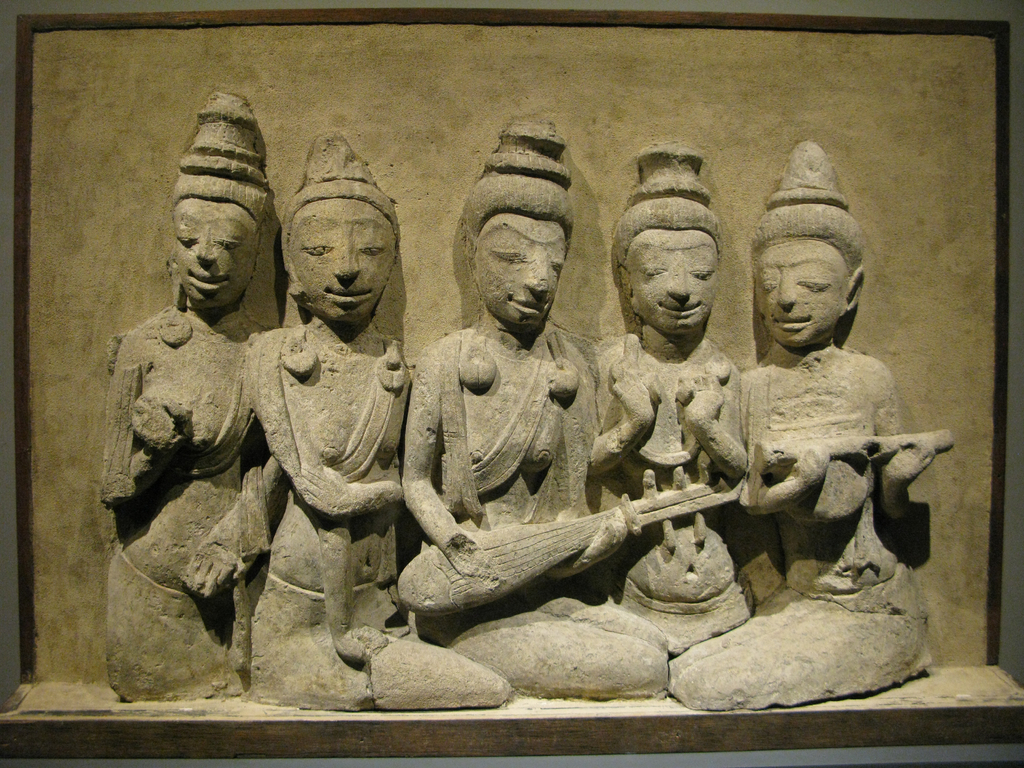
Thailand, Ku Bua, (Dvaravati culture), 650-700 C.E.. Three musicians in right are playing (from center) a 5-stringed lute, cymbals, a tube zither or bar zither with gourd resonator.

Dvaravati itself was heavily influenced by Indian culture, and played an important role in introducing Buddhism and particularly Buddhist art to the region. Stucco motifs on the religious monuments include garudas, makaras, and Nāgas. Additionally, groups of musicians have been portrayed with their instruments, prisoners, females with their attendants, soldiers indicative of social life. Votive tablets have also been found, also moulds for tin amulets, pottery, terracotta trays, and a bronze chandelier, earrings, bells and cymbals.
