= Rāmaññadesa =

Term for land of Mon people

Rāmaññadesa (Burmese: ရာမညဒေသ, pronounced [ɹàməɲa̰ dèθa̰]; Mon: ဒေသရးမည) is a Burmese and Mon word which means "country of the Ramans". This was because the Mons were previously called Ramans. The term was coined by King Dhammazedi in 1479.

== History ==
Its primary meaning is "pleasant and lovely". Ramaññadesa and Suvannabhumi are names referring to the Mon heartland in the remote past which covered Myanmar and Thailand. The name Ramaññadesa and Suvannabhumi may be the Indianized and they were used in the old Indian literature. These two names also occurred in the two oldest chronicles of Ceylon known as Dipavamsa and Mahavamsa composed in the 4th century and 6th century respectively. Its sinicized name is Ling-yang which had been mentioned in the Chinese accounts between the 3rd and 5th centuries AD. The two Wu envoys took notes about a place named Ling-yang in AD 220. After subdued by Burmese refugees in 1057 AD and Thai refugees in 1287 AD, Ramaññadesa, centered at Pegu as its capital, and being referred as the Mon Kingdom of Peguans (Hanthawadi) by the 14th and 15th centuries notes of Sri Lankan and Europeans, decreased by lower Burma only which is annexed by the Burmese king Alaungpaya in 1757 AD.

== Critics ==
Historian of Burma Michael Aung-Thwin, of the University of Hawaii, a scholar of Asian Studies has challenged the historicity of Ramaññadesa in his book, "Mists of Ramanna: the Legend that was Lower Burma", published in 2005. In Aung-Thwin's view, this Monland is a legend.

However, subsequent work by Burma scholar Donald Stadtner, of the University of Texas at Austin, has systematically analysed Aung-Thwin's evidence and found it does not stand up to archaeological & epigraphic evidence. In his research article “The Mon of Lower Burma”, published by Journal of the Siam Society, 2008, Vol. 96 - Stadtner describes the rich range of cultural artifacts found in Lower Burma in the first millennium, indicating that Lower Burma was equal to Upper Burma, inhabited by the Pyu people. His article then connects this cultural activity to the Mon.
