= Lavo Kingdom =

Historical country

- 648–1388
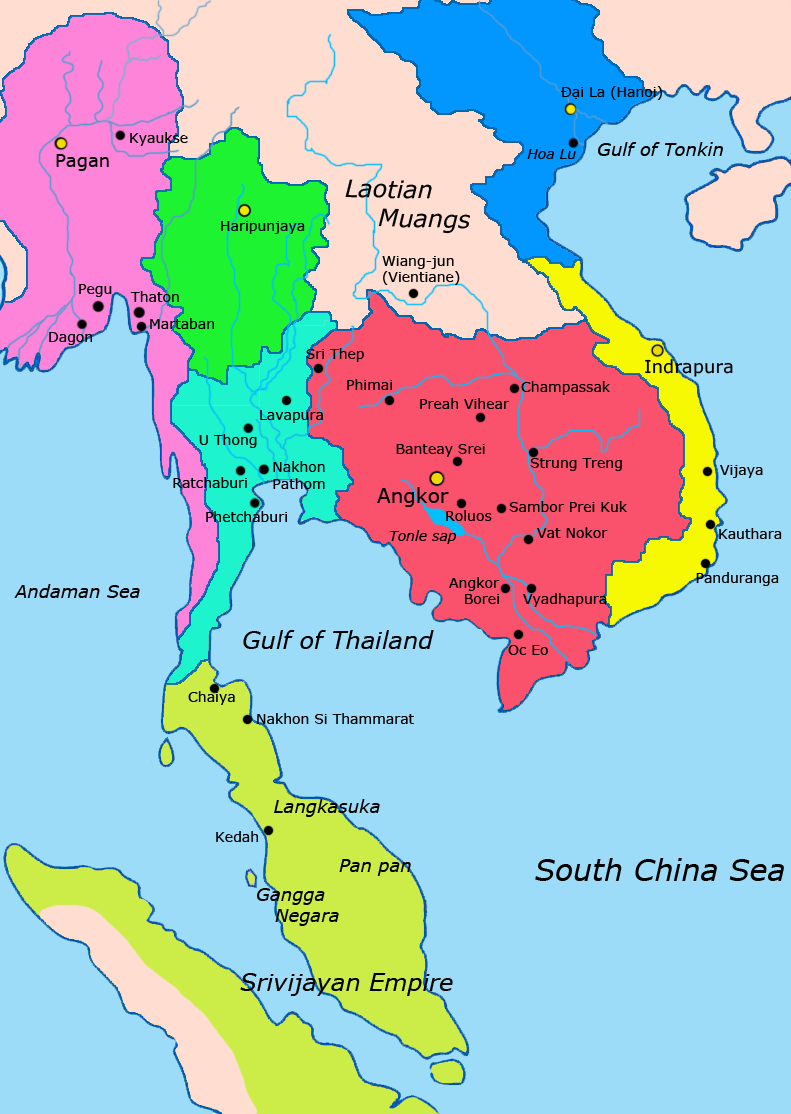
- Map of mainland Southeast Asian polities c. 1000–1100 CE: Cyan: Lavo Kingdom; Red: Khmer Empire; Green: Haripuñjaya; Light green: Srivijaya; Yellow: Champa; Blue: Đại Việt; Pink: Pagan kingdom

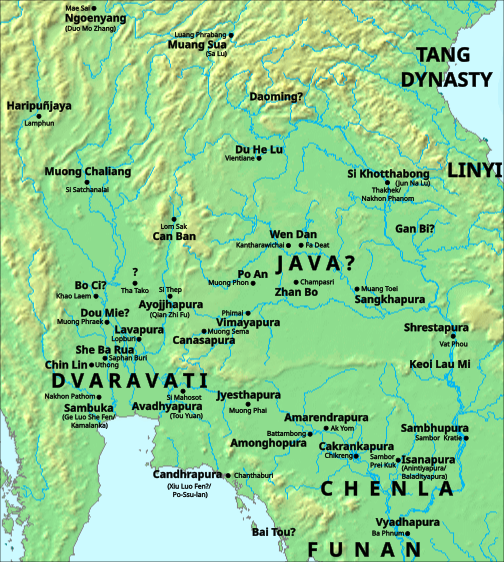
- Proposed locations of ancient kingdoms in Menam and Mekong Valleys in the 7th century based on the details provided in the Chinese leishu, Cefu Yuangui, and others.
- Capital: Lopburi (before 1080s); Ayodhya (after 1080s)
- Common languages: Old Mon; Old Malay; Old Khmer; Old Thai
- Religion: Buddhism (Mahayana, Theravada)
- Government: Mandala kingdom
- Monarch
  - 648–700 CE (first): Kalavarnadisharaja
  - 1052–1069: Chandrachota
  - 1344–1369: Ramathibodi I
  - 1351–1388 (last): Ramesuan
- Historical era: Post-classical era
  - Fall of Tou Yuan: 647
  - Establishment: 648
  - Tambralinga vassal: 927–946
  - Fall of Ayodhyapura: 946
  - Destroyed by Angkor: 1001
  - Angkor vassal: 946–1052
  - Reclaimed by Suphannabhum/ Haripuñjaya: 1052
  - Ayodhya as capital (Xiān): 1082–1351
  - Lavapura of Chaliang: 1106–1181
  - Lavapura of Angkor: 1181–1218
  - Lavapura of Phraek Si Racha: 1218–1351
  - Formation of Ayutthaya: 1351

Area
  - Total: 170,000 km^{2} (66,000 sq mi)
Preceded by
Syamapura
Dvaravati
Tou Yuan
Duō Miè
Succeeded by
Sukhothai
Ayutthaya
Angkor
Hariphunchai
Chaliang
Asadvarapura

The Lavo Kingdom (Thai: อาณาจักรละโว้) was a mandala in the lower Chao Phraya basin from the 7th century until 1388. Its centre was Lavapura until the 1080s, when it moved to Ayodhya (Xiān). Ayodhya and Lavo sent separate embassies to the Chinese court in the late 1200s, so the two may have been distinct states.

Before the 9th century Lavo was one of the supra-regional centres of the mandala-style polities of Dvaravati, with Si Thep, Sema, Phimai and Nakhon Pathom. Climate change and invasion from neighbouring polities reduced several of those centres, and the mandalas of the Menam valley then fell into three groups. Lavo (modern Lopburi) lay to the east, in closer contact with the Angkorian and pre-Angkorian worlds; Suphannaphum (modern Suphanburi) to the west, in closer contact with the Mon and Malay worlds; and the northern polities, more mixed than either in culture, ethnicity and language. Meanwhile, the Mun–Chi mandalas allied with Kambujadesa in the Tonlé Sap basin.

== Name ==
The capital is Lavapura (ลวปุระ) in Indic form, the city of Lava, and Lavo (ละโว้) in Thai tradition; the site is modern Lopburi. Tang dynasty chronicles record tribute from Lavo under the name Tou-ho-lo (堕和罗国). The monk Xuanzang called it Tou-lo-po-ti, a form that seems to echo Dvaravati, and placed it between Chenla and Pagan. By the Song dynasty it was Luówō (羅渦). Puthep Prapagorn assigns the same characters to Xuanzang instead, holding that Lavo was known as Luó-wō-guó (羅渦國) by 629.

Records of the 13th and 14th centuries render it Luó hú (羅斛), which stands beside Xiān (暹) in Yuan tribute lists and in the compound Xiānluó hú (暹羅斛) adopted after the two were joined. The pairing outlasted the union, and Chinese records treat the two as Xian-Luo thereafter, and sometimes extend the compound to Xian-Luohu-Sumenbang by adding Suphan Buri. The name is older than the Yuan lists. Song merchants record Luó Hú (罗斛) among four polities of the lower Menam basin, beside Zhēn Lǐ Fù (真里富), Róng Lǐ (茸里) and Xún Fān (浔番).

Chit Phumisak argued that the derivation runs the other way, and that Lavo is the older form rather than a Thai contraction of Lavapura. Old Khmer epigraphy writes the name with the two consonants in cluster, Lvo in the 1022 inscription of Suryavarman I at Lopburi and Lvodayapura under Jayavarman VII. Khmer scribes trained in Sanskrit, he argued, would not have reduced Lavapura to Lvo had the Indic form been the original. He connected the element instead to a Mon–Khmer word for hill or mountain, comparing the ethnonyms ละว้า (Lawa) and ลัวะ (Lawuea) and the Lao place-name ละแว (Lawae). On his reading the Sanskritised Lavapura, and the modern ลพบุรี (Lopburi) formed from it, are later back-formations made once the town had been drawn into the cult of Rama, whose son was Lava. Pali chronicles of the north adopt the Sanskritised form uniformly. Gordon Luce had argued along similar lines that the Lawa once held much of central Thailand as far south as Lopburi, on a proposed link between the seventh-century Lavapuri and the ethnonym Lawa.

Northern texts, among them the Jinakalamali, the Northern Chronicle and the Kalyani inscriptions, call Lavo Kamboja (กัมโพช). Sujit Wongthes argued in 1983 that the name there denotes Lavo and a group of towns linked to it, among them Sukhothai, Sawankhalok, Phichai and Thung Yang, rather than Cambodia. Reading it as Cambodia had, in his view, led historians to treat Lavo as a Khmer dependency.

Phiset Chiajanpong proposed that Lopburi is the town recorded as Dvāravatī, on the strength of its Dvaravati remains and of a long tradition making it a gathering place of relics. He cites Sukhothai inscription 2, which has Phra Maha Thera Si Sattha rebuild a ruined great relic monument standing in the middle of a city of Lord Kṛṣṇa, a restoration it places in the 14th or 15th century. He cites also the Royal Autograph Chronicle, which under 1777 calls Lawo, that is Lopburi, a gathering place of relics standing in the middle of the Thai land. Walailak Songsiri rejects any such identification, holding that the name covers the whole set of polities of the plain and that no single town can stand for it.

== History ==
=== Dvaravati background ===
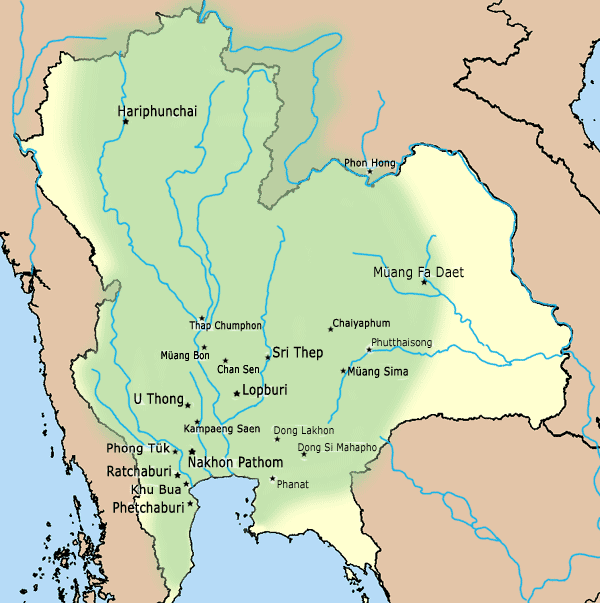
Map of settlements of Dvaravati culture from the 6th to 9th centuries

Mon-speaking populations had been established in what is now Thailand for centuries. Between the 6th and 9th centuries a Theravada Buddhist culture associated with them developed in central and northeastern Thailand. The Mon Buddhist kingdoms that rose in the central plain of Thailand and in what is now Laos were collectively called Dvaravati.

=== Rivalry with the Qian and the founding of Lavo: 6th–7th c. ===
Conflict between the Dvaravati and Qian monarchies is traced to the 6th century. Siddhijaya Brahmadeva of Manohana, commonly identified with Ayojjhapura and further equated with Si Thep, (Note: Manohana has been identified by Sukanya Sudchaya with Ayojjhapura, the city which is equated with Si Thep by Pensupa Sukkata.) the principal centre of Qiān Zhī Fú, relocated westward in 590 to establish his authority in the western Menam Valley, in the vicinity of modern Nakhon Pathom. This brought him into conflict with the Brahmanical leadership under Kakabhadra, who had ruled the polity since 569. (Note: According to the chronicle, Manit Vallibhotama (มานิต วัลลิโภดม) dated the enthronement of Kakabhadra's successor, Kalavarnadisharaja, to 641 CE. From this calculation, Kakabhadra's reign is estimated to have commenced around 569 CE, as the text attributes to him a rule of 72 years over Takkasila.)

In 629 (Note: The Northern Chronicle states that the city of Lavo's Lavapura took 19 years to complete in 648, thus, the construction might have begun in 629.) Kakabhadra's son Kalavarnadisharaja commissioned Brahmans to build a new settlement in the eastern valley, south of Si Thep. Following Kakabhadra's death, Kalavarnadisharaja succeeded to power at Nakhon Pathom in 641. He then reduced Tou Yuan (Si Mahosot) to vassal status in 647. In 648, he transferred the political centre to the newly founded settlement, later known as Lavapura, and formally proclaimed the establishment of the Lavo Kingdom. Some sources put the foundation a century earlier, in 538. Tradition credits him with hegemony over all the major polities of the Menam valley. (Note: As says in the Northern Chronicle that several polities in the Menam valley were under his control. Those including, Davaraburi (ทวารบุรี; potentially his former seat at Nakhon Pathom), Santanaha (สันตนาหะ; Suphan Buri region), Ase (อเส; Phraek Si Racha region), Kosambi (possibly Gān Bì in the Chinese sources), Sawangkaburi, Nagendhara (นาเคนทร; potentially Chiang Saen), and Sukhothai.)

No source records a direct war between Lavo and Si Thep in this phase. The Jinakalamali instead describes hostilities between Si Thep and Dvaravati's Nakhon Pathom, held after Kalavarnadisharaja's departure by Anuruddha. In it Dvaravati forces capture the Si Thep king Manohanaraj and carry him off, after which a puppet monarch was installed at Si Thep.

=== The Mon polity: 7th–9th c. ===
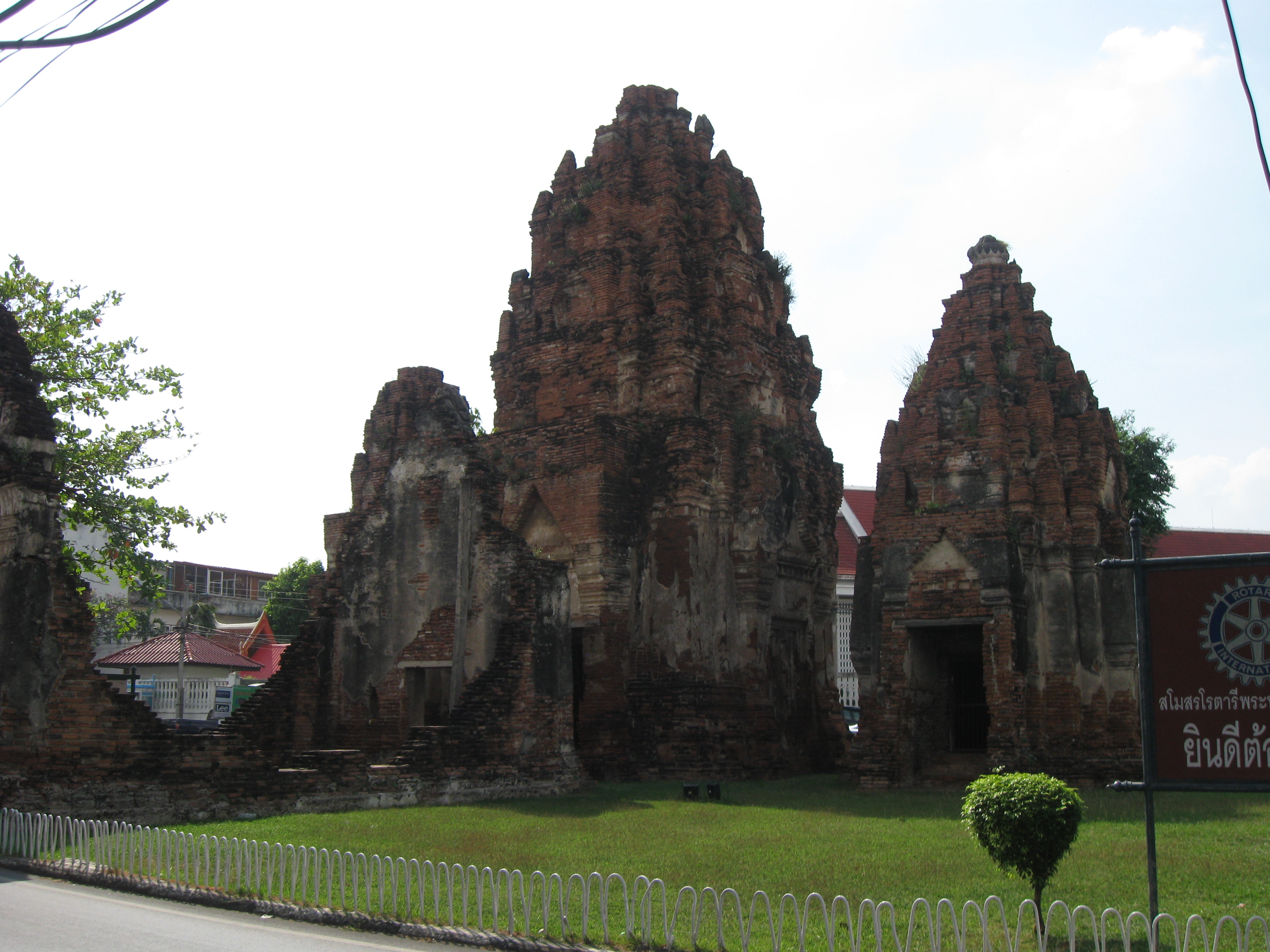
Prang Khaek, a Chalukya style complex, built around the 9-10th century.

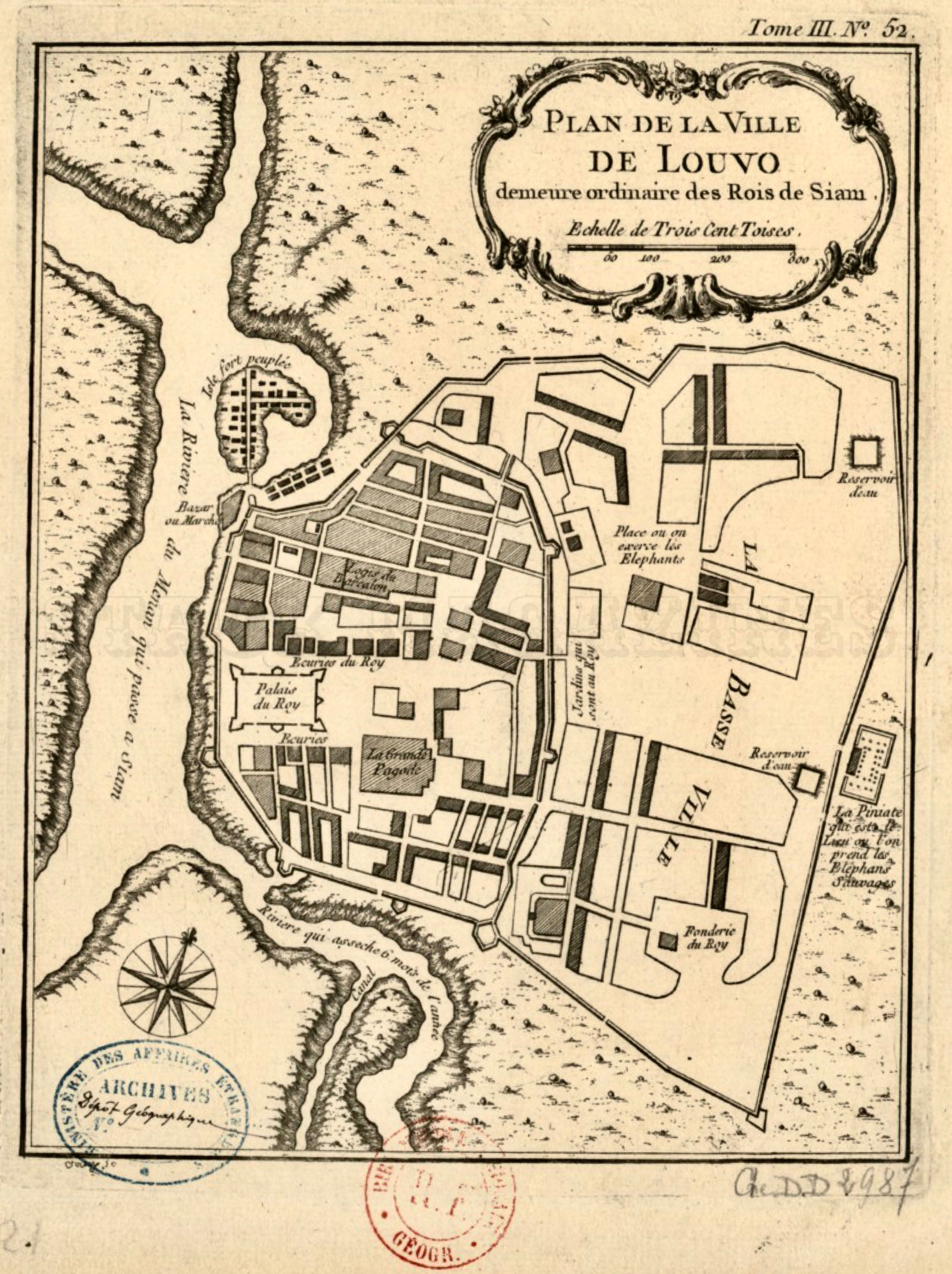
A plan of Narai's new capital complex of Lopburi ("Louvo" in French sources).

The Northern Thai Chronicles give the founding from another tradition. In them Lavo is founded by Kalavarnadisharaja, who came from Takkasila in 648, a year after Dvaravati made Tou Yuan its vassal. He was a son of Kakabhadra, king of Takkasila, a city assumed to be Nakhon Chai Si of Kamalanka, who set the Chula Sakarat era in 638, which the Siamese and Burmese kept until the 19th century.

Stone inscriptions in ancient Mon script from northern and central Thailand indicate that the Lavo and Haripuñjaya mandalas were probably populated by the same group, the "Mon" or another Austroasiatic-speaking people. Dynastic ties kept the two on good terms for the first 300 years.

The only native language attested in early Lavo is Old Mon. The migration of the Tai peoples into the Chao Phraya valley is thought to have taken place during the kingdom's lifetime.

Theravada Buddhism remained prominent in Lavo, though Hinduism and Mahayana Buddhism from the Khmer Empire were also influential. Baker and Pasuk caution that the vocabulary of sectarian affiliation, the term Theravada among it, is a modern coinage, and that the Chinese monk Yijing found in the late 7th century that Hinayana and Mahayana approaches were practised in a mixed way in the region.

Around the late 7th century Lavo expanded to the north. The Northern Thai Chronicles, among them the Cāmadevivaṃsa, make Camadevi, first ruler of Haripuñjaya, a daughter of a Lavo king. Late in the century the Legend of the Arhat (ตำนานนิทานพระอรหันต์) has Balidhiraja, eldest son of Kalavarnadisharaja and ruler of Sukhothai, march south into the western valley and depose its ruler, while Balidhiraja's elder son Balipatijaya took Lavo about 700.

Little is recorded of how the kingdom worked, and most of what is known comes from archaeology. Local rulership at Lavapura is attested by a Sanskrit inscription on the lotus base of a standing stone Buddha, recovered in 1924 from a mound at the north-eastern corner of the perimeter wall of Wat Mahathat (LB 5; K.577). It records that Nāyaka Ārjava, chief of the people of Taṅgura and son of the Lord of Śāmbuka, erected the image. Cœdès connected Śāmbuka with the Śamvūkapaṭṭana of the Preah Khan inscription (K.908), in a string of towns answering to Lopburi, Suphan Buri, Ratchaburi, Sing Buri and Phetchaburi. Baker and Pasuk give the six as Lavodayapura (Lopburi), Svarnapura (Suphanburi), Sambūkapura, which they place tentatively at Ban Pong, Jaya-Rājapuri (Ratchaburi), Jaya-Simhapuri (Mueang Sing) and Jaya-Vajrapuri (Phetchaburi or Kamphaeng Phet), six of the twenty-five cities to which the image was sent. Their reading of the third name differs from Cœdès's in form and in place, and they put the fifth at Mueang Sing rather than Sing Buri.

=== Chenla and the wars in the Menam valley: 7th–8th c. ===
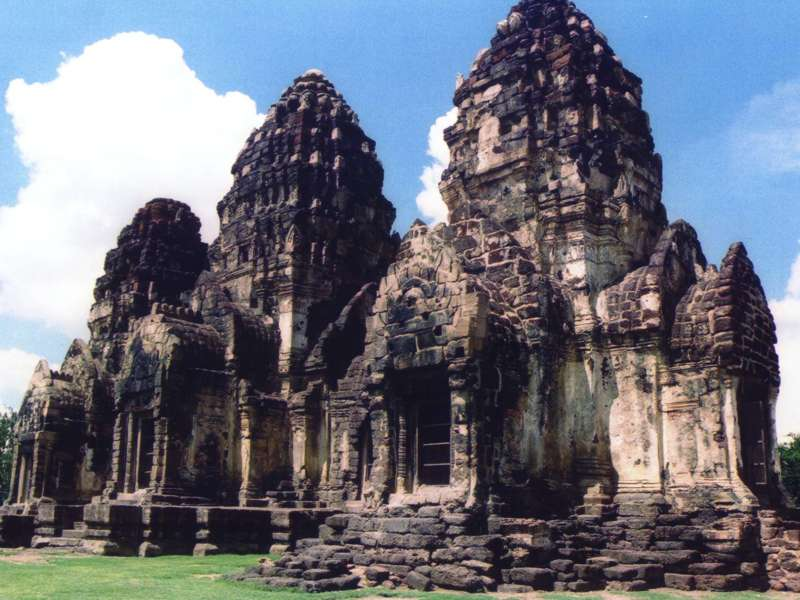
Prang Sam Yot, showing considerable Khmer influences on the architecture in late 11th century

Isanavarman I (r. 616–637) of Chenla extended Khmer influence into the Menam valley by marriage and by campaign in the 7th century, but exercised no political control there.

During the Sui period (581–618), two sister kingdoms, Zhū Jiāng, identified as a Dvaravati-influenced polity, and Cān Bàn, made royal intermarriages with Chenla. They then fought several wars against Dvaravati Tou Yuan to the northwest. Tou Yuan later became a vassal of Dvaravati in 647, and known as Lavo in 648. The warfare between Chenla and Dvaravati continued into the Tang period, drawing in Qiān Zhī Fú, Xiū Luó Fēn and Gān Bì. The New Book of Tang groups the three as alike in customs and credits 20,000 warriors each to the first two, 40,000 to the pair, and 5,000 to Gān Bì. Some of these battles may belong to the wars between Lavo and the neighbouring Mon kingdom of Haripuñjaya in the early 10th century.

Tatsuo Hoshino makes the connection from the Chinese side. He identifies the Qian Tuo Huan that fought Chenla in the New Book of Tang with the Tuo Huan the same work lists among Dvaravati's vassals, and both with pre-Khmer Lopburi. Many wars were fought between Chenla and Lopburi in the Tang period, and some of them, he suggests, may be the conflicts between Lopburi and Haripuñjaya recorded in the Jinakalamali, the Munlasatsana and the Chamadevivamsa. (Note: Hoshino reads the Cantonese of Qian Tuo Huan as Goh Toh Wun or Kin Toh Wun, which he takes for a rendering of Candapura or Kandapura, while the nou of the fuller form Nou Tuo Huan yields Lavo, so that the whole would be something like Lavo Chandahan. The final character is romanised both huan and yuan, which is why the same polity appears as Tuo Huan and as Tou Yuan.) He also observes that the Tang sources name Chenla's wars with Huan Wang before those with Lopburi, and reads that order as implying the eastern front was the graver of the two.

In addition to Lavo, Chenla also encountered Línyì to the northeast. Through royal connections, Cān Bàn thereafter became a complete vassal of Chenla, until its disintegration in the late 7th century, after which it came under Wen Dan. The Chenla power struggle that led to the kingdom's dissolution also diminished its power in the Menam Valley.

The Ban Wang Pai inscription (K. 978), found in Phetchabun province, names a Bhavavarman as the son of a king of Si Thep. Some scholars have suggested he is Bhavavarman II rather than Bhavavarman I (r. 580–598), on letter forms that may put the inscription after 627.

=== Arrival of the Tai peoples: 7th–9th c. ===
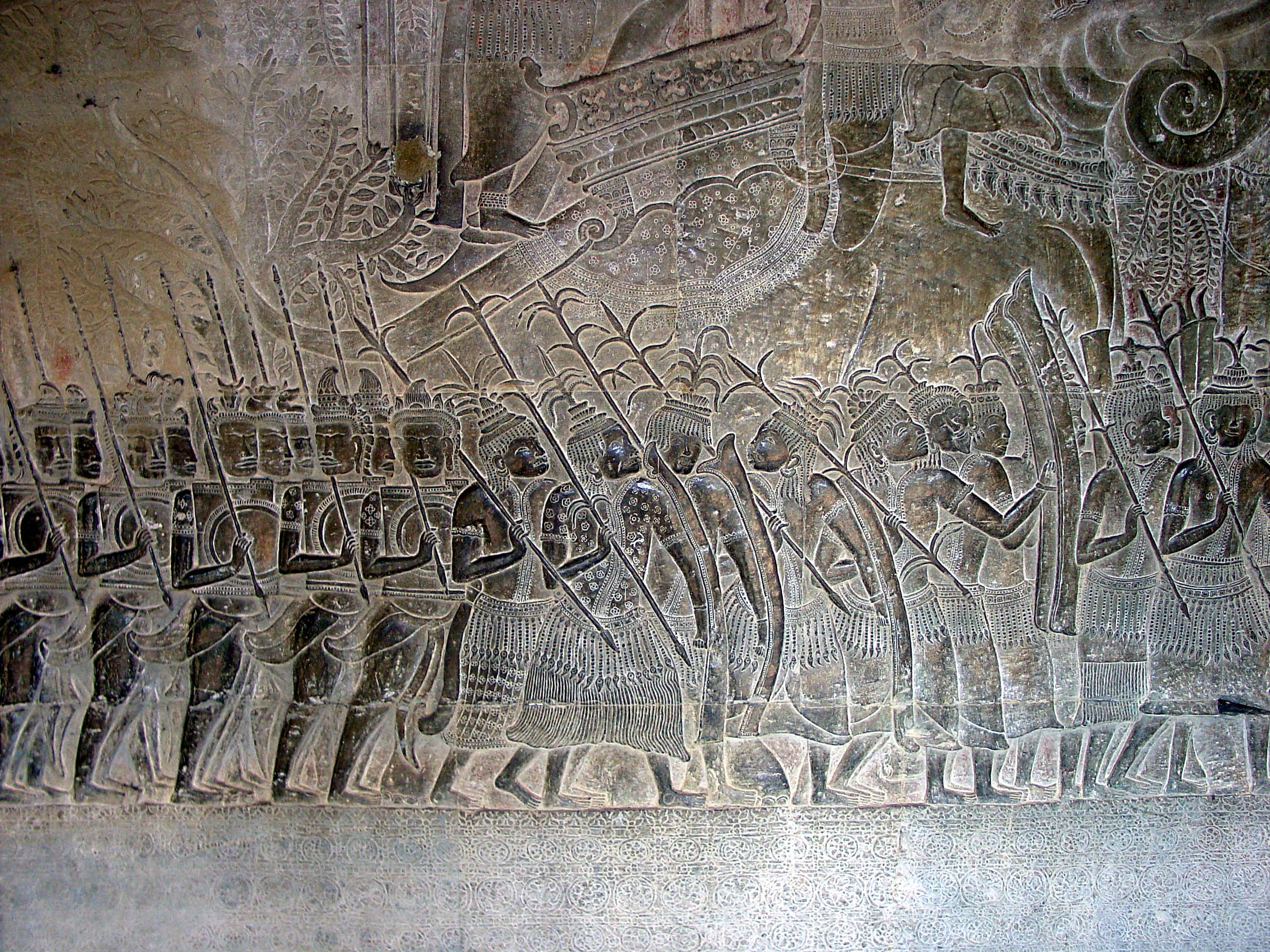
The consensus of modern scholars is that the 12th century marching “Syam Kuk” on Angkor Wat aren't the Tai/Siamese (ethnic Thai). Michael Vickery documents the usage of Syam, Sien, Siam, and the Chinese Hsien by the Cham, Khmer, and Chinese to explain syām kuk doesn’t refer to an ethnicity but a geographic location, specifically the southern central plains of modern Thailand that was populated by the Mon-Khmer in the 12th century.

Modern Thai historians hold that the Tai peoples originated in northern Vietnam and Guangxi province in China. Tai speakers were living in northern mainland Southeast Asia by the 8th century. Five linguistic groups emerged. The northern Tai in China (ancestors of Zhuang); the upland Tai people in northern Vietnam (ancestors of the Black, White and Red Tai); the Tais in northeastern Laos and bordering Vietnam (ancestors of the Tai of Siang Khwang and the Siamese in Ayutthaya); the Tai in northern Laos; and the Tai west of Luang Prabang, northern Thailand and in the adjoining parts of Laos, Yunnan and Burma.

Tai settlement in present-day Thailand may have begun as early as the 7th or 8th century, along the trans-Mekong trade route running west from northern Champa, where they met Dvaravati in the Menam valley. Several petty kingdoms were formed, such as Gān Bì in the vicinity of Savannakhet, Wen Dan in the Chi River basin, Cān Bàn in the upper Pa Sak valley, and Xiū Luó Fēn to the west of Chenla. They were present also in the inland Champa kingdom of Zhān Bó and in Wen Yang (文陽) district, Changzhou Prefecture (長州 or 裳州) of the Tang dynasty in modern Sakon Nakhon and Nakhon Phanom in Thailand and Khammouane province in Laos. The Wen Yang district is identified as the present-day Thakhek in Laos. Given their troop strengths, 30,000 for Xiū Luó Fēn, 20,000 for Gē Luó Shě Fēn and 5,000 for Gān Bì, they likely participated in the conflicts between Chenla and Dvaravati in the early 7th century, aligning with the faction that offered the greatest advantage. Following the decline in power of the Mon Dvaravati at Kamalanka in the 8th century, the Daic-speaking people of Qiān Zhī Fú gradually absorbed the remaining Dvaravati principalities of the western Menam valley. The Chinese called that polity Gē Luó Shě Fēn, a corruption of Jiā Luó Shě Fú or Canasapura, centred at Si Thep. Meanwhile, the eastern valley at Lavo remained under the Dvaravati monarchs until they fell under Tambralinga and Angkor in the 10th and 11th centuries, respectively.

=== Ayojjhapura and the decline of the Qian: 8th–10th c. ===
After Chenla fragmented early in the 8th century, Si Thep was the principal power left in the Menam basin. Chinese records place Qiān Zhī Fú (千支弗) there, its first tribute to the Chinese court falling about 656–661. From the 8th century the sources add Gē Luó Shě Fēn (歌羅舍分), placed west of Dvaravati and tentatively identified with Qiān Zhī Fú on a phonological match with Jiā Luó Shě Fú (迦逄舍佛), which Tatsuo Hoshino centres at Si Thep.

Two readings of Si Thep's reach differ over whether Lavo fell inside it. On Hoshino's, the change of name marks Si Thep spreading across much of the lower valley, Nakhon Pathom included, while Lavo to the east stayed within the older Dvaravati network. Hiram Woodward reaches a comparable picture from art history rather than the Chinese texts, and from a different premise, that Si Thep itself lay within Wen Dan. A Si Thep strong enough to dominate the 8th century may, he suggests, have held Lopburi, which Hoshino's reading places outside its sphere, together with Nakhon Pathom, U Thong and Khu Bua. He offers this as a possibility rather than a finding, the alternative being that the Dvaravati features at Si Thep came from a peaceful movement of monks before Wen Dan's rise. He also reserves judgement on Hoshino's identification of the Chinese toponyms that the first reading rests on.

A ruler called Padumasūriyavaṁśa appears at Indaprasthanagara in the central Menam valley by 757. Later traditions give him Lavo and Sukhothai, and a reach east across the Khorat Plateau as far as Mueang Talung in present-day Prakhon Chai district. The Ayutthaya Testimonies place Indaprasthanagara east of Sankhaburi, in the Phraek Si Racha region of the central valley. The Ratanabimbavamsa treats it and Ayojjhapura as separate and hostile, Adītaraj of Ayojjhapura, which several scholars identify with Si Thep, besieging Indaprasthanagara in the early 9th century after the death of its great ruler.

Through the 8th and 9th centuries the eastern Chao Phraya valley was likely centred on Ayojjhapura, as attested in the Pali chronicle traditions, notably the Ratanabimbavamsa and the Jinakalamali. Lavo is commonly read as its southern frontier fortress, subordinate but strategically placed.

After Adītaraj's campaign the Northern Chronicle and the Ratanabimbavamsa name a ruler for Lavapura. Bhūpati (ภูบดี) of Vajraprākārapura (วชิรปาการปุระ, modern Kamphaeng Phet), on good terms with both Ayojjhapura and Ngoenyang Chiang Rai, sent a son whose regnal name is not recorded to rule there. The Ayutthaya Testimonies make Vajraprākārapura itself a foundation of one of Padumasūriyavaṁśa's descendants, and have Lavapura under Indaprasthanagara from his reign onward.

The Si Thep line itself continued. The Śrī Canāśa inscription (K.949) dates the reign of Bhagadatta from 859. Its decline may have begun in the mid-10th century. A Khmer inscription of 946 records victories by the Angkorian king Rajendravarman II over Rāmaññadesa (lit. 'the land of the Mon') and Champa, and in 949 he appointed a kinsman, Vāp Upendra, governor of Rāmaññadeśa, which points the same way. Woodward suggests that Jayavarman II, founder of Kambujadesa, who came to the throne in 802, may have cultivated allies in the Mun–Chi basin to counterbalance Si Thep in the Pa Sak River basin to the west. He offers this as an alternative to his other reading, in which Jayavarman II defeated Wen Dan outright.

Ayojjhapura appears to have been largely abandoned by the 13th–14th century. Many Thai scholars attribute the decline to environmental factors, particularly climatic change, together with epidemic disease. The displaced population is thought to have moved mainly to Lavapura and Ayodhya (Xiān), both taken into the Ayutthaya Kingdom in the 14th century. After Ayojjhapura declined the central Thai city-states appear to have reorganised into two mandalas, Lavo (modern Lopburi) in the east and Suphannabhum (modern Suphan Buri) in the west.

=== Tambralinga, Angkor and Pagan incursions: 10th–11th c. ===
Lavo was attacked from several directions during the 10th and 11th centuries. Fighting with Haripuñjaya to the north in the early 900s left it open to annexation by Tambralinga from the south in 928. It was then devastated by Angkor from the east in 946 and 1001, raided by the Chola in 1030, and invaded by Pagan from the west in 1058 and 1087.

Battles between Lavo and Haripuñjaya are recorded from 925 to 927. According to the O Smach inscription, King Rathasatkara or Trapaka (Thai: อัตราสตกะราช/ตราพกะ) of Haripuñjaya moved south two years after his accession to seize Lavo. The Lavo king, Uchitthaka Chakkawat or Ucchitta Emperor (อุฉิฎฐกะจักรวรรดิ/อุจฉิตตจักรพรรดิ), moved northward to defend. The war drew in Tambralinga to the south, whose King Jivaka or Suchitra (พระเจ้าชีวก/พระเจ้าสุชิตราช) took the chance to occupy Lavo. Both Mon kings then fell back north to hold Haripuñjaya, but Rathasatkara was defeated and lost the city to the Lavo king. Failing to retake it, he moved south and settled at Phraek Si Racha (present-day Sankhaburi district). The episode appears in several chronicles, among them the Jinakalamali and the Cāmadevivaṃsa.

After Jivaka took Lavo's capital, Lavapura (ลวปุระ), he appointed his son, Kampoch (กัมโพช), as a new ruler and enthroned the ex-Lavo queen as his consort. Jivaka seized Suphannabhum within a few years of taking Lavo. Two princes of Suphannabhum, Thamikaraj and Chandrachota, fled to Haripuñjaya. Kampoch of Tambralinga tried and failed to annex Haripuñjaya the following year. He also failed to take another northern city, Nakaburi (นาคบุรี). Further battles between Haripuñjaya and Lavo followed.

After a nine-year civil war at Angkor, Tambralinga lost Lavo to Suryavarman I, whose troops destroyed Lavo and several polities of the upper Mun valley. His defeated rival Jayavīravarman withdrew not to Lavo but eastward into what is now northeastern Thailand, an inscription of 1008 recording his donation to the god Vimāya at Phimai after the loss of Angkor. Rulers had already been leaving the valley's older seats: Visnuraja is said to have moved from Phitsanulok to Phetchaburi in the mid to late 10th century. After the capture the population is said to have been taxed heavily, which may have prompted an exodus, and Lavapura was left abandoned.

Lakshmipativarman recovered it, and his appointment as governor by Suryavarman I is conventionally dated to 1006. His career is set out in the Khmer inscription K.1198, a stele of 116 lines dated 1014 and now in the National Museum of Cambodia, whose Sanskrit portion was published only in 2019. It is from this text that the course of the campaign is known. The king charged him with the government of Rāmanya, a form of Rāmañña denoting the Mon, "who occupy the western region", and its Sanskrit verses lament that Lavapura had been reduced to jungle by the defects of the Kali Age, its long-abandoned western districts to be restored and repopulated. U-tain Wongsathit and his co-authors read the text as one campaign moving from Angkor by way of Phanom Rung and Phanom Wan, where a rebellion by the Vau and Tampāṅ families was put down in 1011, to Lavapura. On that reading the conquest falls between 1011 and 1014 rather than in the opening years of the century. This marks Lavo's formal incorporation into Angkor. Walailak Songsiri rejects the chain of identifications on which the reading of Rāmanya rests. The earliest attested Mon form, rmeñ, occurs in an inscription of Kyansittha of Pagan dated 1102, nearly a century after Suryavarman I, and the Middle Mon rman was probably taken from Pali by way of Haripuñjaya, while the ramañ of the pre-Angkorian Prasat Bassac inscription (K.71) is a slave's name. She adds that Lakshmipativarman's family came from the Mekong basin, that inscriptions at Lavo about ten years later record accommodation between Brahmanical and Mahayana practice, that none describes a war leaving the country deserted, and that no Angkorian inscription of the whole period records a western campaign on the scale of the wars with Champa. She also notes where the stone was found. It came not from the west but from the Chong Chom – O Smach pass through the Dangrek, between what are now Kap Choeng district in Surin province and Samraong district in Oddar Meanchey, a crossing that faces the towns of Surin and Sisaket. Lavo at that time was governed by a Cambodian prince, as a part of Angkor's vassal state. Angkor had sought power over Dvaravati's Lavo since Rajendravarman II, whose victory over Rāmaññadesa in 946 is recorded in the K.872 Prasat Boeng Vien inscription.

To the north the Suphannabhum prince Thamikaraj was enthroned king of Haripuñjaya and, with Suphannabhum's help, marched south and took Lavo in 1052; his younger brother Chandrachota was appointed Lavo king. Shortly afterwards the Siamese ruler Srisimha returned from Phetchaburi to Phraek Si Racha.

Six years after Chandrachota's accession, in 1058, Anawrahta of Pagan invaded the Menam valley intending to annex Lavo. Chandrachota avoided a second devastation by marrying his queen's elder sister to the Pagan king, and the two became allies. The Burmese Hmannan Yazawin is read differently, as having Lavo submit in the course of the same campaign. Chandrachota's son, Narai I, became his successor who then moved Lavo capital to Ayodhya in the 1080s. During Narai's reign, Lavo experienced another invasion by Pagan in 1087 but the conflict ended with the negotiation. Narai died with no heir in 1087. This caused a 2-year Ayodhya civil war among the nobles, in which Phra Chao Luang won.

Tai settlement in the valley had meanwhile been under way for some time. The Tai Yuan or Tai Chiang Sean (ไทเชียงแสน) from the north, which later evolved into Lan Na, began to settle in the lower Menam Valley around 861, increased in influence in Lavo, and began to resist Angkorian control in the mid-11th century. Lavo is said to have been seized by Siamese from the western Menam Valley in the early 11th century and by the Tai king Phrom of Yonok in 1106, according to the local chronicles. A tribute mission to China in 1115, during the reign of Sri Thammasokkarat, has been taken to show that Lavo was independent at that time. Walailak gives 1115 and 1155 as Lavo's last two missions to the Song court. The mission of 1155 altered a reading of the Dong Mae Nang Mueang inscription. George Cœdès had argued that Lavo lacked the standing to have the mahārājādhirāja and mahāsenāpati the inscription names, and so assigned it to a king of Hariphunchai; on learning that Lavo had sent that mission separately from Angkor's, he withdrew the objection in a footnote added while his article was in press, and in 1968 stated a preference for Lavo. David K. Wyatt, who reports the change, notes that separate missions to the Chinese court are conventionally taken as an indication of independence, or of a bid for it.

=== Ayodhya as capital: 1080s–1350 ===
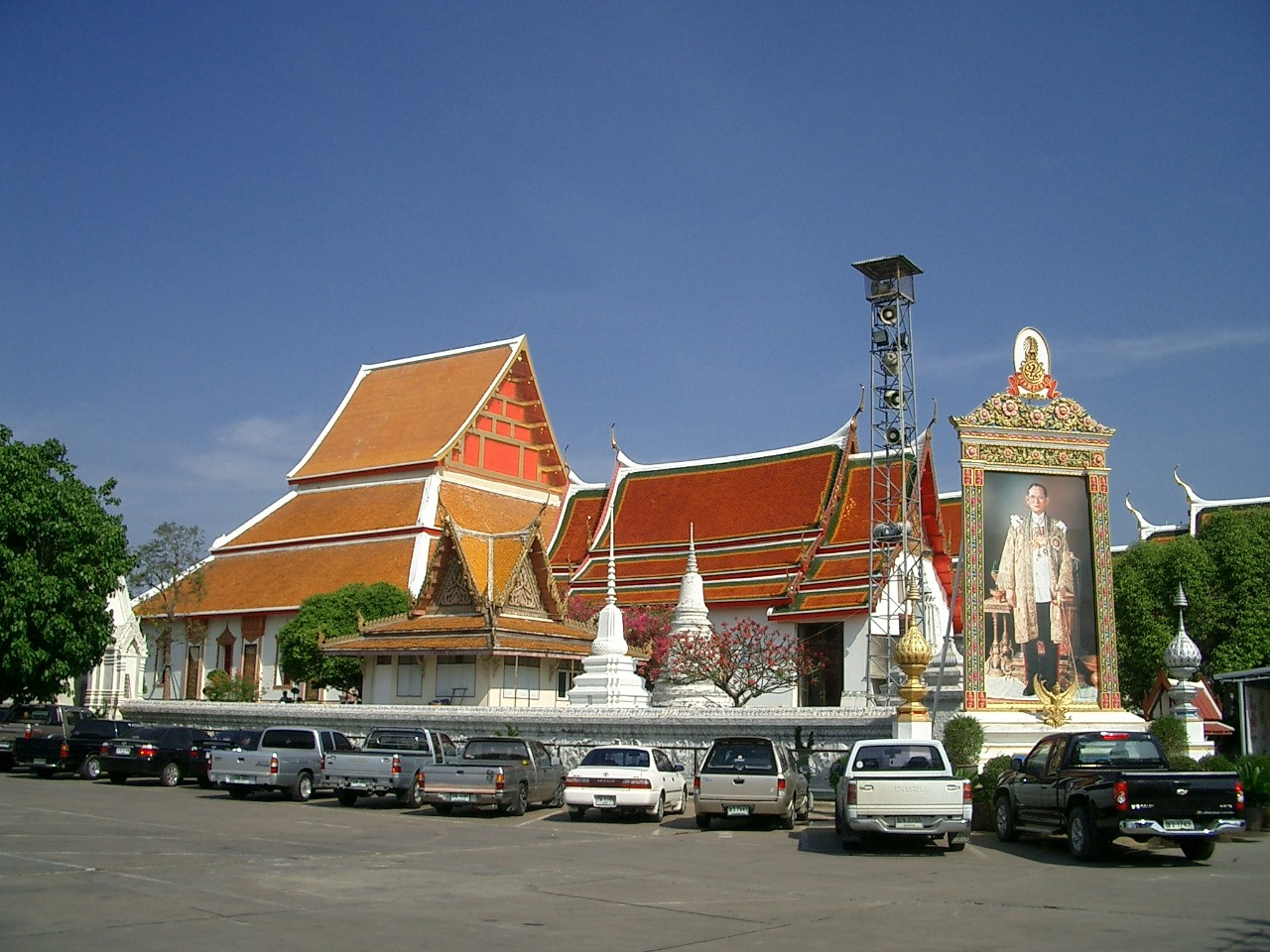
Wat Phanan Choeng, founded in Ayodhya during the reign of Sai Nam Peung (r. 1111–1165)

Ayodhya, previously known as Mueang Wat Derm or Mueang Nong Son, was founded in 934 by a monk from Mueang Bang Than (บางทาน) in present-day Kamphaeng Phet. (Note: Calculated from the text given in the chronicle: "สิ้น 97 ปีสวรรคต ศักราชได้ 336 ปี พระยาโคดมได้ครองราชสมบัติอยู่ ณ วัดเดิม 30 ปี" which is transcribed as "...at the age of 97, he passed away in the year 336 of the Chula Sakarat. Phraya Kodom reigned in the Mueang Wat Derm for 30 years...".) Most of its inhabitants are supposed to have come from Ayodhyapura after its fall in 946, and from Lavapura after Angkor destroyed that city in 1001. That population, and a site commanding the Chao Phraya River trade routes, brought rapid growth. In the 1080s Ayodhya became the new capital of Lavo. The Xiān (暹) of Chinese and Đại Việt texts between 1149 and the foundation of the Ayutthaya Kingdom in 1351 may be Ayodhya rather than Sukhothai, Suphannabhum or another of the early Siamese polities.

Xiān is recorded as having attacked Champa, Dān mǎ xī (單馬錫, taken to be Tumasik, or Singapore), Xī lǐ (昔里), Ma-li-yü-êrh (Melayu), and Samudera Pasai Sultanate on Sumatra before the formation of Ayutthaya Kingdom. A bas-relief of about the same period at Angkor Wat shows mercenaries of the Khmer army labelled syam-kuk, perhaps "of the land of Siam". Their ethnolinguistic affiliation cannot be established, though many scholars have taken them for Siamese.

As opposed to the early assumptions, the modern consensus of scholars, like Vittorio Roveda, B.P. Groslier, Saveros Pou, and Michael Vickery, is that the 12th century marching “Syam Kuk” relief on Angkor Wat are not the Tai/Siamese (ethnic Thai). Vickery also rejects claims that “syām” comes from the Sanskrit śyāma, meaning “dark” (as in “dark complexioned”). He instead documents Syam, Sien, Siam, and the Chinese Hsien used by the Cham, Khmer, and Chinese to explain syām kuk doesn’t refer to an ethnic group but a geographic location, specifically the southern central plains of modern Thailand, that was populated by the Mon-Khmer in the 12th century.

After two centuries of devastation the region was at peace in the 12th century. Artefacts and ruins of the 12th and 13th centuries indicate migration from the surrounding regions, Khmer from the east, Mon from the west and Tai–Mon from the north. Several modern mandalas then emerged, such as Suphannabhum, Phrip Phri, Sukhothai, and Ayutthaya. Phiset Jiajanphong puts Lavo behind one of them. On his reading the state backed the founding of Mueang Sukhothai after 1157, as a place to gather forest products from deep inland. These moved to the larger town at Lopburi and entered the export trade.

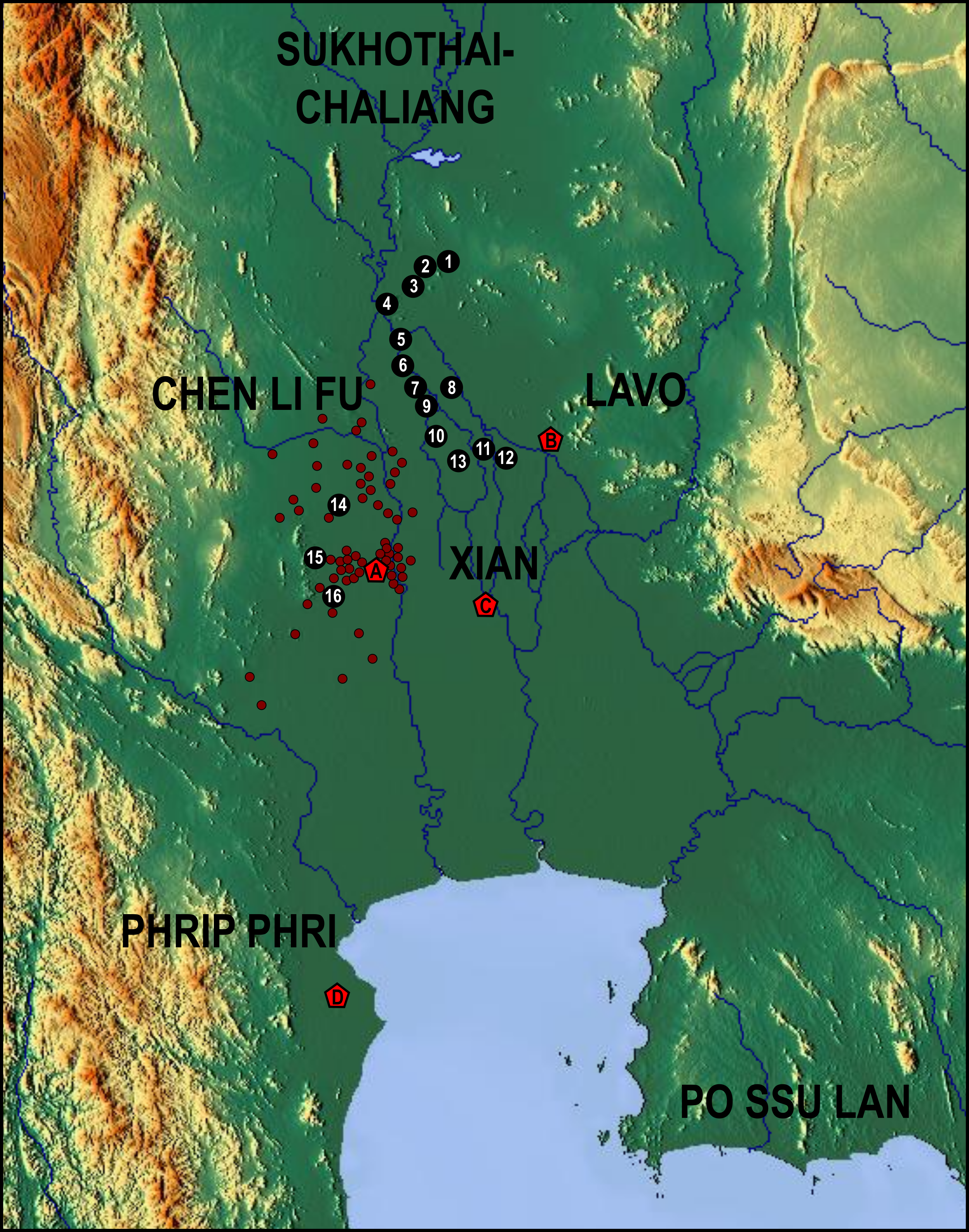
Lower Menam Valley in the 12th and 13th centuries, showing the key polities under Siamese Chen Li Fu (numbers 1 to 16) and its smaller settlements (grey pogs), as proposed by Walailak Songsiri.

After Phra Chao Luang (พระเจ้าหลวง) won the two-year Ayodhya succession struggle of 1087–1088, he was enthroned as the king. He had no male heir, and married his only daughter to Sai Nam Peung (สายน้ำผึ้ง), son of Kesariraja who was of Mon's Chaliang and Tai's Chiang Saen lineages and served as the Lavapura king at that time. Their descendants, later known as the Uthong (Lavo) dynasty, continued to rule Ayodhya until the Ayutthaya Kingdom formation in 1351.

At Lavapura itself the throne stood vacant, or was held by unrecorded kings, from 1087 until 1106, when Kesariraja of Si Satchanalai took the seat. Angkor moved to recover its influence in 1181, when Jayavarman VII appointed his kinsman Narupatidnavarman to govern Lavapura. Due to this political pressure, a Tai ruler Sri Thammasokkarat (ศรีธรรมโศกราช), who was also from Si Satchanalai, fled to Nakhon Si Thammarat. Sri Thammasokkarat married a princess of Dhanyapura (Dong Mae Nang Mueang in the present-day Nakhon Sawan province), and their descendants ruled Tambralinga until the late 13th century. Zhou Daguan, who travelled to Angkor with a Yuan embassy in 1296–97, reports in The Customs of Cambodia that the Siamese were influential in Lavo's Lavapura and present in large numbers in the Angkorian capital of Yaśodharapura. Cœdès had recorded a son of Jayavarman VII holding Lopburi under the style "prince of Lavo", and Songsiri reads such arrangements as evidence of kinship between ruling houses rather than of administration.

Angkorian authority in the basin was not uniform. Walailak Songsiri holds that Chen Li Fu to the west stood outside it, and reads the Khmer titles and Indic royal names borne in the western basin as court usage adopted for dealings with China rather than as marks of subordination. She questions the reading of Lavo's own subjection as well, and notes that in the study Cœdès published with Jean Boisselier in 1965 he no longer derived Suryavarman I from Nakhon Si Thammarat and treated Lopburi art as descended from Dvaravati work rather than imported from Cambodia.

The Preah Khan inscription names Lopburi Lavodayapura. The name stands at verse 116, among twenty-three places that each received one image of Jayabuddhamahanatha. Verse 159 of the same text puts the number at twenty-five, which Thomas Maxwell, who edited the inscription, takes to mean that two more were set up while the text was being composed. Maxwell locates none of the twenty-three. How far Angkorian authority reached is disputed. The hospitals (arogyasala) and fire houses built along the roads out of Angkor reach no further west than Prachin Buri. That suggests the same inscription's dispatch of the image Jayabuddhamahanatha to six Menam polities was cultural diplomacy rather than direct control. The inscription counts 121 fire houses in all: fifty-seven on the roads towards Champa, seventeen on the road to Vimāyapura (Phimai), forty-four on a circuit through Jayavatī, Jayasiṃhavatī, Jayavāravatī, Jayarājagiri and Suvīrapurī, and three standing singly. Maxwell locates none of the five places on the circuit and gives no direction for it. Angkor recovered Lavo after Sri Dharmasokaraja I left, and the Prasat Tor inscription has Jayavarman VII defeat a monarch of the west in 1189/90 or 1195/96. At Mueang Sing in Kanchanaburi, archaeologists suggest that only the master craftsmen came from Angkor or from Lavodayapura, the rest of the work being local. Songsiri takes the radiating Avalokiteśvara images from Mueang Sing, Mueang Sa Kosi Narai and Lopburi to be Angkorian work or the work of court-trained craftsmen, and places the arrival of Angkorian religious forms in the western basin in the second half of the 13th century, after Jayavarman VII's reign.

Prang Sam Yot was built during this period. However, Lavapura was probably taken back by a Tai royal from Phraek Si Racha (แพรกศรีราชา; present-day Sankhaburi) in the 13th century. Angkor's power waned in this period amid weak rule and feuding at the capital. The same turmoil is given as the background to Sukhothai's emergence in 1238.

Wars with Haripuñjaya continued through the 12th century. Lopburi, then held by a Mon–Tai clan from Chaliang, marched north several times without success. At the end of the century Lopburi again fell under Angkor. How far that reached is disputed. Chris Baker and Pasuk Phongpaichit hold that the relationship was probably always somewhat flexible, and that the Chao Phraya plain has yielded none of the temple-endowment inscriptions characteristic of Angkorian provinces. Wyatt surveys the sixteen dated inscriptions of 1168 to 1219 and finds no indication of Angkorian political or administrative power in those from Lopburi and Grahi, while Pracinburi and the Khorat Plateau remain within it; he adds that the absence is not conclusive. The Lopburi inscription of 1213, seven lines of Khmer on the back of a headless stone Buddha, records only the making of the image by one Candasvāratana, with a Nāga-hood posture and the planting of a pipal tree, and reckons time wholly in the Khmer manner, with no trace of the Tai system used six years later in the Phrae valley. Lavo, as Lo-hu, joined Ny Wang in an embassy to China in 1289 and sent one alone in 1299, though Baker and Pasuk count four Lavo missions across those eleven years rather than two. In 1349 Xiān and Lo-hu were joined, and the Chinese named the new polity Xiānluó (暹羅). The notices of that year run both ways, one having Xiān submit to Luó hú and another having Xiān bring Luó hú to submission, a discrepancy Baker and Pasuk attribute to copying error. Xiān might also refer to the Suphannaphum Kingdom of Suphanburi Province.

=== Formation of the Ayutthaya Kingdom: 1351 ===
Before the union each of the four towns of the lower plain had sent missions to China in its own name, Ayodhya as Xian, Lavo as Luohu, Suphan Buri as Sumenbang and Phetchaburi as Pichaburi. In 1351 Uthong and Borommarachathirat I of Suphannabhum (modern Suphan Buri) founded the Ayutthaya Kingdom on an island where the Chao Phraya, Lopburi and Pa Sak meet, though Baker and Pasuk have only the Lopburi running beside the site at the time. Uthong became king of the city. Borommarachathirat I then took Ayutthaya from Uthong's son Ramesuan in 1370, and Ramesuan retreated to Lavo. In 1388 Ramesuan retook the city from Borommarachathirat I's son Thong Lan. Borommarachathirat I's nephew Intharachathirat took Ayutthaya back for the Suphannaphum dynasty in 1408. The Uthong dynasty was then purged and reduced to a noble family of Ayutthaya until the 16th century.

There are many theories about Uthong's origin. Baker and Pasuk count at least seven, and note that beyond his role as founder the chronicles record little about him but the year of his death. Chula Chakrabongse thought him a descendant of Mangrai. Van Vliet's chronicles, a seventeenth-century work, stated that King Uthong was a Chinese merchant who established himself at Phetchaburi before moving to Ayutthaya. Tamnan Mulla Satsana, a sixteenth-century Lanna text, states that King Uthong was from the Lavo Kingdom.

Lavo became a major Ayutthayan stronghold after the kingdom's foundation in the 14th century. The Instructions Given to the Siamese Envoys Sent to Portugal of 1684 has Lavapuri, or Lopburi, abandoned around the 15th century. Narai made it a royal capital in the mid-17th century and resided there some eight months a year.

== Society and economy ==
Archaeological survey counts Lopburi among the secondary centres of the 107 Dvaravati-associated urban sites recorded in present-day Thailand, below Nakhon Pathom, Suphanburi and Phraek Si Racha. The Tongdian credits Dvaravati with six markets, and Lopburi is one of the places proposed for them.

Chinese accounts of the 13th and 14th centuries treat Lavo as the agricultural base of the lower valley. The Xin Yuanshi contrasts the dry ground of Xiān with Lavo's broad and well-watered plain, on which Xiān was said to depend. It describes the method of cultivation. A large river ran from Xiān through Lavo to the sea, and each summer sea water pushed up into its inland reaches, so that seed sown at that season rose with the water, a foot of growth for every foot the river rose, and ripened as the water fell. Seed was sown but the ground was not ploughed, which the account gives as the reason grain was plentiful and cheap. The same source states that Lavo and Xiān had both formed part of Funan. The Ming shi-lu preserves the contrast in another form, recording that Xiān was later divided into two countries, Lavo and Xiān, and that the barren soil of Xiān left it dependent on Lavo's level plain for supplies; Baker and Pasuk attribute the poor soil to the marshy and saline conditions of the lower delta, noting Ma Huan's report of 1433 that the land was wet and swampy.

Wang Dayuan's Daoyi Zhilue of 1351 adds a description of custom. Men and women wore the hair in a topknot, wrapped the head in cotton and wore a long robe; salt was boiled from sea water and liquor fermented from glutinous rice; and the ruler had ordered that cowrie shells serve in place of coin. It records that decisions in matters of money, of grain and of travel rested with the women, whom it describes as more decisive than the men. The people of Xiān are said to have followed the same customs. Its entry on Lavo carries the agricultural contrast as well, calling the paddy fields level and well watered and saying that the people of Xiān rely on them. Yoneo Ishii read the salt-boiling as an indication that Lavo reached the sea at some point, and grouped it with Xiān and Su-men-bang as mainland instances of the upstream–downstream coastal state modelled by Bennet Bronson.

Chit Phumisak, writing within a Marxist framework, held that Lavo had the most developed system of bound labour among the small states of the basin, though he judged it a modest polity beside those of the Khorat Plateau south of the Mun River. He attributed the scarcity of standing remains to the site itself. Lopburi has never been relocated in a thousand years, so successive building has covered what came before, leaving little beyond the sanctuary at San Phra Kan and Phra Prang Sam Yot. He also treated Lavo as a centre of learning and of trade, citing the tradition that Phaya Ruang of Sukhothai and Phaya Ngam Mueang of Phayao studied under one teacher there, and a riddle in which a hoe is identified by its origin in Lavo, which he took as a sign that the city supplied iron implements across the region. The Mūlasāsanā names Lavo and Ayojjhapura as such centres in the early 14th century, and the Annals of the North date the studies of the two princes to 1254, neither of them there for ordination. Wyatt takes the tradition as a caution against reading later political identities backwards, since Ram Khamhaeng was a son of the man who had taken Sukhothai and would on a modern reading have been studying in enemy country; what the princes were affirming, on his account, was an affinity with a Khmer-speaking but Theravada world.

How far Lavo stood inside Angkorian authority in the 13th century is argued from a small number of notices. The Annals of the North describe an Angkorian Siam of five regions, Lavo, Suvarṇabhūmī, Śrī Dhammanagara, Chaliangraṭṭha and Haripuñjaya; the Chinese Zhu Fan Zhi of 1225 lists Lavo among the dependencies of Angkor. David K. Wyatt distrusts the second, observing that he cannot see how Angkor might have controlled Tambralinga in that year without also controlling Grahi, and that Chinese compilations of the kind sometimes copied earlier writers uncritically. He also notes that Lavo is unmentioned in the Chinese record between 1225 and 1289, when it sent tribute on its own account. The Khmer title kamrateng was borne in the same period by the rulers of Chen Li Fu, Phrip Phri and Sukhothai as well as by those of Lavo. A further trace of the city in the epigraphy is the name Cāmbūka, found on a Dvaravati-style Buddha recovered at Lopburi, which George Cœdès connected with the city of Śambhūkapaṭṭana named in the Preah Khan inscription of 1191 and on that evidence placed no more precisely than in the Menam valley.

== List of rulers ==
=== Before 11th century: Lavapura as seat ===
Following the annexation of Funan in 627, Chenla, Cān Bàn, and Zhū Jiāng allied via royal intermarriage. They then waged several wars against Tou Yuan to the northwest and Línyì to the northeast. However, in 647, Tou Yuan instead became a vassal of Dvaravati, and was then re-established as the Lavo Kingdom the following year.

Name		Reign	Notes
English	Thai	Reign	Notes
Chá-shīlì Pó-mò-pó-nà 察失利 婆末婆那		c. 644	As king of Tou Yuan
The Tou Yuan Kingdom was annexed by Dvaravati's Kamalanka in 647 and was refounded as the Lavo Kingdom in 648.
Kalavarnadisharaja	กาฬวรรดิษฐ์	648–700	Founder. Moved the seat from Nakhon Pathom (Takkasila) to Lavo. Also son of Takkasila's king, Kakabhadra.
Balipatijaya (Note: The sources say Balidhiraja overthrew the former ruler at Nakhon Chai Si and assigned his younger son, Sai Thong Som, as the new ruler and then enthroned his elder son, Balipatijaya, as the new king of Nakhon Luang. See the interpretation on Nakhon Luang at Pra Poa Noome Thele Seri.)	ภาลีบดีชัย	700–?	Grandson of the previous. Son of Balidhiraja, king of Sukhothai
Woodward proposed that Si Thep exercised some control over Lopburi, Nakhon Pathom, U Thong and Khu Bua during the early 8th century.
Nāyaka Ārjava	อารชวะ	c. mid 8th century	Son of the lord of Śāmbuka (Nakhon Pathom). Last recorded ruler of the line linked by descent to Nakhon Pathom. His own dates are approximate, and no ruler is named again until Vasudeva.
Under the 1st Indaprasthanagara		?–800	Under the rule of Padumasuriyavamsa
Unknown		800–861?	
Vasudeva	วาสุเทพ	861–?	Tai Yuan monarch from the north.
Prince of Kamphaeng Phet		Late 9th c.	Son of Bhūpati (ภูบดี), the ruler of Kamphaeng Phet
Uchitthaka Chakkawat	อุฉิฎฐกะจักรวรรดิ	?–927	Later became King of Haripuñjaya from 927 to 930.
During the wars against Haripuñjaya in 927, Lavo's capital Lavapura was captured by King of Tambralinga.
Sujita	สุชิตราช	927–930	Also King of Tambralinga. As a tributary state of Tambralinga.
Kampoch	กัมโพช	930–946?	Son of the previous. As a tributary state of Tambralinga.
In 946, the Angkorian king Rajendravarman II won over Rāmaññadesa (lit. 'country of the Mon', potentially the eastern Menam valley, centered at Si Thep and Lavapura).
Under the 3rd Indaprasthanagara		c. 950s–993	Under the rule of Sindhob Amarin of Phraek Si Racha
Under the 3rd Indaprasthanagara		Late 10th–early 11th c.	Under the rule of Sunthorathet of Phraek Si Racha
Sunthorathet moved the seat from Indaprasthanagara to Yassouttora Nacoora Louang; by the beginning of the 11th century, Lavapura was described as deserted.
Around 1005, Lavo was obtained by the Angkorian usurper Suryavarman I.
Lakshmipativarman	ศรีลักษมีปติวรมัน	1006 or 1011–? (Note: The date 1006 follows the secondary literature. Inscription K.1198, dated 1014, first records him receiving land at Madhyadeśa in 1009 and places his appointment to govern Rāmanya after the suppression of a rebellion in 1011, which would put his governorship of Lavapura between 1011 and 1014.)	As the governor, appointed by Suryavarman I
Laparaja	ลพราช		Period of constant wars against Haripuñjaya.
Unknown		?–1052?	Son of the previous.
Following the reign of Suryavarman I, Angkor experienced a series of attempted rebellions between 1050 and 1080. In 1052, Lavo passed out of Angkorian control when it was conquered by Haripuñjaya.
Chandrachota	จันทรโชติ	1052–1069	Prince of Suphannabhum who fled to Haripuñjaya after Suphannabhum was seized by Tambralinga between the 920s to 940s.
Regent		1069–1082	
Around the 1080s, the capital was shifted southward to Ayodhya by King Narai I, the old capital was then renamed Lopburi

=== After 11th century: Ayodhya as seat ===
This epoch is known as the Pre-Ayutthaya, or Ayodhya, period. The polity centred in Ayodhya was referred to as Xiān in Chinese and Đại Việt texts, whereas the polity located in Lopburi continued to be referred to as Lavo.

Xian rulers Seat: Ayodhya		Reign	Lavo rulers Seat: Lopburi		Reign
English	Thai	Reign	English	Thai	Reign
Narai I	พระนารายณ์	1082–1087	Narai I	พระนารายณ์	1082–mid 1080s
two-year power struggle following the invasion by Pagan			Unknown		mid 1080s–1106?
Phra Chao Luang (Note: Lavo noble with unknown origin)	พระเจ้าหลวง	1089–1111	King Shridhammatripitaka of Chiang Saen seized Lopburi in 1106.		
Sai Nam Peung	สายน้ำผึ้ง	1111–1165	Kesariraja	ไกรศรราช	1106–1110s
Xiān – Đại Việt trade relations established in 1149.			Sri Dharmasokaraja I (also at Suphannabhum–Phraek)	ศรีธรรมโศกราชที่ 1	1110s–1117
Dhammikaraja	พระเจ้าธรรมิกราชา	1165–1205	Lavo sent tribute to China in 1115. Then became under Angkor in 1117.		
Xiān sent tribute to Đại Việt in 1182.			Sri Jayasinghavarman (Suryavarman II)	กัมรเตง อัญ ศรีชัยสิงหวรมัน	1117–1154
Uthong II	พระเจ้าอู่ทอง	1205–1253	Lavo gained independence and sent tribute to China in 1155		
Jayasena	พระเจ้าชัยเสน	1253–1289	Sri Dharmasokaraja II (also king of Tambralinga–Indaprasthanagara)	ศรีธรรมโศกราชที่ 2	1155 or 1157–1180 (Note: Possibly evacuated to Tambralinga.)
Suvarnaraja	พระเจ้าสุวรรณราชา	1289–1301	Sri Dharmasokaraja II (also king of Tambralinga–Indaprasthanagara)	ศรีธรรมโศกราชที่ 2	1155 or 1157–1180
Xiān began to invade Angkor and Melayu in the 1290s.			During the reign of Jayavarman VII (r.1181–1218), (Note: Potentially 1210s, during the late period of Pra Poa Noome Thele Seri.) Angkor regained Lavapura.		
Xiān sent tributes to China five times during 1292 to 1299.			Nripendravarman (Indravarman II) (Note: Appointed by Jayavarman VII (r.1181–1218))	นฤปตีนทรวรมัน	1180–1218 (Note: Succeeded his Angkorian father, Jayavarman VII, who died in 1218.)
Dhammaraja	พระเจ้าธรรมราชา	1301–1310	Pha Mueang (Srindrapatindraditya)?	ผาเมือง?	1218?–?
Baramaraja	พระบรมราชา	1310–1344	Lavo gained independence following the weak rule at Angkor in the 1280s.		
1313–1315 Xiān invasion of Champa			Phraek Si Racha king (unknown regnal title), possibly either a descendant of Ai the eldest son of Uthong II, or Śiricandrarāja in the Lan Xang Chronicle		1283–1319
Xiān sent tributes to China in 1314, 1319 and 1323.			Lavo sent five tributes to China between 1289 and 1299.		
Ramathibodi I (Uthong V) (Also the first king of Ayutthaya Kingdom)	พระรามาธิบดีที่ 1	1344–1369	Maternal grandfather of Ramesuan		1319?–1351
Ramathibodi I (Uthong V) (Also the first king of Ayutthaya Kingdom)	พระรามาธิบดีที่ 1	1344–1369	Ramesuan	ราเมศวร	1351? (Note: After his father, Ramathibodi I, was enthroned as the King of Ayutthaya.)–1388
After Ayutthaya Kingdom was officially established in 1351, Lavo was annexed into Ayutthaya in 1388.

== See also ==
- Locach
- History of Lopburi
