= Noen Kham subdistrict =

Noen Kham Thai: เนินขาม
- Tambon
- Etymology: "Mound of Tamarinds"
- Interactive map of Noen Kham
- Coordinates: 14°58′8.05″N 99°53′26.32″E
- Country: Thailand
- Province: Chai Nat
- District: Noen Kham
- Named for: Local geography

Government
  - Type: Subdistrict Municipality
  - Mayor: Charoon Chindarat
  - Deputy Mayor: Wihan Saenaun
  - Deputy Mayor: Damrongsak Kaeosuk

Population (2019)
  - Total: 6,040
  - Density: 52.03/km^{2} (134.8/sq mi)
- Time zone: UTC+7 (ICT)
- Postcode: 17130
- Area code: (+66) 02

Noen Kham (Thai: เนินขาม, pronounced [nɤ̄ːn kʰǎːm]) also known as Ban Noen Kham (บ้านเนินขาม, pronounced [bâːn nɤ̄ːn kʰǎːm]) is a tambon in Noen Kham district, Chai Nat province, Thailand.

== History ==
The original ethnic group of Noen Kham is Lao Wiang who migrated from Vientiane since King Nangklao (Rama III)'s reign during the early Rattanakosin period, more than 200 years ago. They first settled in Ban Khok Kham, U Thong district, Suphan Buri province. When the community expanded, they migrated to settle here.

The name Noen Kham literally means "mound of tamarinds" what with it is a place where there are many tamarind trees. It is a distortion of the word Khok Kham (โคกขาม, pronounced [kʰôːk kʰǎːm]) which has the same meaning.

== Geography ==
The terrain is a lowland and a plateau at the foothill in the northeast.

== Administration ==
The entire area is under the management of Noen Kham Subdistrict Municipality.

It is further divided into 19 administrative mubans (villages).

No.	Name	Thai
1.	Ban Noen Kham	บ้านเนินขาม
2.	Ban Noen Kham	บ้านเนินขาม
3.	Ban Nong Haeo	บ้านหนองแห้ว
4.	Ban Nong Sala	บ้านหนองศาลา
5.	Ban Nong Rakham	บ้านหนองระกำ
6.	Ban Noen Kham	บ้านเนินขาม
7.	Ban Hua To	บ้านหัวตอ
8.	Ban Noi	บ้านน้อย
9.	Ban Thung	บ้านทุ่ง
10.	Ban Khao Round Tian Thong	บ้านเขาราวเทียนทอง
11.	Ban Klang	บ้านกลาง
12.	Ban Pong Mang	บ้านโป่งมั่ง
13.	Ban Nong Kaen Ma-khlua	บ้านหนองแก่นมะเกลือ
14.	Ban Thung	บ้านทุ่ง
15.	Ban Nong Manao	บ้านหนองมะนาว
16.	Ban Rang Kradone	บ้านรังกระโดน
17.	Ban Thung Mai	บ้านทุ่งใหม่
18.	Ban Pong Kamphaeng	บ้านโป่งกำแพง
19.	Ban Lan Du	บ้านลานดู่

== Demography ==
The majority of the Lao Wiang ethnic group lives in Ban Non Kham. They still preserve some of their ethnic identities, such as their form of speech, food, or the patterns of local woven fabrics.

As of 2019, it has a total population of 6,040 (2,900 males, 3,140 females).

== Economy ==
Agriculture is the main source of income for the area. Weaving local fabrics is the work of women.
