= Chao Phraya Dam =

Dam in Sapphaya, Chai Nat, Thailand

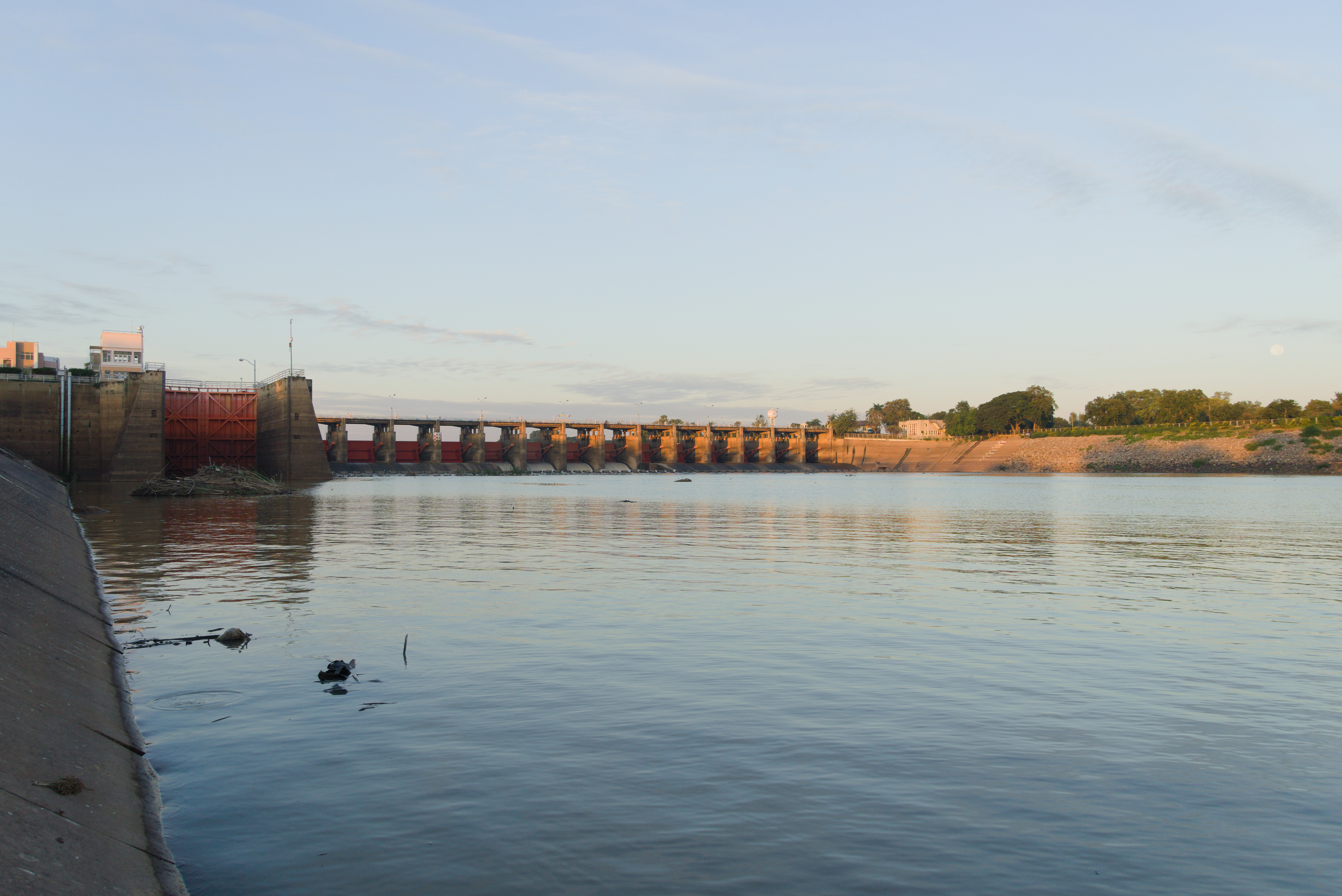

- Location in Thailand
- Interactive map of Chao Phraya Dam
- Country: Thailand
- Location: Sapphaya, Chai Nat
- Coordinates: 15°09′29″N 100°10′48″E
- Construction began: 1952
- Opening date: 1957
- Owner: Royal Irrigation Department

Dam and spillways
- Type of dam: Barrage
- Impounds: Chao Phraya River

The Chao Phraya Dam (Thai: เขื่อนเจ้าพระยา, RTGS: Khuean Chao Phraya, pronounced [kʰɯ̀a̯n t͡ɕâːw pʰrā.jāː]) is a barrage dam in Sapphaya district, Chai Nat province, Thailand. It regulates the flow of the Chao Phraya River as it passes into lower central Thailand, distributing water to an area of 11,600 square kilometres (4,500 sq mi) in seventeen provinces as part of the Greater Chao Phraya Irrigation Project. The dam has sixteen 12.5-metre gates. It was built between 1952 and 1957.
