= Ny Wang =

13th centuries political entity

Ny Wang Kingdom 女王國 (Chinese) Nǚ-wáng Guó
- c. 9th – late 13th century
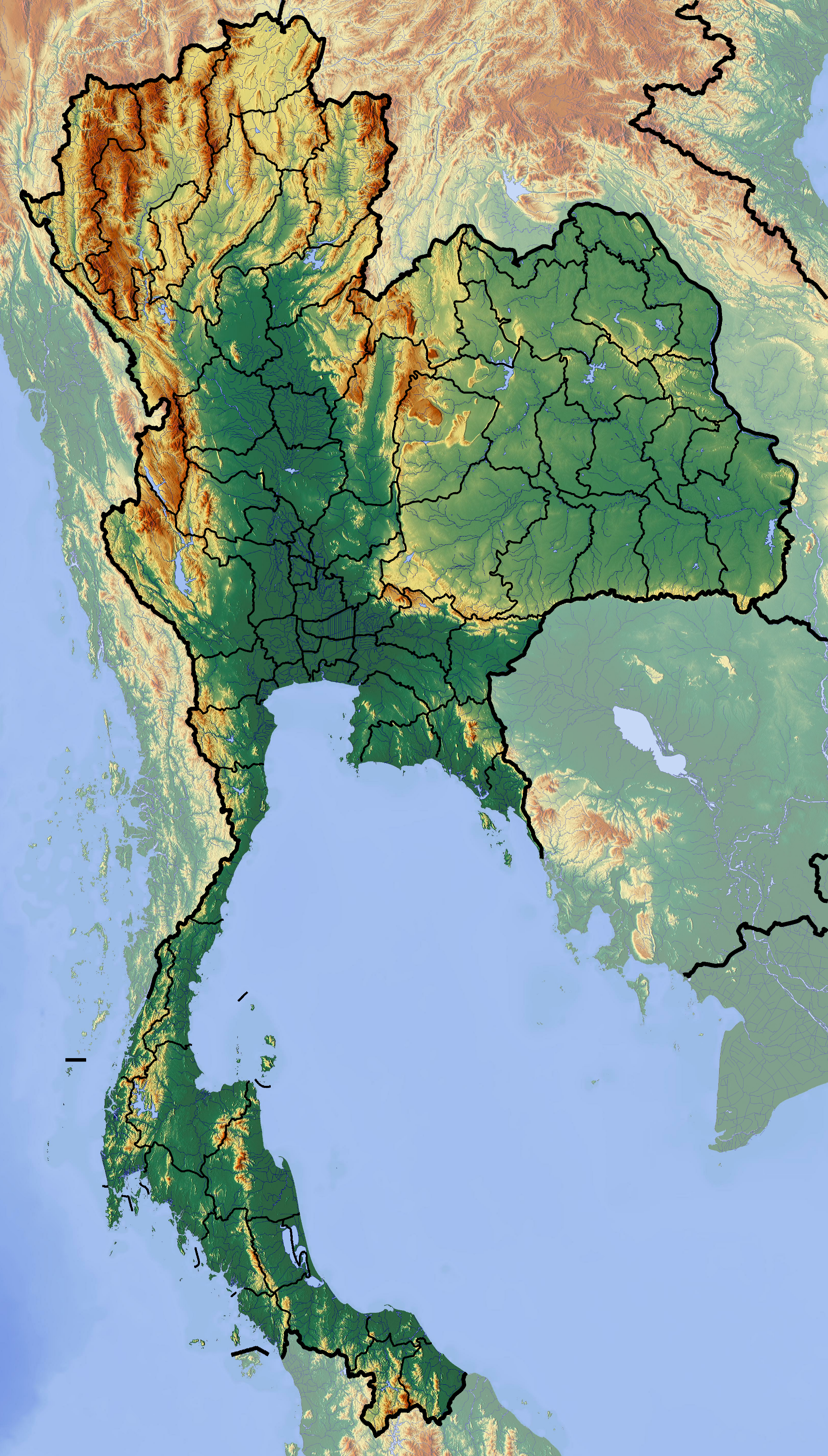
- Location of Ny Wang cursorily speculated by Gordon Luce
- Common languages: Austric
- Government: Monarchy
- Historical era: Post-classical era
  - First mentioned in Chinese record: 9th century
  - Send tribute to China: 1289

Ny Wang or Nü-wang (Chinese: 女王) was an ancient political entity mentioned in the Chinese records in the late 9th and 13th centuries, located in either the central Mekong valley of Laos and Thailand or northern Thailand. It was said to be ruled by the queen and possibly is of the Austric-speaking people as matriarchal regimes certainly existed. In the Chinese record Man-chu 蛮书 written by Fán chuò 樊绰, the kingdom was attacked by 20,000 Man people but won. The Man (蠻) is non-Chinese peoples in southern China throughout history, which considered barbarian. In this case, probably was the troop of Nanzhao.

Ny Wang joined Lavo Kingdom in sending an embassy to the Yuan dynasty during the reign of Kublai Khan in 1289. This make Thai academics hypothesize that Ny Wang was possibly the Haripuñjaya kingdom, whose ruled by the Lavo's princess, Jamadevi, in the beginning of the establishment, whereas Gordon Luce speculates that Haripuñjaya was probably K'un-lun mentions in the Man-chu.

== Location ==
Its exact location remains unclear. According to the details given in the Chinese record, Ny Wang is 10-day stages far from the west of Huan-chou near the present-Hà Tĩnh in Vietnam, and over 30 stages from the Chên-nan chieh-tu on the Man's Nanzhao border, possibly in present central Yunnan. Its border meets Chenla in the south. Gordon Luce speculates that it is probably located in the middle Mekong Valley at the great bend east of Vieng Chan.
