= Chai Nat Bird Park =

Bird sanctuary and provincial park in Thailand

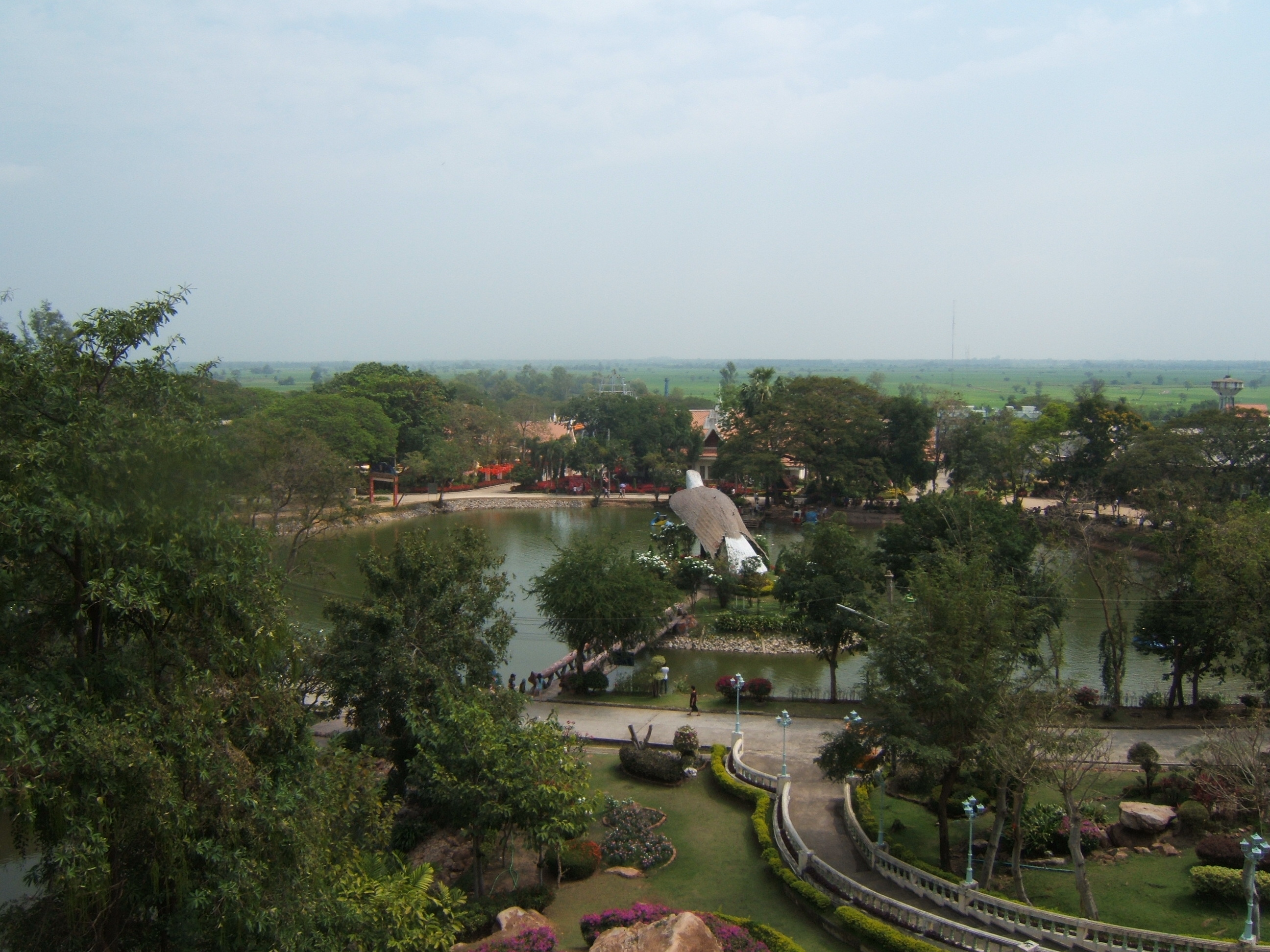

Chai Nat Bird Park or Chai Nat Zoo is a large bird sanctuary and provincial park in Chai Nat Province, Thailand. It contains over 100 bird species living in simulated surroundings which match their natural habitats and additionally 60 cages of birds. The two highlights of the park are the vast bird cage, which is the largest aviary in Asia, and a freshwater fish aquarium.

== Location ==
The park is located in Khao Tha Phra Sub-District, Mueng Chainat District, Thailand.

== History ==
The Chai Nat Bird Park was built in 1983 and first covered an area of 19.76 acres. At present, the park has been developed and extended to be 98 acres. It has become a major attraction and is a source of tourism income for Chai Nat Province.

== Features ==
The main highlight of the park is the giant aviary that is the largest aviary in Asia. In addition, there are 63 cages of birds contain rare species such as Sarus Cranes, Green Peafowls, Eagles, Falcons, Hawks, and Ravens. Beside the birds, the park also has the Bird Egg Museum that contains many eggs from various species of birds found around the world.

Other offerings of the park are the man-made waterfalls, gardens, a rabbit park, and a zoo. There are several wild animals present in the zoo such as Hog Deer, Elk Deer, and Mountain Goats. The other important highlight of the park is an aquarium which features several types of freshwater fish species found in Chao Phraya River. Lastly, the Space WaterPark is a zone that has a giant waterslide.
