= Noen Kham district =

Noen Kham เนินขาม
- District
- District location in Chai Nat province
- Coordinates: 14°57′44″N 99°54′42″E
- Country: Thailand
- Province: Chai Nat
- Seat: Noen Kham
- District established: 1997

Area
  - Total: 270.0 km^{2} (104.2 sq mi)

Population (2008)
  - Total: 17,371
  - Density: 64.6/km^{2} (167/sq mi)
- Time zone: UTC+7 (ICT)
- Postal code: 17130
- Geocode: 1808

Noen Kham (Thai: เนินขาม, pronounced [nɤ̄ːn kʰǎːm]) is the southwesternmost district (amphoe) of Chai Nat province, central Thailand.

== History ==
The two tambons Noen Kham and Kabok Tia of Hankha district were separated and created the new minor district (king amphoe) on 1 July 1997.

On 15 May 2007, all 81 minor districts were upgraded to full districts. With publication in the Royal Gazette on 24 August the upgrade became official.

== Geography ==
Neighboring districts are (from the north clockwise) Hankha of Chainat Province; Doem Bang Nang Buat and Dan Chang of Suphanburi province; and Ban Rai of Uthai Thani province.

== Administration ==
The district is divided into three sub-districts (tambons), which are further subdivided into 48 villages (mubans). There are no municipal (thesaban) areas, and three tambon administrative organizations (TAO).

| No. | Name | Thai | Pop. |
|---|---|---|---|---|
| 1. | Noen Kham | เนินขาม | 19 | 6,355 |
| 2. | Kabok Tia | กะบกเตี้ย | 15 | 5,523 |
| 3. | Suk Duean Ha | สุขเดือนห้า | 14 | 5,493 |
