= Balipatijaya =

King of Lavo

Balipatijaya ภาลีบดีชัย
- King of Lavo

King of Lavo
- Reign: 700–?
- Predecessor: Kalavarnadisharaja
- Successor: Nāyaka Ārjava
- Born: Lopburi
- Died: Mid 8th-c. Lopburi
- House: Lavo dynasty
- Father: Balidhiraja

Balipatijaya (Thai: ภาลีบดีชัย, RTGS: Phalibadichai) was an 8th-century Mon monarch attested in the Legend of the Arhat (Thai: ตำนานนิทานพระอรหันต์, RTGS: Tamnan Nithan Phra Arahan). He was the elder son of Balidhiraja, the king of Sukhothai, and the grandson of Kalavarnadisharaja. Balipatijaya ascended to the throne at Lavo in 700 CE following the reign of his grandfather. The available sources provide no information regarding his immediate successor.

Balipatijaya had one sibling, a younger brother named Sai Thong Som, who was born to a Tai queen consort of Balidhiraja. Sai Thong Som was appointed by his father to govern Devapura of Dvaravati after Balidhiraja deposed the preceding ruler circa 687 CE.

During the reign of Balipatijaya in the 8th century, Dvaravati experienced a decline in political influence. According to the Cefu Yuangui, a polity referred to as Gē Luó Shě Fēn conquered the region west of Dvaravati, specifically the western Menam Valley. This designation is regarded as a corrupted rendering of Jiā Luó Shě Fú, which has been interpreted as Canasapura, identified with Qiān Zhī Fú and associated with Si Thep as its center, while Mueang Sema functioned as an important regional stronghold.
