= Hankha district =

Hankha หันคา
- District
- District location in Chai Nat province
- Coordinates: 14°58′52″N 100°0′53″E
- Country: Thailand
- Province: Chai Nat
- Seat: Hankha

Area
  - Total: 529.33 km^{2} (204.38 sq mi)

Population (2005)
  - Total: 56,394
  - Density: 106.5/km^{2} (276/sq mi)
- Time zone: UTC+7 (ICT)
- Postal code: 17130
- Geocode: 1806

Hankha (Thai: หันคา, pronounced [hǎn.kʰāː]) is a district (amphoe) in the southwestern part of Chai Nat province, central Thailand.

== History ==
At Ban Don Krachon in the district a group of metal votive tablets was found in 1982, buried in a Chinese jar inside a laterite crypt built from the reused stones of an earlier shrine. Walailak Songsiri, surveying the place in December 2024, found it too small to have raised a large sanctuary of its own, and takes the tablets to belong to a wider group of small bronzes buried in jars across the western Chao Phraya plain in the 11th to 13th centuries.

Originally the district was named Doem Bang Kao (เดิมบางเก่า). It was renamed in 1911 to Ban Chian after the central tambon, as the tambon Doem Bang was at the same time reassigned to the newly created Doem Bang District. In 1927 the district office was moved to Hankha market, and in 1939 the district name was changed accordingly to Hankha.

== Geography ==
Neighboring districts are (from the north clockwise) Nong Mamong, Wat Sing, Mueang Chai Nat, and Sankhaburi of Chai Nat Province; Doem Bang Nang Buat of Suphan Buri province; Noen Kham of Chai Nat Province; and Ban Rai of Uthai Thani province.

The important water resource is the Tha Chin River.

== Administration ==
The district is divided into eight sub-districts (tambons), which are further subdivided into 99 villages (mubans). There are two sub-district municipalities (thesaban tambon): Hankha and Sam Ngam Tha Bot each cover parts of tambons of the same name. There are a further eight tambon administrative organizations (TAO).

No.	Name	Thai	Villages	Pop.
1.	Hankha	หันคา	11	10,159
2.	Ban Chian	บ้านเชี่ยน	12	8,976
5.	Phrai Nok Yung	ไพรนกยูง	13	4,923
6.	Nong Saeng	หนองแซง	20	7,643
7.	Huai Ngu	ห้วยงู	11	5,943
8.	Wang Kai Thuean	วังไก่เถื่อน	11	7,828
9.	Den Yai	เด่นใหญ่	11	5,120
11.	Sam Ngam Tha Bot	สามง่ามท่าโบสถ์	10	5,312

Missing numbers are tambon which now form Noen Kham District.
