= Sapphaya district =

Sapphaya สรรพยา
- District
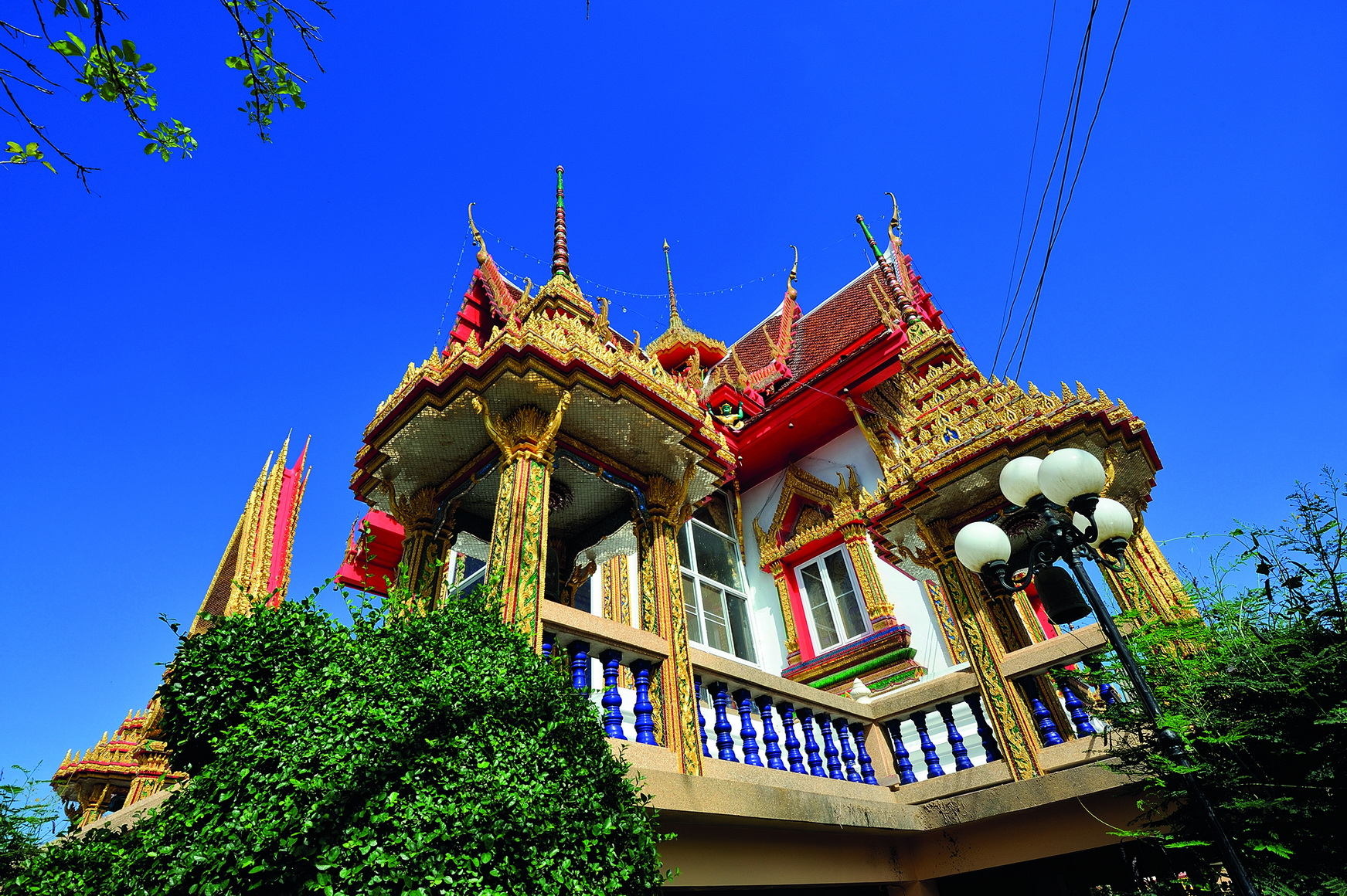
- Wat Intharam in tambon Taluk

- District location in Chai Nat province
- Coordinates: 15°8′15″N 100°14′35″E
- Country: Thailand
- Province: Chai Nat
- Seat: Sapphaya

Area
  - Total: 228.27 km^{2} (88.14 sq mi)

Population (2008)
  - Total: 44,553
  - Density: 195.2/km^{2} (506/sq mi)
- Time zone: UTC+7 (ICT)
- Postal code: 17150
- Geocode: 1804

Sapphaya (Thai: สรรพยา, pronounced [sàp.pʰā.jāː]) is the easternmost district (amphoe) of Chai Nat province, central Thailand. The Chao Phraya Dam lies within the district.

== Naming ==
The district is named after one local hill called "Khao Sapphaya". The word "Sapphaya" can be translated directly as "many kinds of medicines". It is said that when Phra Lak (Lakshman) was hit by Kumbhakan (Kumbhakarna)'s powerful spear until he was fatally injured. Phipek (Vibhishana) had Hanuman fly to search for a magical herb named Sangkorani Trijava (Sanjeevani) comes to cure, this kind of herb only grows on Khao Luang hill. But it was a magic plant that could talk and escape. Hanuman cannot be picked. So he raised the entire mountain of Khao Luang, when flying through this area. A part of mountain fell to the ground and eventually became Khao Sapphaya. The folklore is based on the Ramakien literature, a Thai version of Hindu epic Ramayana.

== Geography ==
Neighbouring districts are (from the southwest clockwise) Sankhaburi and Mueang Chai Nat of Chai Nat province; Takhli of Nakhon Sawan province; and In Buri of Sing Buri province.

== Administration ==
The district is divided into seven sub-districts (tambons), which are further subdivided into 55 villages (mubans). There are six sub-district municipalities (thesaban tambon). Sapphaya covers parts of tambon Sapphaya, and Pho Nang Dam parts of tambon Pho Nang Dam Tok, while Taluk, Pho Nang Dam Ok, Bang Luang, and Hat Asa cover the whole same-named sub-district. There are another three tambon administrative organizations (TAO) covering the non-municipal areas of the sub-districts Supphaya, Khao Kaeo, and Pho Nang Dam Ok.

No.	Name	Thai	Villages	Pop.
1.	Sapphaya	สรรพยา	7	7,144
2.	Taluk	ตลุก	12	8,971
3.	Khao Kaeo	เขาแก้ว	6	3,104
4.	Pho Nang Dam Tok	โพนางดำตก	6	6,764
5.	Pho Nang Dam Ok	โพนางดำออก	8	5,729
6.	Bang Luang	บางหลวง	7	6,063
7.	Hat Asa	หาดอาษา	9	6,778
