= Mueang Chai Nat district =

Mueang Chai Nat เมืองชัยนาท
- District
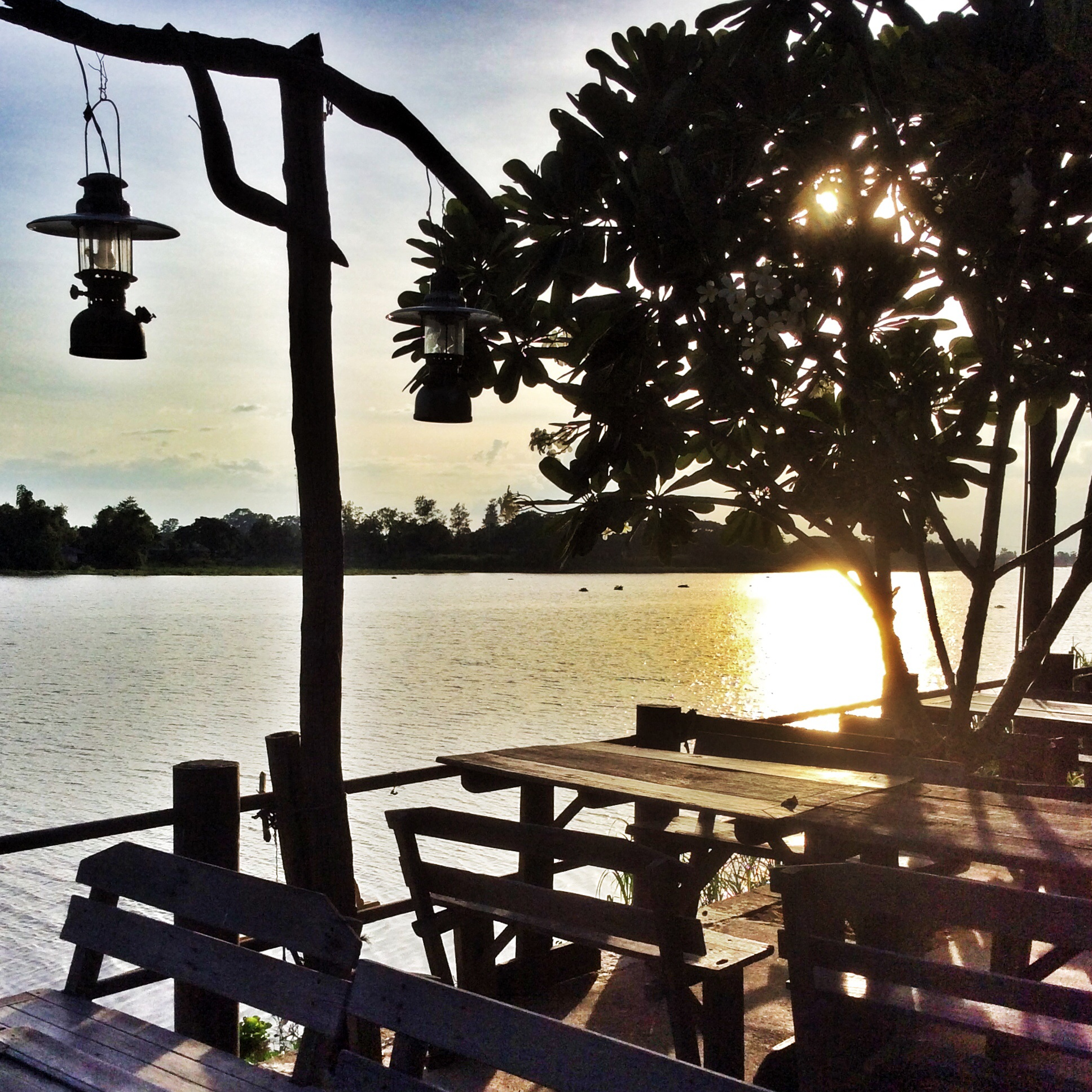
- Chao Phraya River in tambon Ban Kluai, Mueang Chai Nat District

- District location in Chai Nat province
- Coordinates: 15°11′8″N 100°7′26″E
- Country: Thailand
- Province: Chai Nat
- Seat: Nai Mueang

Area
  - Total: 255.377 km^{2} (98.602 sq mi)

Population (2008)
  - Total: 72,031
  - Density: 286.6/km^{2} (742/sq mi)
- Time zone: UTC+7 (ICT)
- Postal code: 17000
- Geocode: 1801

Mueang Chai Nat (Thai: เมืองชัยนาท, pronounced [mɯ̄a̯ŋ t͡ɕʰāj nâːt]) is the capital district (amphoe mueang) of Chai Nat province, central Thailand.

== Geography ==
Neighbouring districts are (from the east clockwise) Sapphaya, Sankhaburi, Hankha, Wat Sing, and Manorom of Chai Nat province; and Takhli of Nakhon Sawan province.

== History ==
On 29 April 1917 the district's name was changed from Mueang to Ban Kluai (บ้านกล้วย). On 14 November 1938 it was renamed Mueang Chai Nat.

== Administration ==
The district is divided into nine sub-districts (tambons), which are further subdivided into 81 villages (mubans). Chai Nat is a town (thesaban mueang) which covers tambon Nai Mueang and parts of Ban Kluai, Tha Chai, and Khao Tha Phra. There are a further eight tambon administrative organizations (TAO).

No.	Name	Thai	Villages	Pop.
1.	Nai Mueang	ในเมือง	-	5,861
2.	Ban Kluai	บ้านกล้วย	7	13,379
3.	Tha Chai	ท่าชัย	11	8,801
4.	Chai Nat	ชัยนาท	9	8,259
5.	Khao Tha Phra	เขาท่าพระ	7	7,552
6.	Hat Tha Sao	หาดท่าเสา	8	5,031
7.	Thammamun	ธรรมามูล	10	7,547
8.	Suea Hok	เสือโฮก	14	7,682
9.	Nang Lue	นางลือ	15	7,919
