= Sankhaburi district =

Sankhaburi สรรคบุรี
- District
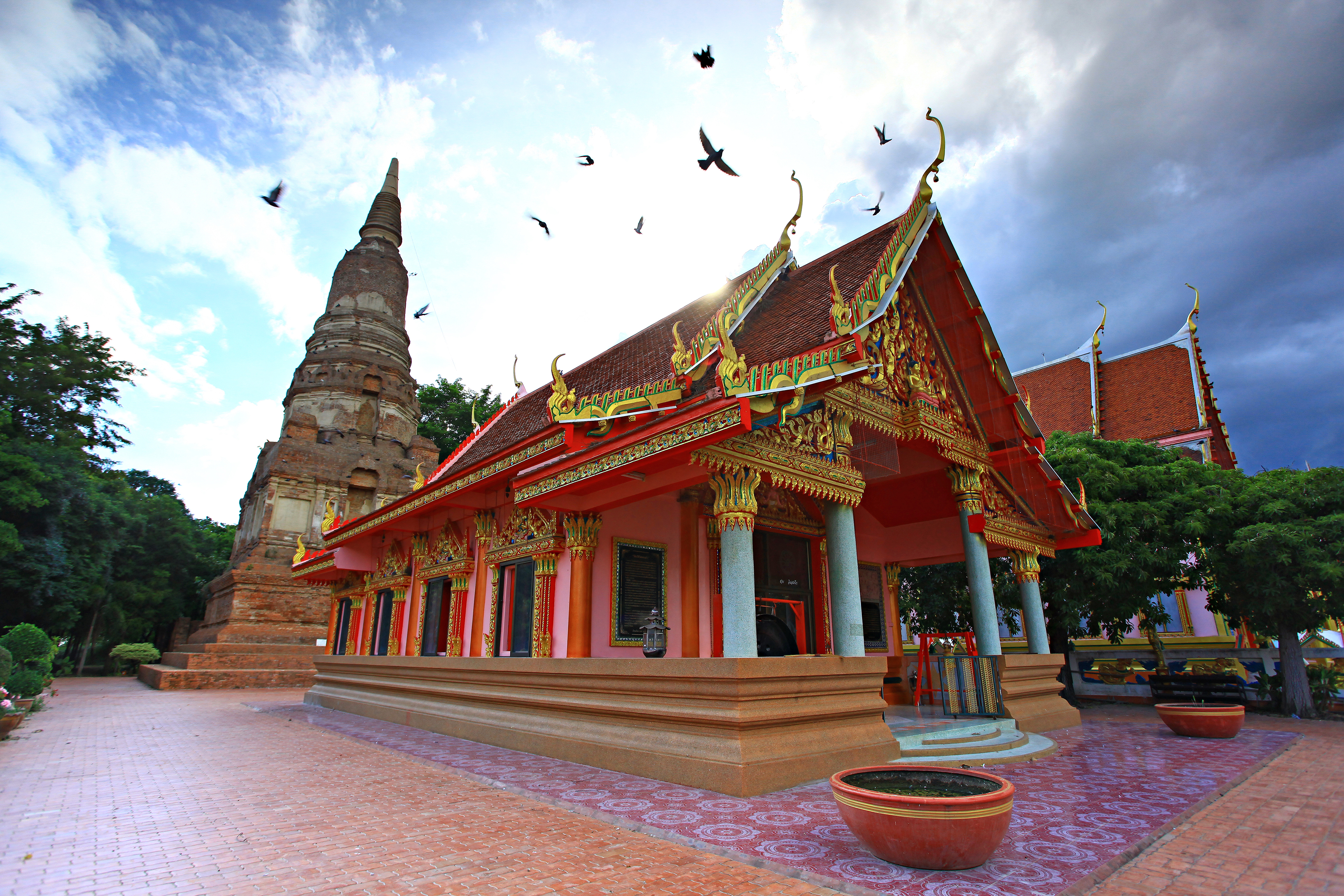
- Wat Phra Kaeo in tambon Phraek Si Racha

- District location in Chai Nat province
- Coordinates: 15°2′50″N 100°9′42″E
- Country: Thailand
- Province: Chai Nat
- Seat: Phraek Si Racha

Area
  - Total: 354.8 km^{2} (137.0 sq mi)

Population (2008)
  - Total: 67,333
  - Density: 192.8/km^{2} (499/sq mi)
- Time zone: UTC+7 (ICT)
- Postal code: 17140
- Geocode: 1805

Sankhaburi (Thai: สรรคบุรี) is a district (amphoe) in the southern part of Chai Nat province, central Thailand.

== History ==
The name of Sankhaburi or Sawankhaburi has the same meaning as the name of the nearby province, Nakhon Sawan, is "Heavenly City". It was originally known as Phraek Si Racha (the term "Phraek" is a Mon language meaning "water intersection").

The history of Sankhaburi began at about 2,500 years ago. At that time, Sankhaburi depends on Suphannaphum Kingdom (present-day Suphanburi) in this area to Nakhon Sawan as an important trade junction.

Walailak Songsiri and Srisakra Vallibhotama place the seat of the polity Chinese records of about 1200 call Chen Li Fu in the Phraek Si Racha and Dong Khon area, that is in this district. Songsiri qualifies the placement herself. Of the small towns running south from Phraek Si Racha to the Suphan and Tha Wa rivers, this is the one that does not continue from the Dvaravati period, and excavation has not settled whether its occupation begins under the Southern Song or under the Yuan. She accounts for this by proposing that the seat moved here from the smaller inland waterways. David K. Wyatt looked for Chên Li Fu elsewhere. Setting O. W. Wolters's finding that the polity held both a port and an inland capital beside the reconstruction of the ancient shoreline by Phōngsi Wanasin and Thiwa Supcanya, and beside Wolters's note that early Chinese navigators rarely called on the eastern coast of the Bay of Bangkok, he suggested a state centred on Ratchaburi, Nakhon Chai Si or Suphan Buri.

== Geography ==
Sabkhaburi is located on the Noi river banks, a branch of the Chao Phraya river.

Neighbouring districts are (from the west clockwise) Hankha, Mueang Chai Nat, and Sapphaya of Chai Nat Province; In Buri and Bang Rachan of Sing Buri province; and Doem Bang Nang Buat of Suphan Buri province.

== Administration ==
The district is divided into eight sub-districts (tambons), which are further subdivided into 92 villages (mubans). Phraek Si Racha is a township (thesaban tambon) which covers parts of tambon Phraek Si Racha. There are a further eight tambon administrative organizations (TAO).

No.	Name	Thai	Villages	Pop.
1.	Phraek Si Racha	แพรกศรีราชา	16	16,467
2.	Thiang Thae	เที่ยงแท้	10	6,283
3.	Huai Krot	ห้วยกรด	9	9,012
4.	Pho Ngam	โพงาม	13	7,692
5.	Bang Khut	บางขุด	12	7,316
6.	Dong Khon	ดงคอน	16	12,121
7.	Don Kam	ดอนกำ	8	2,926
8.	Huai Krot Phatthana	ห้วยกรดพัฒนา	8	5,516
