= Chai Nat province =

Province of Thailand

Coordinates: 15°11′06″N 100°07′29″E

Chai Nat ชัยนาท
- Province
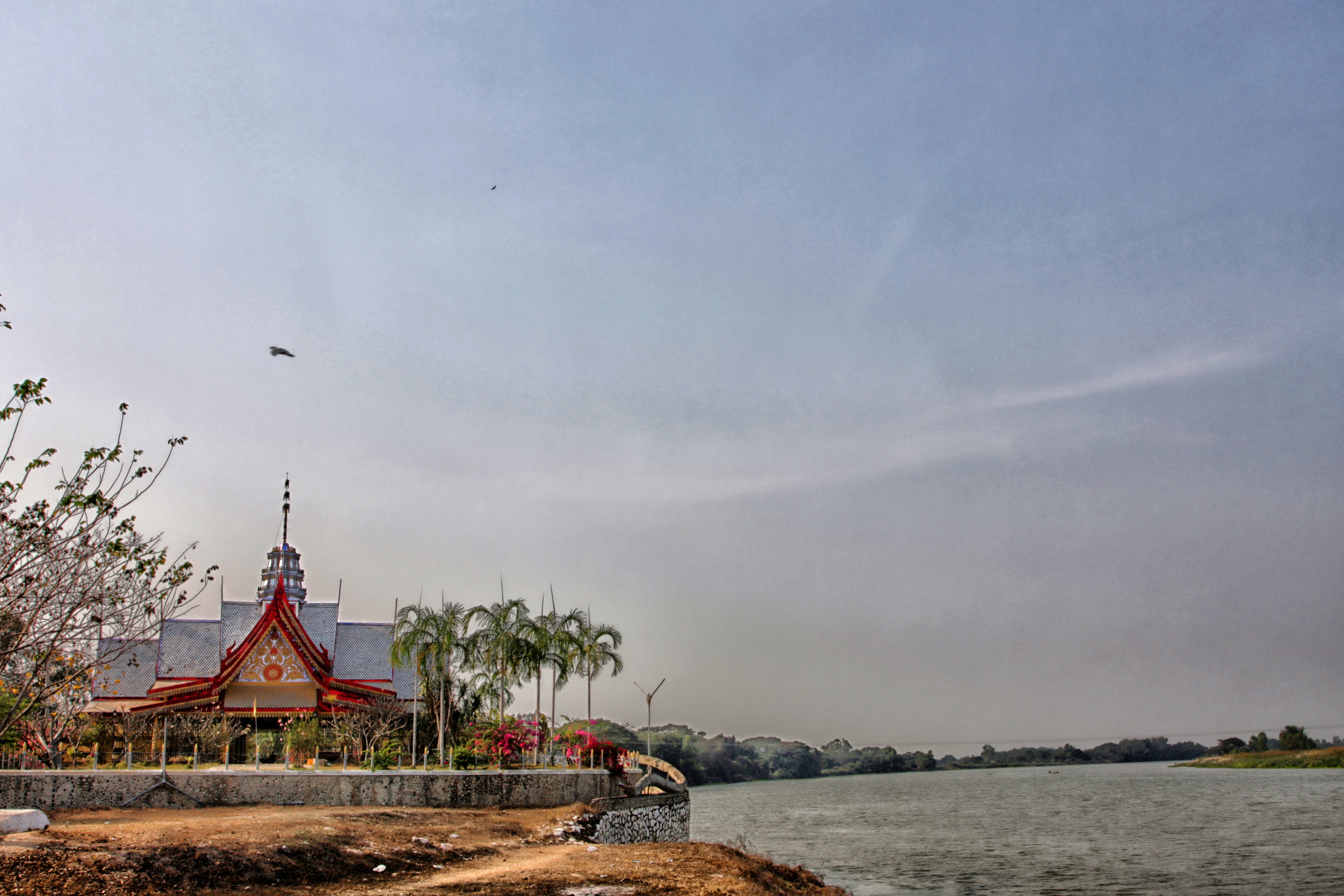
- Wat Pak Khlong Makham Thao

- Flag Seal
- Mottoes: หลวงปู่ศุขลือชา เขื่อนเจ้าพระยาลือชื่อ นามระบือสวนนก ส้มโอดกขาวแตงกวา ("Revered Luang Pu Suk. Renowned Chao Phraya Dam. Famous Bird Park. Rich in pomelos and white cucumbers.")
- Map of Thailand highlighting Chai Nat province
- Country: Thailand
- Capital: Chai Nat

Government
  - Type: Province and Provincial Administrative Organization
  - Body: Chai Nat Province and Chai Nat Provincial Administrative Organization
  - Governor: Phumivach Udomsap
  - PAO Chief Executive: Jitthana Yingthaweelapa

Area
  - Total: 2,506 km^{2} (968 sq mi)
  - Rank: 65th

Population (2024)
  - Total: ▼313,759
  - Rank: 69th
  - Density: 131/km^{2} (340/sq mi)
  - Rank: 33rd

Human Achievement Index
  - HAI (2022): 0.6124 "low" Ranked 73rd

GDP
  - Total: baht 32 billion (US$1.1 billion) (2019)
- Time zone: UTC+7 (ICT)
- Postal code: 17xxx
- Calling code: 056
- ISO 3166 code: TH-18
- Website: chainat.go.th chainatpao.go.th

Chai Nat (Thai: ชัยนาท, pronounced [tɕʰāj nâːt]) is one of the central provinces (changwat) of Thailand. Neighbouring provinces are (from north clockwise) Nakhon Sawan, Sing Buri, Suphan Buri, and Uthai Thani. The town of Chai Nat is 188 km north of Bangkok.

== Geography ==
Chai Nat is on the flat river plain of central Thailand's Chao Phraya River valley. In the south of the province the Chao Phraya Dam (formerly Chai Nat Dam) impounds the river, for flood control and to divert water into the country's largest irrigation system, which serves the rice paddies of the lower valley. The dam, part of the Greater Chao Phraya Project, was finished in 1957 and was the first dam constructed in Thailand. The total forest area is 64 km^{2} (25 sq mi) or 2.6 percent of the provincial area.

== History ==
The province holds sites much older than the town. At Ban Don Krachon in Hankha a group of metal votive tablets was found in 1982, in a Chinese jar inside a laterite crypt built from the reused stones of an earlier shrine. Walailak Songsiri, surveying the place in December 2024, found it too small to have raised a large sanctuary of its own. She and Srisakra Vallibhotama place the seat of the polity the Chinese called Chen Li Fu in the Phraek Si Racha and Dong Khon area of Sankhaburi district, in the south of the province. Inscribed silver medallions reading śrī-dvāravatī-īśvara-puṇya are recorded from this province, and from Nakhon Pathom, Ratchaburi, Suphan Buri, Lop Buri and Sing Buri. Most are chance finds of unknown provenance, many are in private collections, and forgeries have lately been noticed.

A broken stone wheel of the law and a fragment of an octagonal pillar were found in 1988 in Manorom district, in the north-east of the province. Both are inscribed in Pāli, and the find spot lies between the moated ancient towns of Muang Nakhon Noi and U-Ta Pao. The wheel is catalogued CN. 14; its inscription is in Southeast Asian Brāhmī and is dated to the seventh century in the Fine Arts Department's Inscriptions in Thailand. The pillar, CN. 15, carries the same script and the same date. Slightly less than half of the wheel survives. Eng Jin Ooi and Peter Skilling take it as the earliest surviving witness to the Pāli Dhammacakkappavattana as that text circulated in central Siam.

Dvāravatī material has been recovered around U-Ta Pao, which lies on the edge of the Hang Nam Sakorn waterway. It includes structures, earthenware sherds and numerous silver coins stamped with a conch, or with a rising sun and śrīvatsa symbols. Thirty-two of the coins are in the Bangkok National Museum. The finder kept the wheel and the objects found with it in a private museum. In 2018 his sister presented them to Princess Maha Chakri Sirindhorn, who passed them to the Fine Arts Department, and they have since been in the Chainatmuni National Museum. Stephen Murphy and Pimchanok Pongkasetkan place the upper part of the province in the Upper Chao Phraya basin, a group of Dvāravatī sites that also takes in Nakhon Sawan, Kamphaeng Phet, Phichit and Phitsanulok.

A survey by Phōngsi Wanasin and Thiwa Supcanya found the ancient settlements of the plain arranged in two rows above the 3.5-metre contour, the eastern running from Chainat through Inburi, Singburi and Phromburi to Lopburi. David K. Wyatt, who reports the survey, reads the rows as the fringes of a plain then largely under water. He uses Chainat and Phraek Si Racha as names for the same place on his map of the period. He records that a ruler of Phetburi, in a year he reads as 1204, sent troops and colonists north to it.

According to the Ayutthaya Testimonies, the provincial centre of Chai Nat was founded by the Siamese monarch Surindrarāja in the early 11th century. He renamed Ban Pran Nuea (บ้านพรานเนื้อ) as Phra Nakhon Chai Nat Buri (พระนครชัยนาทบุรี) and designated it as the new capital of the region, thereby superseding Phraek Si Racha as the principal administrative centre of the polity.

Chai Nat was first established during the Ayutthaya period and used as a base against Burmese armies. The name Chai Nat, 'place of victory', is explained by a tradition that the Burmese were defeated there each time.

After World War II and the Japanese withdrawal, economic conditions were poor and food was short. Chai Nat was affected badly, with bandits gathering in the countryside to steal cattle and commit violence.

== Symbols ==
The provincial seal shows a dhammachakka with a mountain in the background. It refers to the Dhammachak Buddha image housed in the hall of Wat Dhammamoen, built on the slope of a mountain.

The provincial tree is the bael fruit tree (Aegle marmelos), and the provincial flower is the Rainbow Shower tree (Cassia javanica). Bleeker's sheatfish (Phalacronotus bleekeri) is the provincial fish.

The slogan of the province is "Venerable Luang Pu Suk, renowned Chao Phraya Dam, famous bird park and tasty khao taengkwa pomelo."

== Administrative divisions ==
=== Provincial government ===
Map of Chai Nat with 8 districts

Chai Nat is divided into eight districts (amphoes). The districts are further subdivided into 53 sub-districts (tambons) and 503 villages (mubans).

1. Mueang Chai Nat
2. Manorom
3. Wat Sing
4. Sapphaya
5. Sankhaburi
6. Hankha
7. Nong Mamong
8. Noen Kham

=== Local government ===
As of 26 November 2019 there are: one Chai Nat Provincial Administrative Organization - PAO (ongkan borihan suan changwat) and 39 municipal (thesaban) areas in the province. Chai Nat has town (thesaban mueang) status. Further 38 subdistrict municipalities (thesaban tambon). The non-municipal areas are administered by 20 Subdistrict Administrative Organizations - SAO (ongkan borihan suan tambon).

== Places ==
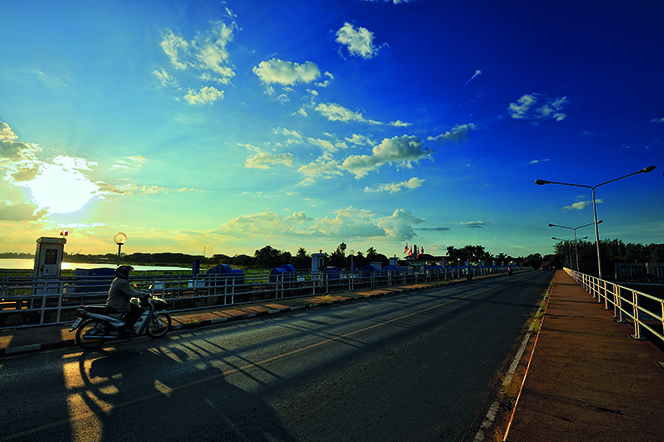
Ridge of Chao Phraya Dam

Other places in the province include:

- Chai Nat Bird Park: a bird park of 248 rai, described as the largest in Thailand and as holding the largest aviary in Asia, from which birds are released into the surrounding country. It also has a public aquarium of freshwater fish found in the Chao Phraya River.
- Wat Pak Khlong Makham Thao: a Thai temple in Wat Sing District, next to the mouth of Khlong Makham Thao (Tha Chin River). This temple used to be the residence of Luang Pu Suk. Suk was a revered monk who was known for producing many renowned amulets. He has many disciples, of whom the most respected was Prince Abhakara Kiartivongse, Prince of Chumphon.
- Sapphaya Old Police Station: an ancient police station of the district of Sapphaya, built since the King Rama V's reign older than 100 years. The station features a single level wooden building with a hip roof and received the ASA Architectural Conservation Award in 2018.
- Chai Nat Provincial Stadium, also known as Khao Plong Stadium: the home ground of Chainat Hornbill F.C.

== Notable people ==
=== Born in Chai Nat ===
- Rong Wongsawan (1932–2009): writer
- Pongsri Woranuch (1938–2025): Luk thung singer
- Pumpuang Duangjan (1961–1992): Luk thung singer, actress
- Kapol Thongplub (b. 1967): DJ, TV host
- Muangchai Kittikasem (b. 1968): world-class professional boxer
- Saranyu Winaipanit (b. 1984): singer, actor
- Supanat Chalermchaichareonkij (b. 1986): singer, actor
- Natthanicha Jaisaen (b. 1998): world-class volleyball player

== Human achievement index 2022 ==
Health	Education	Employment	Income
68	24	72	67
Housing	Family	Transport	Participation
46	63	60	19
Province Chai Nat, with an HAI 2022 value of 0.6124 is "low", occupies place 73 in the ranking.

Since 2003, United Nations Development Programme (UNDP) in Thailand has tracked progress on human development at sub-national level using the Human achievement index (HAI), a composite index covering all the eight key areas of human development. National Economic and Social Development Board (NESDB) has taken over this task since 2017.

Rank	Classification
1–13	"High"
14–29	"Somewhat high"
30–45	"Average"
46–61	"Somewhat low"
62–77	"Low"

Map with provinces and HAI 2022 rankings
