= Si Bua Thong =

Si Bua Thong สีบัวทอง
- Tambon
- Interactive map of Si Bua Thong
- Coordinates: 14.782590°N 100.248822°E
- Country: Thailand
- Province: Ang Thong
- District: Sawaeng Ha

Government
  - Type: Subdistrict Administrative Organization (SAO)
  - Mayor: Kitt Boonprasop
  - Deputy Mayor: Kong Suandokmai
  - Deputy Mayor: Thawin Jaemkrajang

Area
  - Total: 42.02 km^{2} (16.22 sq mi)

Population (December 2022)
  - Total: 6,686
  - Density: 159.1/km^{2} (412.1/sq mi)
- Time zone: UTC+7 (ICT)
- Postal code: 14150
- TIS 1099: 150505
- Website: https://www.sribuathong.go.th

Si Bua Thong (Thai: สีบัวทอง, pronounced [sǐː būa̯ tʰɔ̄ːŋ]) is a tambon (subdistrict) in Sawaeng Ha district, Ang Thong province, central Thailand.

== History ==
The name Si Bua Thong (lit. 'golden lotus') comes from a khlong (canal) flows through the area and has become an important water resource.

Si Bua Thong is considered a true historic place. The area and its neighbour are home to many antiquities that indicate human settlement since the Dvaravati period. The oldest archaeological evidences are around 3,000 years old, from the Neolithic period.

In the late Ayutthaya period, when the Burmese army invaded and passed through here, the locals rose up to fight. Some were defeated and scattered. Four people from Si Bua Thong were Nai Taen, Nai In, Nai Mueang and Nai Chote migrated to a nearby Bang Rachan, and became one of the leaders of the famous Bang Rachan. Their names were recorded in the royal chronicle of Prince Damrong Rajanubhab.

After Ayutthaya was sacked by the Burmese in 1767, many places were destroyed. A huntsman gathered people and restored the community of Si Bua Thong. Today, a monument has been built to him and he is respectfully called Pu Pin (ปู่ปิ่น, lit. 'grandpa Pin').

== Geography ==
The area is a lowland with a natural waterway, Khlong Si Bua Thong, flowing from the north to the south, making it suitable for agriculture.

It borders Pho Thale and Nong Krathum of Khai Bang Rachan district, Singburi province to the north, Sawaeng Ha in its district to the east, Ban Phran and Wang Namyen in tis district to the south, Khao Din of Doem Bang Nang Buat district, Wang Luek of Sam Chuk district, Don Pru of Si Prachan district to the west. All in the west part belongs to Suphan Buri province.

It has a total area of approximately 42.02 km^{2} and is 7 km (4.3 mi) away from downtown Sawaeng Ha.

== Administration ==
=== Central administration ===
Si Bua Thong is governed by the Subdistrict Administrative Organization (SAO) Si Bua Thong

=== Local administration ===
There are 11 administrative mubans (villages)

No.	Name	Thai
1.	Ban Don Jaeng	บ้านดอนแจง
2.	Ban Si Bua Thong	บ้านสีบัวทอง
3.	Ban Yang Khlang	บ้านยางกลาง
4.	Ban Khlong Cha-om	บ้านคลองชะอม
5.	Ban Nong Prue	บ้านหนองปรือ
6.	Ban Kaew Krachang, Don Krabueang	บ้านแก้วกระจ่าง, ดอนกระเบื้อง
7.	Ban Yang U	บ้านยางอู่
8.	Ban Yang Tha Fueak	บ้านยางท่าเฝือก
9.	Ban Nong Suea	บ้านหนองเสือ
10.	Ban Khlong Khut	บ้านคลองขุด
11.	Ban Rai Oi Khet Song	บ้านไร่อ้อยเขต 2
