= Sawaeng Ha district =

Sawaeng Ha แสวงหา
- District
- District location in Ang Thong province
- Coordinates: 14°45′5″N 100°19′29″E
- Country: Thailand
- Province: Ang Thong
- District established: 1948
- Seat: Sawaeng Ha

Area
  - Total: 181.3 km^{2} (70.0 sq mi)

Population (2008)
  - Total: 34,734
  - Density: 191.6/km^{2} (496.2/sq mi)
- Time zone: UTC+07:00 (ICT)
- Postal code: 14150
- Geocode: 1505

Sawaeng Ha (Thai: แสวงหา, pronounced [sā.wɛ̌ːŋ hǎː]) is the northernmost district (amphoe) of Ang Thong province, central Thailand.

Sawaeng Ha in Thai language means 'seek' or 'find'.

== History ==
The name of Tambon Sawaeng Ha was first found in the Ayutthaya Kingdom records.

In 1945 Tambon Si Bua Thong area was still a rural area covered by deep forest between the two provinces Suphan Buri and Sing Buri. This made it a popular hiding place for criminals. The government thus set up a commando division in Tambon Sawaeng Ha to sweep them up.

Effective January 1, 1948 the government upgraded the area to a minor district (king amphoe) by splitting five sub-districts from Pho Thong District. In 1956 it was upgraded to a full district.

== Geography ==
Neighbouring districts are (from the north clockwise) Khai Bang Rachan and Tha Chang of Sing Buri province, Pho Thong of Ang Thong province, and Si Prachan, Sam Chuk and Doem Bang Nang Buat of Suphan Buri province.

== Administration ==
The district is divided into seven sub-districts (tambons), which are further subdivided into 61 villages (mubans). Sawaeng Ha is also a sub-district municipality (thesaban tambon) which covers parts of the tambon Sawaeng Ha. There are a further seven tambon administrative organizations (TAO).

No.	Name	Thai	Pop.
1.	Sawaeng Ha	แสวงหา	8,988
2.	Si Phran	ศรีพราน	2,494
3.	Ban Phran	บ้านพราน	4,833
4.	Wang Nam Yen	วังน้ำเย็น	6,520
5.	Si Bua Thong	สีบัวทอง	6,908
6.	Huai Phai	ห้วยไผ่	2,707
7.	Chamlong	จำลอง	2,284
