= Thanis Sriklindee =

- ธนิสร์ ศรีกลิ่นดี
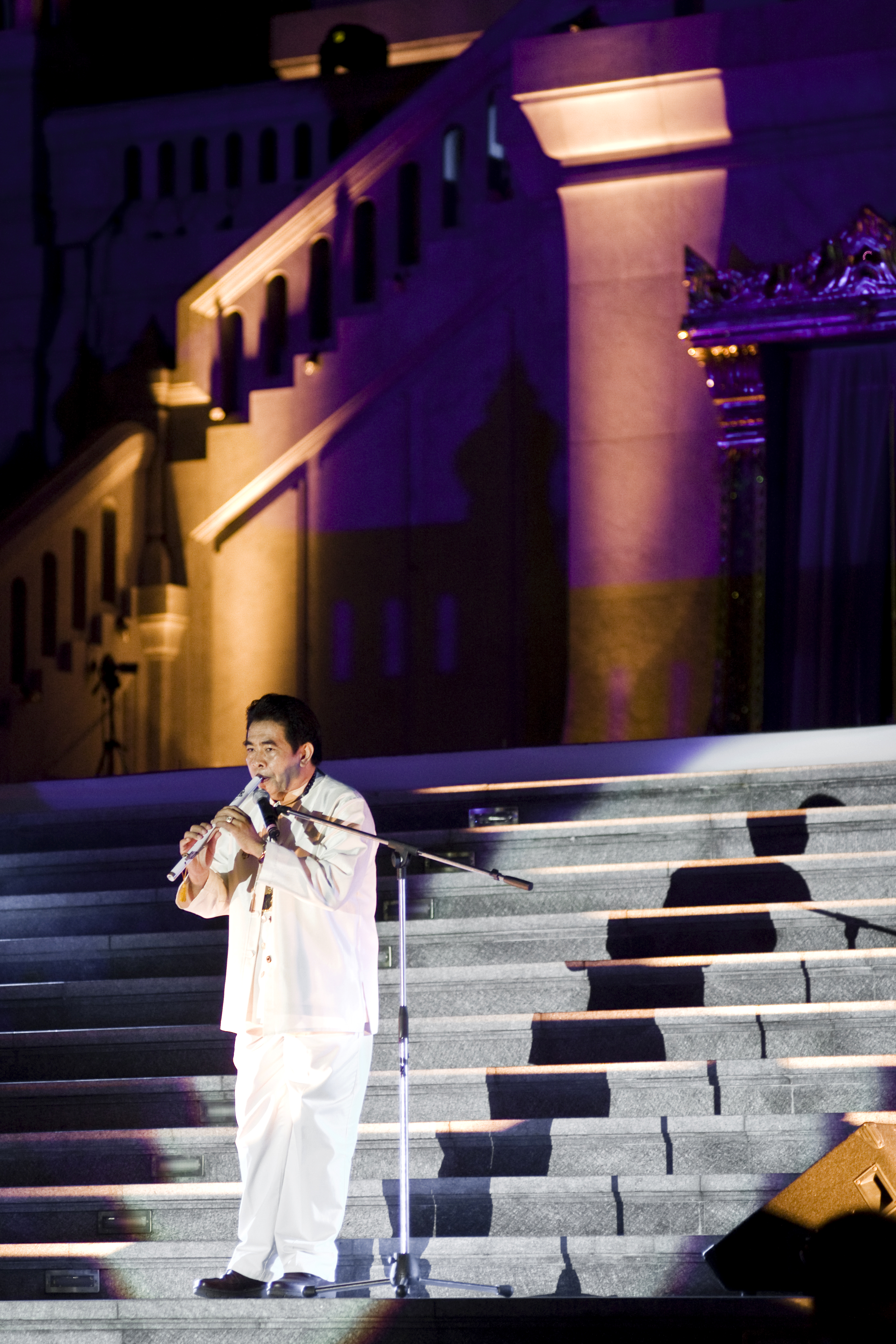
- Thanis Sriklindee on December 28, 2009 at Wat Traimit, Bangkok
- Born: January 23, 1951 (age 75); Amphoe Phrom Buri, Singburi Province, central Thailand
- Other names: Lek; Ajaan Thanis; Ajaan; Chomyuth khlui (จอมยุทธ์ขลุ่ย) "Khlui Martial Artist"
- Occupations: Musician; record producer; radio presenter; composer
- Years active: 1970s–present
- Spouse: Chulalaksa Sriklindee (died)
- Children: 2, including Sasiwanna Sriklindee (daughter) and Somwutti Sriklindee (son)
- Awards: Season Awards (1989); (Best Group); Season Awards (1993); (Best Instrumental); National Artist (2016); (Performing Art for International Music); Thailand International Jazz 2016; (Lifetime Achievement Award)
- Musical career
- Genres: Folk; world; phleng phuea chiwit; jazz; luk thung; R&B; Pop; Acoustic
- Instruments: Khlui; keyboard; saxophone; clarinet; flute; piano; accordion; guitar
- Website: Official website

Thanis Sriklindee (Thai: ธนิสร์ ศรีกลิ่นดี, RTGS: Thanit Siklindi; born 23 January 1951) or simply known as Ajaan Thanis (อาจารย์ธนิสร์, อ.ธนิสร์) is a Thai musician and former member of Carabao, a famous and popular Thai rock and Phleng phuea chiwit (เพลงเพื่อชีวิต; lit: songs for life) band.

== Biography and career ==
Sriklindee was born in Tambon Hua Pa, Amphoe Phrom Buri, Singburi Province, on January 23, 1951 in a musician family. He grew up in the rural ambiance and was influenced by the folk music of central Thailand such as Luk thung (ลูกทุ่ง; Thai folk music), Lam Tad (ลำตัด), Choi (ฉ่อย) etc. He graduated from Pathumwan College of Education (present-day Pathumwan Institute of Technology) and received a bachelor's degree in Musicology from Srinakharinwirot University. He can play many instruments such as keyboard, piano, organ, guitar, but he specialises in wind instruments including saxophone, clarinet and flute, particularly the Khlui (ขลุ่ย; Thai flute). His playing earned him the nickname "จอมยุทธ์ขลุ่ย" (Khlui Martial Artist).

Since he was a music instructor in various universities were Srinakharinwirot University, Chandrakasem Teachers College (present-day Chandrakasem Rajabhat University) and Faculty of Fine and Applied Arts, Chulalongkorn University for about 10 years, he is often called "Ajaan" (อาจารย์) because the word "Ajann" in Thai means professor or instructor.

He had been a backup musician for many bands. Later in 1983, Carabao recorded at Amigo Studio which he was backup along with Thierry Mekwattana and Amnaat Luukjan. The three of them had been persuaded by Yuenyong Opakul, a leader to become a member of the band.

Sriklindee was very involved making for Carabao with Made in Thailand in the fifth album Made in Thailand in late 1984, until well-known throughout the country from his khlui played throughout the track.

His role in Carabao, besides music, was to create a fun, such as talk retaliate against Opakul for jokes or colourful, because he was the only member that was different from anyone else. Because he does not had long hair, not bearded and also had a fat shape.

In 1989, after the release of their ninth album, Thap Lang (ทับหลัง; The Lintel) was the year that each member out of the band, which the end of the most heyday. Sriklindee was the first. In the same year, he co with Mekwattana and Luukjan, releasing their first album titled Khor Diew Duay Kon Na (ขอเดี่ยวด้วยคนนะ; Let me Solo) in a style similar to Carabao.

In 1992, he released his first solo album, Lom Pai (ลมไผ่; Bamboo Wind), featuring the well-known song, Tan Tawan (ทานตะวัน; Sunflower), written from the poem of Naowarat Pongpaiboon, when he joined Carabao's tour concert in the United States in 1985.

Sriklindee then became a backup and record producer for many famous Luk thung singers such as Sirintra Niyakorn, Janjuang Duangjan (Pumpuang Duangjan's sister). He is also a DJ for radio stations in the MCOT network. For Carabao although he is a former member. However, he returned to work on important occasions, for example, on the band 30th anniversary concert in 2011 etc.

In 2016, he was appointed National Artist of Performing art (International Music) from Ministry of Culture. And in the same year, he acquired Lifetime Achievement Award from Thailand International Jazz 2016 presented by College of Music, Mahidol University.

In the film Young Bao The Movie released in 2013 with a story about Carabao in the beginning. His character was represented by Supakorn "Tok" Kitsuwon.
