= Noi River =

Coordinates: 14°22′N 100°25′E

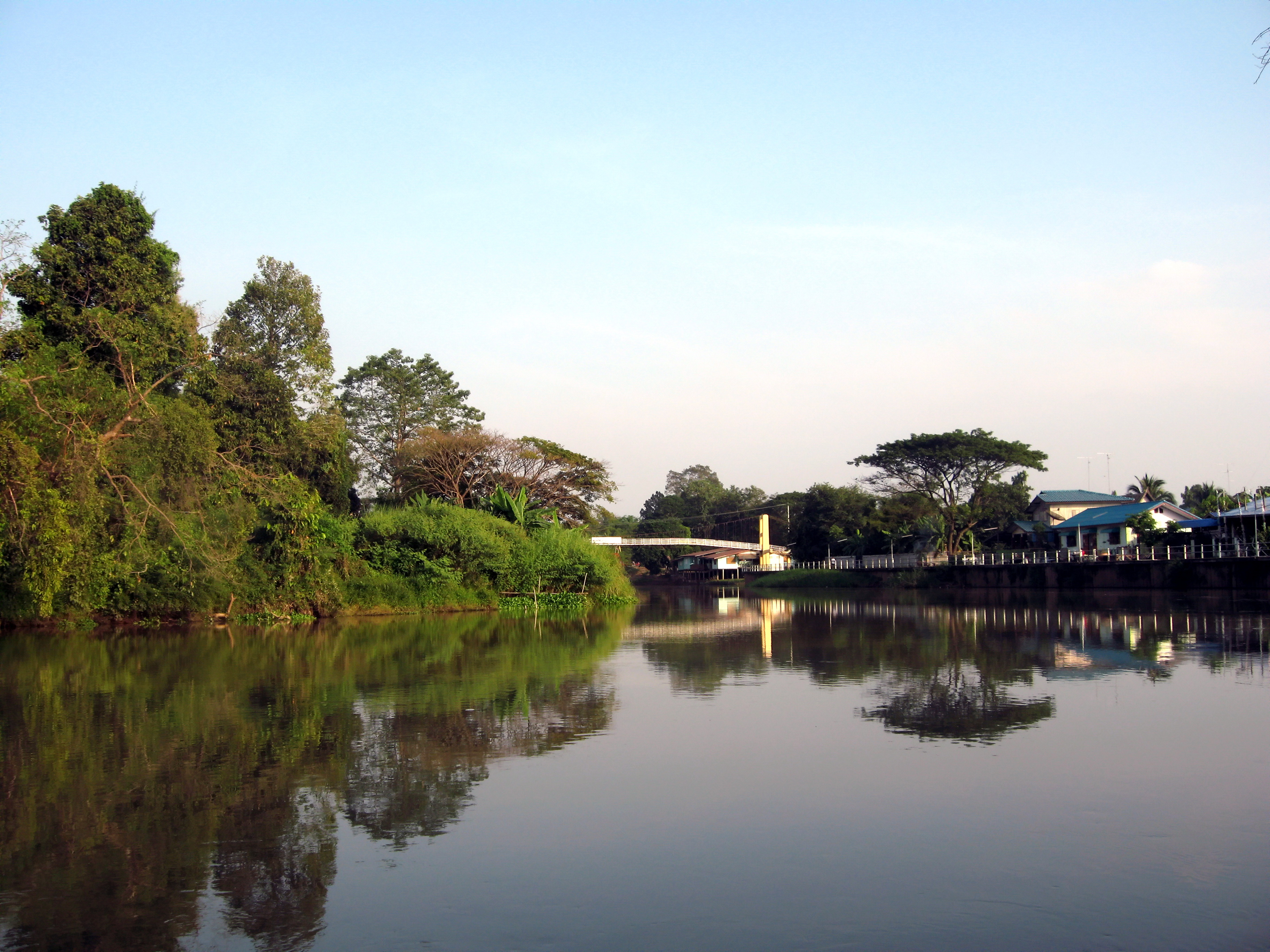

Location
- Country: Thailand

Physical characteristics
- Source
  - location: Chao Phraya Dam at Chai Nat
- Mouth
  - location: Chao Phraya River at Bang Sai

The Noi River (Thai: แม่น้ำน้อย, RTGS: Maenam Noi, Thai pronunciation: [mɛ̂ːnáːm nɔ́ːj]) is a river in Thailand.

== Geography ==
The Noi River is a distributary of the Chao Phraya River. It originates at the Chao Phraya Dam at Chai Nat and rejoins the Chao Phraya at Bang Sai District, Ayutthaya.

== History ==
Historically, the Noi River Basin is the oldest settlement site of the entire Chao Phraya River Basin, as evidence Mae Nam Noi Kiln Site in Bang Rachan District, Singburi, older than the Ayutthaya period.

The Noi River was also the site of the original Mueang Wiset Chai Chan, the location of a historic Burmese encampment en route to the Battle at Bang Rachan.
