= Bang Rachan subdistrict =

Bang Rachan บางระจัน
- Tambon
- Location within Thailand
- Country: Thailand
- Province: Sing Buri
- Amphoe: Khai Bang Rachan

Population (2014)
  - Total: 7,382
- Time zone: UTC+7 (TST)
- Postal code: 16150
- TIS 1099: 170302

Bang Rachan (Thai: บางระจัน, pronounced [bāːŋ rā.t͡ɕān]) is a tambon (subdistrict) of Khai Bang Rachan District, in Sing Buri Province, Thailand. In 2014, it had a total population of 7,382 people. The subdistrict is named after the historical village Bang Rachan.

== Administration ==
=== Central administration ===
The tambon is subdivided into 11 administrative villages (muban).

No.	Name	Thai
1.	Ban Si Liam	บ้านสี่เหลี่ยม
2.	Ban Khok Phrao	บ้านโคกพร้าว
3.	Ban Khok Phrao	บ้านโคกพร้าว
4.	Ban Khok Phrao	บ้านโคกพร้าว
5.	Ban Khok Phrao	บ้านโคกพร้าว
6.	Ban Wang Ka	บ้านวังกา
7.	Ban Wang Ka	บ้านวังกา
8.	Ban Wang Ka	บ้านวังกา
9.	Ban Bang Rachan	บ้านบางระจัน
10.	Ban Thap Chek Ha	บ้านทับเจ๊กฮะ
11.	Ban Thanon Tok	บ้านถนนตก

=== Local administration ===
The whole area of the subdistrict is covered by the subdistrict administrative organization (SAO) Khai Bang Rachan (องค์การบริหารส่วนตำบลค่ายบางระจัน)
