= Doem Bang Nang Buat district =

Doem Bang Nang Buat เดิมบางนางบวช
- District
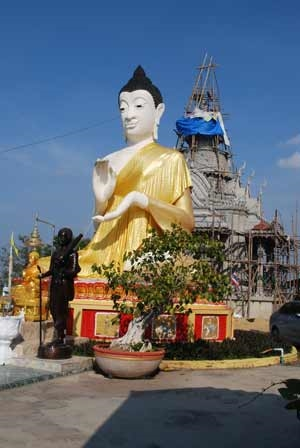
- Wat Khao Nang Buat and statue of Phra Ajarn Thammachote

- District location in Suphan Buri province
- Coordinates: 14°51′13″N 100°5′52″E
- Country: Thailand
- Province: Suphan Buri
- Seat: Khao Phra

Area
  - Total: 552.3 km^{2} (213.2 sq mi)

Population (2013)
  - Total: 73,741
  - Density: 135.1/km^{2} (350/sq mi)
- Time zone: UTC+7 (ICT)
- Postal code: 72120
- Geocode: 7202

Doem Bang Nang Buat (Thai: เดิมบางนางบวช, pronounced [dɤ̄ːm bāːŋ nāːŋ bùa̯t̚]) is a district (amphoe) in the northern part of Suphan Buri province, central Thailand.

== History ==
In the past, Nang Buat District covered a large area. Prince Damrong Rajanubhab and the governor of Suphan Buri agreed to separate the northernmost part and then created a new district named Doem Bang on 16 May 1911. Two tambons of Hankha district, Chai Nat province and two tambons of Bang Rachan district, Sing Buri province were added. In 1939 the government changed the district name of Nang Buat District to Sam Chuk, they decided to put the word Nang Buat after Doem Bang, so since that year the district is named Doem Bang Nang Buat.

Its name literally means 'formerly place of ordained lady', according to folklore from the Sukhothai period.

== Geography ==
Neighbouring districts are (from the north clockwise): Noen Kham, Hankha and Sankhaburi of Chai Nat province; Bang Rachan and Khai Bang Rachan of Sing Buri province; Sawaeng Ha of Ang Thong province; and Sam Chuk, Nong Ya Sai and Dan Chang of Suphan Buri Province.

The main water resource of Doem Bang Nang Buat is the Tha Chin River or Suphan River.

== Administration ==
=== Central administration ===
The district is divided into 14 subdistricts (tambons), which are further subdivided into 121 administrative villages (mubans).

No.	Name	Thai	Villages	Pop.
1.	Khao Phra	เขาพระ	11	8,610
2.	Doem Bang	เดิมบาง	11	7,630
3.	Nang Buat	นางบวช	10	7,852
4.	Khao Din	เขาดิน	12	6,071
5.	Pak Nam	ปากน้ำ	7	4,724
6.	Thung Khli	ทุ่งคลี	8	5,563
7.	Khok Chang	โคกช้าง	10	4,641
8.	Hua Khao	หัวเขา	12	6,922
9.	Hua Na	หัวนา	7	4,359
10.	Bo Kru	บ่อกรุ	7	4,247
11.	Wang Si Rat	วังศรีราช	4	594
12.	Pa Sakae	ป่าสะแก	6	2,704
13.	Yang Non	ยางนอน	7	4,952
14.	Nong Krathum	หนองกระทุ่ม	9	4,872

=== Local administration ===
There are eight sub-district municipalities (thesaban tambons) in the district:

- Pak Nam (Thai: เทศบาลตำบลปากน้ำ) consisting of sub-district Pak Nam.
- Thung Khli (Thai: เทศบาลตำบลทุ่งคลี) consisting of sub-district Thung Khli.
- Nong Krathum (Thai: เทศบาลตำบลหนองกระทุ่ม) consisting of sub-district Nong Krathum.
- Khao Phra (Thai: เทศบาลตำบลเขาพระ) consisting of parts of sub-districts Khao Phra, Doem Bang.
- Nang Buat (Thai: เทศบาลตำบลนางบวช) consisting of parts of sub-district Nang Buat.
- Bo Kru (Thai: เทศบาลตำบลบ่อกรุ) consisting of parts of sub-district Bo Kru.
- Khao Din (Thai: เทศบาลตำบลเขาดิน) consisting of sub-district Khao Din.
- Doem Bang (Thai: เทศบาลตำบลเดิมบาง) consisting of parts of sub-district Doem Bang.

There are eight sub-district administrative organizations (SAO) in the district:

- Khao Phra (Thai: องค์การบริหารส่วนตำบลเขาพระ) consisting of parts of sub-district Khao Phra.
- Nang Buat (Thai: องค์การบริหารส่วนตำบลนางบวช) consisting of parts of sub-district Nang Buat.
- Khok Chang (Thai: องค์การบริหารส่วนตำบลโคกช้าง) consisting of sub-district Khok Chang.
- Hua Khao (Thai: องค์การบริหารส่วนตำบลหัวเขา) consisting of sub-district Hua Khao.
- Hua Na (Thai: องค์การบริหารส่วนตำบลหัวนา) consisting of sub-district Hua Na.
- Bo Kru (Thai: องค์การบริหารส่วนตำบลบ่อกรุ) consisting of parts of sub-district Bo Kru.
- Pa Sakae (Thai: องค์การบริหารส่วนตำบลป่าสะแก) consisting of sub-district Wang Si Rat, Pa Sakae.
- Yang Non (Thai: องค์การบริหารส่วนตำบลยางนอน) consisting of sub-district Yang Non.

== Places ==
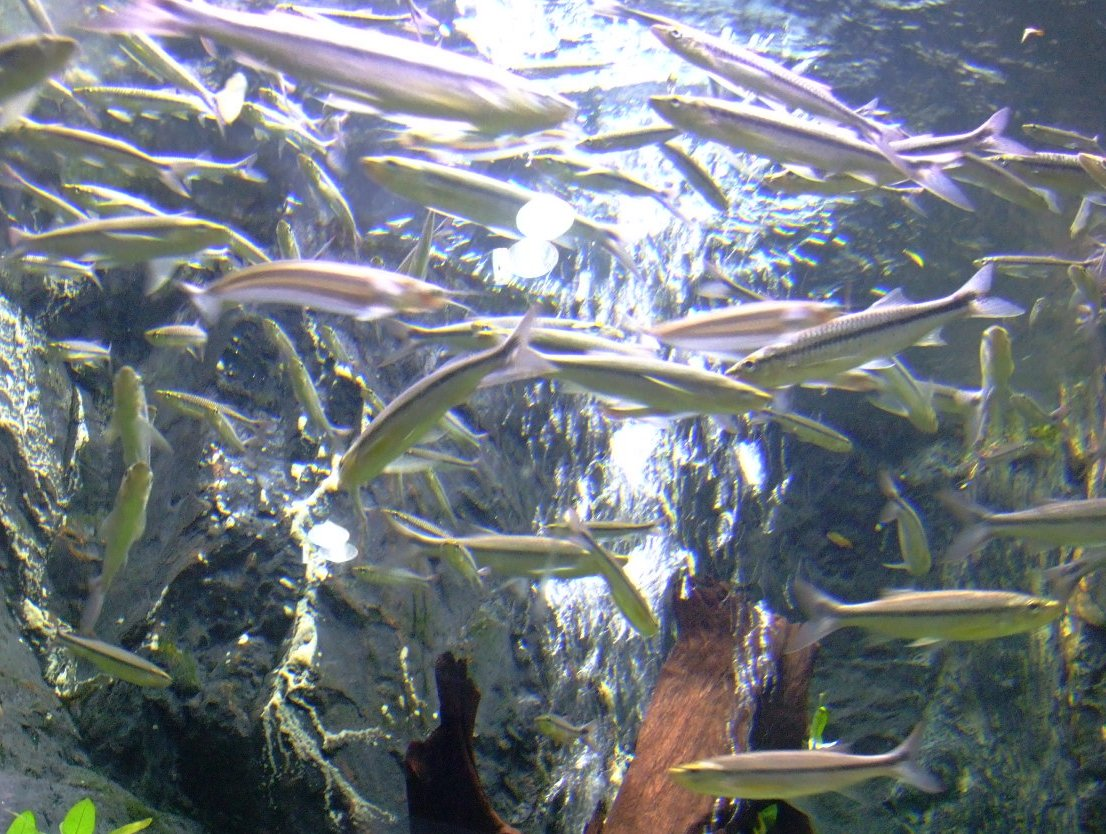
School of shark minnow (Luciosoma bleekeri), Bueng Chawak Chaloem Phrakiet

- Wat Nang Buat (Thai: วัดนางบวช) an ancient local temples that are more than 100 years old but have an unclear history.
- Wat Khao Nang Buat (Thai: วัดเขานางบวช) is another ancient temple of the district, believed to be the temple of Phra Ajarn Thammachote, a monk in the Ayutthaya period that was respected by the villagers of Bang Rachan. Its name is the origin of the district name.
- Bueng Chawak Chaloem Phrakiet, just called Bueng Chawak (Thai: บึงฉวากเฉลิมพระเกียรติ, บึงฉวาก) is a natural freshwater lake that covers 2,700 rai (430 ha; 1,100 acres) from here to the area of Hankha District, Chai Nat Province. It is one of the province's most popular tourist attractions. The lake was declared a wildlife sanctuary area in 1983 and the government registered Bueng Chawak as an important wetland under the Ramsar Convention. Currently, there is a zoo, an aquarium with crocodiles pond, the garden of indigenous vegetables, as well as homestays in the atmosphere that is good for supporting visitors.
