= Amnaat Luukjan =

Thai musician

- Born: Amnaat Luukjan; March 20, 1949; Phra Khanong (now Prawet District), Bangkok, Thailand
- Died: July 14, 2017 (aged 68); Klang Hospital, Bangkok
- Other names: Pao; Pao Carabao
- Occupations: Musician; music teacher; navy officer
- Years active: late 1960s–2009
- Spouse: Pungpit Luukjan
- Musical career
- Genres: Phleng phuea chiwit; Luk thung; Luk krung; Pop; Fusion jazz; Pop jazz; Folk; R&B
- Instruments: Drum; percussion
- Formerly of: Carabao

Amnaat Luukjan (Thai: อำนาจ ลูกจันทร์; March 20, 1949 – July 14, 2017 in Bangkok) or better known as Pao Carabao (เป้า คาราบาว), nickname Pao (เป้า), was a Thai musician. He was known as drummer of Carabao, a famous Thai rock and Phleng phuea chiwit (Thai protest song) band.

== Biography & career ==
Luukjan was born in Bangkok's Phra Khanong neighbourhood (currently Prawet District). He graduated from The Royal Thai Navy School of Music and entered navy service as a Petty Officer 1st Class (PO1) at Royal Thai Navy Music Division. He started playing music from the trumpet, then change to drum.

He was a backup musician with many bands and many famous singers in various genres such as Luk krung, Luk thung, or pop, were Pumpuang Duangjan, Phloen Phromdaen, Yodrak Salakjai, The Hot Pepper Singers, Don Sornrabieb, Pink Panther etc. He began to play music from the fusion jazz and pop jazz along nightclub and pub, he was considered the first musician to pioneer this genres of music in Thailand.

In 1983, he was persuaded to become a member of Carabao from Yuenyong Opakul (Aed Carabao), a band leader along with two fellow musicians, Thierry Mekwattana and Thanis Sriklindee in the fourth album, Thor. Thahaan Ot Thon (ท.ทหารอดทน; lit: "The Long-suffering Soldier"). He was the only member who never sang or even support sang, he only plays as a drummer.

In 1989, the year that each member out of the band. He collaborated with Mekwattana and Sriklindee to release their first album as the title, Khor Diew Duay Kon Na (ขอเดี่ยวด้วยคนนะ; "Let me Solo") in a style similar to Carabao.

== Life after Carabao & death ==
Life after Carabao, he taught music to children at his home and also produced Pearl brand percussion instruments for sale.

Although he was a former member. However, he continued to perform in major concerts with the band such as 10th Anniversary Concert in 1991 at MBK Hall, MBK Center, 20th Anniversary Concert in 2003 at Plenary Hall, Queen Sirikit National Convention Center, 25th Anniversary Concert in 2007 at Impact, Muang Thong Thani, especially in the 25th anniversary concert, he sang without rehearsing for the first time on stage titled Ran Lao Rim Tang (ร้านเหล้าริมทาง; "Vendor Bar").

In early 2008, he underwent neck and heart surgery. Which made him paralyzed from a herniated disk. He lived alone in his home in Ladprao neighbourhood. On October 22, 2009, he was sentenced to bankruptcy. He died near midnight on July 14, 2017, from a hemorrhagic stroke, aged 68 years. The cremation ceremony took place on July 22 the same year at Wat Ladprao.

The film Young Bao The Movie released in 2013 contained a story about Carabao at the beginning of their career. His character was represented by Somchai "Tao" Kemglad.
