= Thierry Mekwattana =

Thierry Suthiyong Mekwattana
- เทียรี่ สุทธิยงค์ เมฆวัฒนา
- Born: Thierry Suthiyong Mekwattana; April 23, 1958 (age 67); Laos
- Occupations: Singer-songwriter; musician; composer; record producer
- Years active: late 1970s–present
- Spouse: Uthumphon "Jum" Silapan (m. 1985; div. 2002)
- Children: 2, including Mekhala "Jane" Mekwattana (daughter) and Mek "Jessie" Mekwattana (son)
- Musical career
- Genres: Folk; rock; Phleng phuea chiwit; Luk Thung; Pop
- Instruments: Vocals; guitar
- Label: Warner Music Thailand

Suthiyong Mekwattana or commonly known as Thierry Mekwattana (Thai: สุทธิยงค์ เมฆวัฒนา, เทียรี่ เมฆวัฒนา; born: April 23, 1958) is a Thai singer and musician of Swiss and Chinese descent, he is best known as a member of Carabao, a famous and popular Thai rock and Phleng phuea chiwit (Thai protest song) band.

== Biography and career ==
Thierry was born in Vientiane, Laos on April 23, 1958, to a Sino-Thai father, Anek Mekwattana (เอนก เมฆวัฒนา), who worked for the United States's CIA (with the delivery of military equipment to the US Army), and a Swiss mother, Simone. Later, when a coup in Laos in 1960 occurred, Anek led his family to settle in Thailand permanently. In addition, he is also a cousin to Sondhi Limthongkul, a Thai journalist who is the owner and founder of the Manager Daily newspaper and also a political activist (Anek was a younger brother of Sondhi's mother).

He started playing guitar at the age of 11, and the first song he learned was Flying Machine by Cliff Richard. His father didn't approve, but his mother was supportive and encouraging. His favorite artists included Bob Dylan, Don McLean, The Beatles, and Queen.

He entered the entertainment industry in the late 1970s to early 1980s as a model and actor. He appeared in about two or three films as a lead actor. He released folk albums with Kittikhun "Kung" Chiansong ("กุ้ง" กิตติคุณ เชียรสงค์) and Paijit "Jung" Ugsornnarong ("จุ๋ง" ไพจิตร อักษรณรงค์). He later went on to study business administration at American Business Institute, New York, USA.

In 1983, he had his first chance to play music with Carabao as a guest musician. He was persuaded to join Carabao along with two fellow musicians, Thanit Siiklindii and Amnaat Luukjan. They became members of the band ever since.

His famous singles with Carabao are Naang Ngaam Tuu Kracok (นางงามตู้กระจก) in the fifth album Made in Thailand in December 1984 and Mae Sai (แม่สาย) in the ninth album Thap Lang in November 1988, both of them have content about the issue of prostitution in Thailand.

In 1990, he released his solo album Jor Wela Ha Pujjuban (เจาะเวลาหาปัจจุบัน). The most popular single from the album was Papaya PokPok (ปาปาย่าป๊อกป๊อก), which is about the popular Thai dish Som Tam (ส้มตำ), also known as green papaya salad.

In the film Young Bao The Movie released in 2013 with a story about Carabao in the beginning. His character was represented by Chulachak "Hugo" Chakrabongse and his own childhood, portrayed by his son Mek "Jessie" Mekwattana.

== Personal life ==
Thierry married an actress Uthumphon "Jum" Silapan ("จุ๋ม" อุทุมพร ศิลาพันธุ์) the couple had two children, Mekhala "Jane" Mekwattana ("เจน" เมขลา เมฆวัฒนา) and Mek "Jessie" Mekwattana ("เจสซี่" เมฆ เมฆวัฒนา), but in early 2002 they divorced.

In February 2010, he was reportedly hospitalized from attempting suicide by gun. But the truth was that he had severe gastritis.
