= In Buri district =

In Buri อินทร์บุรี
- District
- District location in Singburi province
- Coordinates: 15°0′28″N 100°19′37″E
- Country: Thailand
- Province: Sing Buri
- Seat: In Buri

Area
  - Total: 314.3 km^{2} (121.4 sq mi)

Population (2007)
  - Total: 57,771
  - Density: 183.8/km^{2} (476/sq mi)
- Time zone: UTC+7 (ICT)
- Postal code: 16110
- Geocode: 1706

In Buri (Thai: อินทร์บุรี, pronounced [ʔīn bū.rīː]) is the northernmost district (amphoe) of Sing Buri province in central Thailand.

== History ==
In Buri is an ancient city, one of the major mueang or city states. It is one of the towns of the eastern of two rows of ancient settlements that Phōngsi Wanasin and Thiwa Supcanya found on ground above the 3.5-metre contour of the Chao Phraya plain, running from Chainat through In Buri and Singburi to Phromburi and Lopburi. It was built in the reign of King Ramesuan in 1369. In the Ayutthaya era, the governor of In Buri always was a royal family member because In Buri was a northern frontier city of Ayutthaya. The Thesaphiban administrative reforms of King Rama V downgraded In Buri to a subordinate of Sing Buri in 1895. It was converted into a district of Sing Buri Province later.

== Geography ==
Neighboring districts are (from the north clockwise) Takhli of Nakhon Sawan province, Ban Mi of Lopburi province, Mueang Sing Buri and Bang Rachan of Sing Buri Province, and Sapphaya and Sankhaburi of Chai Nat province.

== Administration ==
The district is divided into 10 sub-districts (tambons), which are further subdivided into 101 villages (mubans). In Buri itself is a sub-district municipality which covers parts of tambon In Buri. There are another 10 tambon administrative organizations (TAO).

No.	Name	Thai	Pop.
1.	In Buri	อินทร์บุรี	11,150
2.	Prasuk	ประศุก	6,221
3.	Thap Ya	ทับยา	6,161
4.	Ngio Rai	งิ้วราย	5,604
5.	Chi Nam Rai	ชีน้ำร้าย	4,386
6.	Tha Ngam	ท่างาม	5,340
7.	Nam Tan	น้ำตาล	3,584
8.	Thong En	ทองเอน	7,977
9.	Huai Chan	ห้วยชัน	4,909
10.	Pho Chai	โพธิ์ชัย	2,439
