= Bueng Chawak =

Lake in central Thailand

Coordinates: 14.9177015°N 100.0594309°E

Bueng Chawak (Thai: บึงฉวาก, pronounced [bɯ̄ŋ t͡ɕʰā.wàːk]) or full name Bueng Chawak Chaloem Phra Kiat (บึงฉวากเฉลิมพระเกียรติ, [bɯ̄ŋ t͡ɕʰā.wàːk t͡ɕʰā.lɤ̌ːm pʰráʔ kìa̯t]) is a natural freshwater lake in central Thailand. It has an area of 2,700 rais (1,067 acres), covering the area of the sub-districts Pak Nam, Doem Bang and Hua Khao of Doem Bang Nang Buat District, Suphan Buri Province all the way to the sub-district of Ban Chian, Hankha District, Chai Nat Province. The lake is approximately 64 km (39.8 mi) north of Suphan Buri City.

== History ==
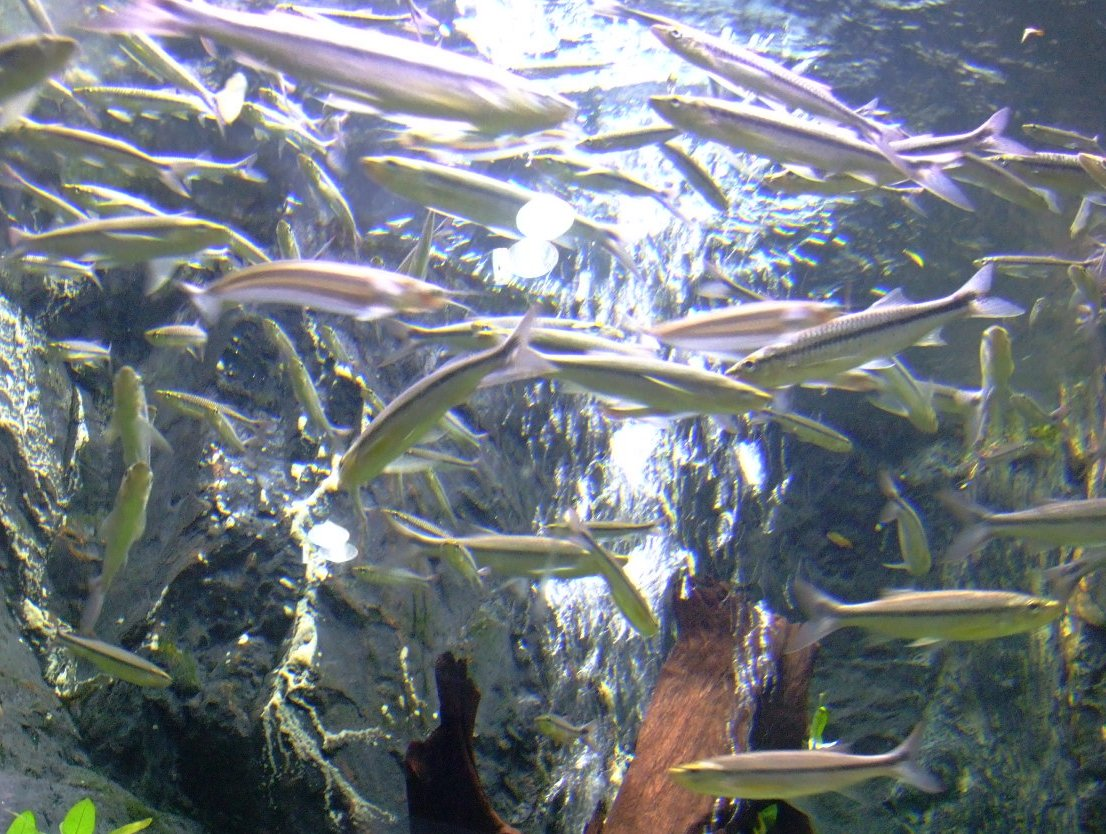
Apollo shark at Bueng Chawak Aquarium

The lake was declared a non-hunting area in 1983. In 1996, on the occasion of the 50-year reign of King Rama IX, the government developed this area as a tourist attraction in honour of the King's golden jubilee. A public aquarium, as well as a zoo and bird park, have opened.

In 1998, the government registered Bueng Chawak as an important wetland under the Ramsar Convention.

The surrounding lake is beautiful and shady. A large flock of migrating lesser whistling ducks and other waterfowl fly in during the cool season from November to March, and depart again in April. On the shores of the lake, bungalow-style accommodation is available to tourists.

== Sights ==
- Bueng Chawak Chaloem Phrakiet Aquarium – Consists of two sections, one showing freshwater fish species and the other showing marine fish species. The highlight is the longest and largest shark tunnel in Southeast Asia.
- Bueng Chawak Zoo – Houses tigers, lions, white tigers, leopards, clouded leopards, camels, axis deer, bears, rabbits, guinea pigs, Indian peafowl and various species of pheasant.
- Aviary – Occupies an area of 5 rais (1.9 acres), 25 m (82.0 ft) high, with more than 40 rare bird species, is a highlight.
- Crocodile Pond – Part of the aquarium, it is a breeding ground for two crocodile species native to Thailand, Siamese crocodiles and estuarine crocodiles. There are also products made from crocodile skin for sale as souvenirs, such as leather bags and belts, as well as local OTOP handicrafts.
- Bueng Chawak Folk Vegetable Park for Subsistence – A botanical garden on an area of 26 rais (10 acres), on an island in the middle of the lake. There are learning points for shade plants, folk vegetables and herbs to treat symptoms. It is also home to a collection of more than 500 types of folk vegetables such as snake gourds.

In addition to the entrance to the lake, there are also stalls selling dried freshwater fish caught by the villagers. Most of them are fish species from the central river basin such as Tha Chin and Chao Phraya, many of which are rare in Bangkok such as freshwater sole, river tonguefish and bagrid catfish.

== See more ==
- List of protected areas of Thailand
- List of Ramsar wetlands of Thailand
