= Bang Rachan district =

Bang Rachan บางระจัน
- District
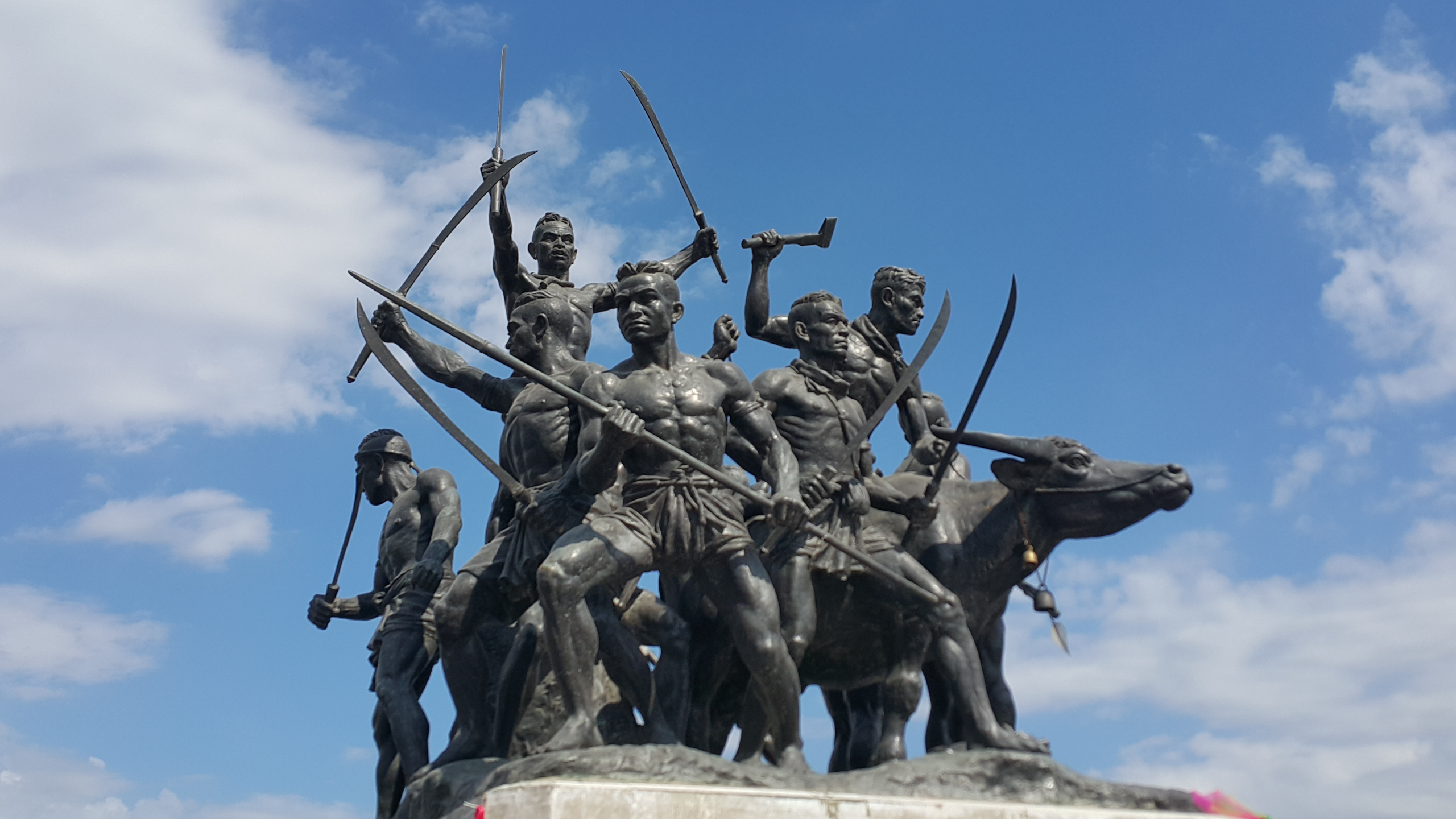
- Bang Rachan heroes monument

- District location in Sing Buri province
- Coordinates: 14°53′32″N 100°19′2″E
- Country: Thailand
- Province: Sing Buri
- Seat: Sing

Area
  - Total: 190.5 km^{2} (73.6 sq mi)

Population (2000)
  - Total: 37,936
  - Density: 199.1/km^{2} (516/sq mi)
- Time zone: UTC+7 (ICT)
- Postal code: 16130
- Geocode: 1702

Bang Rachan (Thai: บางระจัน, pronounced [bāːŋ rā.t͡ɕān]) is a district (amphoe) of Sing Buri province, central Thailand.

== Etymology ==
The word bang is a Thai word meaning 'home', 'village', or more specifically 'river village'. Rachan is a Sanskrit word which is most commonly translated as 'creation' but can have many meanings. One possible meaning is 'formation' or 'array of troops'. As Bang Rachan was the place of a historically important battle, perhaps this is the original meaning. Another possible connection is the Sanskrit word for king, "rajan", which may not be too far fetched since the king of Siam resided in Ayutthaya at the time of the Burmese–Siamese War (1765–1767) and could easily have visited or founded Bang Rachan, or it could even be the seat of a previous king. The history of the area is uncertain and conquerors have rewritten history intentionally several times, so the exact origin of the name is unknown. Rachan is even used as the name of a person, so "Bang Rachan" could simply refer to 'the village by the river where Rachan lives'.

== History ==
The area of Bang Rachan district was mostly part of the historical Mueang Sing. When the government re-established Mueang Sing, the area was divided into two districts, Bang Phutsa (now Mueang Sing Buri) and Sing. The district was renamed Bang Rachan in 1939.

The first district office was on the right bank of the Noi River in Tambon Choeng Klat. In 1898 was moved to the left bank of the river in Tambon Sing area.

Despite its name, the historic battle of Bang Rachan between the Burmese army and Thai villagers took place in the area of neighboring Khai Bang Rachan district, which was split off from Bang Rachan District in 1972.

== Geography ==
Neighboring districts are (from the north clockwise) Sankhaburi of Chai Nat province, In Buri, Mueang Sing Buri and Khai Bang Rachan of Sing Buri Province, and Doem Bang Nang Buat of Suphan Buri province.

== Administration ==
The district is divided into eight sub-districts (tambons).

1.	Sing	สิงห์
2.	Mai Dat	ไม้ดัด
3.	Choeng Klat	เชิงกลัด
4.	Pho Chon Kai	โพชนไก่
5.	Mae La	แม่ลา
6.	Ban Cha	บ้านจ่า
7.	Phak Than	พักทัน
8.	Sa Chaeng	สระแจง
