= Phrom Buri district =

Phrom Buri พรหมบุรี
- District
- District location in Sing Buri province
- Coordinates: 14°47′28″N 100°27′13″E
- Country: Thailand
- Province: Sing Buri
- Seat: Phrom Buri
- Tambon: 7
- Muban: 42

Area
  - Total: 82.5 km^{2} (31.9 sq mi)

Population (2014)
  - Total: 23,994
  - Density: 294.6/km^{2} (763/sq mi)
- Time zone: UTC+7 (ICT)
- Postal code: 16120
- Geocode: 1704

Phrom Buri (Thai: พรหมบุรี, pronounced [pʰrōm bū.rīː]) is a district (amphoe) in the eastern part of Sing Buri province, central Thailand.

== History ==
The town (mueang) of Phrom Buri dates back to before the reign of King U Thong, the first king of Ayutthaya kingdom. It is the southernmost of the four towns of the eastern of two rows of ancient settlements that Phōngsi Wanasin and Thiwa Supcanya found on ground above the 3.5-metre contour of the Chao Phraya plain, the others being Chainat, Inburi and Singburi. The old city was at Wat Amphawan, Tambon Phrom Buri. Later the center of the city was moved to Pak Bang Muen Han (ปากบางหมื่นหาญ) and to the north side of Wat Phromma Thephawat.

During the Thesaphiban reforms, Phrom Buri was one of the provinces included into Monthon Krungkao (later renamed to Monthon Ayutthaya) in 1895. It was later downgraded to a district in Sing Buri Province.

In 1943 the district office was moved to its present location on the north side of Wat Kudi Thong.

== Geography ==
Neighboring districts are (from the east clockwise) Tha Wung of Lopburi province, Chaiyo and Pho Thong of Ang Thong province, Tha Chang and Mueang Sing Buri of Sing Buri Province.

== Administration ==
=== Central administration ===
Phrom Buri is divided into seven sub-districts (tambons), which are further subdivided into 42 administrative villages (mubans).

| No. | Name | Thai | Villages | Pop. |
|---|---|---|---|---|
| 1. | Phra Ngam | พระงาม | 6 | 3,800 |
| 2. | Phrom Buri | พรหมบุรี | 6 | 3,274 |
| 3. | Bang Nam Chiao | บางน้ำเชี่ยว | 6 | 3,665 |
| 4. | Ban Mo | บ้านหม้อ | 8 | 6,145 |
| 5. | Ban Paeng | บ้านแป้ง | 6 | 2,303 |
| 6. | Hua Pa | หัวป่า | 4 | 1,479 |
| 7. | Rong Chang | โรงช้าง | 6 | 3,328 |

=== Local administration ===
There are two sub-district municipalities (thesaban tambons) in the district:

- Bang Nam Chiao (Thai: เทศบาลตำบลบางน้ำเชี่ยว) consisting of sub-district Bang Nam Chiao.
- Phrom Buri (Thai: เทศบาลตำบลพรหมบุรี) consisting of sub-district Phrom Buri.

There are four sub-district administrative organizations (SAO) in the district:

- Phra Ngam (Thai: องค์การบริหารส่วนตำบลพระงาม) consisting of sub-district Phra Ngam.
- Ban Mo (Thai: องค์การบริหารส่วนตำบลบ้านหม้อ) consisting of sub-district Ban Mo.
- Ban Paeng (Thai: องค์การบริหารส่วนตำบลบ้านแป้ง) consisting of sub-district Ban Paeng.
- Rong Chang (Thai: องค์การบริหารส่วนตำบลโรงช้าง) consisting of sub-districts Rong Chang and Hua Pa.
