= Khai Bang Rachan district =

Khai Bang Rachan ค่ายบางระจัน
- District
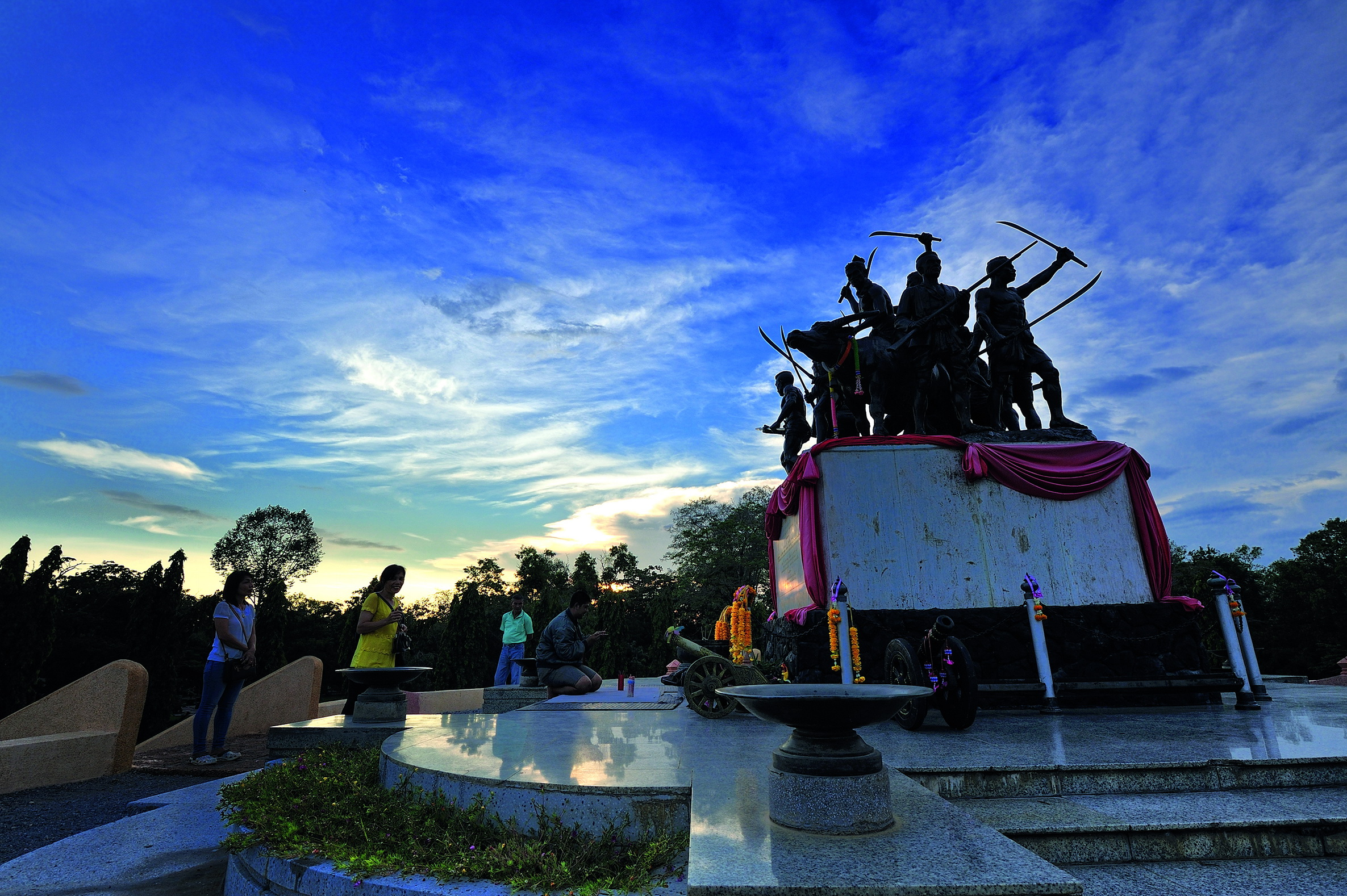
- Monument of Bang Rachan Heroes

- District location in Sing Buri province
- Coordinates: 14°48′1″N 100°18′39″E
- Country: Thailand
- Province: Sing Buri
- Seat: Bang Rachan
- Tambon: 6
- Muban: 59
- District established: 1972

Area
  - Total: 88.398 km^{2} (34.131 sq mi)

Population (2014)
  - Total: 28,316
  - Density: 319.7/km^{2} (828/sq mi)
- Time zone: UTC+7 (ICT)
- Postal code: 16150
- Geocode: 1703

Khai Bang Rachan (Thai: ค่ายบางระจัน, pronounced [kʰâːj bāːŋ rā.t͡ɕān]) is a district (amphoe) of Sing Buri province, central Thailand.

== History ==
In 1966 the government renovated Khai Bang Rachan (Camp Bang Rachan). They agreed to establish a new district to commemorate the battle at Bang Rachan. The area was thus separated from Bang Rachan district and became a minor district (king amphoe) on 1 February 1972, then consisting of five sub-districts. It was upgraded to a full district in 1976. The sixth sub-district, Nong Krathum, was created in 1980.

== Geography ==
Neighboring districts are (from the north clockwise): Bang Rachan, Mueang Sing Buri and Tha Chang of Sing Buri Province, Sawaeng Ha of Ang Thong province, and Doem Bang Nang Buat of Suphanburi province.

== Administration ==
=== Central administration ===
Khai Bang Rachan is divided into six sub-districts (tambons), which are further subdivided into 59 administrative villages (mubans).

No.	Name	Thai	Villages	Pop.
1.	Pho Thale	โพทะเล	8	4,661
2.	Bang Rachan	บางระจัน	11	7,382
3.	Pho Sangkho	โพสังโฆ	14	6,756
4.	Tha Kham	ท่าข้าม	14	4,472
5.	Kho Sai	คอทราย	6	2,526
6.	Nong Krathum	หนองกระทุ่ม	6	2,519

=== Local administration ===
There is one sub-district municipality (thesaban tambon) in the district:

- Pho Sangkho (Thai: เทศบาลตำบลโพสังโฆ) consisting of parts of sub-district Pho Sangkho.

There are six sub-district administrative organizations (SAO) in the district:

- Pho Thale (Thai: องค์การบริหารส่วนตำบลโพทะเล) consisting of sub-district Pho Thale.
- Khai Bang Rachan (Thai: องค์การบริหารส่วนตำบลค่ายบางระจัน) consisting of sub-district Bang Rachan.
- Pho Sangkho (Thai: องค์การบริหารส่วนตำบลโพสังโฆ) consisting of parts of sub-district Pho Sangkho.
- Tha Kham (Thai: องค์การบริหารส่วนตำบลท่าข้าม) consisting of sub-district Tha Kham.
- Kho Sai (Thai: องค์การบริหารส่วนตำบลคอทราย) consisting of sub-district Kho Sai.
- Nong Krathum (Thai: องค์การบริหารส่วนตำบลหนองกระทุ่ม) consisting of sub-district Nong Krathum.
