= Sirintra Niyakorn =

- ศิรินทรา นิยากร
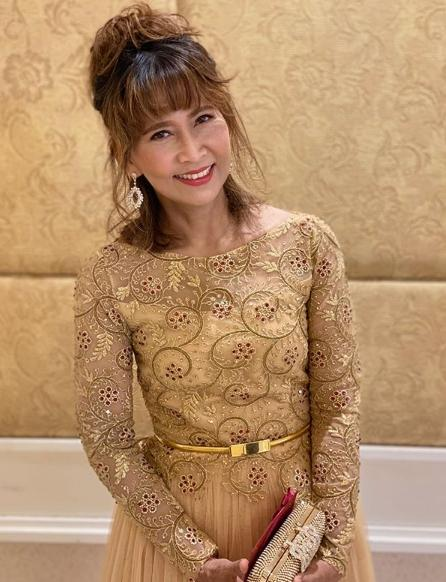
- Born: 10 March 1965 (age 61); Bangkok, Thailand
- Occupation: Singer
- Musical career
- Genre: Luk thung
- Years active: 1984–present
- Label: Azona

Sirintra Niyakorn (Thai: ศิรินทรา นิยากร b. 10 March 1965) is a famous Thai Luk thung singer.

== Early life ==
Sirintra Niyakorn was born in Bang Khen District, Bangkok. She is the daughter of Samran Niyakorn and Thongluan Niyakorn. She has a third degree from Ramkhamhaeng University.

== Career ==
Sirintra Niyakorn debuted on stage entertainers in 1981. She was a winner of a Wathinee music centre singing contest. In 1984, she was a singer under the Azona label. Her popular songs include: Rue Wa Khao Lok (Thai: รู้ว่าเขาหลอก), Ja Kor Koe Rib Kor (Thai: จะขอก็รีบขอ), Tha Paeng Roe (Thai: ทาแป้งรอ) and Yak Fang Sam (Thai: อยากฟังซ้ำ).

== Personal life ==
Since 2014, Sirintra Niyakorn has supported the People's Democratic Reform Committee.

She is an event planner for entertainers, a host of Blue Sky Channel and DJ for F.M. 95.

== Discography ==
=== Albums ===
- Rue wa Khao Lok (รู้ว่าเขาหลอก)
- Ja Kor Koe Rib Kor (จะขอก็รีบขอ)
- Tha Paeng Roe (ทาแป้งรอ)
- Yak Fang Sam (อยากฟังซ้ำ)
- Nue Kham Saban (เหนือคำสาบาน)
- Khoy Phee (คอยพี่)
