= Tha Chang district, Sing Buri =

Tha Chang ท่าช้าง
- Amphoe
- Amphoe location in Sing Buri province
- Coordinates: 14°45′42″N 100°23′24″E
- Country: Thailand
- Province: Sing Buri
- Seat: Thon Samo

Area
  - Total: 34.4 km^{2} (13.3 sq mi)

Population (2007)
  - Total: 16,257
  - Density: 472.6/km^{2} (1,224/sq mi)
- Time zone: UTC+7 (THA)
- Postal code: 16140
- Geocode: 1705

Tha Chang (Thai: ท่าช้าง, pronounced [tʰâː t͡ɕʰáːŋ]) is a district (amphoe) in the southern part of Sing Buri province, central Thailand.

== History ==
Three tambons of Phrom Buri district were separated to create the minor district (king amphoe) Tha Chang in 1960. It was upgraded to a full district in 1963.

== Geography ==
The Noi river is the main water resource of the district. It is a fertile river and has a wide river sand beach. The area was previously used to feed royal elephants.

Neighboring districts are (from the west clockwise) Khai Bang Rachan, Mueang Sing Buri and Phrom Buri of Sing Buri Province, and Chaiyo and Pho Thong of Ang Thong province.

== Administration ==
The district is subdivided into 4 subdistricts (tambon), which are further subdivided into 23 villages (muban). Thon Samo is a subdistrict municipality (thesaban tambon) which covers most of the tambon Thon Samo and Phikun Thong. There are further 2 Tambon administrative organizations (TAO).

No.	Name	Thai	Inh.
1.	Thon Samo	ถอนสมอ	6,400
2.	Pho Prachak	โพประจักษ์	3,572
3.	Wihan Khao	วิหารขาว	1,997
4.	Phikun Thong	พิกุลทอง	3,207
