= Bang Rachan =

Historical village in Thailand

Coordinates: 14°54′N 100°19′E

The village of Bang Rachan (Thai: บางระจัน, pronounced [bāːŋ rā.t͡ɕān]) was in the north of Ayutthaya, the old capital of Siam, the predecessor state of modern Thailand. Today their village is located in Khai Bang Rachan District of Sing Buri Province. The village is remembered in Thai popular history for its resistance against the Burmese invaders in the Burmese–Siamese War (1765–1767) that ended the Ayutthaya Kingdom.

According to Thai tradition, the Burmese northern invasion army led by General Ne Myo Thihapate was held up for five months at Bang Rachan. The popular narrative cannot all be true as the entire northern campaign took just over five months (mid-August 1765 to late-January 1766), and the northern Burmese army was still stuck in Phitsanulok, in north-central Siam, as late as December 1765. Burmese sources mention "petty chiefs" (cf. "mueang") stalling the northern Burmese army's advance, but it was early in the campaign along the Wang River in northern Siam (not near Ayutthaya) during the rainy season (August–October 1765). The Burmese general who was then present near Ayutthaya was not Thihapate, but rather Maha Nawrahta, whose southern army was waiting for the northern Burmese army to show up to attack Ayutthaya. It appears that the three verified events, petty chiefs resisting Thihapate in the north, Thihapate's campaign period of five months, and Maha Nawrahta dawdling near Ayutthaya—have merged to create this Siamese mythology.

The Thai narrative is now an ingrained part of Thai popular culture. The 2000 Thai film Bang Rajan dramatizes the Thai version of events.

One of the more iconic images is that of Nai Thong Min, who becomes drunk and furiously rides a gigantic water buffalo into battle against the Burmese. The public memory of the battle has been likened to that of the Battle of the Alamo in the minds of Americans.

== Historical revisionism ==
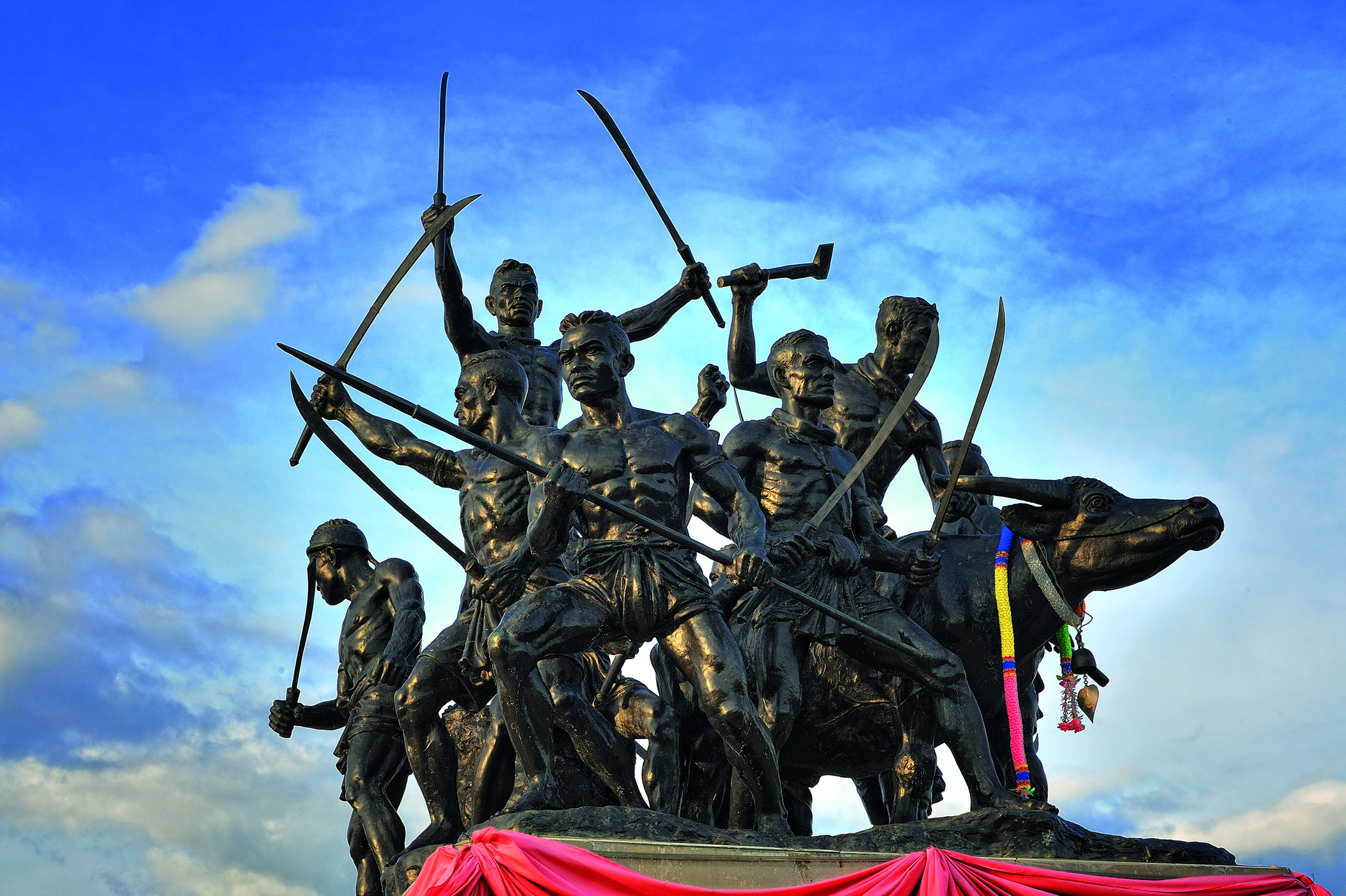
Monument honouring the eleven leaders of Khai Bang Rachan

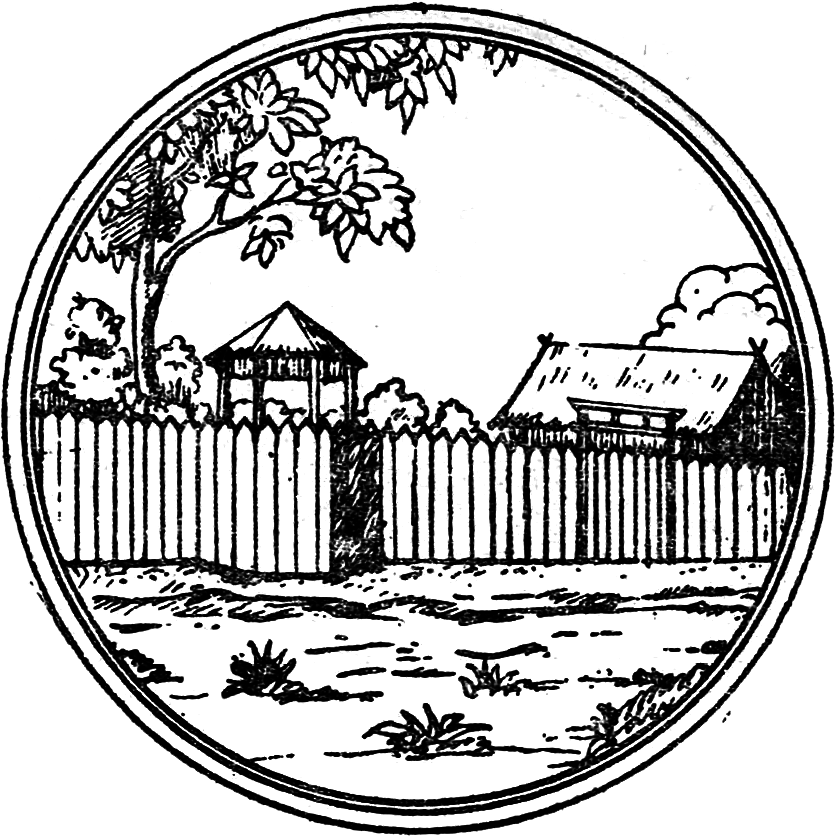
Original seal of Sing Buri province, designed by Thai Fine Arts Department in 1940, depicted an image of the camp of Bang Rachan.

In 1765, Burmese armies of the Konbaung kingdom entered Siam. Burmese accounts describe the invasion as having a deliberate and predetermined ambition, credited to King Mang Ra (Hsinbyushin). Other sources and analysts of the period, most notably Damrong Rajanubhab, the father of Thai history, consider this to be historical revisionism and believe that the Burmese did not initially invade with the intention of permanent conquest nor with any successful campaign on Ayutthaya itself.

The Burmese forces encountered little resistance from the Siamese people and had advanced close to Ayutthaya, but hesitated to attack due to their uncertainty regarding the strength of the enemy forces they would have to face. There was much raiding of the surrounding countryside as well as a policy the Burmese had implemented where they had taken all the rice paddies from the villages to feed their armies and demanded all the women from the villages they raided, thus eventually a policy which provoked the Siamese people into resistance.

The beginning of the resistance and the first notable accounts of Bang Rachan occurred when a group of Siamese Warriors from various villages—notably Sibuathong, Pho Krap and Pho Thale—led by Nai Jan nuad keao, Nai Chote, Nai In, Nai Muang, Nai Thong Maen, Nai Taen and Nai Dok Gaew, who regularly lured a group of Burmese soldiers into the forest with the promise of rescuing women who were held captive and then eventually turning upon them, killing most of the Burmese soldiers along the way. After their tactics and strategies were eventually predicted by the remaining Burmese soldiers at their camps, they retreated to Bang Rachan, where most of the population of the villages of Mueang Wiset Chaichan, Mueang Sing and Mueang San had fled.

Bang Rachan is described as being ideally a defensible village. A place where foodstuffs were plentiful, a village on high ground and difficult for the enemies to raid. In addition to its ideal position and its swelling numbers of warriors, Bang Rachan had at this point approximately 400 warriors. They had eleven leaders (Nai Thong Maen, Pun Reuang, Nai Thong Saeng Yai, Nai Jan Nuad Keao, Nai Taen, Nai Chote, Nai In, Nai Muang, Nai Thong Kao, Nai Dok Gaew and Khun Sarn) and had worked together on making fortifications for the village. A Buddhist monk called Thammachote had also been invited into the village monastery where he was held in great respect by the villagers. The villagers believed him to have great powers and knowledge of spells, charms, and incantations.

The Burmese leaders camped at Mueang Wiset Chaichan, which they had set up their main camp, were aware of the slaughter of their men by Bang Rachan and had earlier sent a small force of about 100 men to capture them which they were unsuccessful. During the raid, the Burmese were taken by surprise when they were attacked while resting and were almost entirely wiped out by the force led by Nai Ten, who had been elected the main leader.

News of their victory spread quickly across the country and resulted in more people coming out of hiding to join the resistance movement, swelling the number of reinforcements for Bang Rachan to 1,000 warriors. The warriors were organised along the lines of professional military ranks but were disadvantaged by their lack of weapons they had for their battles against the Burmese soldiers. The Burmese leaders, being aware that their forces were facing heavy resistance from Bang Rachan, had requested reinforcements before sending another force to raid against the village but again, the leaders underestimated the warriors capability, as a second 500-strong Burmese force was routed the second time. This time, a third force again, greater in numbers and under a new commander, was also similarly defeated.

Eventually, during the fourth battle, a pivotal event occurred throughout the battle by a force of 1,000 Burmese soldiers under one of the leaders of the main camp, Surin Chokhong. This time, this force was not immediately defeated by Bang Rachan, but had successfully killed their commander Surin Chokhong and after much fighting, Bang Rachan surprisingly retreated. While retreating and for the Burmese, knowing that they had a chance to seize the advantage of them retreating, instead lowered their guards to begin preparing food, treating the injured and caring for the corpse of their fallen commander. Seeing this unfold for Bang Rachan's advantage, the warriors quickly ambushed the resting Burmese soldiers who were surprised by the unexpected attack and were eventually defeated with most of the soldiers barely escaping. While victorious again for Bang Rachan, the leader Nai Taen, was shot in the knee during the ambush, an event which had grave consequences for the village.

The aftermath of this fourth battle saw both sides receive reinforcements, with Bang Rachan consisting of 11 leaders, selected a new leader out of the 11 to replace Nai Ten, who was ultimately Nai Chan Nuad Keao, who was famed for his ferocity in battles and "bristling moustache". The fortunes for Bang Rachan remained positive under Nai Chan Nuad Keao, whose selection as the new leader, increased the number of warriors and achieve even greater levels of organisation for their forces. Bang Rachan's reputation around the country grew to such an extent that the Burmese soldiers came to fear them even more after the numerous unsuccessful raids and the Burmese leaders having trouble recruiting soldiers to attack the village.

Eventually, after seven battles and seven defeats for the Burmese forces, an eighth force, under a Mon commander who had lived in Siam in order to follow their ways and learn about them whilst a spy, volunteered to take an army and to finally ensure the defeat of Bang Rachan once and for all. What set this commander apart from all the previous commanders who had fallen was his knowledge of the country and its weaknesses. He did not underestimate Bang Rachan unlike the other commanders but instead, he adjusted his tactics and strategies to disadvantage them. He had inched slowly towards the village, building a series of forts along the route and when faced to fight the village, he refused to fight except from within the fortress walls that had been built to disadvantage and weaken them.

A lack of artillery was now taking its toll and crippling for Bang Rachan, as they had trouble taking down their forts. Along the way, they had heavy losses of its warriors and its people inside the village due to continuous firing of cannons towards their village. At one stage, one of the leaders, Nai Thong Min, who was drunk at that time, was furious to see cannons being fired towards them, mounted a water buffalo and tried to attack the Burmese forts with a small force in what remains one of the most iconic folktales and legends of Bang Rachan. He was eventually killed with the small force facing the same fate after unsuccessfully taking down the forts. This was the first defeat for Bang Rachan by the Burmese army.

With the villagers morale down after losing one of their leaders Nai Thong Min and all the havoc caused within the village, Bang Rachan pleaded for help to Ayutthaya. They asked for cannons they could deploy against the Burmese forts but as expected and typical of their actions throughout the war, Ayutthaya showed little interest in helping them as they were trying to keep enough artillery as they could to prepare for their own war with the Burmese. They had refused their request but one man, Phraya Rattanathibet, was instead sent to help Bang Rachan forge their own weapons and cannons. The weapons they had cast and the cannons they had forged were eventually cracked and were little use for the last remaining battles. Soon after this, Nai Ten had succumb to the wound on his knee and the other leaders, Nai Chan Nuad Keao and Nai Khun Sun had died from their wounds from their unsuccessful raid on the Burmese forts.

Four of the eleven leaders had died, and now with the villagers dispirited and losing hope of winning the war let alone surviving the havoc caused in their country, the village of Bang Rachan had eventually fell to the last battle against the Burmese army, being put to the ground while facing continuous siege of cannons towards them and the village. Five months since the first resistance movement and their earlier battles against the Burmese army are notably the only successful resistance group that had put up with the Burmese armies and fought to the very end throughout the invasion of Siam. Ayutthaya itself was not as successful in their own campaign in protecting their kingdom and eventually as well falling to the Burmese hands.

The village of Bang Rachan will always been remembered by the people of Thailand for their bravery, heroism and devotion in fighting and protecting their motherland that was once fought and protected by their ancestors in order for their kids and future generations to have a place to live and call home. Their stories, their names and their sacrifices will always be the most respected by the Thais and that their love for the country will always reflect on the village of Bang Rachan.

The battle monument is 13 kilometres southwest of the town on Highway 3032 in Khai Bang Rachan District.

== Bang Rachan in film ==
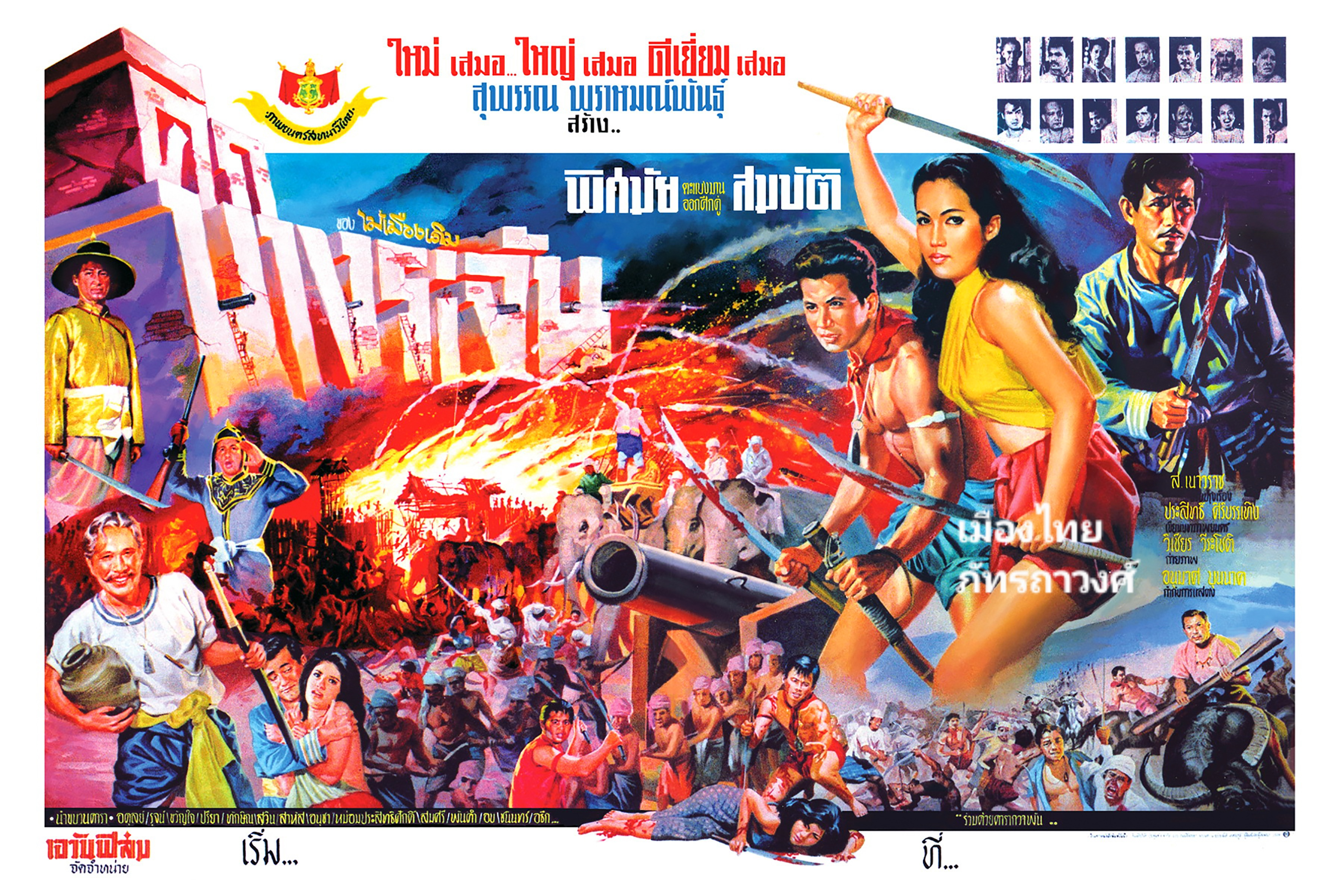
Theatrical release poster of the 1966 film

Two Thai films about Bang Rachan have been made. One was in 1966 and it starred Sombat Metanee. Better known is the 2000 film by director Thanit Jitnukul and starring Bin Banluerit, Winai Kraibutr. Oliver Stone adopted the film and "presented" screenings of it in the United States in 2004.

== See also ==
- Ayutthaya Kingdom
- Siam
- History of Thailand
- History of Burma
