= Sing Buri province =

Province of Thailand

Coordinates: 14°53′35″N 100°24′42″E

Sing Buri สิงห์บุรี
- Province
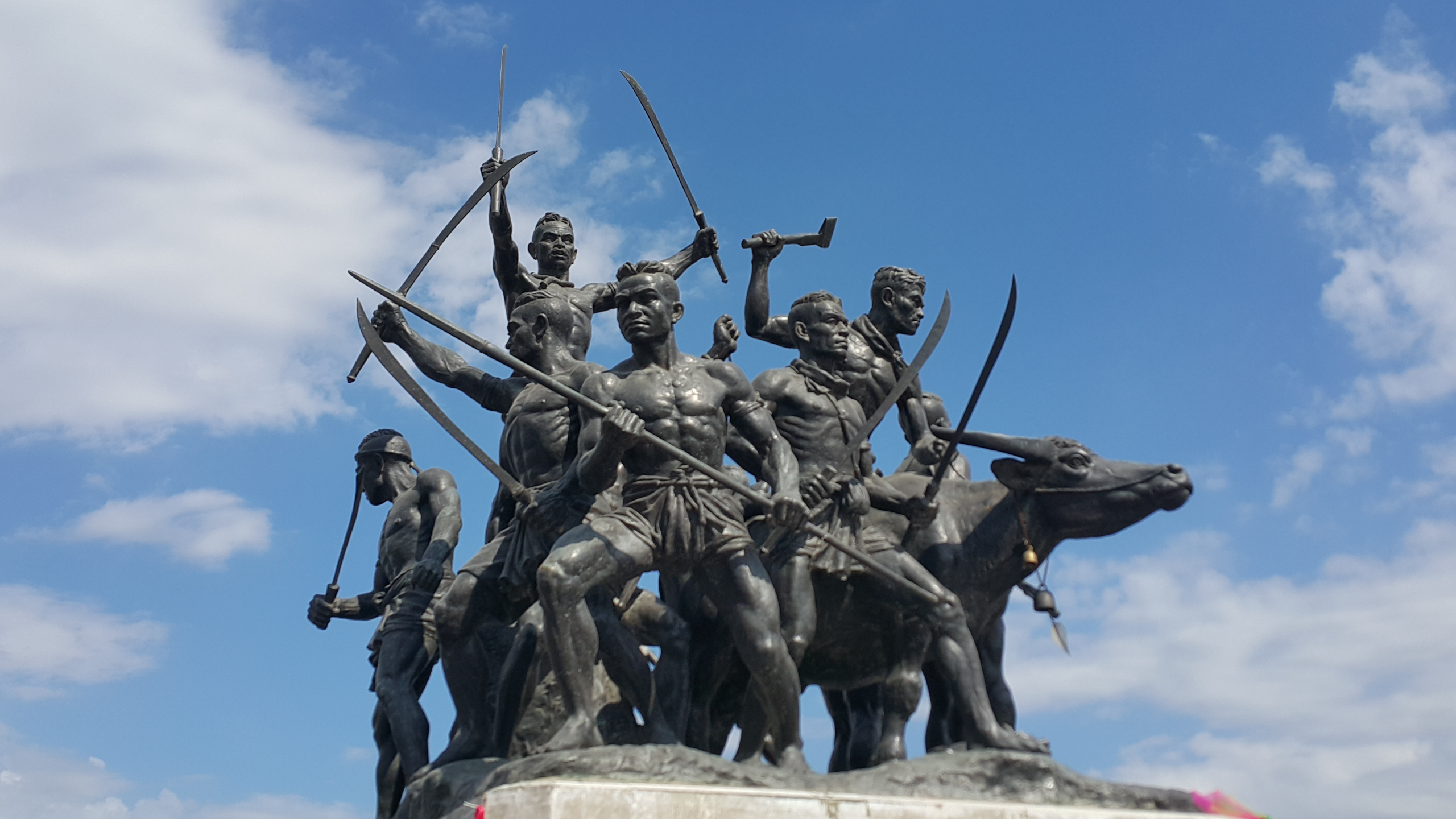
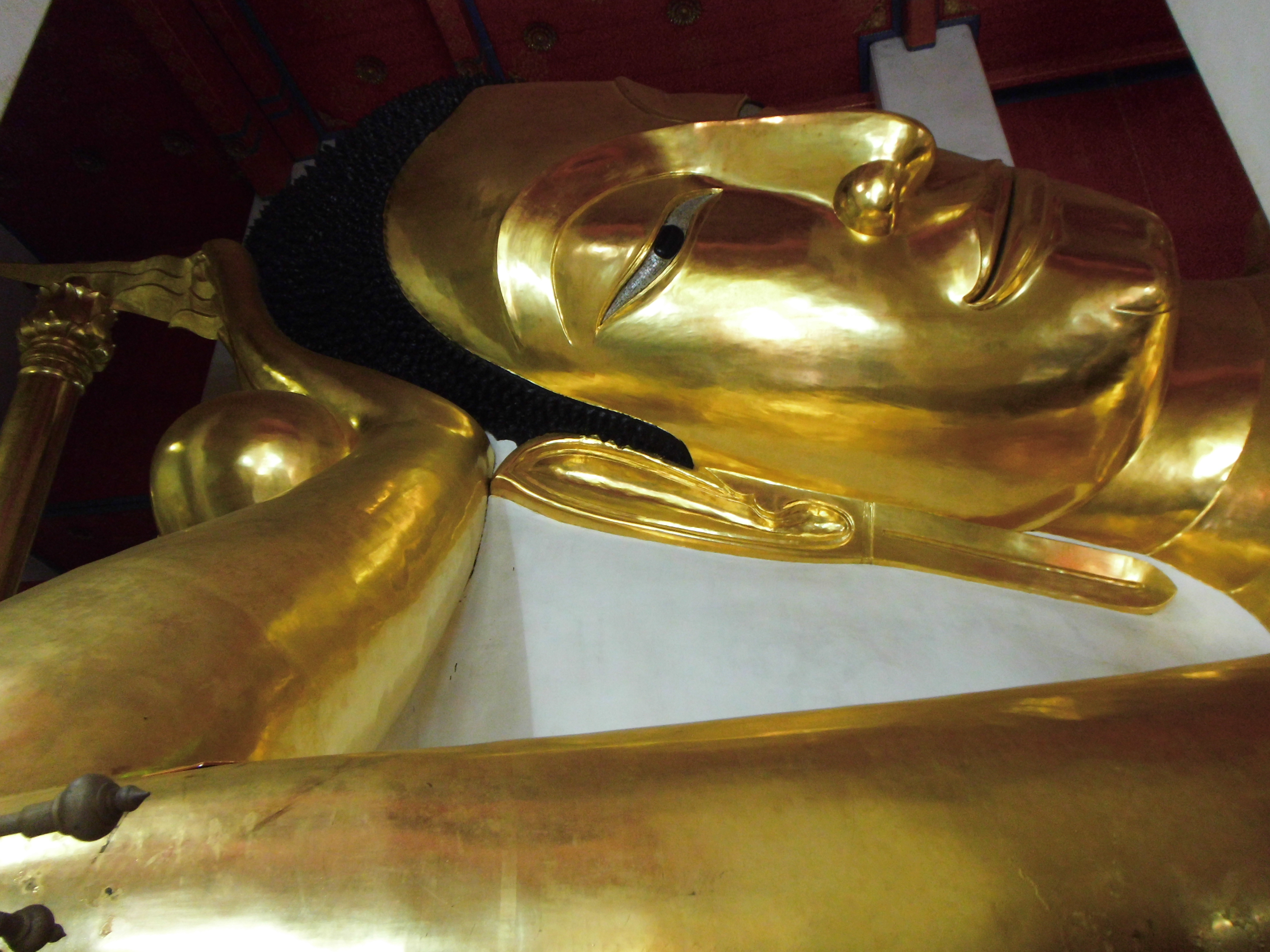
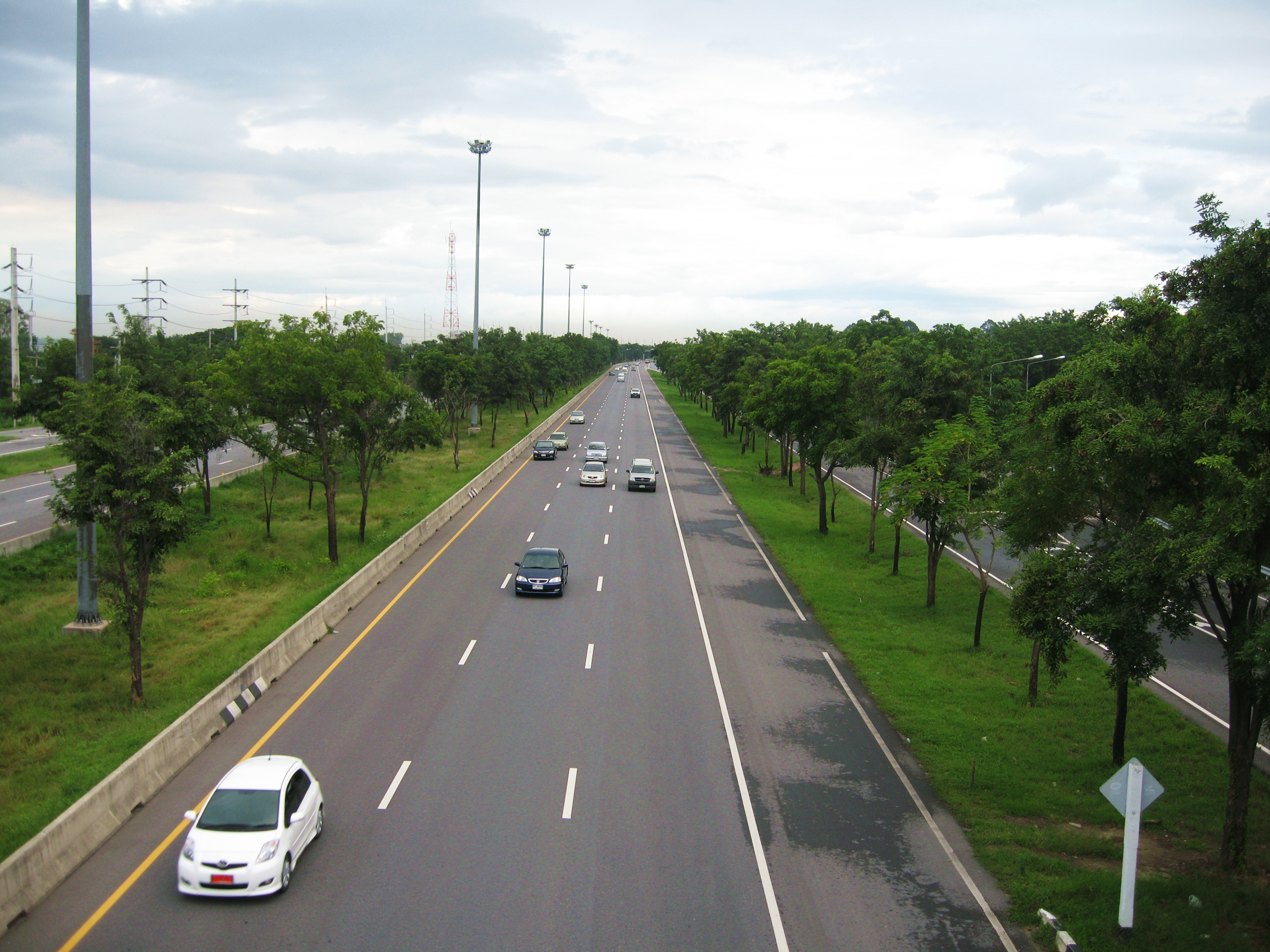
- From top: Monument of eleven leaders of Khai Bangrachan, Large reclining Buddha image of Wat Phra Non Chak Si, AH1 and Highway 32 in In Buri north of the province

- Flag Seal
- Nickname: Mueang Sing (Thai: เมืองสิงห์) (lion town)
- Mottoes: ถิ่นวีรชนคนกล้า คู่หล้าพระนอน นามกระฉ่อนช่อนแม่ลา เทศกาลกินปลาประจำปี ("Land of heroes and brave people. The reclining Buddha image. Famous Mae La catfish. Annual fish festival.")
- Map of Thailand highlighting Sing Buri province
- Country: Thailand
- Capital: Sing Buri town

Government
  - Governor: Sumet Theeraniti

Area
  - Total: 817 km^{2} (315 sq mi)
  - Rank: 74th

Population (2024)
  - Total: ▲199,803
  - Rank: 75th
  - Density: 245/km^{2} (630/sq mi)
  - Rank: 13th

Human Achievement Index
  - HAI (2022): 0.6666 "high" Ranked 9th

GDP
  - Total: baht 27 billion (US$0.9 billion) (2019)
- Time zone: UTC+7 (ICT)
- Postal code: 16xxx
- Calling code: 036
- ISO 3166 code: TH-17
- Website: singburi.go.th

Sing Buri Provincial Administrative Organization องค์การบริหารส่วนจังหวัดสิงห์บุรี
- Provincial Administrative Organization
- Interactive map of Sing Buri Provincial Administrative Organization

Government
  - Type: Local administrative divisions
  - Body: Sing Buri Provincial Administrative Organization
  - President: Supawat Thianthaworn
- Website: singburipao.go.th

Sing Buri (Thai: สิงห์บุรี, pronounced [sǐŋ būrīː]) is one of the central provinces (changwat) of Thailand. Neighboring provinces are (from north clockwise) Nakhon Sawan, Lopburi, Ang Thong, Suphan Buri, and Chai Nat. The province lies on the Chao Phraya plain and holds several Dvaravati-period towns. It is associated with the defence of Bang Rachan against the Burmese in 1765, commemorated on the provincial seal.

== Toponymy ==
The word sing originates from Sanskrit singh meaning 'lion' and buri, from Sanskrit puri meaning buri mueang 'fortified city' or 'town'. Hence the literal translation is 'lion city', sharing the same root as Singapore.

== Geography ==
Sing Buri is located on the flat river plain of the Chao Phraya River valley. Eighty percent of the areas are wide flat areas, of which the soil is suitable for agriculture. There are a small number of slopes in swamps of different sizes. The highest average height of the area is 17 metres above sea level. Floods will occur during the rainy season. The total forest area is 0.4 km^{2} (0.15 sq mi) or 0.5 per mille of provincial area.

== Climate ==
Sing Buri province has a tropical savanna climate (Köppen climate classification category Aw). Winters are dry and warm. Temperatures rise until May. The monsoon season runs from May through October, with heavy rain and somewhat cooler temperatures during the day, although nights remain warm. Climate statistics: the maximum temperature is 41.4 °C (106.5 °F) in April and the lowest temperature is 10.2 °C (50.4 °F) in December. The highest average temperature is 36.8 °C (98.2 °F) and the minimum average temperature is 20.6 °C (69.1 °F). Annual average rainfall is 1,125 millimetres with mean rainy days is 17.6 in September. Maximum daily rainfall is 203.4 millimetres in October.

== History ==
The area of Sing Buri held an important position in early Thai history from the Dvaravati period down to the Ayutthaya period. A survey by Phōngsi Wanasin and Thiwa Supcanya found the ancient settlements of the plain arranged in two rows above the 3.5-metre contour, the eastern running from Chainat through Inburi, Singburi and Phromburi to Lopburi. Three of the four towns of that row, Inburi, Singburi and Phromburi, are in the present province. Inscribed silver medallions reading śrī-dvāravatī-īśvara-puṇya are recorded from this province, and from Nakhon Pathom, Ratchaburi, Suphan Buri, Lop Buri and Chai Nat. Most are chance finds of unknown provenance, many are in private collections, and forgeries have lately been noticed.

Ban Khu Mueang, in Huai Chan subdistrict of In Buri, is one of ten Dvaravati sites of the central plain whose glass beads Saritpong Khunsong reports on a compositional analysis. Beads of a Middle Eastern plant-ash soda-lime composition were identified among them.

According to the Ayutthaya Testimonies, the provincial centre, Sing Buri, was founded by the Siamese monarch Anuraja in the early 12th century. He established it as the new capital of the Phraek Si Racha region, superseding Chai Nat as the administrative centre of the polity.

The city was originally on the banks of the Chaksi River. The first relocation was to the west of the Noi River (south of Sing Sutthara Temple) and later moved to Pak Bang Krathong, Ton Pho subdistrict. In 1869 the districts In Buri, Phrom Buri and Sing Buri were merged. In 1895 the three districts came under control of Krung Kao province ("Old capital"), monthon Krung Kao. In 1896 the city was moved to its final destination in Bang Phutsa subdistrict. In 1917 Mueang district changed its name to Bang Phutsa district. In 1938 the government changed the name of the capital district to be the same as the name of the province. So Bang Phutsa district uses the name Mueang Sing Buri until today. In 1939 Sing district was renamed Bang Rachan district.

== Symbols ==
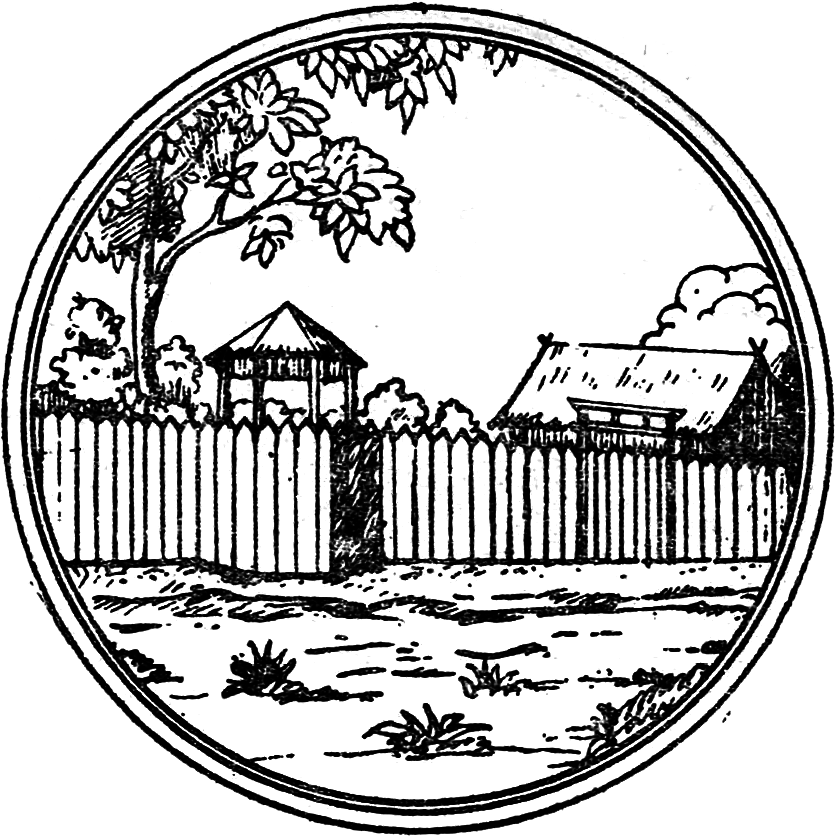
Old seal

The provincial seal presents the history of Khai Bang Rachan. When the Burmese attacked Ayutthaya in 1765, 11 leaders with villagers from Bang Rachan fought the army when it stopped north of Ayutthaya. They managed to delay them for five months before they were finally defeated, soon thereafter Ayutthaya fell as well. Annually on 4 February a ceremony is held in remembrance of these local heroes. This story was also made into a movie in Thailand.

- Old seal was created in 1940, shows the fort Khai Bang Rachan.
- New seal was adopted in 2004, shows the eleven leaders who fought the Burmese.

The provincial tree is the Red Sandalwood Tree (Adenanthera pavonina). Pla chon mae la (Mae la snakehead fish) is the native snakehead fish variety that originated in the Lam Mae La, an 18 km (11.2 mi) long branch of the Chao Phraya River that flows through the three districts of Sing Buri. This type of snakehead is an ingredient that can be used in a variety of dishes, both savory and sweet. It is the provincial good stuff and souvenir. Therefore, the aquatic life of Sing Buri is the snakehead fish (Channa strita).

== Demographics ==
=== Population ===
Population history of Sing Buri province is as follows:

1947	1960	1970	1980	1990	2000	2010	2020
116,227	154,000	162,000	202,605	230,913	232,766	199,982	205,898

=== Religion ===
The province has 193 Theravada Buddhist temples, of which 177 are Maha Nikai and 16 Dhammayut.

55	In Buri	40	Mueang Sing Buri	35	Bang Rachan
30	Phrom Buri	25	Khai Bang Rachan	8	Tha Chang

== Administrative divisions ==
Map of Sing Buri with six districts

=== Provincial government ===
The province is divided into six districts (amphoes). The districts are further subdivided into 45 subdistricts (tambons) and 364 villages (mubans).

1. Mueang Sing Buri
2. Bang Rachan
3. Khai Bang Rachan
4. Phrom Buri
5. Tha Chang
6. In Buri

=== Local government ===
As of 26 November 2019 there are: one Sing Buri Provincial Administration Organisation (ongkan borihan suan changwat) and 8 municipal (thesaban) areas in the province. Sing Buri and Bang Rachan have town (thesaban mueang) status. Further 6 subdistrict municipalities (thesaban tambon). The non-municipal areas are administered by 33 Subdistrict Administrative Organisations - SAO (ongkan borihan suan tambon).

== Education ==
Educational institutions from kindergarten to vocational education in Sing Buri province is as follows:

=== Vocational education ===
- Total six vocational colleges with 4,070 students.

=== Secondary education ===
- Total 18 upper secondary schools with 3,423 students.
- Total 42 lower secondary schools with 6,444 students.

=== Primary education ===
- Total 61 primary schools with 11,751 pupils.

== Health ==
=== Government hospitals ===
There are six government hospitals in Sing Buri province, of which Mueang Sing Buri and In Buri districts each with its own general hospital:

- Sing Buri Hospital with 282 beds.
- In Buri Hospital with 150 beds.

Further there are four community hospitals:

Tha Chang Hospital	42 beds
Bang Rachan Hospital	35 beds
Khai Bang Rachan	30 beds
Phrom Buri Hospital	28 beds

=== Private hospital ===
There is one private hospital in Sing Buri province, in Mueang Sing Buri district:

- Singburi Vechakarn Hospital with 30 beds.

=== Health promoting hospitals ===
The province has 45 health-promoting hospitals, of which In Buri has 17, Bang Rachan 7, Mueang Sing Buri 7, Phrom Buri 6, Khai Bang Rachan 5 and Tha Chang 3.

=== Clinics ===
Around 105 clinics are in Sing Buri province, of which 58 clinics (55%) in Mueang Sing Buri, 16 Bang Rachan, 12 Khai Bang Rachan, 11 Phrom Buri, 5 Tha Chang and 3 In Buri.

== Economy ==
=== Economic output ===
In 2022, Sing Buri province had an economic output of 27.932 billion baht (US$798 million). This amounts to per capita gross provincial product (GPP) of 151,441 baht (US$4,326). In 2024 the total workforce was 109,981 of which 108,274 persons were employed in economic activity. In agriculture and fishery 24,115 persons (22.3%) were employed and in the non-agricultural sector 84,159 persons (77.7%).

Gross Provincial Product (GPP)
	Activities	Baht	Percent
1	Manufacturing	8,287,000,000	29.7
2	Education	4,001,000,000	14.3
3	Trade	3,307,000,000	11.8
4	Agriculture	3,171,000,000	11.3
5	Finance	1,604,000,000	5.7
6	Human health	1,319,000,000	4.7
7	Defence / publ.admin.	1,068,000,000	3.8
8	Construction	970,000,000	3.5
9	Transportation	887,000,000	3.2
10	Real estate	829,000,000	3.0
11	Other service activity	818,000,000	2.9
12	Energy	692,000,000	2.5
13	Information	269,000,000	1.0
14	Pastime	210,000,000	0.8
15	Water supply	191,000,000	0.7
16	Accommodation / food	157,000,000	0.6
17	Mining	120,000,000	0.4
18	Administration	29,000,000	0.1
19	Scientific activity	6,000,000	-
	Total	27,932,000,000	100

Employed persons
	Activities	Workforce	Percent
1	Agriculture and fishery	24,115	22.3
2	Manufacturing	23,286	21.5
3	Trade	18,662	17.2
4	Defence and publ.admin.	9,519	8.8
5	Accommodation and food	7,349	6.8
6	Human health	4,568	4.2
7	Education	4,276	3.9
8	Construction	4,175	3.9
9	Transportation	3,435	3.2
10	Other service activity	2,907	2.7
11	Finance	1,640	1.5
12	Household enterprise	949	0.9
13	Scientific activity	727	0.7
14	Pastime	693	0.6
15	Water supply	454	0.4
16	Real estate	443	0.4
17	Administration	427	0.4
18	Information	348	0.3
19	Energy	301	0.3
	Total	108,274	100

=== Manufacturing ===
The biggest sector of the economy generated 8.297 billion baht (US$236 million) or 29.7% of GPP with 2,144 registered entities and a workforce of 23,286 people (21.5% of all employed persons).

=== Trade ===
Wholesale and retail trade; repair of motor vehicles and motorcycles, the third sector of the economy generated 3.307 billion baht (US$94 million) or 11.8% of GPP with 3,685 registered entities and a workforce of 18,662 (17.2%).

=== Agriculture ===
Agriculture and fishery in Sing Buri province, the fourth sector of the economy, generated 3.171 billion baht (US$91 million) or 11.3% of GPP.

Agricultural land use, 637 km^{2} (246 sq mi) is 77.5% of total land of Sing Buri province 822 km^{2} (317 sq mi). This is divided as follows: paddy land: 540 km^{2} (210 sq mi) 65.7%, upland rice: 35 km^{2} (14 sq mi) 4.3%, farmland: 44 km^{2} (17 sq mi) 5.4%, orchard/perennial crop: 11 km^{2} (4.2 sq mi) 1.3% and vegetable/ornamental plant: 2 km^{2} (0.77 sq mi) 0.2%.

Production of the four main arable crops: rice 361,479 tonnes, sugarcane 352,788 tonnes, peanut 539 tonnes and cassava 129 tonnes.

Production of the three main vegetable crops: watermelon 150 tonnes, cucumber 61 tonnes and chinese kale 34 tonnes.
Other fruit crops are banana 596 tonnes, mango 554 tonnes, lime 196 tonnes, pomelo 196 tonnes and guava 117 tonnes.

=== Animal husbandry ===
Livestock produced included: chickens 1,613,851, ducks 113,463, geese 45,253, swines 22,627, goats 17,354, beef cattle 2,914 and buffalos 385.

=== Fisheries ===
Total catch from 2,120 freshwater aquaculture farms amounted to 2,639 tonnes.

=== Construction ===
304 construction entities and a workforce of 4,175 people (3.9%) contributed 970 million baht (US$28 million) or 3.5% of GPP.

=== Accommodation and food service activities ===
1,483 registered hotels, restaurants and food service activities contributed 157 million baht (US$4.5 million) or 0.6 percent of GPP, with a workforce numbering 7,349 (6.8%).

== Tourism ==
There were 851 hotel rooms in the province in 2022. About 650,137 people visited that year, of whom 646,177 were Thai, and they contributed 883 million baht (US$25 million) in tourism revenue. Of the visitors, 201,973 were tourists and 448,164 excursionists. The impact of the Covid-19 pandemic on tourism is clear. In 2021, the decline was 70% compared to 2020. But in 2022 the rebound was 350% compared to 2021.

== Human achievement index 2022 ==
Health	Education	Employment	Income
48	8	22	46
Housing	Family	Transport	Participation
51	55	13	11
Province Sing Buri, with an HAI 2022 value of 0.6666 is "high", occupies place 9 in the ranking.

Since 2003, United Nations Development Programme (UNDP) in Thailand has tracked progress on human development at sub-national level using the Human achievement index (HAI), a composite index covering all the eight key areas of human development. National Economic and Social Development Board (NESDB) has taken over this task since 2017.

Rank	Classification
1 - 13	"high"
14 - 29	"somewhat high"
30 - 45	"average"
46 - 61	"somewhat low"
62 - 77	"low"

Map with provinces and HAI 2022 rankings

== Notable people ==
=== Born in Sing Buri ===
- MR Kukrit Pramoj (1911–1995), politician, author, newspaper editor, scholar, performer
- Chai Mueangsing (born 1939), luk tung singer
- Chamoy Thipyaso (born 1940), financial crime
- Thanis Sriklindee (born 1951), musician
- Nirun Boonyarattaphan (born 1955), voice actor, TV host
- Santisuk Promsiri (born 1963), actor, TV host
- Kraison Panjaroen (born 1986), footballer
- Phupoom Pongpanu (born 1991), actor
- Aniporn Chalermburanawong (born 1994), beauty pageant, actress
- Milin Dokthian (born 1996), teen idol, singer
